= List of Ramsar Sites =

List of wetlands protected under the Ramsar Convention

Ramsar sites are Wetlands of International Importance protected under the Ramsar Convention. The Convention is an international treaty for the conservation and sustainable use of wetlands, recognizing the fundamental ecological functions of wetlands and their economic, cultural, scientific, and recreational value. The convention establishes that "wetlands should be selected for the list on account of their international significance in terms of ecology, botany, zoology, limnology or hydrology." Over the years, the Conference of the Contracting Parties has adopted more specific criteria interpreting the convention text.

The Ramsar List organizes the Ramsar sites according to the contracting party that designated each to the list. Contracting parties are grouped into six "regions": Africa, Asia, Europe, Latin America and the Caribbean, North America, and Oceania. As of March 2026, 172 states have designated 2,526 sites to the list, covering 253,150,727 hectares (625,549,070 acres). The complete list of the wetlands is accessible on the Ramsar Sites Information Service website.

== Africa ==
=== Algeria ===
Name	Area (ha)	Area (acre)
Aulnaie de Aïn Khiar	180	440
Chott Aïn El Beïda	6,853	16,930
Chott de Zehrez Chergui	50,985	125,990
Chott de Zehrez Gharbi	52,200	129,000
Chott Ech Chergui	855,500	2,114,000
Chott El Beïdha-Hammam Essoukhna	12,223	30,200
Chott El Hodna	362,000	890,000
Chott Melghir	551,500	1,363,000
Chott Merrouane et Oued Khrouf	337,700	834,000
Chott Oum El Raneb	7,155	17,680
Chott Sidi Slimane	616	1,520
Chott Tinsilt	2,154	5,320
Complexe de zones humides de la plaine de Guerbes-Sanhadja	42,100	104,000
Dayet El Ferd	3,323	8,210
Garaet Annk Djemel et El Merhsel	18,140	44,800
Garaet El Taref	33,460	82,700
Garaet Guellif	24,000	59,000
Garaet Timerganine	1,460	3,600
Grotte karstique de Ghar Boumâaza	20,000	49,000
Gueltates Afilal	20,900	52,000
Ile de Rachgoun	66	160
La Réserve Naturelle du Lac des Oiseaux	120	300
La Vallée d'Iherir	6,500	16,000
Lac de Fetzara	20,680	51,100
Lac de Télamine	2,399	5,930
Lac du barrage de Boughezoul	9,058	22,380
Le Cirque de Aïn Ouarka	2,350	5,800
Les Gueltates d'Issakarassene	35,100	87,000
Les Salines d'Arzew	5,778	14,280
Marais de Bourdim	11	27
Marais de la Macta	44,500	110,000
Marais de la Mekhada	8,900	22,000
Oasis de Moghrar et de Tiout	195,500	483,000
Oasis de Ouled Saïd	25,400	63,000
Oasis de Tamantit et Sid Ahmed Timmi	95,700	236,000
Oglat Ed Daïra	23,430	57,900
Oum Lâagareb	729	1,800
Réserve Intégrale du Lac El Mellah	2,257	5,580
Réserve Intégrale du Lac Oubeïra	3,160	7,800
Réserve Intégrale du Lac Tonga	2,700	6,700
Réserve Naturelle du Lac de Béni-Bélaïd	600	1,500
Réserve Naturelle du Lac de Réghaïa	842	2,080
Sebkha d'Oran	56,870	140,500
Sebkhet Bazer	4,379	10,820
Sebkhet El Hamiet	2,509	6,200
Sebkhet El Melah	18,947	46,820
Site classé Sebkhet Ezzmoul	6,765	16,720
Site Ramsar du Lac Boulhilet	856	2,120
Tourbière du Lac Noir	5	12
Vallée de l'oued Soummam	12,453	30,770

=== Angola ===
Name	Area (ha)	Area (acre)
Lisima Lya Mwono	5,367,000	13,260,000

=== Benin ===
Name	Area (ha)	Area (acre)
Basse Vallée de l'Ouémé, Porto-Novo Lagoon, Lake Nokoué	652,760	1,613,000
Basse Vallée du Couffo, Lagune Côtiere, Chenal Aho, Lac Ahémé	524,289	1,295,550
Site Ramsar du Complexe W	895,480	2,212,800
Zone Humide de la Rivière Pendjari	144,774	357,740

=== Botswana ===
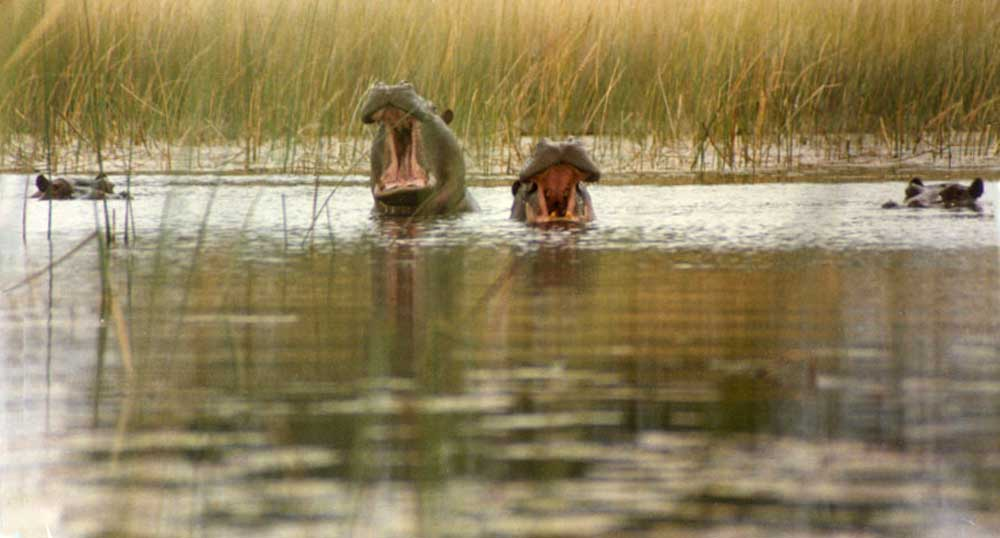
Hippos in the Okavango Delta, Botswana

Name	Area (ha)	Area (acre)
Okavango Delta System	5,537,400	13,683,000

=== Burkina Faso ===
Name	Area (ha)	Area (acre)
Barrage de Bagre	36,793	90,920
Barrage de la Kompienga	16,916	41,800
Barrage de la Tapoa	3,419	8,450
Barrage de Samandéni	68,202	168,530
Barrage de Tougouri	1,221	3,020
Barrage de Yalgo	4,522	11,170
Bassin du Nakanbé-Mané	19,477	48,130
Complexe du Parc Urbain Bãngr – Weoogo et du lac des trois barrages	945	2,340
Complexe d'Aires Protégées Pô-Nazinga-Sissili	301,972.6	746,191
Cône d'épandage de Banh	10,003	24,720
Corridor forestier de la Boucle du Mouhoun	134,553	332,490
Forêt Galerie de Léra	451	1,110
La Forêt Classée et Réserve Partielle de Faune Comoé-Léraba	124,500	308,000
La Mare aux Hippopotames	19,200	47,000
La Mare d'Oursi	45,000	110,000
La Vallée du Sourou	20,926	51,710
Lac Bam	2,693	6,650
Lac de Tingrela	494	1,220
Lac Dem	1,354	3,350
Lac Higa	1,514	3,740
Mare de Darkoye	1,716	4,240
Mare de Yomboli	834.5	2,062
Parc National d'Arly	219,485	542,360
Parc National du W	235,000	580,000
Zone de confluence Mouhoun-Sourou	23,300	58,000

=== Burundi ===
Name	Area (ha)	Area (acre)
Parc National de la Rusizi	10,673	26,370
Parc National de la Ruvubu	50,800	126,000
Paysage Aquatique Protégé du Nord	16,242	40,130
Réserve Naturelle de la Malagarazi	800	2,000

=== Cameroon ===
Name	Area (ha)	Area (acre)
Barombi Mbo Crater Lake	415	1,030
Estuaire du Rio del Rey	165,000	410,000
Partie Camerounaise du Fleuve Ntem	39,848	98,470
Partie Camerounaise du fleuve Sangha	6,200	15,000
Partie Camerounaise du Lac Tchad	12,500	31,000
Waza Logone Floodplain	600,000	1,500,000
Zone Humide d'Ebogo	3,097	7,650

=== Cape Verde ===
Name	Area (ha)	Area (acre)
Curral Velho	600	1,500
Lagoa de Pedra Badejo	200	490
Lagoa de Rabil	300	740
Salinas of the English Port	535	1,320

=== Central African Republic ===
Name	Area (ha)	Area (acre)
Les Rivières de Mbaéré-Bodingué	101,300	250,000
Riviere Sangha située en République Centrafricaine	275,000	680,000

=== Chad ===
Name	Area (ha)	Area (acre)
Lake Fitri	195,000	480,000
Partie tchadienne du lac Tchad	1,648,168	4,072,710
Plaine de Massenya	2,526,000	6,240,000
Plaines d'inondation des Bahr Aouk et Salamat	4,922,000	12,160,000
Plaines d'inondation du Logone et les dépressions Toupouri	2,978,900	7,361,000
Réserve de faune de Binder-Léré	135,000	330,000

=== Comoros ===
Name	Area (ha)	Area (acre)
Lake Dziani Boundouni	30	74
Le Karthala	13,000	32,000
Le Mont Ntringui	3,000	7,400

=== Congo (Republic of the Congo) ===
Name	Area (ha)	Area (acre)
Bas-Kouilou-Yombo	55,124	136,210
Cayo-Loufoualeba	15,366	37,970
Conkouati-Douli	504,950	1,247,800
Grands affluents	5,908,074	14,599,170
La Réserve Communautaire du Lac Télé/Likouala-aux-Herbes	438,960	1,084,700
Leketi-Mbama	774,965	1,914,980
Les Rapides du Congo-Djoué	2,500	6,200
Libenga	59,409	146,800
Loubetsi-Nyanga	251,151.08	620,607.8
Sangha-Nouabalé-Ndoki	1,525,000	3,770,000
Site Ramsar Ntokou-Pikounda	427,200	1,056,000
Site Ramsar Odzala Kokoua	1,300,000	3,200,000
Site Ramsar Vallée du Niari	1,581,000	3,910,000
Tchicapika-Owando	970,165.83	2,397,332.0

=== Democratic Republic of the Congo ===
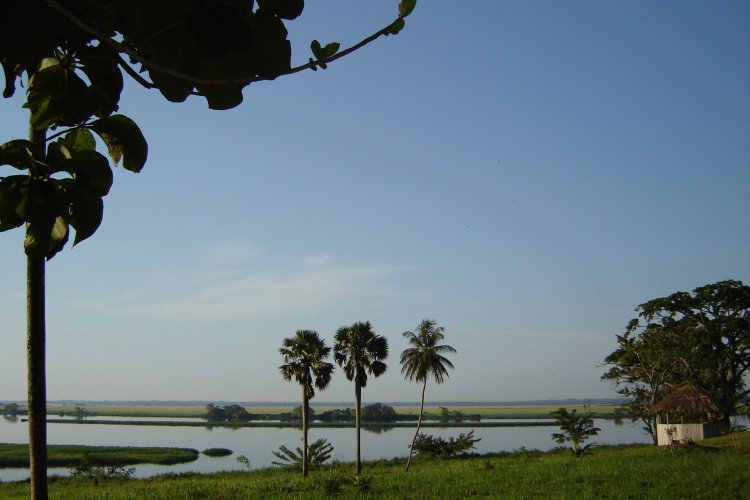
Lake Mai-Ndombe at Tumba-Ngiri-Maindombe, Democratic Republic of the Congo

Name	Area (ha)	Area (acre)
Bassin de la Lufira	4,470,993	11,048,060
Ngiri-Tumba-Maindombe	6,569,624	16,233,890
Mangroves National Park	66,000	160,000
Virunga National Park	800,000	2,000,000

=== Djibouti ===
Name	Area (ha)	Area (acre)
Haramous-Loyada	3,000	7,400

=== Egypt ===
Name	Area (ha)	Area (acre)
Lake Bardawil	59,500	147,000
Lake Burullus	46,200	114,000
Lake Qarun Protected Area	134,042	331,220
Wadi El Rayan Protected Area	175,790	434,400

=== Equatorial Guinea ===
Name	Area (ha)	Area (acre)
Annobón	23,000	57,000
Muni Estuary Natural Reserve	80,000	200,000
Ntem River and Campo River	33,000	82,000

=== Eswatini ===
Name	Area (ha)	Area (acre)
Hawane Dam and Nature Reserve	232	570
Sand River Dam	764	1,890
Van Eck Dam	187	460

=== Gabon ===
Name	Area (ha)	Area (acre)
Bas Ogooue	862,700	2,132,000
Chutes et Rapides sur Ivindo	132,500	327,000
Parc National Akanda	54,000	130,000
Parc National Pongara	92,969	229,730
Petit Loango	480,000	1,200,000
Rapides de Mboungou Badouma et de Doume	59,500	147,000
Setté Cama	220,000	540,000
Site Ramsar des Monts Birougou	536,800	1,326,000
Wongha-Wonghé	380,000	940,000

=== Gambia ===
Name	Area (ha)	Area (acre)
Baobolon Wetland Reserve	20,000	49,000
Niumi National Park	4,940	12,200
Tanbi Wetland Complex	6,304	15,580

=== Ghana ===
Name	Area (ha)	Area (acre)
Densu Delta	5,892.99	14,561.9
Keta Lagoon Complex	101,022.69	249,632.5
Muni-Pomadze Ramsar Site	9,461.12	23,378.9
Owabi	7,260	17,900
Sakumo Ramsar Site	1,364.35	3,371.4
Songor Lagoon	51,133.33	126,353.2

=== Guinea ===
Name	Area (ha)	Area (acre)
Bafing-Falémé	517,300	1,278,000
Bafing-Source	317,200	784,000
Gambie-Koulountou	281,400	695,000
Gambie-Oundou-Liti	527,400	1,303,000
Ile Alcatraz	1	2.5
Ile Blanche	10	25
Îles Tristão	85,000	210,000
Konkouré	90,000	220,000
Niger Source	180,400	446,000
Niger-Mafou	1,015,450	2,509,200
Niger-Niandan-Milo	1,046,400	2,586,000
Niger-Tinkisso	400,600	990,000
Rio Kapatchez	20,000	49,000
Rio Pongo	30,000	74,000
Sankarani-Fié	1,015,200	2,509,000
Tinkisso	896,000	2,210,000

=== Guinea-Bissau ===
Name	Area (ha)
Archipel Bolama-Bijagós	1046950
Lagoa de Cufada	39098
Lagune de Wendu Tcham	14970.18
Parc Naturel des Mangroves du Fleuve Cacheu (PNTC)	88615

=== Ivory Coast ===
Name	Area (ha)	Area (acre)
Complexe Sassandra-Dagbego	10,551	26,070
Fresco	15,507	38,320
Grand Bassam	40,210	99,400
Iles Ehotilé-Essouman	27,274	67,400
N'Ganda N'Ganda	14,402	35,590
Parc national d'Azagny	19,400	48,000

=== Kenya ===
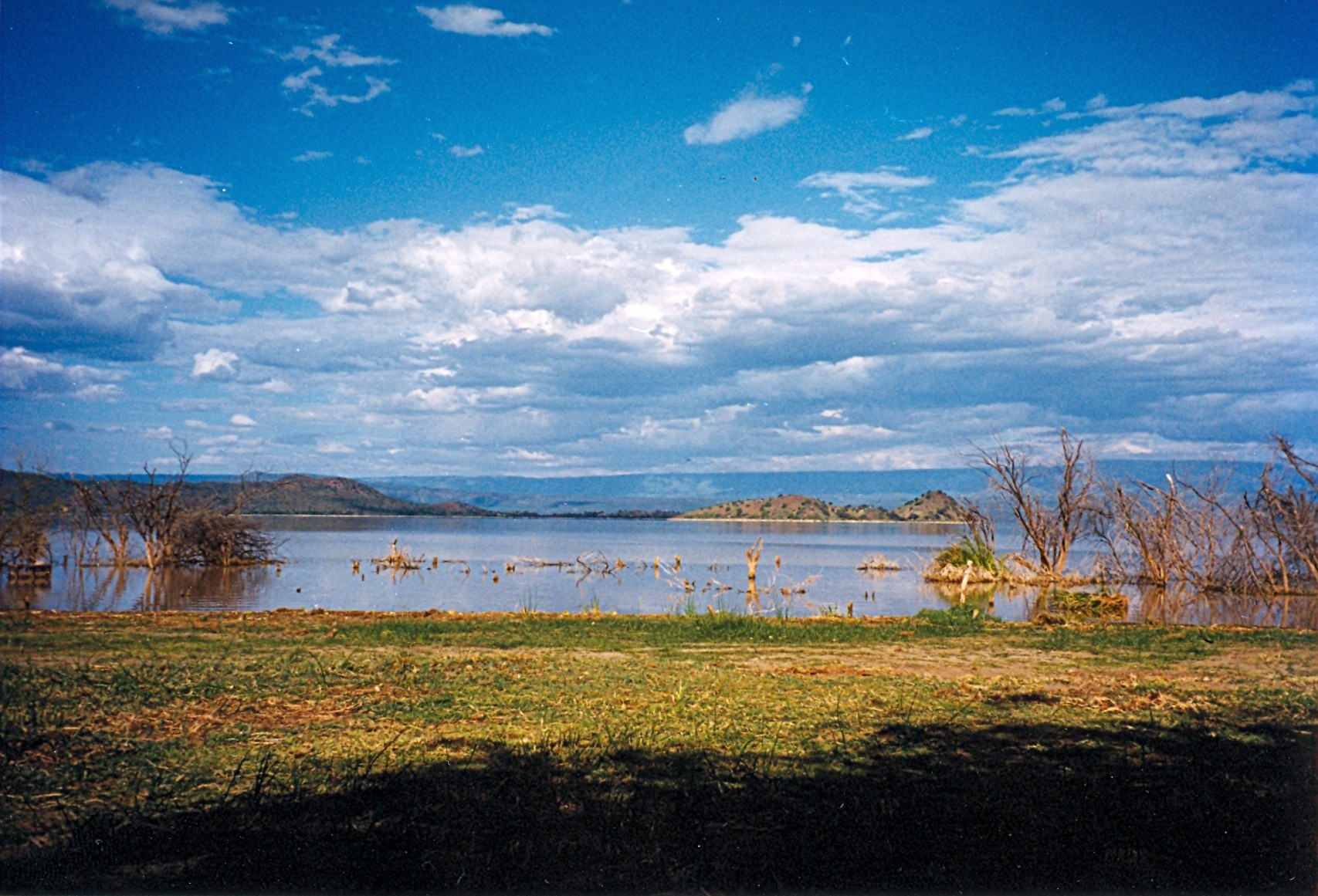
Lake Baringo in Kenya

Name	Area (ha)	Area (acre)
Lake Baringo	31,469	77,760
Lake Bogoria	10,700	26,000
Lake Elmenteita	10,880	26,900
Lake Naivasha	30,000	74,000
Lake Nakuru	18,800	46,000
Tana River Delta Ramsar Site	163,600	404,000

=== Lesotho ===
Name	Area (ha)	Area (acre)
Lets'eng-la-Letsie	434	1,070

=== Liberia ===
Name	Area (ha)	Area (acre)
Gbedin Wetlands	25	62
Kpatawee Wetlands	835	2,060
Lake Piso	76,091	188,020
Marshall Wetlands	12,168	30,070
Mesurado Wetlands	6,760	16,700

=== Libya ===
Name	Area (ha)	Area (acre)
Ain Elshakika	33	82
Ain Elzarga	50	120

=== Madagascar ===
Name	Area (ha)	Area (acre)
Barrière de Corail Nosy Ve Androka	91,445	225,970
Complexe des lacs Ambondro et Sirave (CLAS)	14,481.5	35,785
Complexe des lacs de Manambolomaty	7,491	18,510
Complexe des Zones Humides de Bemanevika	10,000	25,000
Iles Barren	463,200	1,145,000
Lac Kinkony	13,800	34,000
Lac Sofia	1,650	4,100
Le Lac Alaotra : Les Zones Humides et Bassins Versants	722,500	1,785,000
Mangroves de la Baie d'Ambaro	54,000	130,000
Mangroves de Tsiribihina	47,218	116,680
Marais de Torotorofotsy avec leurs bassins versants	9,993	24,690
Parc de Tsarasaotra	5	12
Parc national Tsimanampesotse	203,740	503,500
Rivière Nosivolo et affluents	358,511	885,900
Site Bioculturel d'Antrema	20,620	51,000
Zone Humide de Mandrozo	15,145	37,420
Zones Humides Ankarafantsika (CLSA)	33,145	81,900
Zones humides d'Ambondrobe	13,000	32,000
Zones humides de Bedo	1,962	4,850
Zones humides de l'Onilahy	42,950	106,100
Zones Humides de Sahamalaza	24,049	59,430

=== Malawi ===
Name	Area (ha)	Area (acre)
Elephant Marsh	61,556	152,110
Lake Chilwa	224,800	555,000

=== Mali ===
Name	Area (ha)	Area (acre)
Delta Intérieur du Niger	4,119,500	10,180,000
Lac Magui	24,740	61,100
Lac Wegnia	3,900	9,600
Plaine Inondable du Sourou	56,500	140,000

=== Mauritania ===
Name	Area (ha)	Area (acre)
Chat Tboul	15,500	38,000
Lac Gabou et le réseau hydrographique du Plateau du Tagant	9,500	23,000
Parc National du Banc d'Arguin	1,200,000	3,000,000
Parc National du Diawling	15,600	39,000

=== Mauritius ===
Name	Area (ha)	Area (acre)
Blue Bay Marine Park	353	870
Pointe d'Esny Wetland	22	54
Rivulet Terre Rouge Estuary Bird Sanctuary	26	64

=== Morocco ===
Name	Area (ha)	Area (acre)
Aguelmams Sidi Ali - Tifounassine	600	1,500
Archipel et dunes d'Essawira	4,000	9,900
Assif Mgoun	1,400	3,500
Assifs Ahançal-Melloul	1,385	3,420
Assifs Réghaya-Aït Mizane	830	2,100
Baie d'Ad-Dakhla	40,000	99,000
Baie de Khnifiss	20,000	49,000
Barrage Al Massira	14,000	35,000
Barrage Mohammed V	5,000	12,000
Cap des Trois Fourches	5,000	12,000
Cap Ghir-Imsouane	6,800	17,000
Complexe de Sidi Moussa-Walidia	10,000	25,000
Complexe du bas Loukkos	3,600	8,900
Complexe du bas Tahaddart	11,000	27,000
Côte Aftissate-Boujdour	11,700	29,000
Côte des Bokkoyas	5,530	13,700
Embouchure de la Moulouya	3,000	7,400
Embouchure de l'oued Dr'a	10,000	25,000
Embouchures des oueds Chbeyka-Al Wa'er	8,000	20,000
Haut Oued Lakhdar	2,200	5,400
Lac d'Afennourir	800	2,000
Lacs d'Imouzzer du Kandar	512	1,270
Lacs Isly-Tislite	800	2,000
Lagune et barrage de Smir	837	2,070
Littoral de Jebel Moussa	500	1,200
Marais et côte du Plateau de Rmel	1,300	3,200
Merja de Fouwarate	502	1,240
Merja Sidi Boughaba	650	1,600
Merja Zerga	7,300	18,000
Moyenne Dr'a	45,000	110,000
Oasis du Tafilalet	65,000	160,000
Oued Assaquia Al Hamra à La'youne	9,500	23,000
Oued Tizguite	606	1,500
Sebkha Bou Areg	14,000	35,000
Sebkha Zima	760	1,900
Sebkhat Imlili	1,774	4,380
Zones humides de l'oued El Maleh	1,200	3,000
Zones humides de Souss-Massa	1,000	2,500

=== Mozambique ===
Name	Area (ha)	Area (acre)
Lake Niassa and its Coastal Zone	1,363,700	3,370,000
Zambezi Delta	3,171,172	7,836,140

=== Namibia ===
Name	Area (ha)	Area (acre)
Bwabwata-Okavango Ramsar Site	46,964	116,050
Etosha Pan, Lake Oponono and Cuvelai drainage	600,000	1,500,000
Orange River Mouth	500	1,200
Sandwich Harbour	16,500	41,000
Walvis Bay	12,600	31,000

=== Niger ===
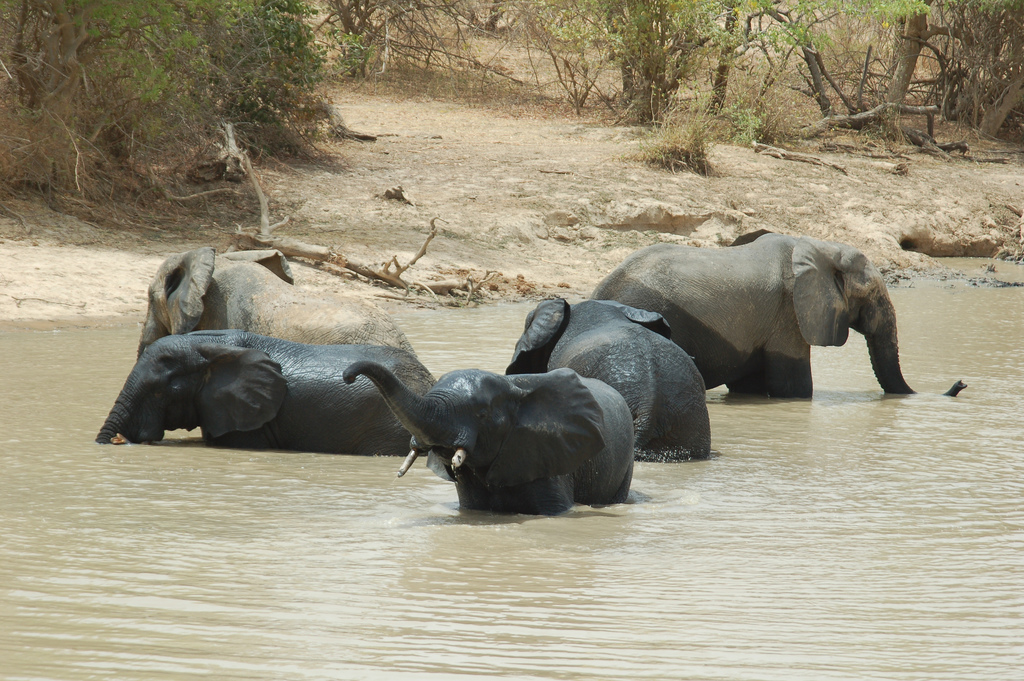
African elephants in W National Park, Niger

Name	Area (ha)	Area (acre)
Complexe Kokorou-Namga	66,829	165,140
Dallol Bosso	376,162	929,520
Dallol Maouri	318,966	788,180
Gueltas et Oasis de l'Aïr	2,413,237	5,963,240
La Mare de Dan Doutchi	25,366	62,680
La Mare de Lassouri	26,737	66,070
La Mare de Tabalak	7,713	19,060
Lac de Guidimouni	338.4	836
Lac de Madarounfa	524.3	1,296
Lac Tchad	340,423	841,200
Oasis du Kawar	368,536	910,670
Parc National du W	235,000	580,000
Zone humide du moyen Niger	88,050	217,600
Zone Humide du Moyen Niger II	65,850	162,700

=== Nigeria ===
Name	Area (ha)	Area (acre)
Ado-Awaye (Iyake) Suspended Lake Wetland	165.3	408
Apoi Creek Forests	29,213	72,190
Arinta Waterfall	181.4	448
Baturiya Wetland	101,095	249,810
Dagona Sanctuary Lake	344	850
Ebute Oni coastal wetland	102.6	254
Foge Islands	4,229	10,450
International Institute of Tropical Agriculture (IITA)	53	130
Lake Chad Wetlands in Nigeria	607,354	1,500,800
Lower Kaduna-Middle Niger Floodplain	229,054	566,000
Maladumba Lake	1,860	4,600
Nguru Lake (and Marma Channel) complex	58,100	144,000
Oguta Lake	572	1,410
Ogoni Mangrove Wetland	31,700	78,000
Osun-Oshogbo Sacred Grove	53.9	133
Pandam and Wase Lakes	19,742	48,780
Upper Orashi Forest	25,165	62,180
Yemoji Lake Ijebu Ode	184.1	455

=== Rwanda ===
Name	Area (ha)	Area (acre)
Rugezi-Bulera-Ruhondo	6,736	16,650

=== São Tomé and Príncipe ===
Name	Area (ha)	Area (acre)
Ilots Tinhosas	23	57

=== Senegal ===
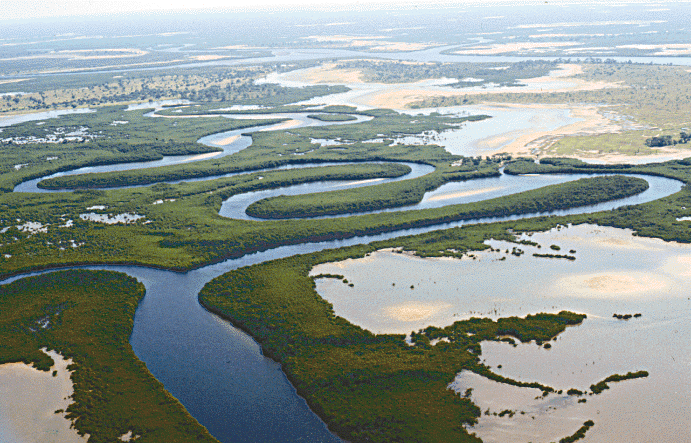
The Saloum Delta in Senegal

Name	Area (ha)	Area (acre)
Kalissaye	30,014	74,170
Parc National de la Langue de Barbarie	2,000	4,900
Parc National des Oiseaux du Djoudj	16,000	40,000
Parc national du Delta du Saloum	73,000	180,000
Réserve Naturelle Communautaire de Palmarin	10,430	25,800
Réserve Naturelle Communautaire de Tocc Tocc	273	670
Réserve Naturelle d'Intérêt Communautaire de la Somone	700	1,700
Réserve Spéciale de Faune de Gueumbeul	720	1,800
Réserve Spéciale de Faune de Ndiaël	10,000	25,000

=== Seychelles ===
Name	Area (ha)	Area (acre)
Aldabra Atoll	43,900	108,000
Mare Aux Cochons High altitude freshwater wetlands	1	2.5
Port Launay Coastal Wetlands	124	310

=== Sierra Leone ===
Name	Area (ha)	Area (acre)
Sierra Leone River Estuary	295,000	730,000

=== South Africa ===
Name	Area (ha)	Area (acre)
Agulhas Plain	23,984	59,270
Barberspan	3,118	7,700
Berg Estuary Ramsar Site	1,162.8	2,873
Blesbokspruit	1,858	4,590
Bot - Kleinmond Estuarine System	1,350	3,300
Dassen Island Nature Reserve	737	1,820
De Berg Nature Reserve	1,265.4	3,127
De Hoop Vlei	750	1,900
De Mond	918	2,270
Dyer Island Provincial Nature Reserve and Geyser Island Provincial Nature Reserve	288	710
False Bay Nature Reserve	1,542	3,810
Ingula Nature Reserve	8,084	19,980
Kgaswane Mountain Reserve	4,952.4	12,238
Kosi Bay	10,982	27,140
Lake Sibaya	7,750	19,200
Langebaan	6,000	15,000
Makuleke Wetlands	7,757	19,170
Middelpunt Nature Reserve	510.3	1,261
Mkambati Nature Reserve	7,720	19,100
Natal Drakensberg Park	242,813	600,000
Ndumo Game Reserve	10,117	25,000
Ntsikeni Nature Reserve	9,200	23,000
Nylsvley Nature Reserve	3,970	9,800
Orange River Mouth	2,000	4,900
Prince Edward Islands	37,500	93,000
Seekoeivlei Nature Reserve	4,754	11,750
St Lucia System	155,500	384,000
Turtle Beaches/Coral Reefs of Tongaland	39,500	98,000
uMgeni Vlei Nature Reserve	958	2,370
Verloren Valei Nature Reserve	5,891	14,560
Verlorenvlei	1,500	3,700
Wilderness Lakes	1,300	3,200

=== South Sudan ===
Name	Area (ha)	Area (acre)
Sudd	5,700,000	14,000,000

=== Sudan ===
Name	Area (ha)	Area (acre)
Dinder National Park	1,084,600	2,680,000
Dongonab Bay-Marsa Waiai	280,000	690,000
Khor Abu Habil Inner Delta	946,409	2,338,630
Suakin-Gulf of Agig	1,125,000	2,780,000

=== Togo ===
Name	Area (ha)	Area (acre)
Bassin versant Oti-Mandouri	425,000	1,050,000
Parc national de la Keran	163,400	404,000
Reserve de faune de Togodo	31,000	77,000
Zones Humides du Littoral du Togo	591,000	1,460,000

=== Tunisia ===
Name	Area (ha)	Area (acre)
Ain Dahab	560	1,400
Bahiret el Bibane	39,266	97,030
Barrage de Sidi El Barrak	2,734	6,760
Barrage de Sidi Saad	8,650	21,400
Barrage Lebna	1,147	2,830
Barrage Merguellil	714	1,760
Barrage Mlaabi	98	240
Barrage Oued El Hajar	254	630
Barrage Oued Ermal	620	1,500
Barrage Sidi Abdelmoneem	31	77
Chott El Jerid	586,187	1,448,500
Chott Elguetar	7,400	18,000
Complexe des zones humides de Barrage Ghdir El Goulla et Barrage El Mornaguia	273	670
Complexe des zones humides de Sebkhet Oum Ez-Zessar et Sebkhet El Grine	9,195	22,720
Complexe des zones humides des Chott el Guetayate et Sebkhet Dhreia et Oueds Akarit, Rekhama et Meleh	4,845	11,970
Complexe Lac de Tunis	2,243	5,540
Djerba Bin El Ouedian	12,082	29,860
Djerba Guellala	2,285	5,650
Djerba Ras Rmel	1,856	4,590
Garâa Sejenane	4,322	10,680
Garaet Sidi Mansour	2,426	5,990
Golfe de Boughrara	12,880	31,800
Ichkeul	12,600	31,000
Iles Kerkennah ou L'archipel de Kerkennah	15,000	37,000
Iles Kneiss avec leurs zones intertidales	22,027	54,430
Lac et tourbière de Mejen Ech Chitan	7	17
Lagune de Ghar el Melh et Delta de la Mejerda	10,168	25,130
Lagunes du Cap Bon oriental	504	1,250
Les Gorges de Thelja	675	1,670
Les Tourbières de Dar Fatma	13	32
Marais d'eau douce Garaet Douza	1,400	3,500
Oued Dekouk	5,750	14,200
Réserve naturelle de Saddine	2,610	6,400
Salines de Monastir	1,000	2,500
Salines de Thyna	3,343	8,260
Sebkhet Halk Elmanzel et Oued Essed	1,450	3,600
Sebkhet Kelbia	8,732	21,580
Sebkhet Noual	17,060	42,200
Sebkhet Sejoumi	2,979	7,360
Sebkhet Sidi Elhani	36,000	89,000
Sebkhet Soliman	880	2,200
Zones humides oasiennes de Kebili	2,419	5,980

=== Uganda ===
Name	Area (ha)	Area (acre)
Lake Bisina Wetland System	54,229	134,000
Lake George	15,000	37,000
Lake Mburo-Nakivali Wetland System	26,834	66,310
Lake Nabugabo wetland system	22,000	54,000
Lake Nakuwa Wetland System	91,150	225,200
Lake Opeta Wetland System	68,912	170,290
Lutembe Bay Wetland System	98	240
Mabamba Bay Wetland System	2,424	5,990
Murchison Falls-Albert Delta Wetland System	17,293	42,730
Nabajjuzi Wetland system	1,753	4,330
Rwenzori Mountains Ramsar Site	99,500	246,000
Sango Bay-Musambwa Island-Kagera Wetland System (SAMUKA)	55,110	136,200

=== Tanzania ===
Name	Area (ha)	Area (acre)
Kilombero Valley Floodplain	796,735	1,968,780
Lake Natron Basin	224,781	555,450
Malagarasi-Muyovozi Wetlands	3,250,000	8,000,000
Rufiji-Mafia-Kilwa Marine Ramsar Site	596,908	1,474,990

=== Zambia ===
Name	Area (ha)	Area (acre)
Bangweulu Swamps	1,100,000	2,700,000
Busanga Swamps	200,000	490,000
Kafue Flats	600,500	1,484,000
Luangwa Flood Plains	250,000	620,000
Lukanga Swamps	260,000	640,000
Mweru wa Ntipa	490,000	1,200,000
Tanganyika	230,000	570,000
Zambezi Floodplains	900,000	2,200,000

=== Zimbabwe ===
Name	Area (ha)	Area (acre)
Chinhoyi Caves Recreational Park	33.35	82.4
Cleveland Dam	1,050	2,600
Driefontein Grasslands	201,194	497,160
Lake Chivero and Manyame	29,260	72,300
Mana Pools	0	0
Monavale Wetland	507	1,250
Victoria Falls National Park	1,750	4,300

== Asia ==
=== Bahrain ===
Name	Area (ha)	Area (acre)
Hawar Islands	5,200	13,000
Tubli Bay	1,610	4,000

=== Bangladesh ===
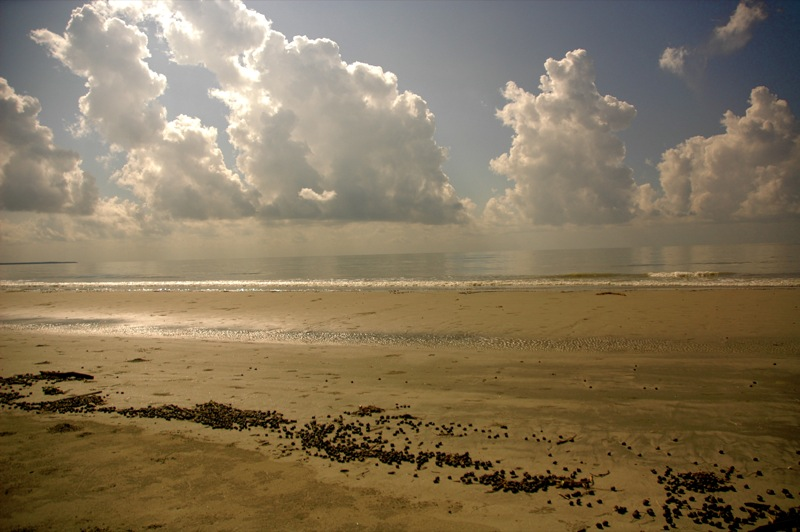
Mudflats in Sundarbans Reserved Forest in Bangladesh

Name	Area (ha)	Area (acre)
Sundarbans Reserved Forest	601,700	1,487,000
Tanguar Haor	9,500	23,000

=== Bhutan ===
Name	Area (ha)	Area (acre)
Bumdeling	142	350
Gangtey-Phobji	970	2,400
Khotokha	114	280

=== Cambodia ===
Name	Area (ha)	Area (acre)
Boeng Chhmar and Associated River System and Floodplain	28,000	69,000
Koh Kapik and Associated Islets	12,000	30,000
Middle Stretches of Mekong River North of Stoeng Treng	14,600	36,000
Prek Toal Ramsar Site	21,342	52,740
Stung Sen Wildlife Sanctuary	9,293	22,960

=== China ===
Name	Area (ha)	Area (acre)
Anhui Shengjin Lake National Nature Reserve	33,340	82,400
Beijing Yeya Lake Wetlands	4,007.8	9,903
Bitahai Wetland	1,985	4,910
Chongming Dongtan Nature Reserve, Shanghai	32,600	81,000
Dafeng National Nature Reserve	78,000	190,000
Dalai Lake National Nature Reserve, Inner Mongolia	740,000	1,800,000
Dalian National Spotted Seal Nature Reserve	11,700	29,000
Dashanbao	5,958	14,720
Dong dongting hu	190,000	470,000
Dongfanghong Wetland National Nature Reserve	31,538	77,930
Dongzhaigang	5,400	13,000
Eerduosi National Nature Reserve	7,680	19,000
Eling Lake	65,907	162,860
Fujian Minjiang River Estuary Wetlands	2,100	5,200
Fujian Zhangjiangkou National Mangrove Nature Reserve	2,358	5,830
Gansu Dunhuang Xihu Wetlands	192,287	475,150
Gansu Gahai Wetlands Nature Reserve	247,431	611,420
Gansu Yanchiwan Wetlands	29,876.2	73,826
Gansu Yellow River Shouqu Wetlands	132,067	326,340
Guangdong Guangzhou Haizhu Wetlands	751.4	1,857
Guangdong Haifeng Wetlands	11,591	28,640
Guangdong Nanpeng Archipelago Wetlands	35,679	88,160
Guangdong Shenzhen Futian Mangrove Wetlands	367.6	908
Guangxi Beihai Jinhaiwan Mangrove Wetlands	1,357.8	3,355
Guangxi Beilun Estuary National Nature Reserve	3,000	7,400
Guangxi Guilin Huixian Karst Wetlands	586.8	1,450
Hangzhou Xixi Wetlands	325	800
Heilongjiang Grand Khingan Jiuqushibawan Wetlands	4,929	12,180
Heilongjiang Grand Khingan Shuangheyuan Wetlands	8,712	21,530
Heilongjiang Hadong Yanjiang Wetlands	9,973.6	24,645
Heilongjiang Nanweng River National Nature Reserve	229,523	567,160
Heilongjiang Qixing River National Nature Reserve	20,000	49,000
Heilongjiang Youhao Wetlands	60,687	149,960
Heilongjiang Zhenbaodao Wetland National Nature Reserve	44,364	109,630
Henan Minquan Yellow River Gudao Wetlands	2,303.5	5,692
Honghe National Nature Reserve	21,836	53,960
Hubei Chen Lake Wetland Nature Reserve	11,579	28,610
Hubei Dajiu Lake Wetland	9,320	23,000
Hubei Gong'an Chong Lake Wetlands	1,259.7	3,113
Hubei Honghu Wetlands	43,450	107,400
Hubei Wang Lake	20,495	50,640
Hubei Xiantao Sha Lake Wetlands	2,167.4	5,356
Huidong Harbor Sea Turtle National Nature Reserve	400	990
Hunan Chongling Wetlands	2,401.7	5,935
Hunan Maoli Lake Wetlands	4,776	11,800
Inner Mongolia Bila River Wetlands	56,604	139,870
Inner Mongolia Grand Khingan Hanma Wetlands	107,348	265,260
Jiangsu Huai'an Baima Lake Wetlands	2,796.1	6,909
Jiangxi Poyang Lake Nanji Wetlands	33,300	82,000
Jilin Hani Wetlands	3,571.5	8,825
Jilin Momoge National Nature Reserve	144,000	360,000
Lashihai Wetland	3,560	8,800
Mai Po Marshes and Inner Deep Bay	1,540	3,800
Maidika	43,496	107,480
Mapangyong Cuo	73,782	182,320
Nan Dongting Wetland and Waterfowl Nature Reserve	168,000	420,000
Napahai Wetland	2,083	5,150
Niaodao	53,600	132,000
Poyanghu	22,400	55,000
Qinghai Longbaotan Wetlands	9,529	23,550
San Jiang National Nature Reserve	164,400	406,000
Shandong Jining Nansi Lake	50,761.6	125,435
Shandong Yellow River Delta Wetland	95,950	237,100
Shanghai Yangtze Estuarine Wetland Nature Reserve for Chinese Sturgeon	3,760	9,300
Shankou Mangrove Nature Reserve	4,000	9,900
Shuangtai Estuary	128,000	320,000
Sichuan Changshahongma Wetlands	669,800	1,655,000
Sichuan Ruoergai Wetland National Nature Reserve	166,570	411,600
Sichuan Seda Nilaba Wetlands	60,760	150,100
Tianjin Beidagang Wetlands	1,130	2,800
Tibet Selincuo Wetlands	1,893,630	4,679,300
Tibet Trari Nam Co Wetlands	142,982	353,320
Xi dongting lake nature reserve	35,000	86,000
Xianghai	105,467	260,610
Xingkai Lake National Nature Reserve	222,488	549,780
Yancheng National Nature Reserve	453,000	1,120,000
Yunnan Huize Nianhu Wetlands	453,000	1,120,000
Zhaling Lake	64,920	160,400
Zhalong	210,000	520,000
Zhangye Heihe Wetland National Nature Reserve	41,164.56	101,719.8
Zhanjiang Mangrove National Nature Reserve	20,279	50,110
Zhejiang Pingyang Nanji Islands Wetlands	19,892.9	49,156

=== India ===
Name	Area (ha)	Area (acre)
Aghanashini Estuary	4,801	11,860
Ankasamudra Bird Conservation Reserve	98.8	244
Ansupa Lake	231	570
Asan Conservation Reserve	444.4	1,098
Ashtamudi Wetland; A chain of brackish Kerala backwaters lagoons and lakes lying parallel to the Arabian Sea Malabar Coast of Kerala	61,400	152,000
Bakhira Wildlife Sanctuary	2,894	7,150
Beas Conservation Reserve	6,428.9	15,886
Bhindawas Wildlife Sanctuary	412	1,020
Bhitarkanika Mangroves; India's second largest mangrove are home of olive ridley turtle in India's Odisha state in the Brahmani river and Baitarani river delta	65,000	160,000
Bhoj Wetland; Consists of the two lakes, Bhojtal and Lower Lake, located in Bhopal in Madhya Pradesh state,	3,201	7,910
Chandra Taal; Situated in the Spiti valley of the Lahul and Spiti district of Himachal Pradesh	49	120
Chhari Dhand	22,700	56,000
Chilika Lake; Spread over the Puri district, Khurda district and Ganjam districts of Odisha at the mouth of the Daya River, flows into the Bay of Bengal	116,500	288,000
Chitrangudi Bird Sanctuary	260.5	644
Deepor Beel; Assam	4,000	9,900
East Calcutta Wetlands	12,500	31,000
Gogabil Lake	86.6	214
Gokul Jalashay	448.0	1,107
Gulf of Mannar Marine Biosphere Reserve	52,671.9	130,155
Haiderpur Wetland	6,908	17,070
Harike Wetland	4,100	10,000
Hirakud Reservoir	65,400	162,000
Hokera Wetland; Located at the northwest Himalayan biogeopgraphic province of Kashmir, near the snow-draped Pir Panjal.	1,375	3,400
Hygam Wetland Conservation Reserve	801.8	1,981
Kabartal Wetland	2,620	6,500
Kanjirankulam Bird Sanctuary	96.9	239
Kanjli Wetland	183	450
Karaivetti Bird Sanctuary	453.7	1,121
Karikili Bird Sanctuary	58.4	144
Kazhuveli Bird Sanctuary	5,151.6	12,730
Keoladeo National Park	2,873	7,100
Keshopur-Miani Community Reserve	343.9	850
Khachoedpalri wetland	172	430
Khichan wetland	54.2	134
Khijadia Wildlife Sanctuary	511.7	1,264
Kolleru Lake	90,100	223,000
Koonthankulam Bird Sanctuary	72	180
Kopra Jalashay	210	520
Loktak Lake	26,600	66,000
Lonar Lake	427	1,060
Longwood Shola Reserve Forest	116	290
Magadi Kere Conservation Reserve	54.4	134
Menar Wetland Complex	463.4	1,145
Nagi Bird Sanctuary	205.8	509
Nakti Bird Sanctuary	332.6	822
Nal Sarovar Bird Sanctuary	12,000	30,000
Nanda Lake	42	100
Nandur Madhameshwar	1,437	3,550
Nangal Wildlife Sanctuary	116	290
Nanjarayan Bird Sanctuary	125.9	311
Nawabganj Bird Sanctuary	224.6	555
Pala Wetland	1,850	4,600
Pallikaranai Marsh Reserve Forest	1,247.5	3,083
Parvati Arga Bird Sanctuary	722	1,780
Patna Bird Sanctuary	108.9	269
Pichavaram Mangrove	1,478.6	3,654
Point Calimere Wildlife and Bird Sanctuary	38,500	95,000
Pong Dam Lake	15,662	38,700
Ranganathittu Bird Sanctuary	517.7	1,279
Renuka Lake	20	49
Ropar Wetland	1,365	3,370
Rudrasagar Lake	240	590
Sakhya Sagar	248	610
Sakkarakottai Bird Sanctuary	230.5	570
Saman Bird Sanctuary	526.3	1,301
Samaspur Bird Sanctuary	799.4	1,975
Sambhar Lake	24,000	59,000
Sandi Bird Sanctuary	308.5	762
Sarsai Nawar Jheel	161.3	399
Sasthamkotta Lake	373	920
Satkosia Gorge	98,196.7	242,649
Shallbugh Wetland Conservation Reserve	1,675	4,140
Siliserh Lake	316	780
Sirpur Wetland	161	400
Suchindram Theroor Wetland Complex	94.2	233
Sultanpur National Park	142.5	352
Sundarban Wetland	423,000	1,050,000
Sur Sarovar	431	1,070
Surinsar-Mansar Lakes	350	860
Tampara Lake	300	740
Tawa Reservoir	20,050	49,500
Thane Creek	6,521.1	16,114
Therthangal Bird Sanctuary	29.3	72
Thol Lake Wildlife Sanctuary	699	1,730
Tso Kar Wetland Complex	9,577	23,670
Tsomoriri	12,000	30,000
Udaipur Jheel	319.0	788
Udhayamarthandapuram Bird Sanctuary	43.8	108
Udhwa Lake Bird Sanctuary	935.5	2,312
Upper Ganga River	26,590	65,700
Vaduvur Bird Sanctuary	112.6	278
Vedanthangal Bird Sanctuary	40.3	100
Vellode Bird Sanctuary	77.2	191
Vembanad-Kol Wetland	151,250	373,700
Vembannur Wetland Complex	19.7	49
Wadhvana Wetland	630	1,600
Wular Lake	18,900	47,000
Yashwant Sagar	822.9	2,033

=== Indonesia ===
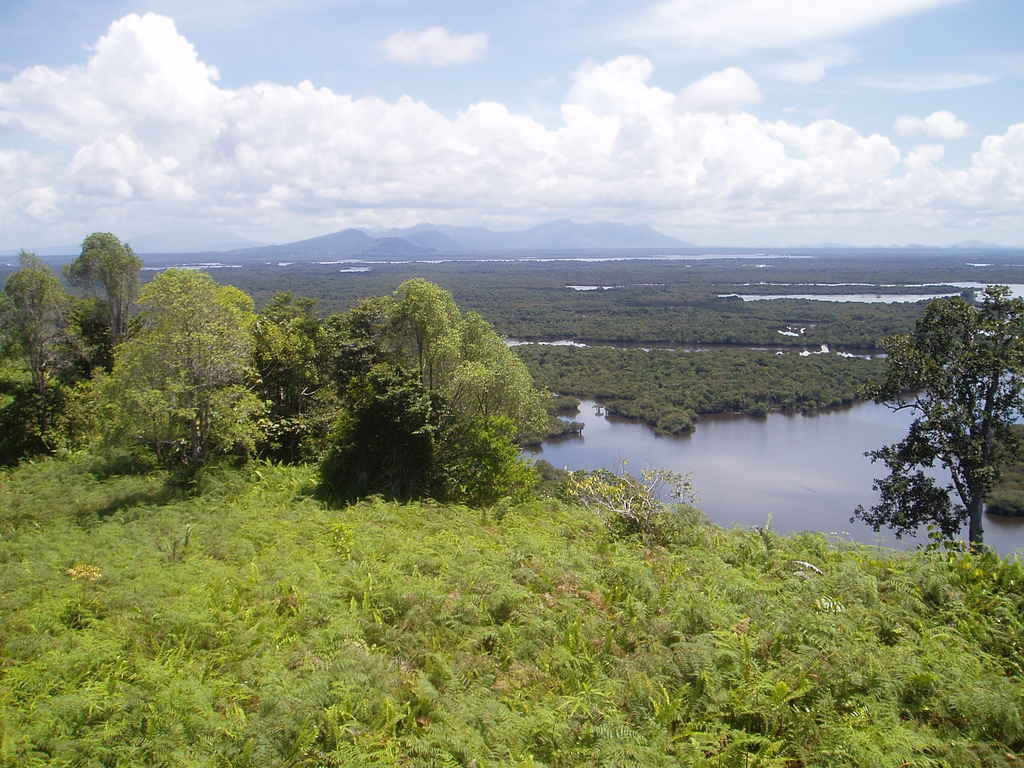
Danau Sentarum in Indonesia

Name	Area (ha)	Area (acre)
Berbak	162,700	402,000
Danau Sentarum	80,000	200,000
Menipo Nature Recreational Park	2,449.5	6,053
Pulau Rambut Wildlife Reserve	90	220
Rawa Aopa Watumohai National Park	105,194	259,940
Sembilang National Park	202,896	501,370
Tanjung Puting National Park	408,286	1,008,900
Wasur National Park	413,810	1,022,500

=== Iran ===
Name	Area (ha)	Area (acre)
Alagol, Ulmagol and Ajigol Lakes	1,400	3,500
Amirkelayeh Lake	1,230	3,000
Anzali Wetland Complex	15,000	37,000
Barm Alvan	20	49
Bujagh National Park	3,177	7,850
Choghakhor Wetland	1,687	4,170
Deltas of Rud-e-Gaz and Rud-e-Hara	15,000	37,000
Deltas of Rud-e-Shur, Rud-e-Shirin and Rud-e-Minab	45,000	110,000
Fereydoon Kenar, Ezbaran & Sorkh Ruds Ab-Bandans	5,427	13,410
Gandoman	1,070	2,600
Gavkhouni Lake and marshes of the lower Zaindeh Rud	43,000	110,000
Gomishan Lagoon	17,700	44,000
Govater Bay and Hur-e-Bahu	75,000	190,000
Hamun-e-Puzak, south end	10,000	25,000
Hamun-e-Saberi & Hamun-e-Helmand	50,000	120,000
Kanibarazan Wetland	927	2,290
Khuran Straits	100,000	250,000
Lake Gori	120	300
Lake Kobi	1,200	3,000
Lake Parishan and Dasht-e-Arjan	6,200	15,000
Lake Urmia or Orumiyeh	483,000	1,190,000
Miankaleh Peninsula, Gorgan Bay and Lapoo-Zaghmarz Ab-bandan	100,000	250,000
Neiriz Lakes & Kamjan Marshes	108,000	270,000
Shadegan Marshes & mudflats of Khor-al Amaya & Khor Musa	400,000	990,000
Sheedvar Island	870	2,100
Shurgol, Yadegarlu & Dorgeh Sangi Lakes	2,500	6,200

=== Iraq ===
Name	Area (ha)	Area (acre)
Central Marshes	219,700	543,000
Hammar Marsh	180,000	440,000
Hawizeh Marsh	137,700	340,000
Sawa Lake	500	1,200

=== Occupied Palestine ===
Name	Area (ha)	Area (acre)
En Afeq Nature Reserve	66	160
Hula Nature Reserve	300	740

=== Japan ===
Name	Area (ha)	Area (acre)
Akan-ko	1,318	3,260
Akiyoshidai Groundwater System	563	1,390
Akkeshi-ko and Bekambeushi-shitsugen	5,277	13,040
Arao-higata	754	1,860
Biwa-ko	65,984	163,050
Fujimae-higata	323	800
Furen-ko and Shunkuni-tai	6,139	15,170
Higashiyoka-higata	218	540
Hinuma	935	2,310
Hizen Kashima-higata	57	140
Hotokenuma	222	550
Hyo-ko	24	59
Imuta-ike	60	150
Izu-numa and Uchi-numa	559	1,380
Izumi Wintering Habitat of Cranes	478	1,180
Kabukuri-numa and the surrounding rice paddies	423	1,050
Kasai Marine Park	366.9	907
Katano-kamoike	10	25
Kejo-numa	34	84
Keramashoto Coral Reef	8,290	20,500
Kiritappu-shitsugen	2,504	6,190
Kuju Bogatsuru and Tadewara-shitsugen	91	220
Kushimoto Coral Communities	574	1,420
Kushiro-shitsugen	7,863	19,430
Kutcharo-ko	1,607	3,970
Lake Inawashiro	10,960.0	27,083
Lower Maruyama River and the surrounding rice paddies	1,094	2,700
Manko	58	140
Mikata-goko	1,110	2,700
Miyajima	142	350
Miyajima-numa	41	100
Nagura Ampuru	157	390
Nakaikemi-shicchi	87	210
Nakaumi	8,043	19,870
Notsuke-hanto and Notsuke-wan	6,053	14,960
Oku-Nikko-shitsugen	260	640
Onuma	1,236	3,050
Oyama Kami-ike and Shimo-ike	39	96
Oze	8,711	21,530
Sakata	76	190
Sarobetsu-genya	2,560	6,300
Shinji-ko	7,652	18,910
Shizugawa-wan	5,793	14,310
Streams in Kume-jima	255	630
Tateyama Midagahara and Dainichidaira	574	1,420
Tofutsu-ko	900	2,200
Tokai Hilly Land Spring-fed Mires	23	57
Uryunuma-shitsugen	624	1,540
Utonai-ko	510	1,300
Watarase-yusuichi	2,861	7,070
Yakushima Nagata-hama	10	25
Yatsu-higata	40	99
Yonahawan	704	1,740
Yoshigadaira Wetlands	887	2,190

=== Jordan ===
Name	Area (ha)	Area (acre)
Azraq Oasis	7,372	18,220
Fifa Nature Reserve	6,100	15,000

=== Kazakhstan ===
Name	Area (ha)	Area (acre)
Alakol-Sasykkol Lakes System	914,663	2,260,180
Ili River Delta and South Lake Balkhash	976,630	2,413,300
Koibagar-Tyuntyugur Lake System	58,000	140,000
Kulykol-Taldykol Lake System	8,300	21,000
Lakes of the lower Turgay and Irgiz	348,000	860,000
Lesser Aral Sea and Delta of the Syrdarya River	330,000	820,000
Naurzum Lake System	139,714	345,240
Tengiz-Korgalzhyn Lake System	353,341	873,120
Ural River Delta and adjacent Caspian Sea coast	111,500	276,000
Zharsor-Urkash Lake System	41,250	101,900

=== Kuwait ===
Name	Area (ha)	Area (acre)
Mubarak Al-Kabeer Reserve	50,948	125,900

=== Kyrgyzstan ===
Name	Area (ha)	Area (acre)
Chatyr Kul	16,100	40,000
Son-Kol Lake	36,869	91,110
The Issyk-kul State Nature Reserve with the Issyk-kul Lake	626,439	1,547,960

=== Laos ===
Name	Area (ha)	Area (acre)
Beung Kiat Ngong Wetlands	2,360	5,800
Xe Champhone Wetlands	12,400	31,000

=== Lebanon ===
Name	Area (ha)	Area (acre)
Aammiq Wetland	280	690
Deir el Nouriyeh cliffs of Ras Chekaa	0	0
Palm Islands Nature Reserve	415	1,030
Tyre Beach	380	940

=== Malaysia ===
Name	Area (ha)	Area (acre)
Kuching Wetlands National Park	6,610	16,300
Lower Kinabatangan-Segama Wetlands	78,803	194,730
Pulau Kukup	647	1,600
Sungai Pulai	9,126	22,550
Tanjung Piai	526	1,300
Tasek Bera	38,446	95,000
Kota Kinabalu Wetland Centre	24	59

=== Mongolia ===
Name	Area (ha)	Area (acre)
Ayrag Nuur	45,000	110,000
Har Us Nuur National Park	321,360	794,100
Lake Achit and its surrounding wetlands	73,730	182,200
Lake Buir and its surrounding wetlands	104,000	260,000
Lake Ganga and its surrounding wetlands	3,280	8,100
Lake Uvs and its surrounding wetlands	585,000	1,450,000
Lakes in the Khurkh-Khuiten river valley	42,940	106,100
Mongol Daguur	210,000	520,000
Ogii Nuur	2,510	6,200
Terhiyn Tsagaan Nuur	6,110	15,100
Valley of the Lakes	45,600	113,000

=== Myanmar ===
Name	Area (ha)	Area (acre)
Gulf of Mottama	161,030	397,900
Indawgyi Wildlife Sanctuary	47,884.38	118,324.9
Inlay Lake Ramsar Site	5,797.6	14,326
Meinmahla Kyun Wildlife Sanctuary	50,000	120,000
Moeyungyi Wetland Wildlife Sanctuary	10,359	25,600
Nanthar Island and Mayyu Estuary	3,608	8,920
Pyu Lake	234	580

=== Nepal ===
Name	Area (ha)	Area (acre)
Beeshazar and Associated Lakes	3,200	7,900
Ghodaghodi Lake Area	2,563	6,330
Gokyo and associated lakes	7,770	19,200
Gosaikunda and Associated Lakes	1,030	2,500
Jagadishpur Reservoir	225	560
Koshi Tappu	17,500	43,000
Lake Cluster of Pokhara Valley	26,106	64,510
Mai Pokhari	90	220
Phoksundo Lake	494	1,220
Rara Lake	1,583	3,910

=== North Korea ===
Name	Area (ha)	Area (acre)
Mundok Migratory Bird Reserve	3,715	9,180
Rason Migratory Bird Reserve	3,526	8,710

=== Oman ===
Name	Area (ha)	Area (acre)
Al Ansab Wetland	54	130
Qurm Nature Reserve	106.83	264.0
Wetlands Reserve in Al Wusta Governorate	213,714.9	528,101

=== Pakistan ===
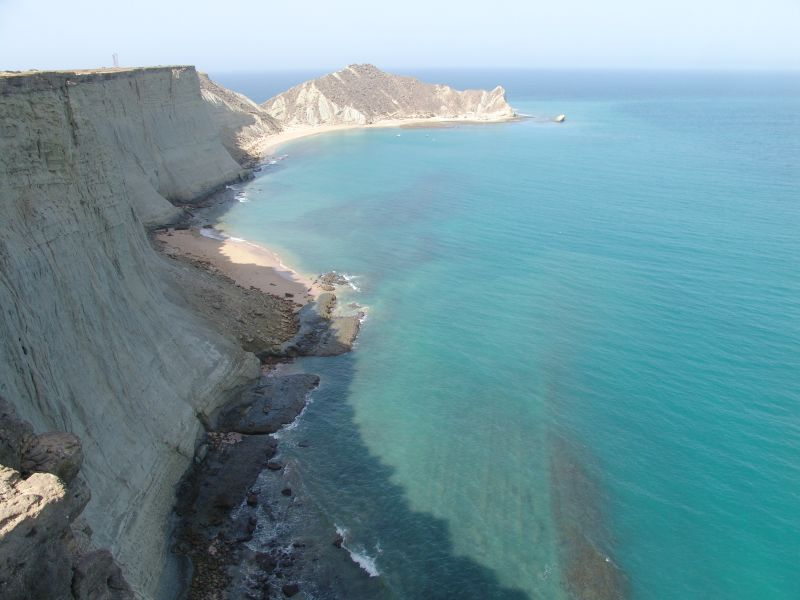
Astola Island in Pakistan

Name	Area (ha)	Area (acre)
Astola Island	5,000	12,000
Chashma Barrage	34,099	84,260
Deh Akro-II Desert Wetland Complex	20,500	51,000
Drigh Lake	164	410
Haleji Lake	1,704	4,210
Hub Dam	27,000	67,000
Indus Delta	472,800	1,168,000
Indus Dolphin Reserve	125,000	310,000
Jiwani Coastal Wetland	4,600	11,000
Jubho Lagoon	706	1,740
Kinjhar Lake	13,468	33,280
Miani Hor	55,000	140,000
Nurri Lagoon	2,540	6,300
Ormara Turtle Beaches	2,400	5,900
Runn of Kutch	566,375	1,399,540
Tanda Dam	405	1,000
Taunsa Barrage	6,576	16,250
Thanedar Wala	4,047	10,000
Uchhali Complex	1,243	3,070

=== Philippines ===
Name	Area (ha)	Area (acre)
Agusan Marsh Wildlife Sanctuary	14,836	36,660
Del Carmen Mangrove Reserve (DCMR) in Siargao Island Protected Landscape and Seascape (SIPLAS)	8,654.4	21,385
Las Piñas–Parañaque Critical Habitat and Ecotourism Area	175	430
Naujan Lake National Park	14,568	36,000
Olango Island Wildlife Sanctuary	5,800	14,000
Puerto Princesa Subterranean River National Park	22,202	54,860
Sasmuan Pampanga Coastal Wetlands	3,667.3	9,062
Sibugay Wetland Nature Reserve	175,551.1	433,796
Tubbataha Reefs Natural Park	96,828	239,270
Negros Occidental Coastal Wetlands Conservation Area	89,607.8	221,426

=== Saudi Arabia ===
Name	Area (ha)	Area (acre)
Farasan Islands Biosphere Reserve	10,609.0	26,215

=== South Korea ===
Name	Area (ha)	Area (acre)
1100 Altitude Wetland	13	32
Daebudo Tidal Flat	453	1,120
Dongbaekdongsan	59	150
Dongcheon Estuary	540	1,300
Du-ung Wetland Ramsar Site	6	15
Ganghwa Maehwamarum Habitat	1	2.5
Gochang and Buan Tidal Flats	4,550	11,200
Han River-Bamseom Islets	27	67
Hanbando Wetland Ramsar Site	191.5	473
Jangdo Wetland	9	22
Janghang Wetland	595.8	1,472
Jeungdo Tidal Flat	3,130	7,700
Moojechineup	4	9.9
Muan Tidal Flat	3,589	8,870
Muljangori-oreum wetland	63	160
Mulyeongari-oreum Ramsar Site	31	77
Mungyeong Doline Wetland	49.4	122
Odaesan National Park Wetlands	2	4.9
Pyeongdume Wetland	2.3	5.7
Seocheon Tidal Flat	1,530	3,800
Songdo Tidal Flat	611	1,510
Sumeunmulbaengdui Ramsar Site	117.5	290
Suncheon Bay	3,550	8,800
The High Moor, Yongneup of Mt. Daeam	106	260
Ungok Wetland	180	440
Upo Wetland	854	2,110

=== Sri Lanka ===
Name	Area (ha)	Area (acre)
Annaiwilundawa Tanks Sanctuary	1,397	3,450
Bundala	6,210	15,300
Kumana Wetland Cluster	19,011	46,980
Maduganga	915	2,260
Vankalai Sanctuary	4,839	11,960
Wilpattu Ramsar Wetland Cluster	165,800	410,000

=== Syria ===
Name	Area (ha)	Area (acre)
Sabkhat al-Jabbul Nature Reserve	10,000	25,000

=== Tajikistan ===
Name	Area (ha)	Area (acre)
Karakul Lake	36,400	90,000
Kayrakum Reservoir	52,000	130,000
Lower part of Panj River	0	0
Shorkul and Rangkul Lakes	2,400	5,900
Zorkul Lake	3,800	9,400

=== Thailand ===
Name	Area (ha)	Area (acre)
Bung Khong Long Non-Hunting Area	2,214	5,470
Don Hoi Lot	87,500	216,000
Had Chao Mai Marine National Park - Ta Libong Island Non-Hunting Area - Trang River Estuaries	66,313	163,860
Kaper Estuary - Laemson Marine National Park - Kraburi Estuary	122,046	301,580
Khao Sam Roi Yot Wetland	6,892	17,030
Ko Kra Archipelago	374	920
Ko Ra-Ko Phra Thong Archipelago	19,648	48,550
Krabi Estuary	21,299	52,630
Kuan Ki Sian of the Thale Noi Non-hunting Area Wetlands	494	1,220
Kut Ting Marshland	2,200	5,400
Lower Songkhram River	5,504.5	13,602
Mu Koh Ang Thong Marine National Park	10,200	25,000
Nong Bong Kai Non-Hunting Area	434	1,070
Phang Nga Bay Marine National Park	40,000	99,000
Princess Sirindhorn Wildlife Sanctuary	20,100	50,000
Royal Thai Army Nature Education Center (Bang Pu)	1,480.3	3,658

=== Turkmenistan ===
Name	Area (ha)	Area (acre)
Turkmenbashy Bay	267,124	660,080

=== United Arab Emirates ===
Name	Area (ha)	Area (acre)
Al Wathba Wetland Reserve	500	1,200
Al-Zora Protected Area	195	480
Bul Syayeef	14,505	35,840
Hatta Mountain Reserve	2,100	5,200
Jabal Ali Wetland Sanctuary	2,002	4,950
Mangrove and Alhafeya Protected Area in Khor Kalba	1,494	3,690
Ras Al Khor Wildlife Sanctuary	620	1,500
Sir Bu Nair Island Protected Area	4,964	12,270
Wadi Wurayah National Park	12,700	31,000
Wasit Nature Reserve	86	210

=== Uzbekistan ===
Name	Area (ha)	Area (acre)
Aydar-Arnasay Lakes system	527,100	1,302,000
Lake Dengizkul	31,300	77,000
Sudochye lake system	84,000	210,000
Tudakul and Kuymazar Water Reservoirs	32,000	79,000

=== Vietnam ===
Name	Area (ha)	Area (acre)
Ba Be National Park	10,048	24,830
Bau Sau Wetlands and Seasonal Floodplain	13,759	34,000
Con Dao National Park	19,991	49,400
Lang Sen Wetland Reserve	4,802	11,870
Mui Ca Mau National Park	41,862	103,440
Tram Chim National Park	7,313	18,070
U Minh Thuong National Park	8,038	19,860
Van Long Wetland Nature Reserve	2,736	6,760
Xuan Thuy Natural Wetland Reserve	12,000	30,000

=== Yemen ===
Name	Area (ha)	Area (acre)
Detwah Lagoon	580	1,400

== Europe ==
=== Albania ===
Name	Area (ha)	Area (acre)
Albanian Prespa Lakes	15,119	37,360
Butrint	13,500	33,000
Karavasta Lagoon	20,000	49,000
Lake Shkodra and River Buna	49,562	122,470

=== Andorra ===
Name	Area (ha)	Area (acre)
Parc naturel de la vallée de Sorteny	1,080	2,700
Parque Natural Comunal de los Valles del Comapedrosa	1,543	3,810
Vall de Madriu-Perafita-Claror	4,247	10,490

=== Armenia ===
Name	Area (ha)	Area (acre)
Khor Virap Marsh	50	120
Lake Arpi	3,230	8,000
Lake Sevan	490,231	1,211,390

=== Austria ===
Name	Area (ha)	Area (acre)
Autertal - St. Lorenzener Hochmoor	48	120
Bayerische Wildalm and Wildalmfilz	133	330
Donau-March-Thaya-Auen	36,090	89,200
Güssing Fishponds	148	370
Hörfeld-Moor	137	340
Lafnitztal	2,180	5,400
Lendspitz - Maiernigg	77.6	192
Mires of Pass Thurn	190	470
Mires of the Sauerfelder Wald	119	290
Mires of the Schwarzenberg	267	660
Mires of the Überling	265	650
Moor- und Seenlandschaft Keutschach-Schiefling	543	1,340
Moore am Nassköhr	211	520
Nationalpark Kalkalpen	18,532	45,790
Neusiedlersee, Seewinkel & Hanság	44,229	109,290
Peatlands in Styrian Salzkammergut	152.2	376
Pürgschachen Moor	62	150
Rheindelta	2,065	5,100
Rotmoos im Fuschertal	58	140
Sablatnigmoor	96	240
Stauseen am Unteren Inn	870	2,100
Transboundary Ramsar Site Podyjí – Thayatal National Park, Part Austria	1,358.5	3,357
Untere Lobau	915	2,260
Upper Drava River	1,029	2,540
Waldviertel ponds, peat bogs & floodplains	13,000	32,000
Wilder Kaiser	3,781	9,340

=== Azerbaijan ===
Name	Area (ha)	Area (acre)
Agh-Ghol	500	1,200
Ghizil-Agaj	99,060	244,800

=== Belarus ===
Name	Area (ha)	Area (acre)
Berezinsky Biosphere Reserve	85,149	210,410
Dikoe Fen Mire	23,145	57,190
Dnieper River Floodplain	29,352.94	72,532.7
Drozbitka-Svina	6,727.2	16,623
Duleby Islands-Zaozerye	30,772	76,040
Golubickaya Puscha	18,240	45,100
Iput River Floodplain	3,501.8	8,653
Kotra	10,584	26,150
Kozyansky	26,060	64,400
Mid-Pripyat State Landscape Zakaznik	90,447	223,500
Morochno	5,845	14,440
Olmany Mires Zakaznik	94,219	232,820
Osveiski	22,600	56,000
Podvelikiy Moh	10,647	26,310
Polesye Valley of River Bug	23,159	57,230
Pripyatsky National Park	88,553	218,820
Prostyr	9,500	23,000
Servech	9,068	22,410
Sporovsky Biological Reserve	19,384	47,900
Stary Zhaden	17,048	42,130
Svislochsko-Berezinskiy	18,341	45,320
Vigonoshchanskoe	54,182	133,890
Vileity	8,452	20,890
Vydritsa	21,292	52,610
Yelnia	23,200	57,000
Zvanets	15,873	39,220

=== Belgium ===
Name	Area (ha)	Area (acre)
De Ijzerbroeken te Diksmuide en Lo-Reninge	2,360	5,800
Grotte des Emotions	3	7.4
Kalmthoutse Heide	2,200	5,400
Les Hautes Fagnes	9,974	24,650
Marais d'Harchies	557.06	1,376.5
Schorren van de Beneden Schelde	420	1,000
Vallée de la Haute-Sûre	29,000	72,000
Vlaamse Banken	1,900	4,700
Zwin	530	1,300

=== Bosnia and Herzegovina ===
Name	Area (ha)	Area (acre)
Bardača Wetland	3,500	8,600
Hutovo Blato	7,411	18,310
Livanjsko Polje	45,868	113,340

=== Bulgaria ===
Name	Area (ha)	Area (acre)
Atanasovo Lake	1,404	3,470
Belene Islands Complex	18,330	45,300
Dragoman Marsh Karst Complex	14,967	36,980
Durankulak Lake	350	860
Ibisha Island	3,365	8,320
Lake Shabla	404	1,000
Poda	307	760
Pomorie Wetland Complex	922	2,280
Ropotamo Complex	5,500	14,000
Srébarna	1,463.75	3,617.0
Vaya Lake	2,900	7,200

=== Croatia ===
Name	Area (ha)	Area (acre)
Crna Mlaka Fishponds	756	1,870
Nature Park Lonjsko Polje	51,218	126,560
Nature Park Kopački rit	23,126.3	57,146
Neretva River Delta	12,742	31,490
Vransko Lake	5,748	14,200

=== Cyprus ===
Name	Area (ha)	Area (acre)
Larnaca Salt Lake	1,107	2,740
Limassol Salt Lake

=== Czech Republic ===
Name	Area (ha)	Area (acre)
Jizera Headwaters	2,303	5,690
Krkonošská rašeliniště	230	570
Krušnohorská rašeliniště	11,224	27,740
Lednické rybníky	650	1,600
Liběchovka and Pšovka Brooks	350	860
Litovelské Pomoraví	5,122	12,660
Mokřady dolního Podyjí	11,525	28,480
Novozámecký a Brehyňský rybník	923	2,280
Poodří	5,450	13,500
Pramenné vývěry a rašeliniště Slavkovského lesa	3,223	7,960
Punkva subterranean stream	1,571	3,880
Šumavská rašeliniště	6,371	15,740
Třeboňská rašeliniště	1,100	2,700
Třeboňské rybníky	10,165	25,120

=== Denmark ===
Name	Area (ha)	Area (acre)
Aqajarua	22,350	55,200
Eqalummiut Nunaat and Nassuttuup Nunaa	579,530	1,432,000
Ertholmene	1,266	3,130
Filso	4,270	10,600
Heden	252,390	623,700
Hirsholmene	3,714	9,180
Hochstetter Forland	184,820	456,700
Horsens Fjord & Endelave	42,737	105,610
Ikkattoq and adjacent archipelago	44,880	110,900
Karrebæk, Dybso and Avno Fjords	18,860	46,600
Kilen	51,280	126,700
Kitsissunnguit	6,910	17,100
Kitsissut Avalliit	4,470	11,000
Kuannersuit Kuussuat	5,190	12,800
Læso	66,548	164,440
Lille Vildmose	7,393	18,270
Lillebælt	35,189	86,950
Maribo Lakes	3,823	9,450
Mykines	2,300	5,700
Nærå Coast and Æbelo area	13,161	32,520
Nakskov Fjord and Inner Fjord	8,552	21,130
Naternaq	184,010	454,700
Nissum Bredning with Harboore and Agger Tange	12,786	31,590
Nissum Fjord	10,952	27,060
Nólsoy	2,197	5,430
Nordre Ronner	2,993	7,400
Ørsted Dal, Pingel Dal and Enhjørningen Dal	218,000	540,000
Præsto Fjord, Jungshoved Nor, Ulvshale and Nyord	24,778	61,230
Qínnquata Marraa and Kuussuaq	6,480	16,000
Randers and Mariager Fjords and the adjacent sea	39,190	96,800
Ringkobing Fjord	27,652	68,330
Sejro Bugt, Nekselo Bugt & Saltbæk Vig	44,111	109,000
Skuvoy	1,790	4,400
South Funen Archipelago	38,329	94,710
Stadil and Veststadil Fjords	6,932	17,130
Stavns Fjord and adjacent waters	15,533	38,380
Ulvedybet and Nibe Bredning	18,575	45,900
Vadehavet	151,080	373,300
Vejlerne and Logstor Bredning	43,534	107,570
Waters between Lolland and Falster including Rodsand, Guldborg sound, and Boto Nor	34,812	86,020
Waters north of Anholt	11,616	28,700
Waters South of Zealand, Skælskor Fjord, Glæno and adjacent wetlands	18,577	45,900
Waters southeast of Fejø and Femo Islands	41,826	103,350

=== Estonia ===
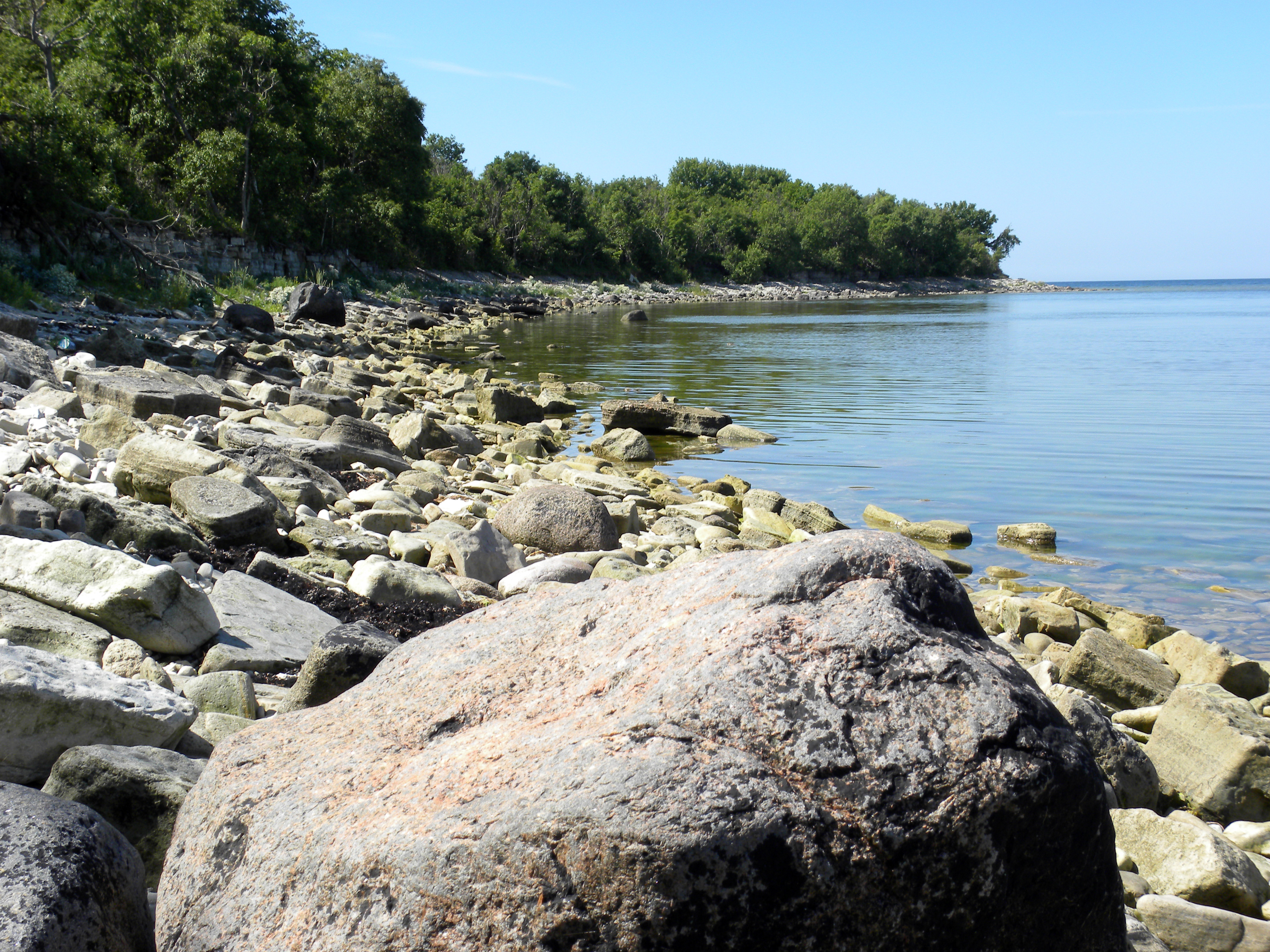
Vilsandi National Park in Estonia

Name	Area (ha)	Area (acre)
Agusalu	11,000	27,000
Alam-Pedja	34,220	84,600
Emajoe Suursoo Mire and Piirissaar Island	32,600	81,000
Endla	10,110	25,000
Haapsalu-Noarootsi Wetland Complex	27,450	67,800
Hiiumaa islets and Käina Bay	17,700	44,000
Laidevahe Nature Reserve	2,424	5,990
Leidissoo Nature Reserve	8,178	20,210
Lihula	6,620	16,400
Luitemaa	11,240	27,800
Matsalu Nature Reserve	48,610	120,100
Muraka	13,980	34,500
Nigula Nature Reserve	6,398	15,810
Puhto-Laelatu-Nehatu Wetland Complex	4,640	11,500
Sookuninga Nature Reserve	5,869	14,500
Soomaa	39,639	97,950
Vilsandi National Park	24,100	60,000

=== Finland ===
Name	Area (ha)	Area (acre)
Aspskär Islands	728	1,800
Bird Wetlands of Haapavesi	3,616	8,940
Bird Wetlands of Hailuoto Island	6,512	16,090
Bird Wetlands of Hanko and Tammisaari	55,196	136,390
Bird Wetlands of Lapväärtti	1,224	3,020
Bird Wetlands of Siikajoki	2,691	6,650
Bird Wetlands of Vanajavesi Area	702	1,730
Bird-lakes of Rääkkylä and Kitee	1,227	3,030
Bird-Lakes of Rantasalmi	1,109	2,740
Björkör and Lågskär Archipelago	6,309	15,590
Kainuunkylä Islands	1,005	2,480
Kauhaneva–Pohjankangas National Park	6,849	16,920
Kirkon-Vilkkiläntura Bay	194	480
Koitelainen Mires	48,938	120,930
Krunnit Islands	4,435	10,960
Lake Kirkkojärvi and Lupinlahti Bay	649	1,600
Lake Kirkkojärvi Area	305	750
Lake Kutajärvi Area	1,051	2,600
Lake Läppträsket	199	490
Lake Sysmäjärvi	734	1,810
Lakes Aittojärvi and Kongasjärvi	703	1,740
Lakes Heinä-Suvanto and Hetejärvi	1,224	3,020
Lätäseno-Hietajoki Mires	43,367	107,160
Lemmenjoki National Park	285,990	706,700
Levaneva Mires	3,343	8,260
Liminganlahti Bay Area	12,275	30,330
Martimoaapa - Lumiaapa - Penikat Mires	14,086	34,810
Olvassuo Mires	27,073	66,900
Oulanka National Park	29,390	72,600
Patvinsuo National Park	12,727	31,450
Pernajanlahti Bay	1,143	2,820
Pilvineva Mires	3,667	9,060
Porvoonjoki Estuary - Stensböle	958	2,370
Quark Archipelago	63,699	157,400
Riisitunturi National Park	12,461	30,790
River Luiro Mires	12,345	30,510
Salamajärvi National Park	9,261	22,880
Sammuttijänkä - Vaijoenjänkä Mires	51,749	127,870
Signilskär-Märket Archipelago	22,566	55,760
Siikalahti Bay Area	682	1,690
Söderskär and Långören Archipelago	18,219	45,020
Sotkavuoma Mires	2,602	6,430
Suurenaukeansuo - Isosuo Mires and Lake Pohjalampi	1,640	4,100
Teuravuoma - Kivijärvenvuoma Mires	5,788	14,300
Torronsuo National Park	3,093	7,640
Valkmusa National Park	1,710	4,200
Vanhankaupunginlahti, Laajalahti	508	1,260
Vassorfjärden Bay	1,537	3,800
Veneneva-Pelso Mires	12,039	29,750

=== France ===
Name	Area (ha)	Area (acre)
Baie d'Audierne	2,396	5,920
Baie de Somme	17,320	42,800
Baie du Mont Saint-Michel	62,000	150,000
Basse-Mana	59,000	150,000
Basses Vallees Angevines	6,450	15,900
Bassin d'Arcachon - Secteur du delta de l'Eyre	5,175	12,790
Camargue	85,000	210,000
Estuaire du fleuve Sinnamary	28,400	70,000
Étang de Biguglia	1,790	4,400
Étang de Palo	212	520
Étang de Saint-Paul	485	1,200
Étang de Salses-Leucate	7,637	18,870
Étang des Salines	207	510
Étang d'Urbino	790	2,000
Étangs de la Champagne humide	255,800	632,000
Étangs de la Petite Woëvre	5,300	13,000
Étangs du Lindre, forêt du Romersberg et zones voisines	5,308	13,120
Étangs palavasiens	5,797	14,320
Golfe du Morbihan	23,000	57,000
Grand Cul-de-Sac Marin de la Guadeloupe	29,500	73,000
Grande Briere	19,000	47,000
Ile d'Europa	205,800	509,000
Impluvium d'Evian	3,275	8,090
La Brenne	140,000	350,000
La Dombes	47,659	117,770
La Loire des confluences	17,978.8	44,427
La Petite Camargue	37,000	91,000
La Vasière des Badamiers	115	280
Lac de Grand-Lieu	6,300	16,000
Lac du Bourget - Marais de Chautagne	5,500	14,000
Le Pinail	923	2,280
Lagon de Moorea	5,000	12,000
Le Marais audomarois	3,726	9,210
Les étangs de Villepey	255	630
Les étangs littoraux de la Narbonnaise	12,334	30,480
Les Lacs du Grand Sud Neo-Caledonien	43,970	108,700
Marais Breton, Baie de Bourgneuf, Ile de Noirmoutier et Forêt de Monts	55,826	137,950
Marais d'Orx et zones humides associées	962	2,380
Marais de Kaw	137,000	340,000
Marais de Sacy	1,073	2,650
Marais du Cotentin et du Bessin, Baie des Veys	32,500	80,000
Marais du Fier d'Ars	4,452	11,000
Marais et tourbières des montagnes du Bugey	1,049.9	2,594
Marais et tourbières des vallées de la Somme et de l'Avre	13,100	32,000
Marais Poitevin	69,034	170,590
Marais salants de Guérande et du Més	5,200	13,000
Marais Vernier et Vallée de la Risle maritime	9,564.46	23,634.3
Mares temporaires de Tre Padule de Suartone	218	540
Réserve Naturelle Nationale des Terres Australes Francaises	2,270,000	5,600,000
Rhin Supérieur / Oberrhein	22,413	55,380
Rives du Lac Léman	1,915	4,730
Salins d'Hyères	900	2,200
Tourbière de Moltifao	33	82
Tourbière des Saisies — Beaufortain — Val d'Arly	292.6	723
Tourbières et lacs de la Montagne jurassienne	12,156	30,040
Vallées de la Scarpe et de l'Escaut	27,622	68,260
Zones humides et marines de Saint-Martin	2,997	7,410

=== Georgia ===
Name	Area (ha)	Area (acre)
Bugdasheni Lake	119.3	295
Ispani Mire	770	1,900
Madatapa Lake	1,398	3,450
Wetlands of Central Kolkheti	33,710	83,300

=== Germany ===
Name	Area (ha)	Area (acre)
Aland-Elbe-Niederung und Elbaue Jerichow	8,605	21,260
Ammersee	6,517	16,100
Bayerische Wildalm	7	17
Lake Constance: Wollmatinger Ried - Giehrenmoos & Mindelsee	1,286	3,180
Chiemsee	8,660	21,400
Diepholzer Moorniederung	15,060	37,200
Donauauen & Donaumoos	8,000	20,000
Dümmer	3,600	8,900
Elbauen, Schnackenburg-Lauenburg	7,560	18,700
Galenbecker See	1,015	2,510
Hamburgisches Wattenmeer	11,700	29,000
Helmestausee Berga-Kelbra	1,453	3,590
Ismaninger Speichersee & Fischteichen	955	2,360
Krakower Obersee	870	2,100
Lech-Donau-Winkel	4,014	9,920
Mühlenberger Loch	675	1,670
Niederelbe, Barnkrug-Otterndorf	11,760	29,100
Niederung der Unteren Havel/Gülper See/Schollener See	8,920	22,000
Oberrhein / Rhin Supérieur	25,117	62,070
Ostseeboddengewässer Westrügen-Hiddensee-Zingst	25,800	64,000
Ostufer Müritz	4,830	11,900
Peitzer Teichgebiet	1,060	2,600
Rheinauen zwischen Eltville und Bingen	566	1,400
Rieselfelder Münster	233	580
Rosenheim Basin Bogs	1,039.2	2,568
Schleswig-Holstein Wadden Sea and adjacent areas	454,988	1,124,300
Starnberger See	5,720	14,100
Steinhuder Meer	5,730	14,200
Unterer Inn, Haiming-Neuhaus	1,955	4,830
Unterer Niederrhein	25,000	62,000
Unteres Odertal, Schwedt	5,400	13,000
Wattenmeer, Elbe-Weser-Dreieck	38,460	95,000
Wattenmeer, Jadebusen & westliche Wesermündung	49,490	122,300
Wattenmeer, Ostfriesisches Wattenmeer & Dollart	121,620	300,500
Weserstaustufe Schlüsselburg	1,600	4,000

=== Greece ===
Name	Area (ha)	Area (acre)
Amvrakikos Gulf	23,649	58,440
Artificial Lake Kerkini	10,996	27,170
Axios, Loudias, Aliakmon Delta	11,808	29,180
Evros Delta	9,267	22,900
Kotychi lagoons	6,302	15,570
Lake Mikri Prespa	5,078	12,550
Lake Vistonis, Porto Lagos, Lake Ismaris & adjoining lagoons	24,396	60,280
Lakes Volvi & Koronia	16,388	40,500
Messolonghi lagoons	33,687	83,240
Nestos delta & adjoining lagoons	21,930	54,200

=== Hungary ===
Name	Area (ha)	Area (acre)
Baradla Cave System and related wetlands	2,056	5,080
Béda-Karapancsa	8,668.9	21,421
Biharugra Fishponds	2,791	6,900
Bodrogzug	4,220	10,400
Borsodi-Mezöség	18,470.9	45,643
Csongrád-Bokrosi Sóstó sodic-alkaline pans	865	2,140
Fishponds and Marshlands south of Lake Balaton	9,483	23,430
Gemenc	19,770	48,900
Hortobágy	32,037	79,170
Ipoly Valley	2,303.7	5,693
Kis-Balaton	14,659	36,220
Lake Balaton	59,800	148,000
Lake Fehér at Kardoskút	492	1,220
Lake Fertö	8,432	20,840
Lake Kolon at Izsák	3,059	7,560
Lakes by Tata	1,897	4,690
Mártély	2,324	5,740
Montág-puszta	2,203	5,440
Nyirkai-Hany	419	1,040
Ócsai Turjános	1,145.8	2,831
Pacsmag Fishponds Nature Conservation Area	439.4	1,086
Pusztaszer	5,000	12,000
Rába valley	9,552.3	23,604
Rétszilas Fishponds Nature Conservation Area	1,494	3,690
Szaporca	289.5	715
Upper Kiskunság Alkaline Lakes	7,393.8	18,270
Upper Kiskunság alkaline steppes	13,177	32,560
Upper Tisza (Felsö-Tisza)	26,871	66,400
Velence and Dinnyés Nature Conservation Area	1,354.5	3,347

=== Iceland ===
Name	Area (ha)	Area (acre)
Andakíll Protected Habitat Area	3,086	7,630
Grunnafjörður	1,470	3,600
Guðlaugstungur Nature Reserve	40,160	99,200
Mývatn-Laxá region	20,000	49,000
Snæfell and Eyjabakkar Area	26,450	65,400
Þjórsárver	37,500	93,000

=== Ireland ===
Name	Area (ha)	Area (acre)
Baldoyle Bay	203	500
Ballyallia Lough	308	760
Ballycotton Bay	92	230
Ballymacoda	375	930
Bannow Bay	958	2,370
Blacksod Bay and Broadhaven	683	1,690
Blackwater Estuary	468	1,160
Castlemaine Harbour	2,973	7,350
Clara Bog	460	1,100
Coole Lough & Garryland Wood	364	900
Cork Harbour	1,436	3,550
Cummeen Strand	1,491	3,680
Dundalk Bay	4,768	11,780
Dungarvan Harbour	1,041	2,570
Easky Bog	607	1,500
The Gearagh	307	760
Inner Galway Bay	11,905	29,420
Killala Bay/Moy Estuary	1,061	2,620
Knockmoyle/Sheskin	1,198	2,960
Lough Barra Bog	176	430
Lough Corrib	17,728	43,810
Lough Derravaragh	1,120	2,800
Lough Ennell	1,404	3,470
Lough Gara	1,742	4,300
Lough Glen	81	200
Lough Iron	182	450
Lough Oughter	1,464	3,620
Lough Owel	1,032	2,550
Meenachullion Bog	194	480
Mongan Bog	127	310
North Bull Island	1,436	3,550
Owenboy	397	980
Owenduff catchment	1,382	3,410
Pettigo Plateau	900	2,200
Pollardstown Fen	130	320
Raheenmore Bog	162	400
Raven, The	589	1,460
Rogerstown Estuary	195	480
Sandymount Strand/Tolka Estuary	654	1,620
Slieve Bloom Mountains	2,230	5,500
The Broadmeadow Estuary	546	1,350
Tralee Bay	861	2,130
Tramore Backstrand	367	910
Trawbreaga Bay	1,003	2,480
Wexford Wildfowl Reserve	194	480

=== Italy ===
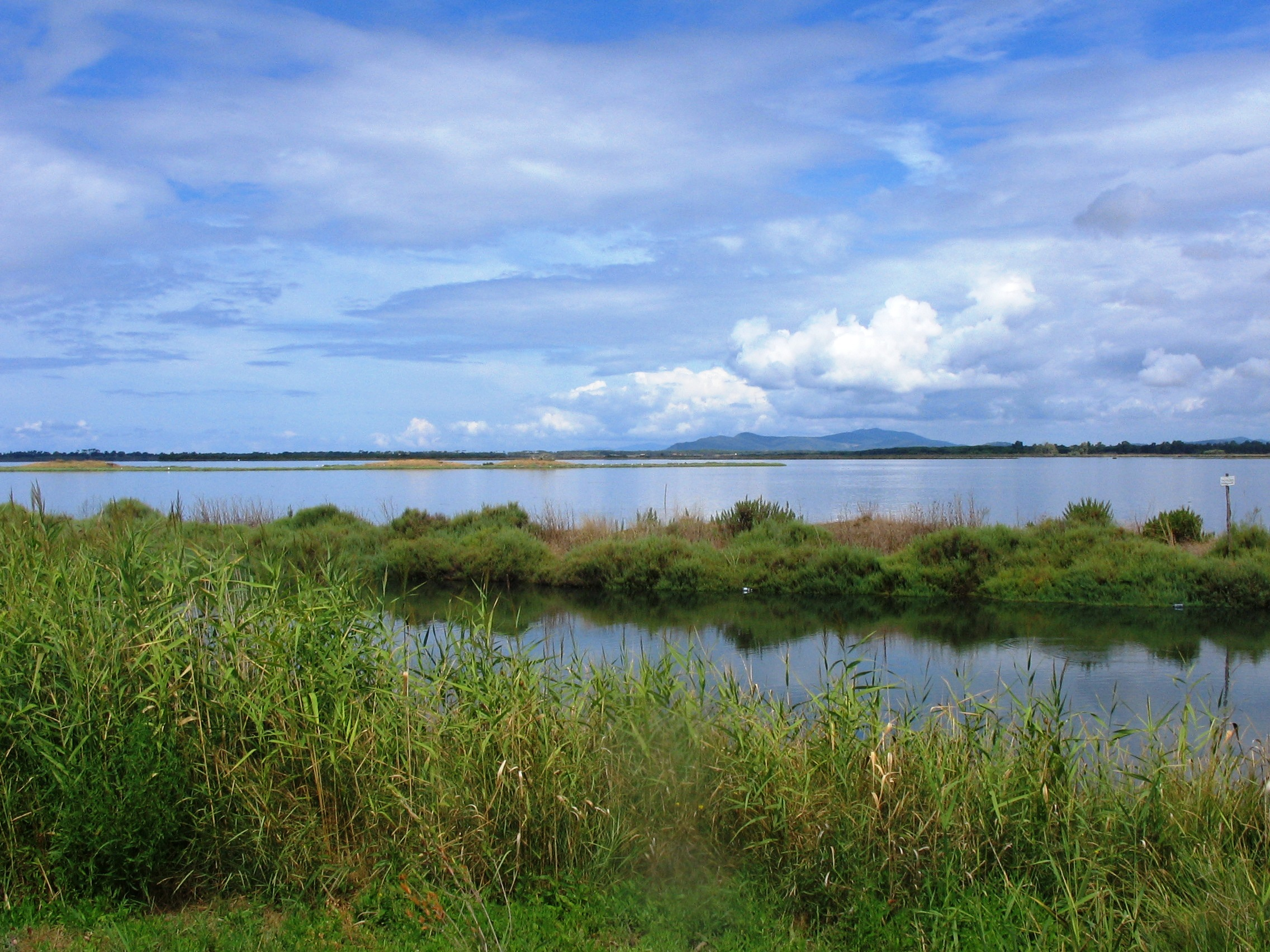
Laguna di Orbetello in Italy

Name	Area (ha)	Area (acre)
Bacino dell'Angitola	875	2,160
Biviere di Gela	256	630
Busatello marsh	443	1,090
Ex Lago e Padule di Bientina	1,784.0	4,408
Foce dell'Isonzo – Isola della Cona	2,340.0	5,782
Isola Boscone	201	500
Lago dei Monaci	94	230
Lago di Barrea	303	750
Lago di Burano	410	1,000
Lago di Caprolace	229	570
Lago di Fogliano	395	980
Lago di Nazzano	265	650
Lago di Sabaudia	1,474	3,640
Lago di San Giuliano	2,118	5,230
Lago di Sibolla	128.0	316
Lago di Tovel	37	91
Laguna di Marano: Foci dello Stella	1,400	3,500
Laguna di Orbetello	887	2,190
Laguna di Venezia: Valle Averto	500	1,200
Lagustelli di Percile	256	630
Le Cesine	620	1,500
Massaciuccoli lake and marsh	11,135	27,520
Oasi del Sele-Serre Persano	174	430
Oasi di Castelvolturno o Variconi	195	480
Ortazzo e Ortazzino	440	1,100
Padule della Trappola — Foce dell'Ombrone	536	1,320
Padule di Fucecchio	2,500	6,200
Padule di Scarlino	206	510
Padule Orti-Bottagone	151.0	373
Palude Brabbia	459	1,130
Palude del Brusà Le Vallette	171	420
Palude della Diaccia Botrona	2,500	6,200
Palude di Bolgheri	518	1,280
Palude di Colfiorito	157	390
Palude di Ostiglia	123	300
Pantano di Pignola	172	430
Piallassa della Baiona e Risega	1,630	4,000
Pian di Spagna - Lago di Mezzola	1,740	4,300
Posada River Mouth	736	1,820
Punte Alberete	480	1,200
Sacca di Bellocchio	223	550
Saline di Cervia	785	1,940
Saline di Margherita di Savoia	3,871	9,570
Stagno di Cábras	3,575	8,830
Stagno di Cagliari	3,466	8,560
Stagno di Corru S'Ittiri, Stagni di San Giovanni e Marceddì	2,610	6,400
Stagno di Mistras	680	1,700
Stagno di Molentargius	1,401	3,460
Stagno di Pauli Maiori	287	710
Stagno di Sale Porcus	330	820
Stagno di S'Ena Arrubia	223	550
Torbiere d'Iseo	325	800
Torre Guaceto	940	2,300
Trapani and Paceco salt ponds	971	2,400
Valle Bertuzzi	3,100	7,700
Valle Campotto e Bassarone	1,363	3,370
Valle Cavanata	243	600
Valle di Gorino	1,330	3,300
Valle Santa [it]	261	640
Valli del Mincio	1,082	2,670
Valli residue del comprensorio di Comacchio	13,500	33,000
Vendicari	1,450	3,600
Vincheto di Cellarda	99	240

=== Latvia ===
Name	Area (ha)	Area (acre)
Lake Engure	19,700	49,000
Lake Kanieris	1,995	4,930
Lubana wetland complex	48,020	118,700
Northern Bogs	5,318	13,140
Pape Wetland Complex	51,725	127,820
Teiči and Pelecare bogs	23,560	58,200

=== Liechtenstein ===
Name	Area (ha)	Area (acre)
Ruggeller Riet	101	250

=== Lithuania ===
Name	Area (ha)	Area (acre)
Adutiskis-Svyla-Birveta wetland complex	6,881	17,000
Cepkeliai	11,227	27,740
Girutiskis bog	1,402	3,460
Kamanos	6,401	15,820
Nemunas Delta	28,952	71,540
Viesvilé	3,218	7,950
Zuvintas	7,500	19,000

=== Luxembourg ===
Name	Area (ha)	Area (acre)
Haff Réimech	313	770
Vallée de la Haute-Sûre	16,900	42,000

=== Malta ===
Name	Area (ha)	Area (acre)
Għadira	11	27
Is-Simar	5	12

=== Moldova ===
Name	Area (ha)	Area (acre)
Lower Dniester	60,000	150,000
Lower Prut Lakes	19,152	47,330
Unguri-Holosnita	15,553	38,430

=== Monaco ===
Name	Area (ha)	Area (acre)
Réserve sous-marine du Larvotto	23	57

=== Montenegro ===
Name	Area (ha)	Area (acre)
Skadarsko Jezero	20,000	49,000
Tivat Saline	150	370
Ulcinj Salina	1,477	3,650

=== Netherlands ===
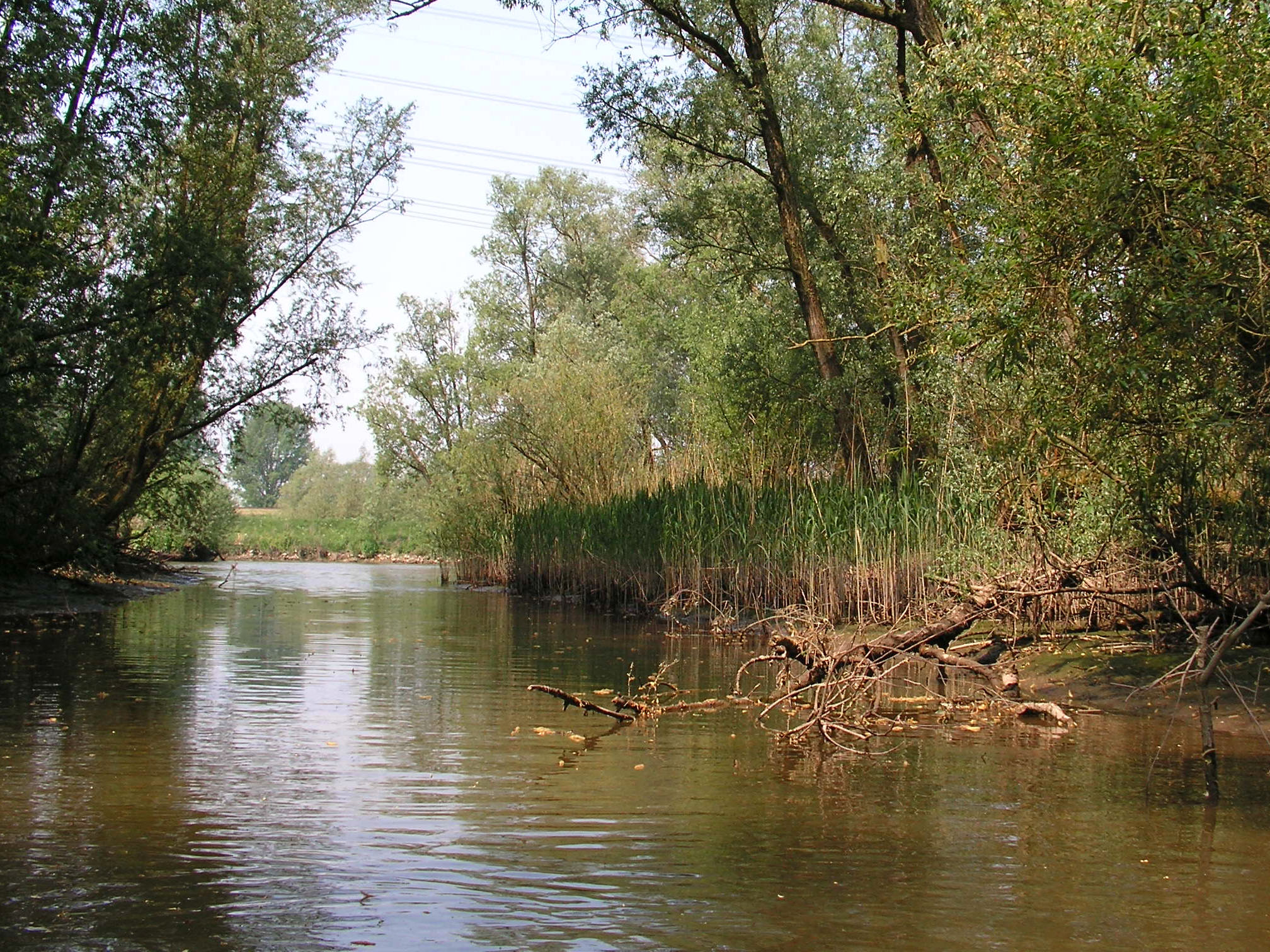
De Biesbosch in the Netherlands

Name	Area (ha)	Area (acre)
Alde Feanen	2,124	5,250
Bargerveen	2,082	5,140
Biesbosch	9,640	23,800
Broekvelden/Vettenbroek	700	1,700
Deelen	514	1,270
Deurnsche Peel & Mariapeel	2,734	6,760
Duinen Ameland	2,054.5	5,077
Duinen en Lage Land Texel	4,088.8	10,104
Duinen Schiermonnikoog	833.1	2,059
Duinen Terschelling	4,040.3	9,984
Duinen Vlieland	1,484.1	3,667
East Point	7,597	18,770
Engbertsdijksvenen	998	2,470
Grevelingen	13,753	33,980
Groote Peel	1,348	3,330
Haringvliet	10,880	26,900
Het Pekelmeer	400	990
Het Spaans Lagoen	259	640
Hollands Diep	4,139	10,230
IJsselmeer	113,341	280,070
Ketelmeer en Vossemeer	3,900	9,600
Klein Bonaire	1,295	3,200
Klein Curaçao	248.5	614
Krammer-Volkerak	6,159	15,220
Lac Baai	1,550	3,800
Lauwersmeer	5,754	14,220
Leekstermeergebied	1,543	3,810
Malpais/Sint Michiel	1,100	2,700
Markermeer & IJmeer	68,463.4	169,177
Markiezaat	1,831.9	4,527
Muizenberg	65	160
Mullet Pond	26.4	65
Naardermeer	1,151	2,840
North Sea Coastal Area	144,474.8	357,005
Northwest Curaçao	2,441	6,030
Oostelijke Vechtplassen	4,500	11,000
Oosterschelde	36,978	91,370
Oostvaardersplassen	5,477	13,530
Oudegaasterbrekken, Fluessen en omgeving	3,053.9	7,546
Pekelmeer	1,612	3,980
Rif Sint Marie	668	1,650
Rottige Meenthe en Brandemeer	1,369	3,380
Sneekermeergebied	2,300	5,700
South Coast	3,975	9,820
Veerse Meer	2,539	6,270
Veluwerandmeren	6,123.5	15,131
Voordelta	92,271	228,010
Voornes Duin	1,432	3,540
Wadden Sea	271,023.3	669,713
Washington Slagbaai	5,853	14,460
Weerribben	3,329	8,230
West Point	2,185	5,400
Western Wetlands	392	970
Westerschelde & Saeftinghe	43,647	107,850
Wieden	9,400	23,000
Zoommeer	1,175	2,900
Zuidlaardermeergebied	2,100	5,200
Zwanenwater en Pettemerduinen	770.3	1,903
Zwarte Meer	2,162	5,340

=== North Macedonia ===
Name	Area (ha)	Area (acre)
Dojran Lake	2,696	6,660
Lake Ohrid	25,205	62,280
Lake Prespa	18,920	46,800

=== Norway ===
Name	Area (ha)	Area (acre)
Åkersvika	428.1	1,058
Anda	52.5	130
Atnsjømyrene	533	1,320
Balsfjord Wetland System	1,795	4,440
Bear Island	298,171	736,800
Bliksvær	4,316	10,670
Dokkadelta	375	930
Dunoyane	1,191	2,940
Evenes wetland system	434	1,070
Fiskumvannet Nature Reserve	119	290
Fokstumyra	1,799	4,450
Forlandsoyane	540	1,300
Froan Nature Reserve and Landscape Protection Area	49,097	121,320
Gåsøyane	236	580
Giske Wetlands System	553.3	1,367
Glomådeltaet	594	1,470
Grunnfjorden	1,472	3,640
Haroya Wetlands System	190	470
Havmyran	3,872	9,570
Hedmarksvidda Wetland System	4,742	11,720
Hopen	318,567	787,200
Horsvaer	17,036	42,100
Horta	3,158	7,800
Hynna	6,442	15,920
Ilene and Presterodkilen Wetland System	216	530
Innherred Freshwater System	182	450
Isoyane	230	570
Jaeren wetland system	3,085	7,620
Karlsoyvaer	4,936	12,200
Kongsfjorden	710	1,800
Kurefjorden	392	970
Kvisleflået	5,682	14,040
Laukvikoyene	1,084	2,680
Lista Wetlands System	1,173	2,900
Lovund-Lundeura	153	380
Målselvutløpet	1,287.5	3,181
Mastadfjellet	802	1,980
Mellandsvågen	96	240
Mosvasstangen Landscape Protection Area	1,440.9	3,561
Nordenskiöldkysten	42,992	106,240
Nordre Oyeren	6,440.7	15,915
Nordre Tyrifjord Wetlands System	322	800
Ora	1,676	4,140
Orland Wetland System	3,168	7,830
Ovre Forra	10,254	25,340
Pasvik Nature Reserve	1,910	4,700
Reisautløpet	600	1,500
Risøysundet	504	1,250
Røstøyan	6,986.4	17,264
Rott-Håstein-Kjør	10,721.8	26,494
Runde	351	870
Sandblåst-/Gaustadvågen Nature Reserve	245.3	606
Sklinna	589	1,460
Skogvoll	5,544	13,700
Slettnes	1,230	3,000
Sørkapp	55,203	136,410
Stabbursneset	1,568	3,870
Tanamunningen	3,409	8,420
Tautra & Svaet	1,635	4,040
Trondheim Fjord wetland system	1,846	4,560
Tufsingdeltaet	895	2,210
Ulendeltaet	269.9	667
West-Vikna Archipelago	13,592	33,590

=== Poland ===
Name	Area (ha)	Area (acre)
Biebrzański National Park	59,233	146,370
Czerwone bog woodland - nature reserve	114.7	283
Druzno Lake Nature Reserve	3,068	7,580
Glacial lakes in the Tatra National Park	571.1	1,411
Karaś Lake Nature Reserve	815	2,010
Lake of Seven Islands Nature Reserve	1,618	4,000
Luknajno Lake Nature Reserve	1,189	2,940
Milicz Fishponds Nature Reserve	5,324	13,160
Narew River National Park	7,350	18,200
Peat bogs in the Tatra National Park	741	1,830
Peatland of the Izera River Valley	529.4	1,308
Poleski National Park	9,762	24,120
Przemków Fish Ponds	4,605.4	11,380
Słowiński National Park	32,744	80,910
Subalpine peatbogs in Karkonosze Mountains	40	99
Swidwie Lake Nature Reserve	891	2,200
Vistula River Mouth	1,748.1	4,320
Warta River Mouth National Park	7,956	19,660
Wigry National Park	15,085	37,280

=== Portugal ===
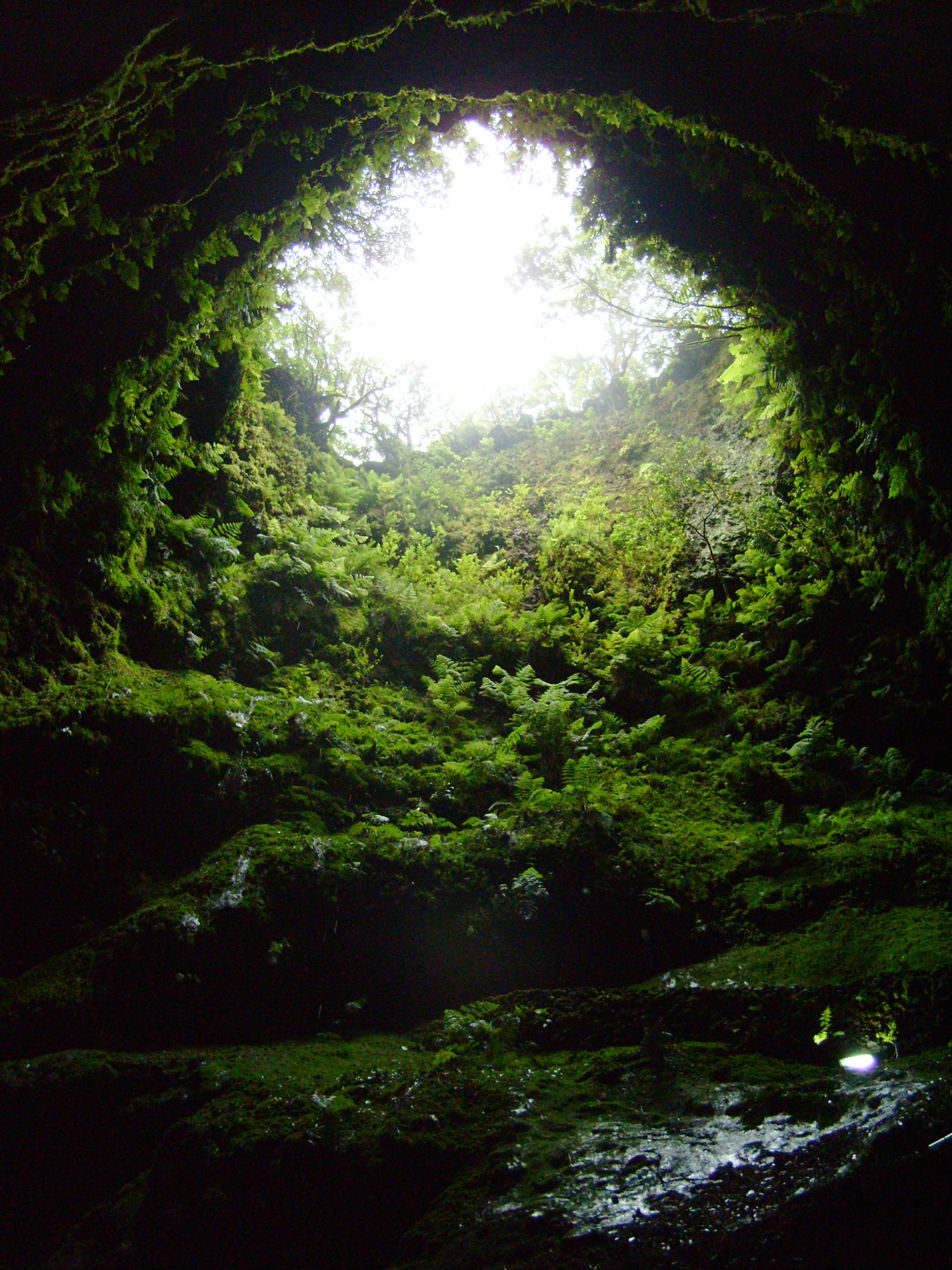
Algar do Carvão in the Azores

Name	Area (ha)	Area (acre)
Bertiandos and S. Pedro of Arcos Lagoons	346	850
Caldeira da Graciosa	120	300
Caldeira do Faial	312	770
Caldeirão do Corvo	316	780
Complexo Vulcânico das Furnas	2,855	7,050
Complexo Vulcânico das Sete Cidades	2,171	5,360
Complexo Vulcânico do Fogo	2,182	5,390
Estrela Mountain upper Plateau and upper Zêzere River	5,075	12,540
Estuário do Sado	25,588	63,230
Estuário do Tejo	14,563	35,990
'Fajãs' of Caldeira and Cubres Lagoons	87	210
Ilhéus das Formigas e Recife Dollabarat	7	17
Lagoa da Albufeira	1,995	4,930
Lagoa de St. André et Lagoa de Sancha	2,638	6,520
Mira Minde Polje and related Springs	662	1,640
Mondego Estuary	1,518	3,750
Óbidos Lagoon	1,040.0	2,570
Pateira de Fermentelos Lake and Águeda and Cértima Valleys	1,559	3,850
Paúl de Arzila	585	1,450
Paúl de Madriz	226	560
Paúl de Tornada	50	120
Paúl do Boquilobo	529	1,310
Paúl do Taipal	233	580
Planalto Central da Terceira	1,283	3,170
Planalto Central das Flores	2,572	6,360
Planalto Central de São Jorge	231	570
Planalto Central do Pico	748	1,850
Praia da Vitória Marsh	16	40
Ria de Alvor	1,454	3,590
Ria Formosa	16,000	40,000
Sapais de Castro Marim	2,235	5,520
Vascão River	44,331	109,540

=== Romania ===
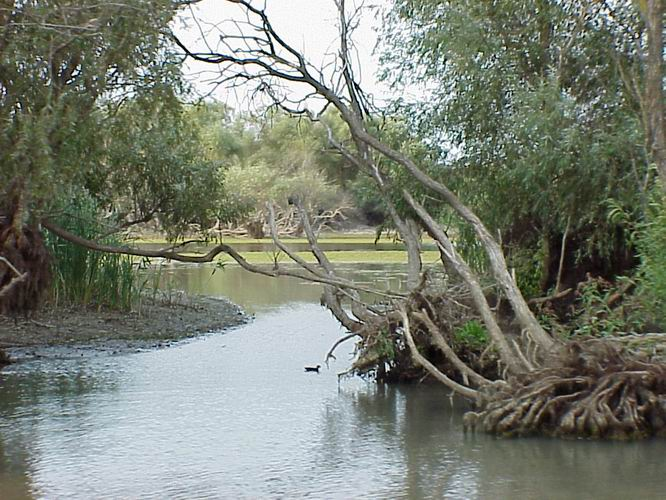
The Danube Delta in Romania

Name	Area (ha)	Area (acre)
Bistreț	27,482	67,910
Blahnița	45,286	111,900
Borcea Arm	21,529	53,200
Calafat-Ciuperceni-Danube	29,206	72,170
Canaralele de la Harsova	7,406	18,300
Comana Natural Park	24,963	61,680
Danube Delta	647,000	1,600,000
Danube Islands Bugeac-Iotormac	82,832	204,680
Dumbrăvița Fishpond Complex	2,282	5,640
Iron Gates Natural Park	115,666	285,820
Jijia-Iasi Wetlands	19,432.5	48,019
Jiu-Danube Confluence	19,800	49,000
Lake Calarasi	5,001	12,360
Lake Techirghiol	1,462	3,610
Mures Floodplain	17,166	42,420
Old Danube-Macin Arm	26,792	66,200
Olt-Danube Confluence	46,623	115,210
Poiana Stampei Peat Bog	640	1,600
Small Island of Braila	17,586	43,460
Suhaia	19,594	48,420

=== Serbia ===
Name	Area (ha)	Area (acre)
Djerdap	66,525.2	164,387
Gornje Podunavlje	22,480	55,500
Koviljsko-Petrovaradinski Rit	8,292	20,490
Labudovo okno	3,733	9,220
Ludasko Lake	593	1,470
Obedska Bara	17,501	43,250
Pestersko polje	3,455	8,540
Slano Kopovo	976	2,410
Stari Begej - Carska Bara Special Nature Reserve	1,767	4,370
Vlasina	3,209	7,930
Zasavica	1,913	4,730

=== Slovakia ===
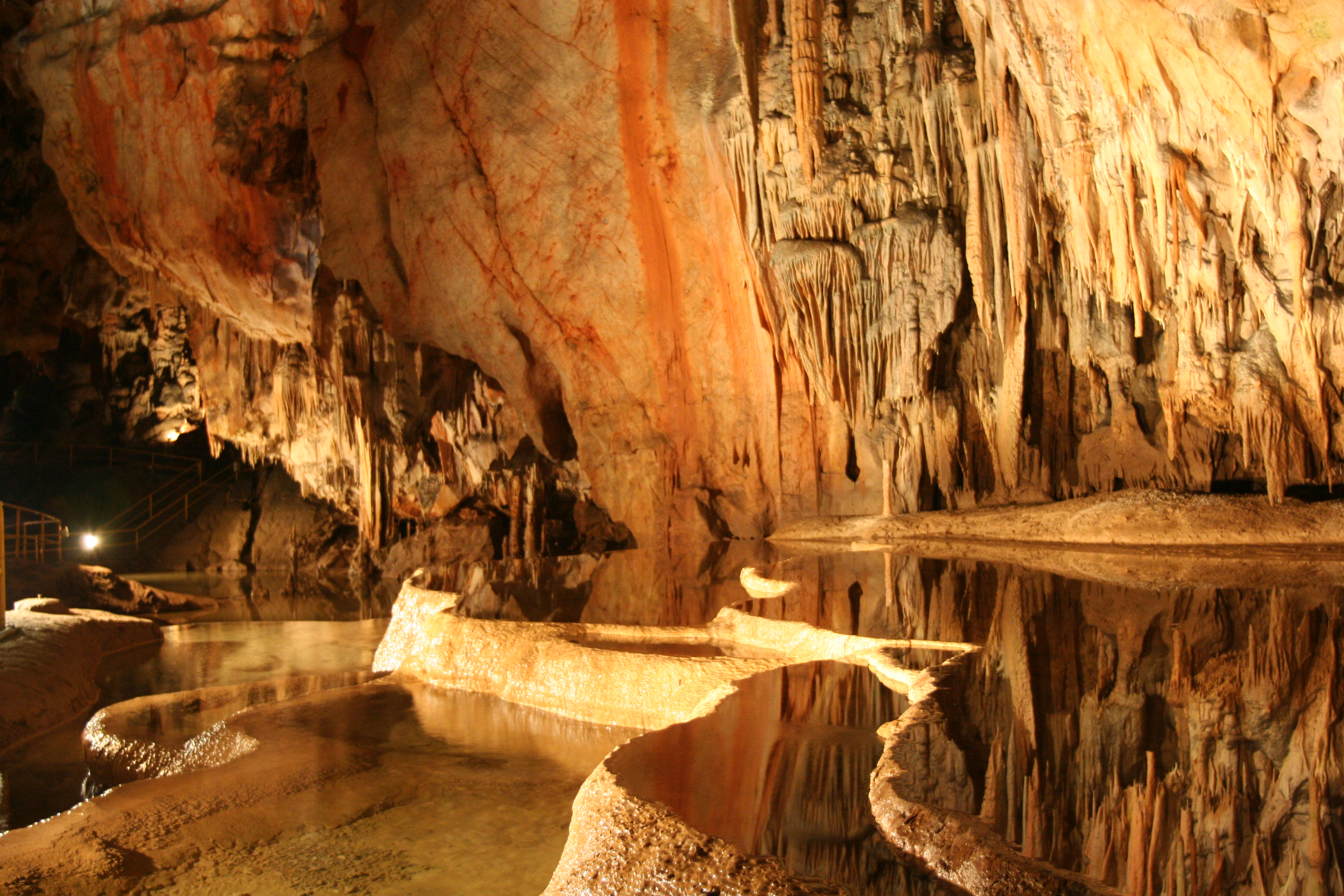
Domica cave in Slovakia

Name	Area (ha)	Area (acre)
Caves of the Demanova Valley	1,448	3,580
Domica	622	1,540
Dunajské luhy	14,488	35,800
Latorica	4,405	10,880
Moravské luhy	5,380	13,300
Orava River and its Tributaries	865	2,140
Parížske močiare	184	450
Poiplie	411	1,020
Rudava River Valley	560	1,400
Senné fishponds	425	1,050
Súr	1,137	2,810
Tisa River	735	1,820
Turiec wetlands	750	1,900
Wetlands of Orava Basin	9,287	22,950

=== Slovenia ===
Name	Area (ha)	Area (acre)
Cerkniško jezero z okolico	7,250	17,900
Sečoveljske soline	650	1,600
Škocjanske jame	305	750

=== Spain ===
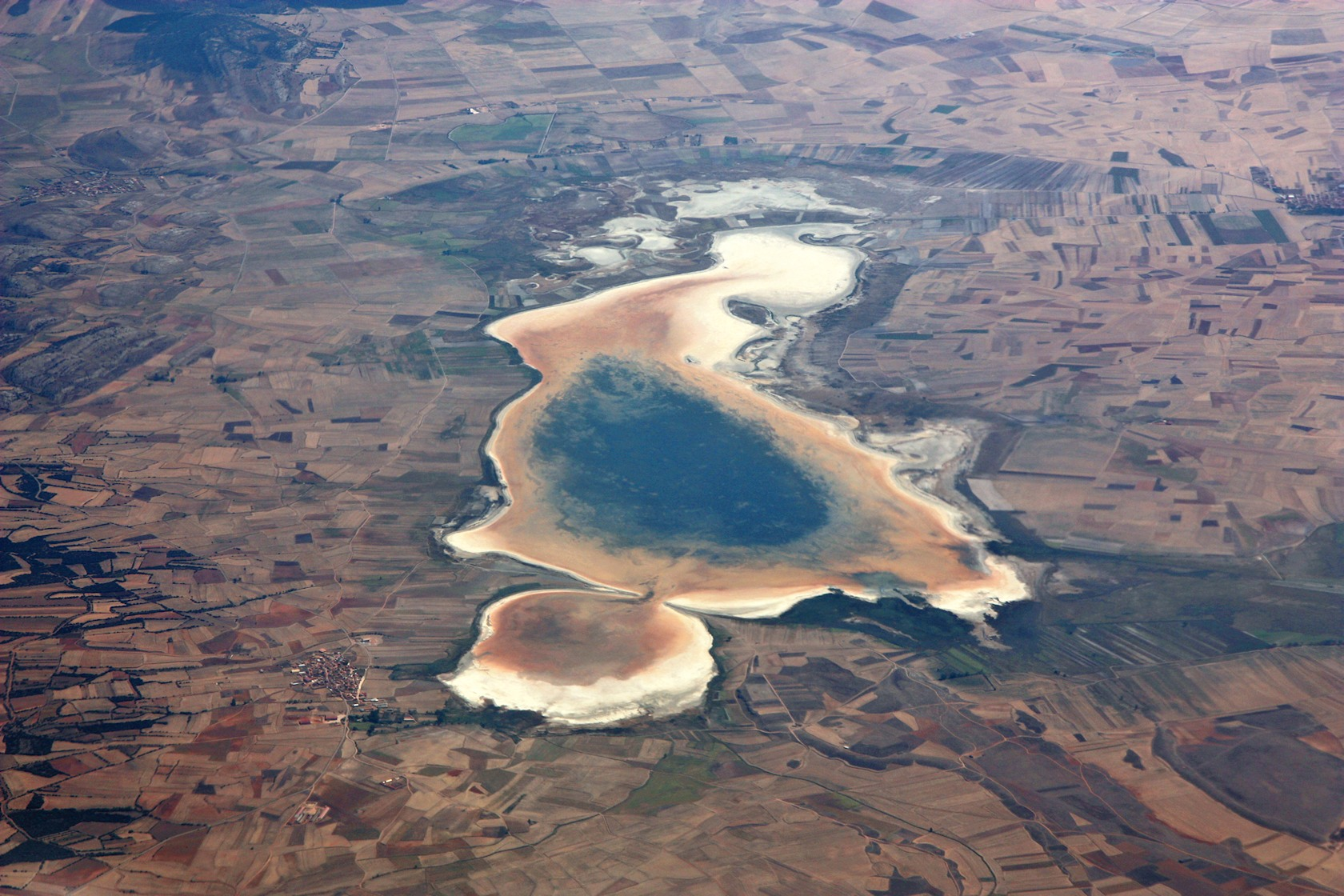
Laguna de Gallocanta, Spain

Name	Area (ha)	Area (acre)
Aiguamolls de l'Empordà	4,784	11,820
Albufera de Adra	75	190
Albufera de Valencia	21,000	52,000
Bahía de Cádiz	10,000	25,000
Colas del Embalse de Ullibarri	397	980
Complejo de Corrubedo	550	1,400
Complejo intermareal Umia-Grove	2,561	6,330
Complejo lagunar de La Albuera	1,878	4,640
Delta del Ebro	7,736	19,120
Doñana	111,646	275,880
Embalse de las Cañas	101	250
Embalse de Orellana	5,500	14,000
Embalses de Cordobilla y Malpasillo	1,972	4,870
Humedales de la Sierra de Urbión	86	210
Humedales del Macizo de Peñalara	487	1,200
Humedales y Turberas de Padul	327	810
Lago de Banyoles	1,033	2,550
Lago de Caicedo-Yuso y Salinas de Añana	26	64
Laguna de Chiprana	162	400
Laguna de El Hito	573	1,420
Laguna de Fuente de Piedra	1,364	3,370
Laguna de Gallocanta	6,720	16,600
Laguna de la Nava de Fuentes	326	810
Laguna de la Vega	34	84
Laguna de Manjavacas	231	570
Laguna de Pitillas	216	530
Laguna del Prado	52	130
Laguna y arenal de Valdoviño	485	1,200
Lagunas de Alcázar de San Juan	240	590
Lagunas de Cádiz	158	390
Lagunas de Campotejar	61	150
Lagunas de la Mata y Torrevieja	3,693	9,130
Lagunas de Laguardia	45	110
Lagunas de las Moreras	73	180
Lagunas de Puebla de Beleña	191	470
Lagunas de Ruidera	6,639	16,410
Lagunas de Villafáfila	2,714	6,710
Lagunas del sur de Córdoba	86	210
Las Tablas de Daimiel	1,928	4,760
Mar Menor	14,933	36,900
Marjal de Almenara	1,473.9	3,642
Marismas de Santoña	6,907	17,070
Marismas del Odiel	7,185	17,750
Marjal de Pego-Oliva	1,290	3,200
Pantano de El Hondo	2,387	5,900
Paraje Natural Brazo del Este	1,362	3,370
Paraje Natural Laguna Grande	200	490
Paraje Natural Lagunas de Palos y las Madres	635	1,570
Paraje Natural Punta Entinas-Sabinar	1,948	4,810
Parque Nacional de Aigüestortes i Estany de Sant Maurici	39,979	98,790
Parque Nacional Marítimo-Terrestre de las Islas Atlánticas de Galicia	8,542.6	21,109
Prat de Cabanes - Torreblanca	812	2,010
Reserva Natural Complejo Endorreico de Chiclana	793	1,960
Reserva Natural Complejo Endorreico de Espera	514	1,270
Reserva Natural Complejo Endorreico de Puerto Real	863	2,130
Reserva Natural Complejo Endorreico Lebrija-Las Cabezas	897	2,220
Reserva Natural Laguna de los Jarales	147	360
Reserva Natural Laguna de Tíscar	185	460
Reserva Natural Laguna del Chinche	221	550
Reserva Natural Laguna del Conde o El Salobral	345	850
Reserva Natural Laguna Honda	368	910
Reserva Natural Lagunas de Archidona	204	500
Reserva Natural Lagunas de Campillos	1,342	3,320
Ria de Mundaka-Guernika	945	2,340
Ría de Villaviciosa	1,263	3,120
Ría del Eo	1,740	4,300
Rias de Ortigueira y Ladrido	2,920	7,200
Saladar de Jandía	127	310
Saladas de Sástago-Bujaraloz	8,145	20,130
S'Albufera de Mallorca	1,700	4,200
Salburua	174	430
Salinas de Ibiza y Formentera	1,640	4,100
Salinas de Santa Pola	2,496	6,170
Salinas del Cabo de Gata	300	740
Tremedales de Orihuela	1,845	4,560
Txingudi	128	320

=== Sweden ===
Name	Area (ha)	Area (acre)
Aloppkölen-Köpmankölen	20,079	49,620
Asköviken-Sörfjärden	12,251	30,270
Blaikfjället	43,487	107,460
Blekinge archipelago	12,958	32,020
Dalälven-Färnebofjärden	16,866	41,680
Dättern	3,990	9,900
Dumme mosse	3,098	7,660
Emån	1,527	3,770
Falsterbo – (Bay of) Foteviken	7,851.4	19,401
Fylleån	805.6	1,991
Gammelstadsviken	440	1,100
Getapulien-Grönbo	3,229	7,980
Getterön	449.9	1,112
Gotland, east coast	4,963.8	12,266
Gullhög-Tönningfloarna	1,881	4,650
Gustavsmurarna-Tröskens rikkärr	660.2	1,631
Helgeån	8,042	19,870
Hjälstaviken	808	2,000
Hornborgasjön	6,197	15,310
Hovran area	4,858	12,000
Kallgate-Hejnum	1,647	4,070
Kilsviken	9,046	22,350
Klingavälsån-Krankesjön	3,989	9,860
Komosse	4,288	10,600
Koppången	4,936	12,200
Kvismaren	837	2,070
Laidaure	4,316	10,670
Lake Ånnsjön	11,031	27,260
Lake Åsnen	17,866	44,150
Lake Östen	1,486	3,670
Lake Persöfjärden	3,452	8,530
Lundåkra Bay	2,148	5,310
Mannavuoma	704	1,740
Mellanljusnan	1,711.4	4,229
Mellerstön	290	720
Mörrumsån-Pukavik Bay	2,557	6,320
Mossaträsk-Stormyran	914	2,260
Nittälven	1,940	4,800
Nordre älv estuary	7,226	17,860
Öland, eastern coastal areas	10,718	26,480
Oldflån-Flån	10,590	26,200
Oset-Rynningeviken	646	1,600
Ottenby	1,856	4,590
Päivävuoma	2,759	6,820
Pirttimysvuoma	2,586	6,390
Rappomyran	3,031	7,490
Sikåsvågarna	2,305	5,700
Sjaunja	181,333	448,080
Skälderviken	1,463	3,620
Södra Bråviken	3,610	8,900
Stigfjorden	7,326	18,100
Store Mosse and Kävsjön	7,797	19,270
Storkölen	6,992	17,280
Sulsjön-Sulån	350	860
Svartån	1,977	4,890
Svenska Högarna-Nassa	15,210	37,600
Tåkern	5,421	13,400
Tärnasjön	23,236	57,420
Tavvavuoma	28,920	71,500
Tjålmejaure-Laisdalen Valley	21,602	53,380
Tönnersjöheden-Årshultsmyren	12,388	30,610
Träslövsläge-Morups Tånge	1,975.5	4,882
Tysjöarna	424	1,050
Umeälv delta	1,889	4,670
Vasikkavuoma	200	490
Västra Roxen	4,108	10,150
Vattenån	3,621	8,950
Vindelälven	66,395	164,070

=== Switzerland ===
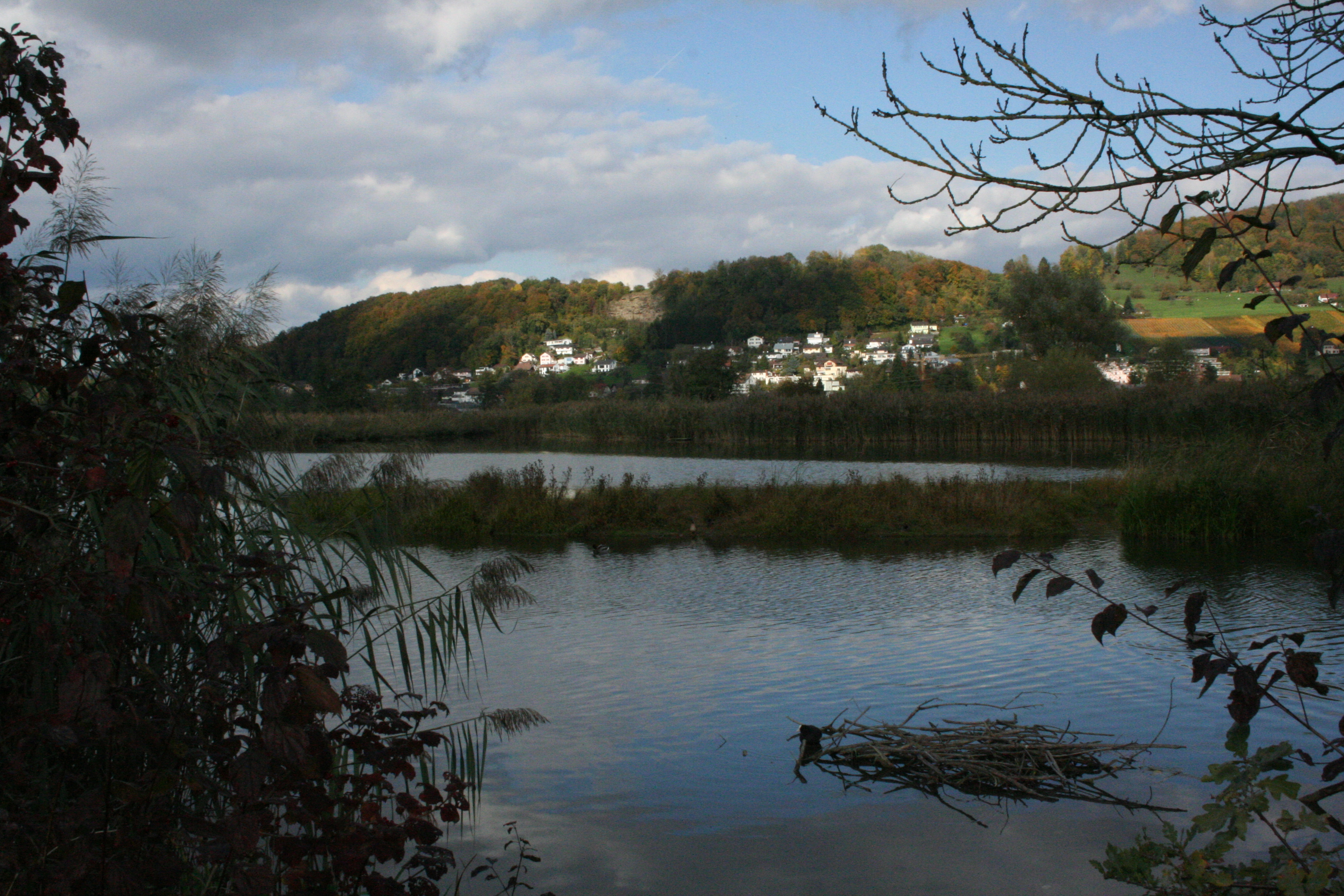
Klingnauer Stausee in Switzerland

Name	Area (ha)	Area (acre)
Bolle di Magadino	663	1,640
Fanel et Chablais de Cudrefin	1,155	2,850
Kaltbrunner Riet	157	390
Klingnauer Stausee	364	900
Laubersmad-Salwidili	1,376	3,400
Le Rhône genevois-Vallons de l'Allondon et de La Laire	1,929.4	4,768
Les Grangettes	6,342.2	15,672
Niederried Stausee	297	730
Rhonegletschervorfeld	317	780
Rive sud du lac de Neuchâtel	1,705.9	4,215
Vadret da Roseg	383	950

=== Turkey ===
Name	Area (ha)	Area (acre)
Akyatan Lagoon	14,700	36,000
Gediz Delta	14,900	37,000
Göksu Delta	15,000	37,000
Kızılırmak Delta	21,700	54,000
Kizören Obrouk	127	310
Lake Burdur	24,800	61,000
Lake Kuş	20,400	50,000
Lake Kuyucuk	416	1,030
Lake Seyfe	10,700	26,000
Lake Uluabat	19,900	49,000
Meke Maar	202	500
Nemrut Caldera	4,589	11,340
Sultan Reedy National Park	17,200	43,000
Yumurtalik Lagoons	19,853	49,060

=== Ukraine ===
Name	Area (ha)	Area (acre)
Archipelago Velyki and Mali Kuchugury	7,740	19,100
Aquatic-cliff complex of Cape Kazantyp	251	620
Aquatic-cliff complex of Karadag	224	550
Aquatic-coastal complex of Cape Opuk	775	1,920
Atak – Borzhavske	283.4	700
Bakotska Bay	1,590	3,900
Berda River Mouth & Berdianska Spit & Berdianska Bay	1,800	4,400
Big Chapelsk Depression	2,359	5,830
Bilosaraiska Bay and Bilosaraiska Spit	2,000	4,900
Black Bog	15	37
Burshtyn Water Reservoir	1,260	3,100
Byle Lake and Koza Berezyna Mire	8,036.5	19,859
Central Syvash	80,000	200,000
Cheremske Bog	2,975.7	7,353
Desna River Floodplains	4,270	10,600
Dniester-Turunchuk Crossrivers Area	76,000	190,000
Dnipro River Delta	26,000	64,000
Dnipro-Oril Floodplains	2,560	6,300
Dnister River Valley	820	2,000
Eastern Syvash	165,000	410,000
Karkinitska and Dzharylgatska Bays	87,000	210,000
Kartal Lake	500	1,200
Kryva Bay and Kryva Spit	1,400	3,500
Kugurlui Lake	6,500	16,000
Kyliiske Mouth	32,800	81,000
Lake Synevyr	29	72
Liadova-Murafa	5,394.3	13,330
Lower Smotrych River	1,480	3,700
Molochnyi Liman	22,400	55,000
Nadsiannia Raised Bog	37	91
Narcissi Valley	256	630
Northern Part of the Dniester Liman	20,000	49,000
Obytochna Spit and Obytochna Bay	2,000	4,900
Ozirnyi-Brebeneskul	1,656.9	4,094
Perebrody Peatlands	12,718	31,430
Pohorilets River Headwaters	1,624.6	4,014
Polissia Mires	2,145	5,300
Prut River Headwaters	4,935.4	12,196
Prypiat River Floodplains	12,000	30,000
Romania-Friendship Cave	0.1	0.25
Sasyk Lake	21,000	52,000
Shagany-Alibei-Burnas Lakes System	19,000	47,000
Shatsk Lakes	32,850	81,200
Sim Maiakiv Floodplain	2,140	5,300
Somyne Swamps	10,852	26,820
Stokhid River Floodplains	10,000	25,000
Syra Pogonia Bog	10,000	25,000
Tendrivska Bay	38,000	94,000
Tyligulskyi Liman	26,000	64,000
Yagorlytska Bay	34,000	84,000

=== United Kingdom ===
Name	Area (ha)	Area (acre)
Abberton Reservoir	726	1,790
Akrotiri	2,171	5,360
Alde-Ore Estuary	2,547	6,290
Alderney West Coast and the Burhou Islands	15,629	38,620
Arun Valley	529	1,310
Avon Valley	1,385	3,420
Ballaugh Curragh	193	480
Ballynahone Bog	243	600
Belfast Lough	432	1,070
Benfleet and Southend Marshes	2,251	5,560
Bertha's Beach	4,000	9,900
Black Bog	183	450
Blackwater Estuary	4,395	10,860
Booby Pond and Rookery	82	200
Breydon Water	1,203	2,970
Bridgend Flats, Islay	331	820
Broadland	4,623	11,420
Burry Inlet	6,672	16,490
Cairngorm Lochs	173	430
Caithness & Sutherland Peatlands	143,503	354,600
Caithness Lochs	1,379	3,410
Cameron Reservoir	69	170
Carlingford Lough	831	2,050
Castle Loch, Lochmaben	108	270
Chesil Beach & The Fleet	748	1,850
Chichester and Langstone Harbours	5,810	14,400
Chippenham Fen	112	280
Claish Moss	568	1,400
Coll	2,209	5,460
Colne Estuary	2,701	6,670
Cors Caron	874	2,160
Cors Fochno & Dyfi	2,508	6,200
Corsydd Mon a Llyn	626	1,550
Cromarty Firth	3,747	9,260
Crouch & Roach Estuaries	1,736	4,290
Crymlyn Bog	268	660
Cuilcagh Mountain	2,744	6,780
Deben Estuary	979	2,420
Dengie	3,127	7,730
Dersingham Bog	158	390
Diego Garcia	35,424	87,530
Din Moss - Hoselaw Loch	51	130
Dornoch Firth and Loch Fleet	7,837	19,370
Dorset Heathlands	6,730	16,600
Duddon Estuary	6,806	16,820
East Sanday Coast	1,515	3,740
Eilean Na Muice Duibhe	576	1,420
Esthwaite Water	137	340
Exe Estuary	2,346	5,800
Fairy Water Bogs	224	550
Fala Flow	318	790
Fardrum and Roosky Turloughs	43	110
Firth of Forth	6,314	15,600
Firth of Tay and Eden Estuary	6,918	17,090
Foulness	10,933	27,020
Garron Plateau	4,650	11,500
Garry Bog	155	380
Gibraltar Point	414	1,020
Gladhouse Reservoir	186	460
Gough Island	229,811	567,880
Greenlaw Moor	248	610
Gruinart Flats, Islay	3,261	8,060
Hamford Water	2,187	5,400
Herm, Jethou and The Humps	1,802.9	4,455
Holburn Lake and Moss	28	69
Humber Estuary	37,988	93,870
Hungry Bay Mangrove Swamp	2	4.9
Inaccessible Island	126,524	312,650
Inner Clyde Estuary	1,825	4,510
Inner Moray Firth	2,339	5,780
Irthinghead Mires	792	1,960
Isles of Scilly	402	990
Kintyre Goose Roosts	312	770
Larne Lough	396	980
Lee Valley	448	1,110
Leighton Moss	129	320
Les Écréhous & Les Dirouilles, Jersey	5,459	13,490
Les Minquiers, Jersey	9,575	23,660
Les Pierres de Lecq	512	1,270
Lewis Peatlands	58,984	145,750
Lihou Island and l'Erée Headland, Guernsey	427	1,060
Lindisfarne	3,679	9,090
Llyn Idwal	14	35
Llyn Tegid	482	1,190
Loch an Duin	2,621	6,480
Loch Eye	205	510
Loch Ken & River Dee Marshes	769	1,900
Loch Leven	1,612	3,980
Loch Lomond	237	590
Loch Maree	3,174	7,840
Loch of Inch & Torrs Warren	2,111	5,220
Loch of Kinnordy	85	210
Loch of Lintrathen	217	540
Loch of Skene	121	300
Loch of Strathbeg	616	1,520
Loch Ruthven	201	500
Loch Spynie	94	230
Lough Foyle	2,204	5,450
Lough Neagh & Lough Beg	50,166	123,960
Lover's Lake Nature Reserve	2	4.9
Lower Derwent Valley	915	2,260
Magheraveely Marl Loughs	59	150
Malham Tarn	286	710
Martin Mere	120	300
Medway Estuary & Marshes	4,697	11,610
Mersey Estuary	5,033	12,440
Midland Meres & Mosses	511	1,260
Midland Meres and Mosses Phase 2	1,588	3,920
Minsmere - Walberswick	2,019	4,990
Montrose Basin	985	2,430
Moray and Nairn Coast	2,412	5,960
Morecambe Bay	37,405	92,430
Muir of Dinnet	158	390
Nene Washes	1,517	3,750
North Norfolk Coast	7,887	19,490
North Uist Machair and Islands	4,705	11,630
North, Middle & East Caicos Islands	58,617	144,850
Northumbria Coast	1,108	2,740
Ouse Washes	2,469	6,100
Paget Marsh	11	27
Pagham Harbour	637	1,570
Pembroke Marsh East	8	20
Pettigoe Plateau	1,264	3,120
Pevensey Levels	3,578	8,840
Poole Harbour	2,439	6,030
Portsmouth Harbour	1,249	3,090
Rannoch Moor	1,519	3,750
Redgrave and South Lopham Fens	127	310
Ribble and Alt Estuaries	13,464	33,270
Rinns of Islay	3,571	8,820
River Spey - Insh Marshes	1,159	2,860
Ronas Hill - North Roe & Tingon	5,470	13,500
Rostherne Mere	80	200
Roydon Common	194	480
Rutland Water	1,360	3,400
Sea Lion Island	1,000	2,500
Severn Estuary	24,701	61,040
Silver Flowe	620	1,500
Sleibhtean agus Cladach Thiriodh	1,939	4,790
Slieve Beagh	1,885	4,660
Solent and Southampton Water	5,415	13,380
Sombrero Island Nature Reserve Marine Park	1,050.7	2,596
Somerset Levels and Moors	6,388	15,790
Somerset Long Bay Pond	1	2.5
South East Coast of Jersey, Channel Islands	3,210	7,900
South Tayside Goose Roosts	331	820
South Uist Machair & Lochs	5,019	12,400
South West London Waterbodies	828	2,050
Spittal Pond	10	25
Stodmarsh	481	1,190
Stour & Orwell Estuaries	3,324	8,210
Strangford Loch	15,581	38,500
Teesmouth & Cleveland Coast	1,247	3,080
Thames Estuary and Marshes	5,589	13,810
Thanet Coast & Sandwich Bay	2,169	5,360
The Dee Estuary	14,302	35,340
The Mersey Narrows and North Wirral Foreshore	2,078	5,130
The New Forest	28,003	69,200
The Swale	6,515	16,100
The Wash	62,212	153,730
Thursley & Ockley Bog	265	650
Turmennan Lough	15	37
Upper Lough Erne	5,818	14,380
Upper Nene Valley Gravel Pits	1,358	3,360
Upper Solway Flats & Marshes	43,637	107,830
Walmore Common	53	130
Warwick Pond	2	4.9
Western Salt Ponds of Anegada	1,071	2,650
Westwater	50	120
Wicken Fen	254	630
Woodwalton Fen	208	510
Ythan Estuary & Meikle Loch	314	780

== Latin America and the Caribbean ==
=== Antigua and Barbuda ===
Name	Area (ha)	Area (acre)
Codrington Lagoon	3,600	8,900

=== Argentina ===
Name	Area (ha)	Area (acre)	Province	Site#	Designated
Bahía de Samborombón	243,965	602,850	Buenos Aires	885	1997-01-24
Bañados del Río Dulce y Laguna de Mar Chiquita	996,000	2,460,000	Córdoba	1176	2002-05-28
Delta del Paraná	243,126	600,780	Santa Fe; Entre Ríos	2255	2015-10-03
Glaciar Vinciguerra y Turberas Asociadas	2,760	6,800	Tierra del Fuego	1886	2009-09-15
Humedal Laguna Melincué	92,000	230,000	Santa Fe	1785	2008-07-24
Humedales Chaco	508,000	1,260,000	Chaco	1366	2004-02-02
Humedales de Península Valdés	42,695	105,500	Chubut	2070	2012-07-20
Jaaukanigás	492,000	1,220,000	Santa Fe	1112	2001-10-10
Laguna Blanca	11,250	27,800	Neuquén	556	1992-05-04
Laguna de Llancanelo	91,365	225,770	Mendoza	759	1995-11-08
Laguna de los Pozuelos	16,224	40,090	Jujuy	555	1992-05-04
Lagunas altoandinas y puneñas de Catamarca	1,228,175	3,034,890	Catamarca	1865	2009-02-02
Lagunas de Guanacache, Desaguadero y del Bebedero	962,370	2,378,100	Mendoza; San Juan; San Luis	1012	1999-12-14
Lagunas de Vilama	157,000	390,000	Jujuy	1040	2000-09-20
Lagunas y Esteros del Iberá	24,550	60,700	Corrientes	1162	2002-01-18
Palmar Yatay	21,450	53,000	Entre Ríos	1969	2011-05-05
Parque Nacional Ciervo de los Pantanos	5,561.31	13,742.3	Buenos Aires	1750	2008-03-22
Parque Provincial El Tromen	30,000	74,000	Neuquén	1626	2006-02-02
Península Mitre	369,417	912,850		2557	20–08–2024
Reserva Costa Atlantica de Tierra del Fuego	28,600	71,000	Tierra del Fuego	745	1995-09-13
Reserva Ecológica Costanera Sur	353	870	Buenos Aires	1459	2005-03-22
Reserva Natural Villavicencio	62,244	153,810	Mendoza	2330	2017-12-27
Reserva Provincial Laguna Brava	405,000	1,000,000	La Rioja	1238	2003-02-02
Rio Pilcomayo	51,889	128,220	Formosa	557	1992-05-04

=== Bahamas ===
Name	Area (ha)	Area (acre)
Inagua National Park	32,600	81,000

=== Barbados ===
Name	Area (ha)	Area (acre)
Graeme Hall Swamp	33	82

=== Belize ===
Name	Area (ha)	Area (acre)
Crooked Tree Wildlife Sanctuary	6,637	16,400
Sarstoon Temash National Park	16,955	41,900

=== Bolivia ===
Name	Area (ha)	Area (acre)
Bañados del Izozog y el río Parapetí	615,882	1,521,880
Cuenca de Tajzara	5,500	14,000
Lago Titicaca	800,000	2,000,000
Lagos Poopó y Uru Uru	967,607	2,391,010
Laguna Concepción	31,124	76,910
Los Lípez	1,427,717	3,527,970
Palmar de las Islas y las Salinas de San José	856,754	2,117,090
Pantanal Boliviano	3,189,888	7,882,380
Río Blanco	2,404,915	5,942,670
Río Matos	1,729,788	4,274,400
Río Yata	2,813,229	6,951,640

=== Brazil ===
Name	Area (ha)	Area (acre)
Abrolhos Marine National Park	91,300	226,000
Amazon Estuary and its Mangroves	3,850,253	9,514,180
Anavilhanas National Park	350,469.8	866,030
Atol das Rocas Biological Reserve	35,186.4	86,947
Baixada Maranhense Environmental Protection Area	1,775,035	4,386,210
Cabo Orange National Park	202,307	499,910
Environmental Protection Area of Cananéia-Iguape-Peruíbe	657,328	1,624,290
Fernando de Noronha Archipelago	10,929.2	27,007
Guaporé Biological Reserve	600,000	1,500,000
Guaraqueçaba Ecological Station	4,370	10,800
Guaratuba	38,329.3	94,714
Ilha do Bananal	562,312	1,389,500
Ilha Grande National Park	76,033.1	187,882
Lagoa do Peixe	34,400	85,000
Lund Warming	23,865.4	58,973
Mamirauá	1,124,000	2,780,000
Pantanal Matogrossense	135,000	330,000
Parque Estadual Marinho do Parcel Manoel Luís including the Baixios do Mestre Álvaro and Tarol	34,555	85,390
Reentrancias Maranhenses	2,680,911	6,624,680
Reserva Particular del Patrimonio Natural Fazenda Rio Negro	7,000	17,000
Reserva Particular do Patrimonio Natural SESC Pantanal	87,871	217,130
Rio Doce State Park	35,973	88,890
Rio Juruá	2,136,489	5,279,380
Rio Negro	12,001,614.4	29,656,635
Taiamã Ecological Station	11,555	28,550
Taim Ecological Station	10,938.6	27,030
Viruá National Park	216,427	534,800

=== Chile ===
Name	Area (ha)	Area (acre)
Bahía Lomas	58,945	145,660
Carlos Anwandter Sanctuary	4,877	12,050
Humedal del río Limarí, desde Salala hasta su desembocadura	527	1,300
Humedal el Yali	520	1,300
Humedales Costeros de la Bahía Tongoy	259	640
Humedales de Monkul	1,380	3,400
Laguna del Negro Francisco y Laguna Santa Rosa	62,460	154,300
Las Salinas de Huentelauquén (LSH)	2,772	6,850
Parque Andino Juncal	13,795	34,090
Salar de Aguas Calientes IV	15,529	38,370
Salar de Pujsa	17,397	42,990
Salar de Surire	15,858	39,190
Salar de Tara	96,439	238,310
Salar del Huasco	6,000	15,000
Santuario de la Naturaleza Laguna Conchalí	34	84
Sistema Hidrológico de Soncor del Salar de Atacama	67,133	165,890

=== Colombia ===
Name	Area (ha)	Area (acre)
Complejo Cenagoso de Ayapel	54,376.8	134,368
Complejo de Humedales de la Estrella Fluvial Inírida (EFI)	250,158.91	618,156.1
Complejo de Humedales del Alto Rio Cauca Asociado a la Laguna de Sonso	5,525	13,650
Complejo de humedales Lagos de Tarapoto	45,464	112,340
Complejo de Humedales Laguna del Otún	6,579	16,260
Complejo de Humedales Urbanos del Distrito Capital de Bogotá	667.4	1,649
Delta del Río Baudó	8,888	21,960
Laguna de la Cocha	39,000	96,000
Sistema Delta Estuarino del Río Magdalena, Ciénaga Grande de Santa Marta	400,000	990,000
Sistema Lacustre de Chingaza	4,058	10,030

=== Costa Rica ===
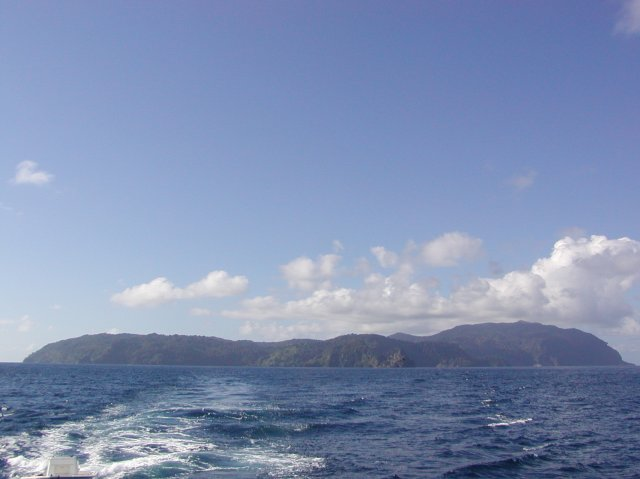
Isla del Coco, Costa Rica

Name	Area (ha)	Area (acre)
Caño Negro	9,969	24,630
Cuenca Embalse Arenal	67,295	166,290
Gandoca-Manzanillo	9,445	23,340
Humedal Caribe Noreste	75,310	186,100
Humedal Maquenque	59,692	147,500
Isla del Coco	99,623	246,170
Laguna Respringue	75	190
Manglar de Potrero Grande	139	340
Palo Verde	24,519	60,590
Tamarindo	500	1,200
Térraba-Sierpe	30,654	75,750
Turberas de Talamanca (Distributed across Chirripó National Park, Tapantí National Park, Los Quetzales National Park, Los Santos Forest Reserve, Vueltas Hill Biological Reserve, Macho River Forest Reserve)	192,520	475,700

=== Cuba ===
Name	Area (ha)	Area (acre)
Buenavista	313,500	775,000
Ciénaga de Lanier y Sur de la Isla de la Juventud	126,200	312,000
Ciénaga de Zapata	452,000	1,120,000
Gran Humedal del Norte de Ciego de Ávila	226,875	560,620
Humedal Delta del Cauto	47,835	118,200
Humedal Río Máximo-Cagüey	22,000	54,000

=== Dominican Republic ===
Name	Area (ha)	Area (acre)
Humedales de Jaragua	32,978.63	81,492.0
Lago Enriquillo	20,000	49,000
Los Humedales de Montecristi y la Línea Noroeste	84,322.2	208,365
Parque Nacional Manglares del Bajo Yuna	77,518.6	191,553
Refugio de Vida Silvestre Laguna Cabral o Rincón	4,600	11,000
Refugio de Vida Silvestre Laguna Redonda y Limón	5,754	14,220

=== Ecuador ===
Name	Area (ha)	Area (acre)
Abras de Mantequilla	22,500	56,000
Complejo de Humedales Cuyabeno Lagartococha Yasuní	773,668.5	1,911,776
Complejo de Humedales Ñucanchi Turupamba	12,290	30,400
Complejo LLanganti	30,355	75,010
Humedales del Sur de Isabela	872	2,150
Isla Santay	4,705	11,630
La Segua	1,835	4,530
La Tembladera	1,471	3,630
Laguna de Cube	113	280
Manglares Churute	35,042	86,590
Manglares del Estuario Interior del Golfo de Guayaquil	15,337	37,900
Parque Nacional Cajas	29,477	72,840
Refugio de Vida Silvestre Isla Santa Clara	45	110
Reserva Biológica Limoncocha	4,613	11,400
Reserva Ecológica de Manglares Cayapas-Mataje	44,847	110,820
Reserva Ecológica El Ángel	17,003	42,020
Sistema Lacustre Lagunas del Compadre	23,952	59,190
Sistema Lacustre Yacuri	27,762	68,600
Zona Marina Parque Nacional Machalilla	14,430	35,700

=== El Salvador ===
Name	Area (ha)	Area (acre)
Area Natural Protegida Laguna del Jocotal	4,479	11,070
Complejo Bahía de Jiquilisco	63,500	157,000
Complejo Barra de Santiago	11,519	28,460
Complejo Güija	10,180	25,200
Complejo Jaltepeque	49,454	122,200
Complejo Los Cobanos	21,312	52,660
Embalse Cerrón Grande	60,698	149,990
Laguna de Olomega	7,557	18,670

=== Grenada ===
Name	Area (ha)	Area (acre)
Levera Wetland	518	1,280

=== Guatemala ===
Name	Area (ha)	Area (acre)
Eco-región Lachuá	53,523	132,260
Manchón-Guamuchal	13,500	33,000
Parque Nacional Laguna del Tigre	335,080	828,000
Parque Nacional Yaxhá-Nakum-Naranjo	37,160	91,800
Punta de Manabique	132,900	328,000
Refugio de Vida Silvestre Bocas del Polochic	21,227	52,450
Reserva de Usos Múltiples Río Sarstún	35,202	86,990

=== Honduras ===
Name	Area (ha)	Area (acre)
Barras de Cuero y Salado	13,225	32,680
Laguna de Bacalar	7,394	18,270
Parque Nacional Jeanette Kawas	79,382.16	196,157.6
Refugio de Vida Silvestre Punta Izopo	11,200	28,000
Sistema de Humedal Laguna de Alvarado	13,846	34,210
Sistema de Humedales Cuyamel-Omoa	30,029	74,200
Sistema de Humedales de la Isla de Guanaja	13,148	32,490
Sistema de Humedales de la Isla de Utila	16,225	40,090
Sistema de Humedales de la Zona Sur de Honduras	75,031.13	185,406.0
Sistema de Humedales de Santa Elena	1,543	3,810
Sistema de Humedales Laguna de Zambuco	649	1,600
Subcuenca del Lago de Yojoa	44,253.94	109,353.9

=== Jamaica ===
Name	Area (ha)	Area (acre)
Black River Lower Morass	85,664	211,680
Mason River Protected Area	82	200
Palisadoes - Port Royal	7,523	18,590
Portland Bight Wetlands and Cays	24,542	60,640

=== Nicaragua ===
Name	Area (ha)	Area (acre)
Cayos Miskitos y Franja Costera Immediata	85,000	210,000
Deltas del Estero Real y Llanos de Apacunca	81,700	202,000
Lago de Apanás-Asturias	5,415	13,380
Los Guatuzos	43,750	108,100
Refugio de Vida Silvestre Río San Juan	43,000	110,000
Sistema de Humedales de la Bahía de Bluefields	86,501	213,750
Sistema de Humedales de San Miguelito	43,475	107,430
Sistema Lacustre Playitas-Moyúa-Tecomapa	1,161	2,870
Sistema Lagunar de Tisma	16,850	41,600

=== Panama ===
Name	Area (ha)	Area (acre)
Bahía de Panamá	85,664	211,680
Complejo de Humedales de Matusagaratí	64,750.2	160,001
Golfo de Montijo	80,765	199,570
Humedal de Importancia Internacional Damani-Guariviara	24,089	59,530
Punta Patiño	13,805	34,110
San San - Pond Sak	16,414	40,560

=== Paraguay ===
Name	Area (ha)	Area (acre)
Estero Milagro	25,000	62,000
Lago Ypoá	100,000	250,000
Laguna Chaco Lodge	2,500	6,200
Laguna Teniente Rojas Silva	8,470	20,900
Río Negro	370,000	910,000
Tifunque	280,000	690,000

=== Peru ===
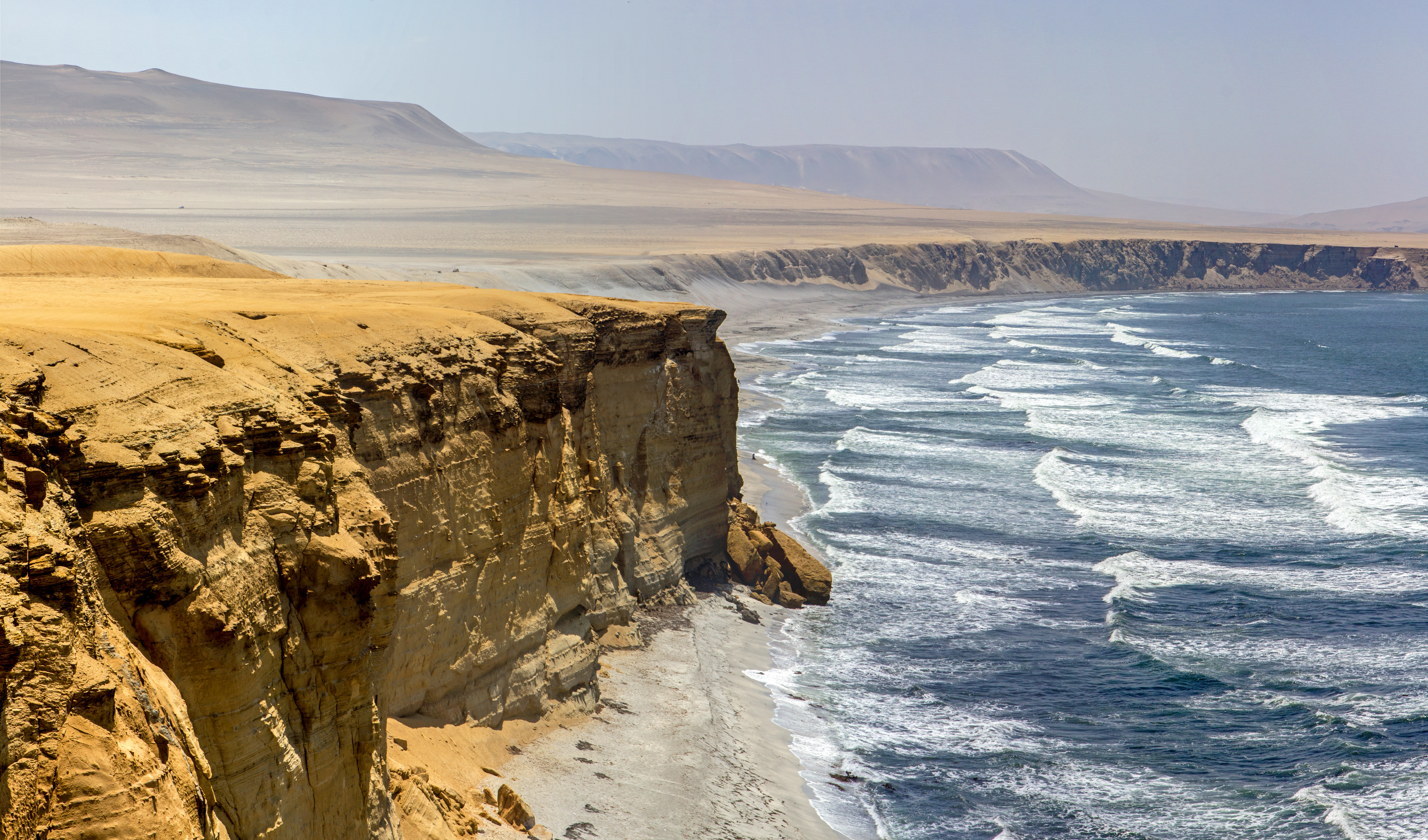
Paracas in Peru

Name	Area (ha)	Area (acre)
Bofedales y Laguna de Salinas	17,657	43,630
Complejo de humedales del Abanico del río Pastaza	3,827,329	9,457,540
Estuario de Virrilá	5,643.8	13,946
Humedal Lucre - Huacarpay	1,979	4,890
Lake Titicaca	460,000	1,100,000
Laguna del Indio - Dique de los Españoles	502	1,240
Lagunas Las Arreviatadas	1,250	3,100
Manglares de San Pedro de Vice	3,399	8,400
Paracas National Reserve	335,000	830,000
Junín National Reserve	53,000	130,000
Reserva Nacional Pacaya-Samiria	2,080,000	5,100,000
Lagunas de Mejía National Sanctuary	691	1,710
Manglares de Tumbes National Sanctuary	2,972	7,340
Zona Reservada Los Pantanos de Villa	263	650

=== Saint Lucia ===
Name	Area (ha)	Area (acre)
Mankòtè Mangrove	60	150
Savannes Bay	25	62

=== Suriname ===
Name	Area (ha)	Area (acre)
Coppenamemonding	12,000	30,000

=== Trinidad and Tobago ===
Name	Area (ha)	Area (acre)
Buccoo Reef / Bon Accord Lagoon Complex	1,287	3,180
Caroni Swamp	8,398	20,750
Nariva Swamp	6,234	15,400

=== Uruguay ===
Name	Area (ha)	Area (acre)
Bañados del Este y Franja Costera	407,408	1,006,730
Esteros de Farrapos e Islas del Río Uruguay	17,495	43,230
Laguna de Rocha	10,933	27,020

=== Venezuela ===
Name	Area (ha)	Area (acre)
Archipielago Los Roques	213,220	526,900
Ciénaga de Los Olivitos	26,000	64,000
Cuare	9,968	24,630
Laguna de la Restinga	5,248	12,970
Laguna de Tacarigua	9,200	23,000

== North America ==
=== Canada ===
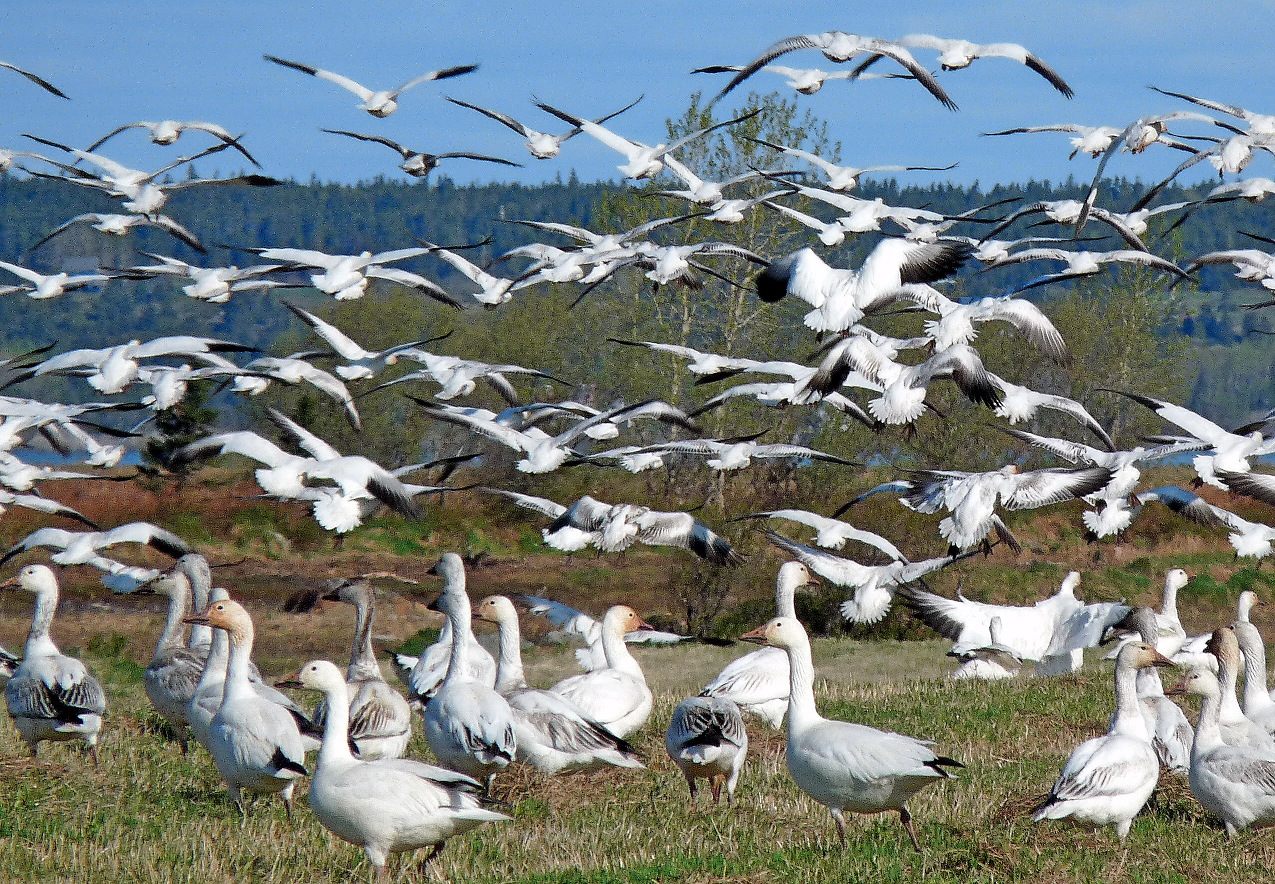
Snow geese in Baie de l'Isle-Verte, Canada

Name	Area (ha)	Area (acre)
Baie de l'Isle-Verte	2,215	5,470
Beaverhill Lake	18,050	44,600
Cap Tourmente	2,398	5,930
Chignecto	1,020	2,500
Columbia Wetlands	15,070	37,200
Creston Valley	6,970	17,200
Delta Marsh	23,000	57,000
Dewey Soper Migratory Bird Sanctuary	815,900	2,016,000
Fraser River Delta	20,682	51,110
Grand Codroy Estuary	925	2,290
Hay-Zama Lakes	50,000	120,000
Lac Saint Pierre	11,952	29,530
Lac Saint-François	2,310	5,700
Last Mountain Lake	15,602	38,550
Long Point	13,730	33,900
Malpeque Bay	24,440	60,400
Mary's Point	1,200	3,000
Matchedash Bay	1,840	4,500
McConnell River	32,800	81,000
Mer Bleue Conservation Area	3,447	8,520
Minesing Swamp	6,000	15,000
Musquodoboit Harbour	1,925	4,760
Oak Hammock Marsh	3,600	8,900
Old Crow Flats	617,000	1,520,000
Peace-Athabasca Delta	321,300	794,000
Point Pelee	1,564	3,860
Polar Bear Pass	262,400	648,000
Polar Bear Provincial Park	2,408,700	5,952,000
Queen Maud Gulf	6,278,200	15,514,000
Quill Lakes	63,500	157,000
Rasmussen Lowlands	300,000	740,000
Shepody Bay	12,200	30,000
Southern Bight-Minas Basin	26,800	66,000
Southern James Bay	25,290	62,500
St. Clair	244	600
Tabusintac Lagoon and River Estuary	4,997	12,350
Whooping Crane Summer Range	1,689,500	4,175,000

=== Mexico ===
Name	Area (ha)	Area (acre)
Agua Dulce	39	96
Anillo de Cenotes	891	2,200
Área de Protección de Flora y Fauna Cuatrociénegas	84,347	208,430
Área de Protección de Flora y Fauna Laguna de Términos	705,016	1,742,130
Área de Protección de Flora y Fauna Yum Balam	154,052	380,670
Área Natural Protegida Estatal Presa de Silva y Zonas Aledañas	3,934	9,720
Áreas de Protección de Flora y Fauna de Nahá y Metzabok	7,216	17,830
Arroyos y Manantiales de Tanchachín	1,174	2,900
Bahía de San Quintín	5,438	13,440
Bala'an K'aax	131,610	325,200
Balandra	449	1,110
Baño de San Ignacio	4,225	10,440
Canal del Infiernillo y esteros del territorio Comcaac	29,700	73,000
Cascadas de Texolo y su entorno	500	1,200
Ciénaga de Tamasopo	1,364	3,370
Ciénegas de Lerma	3,023	7,470
Complejo Lagunar Bahía Guásimas - Estero Lobos	135,198	334,080
Corredor Costero La Asamblea-San Francisquito	44,304	109,480
Cuencas y corales de la zona costera de Huatulco	44,400	110,000
Dzilam	61,707	152,480
Ecosistema Ajos-Bavispe, zona de influencia Cuenca Río San Pedro	182,623	451,270
Ecosistema Arroyo Verde APFF Sierra de Álamos Río Cuchujaqui	174	430
El Jagüey, Buenavista de Peñuelas	35	86
Ensenada de Pabellones	40,639	100,420
Estero de Punta Banda	2,393	5,910
Estero El Chorro	267	660
Estero El Soldado	350	860
Estero La Manzanilla	264	650
Estero Majahuas	786	1,940
Humedal de Importancia Especialmente para la Conservación de Aves Acuáticas Reserva Ría Lagartos	60,348	149,120
Humedal La Sierra de Guadalupe	348,087	860,140
Humedal Los Comondú	460,959	1,139,050
Humedales de Bahía Adair	42,430	104,800
Humedales de Bahía San Jorge	12,198	30,140
Humedales de Guachochi	57.52	142.1
Humedales de la Laguna La Cruz	6,665	16,470
Humedales de la Laguna La Popotera	1,975	4,880
Humedales de Montaña La Kisst	36	89
Humedales de Montaña María Eugenia	86	210
Humedales de Yavaros-Moroncarit	13,627	33,670
Humedales del Delta del Río Colorado	250,000	620,000
Humedales del Lago de Pátzcuaro	707	1,750
Humedales La Libertad	5,432	13,420
Humedales Mogote - Ensenada La Paz	9,184	22,690
Isla Rasa	66	160
Isla San Pedro Mártir	30,165	74,540
Islas Marietas	1,357	3,350
La Alberca de los Espinos	33	82
La Mancha y El Llano	1,414	3,490
La Mintzita	57	140
La Tovara	5,733	14,170
Lago de Chapala	114,659	283,330
Lago de San Juan de los Ahorcados	1,099	2,720
Lago de Texcoco	10,077.4	24,902
Laguna Barra de Navidad	794	1,960
Laguna Chalacatepec	1,093	2,700
Laguna Costera El Caimán	1,125	2,780
Laguna de Atotonilco	2,850	7,000
Laguna de Babícora	26,045	64,360
Laguna de Chichankanab	1,999	4,940
Laguna de Cuyutlán vasos III y IV	4,051	10,010
Laguna de Hueyapan	276	680
Laguna de Metztitlán	2,937	7,260
Laguna de Santiaguillo	24,016	59,340
Laguna de Sayula	16,800	42,000
Laguna de Tamiahua	88,000	220,000
Laguna de Tecocomulco	1,769	4,370
Laguna de Yuriria	15,020	37,100
Laguna de Zacapu	40	99
Laguna de Zapotlán	1,496	3,700
Laguna Hanson, Parque Nacional Constitución de 1857	510	1,300
Laguna Huizache Caimanero	48,283	119,310
Laguna La Juanota	232	570
Laguna Madre	307,894	760,820
Laguna Ojo de Liebre	36,600	90,000
Laguna Playa Colorada-Santa María La Reforma	53,140	131,300
Laguna San Ignacio	17,500	43,000
Laguna Xola-Paramán	775	1,920
Lagunas de Chacahua	17,424	43,060
Lagunas de Santa María-Topolobampo-Ohuira	22,500	56,000
Manantiales Geotermales de Julimes	368	910
Manglares de Nichupté	4,257	10,520
Manglares y humedales de la Laguna de Sontecomapan	8,921	22,040
Manglares y humedales de Tuxpan	6,870	17,000
Manglares y Humedales del Norte de Isla Cozumel	32,786	81,020
Marismas Nacionales	200,000	490,000
Oasis de la Sierra El Pilar	180,803	446,770
Oasis Sierra de La Giganta	41,181	101,760
Otoch Ma'ax Yetel Kooh	5,367	13,260
Parque Estatal Cañón de Fernández	17,002	42,010
Parque Estatal Lagunas de Yalahau	5,683	14,040
Parque Nacional Arrecife Alacranes	334,113	825,610
Parque Nacional Arrecife de Puerto Morelos	9,066	22,400
Parque Nacional Arrecife de Cozumel	11,987	29,620
Parque Nacional Arrecifes de Xcalak	17,949	44,350
Parque Nacional Bahía de Loreto	206,581	510,470
Parque Nacional Cabo Pulmo	7,100	18,000
Parque Nacional Cañón del Sumidero	21,789	53,840
Parque Nacional Isla Contoy	5,126	12,670
Parque Nacional Isla Isabel	94	230
Parque Nacional Lagunas de Montebello	6,022	14,880
Parque Nacional Sistema Arrecifal Veracruzano	52,238	129,080
Playa Barra de la Cruz	18	44
Playa de Colola	287	710
Playa de Maruata	80	200
Playa Tortuguera Cahuitán	65	160
Playa Tortuguera Chenkán	121	300
Playa Tortuguera El Verde Camacho	6,454	15,950
Playa Tortuguera Rancho Nuevo	30	74
Playa Tortuguera Tierra Colorada	54	130
Playa Tortuguera X'cacel-X'cacelito	362	890
Playón Mexiquillo	67	170
Presa de Atlangatepec	1,200	3,000
Presa Jalpan	68	170
Presa La Vega	1,950	4,800
Presa Manuel Ávila Camacho	23,612	58,350
Reserva de la Biosfera Archipiélago de Revillagigedo	636,685	1,573,280
Reserva de la Biosfera Banco Chinchorro	144,360	356,700
Reserva de la Biosfera Chamela-Cuixmala	13,142	32,470
Reserva de la Biosfera La Encrucijada	144,868	357,980
Reserva de la Biosfera Los Petenes	282,857	698,950
Reserva de la Biosfera Pantanos de Centla	302,706	748,000
Reserva de la Biosfera Ría Celestún	81,482	201,350
Reserva Estatal Ciénagas y Manglares de la Costa Norte de Yucatán	54,776.7	135,356
Reserva Estatal El Palmar	50,177	123,990
Rio Sabinas	603,123	1,490,350
Río San Pedro-Meoqui	374	920
Santuario Playa Boca de Apiza - El Chupadero - El Tecuanillo	40	99
Sian Ka'an	652,193	1,611,600
Sistema de Humedales Remanentes del Delta del Río Colorado	127,614	315,340
Sistema de Lagunas Interdunarias de la Ciudad de Veracruz	141	350
Sistema de Represas y Corredores biológicos de la Cuenca Hidrográfica del Río Necaxa	1,541	3,810
Sistema Estuarino Boca del Cielo	8,931	22,070
Sistema Estuarino Puerto Arista	62,138	153,550
Sistema Lacustre Ejidos de Xochimilco y San Gregorio Atlapulco	2,657	6,570
Sistema Lagunar Agiabampo - Bacorehuis - Río Fuerte Antiguo	90,804	224,380
Sistema Lagunar Alvarado	267,010	659,800
Sistema Lagunar Ceuta	1,497	3,700
Sistema Lagunar Estuarino Agua Dulce - El Ermitaño	1,281	3,170
Sistema Lagunar San Ignacio - Navachiste - Macapule	79,873	197,370
Sistema Ripario de la Cuenca y Estero de San José del Cabo	124,219	306,950
Zona Sujeta a Conservación Ecológica Cabildo - Amatal	2,832	7,000
Zona Sujeta a Conservación Ecológica El Gancho - Murillo	4,643	11,470
Zona Sujeta a Conservación Ecológica Sistema Lagunar Catazajá	41,059	101,460

=== United States ===
Name	Area (ha)	Area (acre)
Ash Meadows National Wildlife Refuge	9,509	23,500
Bolinas Lagoon	445	1,100
Cache River - Cypress Creek Wetlands	24,281	60,000
Cache-Lower White Rivers	99,166	245,040
Caddo Lake	7,977	19,710
Catahoula Lake	12,150	30,000
Chesapeake Bay Estuarine Complex	45,000	110,000
Cheyenne Bottoms	10,978	27,130
Chiwaukee Illinois Beach Lake Plain	1,584	3,910
Congaree National Park	10,539	26,040
Connecticut River Estuary and Tidal Wetlands Complex	6,484	16,020
Corkscrew Swamp Sanctuary	5,261	13,000
Delaware Bay Estuary	51,252	126,650
Door Peninsula Coastal Wetlands	4,630.77	11,442.9
Edwin B Forsythe NWR	18,800	46,000
Elkhorn Slough	724	1,790
Everglades National Park	610,497	1,508,570
Francis Beidler Forest	6,438	15,910
Grasslands Wildlife Management Area	65,000	160,000
Horicon Marsh	13,355	33,000
Humbug Marsh	188	460
Izembek Lagoon National Wildlife Refuge	168,433	416,210
Kakagon and Bad River Sloughs	4,355	10,760
Kawainui and Hamakua Marsh Complex	414	1,020
Laguna de Santa Rosa Wetland Complex	1,576	3,890
Lower Wisconsin Riverway	17,700	44,000
Missisquoi Delta and Bay Wetlands	3,102	7,670
Niagara River Corridor	5,247.7	12,967
Okefenokee National Wildlife Refuge	162,635	401,880
Palmyra Atoll National Wildlife Refuge	204,127	504,410
Pelican Island National Wildlife Refuge	2,203	5,440
Quivira National Wildlife Refuge	8,958	22,140
Roswell Artesian Wetlands	917	2,270
San Francisco Bay Estuary	158,711	392,180
Sand Lake National Wildlife Refuge	8,700	21,000
Sue and Wes Dixon Waterfowl Refuge at Hennepin & Hopper Lakes	1,117	2,760
The Emiquon Complex	5,729	14,160
Tijuana River National Estuarine Research Reserve	1,021	2,520
Tomales Bay	2,850	7,000
Upper Mississippi River Floodplain Wetland	122,357	302,350
Wilma H. Schiermeier Olentangy River Wetland Research Park	21	52

== Oceania ==
=== Australia ===
Name	Area (ha)	Area (acre)
Apsley Marshes	865	2,140
Ashmore Reef Commonwealth Marine Reserve	58,300	144,000
Banrock Station Wetland Complex	1,375	3,400
Barmah Forest	28,515	70,460
Becher Point Wetlands	677	1,670
Blue Lake	338	840
Bool and Hacks Lagoons	3,200	7,900
Bowling Green Bay	35,500	88,000
Cape Barren Island, east coast lagoons	4,473	11,050
Caryapundy Swamp	70,176.2	173,409
Cobourg Peninsula	220,700	545,000
Coongie Lakes	2,178,952	5,384,310
Coral Sea Reserves	1,728,920	4,272,300
Corner Inlet	67,186	166,020
Currawinya Lakes	151,300	374,000
Edithvale-Seaford Wetlands	261	640
Eighty-mile Beach	125,000	310,000
Elizabeth and Middleton Reefs Marine National Nature Reserve	187,726	463,880
Fivebough and Tuckerbil Swamps	689	1,700
Forrestdale and Thomsons Lakes	754	1,860
Ginini Flats Subalpine Bog Complex	125	310
Gippsland Lakes	60,015	148,300
Glenelg Estuary and Discovery Bay Ramsar Site	22,289	55,080
Great Sandy Strait	93,160	230,200
Gunbower Forest	19,931	49,250
Gwydir Wetlands: Gingham and Lower Gwydir Watercourses	823	2,030
Hattah-Kulkyne Lakes	955	2,360
Hosnie's Spring	202	500
Hunter Estuary Wetlands	3,388	8,370
Interlaken Lakeside Reserve	520	1,300
Jocks Lagoon	19	47
Kakadu National Park	1,979,766	4,892,110
Kerang Wetlands	9,419	23,270
Lake Albacutya	5,731	14,160
Lake Gore	4,017	9,930
Lake Pinaroo	719	1,780
Lake Warden system	2,300	5,700
Lakes Argyle and Kununurra	150,000	370,000
Lavinia	7,020	17,300
Little Llangothlin Nature Reserve	258	640
Little Waterhouse Lake	56	140
Logan Lagoon	2,320	5,700
Lower Ringarooma River	4,160	10,300
Macquarie Marshes	19,850	49,100
Moreton Bay	113,314	280,000
Moulting Lagoon	4,507	11,140
Muir-Byenup System	10,631	26,270
Myall Lakes	44,612	110,240
Narran Lake Nature Reserve	5,531	13,670
NSW Central Murray State Forests	83,992	207,550
Ord River Floodplain	141,453	349,540
Paroo River Wetlands	138,304	341,760
Peel-Yalgorup system	26,530	65,600
Piccaninnie Ponds Karst Wetlands	862	2,130
Pittwater-Orielton Lagoon	3,175	7,850
Port Phillip Bay & Bellarine Peninsula	22,897	56,580
Pulu Keeling National Park	2,603	6,430
Riverland	30,640	75,700
Roebuck Bay	55,000	140,000
Shoalwater and Corio Bays	239,100	591,000
The Coorong and Lakes Alexandrina and Albert	142,530	352,200
The Dales, Christmas Island	580	1,400
Toolibin Lake	497	1,230
Towra Point	604	1,490
Vasse-Wonnerup system	1,115	2,760
Western District Lakes	32,898	81,290
Western Port	59,297	146,530

=== Fiji ===
Name	Area (ha)	Area (acre)
Qoliqoli Cokovata	134,900	333,000
Upper Navua Conservation Area	615	1,520

=== Kiribati ===
Name	Area (ha)	Area (acre)
Nooto-North Tarawa	1,033	2,550

=== Marshall Islands ===
Name	Area (ha)	Area (acre)
Jaluit Atoll Conservation Area	69,000	170,000
Namdrik Atoll	1,119	2,770

=== New Zealand ===
Name	Area (ha)	Area (acre)
Awarua Wetland	20,000	49,000
Farewell Spit	11,388	28,140
Firth of Thames	7,800	19,000
Kopuatai Peat Dome	10,201	25,210
Manawatu river mouth and estuary	200	490
Wairarapa Moana Wetland	10,547	26,060
Whangamarino	5,923	14,640

=== Palau ===
Name	Area (ha)	Area (acre)
Lake Ngardok Nature Reserve	500	1,200

=== Papua New Guinea ===
Name	Area (ha)	Area (acre)
Lake Kutubu	4,924	12,170
Tonda Wildlife Management Area	590,000	1,500,000

=== Samoa ===
Name	Area (ha)	Area (acre)
Lake Lanoto'o	470	1,200
O Le Pupū Puē National Park	5,019	12,400
Vaipu Swamp Conservation Area	278.3	688

=== Vanuatu ===
Name	Area (ha)	Area (acre)
Lake Letes	8,248.1	20,381

== See also ==
- Ramsar Convention
- List of parties to the Ramsar Convention
- Ramsar Wetland Conservation Award
