= List of Ramsar sites in Estonia =

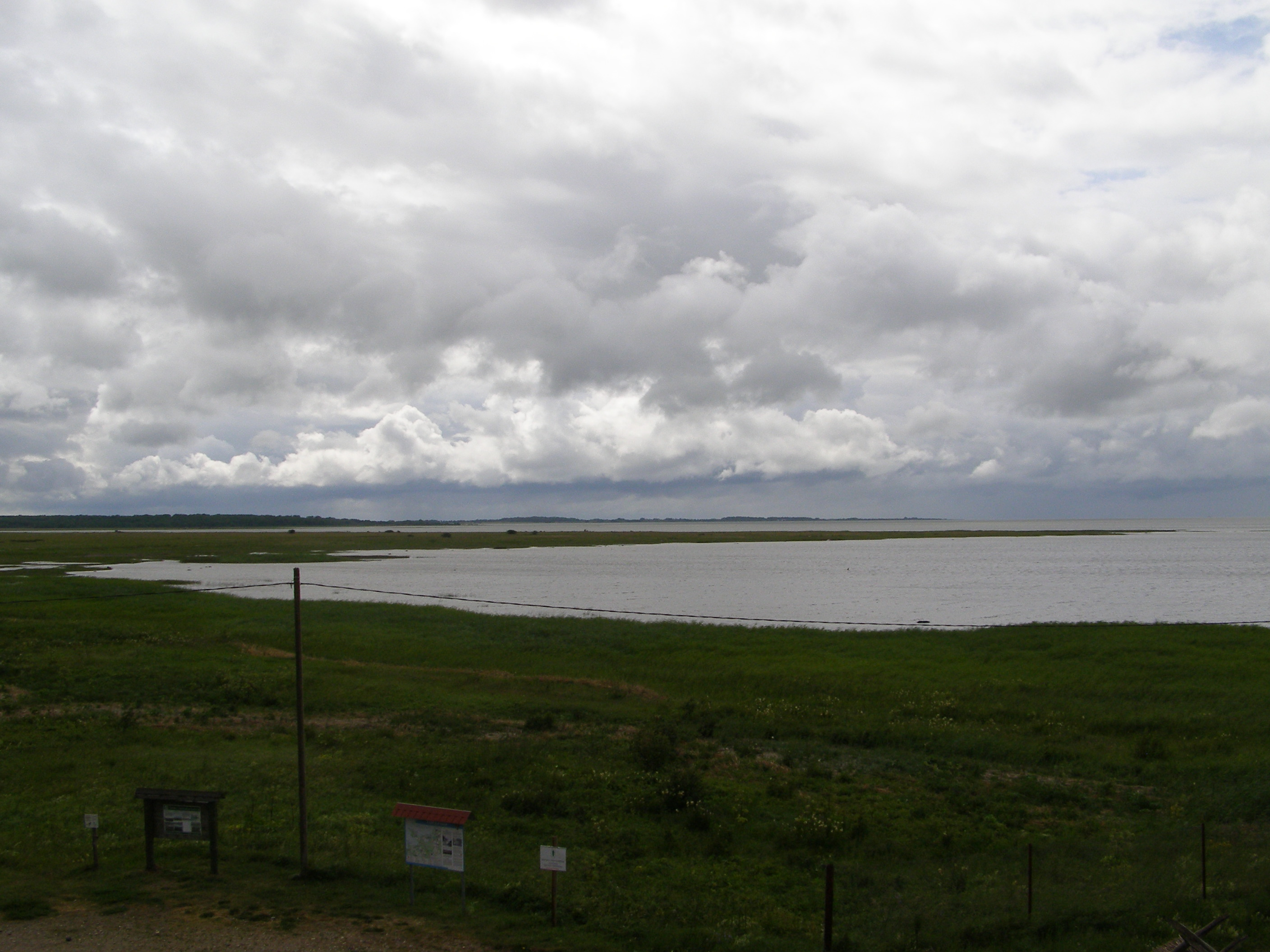
View on Matsalu Bay from Keemu bird-watching tower

Ramsar sites in Estonia include wetlands of international importance under the Ramsar Convention. Estonia has 17 sites designated as "Wetlands of International Importance". The total area of Ramsar sites in Estonia is about 2,818.6 square kilometres (1,088.3 sq mi), or about 1/16 of the whole country.

== List of Ramsar sites ==
Name (English)	Name (Estonian)	Location	Designated	Area (km^{2})	Coordinates
Agusalu Nature Reserve	Agusalu	Ida-Viru County, Alutaguse Parish, Agusalu	2012-01-26	1106.2	59.0892°N 27.5197°E
Alam-Pedja Nature Reserve	Alam-Pedja looduskaitseala	Tartu County, Tartu, Ilmatsalu		3439.6	58.4739°N 26.1697°E
Emajõe-Suursoo and Piirissaar	Emajõe-Suursoo ja Piirissaar	Tartu County, Kastre Parish, Ahunapalu		1898.3	58.385°N 27.3117°E
Endla Nature Reserve	Endla looduskaitseala	Jõgeva County, Jõgeva Parish, Kärde		101.6	58.8644°N 26.1278°E
Haapsalu-Noarootsi Wetland Complex	Haapsalu-Noarootsi	Lääne County, Lääne-Nigula Parish, Kudani	2012-04-01	2758.9	59.1347°N 23.5411°E
Hiiumaa islets and Käina Bay	Hiiumaa laiud ja Käina laht	Hiiu County, Hiiumaa Parish, Aruküla		836.6	58.7922°N 22.9689°E
Laidevahe Nature Reserve	Laidevahe looduskaitseala	Saare County, Saaremaa Parish, Oessaare		245.5	58.3186°N 22.8581°E
Leidissoo Nature Reserve	Leidissoo	Lääne County, Lääne-Nigula Parish, Höbringi	2012-01-26	822.1	59.0947°N 23.7208°E
Lihula Landscape Conservation Area	Lihula	Pärnu County, Lääneranna Parish, Hälvati	2012-01-26	665.4	58.6569°N 23.9492°E
Luitemaa Nature Reserve	Luitemaa	Pärnu County, Häädemeeste Parish, Häädemeeste	2012-01-19	1130.1	58.1586°N 24.5683°E
Matsalu Nature Reserve	Matsalu looduskaitseala	Lääne County, Lääne-Nigula Parish, Keskvere		488.7	58.7592°N 23.6483°E
Muraka Nature Reserve	Muraka looduskaitseala	Ida-Viru County, Alutaguse Parish, Lõpe		1405.9	59.1486°N 27.1147°E
Nigula Nature Reserve	Nigula looduskaitseala	Pärnu County, Häädemeeste Parish, Urissaare		643.1	58.0111°N 24.6831°E
Puhtu-Laelatu-Nehatu Wetland Complex	Puhtu-Laelatu-Nehatu	Pärnu County, Lääneranna Parish, Hõbesalu		379	58.5617°N 23.5881°E
Sookuninga Nature Reserve	Sookuninga looduskaitseala	Pärnu County, Saarde Parish, Veelikse		589.9	57.9969°N 24.8297°E
Soomaa National Park	Soomaa Rahvuspark	Viljandi County, Põhja-Sakala Parish, Lemmakõnnu		3984.4	58.4483°N 25.1194°E
Vilsandi National Park	Vilsandi rahvuspark	Saare County, Saaremaa Parish, Lümanda-Kulli		2388.3	58.3861°N 21.8944°E

== See also ==
- List of Ramsar wetlands of international importance
- Protected areas of Estonia
- List of protected areas of Estonia

== Notes ==
1. Link leads to the protected area page in the Estonian Environmental Registry (in Estonian)
2. Larger areas may extend into the neighboring parishes and counties
