= Laidevahe Nature Reserve =

Protected area in Estonia

- Location within Estonia
- Location: Estonia
- Nearest city: Kuressaare
- Coordinates: 58°20′09″N 22°48′02″E
- Area: 2,442 ha (6,030 acres)
- Established: 2002

Ramsar Wetland
- Designated: 31 March 2003
- Reference no.: 1271

Laidevahe Nature Reserve (Estonian: Laidevahe looduskaitseala) is a nature reserve situated on Saaremaa in western Estonia, in Saare County.

Laidevahe nature reserve protects an area of coastal wetlands, comprising salt marshes, islets, small lagoons, coastal meadows and so on, but also areas of old-growth forest and alvars. The area is internationally recognized as an important habitat for several species of birds, including the white-tailed eagle which has bred in the area since at least 1995. Other notable bird species found in Laidevahe are dunlin (Calidris alpina), barnacle goose (Branta leucopsis) and little crake (Porzana parva). The coastal nature reserve is also rich in fish, and in addition is a habitat for both otter and grey seal. As for the flora, several species of orchid grow in the nature reserve - for example, early purple orchid, greater butterfly orchid and lady slipper orchids.

== Vegetation ==
The Laidevahe Nature Reserve comprises a myriad of wetland areas. It has lagoons, coastal lakes and saltmarshes, consists of over 40 islets and has large swathes of reedbeds. This diverse vegetation type forms the core of the West Estonian Archipelago Biosphere Reserve (1990). The wetlands are also endowed with small areas of boreo-nemoral broadleaved forests, alvars and dry meadows.

== Cultural Monuments ==
In the vicinity of the Laidevahe Nature Reserve are the Püha and Valjala medieval churches.

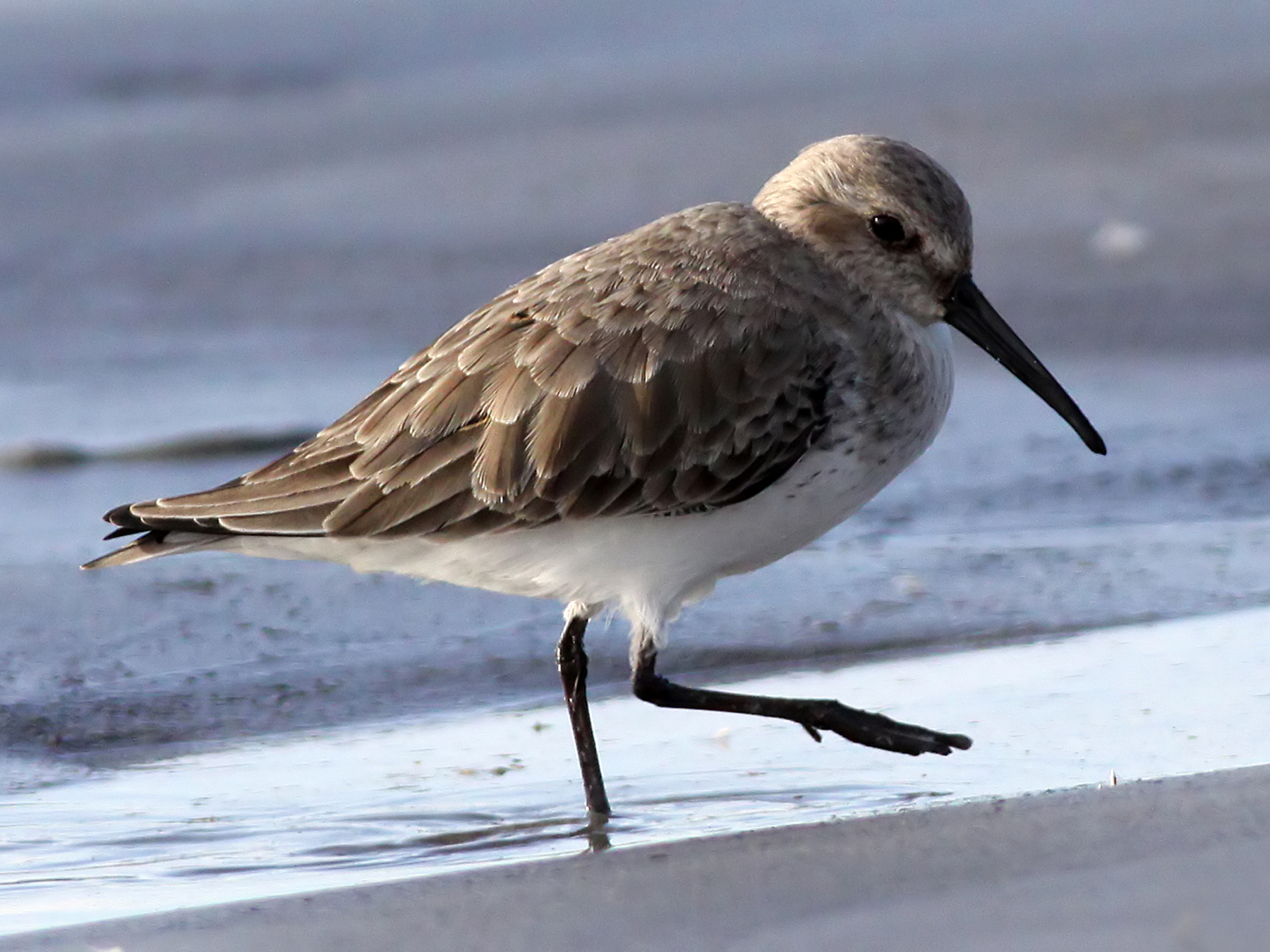
Dunlin (Calidris alpina)

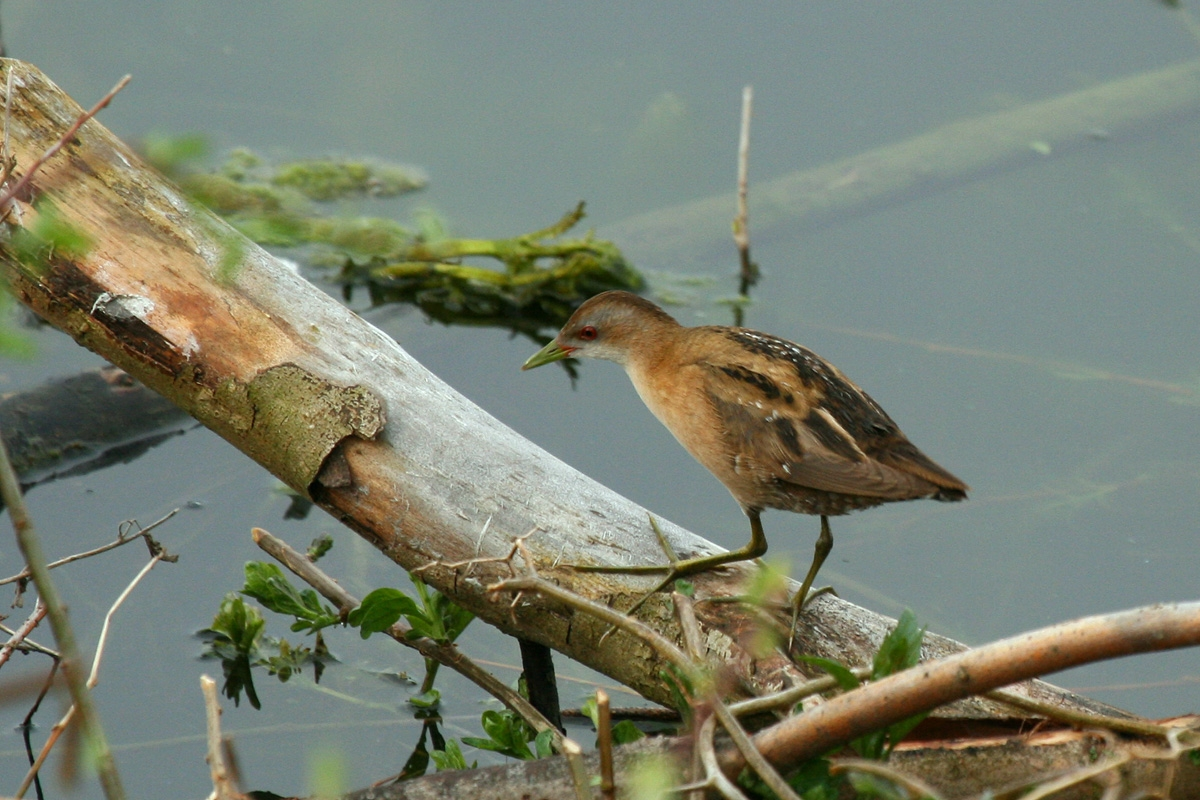
Little crake (Porzana parva)

== See also ==
- Protected areas of Estonia
- List of protected areas of Estonia
- List of Ramsar sites in Estonia
