= Agusalu Nature Reserve =

Protected area in Estonia

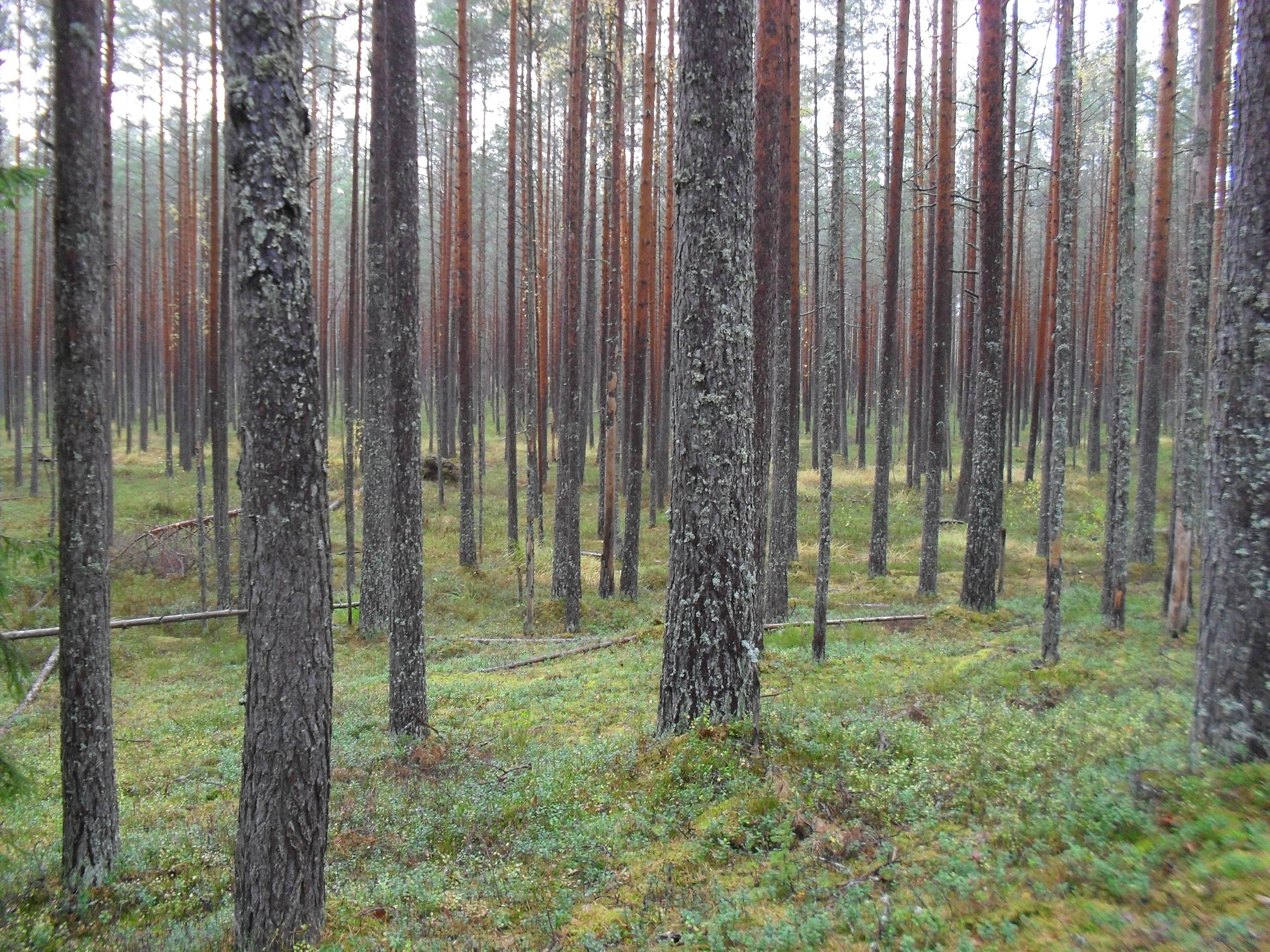

- Location within Estonia
- Location: Estonia
- Nearest city: Jõhvi
- Coordinates: 59°03′58″N 27°32′39″E
- Area: 11,003 ha (27,190 acres)

Ramsar Wetland
- Official name: Agusalu
- Designated: 27 January 2010
- Reference no.: 1999

Agusalu Nature Reserve is a nature reserve situated in eastern Estonia, in Ida-Viru County.

The nature reserve encompasses a portion of a large area of wetland, and the landscape is dominated by bogs; however it is also the location of the only system of continental sand dunes in Estonia, overgrown with rare old-growth forest.

Approximately 20% of the wetland area is covered by Estonia’s only continental dunes, which number around 200. These dunes typically range in height from 7 to 18 meters, with lengths between 200 and 3,000 meters and widths of 20 to 200 meters. The dunes support old-growth natural forests, which are rare both in Estonia and across Europe. The landscape features abrupt transitions between wet and dry environments, as well as between different habitat types, making all stages of bog development observable.

The area has traditionally been difficult to access and therefore the traces of human influence are very limited. It even served as a refuge for local people during times of war. Oil shale mining in the vicinity, as well as intensified forestry, are today the major threats to the area's unique environment.

The area is home to a number of rare or protected species. From the fauna, gray wolf and Eurasian lynx can be mentioned, as well as several birds - it is the most important nesting area in Estonia for the common greenshank and home to the white-tailed eagle (Haliaeetus albicilla), golden eagle (Aquila chrysaetos), capercaillie (Tetrao urogallus), and willow grouse (Lagopus lagopus). Plant species include unusual orchids.

Today, the area has been equipped with a bicycle trail and other facilities for visitors.

== See also ==
- Protected areas of Estonia
- List of protected areas of Estonia
- List of Ramsar sites in Estonia
