= Nigula Nature Reserve =

Protected area in Estonia

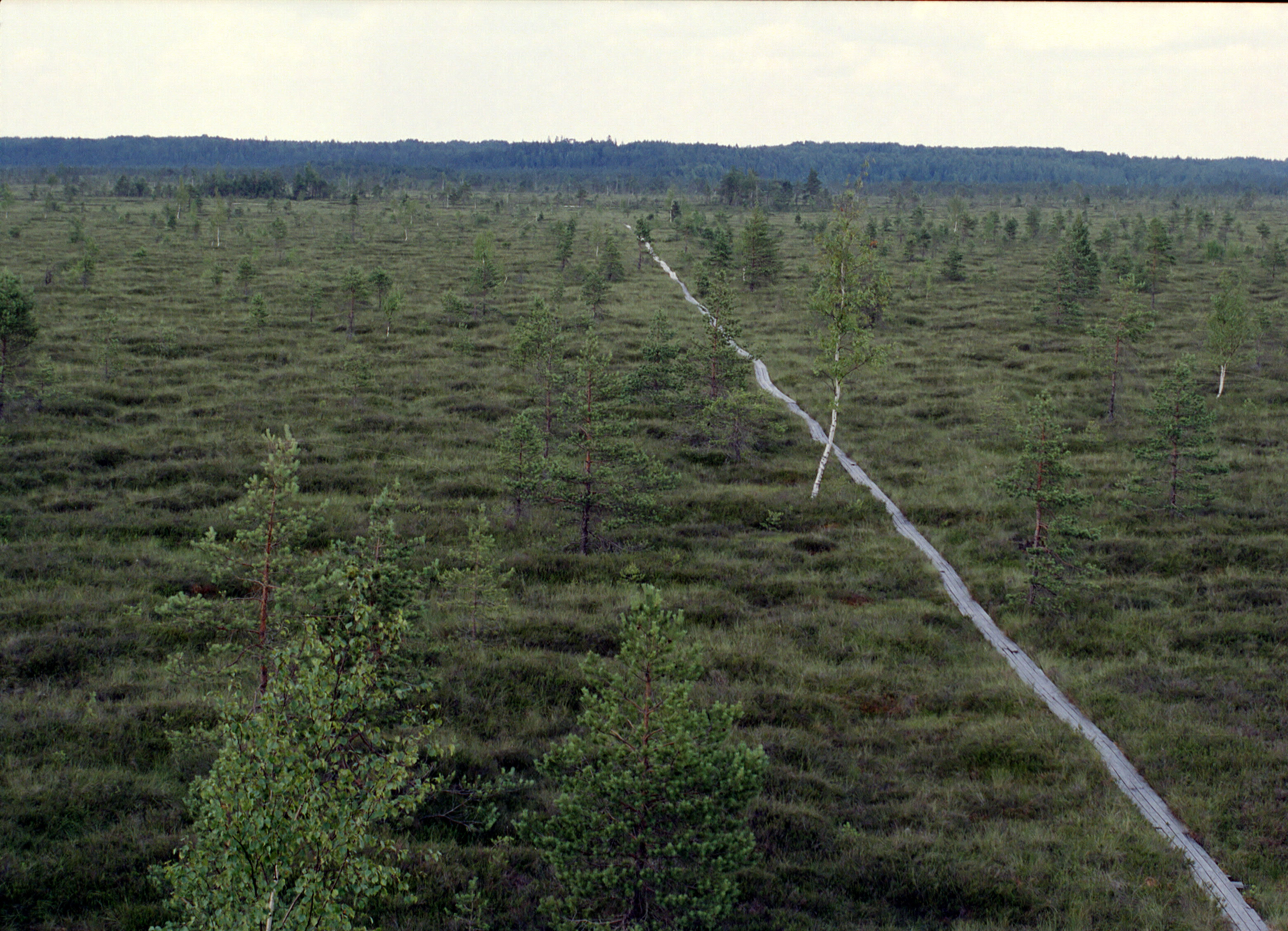

- Location within Estonia
- Location: Estonia
- Nearest city: Pärnu
- Coordinates: 58°00′58″N 24°43′12″E
- Area: 64 km^{2} (25 sq mi)
- Established: 1957

Ramsar Wetland
- Designated: 17 June 1997
- Reference no.: 910

Nigula Nature Reserve (Estonian: Nigula looduskaitseala) is a nature reserve situated in South-West of Estonia, in Häädemeeste and Saarde parishes of Pärnu County. It has an area of 63.98 km². Nigula nature reserve is one of the oldest bog reserves in Estonia. It is established to protect the Nigula Bog and its surrounding forests in their natural state.

== Wildlife in Nigula ==
The core habitat of Nigula Nature Reserve is the Nigula bog, which is a typical Western-Estonian bog. In a medium-sized bog (~30 km²) can be found all the different bog habitats like hummocky bog, pool-bog, hollow bog, wooden-bog, mineral bog-islands and also transitional mire in the lagg-zone. In the surrounding areas can be found old untouched swamp forests, but also managed forests. The farmlands that generate a buffer-zone around the bog and forests are managed extensively. Here can be found both natural grasslands and cultivated fields.

The heterogeneity of different landscapes and habitats gives good possibilities for wildlife. Nigula is an important bird area, it is a stopping area for migratory geese, swans and cranes, it is an important habitat for wetland birds and also favourable area for many different raptor species. The reserve is also an important habitat for large carnivores (brown bear, wolf, lynx) and big game animals (moose, roe deer, red deer, wild boar etc.). Nigula is a part of North-Livonian transboundary wetlands and forests complex.

== History ==
Nigula Nature Reserve was established in 1958. New protection rules, that added the surrounding forests and farmlands to the nature reserve were fixed in 1979. In 1979 Nigula Nature Reserve got its first international designation as Important Bird Area The nature reserve has its independent administrative organisation since 1991 when Nigula Nature Reserve Administration was established. The nature reserve was designated as a Ramsar convention area in 1997.

In 2005 Nigula Nature Reserve was added to the Natura 2000 network.

== Nigula Nature Reserve Administration ==
Nigula Nature Reserve Administration is an organisation that manages Nigula and Sookuninga Nature Reserves that are situated in South-West of Estonia on the Border of Estonia and Latvia. The main activities of Nigula NRA are: protected area management, research and monitoring, species protection, compilation of management plans and protection rules, introducing the values of the protected areas and transboundary cooperation with Latvian North Vidzeme Biosphere Reserve in North Livonia.

== See also ==
- Protected areas of Estonia
- List of protected areas of Estonia
- List of Ramsar sites in Estonia
