= Soomaa National Park =

Protected area in Estonia

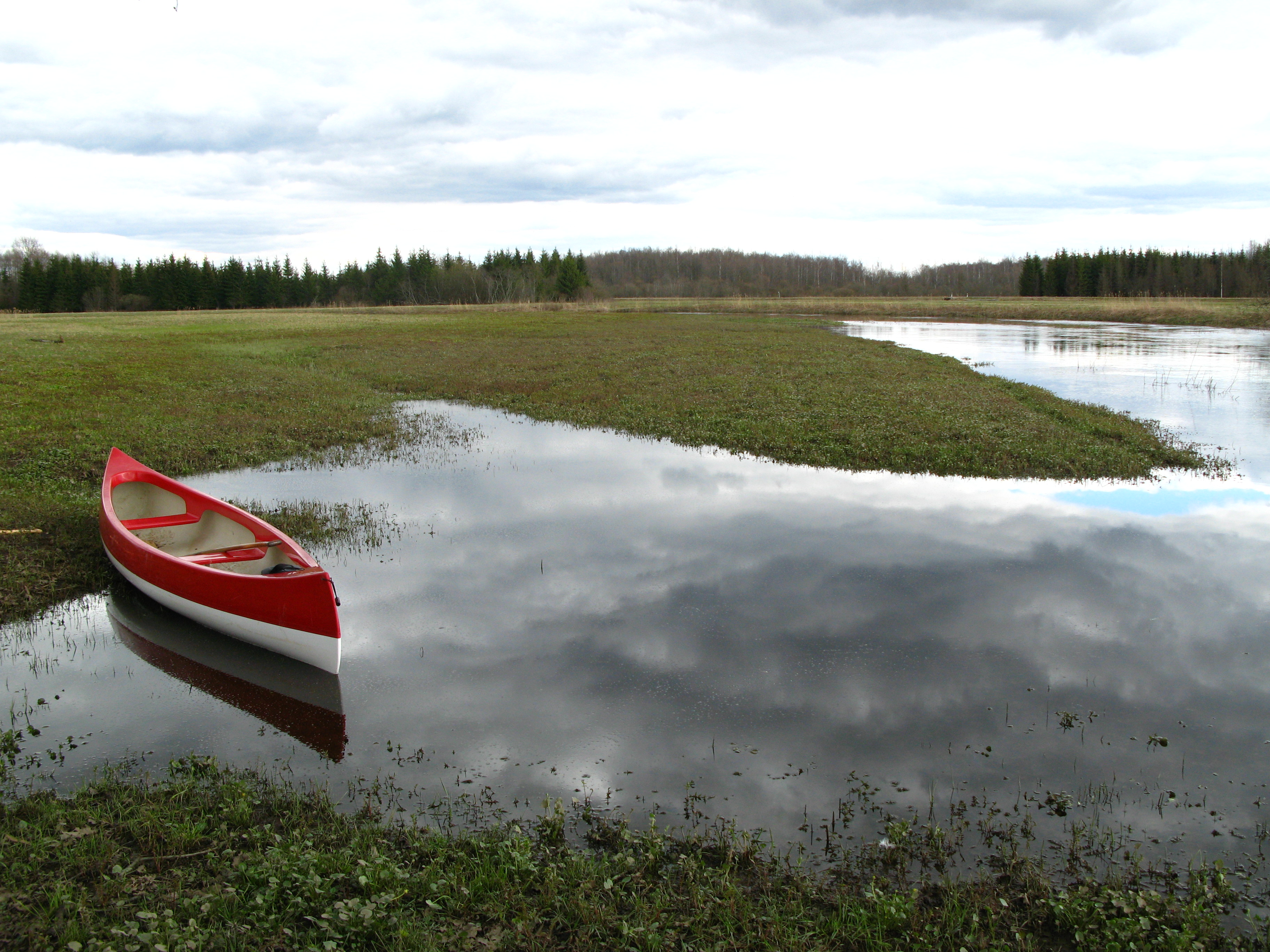
- The Raudna river

- Location within Estonia
- Location: Viljandi, Estonia
- Coordinates: 58°26′27″N 25°6′20″E
- Area: 359 km^{2} (139 sq mi)
- Established: 8 December 1993
- Website: www.soomaa.ee

Drone video of Soomaa National Park great flood on the Tõramaa river near former Tõramaa village in Estonia, Pärnumaa (April 2023)

Soomaa National Park (Estonian: Soomaa rahvuspark) is a national park in south-western Estonia. Soomaa ("land of bogs") protects 390 km^{2}. The park was created in 1993. Since 1989, Soomaa has been an Important Bird Area, a Ramsar site of protected wetlands since 1997, and a Natura 2000 area since 2004.

== Geography ==
The national park, situated in Vahe-Eesti (aka Meso-Estonia), was created in 1993 to protect large raised bogs, flood plain grasslands, paludified forests, and meandering rivers. The territory of the national park is mostly covered with large mires, separated from each other by the rivers of the Pärnu River basin — the Navesti, Halliste, Raudna and Lemmjõgi rivers. Of the raised bogs, the most notable is the Kuresoo Bog, whose steep southern slope, falling into Lemmejõgi, rises by 8 metres over a distance of 100 m.

On the eastern edge of the national park lie the highest dunes on the Estonian mainland, situated approximately 50 kilometres off the contemporary coastline. The Baltic Ice Lake, the most characteristic coastal formation and predecessor to the present Baltic Sea (11,200–10,600 years ago), marks the one-time water level and are situated on the north-western and western edges of the Sakala Upland. The Ruunaraipe Dunes are the highest of the area. The dune ridge is a 1.2 km-long sand ridge, winding from northwest to southeast, whose maximum height is 12 metres.

In 2009, the Soomaa National Park joined the PAN Parks network of wilderness areas as the largest intact peat bog system in Europe preserved as wilderness. It has proven excellent for combining wilderness protection and sustainable tourism development.

== Floods ==
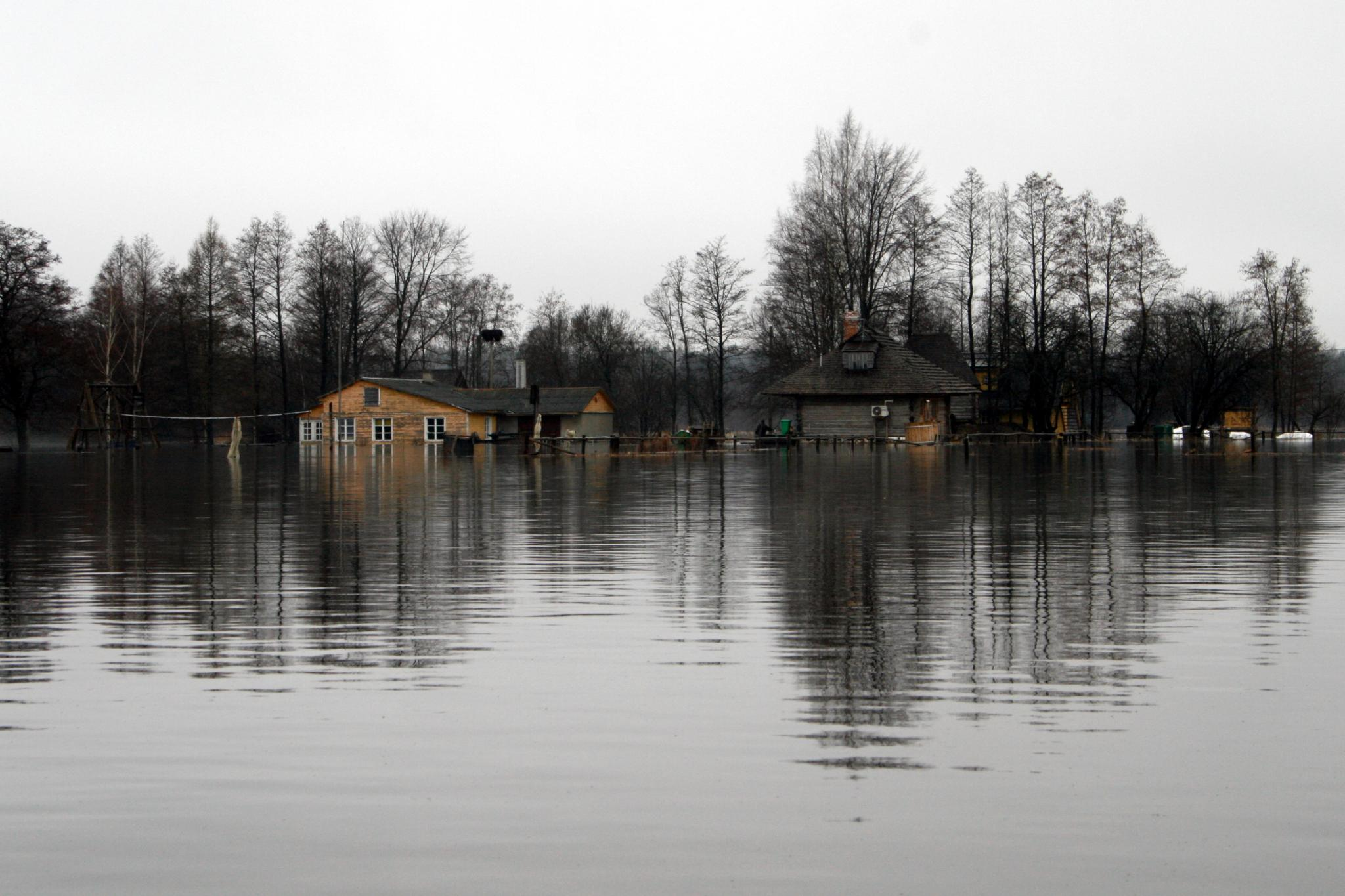
Seasonally flooded farmstead.

When vast amounts of water run down the Sakala Upland, the rivers of Soomaa cannot contain it all. The water flows over flood plain grasslands and forests, and covers roads, disrupting connections to the outer world. Some years, the spring floods have risen by a meter a day for 3–4 days.

This process has formed the Riisa flood area; with a surface area covering 175 square kilometres at its largest, it is the largest regularly flooded area in Estonia and Northern Europe. At its maximum flood level, the water-covered area can be 7–8 km wide. Steep-sloped, raised bogs stand as islands in the water. The flood is often called the "fifth season" in Soomaa, which usually occurs at the end of March or early April.

== Flora and fauna ==
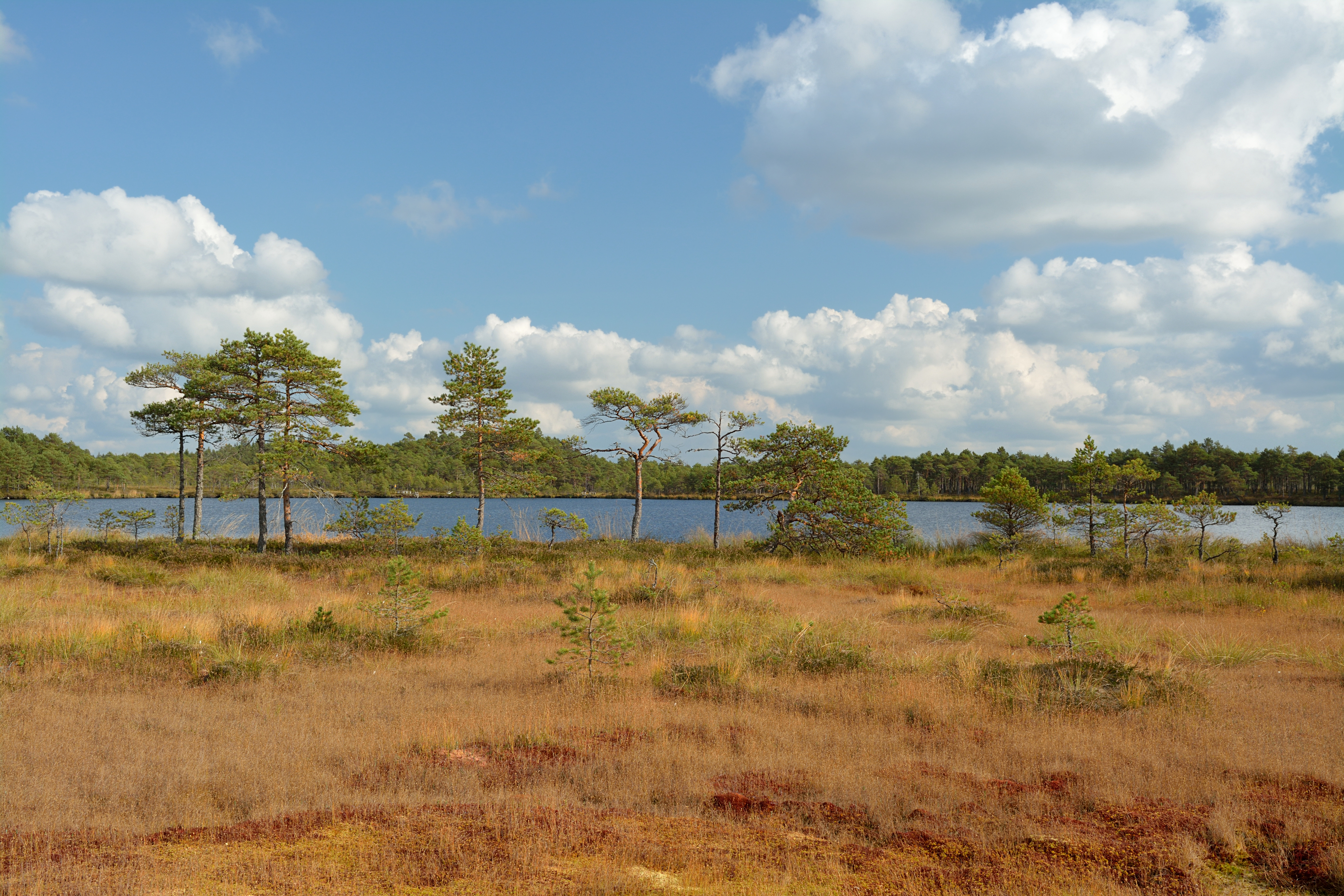
Ördi bog.

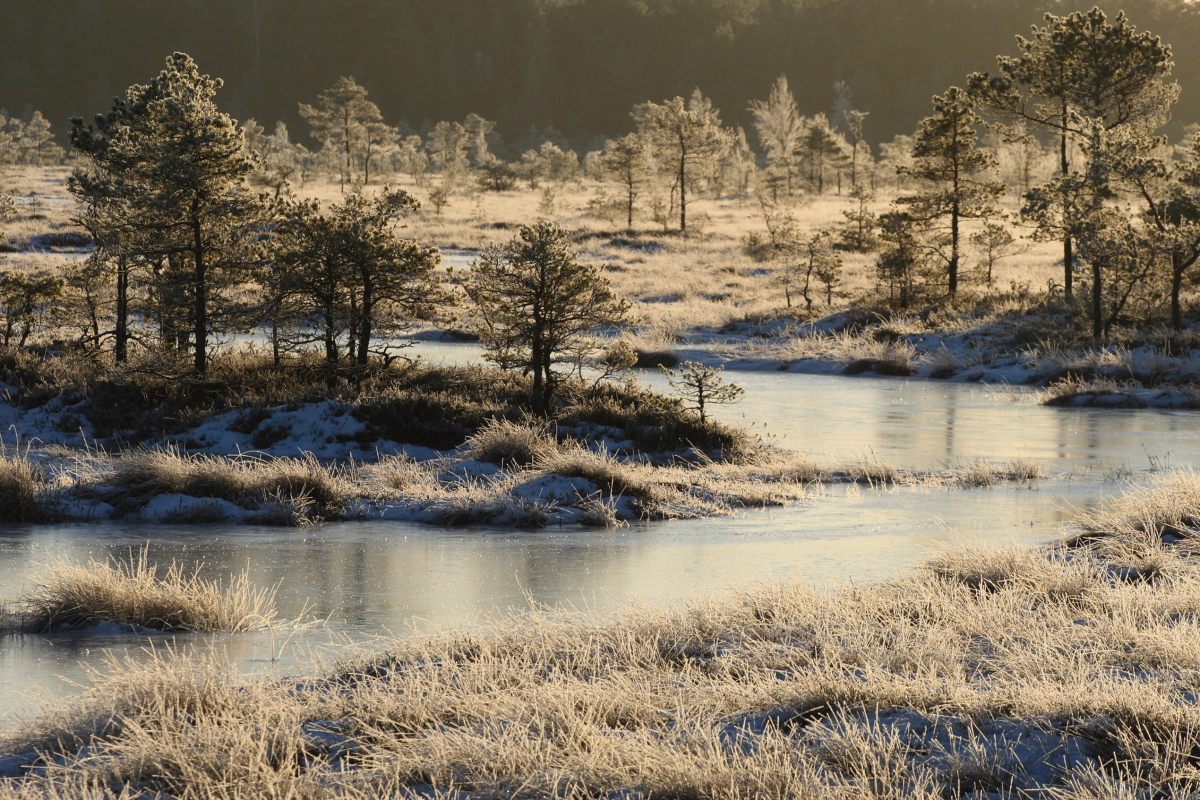
Riisa bog.

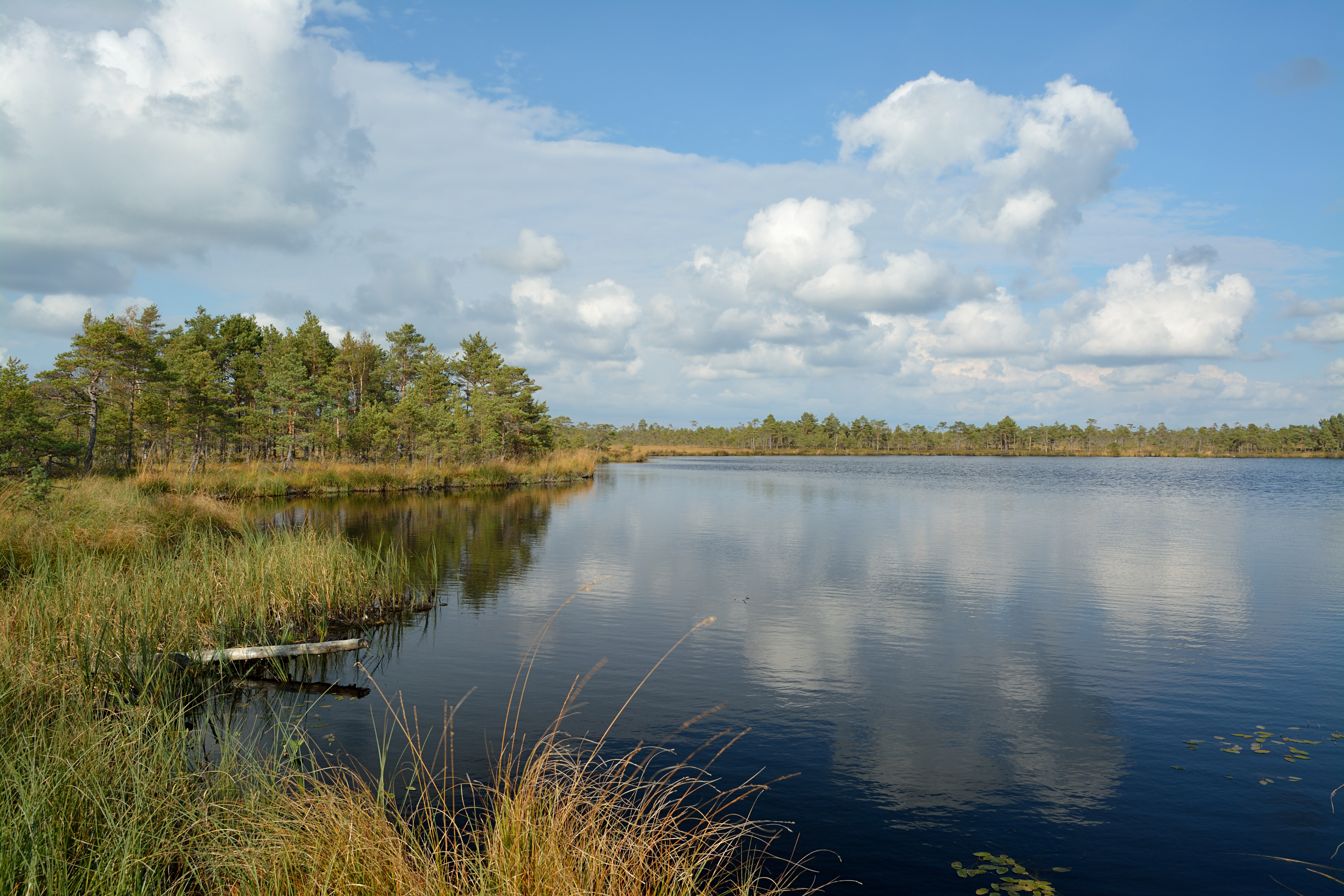
Ördi lake.

Soomaa National Park is the most valuable part of the remaining extensive wilderness area in South-West Estonia. Kuresoo Bog is one of the two best surviving large bogs in Estonia, containing one of the highest species diversity.

Flora

The alluvial meadows and forests that cover the riverbanks are of great botanical value. Approximately 200 species have been recorded, including Gladiolus imbricatus (Turkish marsh gladiolus), Iris sibirica (Siberian iris), and Sedum telephium (Orpine). The unique swamp forests (carrs) surrounding the site are also of special interest.

Fauna

The site regularly supports more than 1% of the individuals in the relevant populations of Bewick's swan and common crane; the composition of bird species in these bogs, especially Kuresoo, is one of the most representative in Estonia. Species recorded include the golden eagle, Eurasian whimbrel (more than 100 pairs), European golden plover (ca. 150 pairs), dunlin (ssp. schinzii), merlin, willow ptarmigan and Montagu's harrier.

During the autumn migration, it is a stopover and roosting site for the common crane (ca. 1,000) and Bewick's swan (ca. 500). During spring migration there are around 2,000 Bewick's swan. Corncrake are numerous on floodplain meadows (50-100 pairs). It is an important spawning ground for the northern pike.

As a large wilderness area, Soomaa serves as a home and breeding area for several mammal species that are very rare or extinct in other parts of Europe. The most common large mammal species to the area are roe deer, elk and wild boar. Eurasian beaver, Eurasian lynx, grey wolf and brown bear are also commonly found.

Research

Soomaa National Park and its surroundings are some of the main research areas for studying large carnivores and herbivores in Estonia. Starting in 2004, several cooperation projects have been organised between State Nature Conservation Centre and universities in Estonia and abroad. The main goal within these studies has been telemetric observation of species like Eurasian lynx and grey wolf.

In 2009 Soomaa received the PAN Parks certification for its excellence in combining wilderness protection and sustainable tourism development.

== Traditional culture ==
Over the last 70 years, Soomaa National Park area has faced significant changes due to the economic and political situation in the 20th century. During this time human habitation has decreased more than 10 times (87 people according to local municipalities in 2011). This reduction in human inhabitants has led to much tangible and intangible cultural heritage being lost as well. In 2007, a web page was created to preserve much of what is left or gathered to museums throughout the years. A project carried out by local NGOs and the Estonian Literary Museum brought back several toponyms, crucial for understanding the area's past history. These toponyms play an important role in modern conservation. Knowledge of traditional landscape usage, read from these names, can give a better understanding of the changes in the region's ecology.

Due to its remote location, Soomaa is possibly the only place in Europe where the tradition of making dugout canoes (Estonian: haabjas) survived into the 20th and 21st centuries. In recent decades, a new surge of interest in making dugouts has revitalized the ancient tradition.

To support Soomaa National Park and its administration, several NGOs have taken action in different fields:

- Estonian Fund for Nature is one of the initiators on creating of Soomaa NP. Organiser of different monitoring works and conservation holidays today.
- Estonian Fund for Nature is one of the oldest NGOs in the region, dealing mostly with different conservation issues and people living in Tipu village.
- Tipu Nature School is responsible for nature educational programs.
- Mardu Studio is attempting to revitalize one of the only farms left in Soomaa area. Studying local intangible heritage and building an open studio for artists and designers.

== Recreation and tourism ==
=== Visitor Centre ===
The Soomaa National Park Visitor Centre is situated in South-West Estonia between Pärnu and Viljandi county. It is located in the middle of a park 44 km away from the centre of Viljandi and Pärnu cities. Construction of the visitor centre was finished in 1998. It has been placed on the historical crossroad of ancient winter roadways used into the beginning of 20th century for transporting goods from Pärnu to Viljandi.

The goal of the Visitor Centre is to give any information needed for tourists who come to explore the nature of Soomaa. There is printed out information for several nature trails as well as media guides, films and a small public library. It is also possible to view educational lectures on nature and participate in different workshops and programs.

=== Activities ===
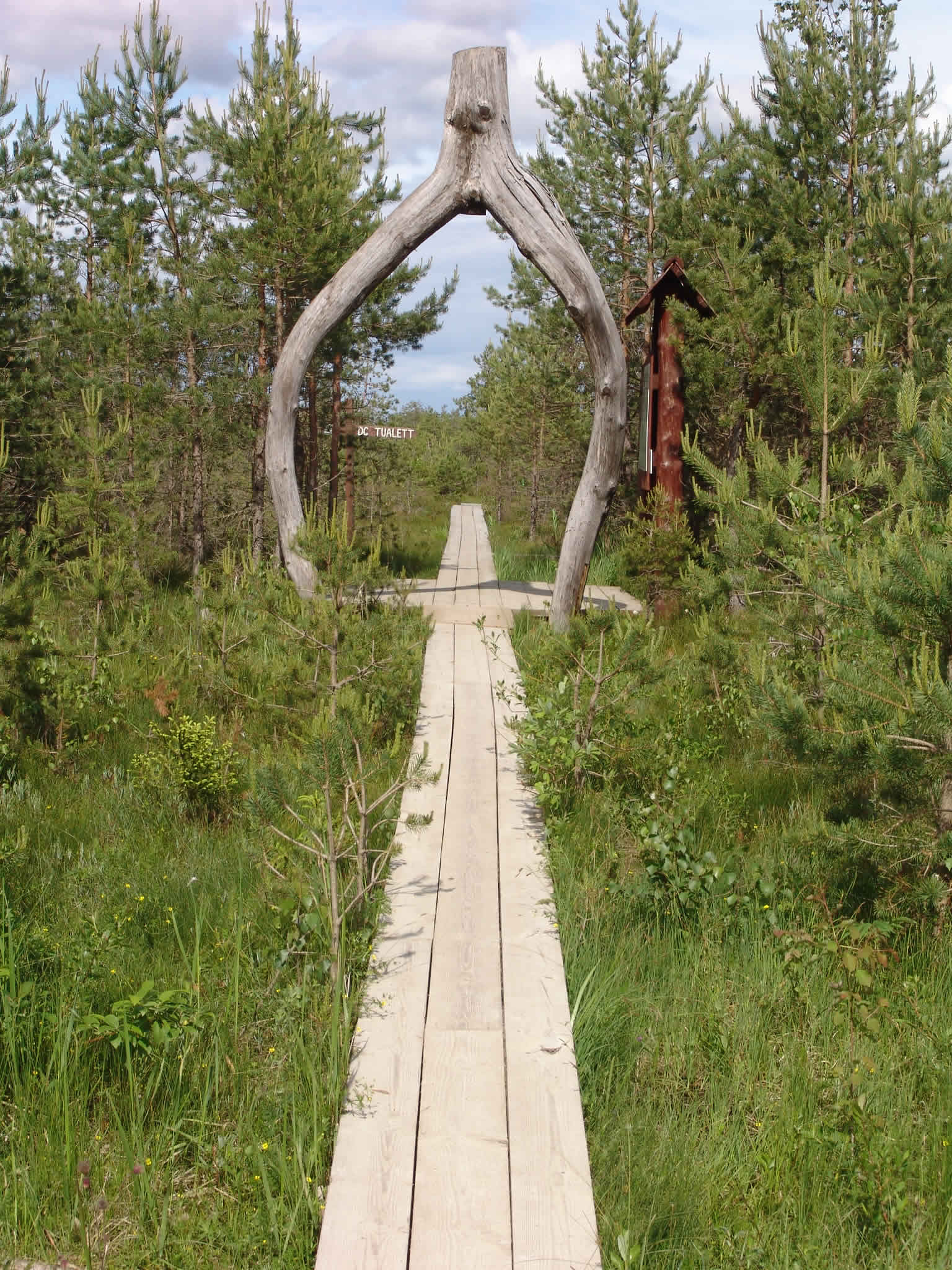
Boardwalk entrance to the Riisa hiking trail.

Hiking and study trails

There are several hiking and study trails, placed all over the National Park to explore the nature at its best:

- Riisa hiking trail: 5 km / ca 3 h / Riisa bog / watch tower /
- Ingatsi hiking trail: 4,5 km / ca 3 h / Kuresoo bog / watch tower /
- Beaver trail: 2 km / ca 1,5 h / Beaver habitat and paludified forest /
- Oksa track: 800 m / ca 45.min / culture heritage object and meadows /
- Kuuraniidu hiking trail: 1,2 km / ca 1.5 h / old forest habitat / watch tower /
- Mulgi meadow: camping site / flood plain grasslands / rich bird habitat /
- Tõramaa hiking trail: 2,5 km / ca 3 h / Halliste meadow, rich bird habitat / bird watchtower /
- Meiekose hiking trail: 2,8 km / ca 3 h / old cart road through abandoned Tõramaa village / semi natural habitats /
- Kuresoo hiking trail: 32 km / 2 days / various landscape and culture historical sites /
- Hüpassaare study trail: 5 km / 2,5 h / Kuresoo bog / semi-natural habitats / museum of Mart Saar
- Tipu study trail: 3 km / 2 h / culture historical sites / traditional rural landscape / semi-natural habitats

Tours

There are five seasons in Soomaa – spring, summer, autumn, winter and high-water season.

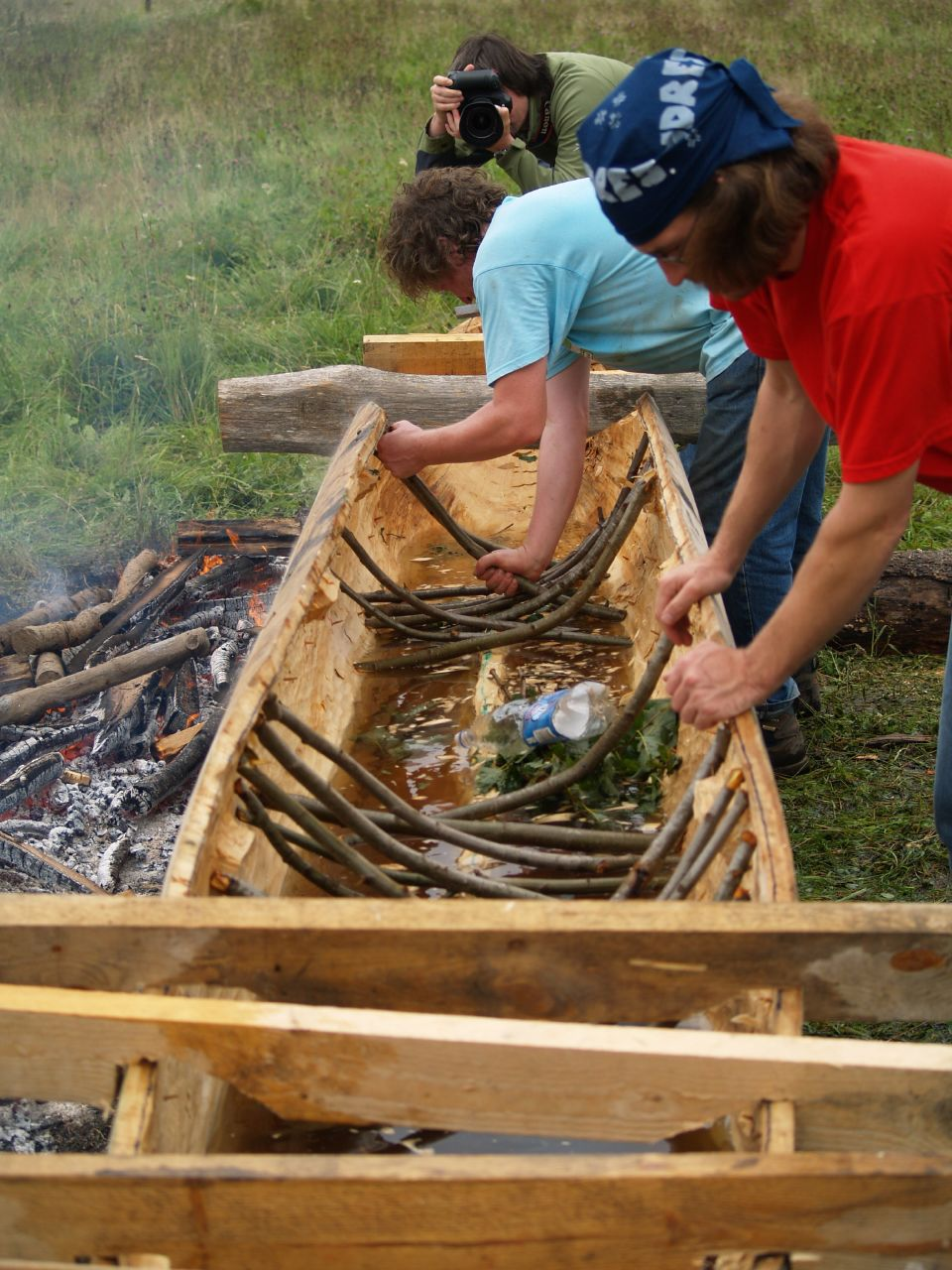
Building a dugout canoe.

Canoeing season lasts from April until October. Canoeing is a popular method of traversing Soomaa, although floods are common in the end of March or the beginning of April. Guided trip on traditional dugout canoes are also available, with log-boat building camps being organised in summer.

Bog walks can be undertaken in the area, walkways on wooden boards give visitors the opportunity to observe the special flora and fauna of the deep peat bogs.

In winter, when the whole wetland is frozen, snowshoe and sledge tours are organised over the frozen bogs and in the case of snow also cross-country skiing trips.

In the year 2009 Soomaa National Park was awarded by European Commission as a supreme nature holiday destination.

== See also ==
- Protected areas of Estonia
- List of national parks in the Baltics
- List of protected areas of Estonia
- List of Ramsar sites in Estonia
