= Sookuninga Nature Reserve =

Protected area in Estonia

- Location within Estonia
- Location: Estonia
- Nearest city: Pärnu
- Coordinates: 58°00′24″N 24°45′45″E
- Area: 5,869 ha (14,500 acres)

Ramsar Wetland
- Designated: 3 February 2006
- Reference no.: 1748

Sookuninga Nature Reserve is a nature reserve situated in south-western Estonia, in Pärnu County.

Sookuninga nature reserve is situated on the Latvian border of Estonia and comprises a large area of wetlands and woodlands. Sookuninga nature reserve and the Ziemeļu bogs protected area across the border together make out the North Livonian trans-boundary Ramsar protected wetland site. Together, the two sites form one of the largest natural peat bog areas in the Baltic states and constitute an important fresh-water reservoir. Sookuninga is home to many species, including large mammals like Gray wolf, Eurasian lynx and Brown bear. The site is furthermore a refuge for many unusual or threatened species of birds, including three species of eagle. Traditionally, the area has been sparsely populated due to its inaccessibility, and therefore also used as a hiding-place during times of war. Facilities for visitors include a bird-watching tower and a hiking trail.

== See also ==
- Protected areas of Estonia
- List of protected areas of Estonia
- List of Ramsar sites in Estonia
