= List of national parks in the Baltics =

This is a list of the national parks in the Baltic states of Estonia, Latvia, and Lithuania.

== Estonia ==
There are 6 national parks in Estonia.

Name	Region	Municipality	Established	Coordinates	Area	IUCN category
Alutaguse National Park	Eastern Estonia	Alutaguse Parish	2018	59°06′N 27°19′E	443.31 square kilometres (171.16 mi^{2})	
Karula National Park	Southern Estonia	Võru County	1993	57°42′52″N 26°29′12″E	123.64 square kilometres (47.74 mi^{2})	
Lahemaa National Park	Northern Estonia	Lääne-Viru County	1971	59°34′16″N 25°48′1″E	747.84 square kilometres (288.74 mi^{2})	
Matsalu National Park	Western Estonia	Lääne County	2004 (1957)	58°45′36″N 23°35′49″E	488.6 square kilometres (188.6 mi^{2})	
Soomaa National Park	South-western Estonia	Viljandi County	1993	58°26′27″N 25°6′20″E	398.44 square kilometres (153.84 mi^{2})	
Vilsandi National Park	Western Estonia	Saare County	1993	58°22′43″N 21°52′38″E	238.82 square kilometres (92.21 mi^{2})	

== Latvia ==
There are 4 national parks in Latvia.

Name	Region	Municipality	Established	Coordinates	Area	IUCN category
Gauja National Park	Vidzeme	Cēsis, Saulkrasti, Sigulda and Valmiera Municipality	1973	57°25′0″N 25°25′0″E	917.86 square kilometres (354.39 mi^{2})	II
Ķemeri National Park	Courland; Semigallia; Vidzeme	Jūrmala City, Jelgava, Mārupe and Tukums Municipality	1997	56°57′6″N 23°30′45″E	361.86 square kilometres (139.71 mi^{2})	II
Rāzna National Park	Latgale	Krāslava, Ludza and Rēzekne Municipality	2007	56°16′0″N 27°30′0″E	596.14 square kilometres (230.17 mi^{2})	II
Slītere National Park	Courland	Talsi Municipality	1999	57°37′27″N 22°17′40″E	163.66 square kilometres (63.19 mi^{2})	II

== Lithuania ==
There are 5 national parks in Lithuania. They were established in 1991 after Lithuania declared independence from the Soviet Union in 1990. Lithuanian SSR National Park established in 1974 was reorganized and renamed Aukštaitija National Park. Now they cover about 2.3 percent of Lithuania's territory.

Name	Region	Municipality	Established	Coordinates	Area	IUCN category
Aukštaitija National Park	Aukštaitija	Ignalina, Utena, and Švenčionys district municipality	1974	55°20′38″N 26°3′25″E	410.56 square kilometres (158.52 mi^{2})	II
Dzūkija National Park	Dzūkija	Varėna district municipality	1991	54°4′55″N 24°22′36″E	584.53 square kilometres (225.69 mi^{2})	II
Curonian Spit National Park	Lithuania Minor	Neringa municipality	1991	55°28′51.6″N 21°5′49.2″E	273.89 square kilometres (105.75 mi^{2})	II
Trakai National Historic Park	Dzūkija	Trakai district municipality	1991	54°38′20″N 24°25′8″E	81.49 square kilometres (31.46 mi^{2})	II
Žemaitija National Park	Samogitia (Žemaitija)	Plungė district municipality	1991	56°2′38″N 21°53′20″E	217.54 square kilometres (83.99 mi^{2})	II

== See also ==
- Geography of Estonia
- Geography of Latvia
- Geography of Lithuania
- Protected areas of Estonia
- List of protected areas of Latvia
- List of protected areas of Lithuania
