= Karula National Park =

National park in southern Estonia

Kalia Rout
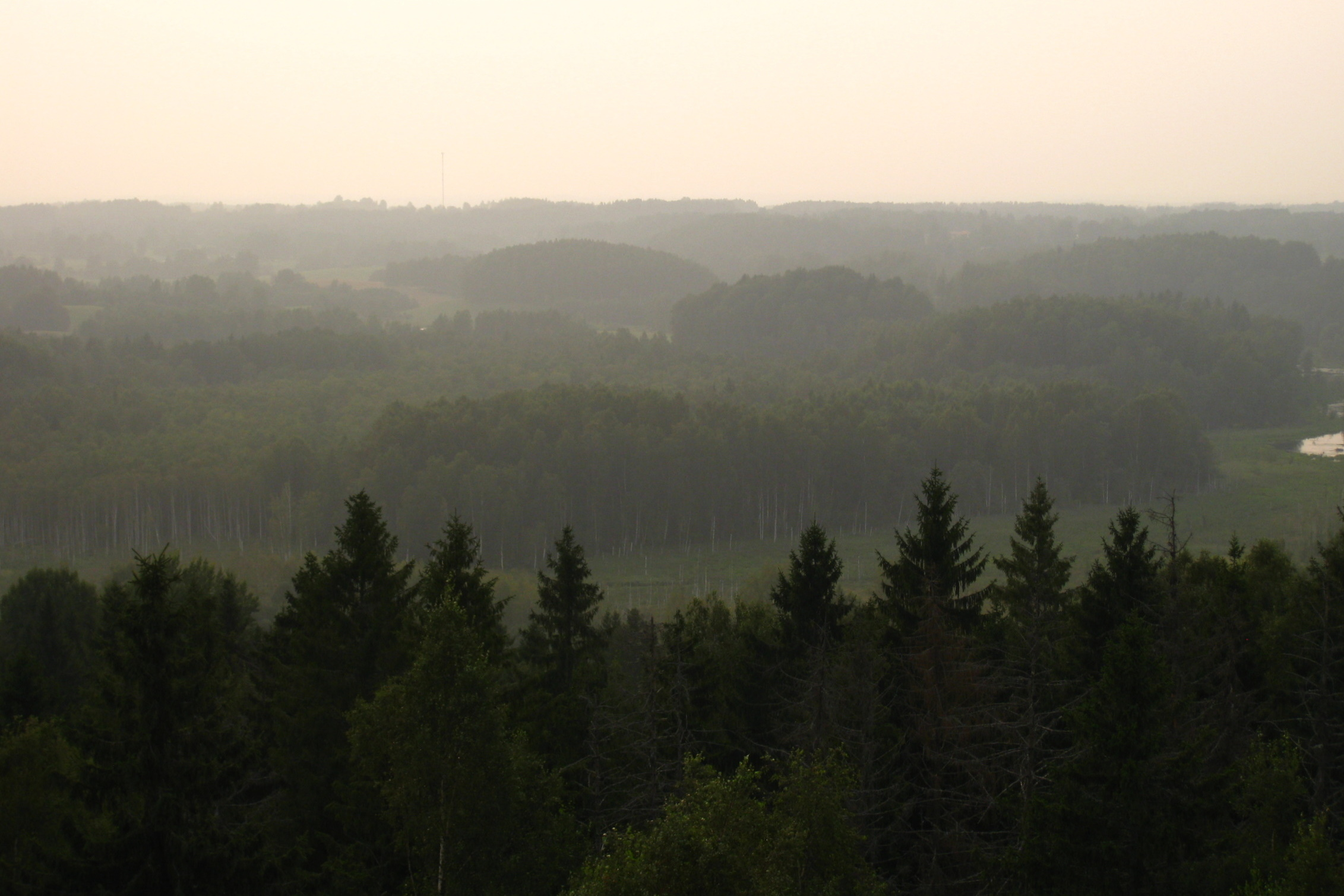
- Karula National Park

- Location within Estonia
- Location: Estonia
- Coordinates: 57°42′52″N 26°29′12″E
- Area: 123.64 km^{2} (47.74 sq mi)
- Established: 1979
- Website: www.karularahvuspark.ee

Karula National Park is a national park in southern Estonia. It was established in 1979 as a protected area and in 1993 became a national park. It is the smallest national park in Estonia.

The park is located in Antsla and Rõuge parishes in Võru County and Valga Parish in Valga County. The park covers almost a third of the Karula Uplands and is characterised by its hilly topography, many lakes, great biodiversity and traditional cultural landscape. The flora of the national park is rich and includes several species red-listed in Estonia, such as the Baltic orchid, mezereon and the daisyleaf grape fern; the last is only found in three locations in Estonia and Karula is one of them. The fauna also includes unusual and threatened species, such as pond bat, lesser spotted eagle and black stork. Mammals such as elk, Eurasian lynx and European polecat are common.

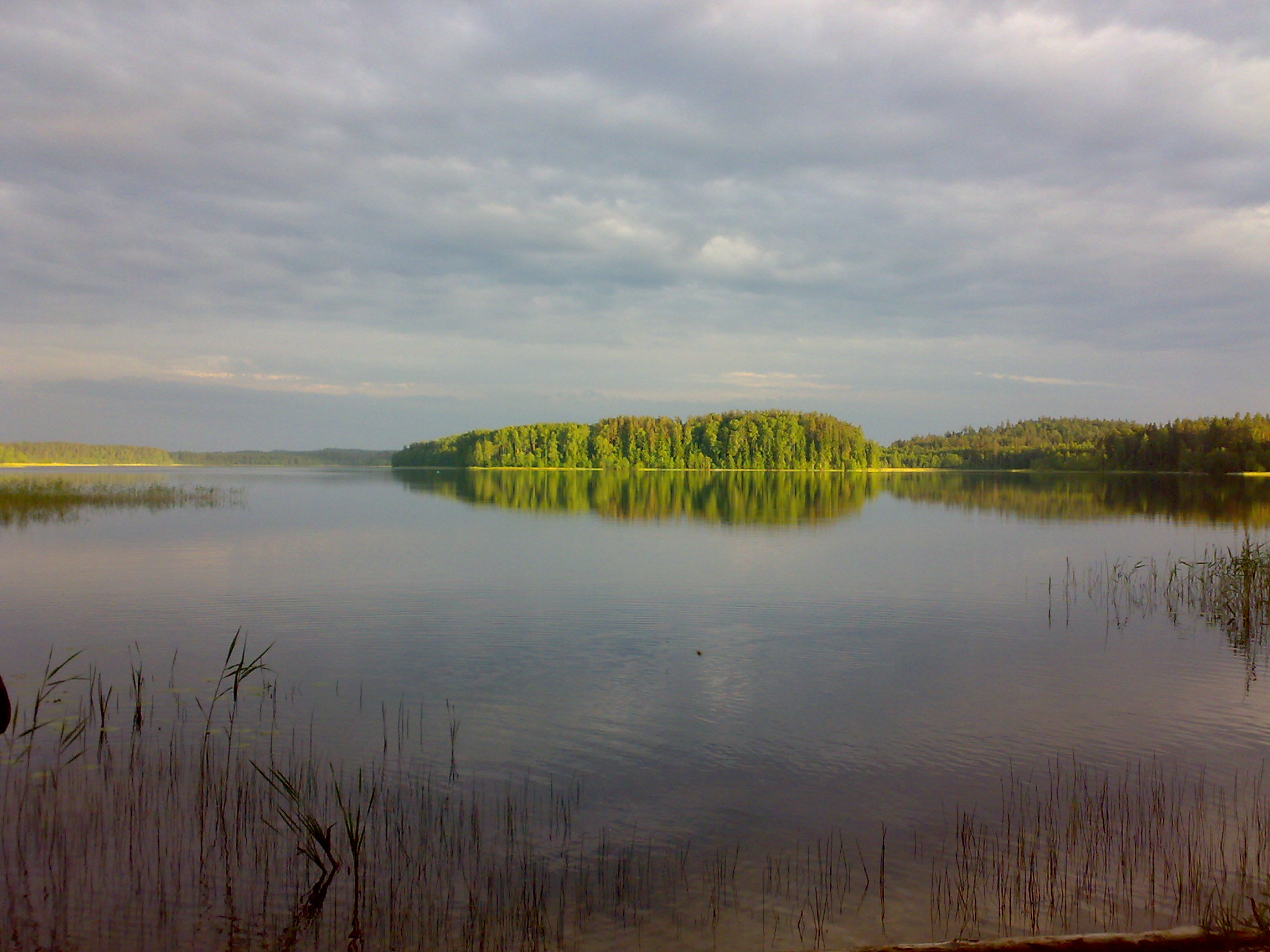

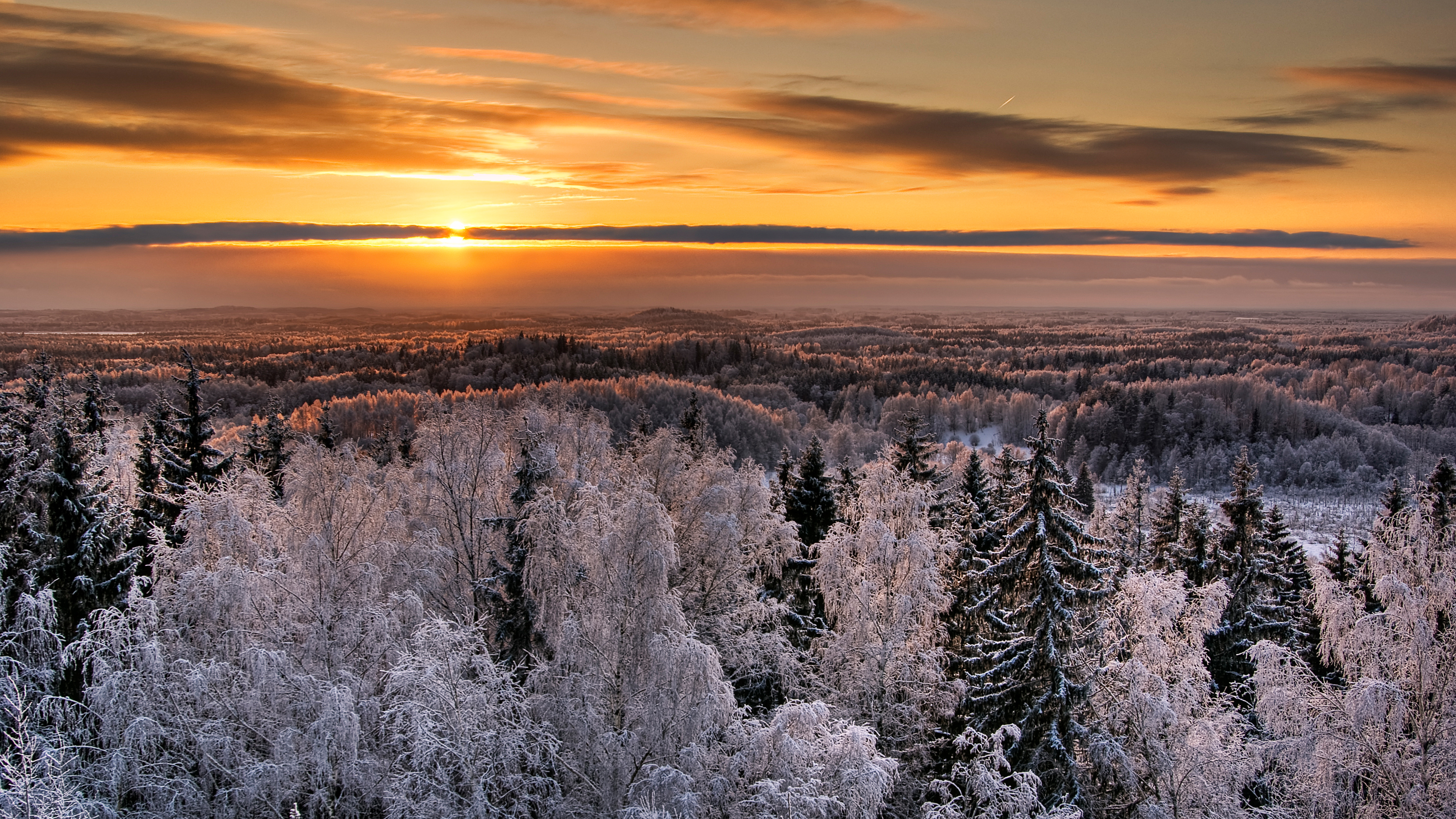

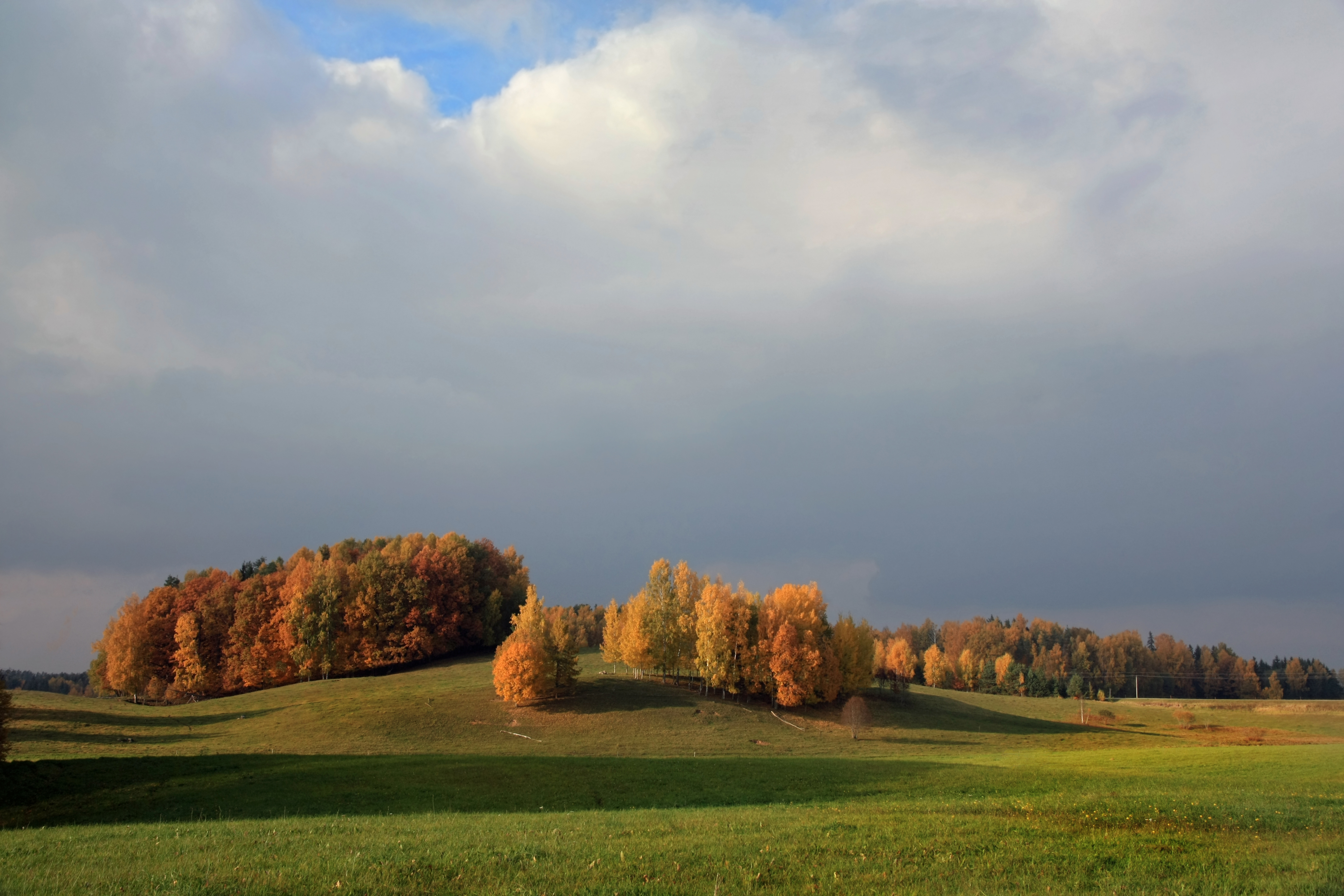

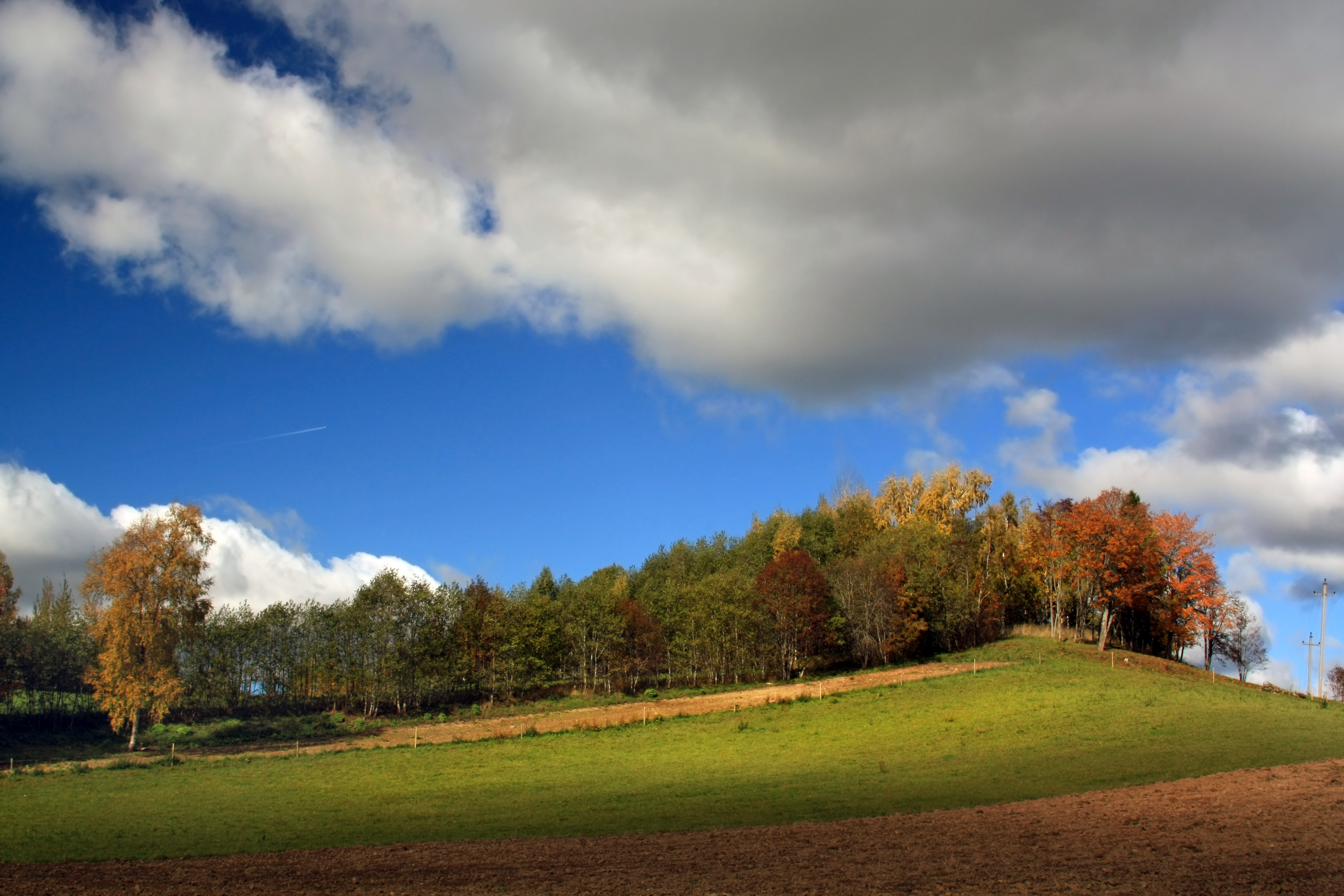

== See also ==
- Protected areas of Estonia
- List of national parks in the Baltics
