= Endla Nature Reserve =

Protected area in Estonia

- Endla looduskaitseala
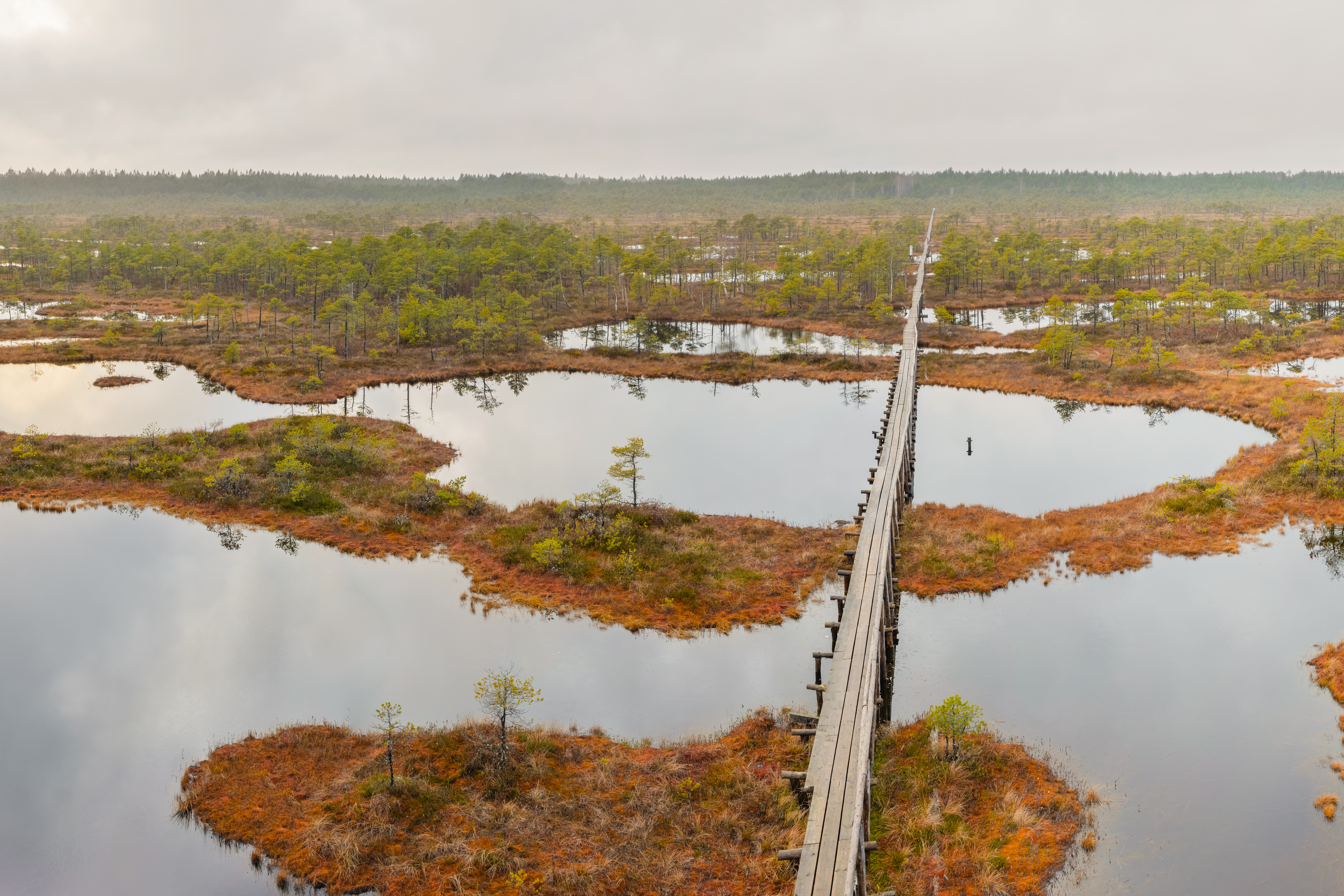

- Location within Estonia
- Location: Estonia
- Nearest city: Jõgeva
- Coordinates: 58°52′47″N 26°08′25″E
- Area: 10,110 ha (25,000 acres)
- Established: 1985

Endla Nature Reserve is a nature reserve situated in central Estonia.

Drone video of Endla Nature Reserv. Spring 2023

The Endla nature reserve protects a fresh-water system of mires, bogs, springs and rivulets. As such, it plays an important role in recharging the waters of the Põltsamaa River. The flora is dominated by pine shrubs and reed beds. Several threatened species of orchid can be found in the nature reserve. Rare or threatened birds also use the area as breeding ground. Facilities for visitors include a visitors' centre, towers for bird watching and nature trails.

== Gallery ==
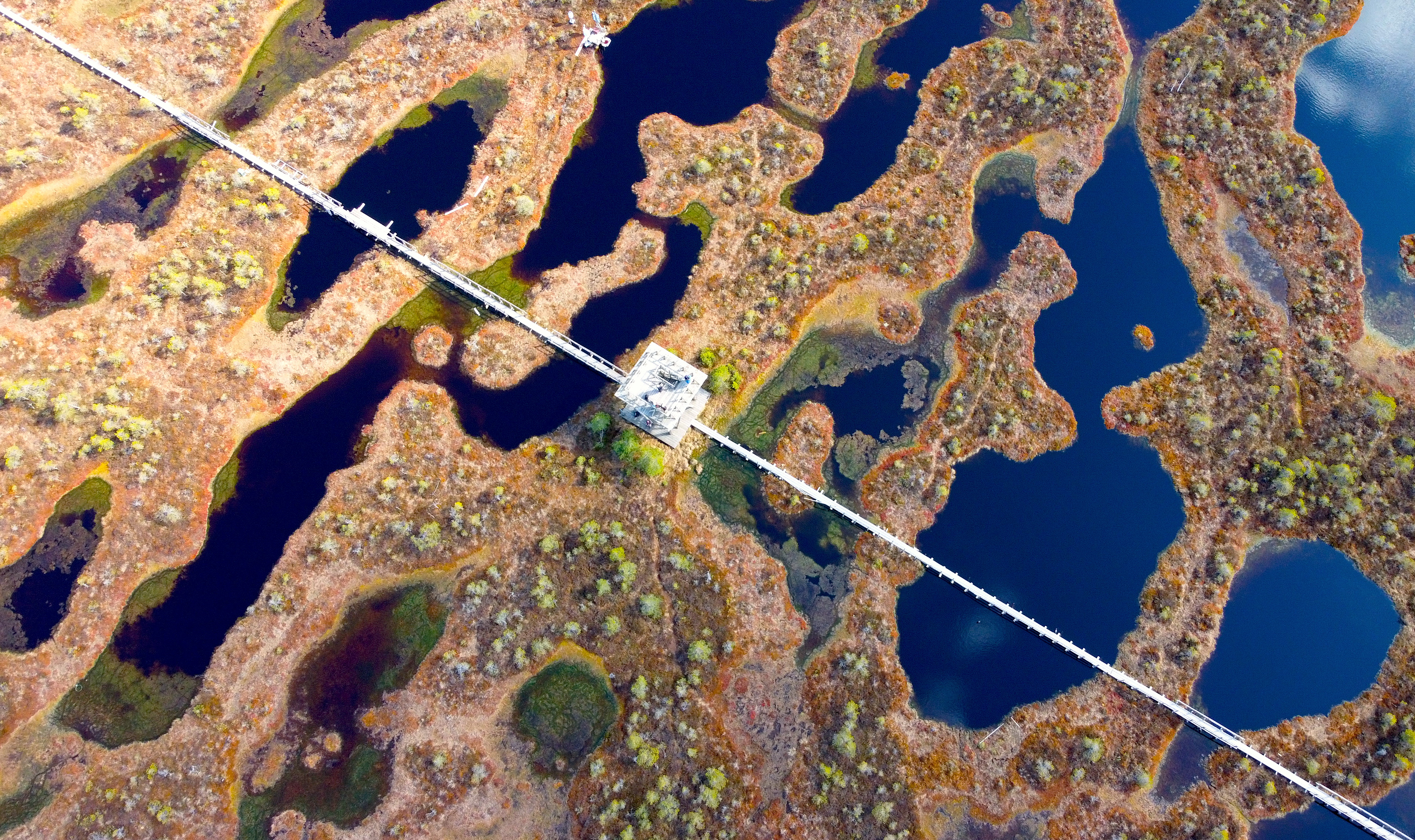
Endla nature reserve, boardwalk and observation tower in Jõgevamaa, Estonia (spring 2023)

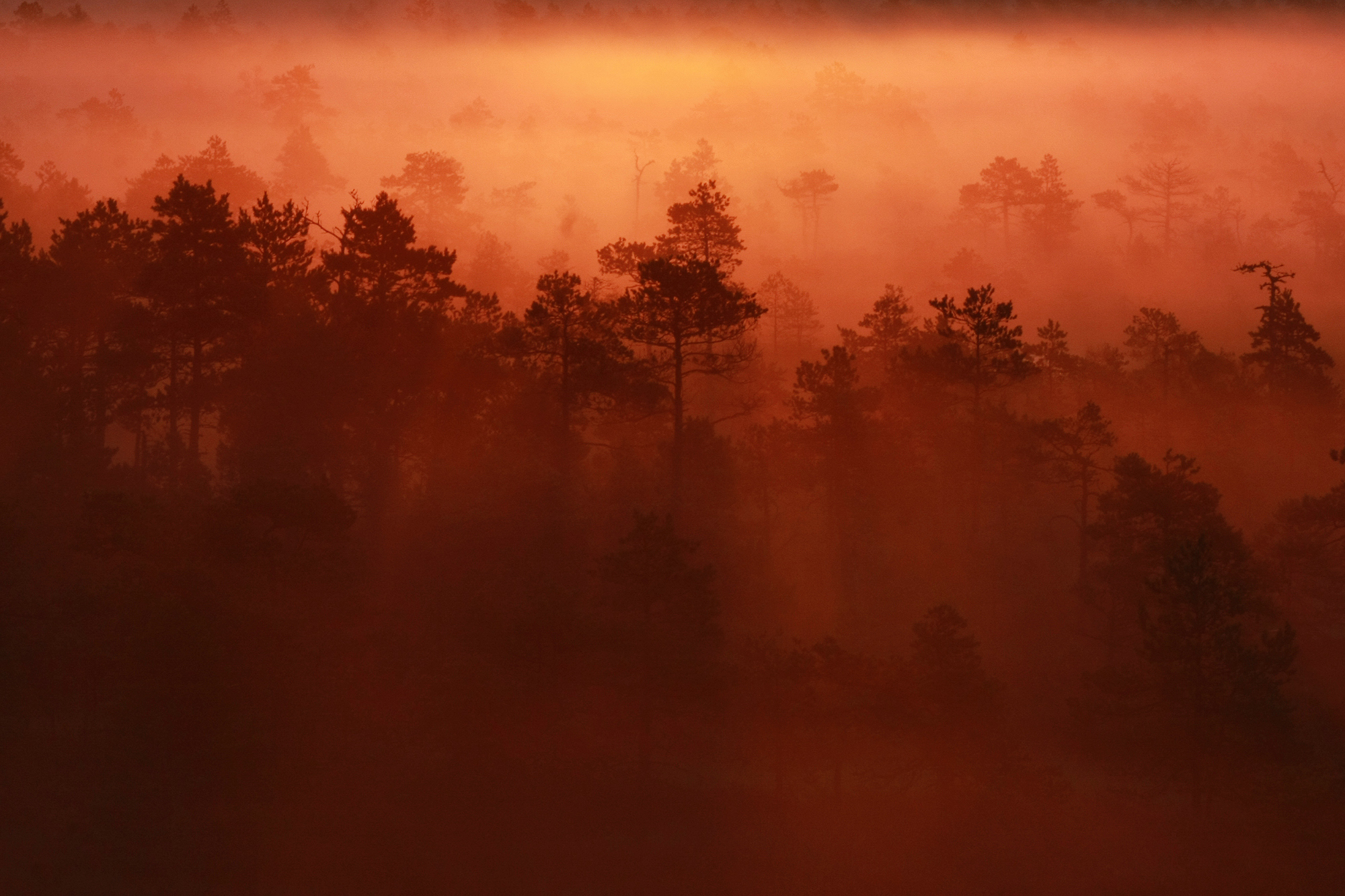
Männikjärve bog

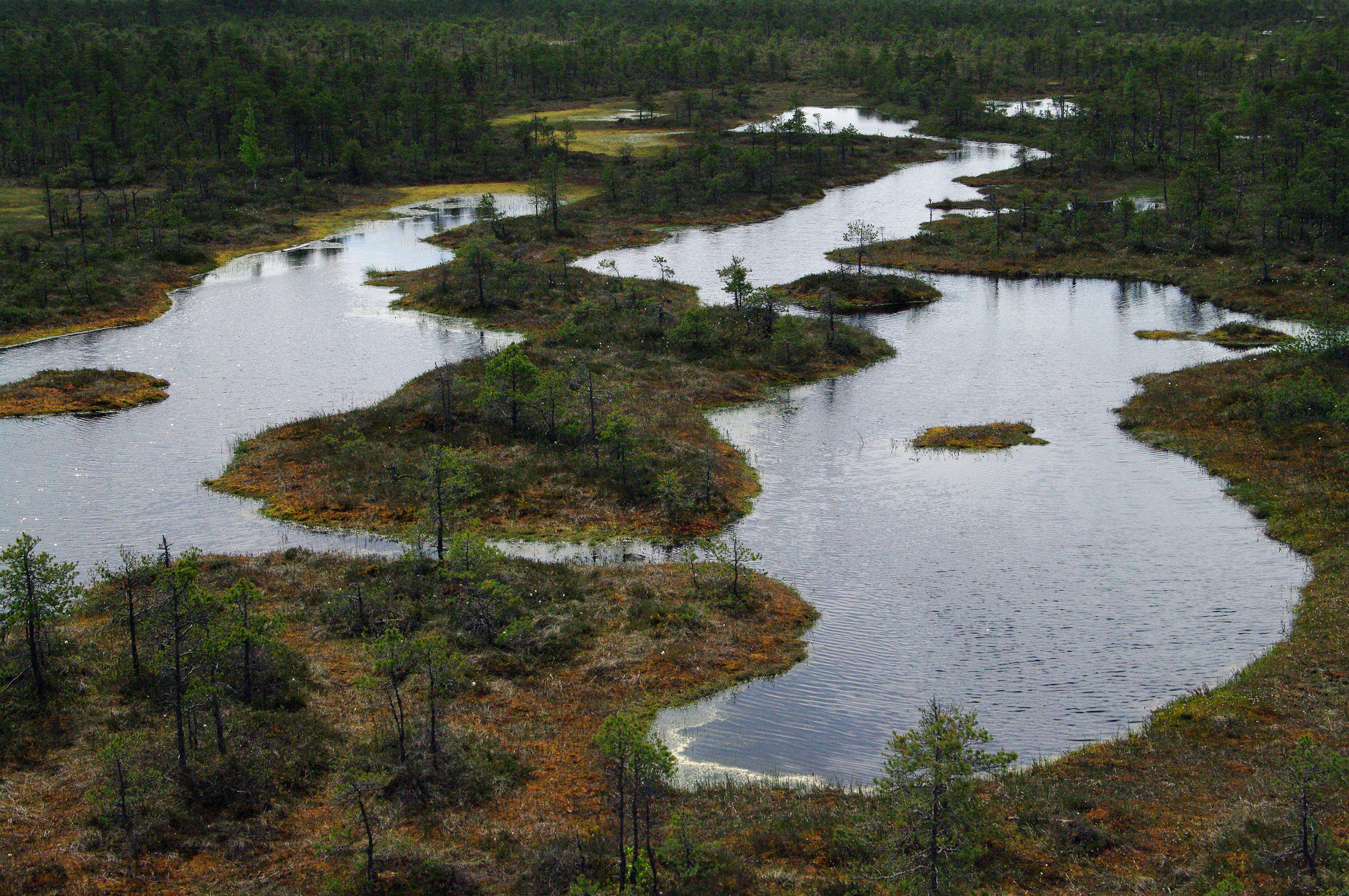
View of Männikjärve bog from the south tower

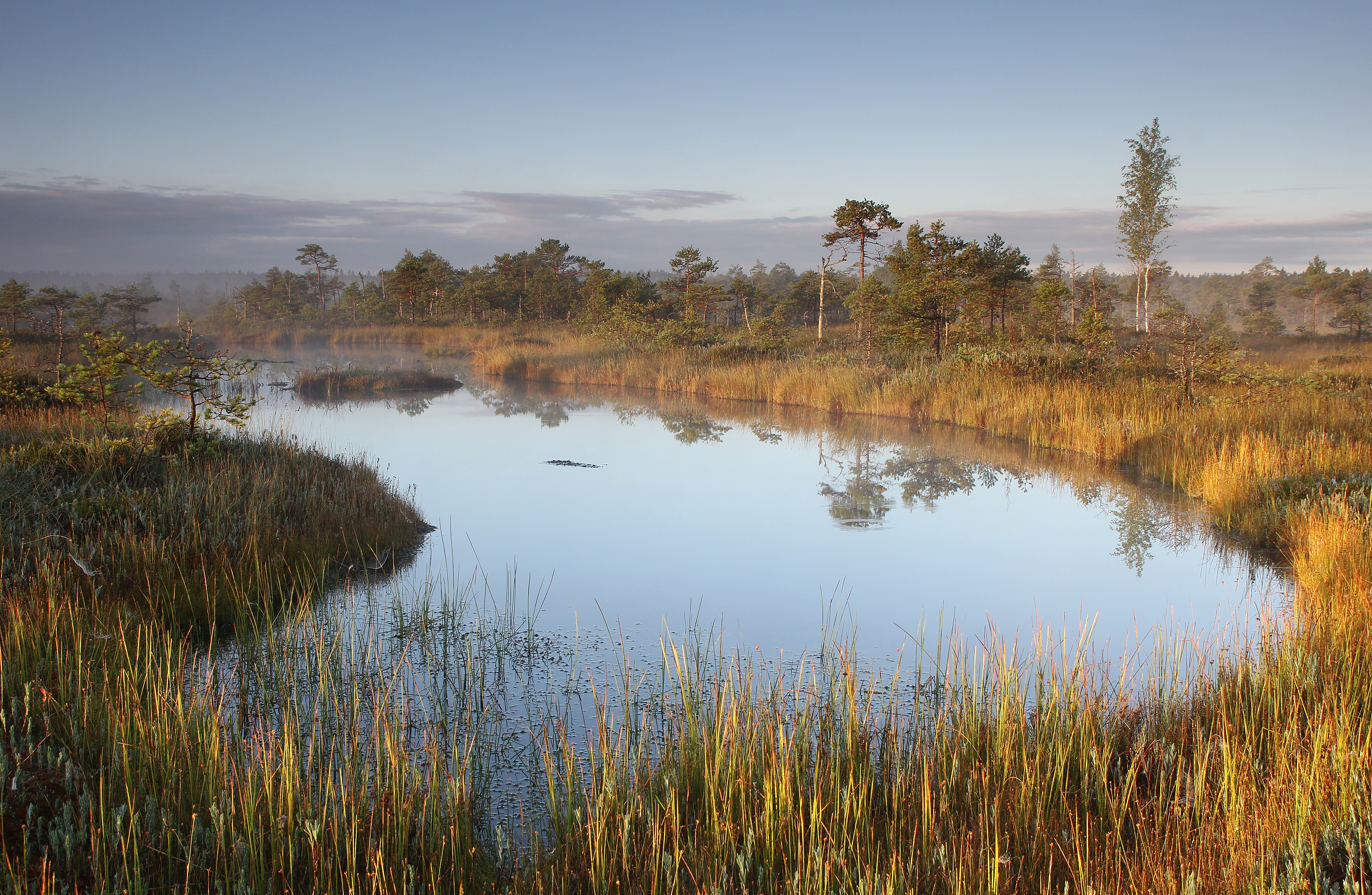
Early morning in Endla

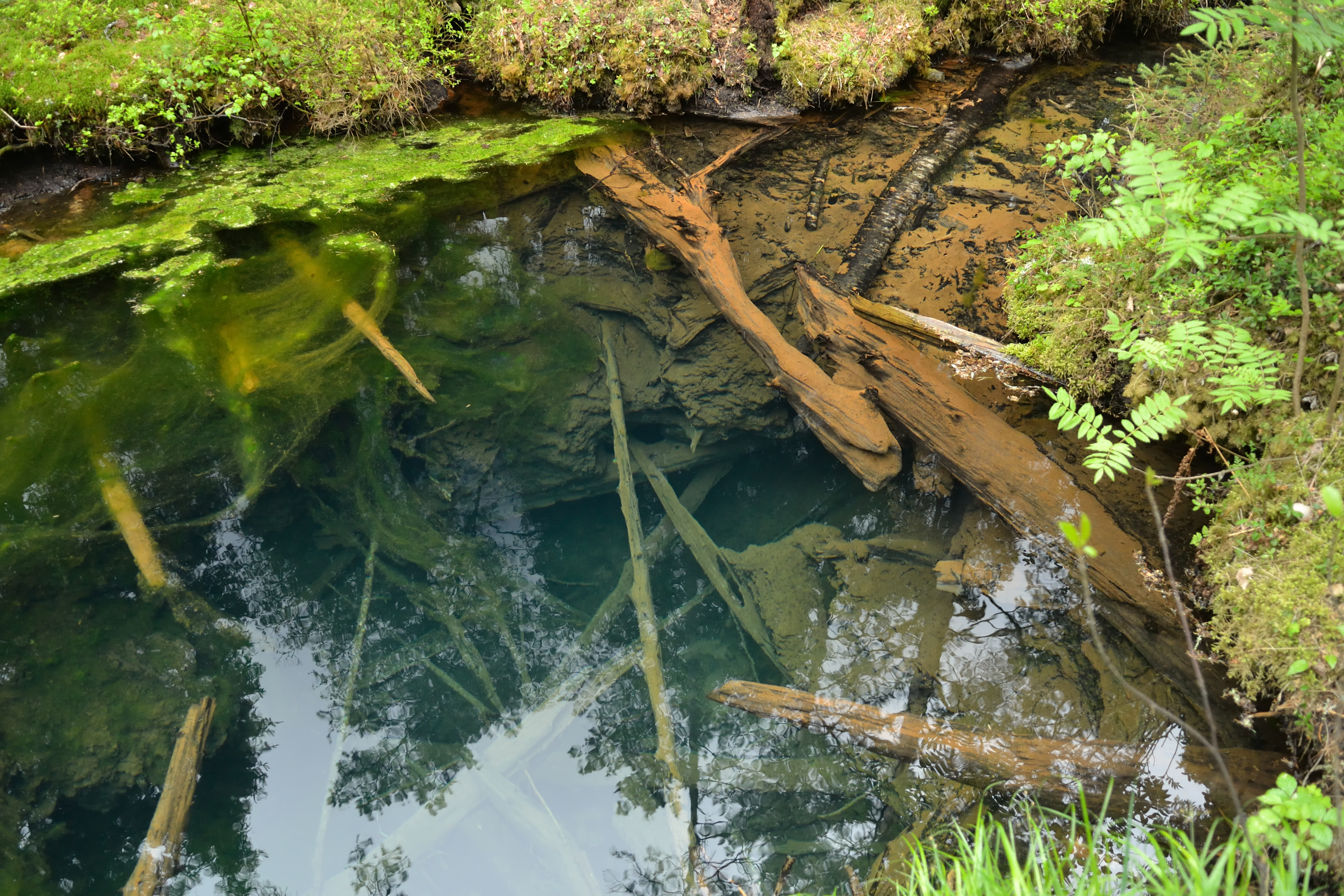
Sopa spring

== See also ==
- Protected areas of Estonia
- List of protected areas of Estonia
- List of Ramsar sites in Estonia
