= Leidissoo Nature Reserve =

Protected area in Estonia

- Leidissoo looduskaitseala
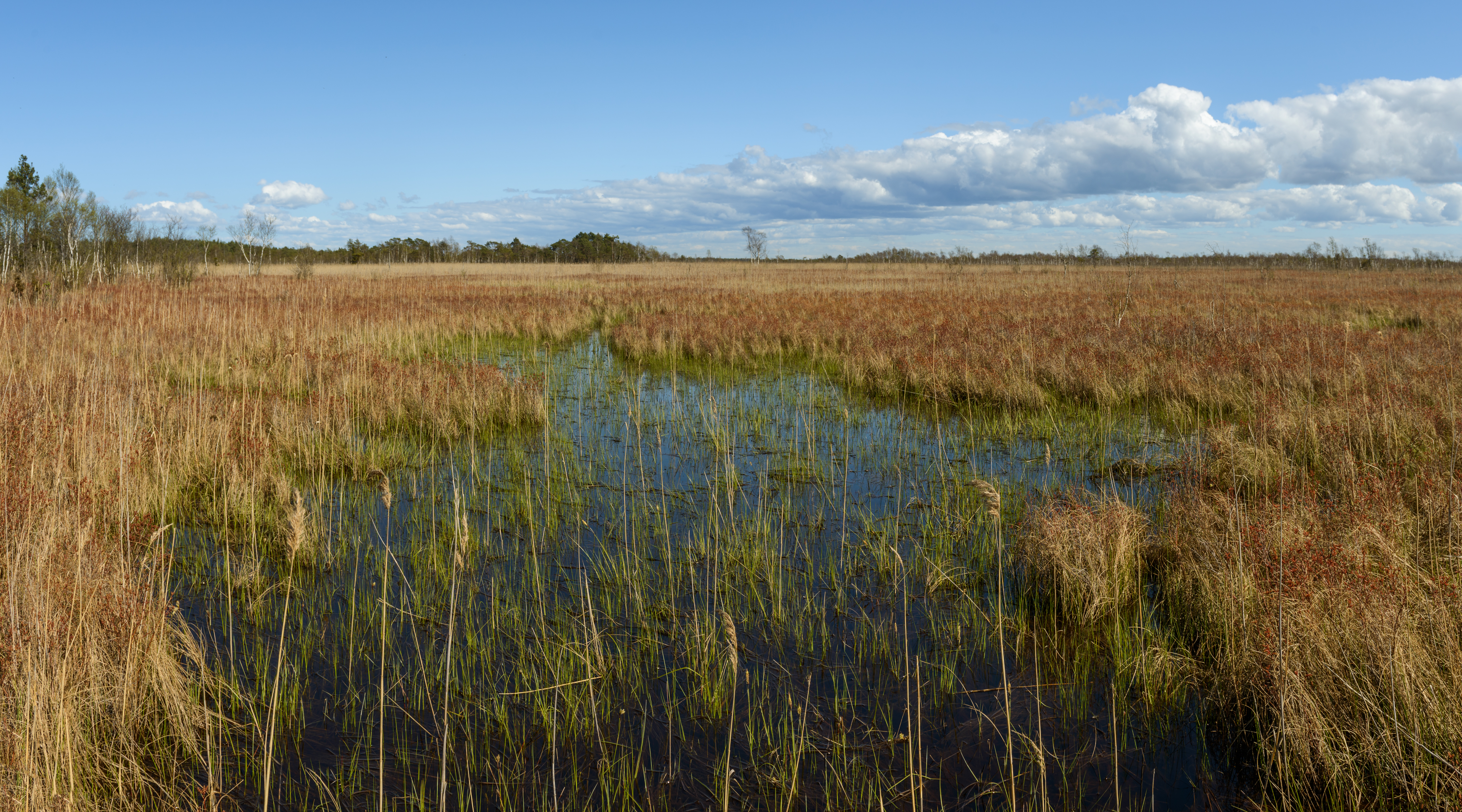

- Location within Estonia
- Location: Estonia
- Coordinates: 59.10°N 23.75°E
- Area: 8,221 ha (20,310 acres)
- Established: 2005

Ramsar Wetland
- Official name: Leidissoo
- Reference no.: 1998

Leidissoo Nature Reserve is a nature reserve situated in Lääne County, Estonia. Since 2010, this nature reserve belongs to Ramsar sites.

The area of the nature reserve is 8221 ha.
