= Lihula Landscape Conservation Area =

Protected area in Estonia

- Lihula maastikukaitseala
- Location within Estonia
- Location: Estonia
- Coordinates: 58°40′N 23°57′E
- Area: 6,654 ha (16,440 acres)
- Established: 2016

Ramsar Wetland
- Official name: Lihula
- Designated: 2010
- Reference no.: 1997

Lihula Landscape Conservation Area is a protected area situated in Lääne County, Estonia. Since 2010, this area belongs to Ramsar sites.

Its area is 6654 ha.
