= Kudani =

Village in Estonia

Coordinates: 59°03′N 23°31′E

- Village
- Interactive map of Kudani
- Country: Estonia
- County: Lääne County
- Parish: Lääne-Nigula Parish

Population
  - Total: 13
- Time zone: UTC+2 (EET)
  - Summer (DST): UTC+3 (EEST)

Kudani (Swedish: Gutanäs) is a village in Lääne-Nigula Parish, Lääne County, in western Estonia.
