= Haapsalu-Noarootsi Wetland Complex =

Wetland complex in Estonia

- Location within Estonia
- Location: Estonia
- Coordinates: 59°08′N 23°27′E
- Area: 27,450 ha (67,800 acres)
- Established: 2011

Ramsar Wetland
- Designated: 2011
- Reference no.: 2022

Haapsalu-Noarootsi Wetland Complex (Estonian: Haapsalu-Noarootsi märgala) is a wetland complex in Lääne County, Estonia. Since 2011, this complex belongs to Ramsar sites.

The area of the complex is 27,450 ha. It also includes Osmussaar Landscape Conservation Area. This complex is important wintering, staging, moulting and breeding site for 225 different bird species.
