= Muraka Nature Reserve =

Protected area in Estonia

- Muraka looduskaitseala
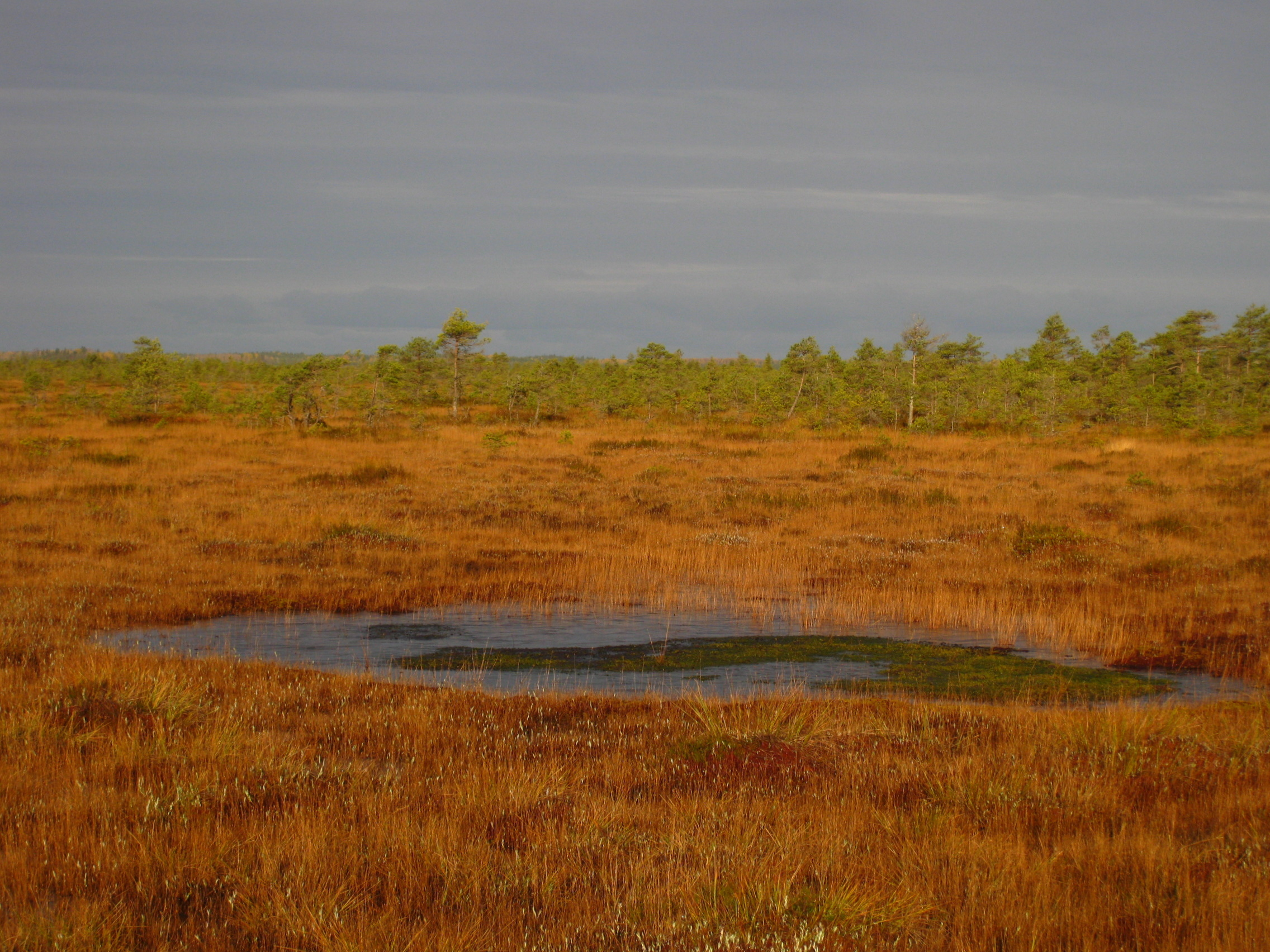

- Location within Estonia
- Location: Estonia
- Nearest city: Jõhvi
- Coordinates: 59°08′N 27°06′E
- Area: 13,980 ha (34,500 acres)

Muraka Nature Reserve is a nature reserve situated in eastern Estonia, in Ida-Viru County.

The history of the nature reserve goes back to 1938, when a protected area was designated in the area in an effort to protect nesting eagles in the area. The nature reserve is characterised by its wetlands; several large bogs are surrounded by mires, swamps, fens and rivulets. In addition, there are also areas of unspoilt forest. The nature reserve is one of few remaining wilderness areas in north-east Estonia.

The nature reserve is an important refuge for several species of animals. The peregrine falcon, otherwise rarely seen regularly in Estonia, can often be seen there. The Siberian flying squirrel, Cucujus cinnaberinus and Boros schnederi are also present. In nearby Oonurme village, a small permanent exhibition about the nature reserve is on display in the community centre. In the nature reserve itself, trails have also been prepared for interested visitors.

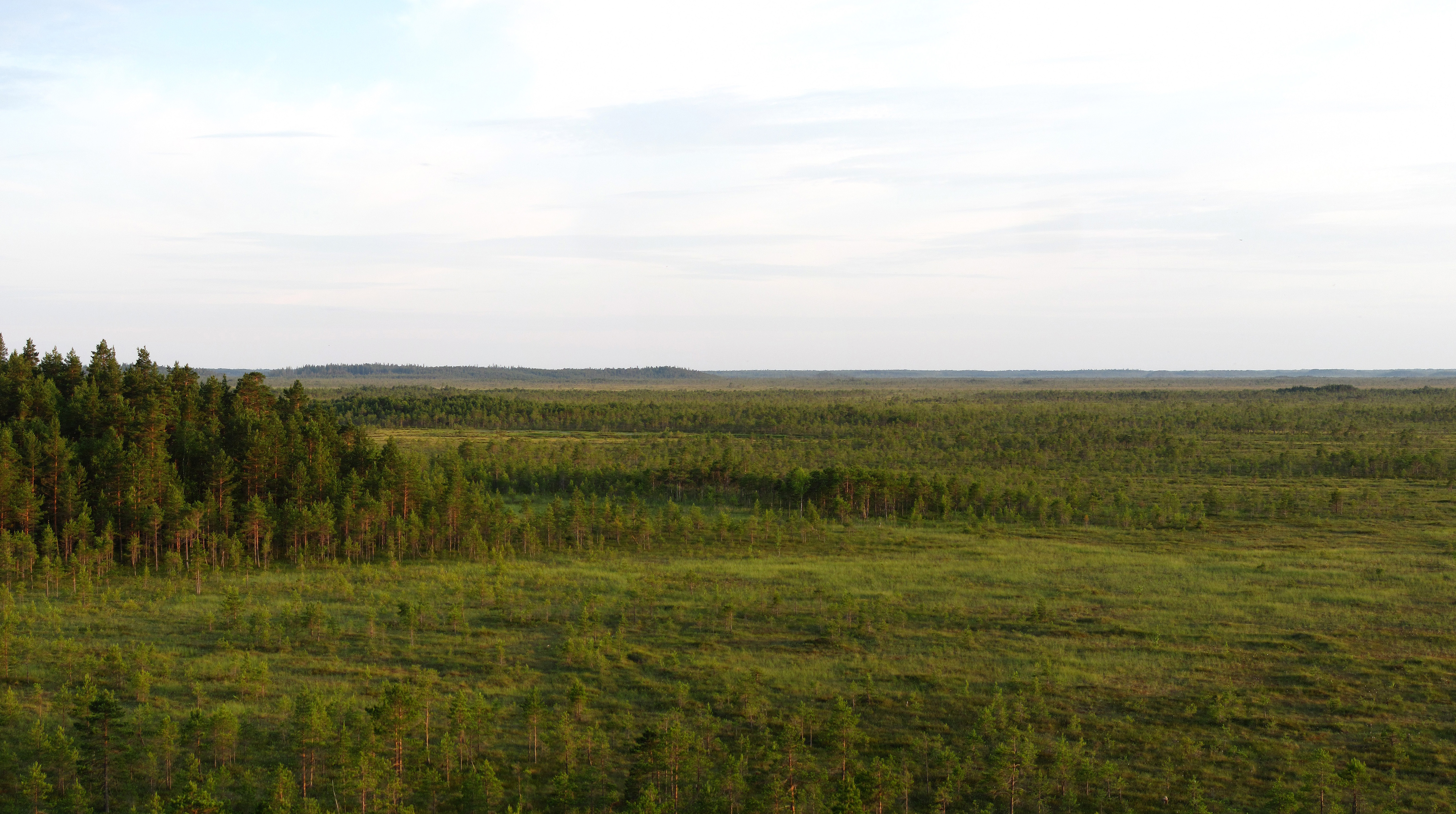
Muraka bog

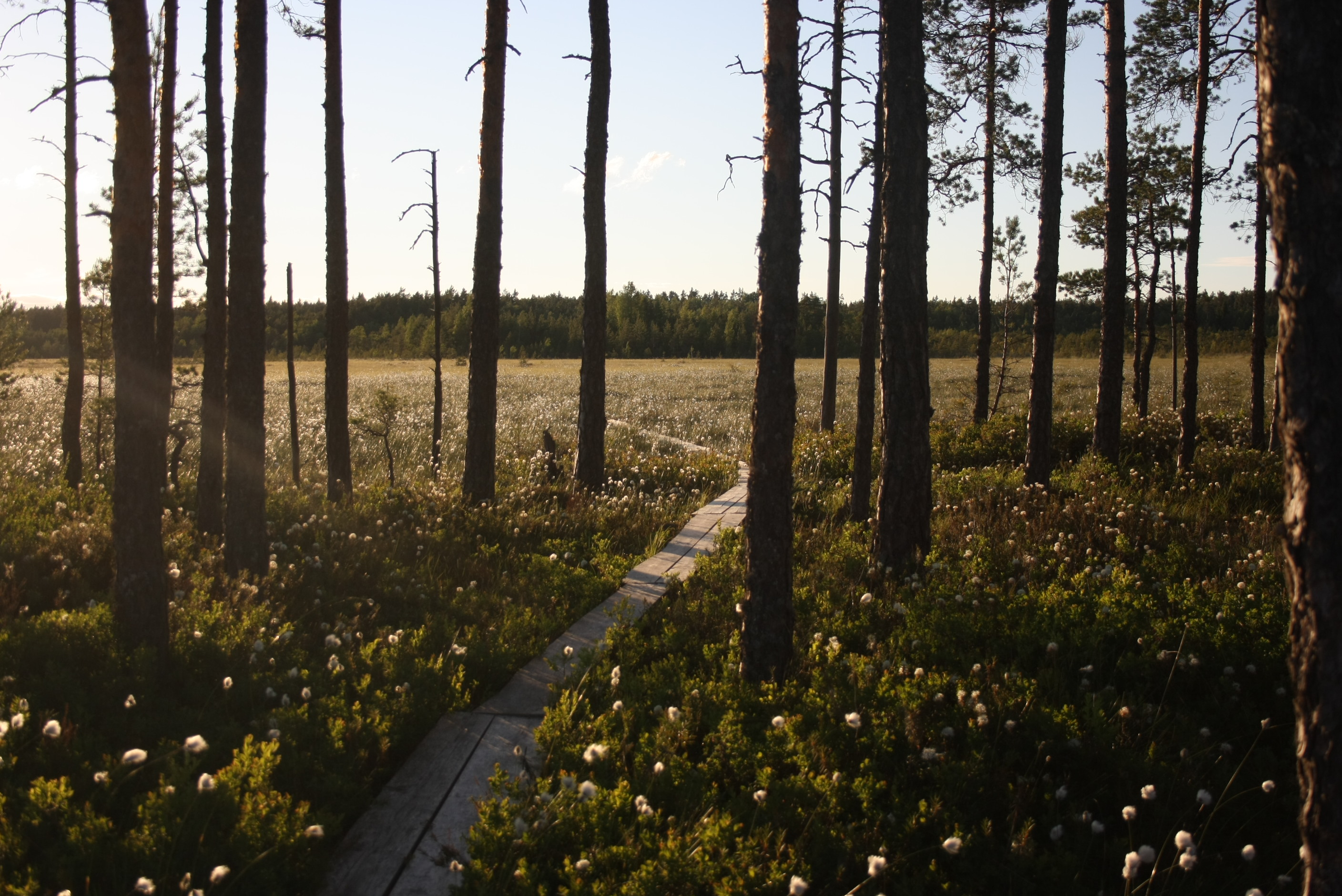
Rüütli bog

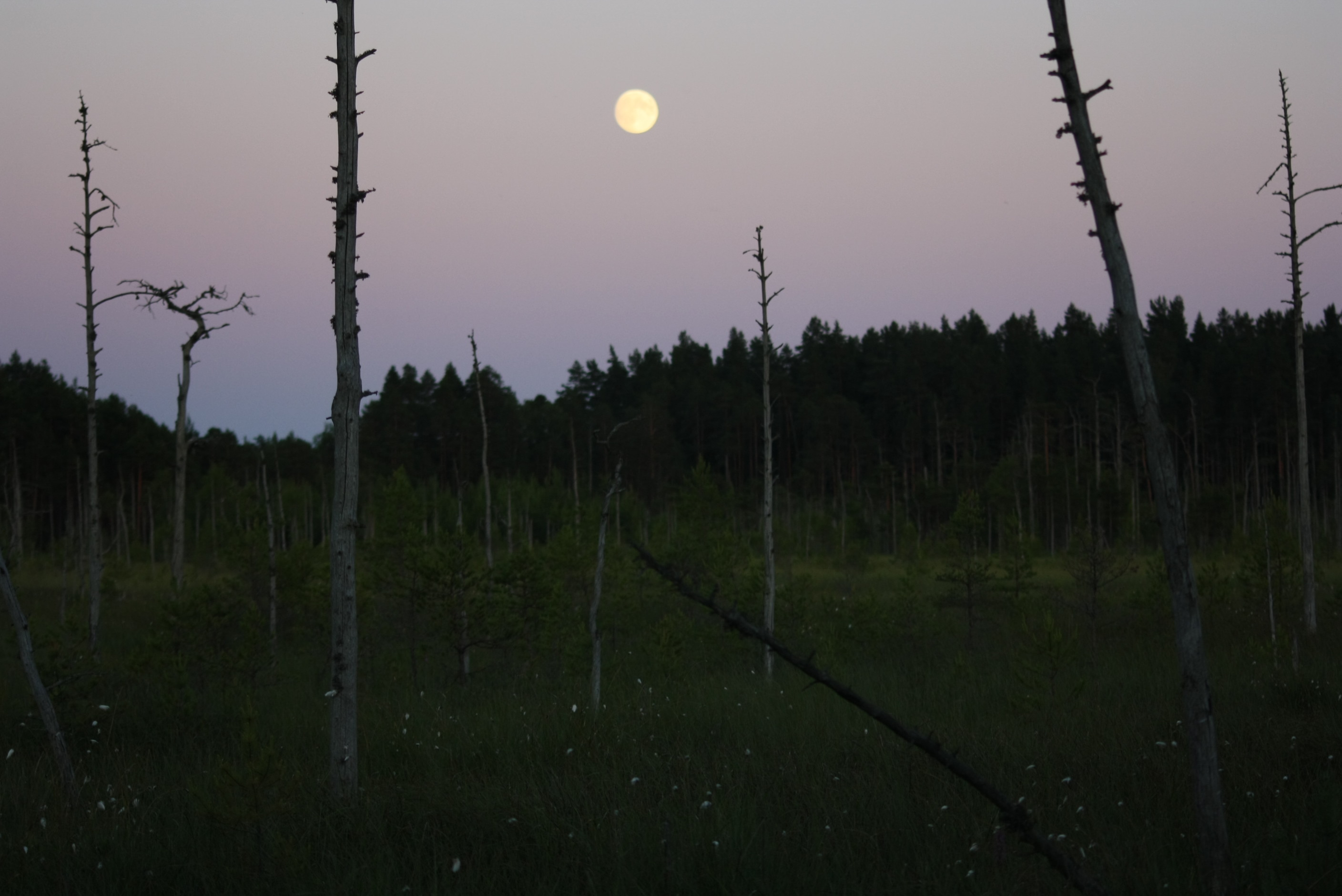
Rüütli bog
