= Protected areas of Estonia =

Protected areas of Estonia are regulated by the Nature Conservation Act (Estonian: Looduskaitseseadus), which was passed by the Estonian parliament on April 21, 2004, and entered into force May 10, 2004. Overall Estonia has 15403 protected areas covering 21% of the country land and 18% of its marine and coastal territory, including 6 national parks: Lahemaa National Park, Karula National Park, Soomaa National Park, Vilsandi National Park, Matsalu National Park, and Alutaguse National Park

== Protected areas ==
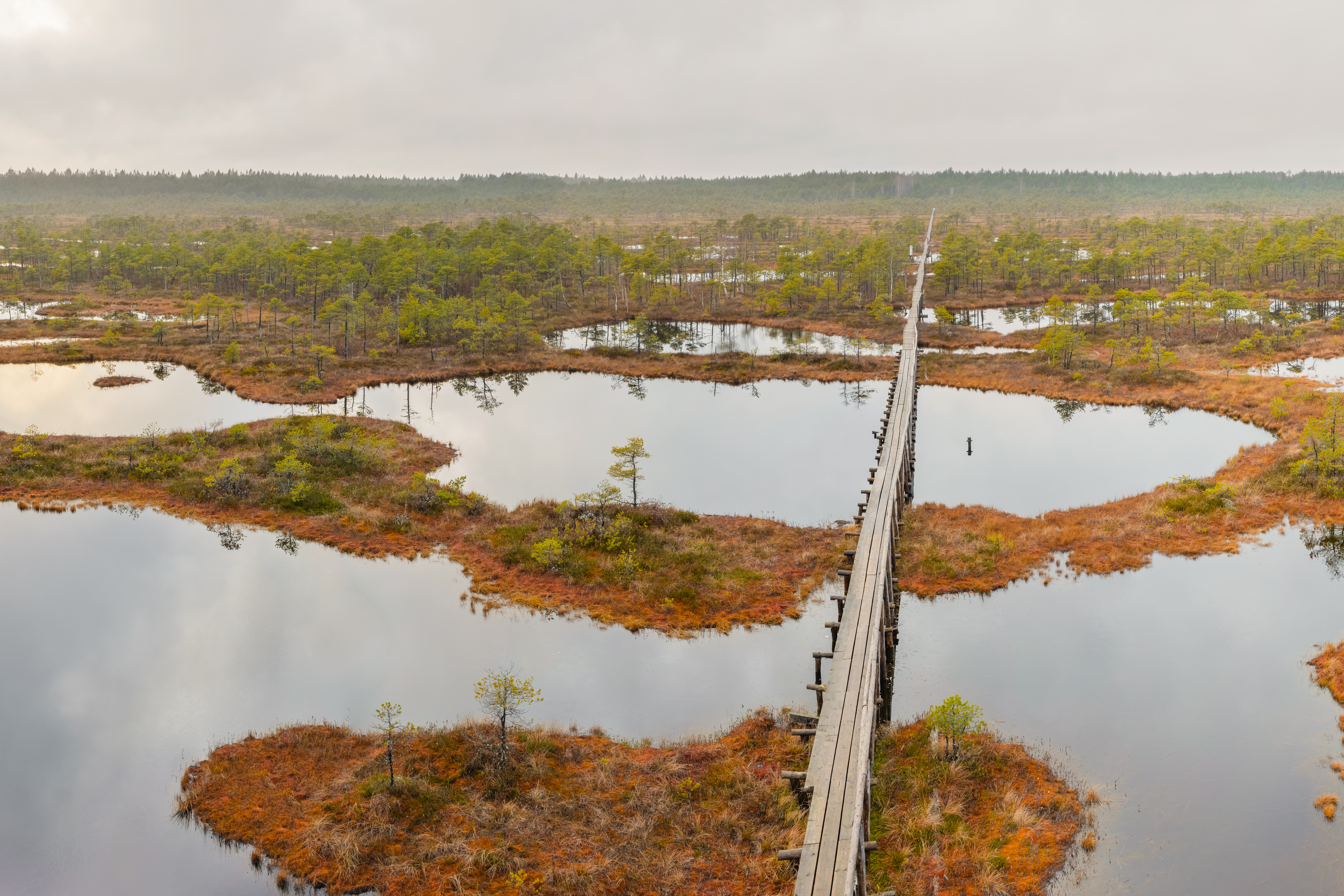
Endla Nature Reserve

As stated in §10.1: An area shall be placed under protection as a protected area or a special conservation area by a regulation of the Government of the Republic. According to the law, protected areas are areas maintained in a state unaltered by human activity or used subject to special requirements where the natural environment is preserved, protected, restored, researched or introduced. There are three types of protected areas; National parks, Nature conservation areas and Landscape conservation areas (nature parks).

The law declares the following three special protection areas, which are designated for the conservation of habitats, for the preservation of which the impact of planned activities is estimated and activities liable to damage the favourable conservation status of the habitats are prohibited: Strict nature reserve (§ 29), Special management zone (§ 30) and Limited management zone (§ 31)

In the time of the Estonian SSR, there were only five protected areas categorized as zapovedniks ("scientific nature reserve"): Vilsandi, Viidumäe, Endla, Nigula and Matsalu.

=== National parks ===
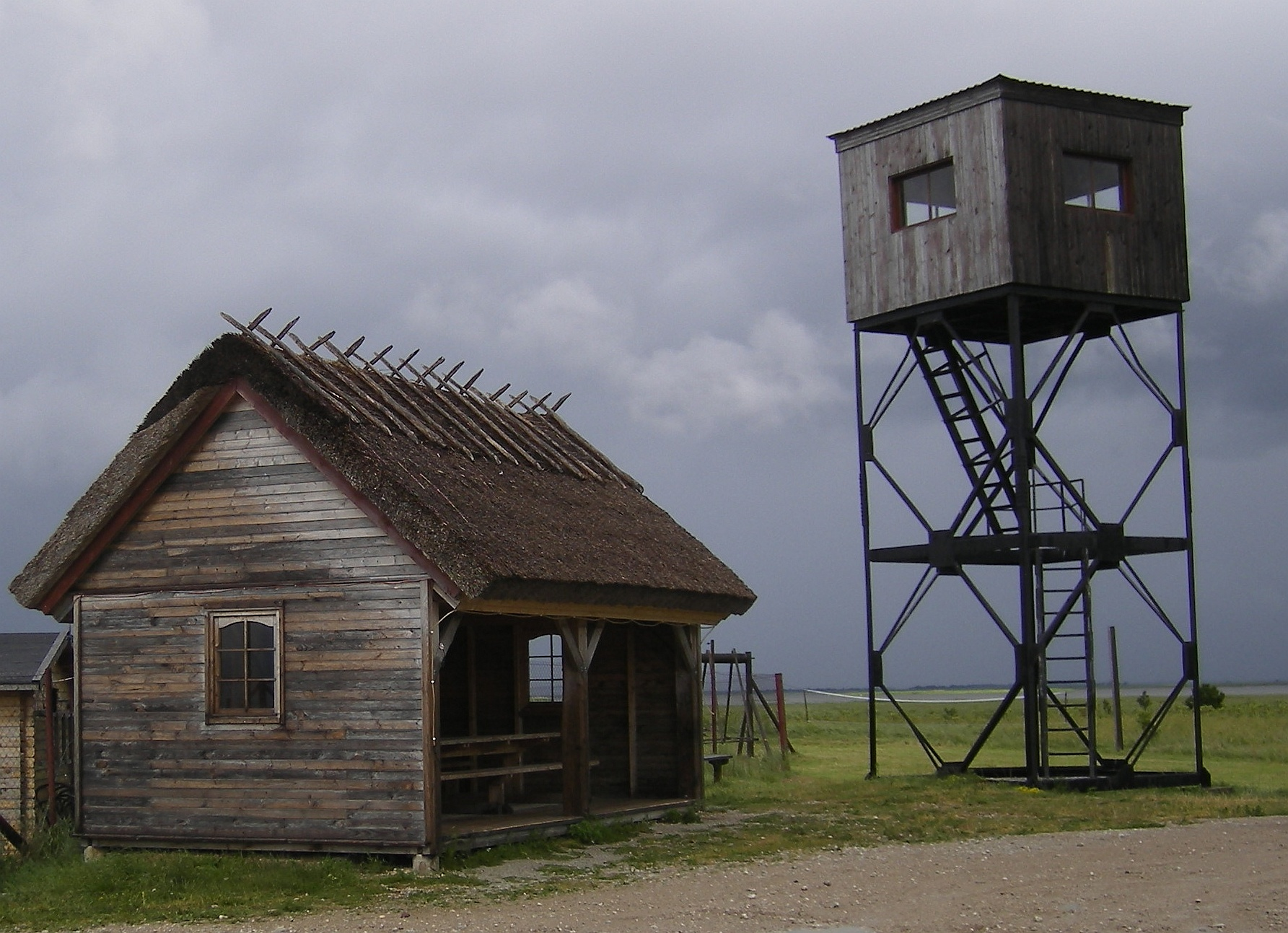
Keemu bird watching tower in Matsalu National Park

A national park is a protected area prescribed for the preservation, protection, restoration, research and introduction of the natural environment, landscapes, cultural heritage and balanced use of the environment of the protected area. The following are national parks of Estonia:

1. Lahemaa National Park, intended for the protection of the natural and cultural heritage of the coastal landscapes of Northern Estonia;
2. Karula National Park, intended for the protection of the natural and cultural heritage of the hilly moraine landscapes of Southern Estonia;
3. Soomaa National Park, intended for the protection of the natural and cultural heritage of the mire landscapes and floodplain landscapes of transition zone of Estonia (Estonia intermedia);
4. Vilsandi National Park, intended for the protection of the natural and cultural heritage of the coastal landscapes of the Western Estonian archipelago;
5. Matsalu National Park, intended for the protection of the characteristic biotic communities of Western Estonia and of the natural and cultural heritage of the Väinameri Sea region.
6. Alutaguse National Park, the most recently founded, in 2018
7. A national park may include strict nature reserves, special management zones and limited management zones.

=== Nature conservation area ===
A nature conservation area is a protected area prescribed for the preservation, protection, restoration, research and introduction of the natural environment. The zones possible in a nature conservation area are the strict nature reserve, special management zone and limited management zone.

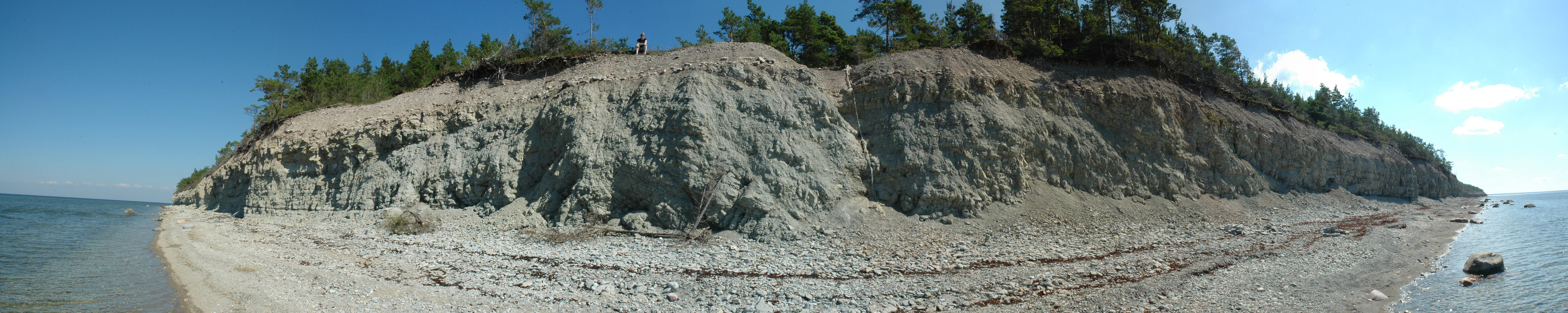
Panga cliff

=== Landscape protection area (nature park) ===
A landscape protection area is an area prescribed for the preservation, protection, restoration, research, introduction and regulation of use of landscapes of the protected area. A park, arboretum and forest stand are special types of landscape protection area. The zones possible in a landscape protection area are the special management zone and limited management zone.

=== Strict nature reserve ===
A strict nature reserve is a land or water area of a protected area whose natural status is unaffected by direct human activity and where the preservation and development of natural biotic communities is ensured only through natural processes. All types of human activity is prohibited within a strict nature reserve, and persons are prohibited from staying in such reserves, except in cases specified in subsections (3) and (4) of this section. Persons may stay in a strict nature reserve only for the purposes of supervision, rescue work or administration of the natural object. People may stay in a strict nature reserve for the purpose of monitoring and assessment of the status of the natural object only with the consent of the administrator of the protected area.

=== Special management zone ===
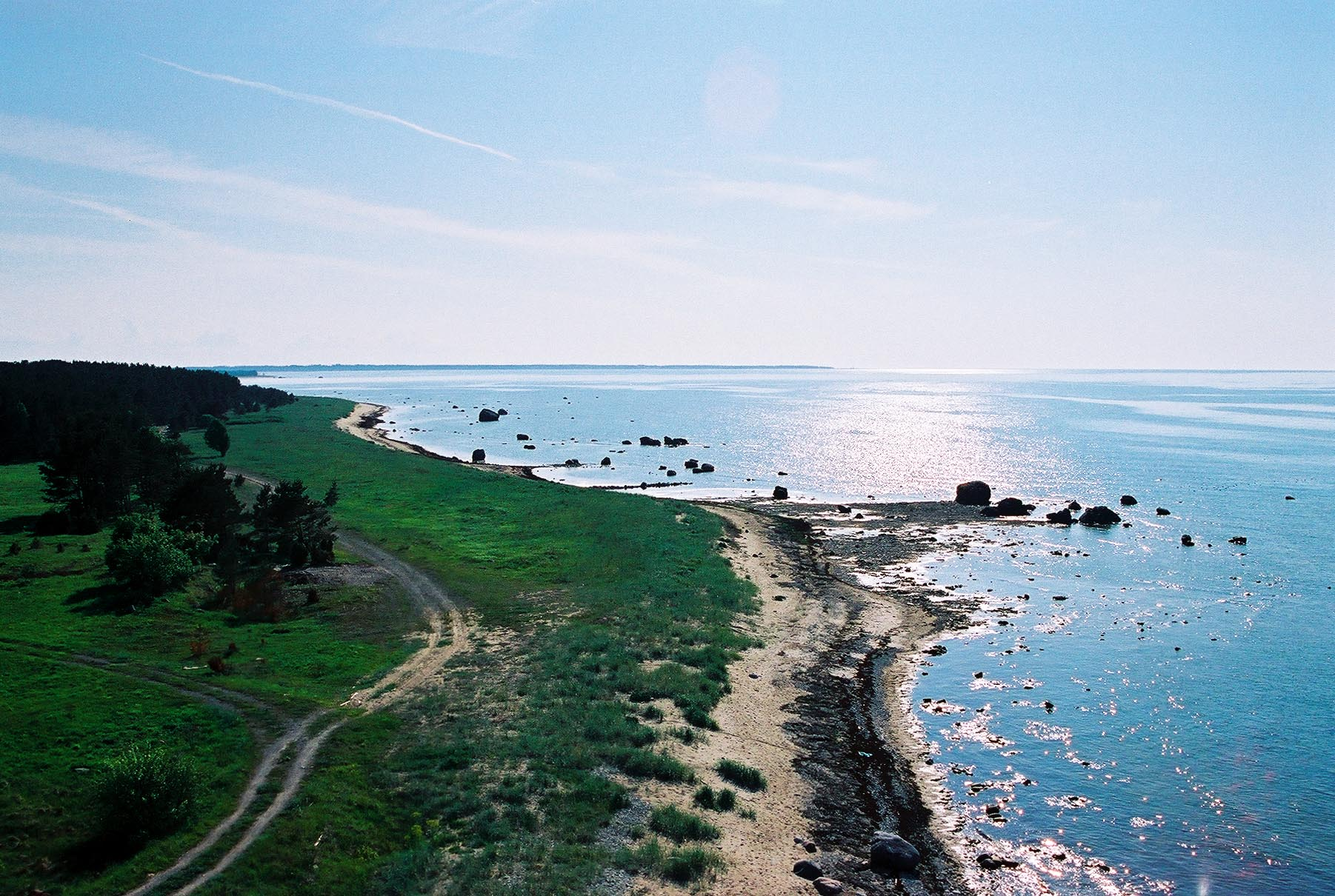
North-west coast of Estonia near Nõva, Lääne County.

A special management zone is a land or water area of a protected area prescribed for the preservation of natural and semi-natural biotic communities established or to be developed therein. Mineral resources present within a special management zone are not deemed to be resources intended for exploitation. Unless otherwise provided by the protection rules, the following shall be prohibited within a special management zone:

1. economic activities;
2. use of natural resources;
3. erection of new construction works;
4. staying of persons in the habitats of protected species and staging posts of migratory birds;
5. driving motor vehicles, off-road vehicles or floating vessels;
6. camping, building fires and organising public events.

The prohibition established by clauses (2) (4) and (5) of this section does not extend to supervision and rescue work, activities related to the administration of the natural object, and to research carried out with the consent of the administrator of the protected area. The following may be permitted by the protection rules in the special management zone as activities necessary for the preservation of the object or activities which do not harm the object:

1. maintenance work on existing land improvement systems and restoration of the water regime;
2. development of biotic communities in adherence to the objective of protection;
3. gathering of berries, fungi and other forest by-products;
4. hunting;
5. fishing;
6. erection of roads, utility works or non-production construction works for servicing an immovable located within the protected area, or the protected area, and maintenance of existing construction works;
7. activities necessary for guaranteeing the preservation of the characteristic features and species composition of semi-natural biotic communities, and activities for preservation of the living conditions of protected species;
8. gathering reed and seaweed.

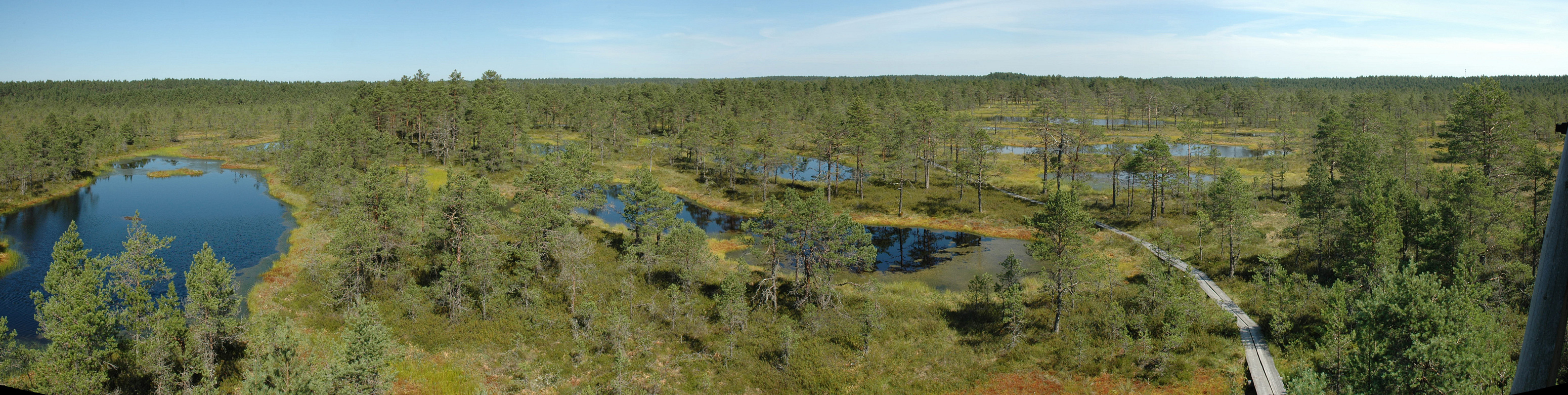
Viru raba in Lahemaa National Park

=== Limited management zone ===
A limited management zone is a land or water area of a protected area where economic activities are permitted, taking account of the restrictions provided by this Act. Unless otherwise provided by the protection rules, the following shall be prohibited within a limited management zone:

1. construction of new land improvement systems;
2. altering the water levels and shorelines of bodies of water, and creation of new bodies of water,
3. extraction of mineral resources and earth substances;
4. design of pure stands and planting of energy forests;
5. regeneration cutting;
6. training of crowns of trees and bushes, and cutting of woody plants without the consent of the administrator of the protected area;
7. use of biocides and plant protection products;
8. erection of construction works, including temporary construction works, and altering the exterior structure of construction works located in a national park;
9. hunting and fishing activities;
10. driving motor vehicles, off-road vehicles or floating vessels, except for the performance of work necessary for the maintenance of line facilities, and for forestry work or agricultural work in profit yielding land;
11. camping, building fires and organisation of public events in locations not intended for such purposes and unmarked by the administrator of the protected area;
12. gathering of reed on unfrozen ground.

An obligation to preserve the species and age diversity within biotic communities and a prohibition on haulage and transportation of timber out of the zone if the ground is not frozen may be established by the protection rules. Restrictions different than those provided by the Forest Act may be established by the protection rules with regard to the size and form of cutting areas and the composition of a forest within a limited management zone necessary for the preservation of a biotic community or protected species within the zone.

== See also ==
- Estonian Nature Fund
- List of national parks in the Baltics
- List of Ramsar sites in Estonia
- Category:Nature conservation in Estonia
- Category:Nature reserves in Estonia
