= List of nature reserves in the Republic of Ireland =

This is a list of nature reserves in Ireland.

The lists below shows the names and locations of nature reserves in Ireland. A nature reserve in Ireland is a designated area of importance to wildlife, protected by a ministerial order. The majority of these reserves are owned by the state, but some are under the ownership of organisations or in private ownership. The first reserves were established under the 1976 Wildlife Act. They are designated and managed by the National Parks and Wildlife Service of the Department of Housing, Local Government and Heritage. All these designated reserves are Natural Heritage Areas (NHAs), with some of them also listed as Special Areas of Conservation (SACs).

== Connacht ==
Nature reserve	Photo	County	Land area (hectares)	Owner	Established	Coordinates
Ballynastaig Wood	Trees in Ballynastaig Wood	Galway	9.758	State	1983	53.097°N 8.864°W
Clochar na gCon/Bealacooan Bog		Galway	1247	State	1999	53.271°N 9.428°W
Coole Garryland	Trees in Coole Park	Galway	363.583	State	1983	53.083°N 8.856°W
Derryclare	Derryclare Horseshoe	Galway	19	State	1980	53.484°N 9.758°W
Derrycrag Wood		Galway	110.477	State	1983	53.044°N 8.387°W
Leam West Bog		Galway	373.48	State	1991	53.423°N 9.489°W
Pollnaknockaun Wood		Galway	38.85	State	1983	53.063°N 8.388°W
Rosturra Wood		Galway	17.68	State	1983	53.06°N 8.355°W
Richmond Esker		Galway	15.7	State	1985	53.532°N 8.617°W
Knockmoyle Sheskin		Mayo	1198	State	1990	54.18°N 9.553°W
Oldhead Wood	Old Head Wood Nature Reserve	Mayo	17	State	1984	53.776°N 9.779°W
Owenboy		Mayo	397.1	State	1986	54.093°N 9.456°W
Ballygilgan	Barnacle Geese grazing at Ballygilgan seasonal pond	Sligo	29.5	State	1986	54.341°N 8.548°W
Easkey Bog		Sligo	607	State	1990	54.189°N 8.813°W

== Leinster ==
Nature reserve	Photo	County	Land area (hectares)	Owner	Established	Coordinates
Baldoyle Estuary	Baldoyle Estuary	Dublin	203	State	1988	53.402°N 6.124°W
North Bull Island		Dublin	118	Private	1988	53.362°N 6.138°W
North Bull Island	Bull Island Nature Reserve	Dublin	1318	State	1988	53.362°N 6.138°W
Rogerstown Estuary		Dublin	195.5	State	1988	53.505°N 6.135°W
Pollardstown Fen	Pollardstown Fen	Kildare	130	State	1986	53.187°N 6.844°W
Ballykeeffe Wood	Remains of Ballykeeffe quarry	Kilkenny	55.4	State	1980	52.611°N 7.393°W
Fiddown Island		Kilkenny	62.6	State	1988	52.326°N 7.318°W
Garryricken		Kilkenny	27.9	State	1980	52.497°N 7.415°W
Kyleadohir		Kilkenny	58.7	State	1980	52.533°N 7.454°W
Coolacurragh Wood		Laois	8.5	State	1982	52.864°N 7.509°W
Grantstown Wood and Grantstown Lough		Laois	48.6	State	1982	52.871°N 7.502°W
Timahoe Esker		Laois	13.5	State	1985	52.977°N 7.198°W
Slieve Bloom Mountains	Water course near The Cones	Laois/Offaly	2300	State	1985	53.092°N 7.576°W
Clara Bog	Clara Bog walkway	Offaly	460	State	1987	53.322°N 7.624°W
Mongan Bog	Mongan Bog	Offaly	119	An Taisce	1987	53.327°N 7.951°W
Raheenmore Bog		Offaly	162	State	1987	53.338°N 7.343°W
Scragh Bog		Westmeath	22.8	State	1992	53.579°N 7.36°W
Ballyteigue Burrow	Ballyteigue Burrow	Wexford	227	State	1990	52.21°N 6.659°W
The Raven	The Raven Nature Reserve	Wexford	589	State	1983	52.352°N 6.365°W
Wexford Wildfowl Reserve	North Slob seawall	Wexford	194	State and BirdWatch Ireland	1981	52.359°N 6.416°W
Deputy's Pass		Wicklow	47	State	1982	52.952°N 6.164°W
Glen of the Downs	Glen of the Downs	Wicklow	59	State	1980	53.136°N 6.115°W
Glendalough	Glendalough	Wicklow	157	State	1988	53.008°N 6.324°W
Glenealo Valley	Glenealo Valley	Wicklow	1958	State	1988	53.011°N 6.39°W
Knocksink Wood	Knocksink Wood	Wicklow	52.3	State	1994	53.2°N 6.183°W
Vale of Clara	Vale of Clara	Wicklow	220.57	State	1983	52.958°N 6.236°W

== Munster ==
Nature reserve	Photo	County	Land area (hectares)	Owner	Established	Coordinates
Ballyteigue	Ballyteigue	Clare	6.4	State	1986	53.026°N 9.266°W
Cahermurphy		Clare	9	State	1980	53°N 8.642°W
Dromore	Dromore Wood	Clare	370	State	1985	52.931°N 8.957°W
Keelhilla, Slieve Carron	Keelhilla	Clare	145.5	State	1986	53.086°N 8.997°W
Capel Island and Knockadoon Head		Cork	16.1	Private	1985	51.88°N 7.861°W
Capel Island and Knockadoon Head	Capel Island	Cork	126.9	State	1985	51.88°N 7.861°W
Glengarriff Wood	Glengarriff National Park	Cork	301	State	1991	51.752°N 9.575°W
Kilcolman Bog		Cork	21.398	Private	1993	52.247°N 8.613°W
Kilcolman Bog		Cork	29.287	State	1993	52.247°N 8.613°W
Knockomagh Wood		Cork	12.5	State	1989	51.506°N 9.31°W
Lough Hyne	Lough Hyne	Cork	65	State	1981	51.502°N 9.304°W
The Gearagh	The Gearagh	Cork	300	Private	1987	51.885°N 8.999°W
Castlemaine Harbour	Castlemaine Harbour	Kerry	923	State	1990	52.128°N 9.944°W
Cummeragh River Bog		Kerry	45.55	State	1994	51.871°N 10.065°W
Derrycunnihy Wood	Derrycunnihy Wood	Kerry	136	Private	1989	51.971°N 9.594°W
Derrymore Island		Kerry	106.07	Private	1989	52.255°N 9.83°W
Eirk Bog	Eirk Bog	Kerry	16	State	1986	51.946°N 9.666°W
Great Skellig	Skellig Michael	Kerry	22.6	State	1988	51.771°N 10.54°W
Little Skellig	Little Skellig	Kerry	7.8	Private	1988	51.782°N 10.509°W
Lough Nambrackdarrig	Lough Nambrackdarrig	Kerry	3.9	State	1988	52.082°N 9.898°W
Lough Yganavan	Lough Yganavan	Kerry	25.3	State	1988	52.093°N 9.893°W
Mount Brandon	Mount Brandon	Kerry	461.75	State	1986	52.268°N 10.237°W
Puffin Island	Puffin Island	Kerry	53.77	Private	1987	51.837°N 10.408°W
Puffin Island		Kerry	32.73	State	1987	51.837°N 10.408°W
Sheheree Bog		Kerry	8.9	Private	1990	52.04°N 9.481°W
Tearaght Island	Tearaght Island	Kerry	27.5	Private	1989	52.075°N 10.665°W
Tearaght Island		Kerry	19.1	State	1989	52.075°N 10.665°W
Tralee Bay	Tralee Bay	Kerry	754.53	State	1989	52.255°N 9.801°W
Uragh Wood	Uragh Wood	Kerry	87	State	1982	51.804°N 9.686°W
Redwood Bog		Tipperary	132	State	1991	53.154°N 8.078°W
Fenor Bog	Fenor Bog	Waterford	15.55	Private	2004	52.165°N 7.225°W

== Ulster ==
Nature reserve	Photo	County	Land area (hectares)	Owner	Established	Coordinates
Ballyarr Wood	A wooden walkway in Ballyarr Wood	Donegal	30	State	1986	55.029°N 7.712°W
Derkmore Wood		Donegal	8.7	State	1988	54.838°N 8.291°W
Duntally Wood		Donegal	15.3	State	1986	55.118°N 7.9°W
Lough Barra Bog	View over Lough Barra Bog, mostly of water	Donegal	176.4	State	1987	54.946°N 8.112°W
Meenachullion Bog		Donegal	194	State	1990	54.902°N 8.119°W
Pettigo Plateau		Donegal	900	State	1984	54.616°N 7.946°W
Rathmullen Wood		Donegal	32.73	State	1986	55.09°N 7.563°W

== See also ==
- Conservation in the Republic of Ireland
- List of national parks of the Republic of Ireland
- List of Special Areas of Conservation in the Republic of Ireland

== Sources ==
- Nature Reserves data set from the Department of Culture, Heritage and the Gaeltacht
