= List of Ramsar sites in the Republic of Ireland =

This list of Ramsar sites in the Republic of Ireland includes wetlands that are considered to be of international importance under the Ramsar Convention. Ireland currently has 45 sites designated as "Wetlands of International Importance" with a surface area of 66,994 hectares (669.94 km^{2}). For a full list of all Ramsar sites worldwide, see List of Ramsar wetlands of international importance.

== List of Ramsar sites ==
Name	Location	Area (km^{2})	Designated	Description	Image
Baldoyle Bay	Dublin; 53°24′N 6°8′W	2.03	25 October 1988		
Ballyallia Lough	County Clare 52°53′N 8°55′W	3.08	11 June 1996	Lowest lake on the River Fergus	
Ballycotton Bay	County Cork; 51°50′N 8°0′W	0.92	11 June 1996		
Ballymacoda	County Cork; 51°52′N 7°55′W	3.75	11 June 1996		
Bannow Bay	County Wexford; 52°27′N 6°17′W	9.58	11 June 1996		
Blacksod Bay and Broadhaven Bay	County Mayo; 54°03′N 10°0′W	6.83	11 June 1996	Broadhaven Bay includes Atlantic salt marsh, tidal mudflats, reefs and shallow bays.	
Blackwater Estuary	County Cork, County Waterford51°57′N 7°48′W	4.68	11 June 1996		
Broadmeadow Estuary	53°27′N 6°10′W	5.46	11 June 1996		
Castlemaine Harbour	County Kerry; 52°7′N 9°55′W	29.73	30 May 1990		
Clara Bog	County Offaly; 53°19′N 7°37′W	4.60	6 December 1988		
Coole Lough and Garryland Wood	County Galway; 53°5′N 8°51′W	3.64	30 May 1990		
Cork Harbour	County Cork; 51°50′N 8°15′W	14.36	11 June 1996		
Cummeen Strand	County Sligo; 54°17′N 8°30′W	14.91	11 June 1996		
Dundalk Bay	County Louth; 54°00′N 6°20′W	47.68	11 June 1996		
Dungarvan Harbour	County Waterford52°3′N 7°35′W	10.41	11 June 1996		
Easky Bog	County Sligo; 54°11′N 8°49′W	6.07	30 May 1990		
The Gearagh	County Cork; 51°52′N 9°1′W	3.07	30 May 1990		
Inner Galway Bay	53°12′N 9°10′W	119.05	11 June 1996		
Killala Bay and Moy Estuary	County Mayo, County Sligo; 54°15′N 9°10′W	10.61	11 June 1996		
Knockmoyle and Sheskin	County Mayo; 54°12′N 9°33′W	11.98	1 June 1987		
Lough Barra Bog	County Donegal; 54°57′N 8°7′W	1.76	1 June 1987		
Lough Corrib	53°30′N 9°15′W	177.28	11 June 1996		
Lough Derravaragh	County Westmeath; 53°40′N 7°20′W	11.20	11 June 1996		
Lough Ennell	County Westmeath; 53°27′N 7°23′W	14.04	11 June 1996		
Lough Gara	County Sligo, County Roscommon; 53°56′N 8°25′W	17.42	11 June 1996		
Lough Glen	County Westmeath; 53°25′N 7°23′W	0.81	11 June 1996		
Lough Iron	County Westmeath; 53°37′N 7°17′W	1.82	11 June 1996		
Lough Oughter	54°2′N 7°25′W	14.64	11 June 1996		
Lough Owel	County Westmeath; 53°35′N 7°23′W	10.32	11 June 1996		
Meenachullion Bog	County Donegal; 54°54′N 8°7′W	1.94	30 May 1990		
Mongan Bog	County Offaly; 53°19′N 7°58′W	1.27	6 December 1988		
North Bull Island	Dublin; 53°22′N 6°8′W	14.36	6 September 1988		
Owenboy	County Mayo; 54°6′N 9°28′W	3.97	1 June 1987		
Owenduff catchment	County Mayo; 54°3′N 9°40′W	13.82	31 July 1986		
Pettigo Plateau	County Donegal; 54°37′N 7°57′W	9.00	31 July 1986		
Pollardstown Fen	County Kildare; 53°11′N 6°51′W	1.30	30 May 1990		
Raheenmore Bog	County Offaly; 53°20′N 7°21′W	1.62	6 December 1988		
The Raven	County Wexford; 52°20′N 6°19′W	5.89	31 July 1986		
Rogerstown Estuary	Dublin; 53°30′N 6°8′W	1.95	25 October 1988		
Sandymount Strand and Tolka Estuary	53°20′N 6°12′W	6.54	11 June 1996		
Slieve Bloom Mountains	County Offaly, County Laois; 53°3′N 7°38′W	22.30	31 July 1986		
Tralee Bay	County Kerry; 52°16′N 9°48′W	8.61	10 July 1989		
Tramore Backstrand	County Waterford; 52°10′N 7°7′W	3.67	11 June 1996		
Trawbreaga Bay	County Donegal; 55°17′N 7°15′W	10.03	11 June 1996		
Wexford Wildfowl Reserve	County Wexford; 52°30′N 6°20′W	1.94	15 November 1984		

== See also ==
- Ramsar Convention
- List of Ramsar sites worldwide
- List of Special Protection Areas in the Republic of Ireland
