= Leam =

Leam or LEAM may refer to:

== Places ==
=== England ===
- River Leam, a river in Warwickshire
  - Leamington Spa, a town in Warwickshire
- Leam, Derbyshire, a hamlet

=== Elsewhere ===
- Leam, a townland of County Fermanagh, Northern Ireland
- Almería Airport (ICAO code: LEAM), Spain

== Other uses ==
- Leam Richardson (born 1979), English footballer
- Land Use Evolution and Impact Assessment Model, a computer model
- Lunar Ejecta and Meteorites Experiment, a lunar science experiment

== See also ==
- Leam Lane Estate, a housing estate in Gateshead, England
- Leam Valley, an electoral ward in Warwickshire
- Leam West Bog, a national nature reserve in County Galway, Ireland
- Bevill's Leam, an artificial drainage cutting at Pondersbridge, Cambridgeshire, England
- Morton's Leam, an artificial drainage channel in the Fens, England
- Smith's Leam, an artificial drainage cutting in the Fens, England
