= 1983 in the environment =

This is a list of notable events relating to the environment in 1983. They relate to environmental law, conservation, environmentalism and environmental issues.

== Events ==
- A number of protected areas were established in 1983, including Ballynastaig Wood in Ireland, Big Boggy National Wildlife Refuge in Texas, and Bukhansan National Park in South Korea.
- The Convention on the Conservation of Migratory Species of Wild Animals, also known as CMS or the Bonn Convention, enters into force. It aims to conserve terrestrial, marine and avian migratory species throughout their range.
- The 1983-1984 drought in the Sahel occurs. Desertification became widespread across several countries.

=== January ===
- US president Ronald Reagan signed the Nuclear Waste Policy Act.

=== February ===
- The U.S. Environmental Protection Agency bought the town of Times Beach, Missouri following the largest ever dioxin exposure in the country.

=== March ===
- The Alliance '90/The Greens political party won 27 seats in the West German federal election. It was the first Green Party to gain representation in state elections.
- The Convention on Long-Range Transboundary Air Pollution entered into force.

=== May ===
- The World Heritage Properties Conservation Act 1983 is passed in Australia.

=== July ===
- The Commonwealth v Tasmania, a significant Australian court case was decided in the High Court of Australia. It was a landmark decision in Australian constitutional law, and was a significant moment in the history of conservation in Australia. The case centered on the proposed construction of a hydro-electric dam on the Gordon River in Tasmania, which was supported by the Tasmanian government, but opposed by the Australian federal government and environmentalist groups.

=== October ===
- MARPOL 73/78 (International Convention for the Prevention of Pollution From Ships, 1973 as modified by the Protocol of 1978) entered into force.

=== December ===
- The Christian environmentalist organization A Rocha was founded.

== See also ==
- Egyptian Law 102 of 1983
- Human impact on the environment
- List of environmental issues
- List of years in the environment
