= Woodford, County Galway =

Woodford An Ghráig (Irish)
- Village
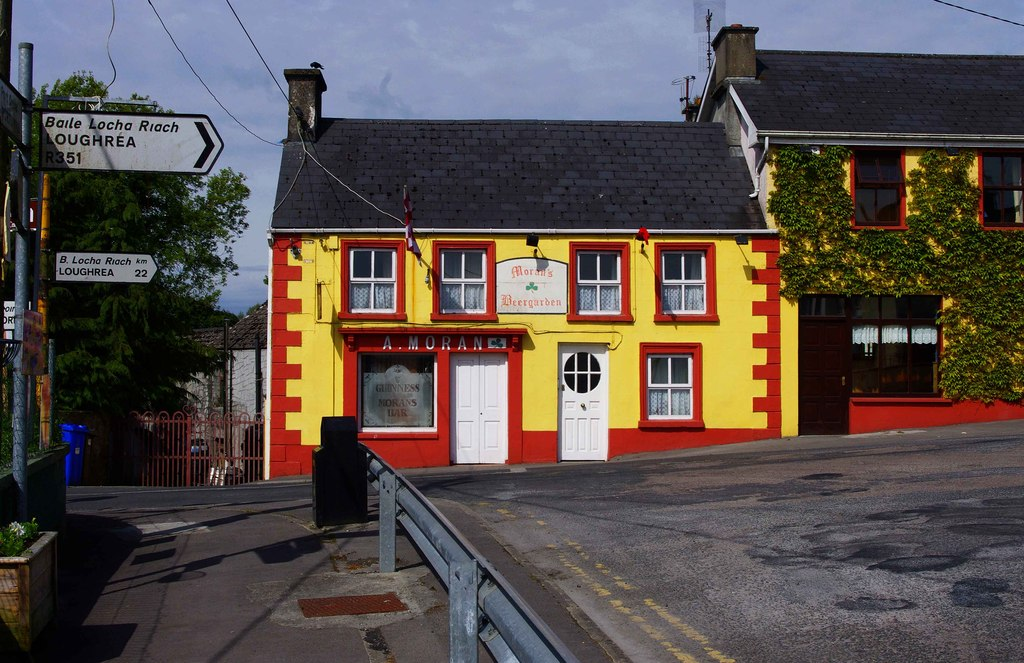
- Moran's pub, Woodford

- Location in Ireland
- Coordinates: 53°02′54″N 8°24′01″W
- Country: Ireland
- Province: Connacht
- County: County Galway
- Elevation: 73 m (240 ft)

Population (2022)
  - Total: 242
- Time zone: UTC+0 (WET)
  - Summer (DST): UTC-1 (IST (WEST))
- Irish Grid Reference: R732997

Woodford (Irish: An Ghráig, meaning 'the hamlet') is a village in the south-east of County Galway, Ireland. It is situated between the River Shannon and the Slieve Aughty mountains.

== History ==
The village's industrial history is indicated by a variant of its Irish name, Gráig na Muilte Iarainn, meaning 'village of the iron mills'. It is possible that the village started as a place to house and provide services for the iron workers of the 17th century. The surrounding hills have iron ore deposits; the abundant oak woods were used as a fuel for smelting. These had a lasting effect on the landscape; as the furnaces needed up to one hectare of mature woodland per day. The iron foundry had ceased operation by the late 18th or early 19th century.

The village also had a watermill in the valley and, in order for this to operate, the river was dammed. This is what now appears as a small lake below the village.

== Woodford Bay ==
The Woodford River is a tributary of the Shannon River. The river is dammed and broadens out into a small artificial lake called Woodford Bay. In the 17th century, this reservoir was used to power the blast furnace. Later, it was used as a source power for the corn mill and electric light energy for the town. While the bay is no longer used for these reasons, repairs were undertaken in 1980 to restore its aesthetic rather than commercial value.

== Tourism ==
There are three nature reserves within 5 km of the village at Pollnaknockaun, Derrycrag and Rosturra. Two of these are in Special Areas of Conservation. Derrygill Millennium Oaks Forest is also within walking distance of the village and is one of only fourteen Millennium Oak Forests established in the Republic of Ireland in the year 2000 when the government gifted an oak tree to every family in Ireland at the turn of the millennium. Cycle routes in the surrounding hinterland have views of Lough Derg and the River Shannon.

There is also fishing and boating on the Shannon. In the vicinity of the town are the ruins of a ringfort.

Every year, in late August, a "Furnace Festival" is held in Woodford to celebrate its ironworking history.

The Woodford Heritage Centre houses the East Galway Family History Society, an organisation that seeks to connect people with local historians, researchers, and genealogists who specialise in the surrounding areas.

== See also ==
- List of towns and villages in Ireland
- Galway
- History of Galway
