= Lough Barra Bog =

Nature reserve in County Donegal, Ireland

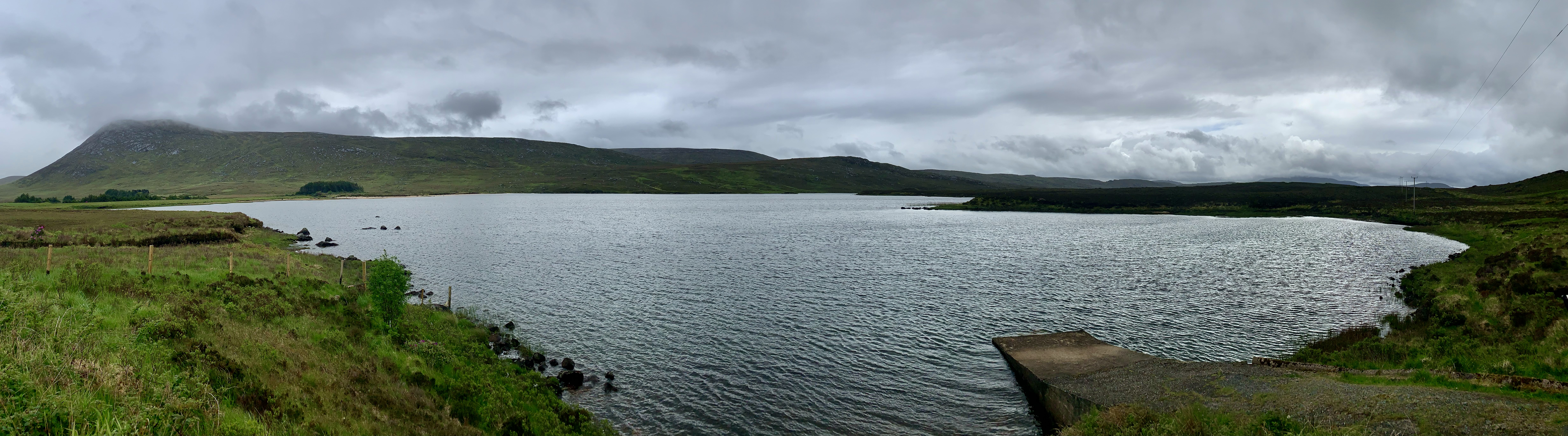
- Interactive map of Lough Barra Bog
- Location: County Donegal, Ireland
- Coordinates: 54°56′46″N 8°06′54″W
- Area: 436 acres (1.76 km^{2})
- Governing body: National Parks and Wildlife Service

Designations

Ramsar Wetland
- Designated: 1 June 1987
- Reference no.: 373

Lough Barra Bog is a blanket bog, Ramsar site and national nature reserve of approximately 436 acres (1.76 km^{2}) in County Donegal.

== Features ==
Lough Barra Bog was legally protected as a national nature reserve by the Irish government in 1987. In 1987, the site was also declared Ramsar site number 373.

The Bog is a lowland blanket bog in the upper Gweebarra river valley on the southern edge of Glenveagh National Park. It provides a habitat for three bird species protected under the EC Bird Directive, Greenland white-fronted Goose, merlin and golden plover. Adjacent to Lough Barra Bog is the Ramsar site and nature reserve, Meenachullion Bog, making it part of the largest area of intact lowland blanket bog of the northwest of Ireland. The reserve contains many flushes, small pools, and some remaining native deciduous woodland, predominantly made up of Quercus petraea.
