= Glencullen River =

River in Counties Wicklow and Dublin, Ireland

Glencullen River Irish: Abhainn Ghleann Cuilinn

Physical characteristics
- Source
  - location: Glencullen / Glendoo valley
  - elevation: 442 m (1,450 ft)
- Mouth: River Dargle
  - coordinates: 53°11′26″N 6°08′24″W
- Length: 11 km (6.8 mi)

Basin features
- River system: River Dargle
- Tributaries
  - left: Glasnabrockey
  - right: Middle Brook, Glanduff

The Glencullen River (Irish: Abhainn Ghleann Cuilinn), often the Cookstown River (Irish: An Chlóideach) below Enniskerry, is a watercourse of Dún Laoghaire–Rathdown (in southern County Dublin) and northern County Wicklow. It is about 11 kilometres (6.8 mi) long; it passes the nature reserve of Knocksink Wood and the village of Enniskerry, and joins the River Dargle near Bray. The river is in the jurisdictions of Dún Laoghaire–Rathdown and Wicklow County Councils, as well as within the purview of the Environmental Protection Agency.

== Name ==
The river is named for its source valley, the name of which means "the Holly Glen". Its alternate English-language name refers to an area near Enniskerry, while the Irish-language form, attested since at least 1213, may relate to the given name now rendered as Clodagh.

== Geology and catchment ==
The Glendoo / Glencullen combined valley structure is formed along a fault, underlain with granite (Devonian period) to the northwest and schist (Ordovician) to the southeast, with glacial till and glaciofluvial gravels covering the bedrock. The Glencullen and its headwaters primarily flow over schist and the glacial drift materials, and cut through the glacial materials, occasionally reaching bedrock.

== Course ==
The river rises from branches on the slopes of Glendoo and Cruagh mountains, opposite Tibradden. The most remote of these is a stream which flows into the valley at its peak, and feeds into both Glendoo and Glencullen. The Glencullen flow grows with further flows from the mountain slopes, most from Glendoo mountain, and including two flows from Boranaltry. It passes Brockey on the left bank, and other small flows, including one from a former named well, passes southwest of Glencullen and receives Glasnabrockey (Brockey Stream) from the right bank. Glasnabrockey, which significantly boosts the river's flow, comes from near Prince William's Seat. The river flows under Glencullen Bridge, and meets a stream on the left bank, coming from the Scalp. The Glencullen passes the former hamlet of Ballybrew, and Killegar, and comes to Knocksink Woods, passing Enniskerry within those woods. It then flows from the village area, under an ornamental estate bridge, towards the N11 road, and joins the River Dargle.

== Flora and fauna ==
The rapidly-flowing river holds brown trout, as well as a modest presence of salmon in its lowest reaches, and some eels. Its ecological status for fish was rated in 2018 as "good". The upper course of the river is in open upland, with little tree cover, but there are more trees approaching Enniskerry, and then the river enters Knocksink Wood, on calcareous glacial drift, with some granite blocks in the river bed. The wood is an official nature reserve, as "a woodland ecosystem which is of scientific interest" and also a Special Area of Conservation. Major features include petrifying water flows (tufa springs and seeps) and "old sessile oak woods", along with alluvial forest. The woodland hosts "particularly diverse woodland invertebrate fauna" as well as frogs and a number of rare plants, such as blue fleabane, ivy-leaved bellflower and yellow archangel, as well as abundant ferns and, in certain areas, lichens .

== Oversight ==
The river begins in the jurisdiction of Dún Laoghaire–Rathdown County Council, and passes to that of Wicklow County Council. It is within the purview of the Environmental Protection Agency and Inland Fisheries Ireland.

== See also ==
- List of rivers of County Dublin
