= Basalt Waste Isolation Project =

The Basalt Waste Isolation Project (BWIP) broke ground at Hanford Site in 1976, conducting tests aimed at siting a safe and isolated repository for reactor irradiated fuel and other nuclear byproducts.

Between 1976 and enactment of the Nuclear Waste Policy Act of 1982 (NWPA), studies at the Hanford site continued to evaluate the geologic and hydrologic suitability of the BWIP repository in the underlying basalt. The BWIP Site Characterization Report was published in November 1982, explaining the details and status of the project. When the Department of Energy (DOE) published an Environmental Assessment in May 1986, it recommended BWIP to the President as a candidate site.

The main concern in the post-1982 phase of the project had been the suitability of the project's quality assurance procedures during the early phases of BWIP. President Reagan approved BWIP as a candidate site in May 1986, and DOE stopped most of the site characterization activities at the BWIP until quality assurance procedures could be adopted that would satisfy Nuclear Regulatory Commission (NRC) requirements.

BWIP's status as a candidate site was short lived. Only 19 months after the President approved the BWIP as a candidate site for the repository, Congress amended the NWPA in Title V of the Omnibus Budget Reconciliation Act of 1987. This narrowed the search for a repository site by designating Yucca Mountain as the sole candidate. DOE was directed to terminate all BWIP activities within 90 days after December 22, 1987.
