= Knocksink Wood =

Nature reserve and conservation area in County Wicklow, Ireland

- Coill Chnoc Sinche
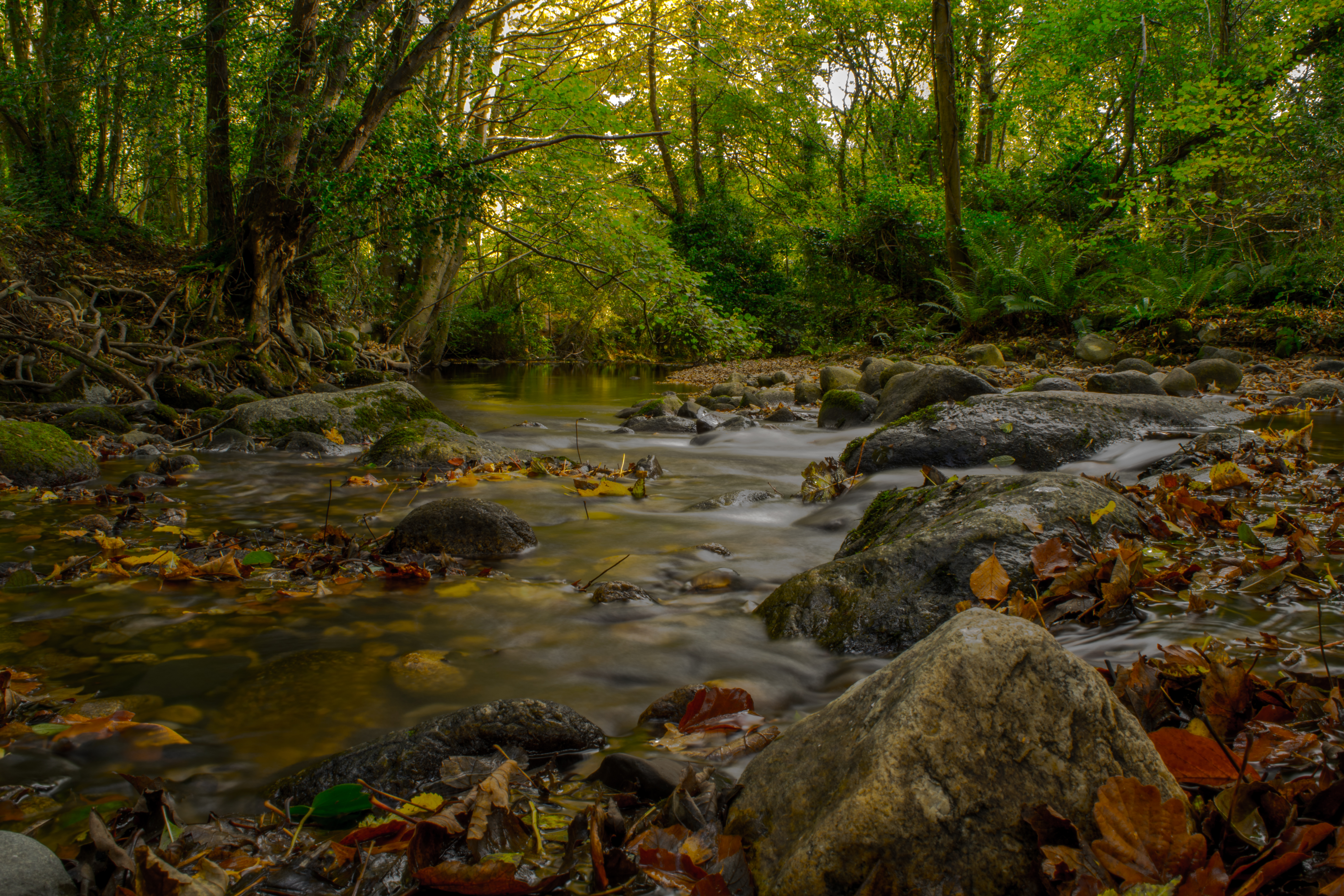

- Location within Ireland
- Location: County Wicklow, Ireland
- Coordinates: 53°12′14″N 6°11′31″W
- Area: 129 acres (52 ha)
- Designation: SAC; Nature Reserve
- Governing body: National Parks and Wildlife Service

Knocksink Wood (Irish: Coill Chnoc Sinche, meaning 'Sinneach's Hill Wood') is a national nature reserve located in the valley of the Glencullen River in County Wicklow, Ireland, near the village of Enniskerry. With an area of approximately 129 acres (0.52 km^{2}), it is managed by the Irish National Parks & Wildlife Service.

== Features ==
The reserve is located in a valley, with the slopes predominantly sessile oak. Other areas have more mixed woodland. Within the reserve there are numerous springs and areas with water seepage, with the petrifying springs being one of the most important habitats listed in the EU Habitats Directive. Knocksink Wood has the most diverse woodland invertebrate fauna recorded in Ireland, with a number of animals specific to wet woodland that are of threatened status in the EU.

== Status and facilities ==
Knocksink Wood was legally protected as a national nature reserve by the Irish government in 1994. The wood is also listed as a Special Area of Conservation. The reserve had an educational centre, which used to host tours of the wood, and provide information to the public. Although still listed by the National Parks and Wildlife Service as of 2021, the office had permanently closed by 2019.
