= Knockmoyle Sheskin =

Nature reserve and Ramsar site in County Mayo, Ireland

- Interactive map of Knockmoyle Sheskin
- Location: County Mayo, Ireland
- Coordinates: 54°10′48″N 9°33′04″W
- Area: 2,960 acres (12.0 km^{2})
- Governing body: National Parks and Wildlife Service

Ramsar Wetland
- Official name: Knockmoyle/Sheskin
- Designated: 1 June 1987
- Reference no.: 372

Knockmoyle Sheskin (Irish: An Cnoc Maol agus An Seisceann) also known as Knockmoyle/Sheskin or Knockmoyle and Sheskin is an intact Atlantic blanket bog, national nature reserve and Ramsar site of approximately 2,960 acres (12.0 km^{2}) in County Mayo.

== Features ==
Knockmoyle Sheskin was legally protected as a national nature reserve by the Irish government in 1986. In 1987, the site was also declared Ramsar site number 372.

The reserve is a lowland blanket bog, an intact Atlantic blanket bog, with a high density of pools which contain interesting flushes, with some forming small acidic lakes. The site has a rich flora owing to the lack of burning or grazing, with well developed cover planting. An unusual feature of the site is small areas of Betula pubescens, and Homalothecium nitens, a rare moss. Other species recorded there include black bog rush, bog cotton, deer sedge, purple moor grass, marsh saxifrage, wild angelica, and marsh arrowgrass.
