= Coolacurragh Wood =

National nature reserve in Country Laois, Ireland

- Location within Ireland
- Interactive map of Coolacurragh Wood
- Type: National
- Location: County Laois
- Coordinates: 52°48′58″N 7°39′58″W
- Area: 21 acres (8.50 ha)
- Operator: National Parks and Wildlife Service (Ireland)
- Status: Open all year

Coolacurragh Wood is a national nature reserve of approximately 21 acres (0.085 km^{2}) located in County Laois, Ireland. It is managed by the Irish National Parks & Wildlife Service.

== Features ==
Coolacurragh Wood was legally protected as a national nature reserve by the Irish government in 1982. It is very close to another nature reserve, Grantstown Wood and Grantstown Lough.

Coolacurragh Wood is a wet woodland, with rich base soils. The woodland is predominantly ash, alder and birch, with an under planting of hawthorn, meadowsweet, nettle and brambles. The reserve also has a lake which provides fish for otters, kingfishers and cormorants.
