= Knockomagh Wood =

- Location within Ireland
- Type: National
- Location: County Cork
- Coordinates: 51°30′22″N 9°18′36″W
- Area: 31 acres (12.55 ha)
- Operator: National Parks and Wildlife Service (Ireland)
- Status: Open all year

Knockomagh Wood is a national nature reserve of approximately 31 acres (0.13 km^{2}) located in County Cork, Ireland. It is managed by the National Parks and Wildlife Service.

== History ==
Knockomagh Wood was legally protected as a national nature reserve by the Irish government in 1989.

The area was damaged during Hurricane Ophelia in 2017, which led to the wood being closed for a period of time.

== Features ==
The wood is a small area of sessile oak and mixed broadleaf trees. There are a number of walks in the area, around Lough Hyne and up Knockomagh Hill. Coillte own and manage the conifer trees above Knockomagh Wood on the slopes of the Hill.
