= Timahoe Esker =

Nature reserve in County Laois, Ireland

- Location within Ireland
- Type: National
- Location: County Laois
- Coordinates: 52°58′N 7°11′W
- Area: 33.4 acres (13.52 ha)
- Operator: National Parks and Wildlife Service (Ireland)
- Status: Open all year

Timahoe Esker is a national nature reserve of approximately 33.4 acres (0.135 km^{2}) located in County Laois, Ireland. It is managed by the Irish National Parks & Wildlife Service.

== Location ==
Timahoe Esker is around 10 km south-east of Portlaoise. The southern end is around 1 km north of the village of Timahoe, and the "Esker Walk" is a 1 km-long trail along the esker.

== Features ==
Timahoe Esker was legally protected as a national nature reserve by the Irish government in 1985. It is also deemed to be a site of County Geological Significance by the Geological Survey of Ireland.

Timahoe Esker, with Richmond Esker, is one of only a small number of esker ridges that remain in Ireland and that have native woodland. The area was planted with conifers in 1963. The woodland is made up of ash, pedunculate oak and grey willow with hazel and hawthorn. Other flora on the site include bugle, shield fern, and bluebells. Long-tailed tits nest on the site. Buckthorn, blue fleabane and carline thistle are also found on the site.

Timahoe Esker is one of the few extant eskers in County Laois that was not extensively quarried for sand and gravel. Only two of the five esker high ridge segments at Timahoe are intact. The ridges were deposited at the end of the last Ice Age under and at the withdrawing margins of the ice sheet. Four segments of the esker are also Natural Heritage Areas, number 000421. There is a 1 km walk along the site, known as the Esker Walk.
