= Duntally Wood =

- Location within Ireland
- Type: National
- Location: County Donegal
- Coordinates: 55°07′05″N 7°54′04″W
- Area: 37 acres (14.97 ha)
- Operator: National Parks and Wildlife Service (Ireland)
- Status: Open all year

Duntally Wood is a national nature reserve of approximately 37 acres (0.15 km^{2}) located in County Donegal, Ireland. It is managed by the Irish National Parks & Wildlife Service.

== Features ==
Duntally Wood was legally protected as a national nature reserve by the Irish government in 1986. The reserve is also a candidate for a Special Area of Conservation.

The woodland includes ash, elm, hazel, holly, oak and downy birch, with an under planting of bluebells, bugle, early purple orchid, hard fern, meadowsweet, wild garlic and wood anemone. Among the birds found in the reserve are buzzards, jays, ravens, sparrowhawks, and tree-creepers. The site has a 2.5 km looped trail.
