= Keelhilla, Slieve Carron =

Natural nature reserve in County Clare, Ireland

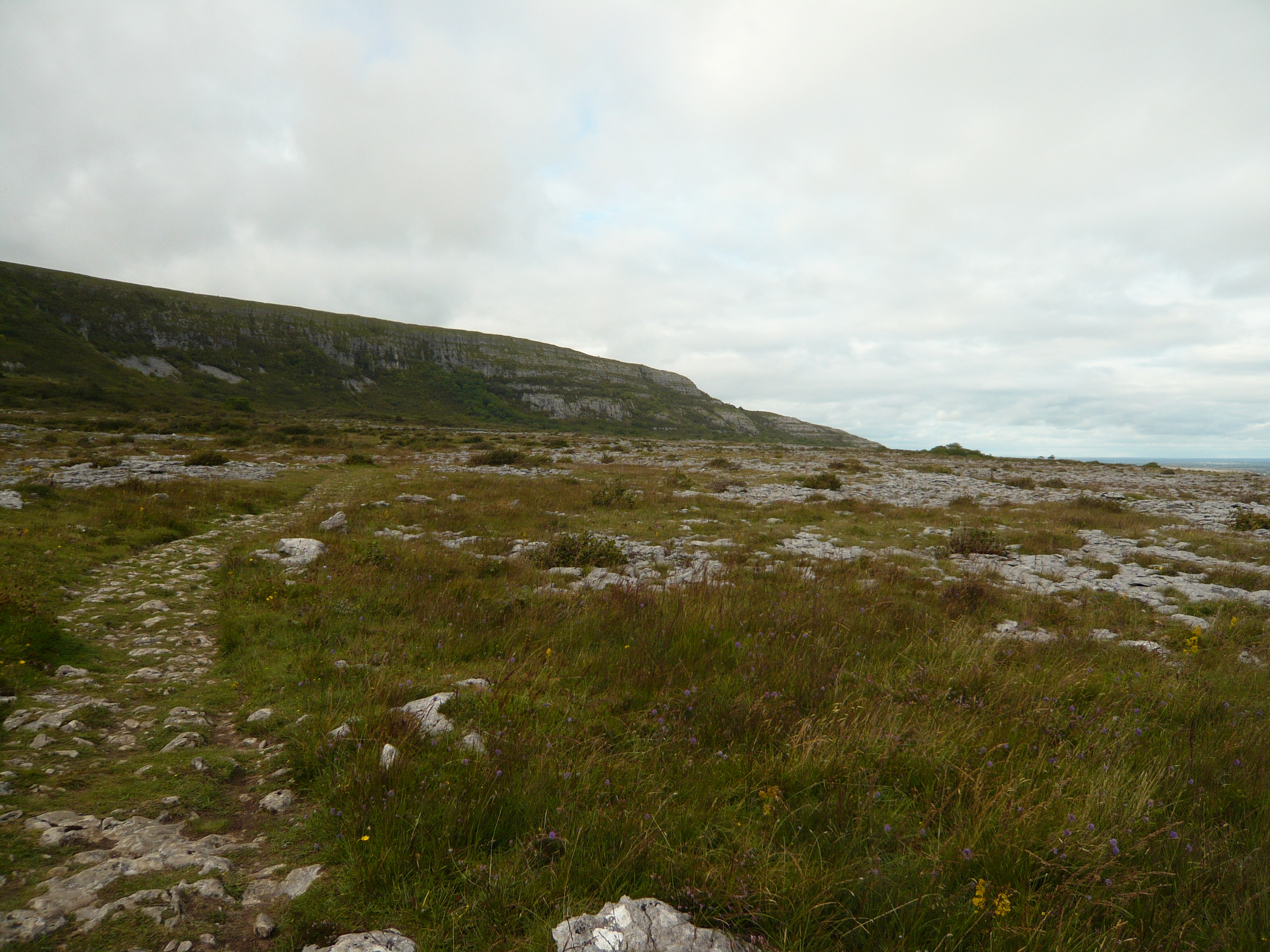

- Location within Ireland
- Type: National
- Location: near Carran, County Clare
- Coordinates: 53°05′06″N 8°59′46″W
- Area: 360 acres (145.69 ha)
- Operator: National Parks and Wildlife Service
- Status: Open all year

Keelhilla, Slieve Carron is a national nature reserve of approximately 360 acres (1.5 km^{2}) located near Carran, County Clare, Ireland. It is managed by the Irish National Parks and Wildlife Service.

== Features ==
Keelhilla, Slieve Carron, sometimes referred to as the Slieve Carran Nature Reserve, was legally protected as a national nature reserve by the Irish government in 1986. The site forms a part of the wider Burren limestone landscape located on the north-east edge of the Burren plateau, with a karst topography. The site includes karst pavement, scrub grassland, and woodland.

Some of the features of the reserve which fall under European priority habitats are the orchid-bearing calcareous grassland, limestone pavement, and petrifying springs. Among the recorded animals there are choughs and peregrine falcons, and a herd of feral goats. A rare glue fungus has been recorded on the hazel trees growing in Keelhilla. The site also contains an early medieval ecclesiastical settlement associated with St Colman mac Duagh, with a number of archaeological monuments including a stone oratory, a holy well, and a graveyard. There are some older archaeological sites in the reserve dating from the Bronze Age. The site has two designated walkways.
