= Capel Island =

Small island in County Cork, Ireland

Native name: Oileán an Cháplaigh
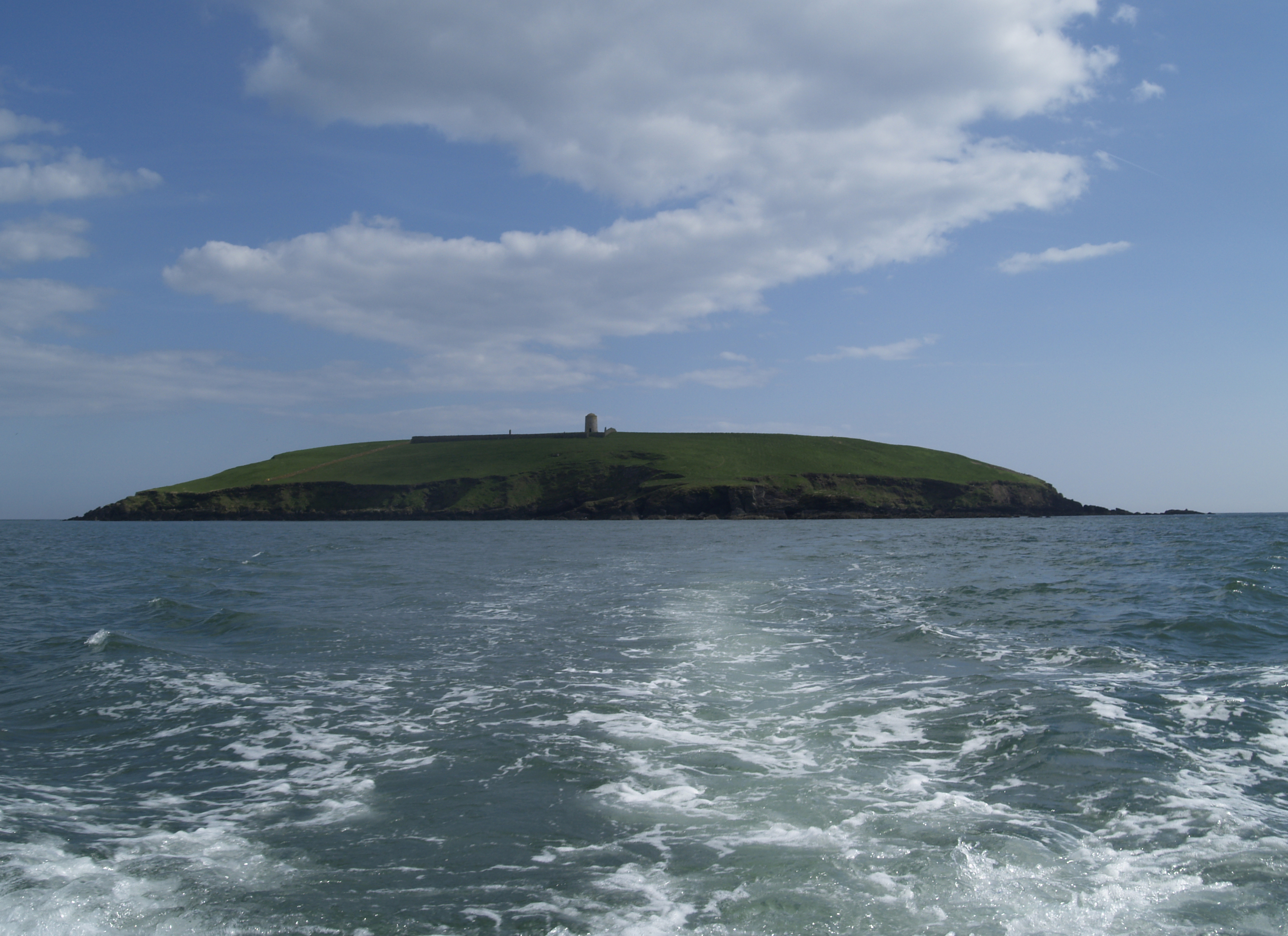
- View from the sea

- Location within island of Ireland

Geography
- Location: Atlantic Ocean
- Coordinates: 51°52′57.36″N 7°51′11.88″W

Administration
- Ireland
- Province: Munster
- County: Cork

Demographics
- Population: 0

Capel Island (Gaeilge: Oileán an Cháplaigh) is a small island in County Cork, Ireland located a short distance from Knockadoon Head, near Youghal.

== Features ==
Capel Island and Knockadoon Head were legally protected as a national nature reserve by the Irish government in 1985. Most of the reserve, 314 acres (1.27 km^{2}), is owned by the state, with a small part in private ownership 40 acres (0.16 km^{2}). The reserve includes Capel Island, Knockadoon Head and the area of sea between.

The tower on the island is an incomplete 19th century lighthouse. The island is home to a herd of goats.

A story is told of how the island got its name. There was a swimming race to reach the island for ownership. As one man was about to touch land the other reached forth his sword and pipped him at the post. A name associated with this story is De Capel Brookes.

Permission from BirdWatch Ireland is required in order to land on the island.
