= Lough Yganavan and Lough Nambrackdarrig =

Lakes in County Kerry, Ireland

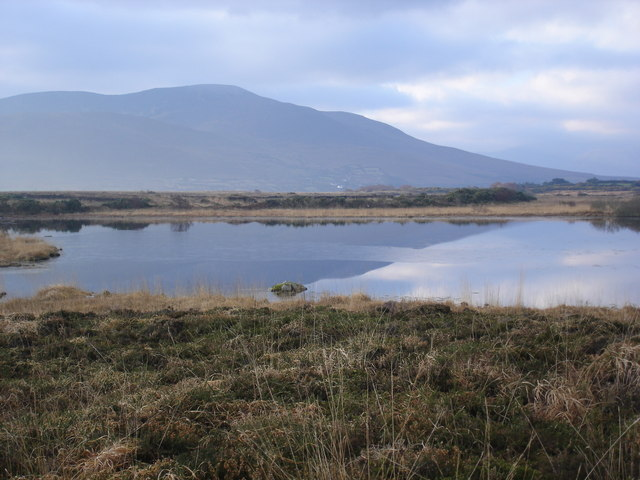
- Lough Nambrackdarrig in County Kerry

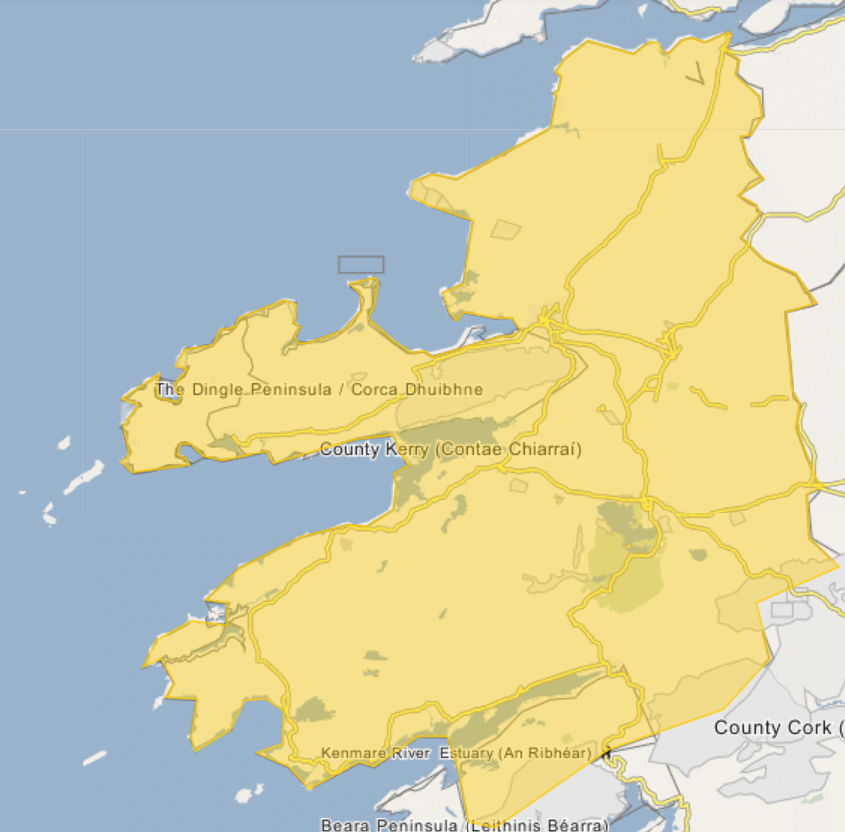
- Location within County Kerry Location within Ireland
- Coordinates: 52.0967°N 9.8825°W

Lough Yganavan and Lough Nambrackdarrig (Irish: Loch Gaineamháin agus Loch na mBreac Dearg) are two lakes of ecological importance in County Kerry, Ireland. In 1988, Lough Nambrackdarrig and the southern half of Lough Yganavan were designated as National Nature Reserves (areas in ha: 3.9 & 25.3). Since 1998, the lakes have been included in a Special Area of Conservation (SAC) of 271.6 hectares (3 km^{2}), which protects land in private ownership and the two state-owned nature reserves. The habitats in the SAC include fixed dunes, a type of machair.

== Fauna ==
The SAC is one of a small number of areas in which the rare Kerry slug and natterjack toad are found.
