= Pettigo Plateau =

Bog and heath designated area in County Donegal, Ireland

- Interactive map of Pettigo Plateau
- Location: County Donegal, Ireland
- Coordinates: 54°36′58″N 7°56′31″W
- Area: 2,224 acres (9.00 km^{2})
- Governing body: National Parks and Wildlife Service

Designations

Ramsar Wetland
- Designated: 31 July 1896
- Reference no.: 334

Pettigo Plateau is a blanket bog and wet heath, Ramsar site, protected area and national nature reserve of approximately 224 acres (0.91 km^{2}) in County Donegal.

== Features ==
Pettigo Plateau was legally protected as a national nature reserve by the Irish government in 1984. In 1986, the site was also declared Ramsar site number 334. The site is a Special Protection Area, and with Dunragh Loughs a Special Area of Conservation. The protected area extends into County Fermanagh, with cross border cooperation in monitoring and surveying taking place there between the RSPB and BirdWatch Ireland.

Pettigo Plateau is located to the west of Lough Derg. The reserve's habitats are blanket bog, lakes and wet heath, being one of the few intact bogs in County Donegal. Among the recorded flora on the reserve are cowberry, white sedge and a wide variety of bog moss species. Fauna include badgers, common frogs, common lizards, Irish hare and otters. Numerous birds live on the reserve such as merlin, hen harriers, peregrines and it is a breeding site for golden plovers. Greater white-fronted geese overwinter at the reserve. The highland blanket bogs of Pettigo Plateau are rare in Ireland, and span low hills and broad basins with a large quantity of acidic, nutrient-poor pools and lakes.

The area is now uninhabited, but two cottages remain from the last families to live on what was part of the Leslie estate in the mid-1800s. Access to the site is along an old trackway that runs through the reserve.
