= Non-Proliferation Trust =

U.S. nonprofit organization

The organization had initially planned to establish the international repository on the Palmyra atoll, which due to its remote location and highly stable geology would have offered very favorable security and safety features.

The idea shifted to Russia both for US political as well as Russian financial reasons.

Palmyra Atoll

The Non-Proliferation Trust (NPT) is a U.S. nonprofit organization that, at the beginning of the 21st century, advocated storing 10,000 tons of U.S. nuclear waste in Russia for a fee of $15 billion paid to the Russian government and $250 million paid to a fund for Russian orphans. The group was headed by Admiral Daniel Murphy. This proposal was endorsed by the Russian atomic energy ministry, MinAtom, which estimated that the proposal could eventually generate $150 billion in revenue for Russia.

== See also ==
- Halter Marine
- Federal Agency on Atomic Energy (Russia)
