= Rathmullen Wood =

Nature reserve in County Donegal, Ireland

- Location within Ireland
- Type: National
- Location: County Donegal
- Coordinates: 55°05′24″N 7°33′47″W
- Area: 82 acres (33.18 ha)
- Operator: National Parks and Wildlife Service (Ireland)
- Status: Open all year

Rathmullen Wood is a national nature reserve of approximately 82 acres (0.33 km^{2}) located in County Donegal, Ireland. It is managed by the Irish National Parks & Wildlife Service.

== Features ==
Rathmullen Wood (also spelt Rathmullan Wood; Rathmullan village is nearby) was legally protected as a national nature reserve by the Irish government in 1986. The reserve is also a candidate for a Special Area of Conservation.

The wood is a high quality example of an old Irish sessile oak woodland. The woods also feature downy birch, hazel and holly. The large birch trees are a non-native species, and thus do not support the same level of biodiversity as the rest of the woods, and it is actively managed to stop it out-competing the native tree species. Flora on the reserve include bilberry, bluebells, bugle, hard fern, wild garlic, and woodrush. Among the birds which inhabit the woods are buzzards, jays, ravens, sparrowhawks, tree-creepers and woodcock. Badgers, deer, otters, and foxes have also been recorded on the site. The site has a 1km looped trail.
