= Glenealo Valley =

Valley in County Wicklow, Ireland

Glenealo
- Gleann Abhlach
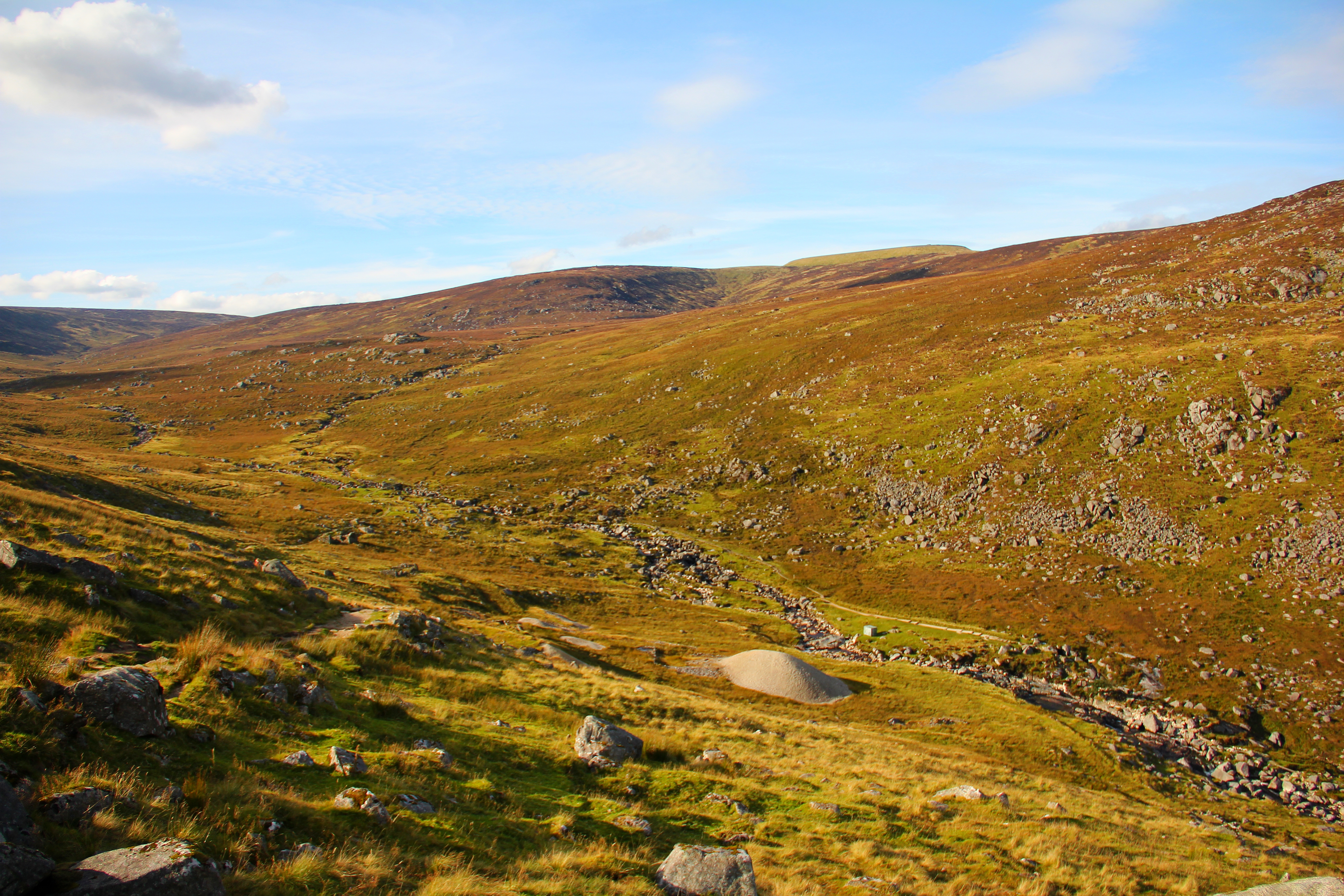

- Location within Ireland
- Location: County Wicklow, Ireland
- Coordinates: 53°00′40″N 6°23′24″W
- Area: 4,838 acres (19.58 km^{2})
- Governing body: National Parks and Wildlife Service

Glenealo Valley (Irish: Gleann Abhlach, meaning 'The Valley of the Apple Trees') is a national nature reserve of approximately 4,838 acres (19.58 km^{2}) located in County Wicklow, Ireland. It is managed by the Irish National Parks & Wildlife Service, part of the Department of Housing, Local Government and Heritage.

== Features ==
Glenealo Valley was legally protected as a national nature reserve by the Irish government in 1988. The reserve is primarily an open valley set within the Wicklow Mountains, with a large plateau area of peatland and mixed heathland. The area was the site of a former mine, which was closed in the 1950s. A population of feral goats lives in the area, descended from the goats the miners left behind in the valley when the mine was abandoned.

The valley forms part of the 10km Spinc and Glenealo Valley Loop walking trail.
