= Derrycrag Wood Nature Reserve =

Nature reserve and conservation area in County Galway, Ireland

- Location within Ireland
- Type: National
- Location: near Woodford, County Galway
- Coordinates: 53°02′38″N 8°23′02″W
- Area: 273 acres (110.48 ha)
- Operator: National Parks and Wildlife Service (Ireland)
- Status: Open all year

Derrycrag Wood Nature Reserve is a national nature reserve and Special Area of Conservation of approximately 273 acres (1.10 km^{2}) located near Woodford, County Galway, Ireland. It is managed by the Irish National Parks & Wildlife Service.

== Features ==
Derrycrag Wood Nature Reserve was legally protected as a national nature reserve by the Irish government in 1983. It is also a Special Area of Conservation for its old sessile oak woodland.

Derrycrag Wood, with Pollnaknockaun and Rosturra Wood, represent fragments of the previously extensive oak and ash forests which dominated the local landscape for hundreds of years. There is also an under planting of hazel, holly, and other woodland flora. Animals including red squirrels, foxes, badgers, pine martens, bats, sparrowhawks, jays, and kestrels live on the reserve. The rare shrub, bird cherry, grows in the wood along the banks of the Woodford River. There are two trails within the reserve.
