= Richmond Esker =

Nature reserve in Ireland

- Location within Ireland
- Type: National
- Location: near Moylough, County Galway
- Coordinates: 53°31′55″N 8°37′01″W
- Area: 39 acres (15.78 ha)
- Operator: National Parks and Wildlife Service (Ireland)
- Status: Open all year

Richmond Esker is a national nature reserve of approximately 39 acres (0.16 km^{2}) located near Moylough, County Galway, Ireland. It is managed by the Irish National Parks & Wildlife Service.

== Features ==
Richmond Esker was legally protected as a national nature reserve by the Irish government in 1985.

Richmond Esker, with Timahoe Esker, is one of only a small number of esker ridges that remain in Ireland and that have native woodland. The site has been planted with conifers and other non-native species, but the NPWS have stated the goal of expanding the native woods through management. A review of historical maps of the area concluded that there was a period around 1838 that the area was completely devoid of trees, and that the wood had been re-established by 1892. In 1951 Fagus sylvatica and Larix were planted on the site. Other species recorded on the reserve include Avenula pubescens, Luzula sylvatica, Poa nemoralis, and Mnium hornum.
