= Leam West Bog =

Nature reserve in County Galway, Ireland

- Interactive map of Leam West Bog
- Location: County Galway, Ireland
- Coordinates: 53°24′58″N 9°29′13″W
- Area: 923 acres (3.74 km^{2})
- Governing body: National Parks and Wildlife Service

Leam West Bog is a national nature reserve of approximately 923 acres (3.74 km^{2}) in County Galway. It is managed by the Irish National Parks & Wildlife Service.

== Features ==
Leam West Bog was legally protected as a national nature reserve by the Irish government in 1991.

As a diverse blanket bog, it has been deemed of international importance due to the diversity it holds in both acidic and alkaline habitats due to the varying geology on the site. Among the habitats found on the reserve are bog pools, rock outcrops, wet quaking areas, streams and flushes. It is the largest areas of intact bog in Connemara, with both low and highland bog.
