= Cahermurphy Nature Reserve =

Nature reserve in Ireland

- Location within Ireland
- Interactive map of Cahermurphy Nature Reserve
- Type: National
- Location: County Clare
- Coordinates: 53°00′04″N 8°38′38″W
- Area: 22.2 acres (8.98 ha)
- Operator: National Parks and Wildlife Service (Ireland)
- Status: Open all year

Cahermurphy Nature Reserve is a national nature reserve of approximately 22.2 acres (0.090 km^{2}) located in County Clare, Ireland. It is managed by the Irish National Parks & Wildlife Service.

== Features ==
Cahermurphy, also known as Caher (Murphy), was legally protected as a national nature reserve by the Irish government in 1980.

Cahermurphy is a small sessile oak wood, which contains a number of habitats such as a small stream, supporting a diverse set of flora. In a NPWS survey of old sessile oak woods conducted from 2011 to 2012, Cahermurphy was rated unfavourably overall with negative native species regeneration and signs of pressure from grazing animals.

The reserve forms a part of a larger area known as Cahermurphy Forest which is managed by Coillte, and is denoted by a looped walk called the Cahermurphy Looped Trail. The area is locally known as "White Sands" due to the sandy shore of Lough Graney. The poem Cúirt an Mheán Oíche (1780) by Brian Merriman is about the Cahermurphy area.
