= Knockadoon Head =

Cape and nature reserve in County Cork, Ireland

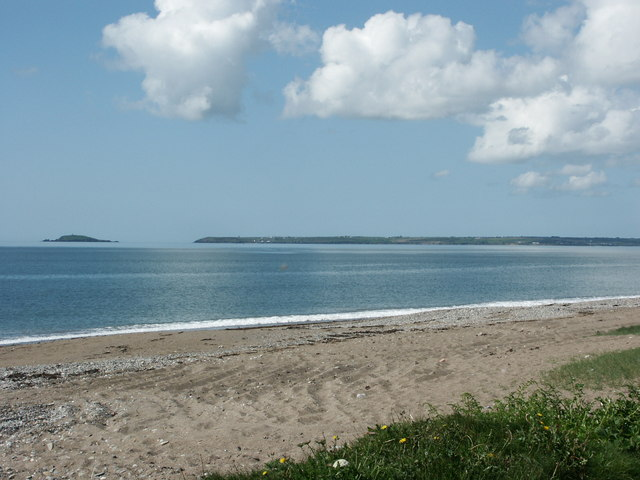
- Capel Island and Knockadoon Head

- Location within Ireland
- Type: National
- Location: County Cork
- Coordinates: 51°52′48″N 7°51′40″W
- Operator: National Parks and Wildlife Service (Ireland)
- Status: Open all year

Knockadoon Head is a headland and national nature reserve with Capel Island of approximately 353 acres (1.43 km^{2}) located in County Cork, Ireland. It is partly managed by the Irish National Parks & Wildlife Service, with areas under private ownership.

== Features ==
Capel Island and Knockadoon Head were legally protected as a national nature reserve by the Irish government in 1985. Most of the reserve, 314 acres (1.27 km^{2}), is owned by the state, with a small part in private ownership 40 acres (0.16 km^{2}). The reserve includes Capel Island, Knockadoon Head and the area of sea between.

Knockadoon Head has a signal tower, which was built in 1803 to warn of French invasion. It was abandoned in 1815. The reserve has a looped cliff walk.

In 2003, a Hume's Warbler was recorded at Knockadoon Head, the first record of this bird in Ireland.
