= Easkey Bog =

Blanket bog, national nature reserve, and Ramsar site

- Interactive map of Easkey Bog
- Location: County Sligo, Ireland
- Coordinates: 54°11′13″N 8°48′40″W
- Area: 1,500 acres (6.1 km^{2})
- Governing body: National Parks and Wildlife Service

Ramsar Wetland
- Official name: Easky Bog
- Designated: 30 May 1990
- Reference no.: 471

Easkey Bog is a blanket bog, national nature reserve, and Ramsar site of approximately 1,500 acres (6.1 km^{2}) in County Sligo, Ireland.

== Features ==
Easkey or Easky Bog was legally protected as a national nature reserve by the Irish government in 1990. In 1990, the site was also declared a Ramsar site (number 471). A large portion of the bog has been designated as being of international scientific interest.

The reserve contains the Cowagh River headwaters and a large plateau of highland blanket bog, with wet heath and mountain blanket bog on the steep slopes of the Ox Mountains. There is a wide variety of habitats, including quaking areas, streams, pools, flushes, heath slopes, and rock and peat lakes. Easkey Bog is one of a small number of large areas of intermediate blanket bog in Ireland, encompassing both lowland and mountain blanket bog. It contains all three types of blanket bog within close proximity. The reserve is home to red grouse and curlews, and the European golden plover overwinters there. There is also a population of Irish hare. A small flock of Greenland white-fronted geese migrates to the area in winter.
