= Rosturra Wood =

National nature reserve and conservation area in County Galway, Ireland

- Coill Ros Dora
- Location within Ireland
- Type: National
- Location: near Woodford, County Galway
- Coordinates: 53°03′36″N 8°21′14″W
- Area: 44 acres (17.81 ha)
- Operator: National Parks and Wildlife Service (Ireland)
- Status: Open all year

Rosturra Wood (Irish: Coill Ros Dora) is a national nature reserve and Special Area of Conservation of approximately 44 acres (0.18 km^{2}) located near Woodford, County Galway, Ireland. It is managed by the Irish National Parks & Wildlife Service.

== Features ==
Rosturra Wood was legally protected as a national nature reserve by the Irish government in 1983. It is also a Special Area of Conservation for its old sessile oak woodland.

Rosturra Wood is a semi-natural woodland of ash and oak, which along with Derrycrag and Pollnaknockaun Wood, represent fragments of the previously extensive oak and ash forests which dominated the local landscape for hundreds of years. There is an under planting of hazel, holly, as well as blackthorn, buckthorn, guelder rose, hawthorn, spindle-tree and willow. The rare long-leaved helleborine has been recorded there, with wood anemone, dog violet, bilberry, bramble, primrose, and woodrush. Among the fauna recorded include pine marten, fallow deer, coal tits, mistle thrush, and treecreepers. Recorded invertebrates include brimstones, ringlets, and silver-washed fritillary. Rosturra Wood is one of the Millennium Forests. The wood includes a rath or ringfort and a well called "Toberphuca".
