= List of electoral wards in Warwickshire =

This is a list of electoral divisions and wards in the ceremonial county of Warwickshire in the West Midlands. All changes since the re-organisation of local government following the passing of the Local Government Act 1972 are shown. The number of councillors elected for each electoral division or ward is shown in brackets.

== County council ==
=== Warwickshire ===
Electoral Divisions from 1 April 1974 (first election 12 April 1973) to 7 May 1981:

1. Alcester (1)
2. Atherstone (1)
3. Baddesley Ensor (1)
4. Bedworth No. 1 (2)
5. Bedworth No. 2 (1)
6. Bedworth No. 3 (1)
7. Bedworth No. 4 (1)
8. Brailes (1)
9. Cubbington (1)
10. Dunchurch (1)
11. Fenny Compton (1)
12. Hartshill (1)
13. Kenilworth No. 1 (1)
14. Kenilworth No. 2 (1)
15. Kingsbury (1)
16. Lawford (1)
17. Leamington Spa No. 1 (1)
18. Leamington Spa No. 2 (1)
19. Leamington Spa No. 3 (1)
20. Leamington Spa No. 4 (1)
21. Leamington Spa No. 5 (1)
22. Meriden No. 1 (Arley) (1)
23. Meriden No. 2 (Coleshill) (1)
24. Meriden No. 3 (Water Orton) (1)
25. Nuneaton No. 1 (1)
26. Nuneaton No. 2 (1)
27. Nuneaton No. 3 (1)
28. Nuneaton No. 4 (1)
29. Nuneaton No. 5 (1)
30. Nuneaton No. 6 (1)
31. Nuneaton No. 7 (1)
32. Nuneaton No. 8 (1)
33. Pailton (1)
34. Polesworth (1)
35. Rowington (1)
36. Rugby No. 1 (1)
37. Rugby No. 2 (1)
38. Rugby No. 3 (1)
39. Rugby No. 4 (1)
40. Rugby No. 5 (1)
41. Rugby No. 6 (1)
42. Rugby No. 7 (1)
43. Shipston-on-Stour (1)
44. Southam (1)
45. Stratford upon Avon No. 1 (1)
46. Stratford upon Avon No. 2 (1)
47. Stratford upon Avon Rural No. 1 (Wo (1)
48. Stratford upon Avon Rural No. 2 (Ar (1)
49. Stratford upon Avon Rural No. 3 (Av (1)
50. Stratford upon Avon Rural No. 4 (We (1)
51. Studley (1)
52. Warwick No. 1 (1)
53. Warwick No. 2 (1)
54. Whitnash (1)

Electoral Divisions from 7 May 1981 to 5 May 2005:

1. Alcester (1)
2. Arley (1)
3. Atherstone (1)
4. Baddesley Ensor (1)
5. Bedworth Bulkington (1)
6. Bedworth Exhall (1)
7. Bedworth Heath (1)
8. Bedworth Mount Pleasant (1)
9. Bedworth Poplar (1)
10. Bidford-on-Avon (1)
11. Coleshill (1)
12. Cubbington (1)
13. Dunchurch (1)
14. Earl Craven (1)
15. Fosse (1)
16. Harbury (1)
17. Hartshill (1)
18. Henley-in-Arden (1)
19. Kenilworth Abbey (1)
20. Kenilworth St Johns (1)
21. Kenilworth Stoneleigh (1)
22. Kineton (1)
23. Kingsbury (1)
24. Leamington Brunswick (1)
25. Leamington Clarendon (1)
26. Leamington Crown (1)
27. Leamington Manor (1)
28. Leamington Milverton (1)
29. Leamington Willes (1)
30. Nuneaton Abbey (1)
31. Nuneaton Arbury (1)
32. Nuneaton Attleborough (1)
33. Nuneaton Camp Hill (1)
34. Nuneaton Chilvers Coton (1)
35. Nuneaton Galley Common (1)
36. Nuneaton St Nicolas (1)
37. Nuneaton Stockingford (1)
38. Nuneaton Weddington (1)
39. Nuneaton Whitestone (1)
40. Polesworth (1)
41. Rowington (1)
42. Rugby Bilton (1)
43. Rugby Caldicott (1)
44. Rugby Central (1)
45. Rugby Eastlands (1)
46. Rugby Hillmorton (1)
47. Rugby North (1)
48. Rugby Overslade (1)
49. Rugby West (1)
50. Shipston-on-Stour (1)
51. Southam (1)
52. Stratford upon Avon North (1)
53. Stratford upon Avon South (1)
54. Stratford upon Avon West (1)
55. Studley (1)
56. Warwick North (1)
57. Warwick South (1)
58. Warwick West (1)
59. Water Orton (1)
60. Wellesbourne (1)
61. Whitnash (1)
62. Wootton Wawen (1)

Electoral Divisions from 5 May 2005 to 4 May 2017:

1. Admirals (1)
2. Alcester (1) †
3. Arbury & Stockingford (2)
4. Arley (1)
5. Aston Cantlow (1) †
6. Atherstone (1)
7. Baddesley (1)
8. Bede (1)
9. Bedworth North (1)
10. Bedworth West (1)
11. Bidford-on-Avon (1)
12. Bishop’s Tachbrook (1) †
13. Brownsover (2)
14. Bulkington (1)
15. Caldecott (2)
16. Coleshill (1)
17. Cubbington (1) †
18. Dunchurch (1)
19. Earl Craven (1)
20. Eastlands & Hillmorton (2)
21. Feldon (1)
22. Fosse (1)
23. Hartshill (1)
24. Henley-in-Arden (1)
25. Kenilworth Abbey (1)
26. Kenilworth Park Hill (1) †
27. Kenilworth St John's (1)
28. Kineton (1)
29. Kingsbury (1)
30. Lawford & New Bilton (1)
31. Leamington Brunswick (1)
32. Leamington Milverton (1)
33. Leamington North (2)
34. Leamington Willes (1) †
35. Leek Wootton (1) †
36. Nuneaton Abbey (1)
37. Nuneaton Camp Hill (1)
38. Nuneaton Galley Common (1)
39. Nuneaton St Nicolas (1)
40. Nuneaton Weddington (1)
41. Nuneaton Wem Brook (1)
42. Nuneaton Whitestone (1)
43. Polesworth (1)
44. Poplar (1)
45. Shipston-on-Stour (1)
46. Southam (1)
47. Stour & The Vale (1) †
48. Stratford Avenue & New Town (1)
49. Stratford South (2)
50. Studley (1)
51. Warwick North (1) †
52. Warwick South (1) †
53. Warwick West (1) †
54. Water Orton (1)
55. Wellesbourne (1) †
56. Whitnash (1) †

† minor boundary changes in 2009

Electoral Divisions from 4 May 2017 to present:

1. Admirals & Cawston (1)
2. Alcester (1)
3. Arbury (1)
4. Arden (1)
5. Atherstone (1)
6. Attleborough (1)
7. Baddesley & Dordon (1)
8. Bedworth Central (1)
9. Bedworth East (1)
10. Bedworth North (1)
11. Bedworth West (1)
12. Benn (1)
13. Bidford & Welford (1)
14. Bilton & Hillside (1)
15. Brownsover & Coton Park (1)
16. Budbrooke & Bishop’s Tachbrook (1)
17. Bulkington & Whitestone (1)
18. Camp Hill (1)
19. Coleshill North & Water Orton (1)
20. Coleshill South & Arley (1)
21. Cubbington & Leek Wootton (1)
22. Dunsmore & Leam Valley (1)
23. Earl Craven (1)
24. Eastlands (1)
25. Feldon (1)
26. Fosse (1)
27. Galley Common (1)
28. Hartshill & Mancetter (1)
29. Hillmorton (1)
30. Kenilworth Park Hill (1)
31. Kenilworth St John’s (1)
32. Kineton & Red Horse (1)
33. Kingsbury (1)
34. Lapworth & West Kenilworth (1)
35. Leamington Brunswick (1)
36. Leamington Clarendon (1)
37. Leamington Milverton (1)
38. Leamington North (1)
39. Leamington Willes (1)
40. New Bilton & Overslade (1)
41. Nuneaton Abbey (1)
42. Nuneaton East (1)
43. Polesworth (1)
44. Shipston (1)
45. Southam, Stockton & Napton (1)
46. Stockingford (1)
47. Stour & The Vale (1)
48. Stratford North (1)
49. Stratford South (1)
50. Stratford West (1)
51. Studley (1)
52. Warwick North (1)
53. Warwick South (1)
54. Warwick West (1)
55. Weddington (1)
56. Wellesbourne (1)
57. Whitnash (1)

== District councils ==
=== North Warwickshire ===
Wards from 1 April 1974 (first election 7 June 1973) to 3 May 1979:

Wards from 3 May 1979 to 1 May 2003:

Wards from 1 May 2003 to present:

1. Arley & Whitacre (3)
2. Atherstone Central (2)
3. Atherstone North (2)
4. Atherstone South & Mancetter (2)
5. Baddesley & Grendon (2)
6. Coleshill North (2)
7. Coleshill South (2)
8. Curdworth (2)
9. Dordon (2)
10. Fillongley (2)
11. Hartshill (2)
12. Hurley & Wood End (2)
13. Kingsbury (2)
14. Newton Regis & Warton (2)
15. Polesworth East (2)
16. Polesworth West (2)
17. Water Orton (2)

=== Nuneaton and Bedworth ===
Wards from 1 April 1974 (first election 7 June 1973) to 3 May 1979:

Wards from 3 May 1979 to 2 May 2002:

Wards from 2 May 2002 to 2 May 2024:

1. Abbey (2)
2. Arbury (2)
3. Attleborough (2)
4. Bar Pool (2)
5. Bede (2)
6. Bulkington (2)
7. Camp Hill (2)
8. Exhall (2)
9. Galley Common (2)
10. Heath (2)
11. Kingswood (2)
12. Poplar (2)
13. St Nicolas (2)
14. Slough (2)
15. Weddington (2)
16. Wem Brook (2)
17. Whitestone (2)

Wards from 2 May 2024 to present:

1. Arbury (2)
2. Attleborough (2)
3. Bede (2)
4. Bulkington (2)
5. Camp Hill (2)
6. Chilvers Coton (2)
7. Eastboro (2)
8. Exhall (2)
9. Galley Common (2)
10. Heath (2)
11. Milby (2)
12. Poplar (2)
13. Slough (2)
14. St Mary’s (2)
15. St Nicolas (2)
16. Stockingford East (2)
17. Stockingford West (2)
18. Weddington (2)
19. Whitestone (2)

=== Rugby ===
Wards from 1 April 1974 (first election 7 June 1973) to 3 May 1979:

Wards from 3 May 1979 to 2 May 2002:

Wards from 2 May 2002 to 3 May 2012:

1. Admirals (3) †
2. Avon & Swift (2) †
3. Benn (3)
4. Bilton (3)
5. Brownsover North (2) †
6. Brownsover South (2)
7. Caldecott (3)
8. Dunchurch & Knightlow (3) †
9. Earl Craven & Wolston (3)
10. Eastlands (3)
11. Fosse (2)
12. Hillmorton (3)
13. Lawford & King’s Newnham (2)
14. Leam Valley (1)
15. New Bilton (3)
16. Newbold (3)
17. Overslade (3)
18. Paddox (2)
19. Ryton-on-Dunsmore (1)
20. Wolvey (1)

† minor boundary changes in 2007

Wards from 3 May 2012 to present:

1. Admirals & Cawston (3) †
2. Benn (3)
3. Bilton (3)
4. Clifton, Newton & Churchover (1)
5. Coton & Boughton (3)
6. Dunsmore (3) †
7. Hillmorton (3)
8. Leam Valley (1)
9. New Bilton (3)
10. Newbold & Brownsover (3)
11. Rokeby & Overslade (3)
12. Paddox (3)
13. Revel & Binley Woods (3)
14. St Cross (3); renamed Eastlands in 2012
15. Wolston & the Lawfords (3) †
16. Wolvey & Shilton (1)

† minor boundary changes in 2015

=== Stratford-on-Avon ===
Wards from 1 April 1974 (first election 7 June 1973) to 3 May 1979:

Wards from 3 May 1979 to 2 May 2002:

Wards from 2 May 2002 to 7 May 2015:

1. Alcester (3)
2. Aston Cantlow (1)
3. Bardon (1) †
4. Bidford & Salford (3) †
5. Brailes (1)
6. Burton Dassett (1) †
7. Claverdon (1)
8. Ettington (1) †
9. Fenny Compton (1)
10. Harbury (2)
11. Henley (2) †
12. Kineton (2) †
13. Kinwarton (1) †
14. Long Compton (1)
15. Long Itchington (1)
16. Quinton (1)
17. Sambourne (1)
18. Shipston (2)
19. Snitterfield (1) †
20. Southam (3)
21. Stockton & Napton (1)
22. Stratford Alveston (3)
23. Stratford Avenue & New Town (3)
24. Stratford Guild & Hathaway (3)
25. Stratford Mount Pleasant (2)
26. Studley (3)
27. Tanworth (2) †
28. Tredington (1)
29. Vale of the Red Horse (1)
30. Welford (1) †
31. Wellesbourne (3) †

† minor boundary changes in 2008

Wards from 7 May 2015 to 4 May 2023:

1. Alcester Town (1)
2. Alcester & Rural (1)
3. Avenue (1)
4. Bidford East (1)
5. Bidford West & Salford (1)
6. Bishop’s Itchington (1)
7. Bishopton (1)
8. Brailes & Compton (1)
9. Bridgetown (1)
10. Clopton (1)
11. Ettington (1)
12. Guildhall (1)
13. Harbury (1)
14. Hathaway (1)
15. Henley-in-Arden (1)
16. Kineton (1)
17. Kinwarton (1)
18. Long Itchington & Stockton (1)
19. Napton & Fenny Compton (1)
20. Quinton (1)
21. Red Horse (1)
22. Shipston North (1)
23. Shipston South (1)
24. Shottery (1)
25. Snitterfield (1)
26. Southam North (1)
27. Southam South (1)
28. Studley with Mappleborough Green (1)
29. Studley with Sambourne (1)
30. Tanworth-in-Arden (1)
31. Tiddington (1)
32. Welcombe (1)
33. Welford-on-Avon (1)
34. Wellesbourne East (1)
35. Wellesbourne West (1)
36. Wotton Wawen (1)

Wards from 4 May 2023 to present:

1. Alcester East (1)
2. Alcester West (1)
3. Bidford East (1)
4. Bidford West (1)
5. Bishop’s Itchington, Fenny Compton & Napton (2)
6. Brailes & Compton (1)
7. Claverdon & Snitterfield (1)
8. Gaydon, Kineton & Upper Lighthorne (2)
9. Harbury (1)
10. Henley-in-Arden (1)
11. Kinwarton (1)
12. Long Marston (1)
13. Quinton (1)
14. Salford Priors & Alcester Rural (1)
15. Shipston North (1)
16. Shipston South (1)
17. Southam East, Central & Stockton (1)
18. Southam North & Long Itchington (1)
19. Southam South (1)
20. Southam West (1)
21. Stratford Avenue (1)
22. Stratford Bishopton (1)
23. Stratford Clopton (1)
24. Stratford Guildhall & Bridgetown (1)

Stratford Hathaway (1)

1. Stratford Orchard Hill (1)
2. Stratford Shottery (1)
3. Stratford Tiddington (1)
4. Stratford Welcombe (1)
5. Studley North (1)
6. Studley South (1)
7. Tanworth-in-Arden (1)
8. Tredington (1)
9. Tysoe (1)
10. Welford-on-Avon (1)
11. Wellesbourne East & Rural (1)
12. Wellesbourne North & Rural (1)
13. Wellesbourne South (1)
14. Wootton Wawen (1)

=== Warwick ===
Wards from 1 April 1974 (first election 7 June 1973) to 5 May 1983:

Wards from 5 May 1983 to 1 May 2003:

Wards from 1 May 2003 to 7 May 2015:

1. Abbey (3)
2. Bishop’s Tachbrook (1) †
3. Brunswick (3)
4. Budbrooke (2) †
5. Clarendon (2)
6. Crown (2)
7. Cubbington (2)
8. Lapworth (1)
9. Leek Wootton (1)
10. Manor (3)
11. Milverton (3)
12. Park Hill (3) †
13. Radford Semele (1)
14. St John's (3)
15. Stoneleigh (1) †
16. Warwick North (3) †
17. Warwick South (3) †
18. Warwick West (3) †
19. Whitnash (3) †
20. Willes (3) †

† minor boundary changes in 2007

Wards from 7 May 2015 to 2 May 2019:

1. Abbey (3)
2. Arden (2)
3. Aylesford (2)
4. Bishop’s Tachbrook (1)
5. Brunswick (2)
6. Budbrooke (2)
7. Clarendon (2)
8. Crown (2)
9. Emscote (2)
10. Leam (2)
11. Manor (2)
12. Milverton (2)
13. Myton & Heathcote (2)
14. Newbold (2)
15. Park Hill (3)
16. Radford Semele (1)
17. Saltisford (2)
18. St John’s (3)
19. Stoneleigh & Cubbington (2)
20. Sydenham (2)
21. Whitnash (3)
22. Woodloes (2)

Wards from 2 May 2019 to present:

1. Bishop’s Tachbrook (2)
2. Budbrooke (2)
3. Cubbington & Leek Wootton (2)
4. Kenilworth Abbey & Arden (3)
5. Kenilworth Park Hill (3)
6. Kenilworth St John’s (3)
7. Leamington Brunswick (3)
8. Leamington Clarendon (3)
9. Leamington Lillington (3)
10. Leamington Milverton (3)
11. Leamington Willes (3)
12. Radford Semele (1)
13. Warwick All Saints & Woodloes (3)
14. Warwick Aylesford (2)
15. Warwick Myton & Heathcote (3)
16. Warwick Saltisford (2)
17. Whitnash (3)

== Electoral wards by constituency ==
Wards as they existed on 1 December 2020.

=== Kenilworth and Southam ===
Rugby: Dunsmore; Leam Valley.

Stratford-on-Avon: Bishop’s Itchington; Harbury; Kineton; Long Itchington & Stockton; Napton & Fenny Compton; Red Horse; Southam North; Southam South; Wellesbourne East; Wellesbourne West.

Warwick: Budbrooke; Cubbington & Leek Wootton; Kenilworth Abbey & Arden; Kenilworth Park Hill; Kenilworth St. John’s.

=== North Warwickshire and Bedworth ===
North Warwickshire: Atherstone Central; Atherstone North; Atherstone South & Mancetter; Baddesley & Grendon; Coleshill North; Coleshill South; Curdworth; Dordon; Fillongley; Hurley & Wood End; Kingsbury; Newton Regis & Warton; Polesworth East; Polesworth West; Water Orton.

Nuneaton and Bedworth: Bede; Exhall; Heath; Poplar; Slough.

=== Nuneaton ===
North Warwickshire: Arley & Whitacre; Hartshill.

Nuneaton and Bedworth: Abbey; Arbury; Attleborough; Bar Pool; Camp Hill; Galley Common; Kingswood; St. Nicolas; Weddington; Wem Brook; Whitestone.

=== Rugby ===
Nuneaton and Bedworth: Bulkington.

Rugby: Admirals & Cawston; Benn; Bilton; Clifton, Newton & Churchover; Coton & Boughton; Eastlands; Hillmorton; New Bilton; Newbold & Brownsover; Paddox; Revel & Binley Woods; Rokeby & Overslade; Wolston & the Lawfords; Wolvey & Shilton.

=== Stratford-on-Avon ===
Stratford-on-Avon: Alcester & Rural; Alcester Town; Avenue; Bidford East; Bidford West & Salford; Bishopton; Brailes & Compton; Bridgetown; Clopton; Ettington; Guildhall; Hathaway; Henley-in-Arden; Kinwarton; Quinton; Shipston North; Shipston South; Shottery; Snitterfield; Studley with Mappleborough Green; Studley with Sambourne; Tanworth-in-Arden; Tiddington; Welcombe; Welford-on-Avon; Wotton Wawen.

=== Warwick and Leamington ===
Warwick: Bishop’s Tachbrook; Leamington Brunswick; Leamington Clarendon; Leamington Lillington; Leamington Milverton; Leamington Willes; Radford Semele; Warwick All Saints & Woodloes; Warwick Aylesford; Warwick Myton & Heathcote; Warwick Saltisford; Whitnash.

== See also ==
- List of parliamentary constituencies in Warwickshire
