= Meenachullion Bog =

Meenachullion
- Interactive map of Meenachullion
- Location: County Donegal, Ireland
- Coordinates: 54°54′14″N 8°07′16″W
- Area: 479 acres (1.94 km^{2})
- Governing body: National Parks and Wildlife Service

Designations

Ramsar Wetland
- Designated: 30 May 1990
- Reference no.: 475

Meenachullion is a blanket bog, Ramsar site and national nature reserve of approximately 479 acres (1.94 km^{2}) in County Donegal.

== Features ==
Meenachullion was legally protected as a national nature reserve by the Irish government in 1990. In 1990, the site was also declared Ramsar site number 475.

Meenachullion is a lowland blanket bog, with vegetation that transitions into fen and wet grassy heath as it meets the slopes of Gubben Hill. On the flat top of the Hill there are small, eroded areas of highland blanket bog. The reserve also includes a part of the headwaters of a Gweebarra River tributary. A number of bird species use the reserve as a breeding site, and a small flock of Anser albifrons flavirostris overwinter on the reserve.
