= Ballynastaig Wood =

Nature reserve in County Galway, Ireland

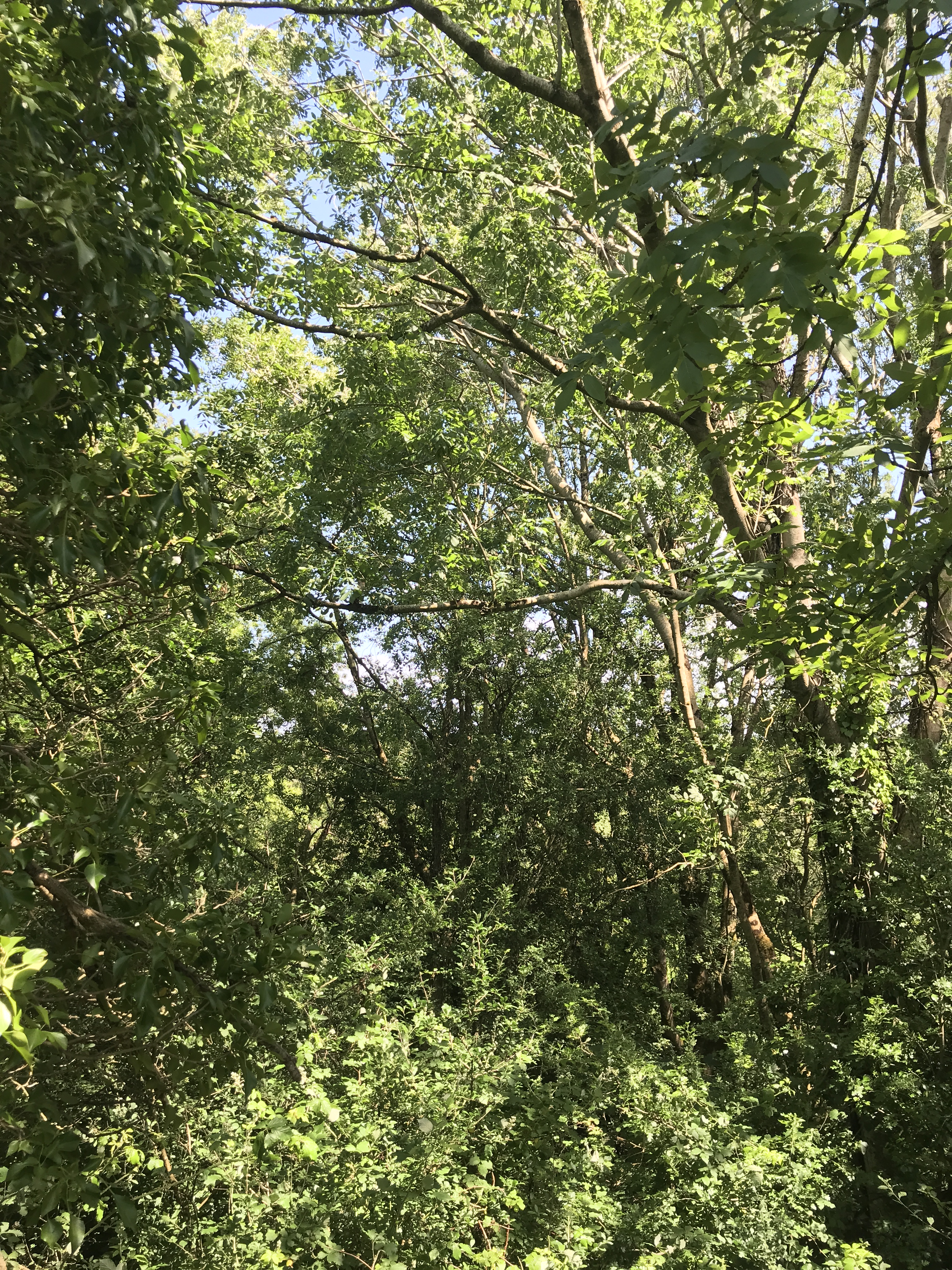
- Trees in Ballynastaig Wood

- Location within Ireland
- Interactive map of Ballynastaig Wood
- Type: National
- Location: County Galway
- Coordinates: 53°05′49″N 8°51′50″W
- Area: 25 acres (10.12 ha)
- Operator: National Parks and Wildlife Service (Ireland)

Ballynastaig Wood is a nature reserve of approximately 25 acres (0.10 km^{2}) in County Galway, Ireland. Ballynastaig Wood Nature Reserve was legally protected by the Irish government in 1983. It is located close to Coole Park, and shares some of the same characteristics. The woods consist of ash, alder-hawthorn, and yew wood.
