= The Raven Nature Reserve =

Nature reserve in County Wexford, Ireland

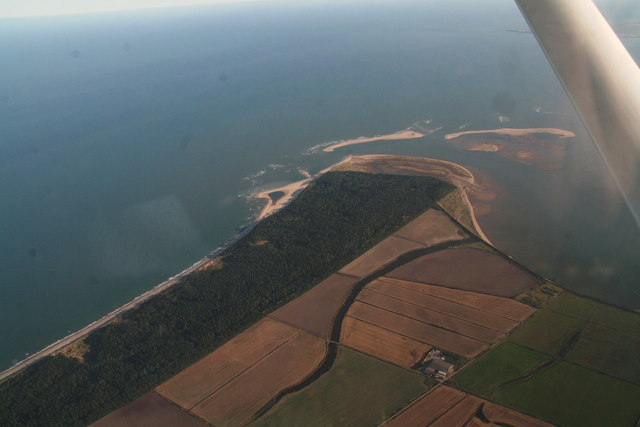
- Aerial shot of The Raven in 2015

- Location within Ireland
- Type: National
- Location: County Wexford
- Coordinates: 52°21′32″N 6°22′01″W
- Area: 1,455.5 acres (589.02 ha)
- Operator: National Parks and Wildlife Service (Ireland)
- Status: Open all year

Ramsar Wetland
- Official name: The Raven
- Designated: 31 July 1986
- Reference no.: 333

The Raven Nature Reserve is a Ramsar site and national nature reserve of approximately 1,455.5 acres (5.890 km^{2}) located in County Wexford, Ireland. It is managed by the Irish National Parks & Wildlife Service.

== Features ==
The Raven Nature Reserve was legally protected as a national nature reserve by the Irish government in 1983. In 1986, the site was also declared Ramsar site number 333. The area is also a Special Area of Conservation and a Special Protection Area.

The land on which The Raven is located was originally a long narrow sand spit which sheltered the entrance of the Wexford Harbour. When the North Slob was created in the mid 19th century, the area was landlocked on its western side. The name Raven comes from the Irish Rabhainn meaning spade shaped piece of land, which refers to the sand spit and its former shape. The area is now one part of a large system of sand dunes, with lagoons and a sand bar on the southern tip.

Along with the North Slob, The Raven is home to 35% of the world's population of Greenland and White-fronted Geese who over-winter there. The birds feed at the Slob during the day, and roost on The Raven's sand bar at night. It is also home to large numbers of wading birds who live there year round. Other birds recorded there include crossbills and little terns. There is a rich flora on the reserve with rare species such as round-leaved wintergreen, which is not found anywhere else in Ireland. A wide variety of butterflies can be seen in the reserve also.

It is thought that the family who owned the land during the 19th century, the Tooles of Curracloe House, began planting the trees on the site, which today is predominately conifers such as Corsican Pine. There is a population of red squirrels on the reserve, supported by the pine cones of the tree plantation. Due to the presence of pine martens, grey squirrels have not established there.
