= Owenboy (nature reserve) =

Nature reserve and Ramsar site in County Mayo, Ireland

- Interactive map of Owenboy
- Location: County Mayo, Ireland
- Coordinates: 54°05′35″N 9°27′36″W
- Area: 981 acres (3.97 km^{2})
- Governing body: National Parks and Wildlife Service

Designations

Ramsar Wetland
- Designated: 1 June 1987
- Reference no.: 371

Owenboy is a national nature reserve and Ramsar site of approximately 981 acres (3.97 km^{2}) in County Mayo.

== Features ==
Owenboy was legally protected as a national nature reserve by the Irish government in 1986. In 1987, the site was also declared Ramsar site number 371.

The reserve contains an extensive lowland intermediate bog in a broad basin, with some low domes which resemble raised bog. There are also numerous pools, flushes, subterranean and surface streams, swallowholes, and spring-fed fens. A rare species of moss has been recorded on the site. The Greenland white-fronted goose uses the area as a winter feeding site.
