= Pollnaknockaun Wood =

Nature reserve and conservation area in County Galway, Ireland

Pollnaknockaun Wood Nature Reserve
- Anaclann Dúlra Choill Pholl na gCnocán
- Location within Ireland
- Type: National
- Location: near Woodford, County Galway
- Coordinates: 53°03′47″N 8°23′17″W
- Area: 96 acres (38.85 ha)
- Operator: National Parks and Wildlife Service (Ireland)
- Status: Open all year

Pollnaknockaun Wood Nature Reserve (Irish: Anaclann Dúlra Choill Pholl na gCnocán) is a national nature reserve and Special Area of Conservation of approximately 96 acres (0.39 km^{2}) located near Woodford, County Galway, Ireland. It is managed by the Irish National Parks & Wildlife Service.

== Features ==
Pollnaknockaun Wood was legally protected as a national nature reserve by the Irish government in 1983. It is also a Special Area of Conservation for its old sessile oak woodland.

Pollnaknockaun Wood is a semi-natural woodland, which along with Derrycrag and Rosturra Wood, represent fragments of the previously extensive oak and ash forests which dominated the local landscape for hundreds of years. The geology of the site is old red sandstone. Parts of the wood were felled in the 1930s and 1940s and replanted with commercial conifers. Most of these trees have now been removed, and the old woodland allowed to regenerate. There is a variety of fauna including jays and fallow deer.
