= Blanket bog =

Area of peatland

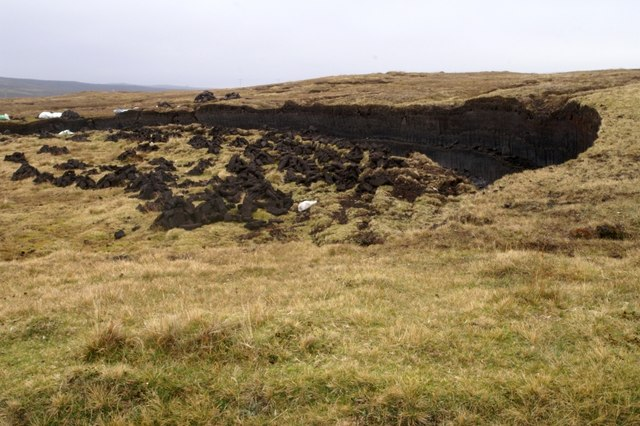
Blanket bog on Yell, Shetland Islands, with some peat working

Blanket bog in the Scottish Highlands, 2024

Blanket bog or blanket mire, or also known as featherbed bog, is an area of peatland, forming where there is a climate of high rainfall and a low level of evapotranspiration, allowing peat to develop not only in wet hollows but over large expanses of undulating ground. The blanketing of the ground with a variable depth of peat gives the habitat type its name.

The current distribution of blanket bogs globally remains unknown but they are found extensively throughout the Northern Hemisphere. Well-studied examples are found in Ireland and Scotland, but vast areas of North American tundra also qualify as blanket bogs. In Europe, the southernmost edge of range of this habitat has been recently mapped in the Cantabrian Mountains of northern Spain.

In the Southern Hemisphere, they are less well-developed due to the relatively low latitudes of the main land areas, though similar environments are reported in Patagonia, the Falkland Islands and New Zealand. The blanket bogs known as 'featherbeds' on subantarctic Macquarie Island occur on raised marine terraces; they may be up to 5 m (16 ft) deep, tremble or quake when walked on and can be hazardous to cross. It is doubtful whether the extremely impoverished flora of Antarctica is sufficiently well developed to be considered as blanket bogs.

In some areas of Europe, the spread of blanket bogs is traced to deforestation by prehistoric cultures.

== Peat harvesting ==
In many areas, peat is used as a fossil fuel for electricity generation or as a domestic solid fuel for heating. In the Republic of Ireland, a state-owned company, Bord na Móna, owns large areas of bogland and, until 2020, harvested peat for electricity generation.

== See also ==
- String bog
