= Western Getterön Nature Reserve =

Nature reserve in Halland, Sweden

- Västra Getteröns naturreservat
- IUCN category IV (habitat/species management area)
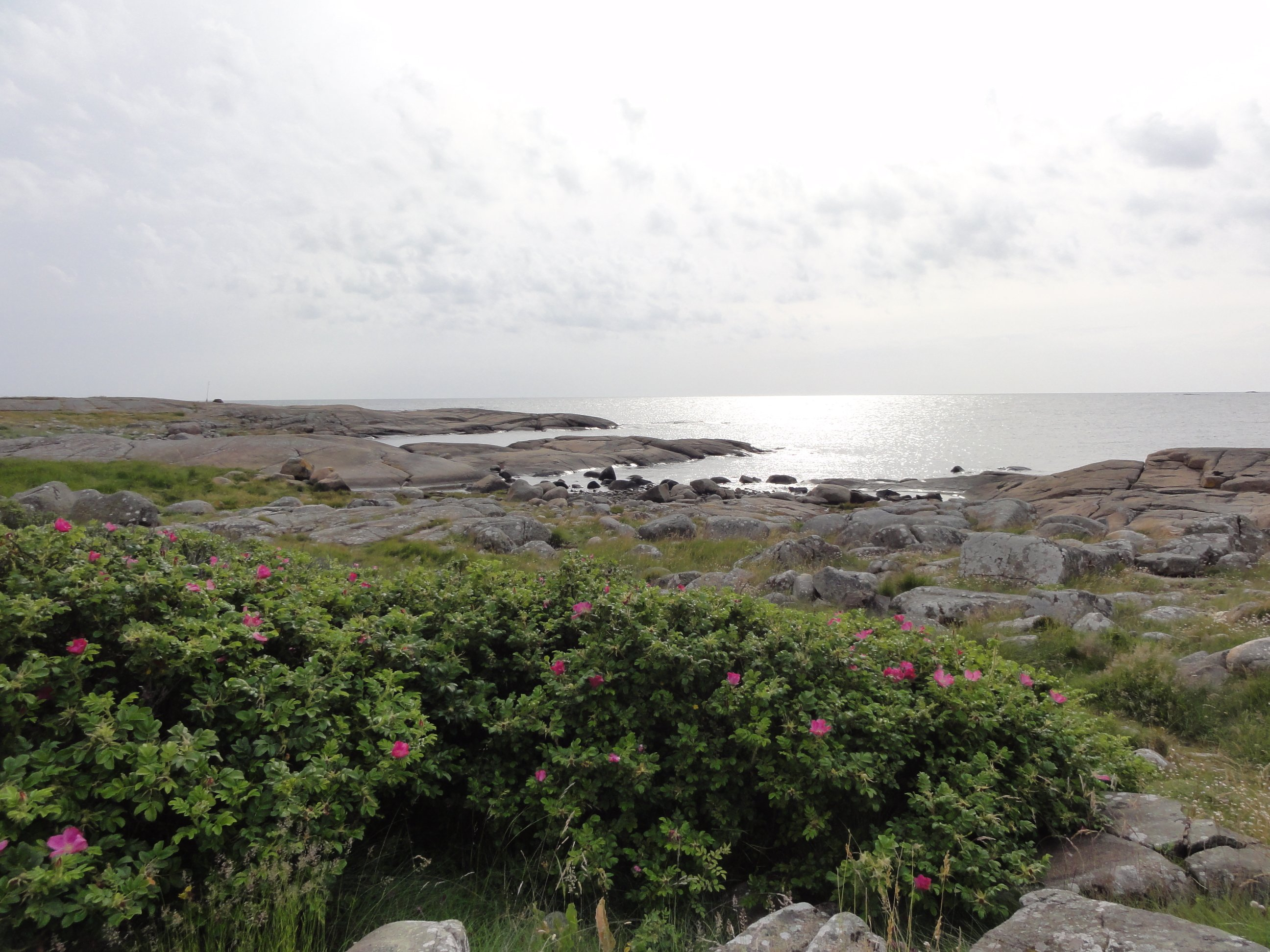
- Getteron1
- Interactive map of Western Getterön Nature Reserve
- Coordinates: 57°7′8.74″N 12°11′38.28″E

Western Getterön Nature Reserve (Swedish: Västra Getteröns naturreservat) is a nature reserve at the westernmost part of Getterön in Varberg Municipality, Sweden. It consists of a peninsula which is popularly known as Stora Gubbanäsan ("The Great Old Man's Nose"), and the surrounding part of the Kattegat. The nature reserve has an area of 183 hectares, of which 53 are land. It was established in 1974.

== Geology ==
The landscape of the nature reserve was formed after the last Ice Age when the ice sheet retreated. Within the area there are several giant's kettles. The bedrock consists of charnockite. The rock is also called Varberg granite and is rare in Sweden, except for on the coast of Halland.

== Flora and fauna ==
In the nature reserve, there are plant species like bladder campion, harebell, Armeria maritima, sea kale, Glaux, Seriphidium maritimum, sea sandwort, and Gentianella uliginosa. The shore meadows of Western Getterön were used for grazing until the mid-1960s. When the grazing stopped, the landscape didn't grow to, because of the thin soil. Since 1998, the area is used for grazing again. Western Getterön is also a birdwatching site, mostly for seabirds and migratory birds, even if Getterön Nature Reserve on the other side of Getterön is more well-known and situated closer to Varberg. Northern gannet, northern fulmar, auks, parasitic jaeger, and European storm-petrel are some species that have been observed at Western Getterön.
