= List of shipwrecks in December 1852 =

The list of shipwrecks in December 1852 includes ships sunk, foundered, wrecked, grounded, or otherwise lost during December 1852.

== 1 December ==
List of shipwrecks: 1 December 1852
Ship	State	Description
Black Hawk	(United Kingdom of Great Britain and Ireland) British North America	The schooner was lost on this date. She was on a voyage from the Annapolis River to Saint Andrews, New Brunswick.
Comorn	United Kingdom	The ship ran aground and was damaged on the Whitton Sand, in the North Sea off the coast of Lincolnshire.
Emerald	(United Kingdom of Great Britain and Ireland) British North America	The schooner was lost on this date. She was on a voyage from the Annapolis River to Saint Andrew, New Brunswick.
Gazelle	(United Kingdom of Great Britain and Ireland) British North America	The ship was lost between Brier Island and "Laetite", Nova Scotia with the loss of four of her crew.
Grafen von Bismark	Prussia	The ship was wrecked at "Rotbøll", Denmark. Her crew were rescued. She was on a voyage from Newcastle upon Tyne, Northumberland, United Kingdom to Wolgast.
Hartford	United Kingdom	The brig was driven ashore at Whitburn, County Durham. She was refloated and taken in to South Shields, County Durham.
Hazard	United States	The ship was wrecked on Grand Manan, New Brunswick, British North America with the loss of all hands.
Lalla Rookh	United Kingdom	The ship was driven ashore and feared wrecked at Gibraltar. (Note: The source says: "Gibraltar, December 16th. The Lalla Rookh, for England, was driven on shore on the 1st inst. and it is feared will be a wreck". It is not known which Lalla Rookh this was.)
Samoset	United States	The ship was wrecked at Fort Point, California. She was on a voyage from New York to San Francisco, California.
Themis	France	The ship was wrecked at Grand-Bassam, Ivory Coast. Her crew were rescued. She was on a voyage from Grand-Bassam to Calais.

== 2 December ==
List of shipwrecks: 2 December 1852
Ship	State	Description
Active	United Kingdom	The sloop was driven ashore in Macrihanish Bay. Her crew were rescued. She became a wreck on 10 December.
Bachelor	United Kingdom	The ship ran aground in the River Severn at Berkeley Pill, Gloucestershire. She was on a voyage from Quebec City, Province of Canada, British North America to Gloucester.
Eliza	(United Kingdom of Great Britain and Ireland) British North America	The ship was wrecked near Granville, Nova Scotia. She was on a voyage from Saint Andrew, New Brunswick to Cornwallis, Nova Scotia.
Jane and Mary	United Kingdom	The ship was driven onto the Ware Rocks, off the coast of Devon and damaged. She was on a voyage from Newport, Monmouthshire to Plymouth, Devon. She was refloated on 7 December and beached at Appledore.
Sarah	United Kingdom	The sloop was wrecked in Hilpsford Bay, Lancashire. Her crew were rescued.

== 3 December ==
List of shipwrecks: December 1852
Ship	State	Description
Charles Elliott	(United Kingdom of Great Britain and Ireland) Saint Lucia	The schooner was driven ashore and wrecked at George Town.
Georgia	United Kingdom	The ship was driven ashore and broke in two at Tuckerton, New Jersey, United States. Her crew were rescued. She was on a voyage from Liverpool, Lancashire to New York, United States.
Hostelina	United Kingdom	The ship was driven ashore at Cape Janissary, Ottoman Empire. She was on a voyage from Brăila, Ottoman Empire to a Britiah port.
Jane A. Milvain	United Kingdom	The brig ran aground on the Haisborough Sands, in the North Sea off the coast of Norfolk and sank. Her crew were rescued. She was on a voyage from South Shields, County Durham to London.
Spray	United Kingdom	The ship ran aground on the Gunfleet Sand, in the North Sea off the coast of Essex. She was on a voyage from South Shields to London. She was refloated with assistance from five smacks and resumed her voyage.
William and Richard	United Kingdom	The ship was driven ashore at "Sand-le-Mer". She was refloated on 11 December and taken in to Sunderland.
Yankee (pilot boat)	United States	The pilot boat sank off Sandy Hook, New Jersey with the loss of four lives.

== 4 December ==
List of shipwrecks: 4 December 1852
Ship	State	Description
Defence	United Kingdom	The ship was damaged by fire at Liverpool, Lancashire.
Eden	Norway	The ship sprang a leak and was beached at Skottehavnen. She was on a voyage from Raaby to Hull, Yorkshire, United Kingdom.
Hope	United Kingdom	The smack capsized in the Irish Sea 10 nautical miles (19 km) off Norbreck, Lancashire. Her crew were rescued.
Jessie Stephens	United Kingdom	The ship was abandoned in the Atlantic Ocean. Her crew were rescued by the steamship Pacific (United States). Jessie Stephens was on a voyage from Quebec City, Province of Canada, British North America to Belfast, County Antrim and/or Glasgow, Renfrewshire. She was still afloat on 24 March 1853.
Victoria	United Kingdom	The brig sprang a leak and sank in the North Sea 25 nautical miles (46 km) north by east of the mouth of the Humber. Her crew were rescued by the schooner Trial (United Kingdom).

== 5 December ==
List of shipwrecks: 5 December 1852
Ship	State	Description
Star	(United Kingdom of Great Britain and Ireland) Guernsey	The ship was driven ashore and wrecked at Hurst Castle, Hampshire.

== 6 December ==
List of shipwrecks: 6 December 1852
Ship	State	Description
Hendrika	Netherlands	The ship was wrecked near Katwijk aan Zee, South Holland. Her crew were rescued. She was on a voyage from Amsterdam, North Holland to Nantes, Loire-Inférieure.
Ovando	France	The ship was destroyed by fire at Nassau, Bahamas. She was on a voyage from Havre de Grâce, Seine-Inférieure to New York, United States.
Pretty Maggy	United Kingdom	The ship was wrecked on the Mixon Shoal, in the Bristol Channel with the loss of all six people on board. She was on a voyage from "Ballinacura" to Cardiff, Glamorgan.
Union	United Kingdom	The ship was drivean ashore and wrecked at "Cwmyrw", Anglesey. Her crew were rescued. She was on a voyage from Falmouth, Cornwall to Liverpool, Lancashire.

== 7 December ==
List of shipwrecks: 7 December 1852
Ship	State	Description
Doris	United Kingdom	The ship was sighted in the Øresund whilst on a voyage from Danzig to London. No further trace, presumed foundered with the loss of all hands.
Mary Ann	United Kingdom	The ship was driven ashore and wrecked at Prestatyn, Flintshire. Her crew were rescued. She was on a voyage from Liverpool, Lancashire to Amlwch, Anglesey.

== 8 December ==
List of shipwrecks: 8 December 1852
Ship	State	Description
Belinda	United Kingdom	The brig struck the pier and was damaged at Ramsgate, Kent. She was beached at Broadstairs. Her crew were rescued by HMRC Rose ( Board of Customs) and boats from Ramsgate. Belinda was taken in to Ramsgate in a sinking condition.
Daniel	Greifswald	The ship was driven ashore near "Alfskagen", Denmark. She was on a voyage from Sunderland, County Durham, United Kingdom to Greifswald.
Dart	United Kingdom	The ship was wrecked on Brier Island, Nova Scotia, British North America. She was on a voyage from Saint Lucia to Liverpool, Nova Scotia.
Duke of Northumberland	United Kingdom	The ship was driven ashore at New Romney, Kent. She was on a voyage from London to Port Phillip, South Australia. She was refloated and taken in to The Downs.
Eliza and Caroline	United Kingdom	The ship ran aground on the Head Sand, in the North Sea off the coast of County Durham. Her crew were rescued. She was on a voyage from Waterford to South Shields, County Durham. Eliza and Caroline was refloated on 10 December and taken in to South Shields.

== 9 December ==
List of shipwrecks: 9 December 1852
Ship	State	Description
Ann	United Kingdom	The ship ran aground on the North Gar Sand, off the mouth of the River Tees. She was on a voyage from Hartlepool, County Durham to Devonport, Devon. She was refloated and put back to Hartlepool.
Arion	Stralsund	The ship was driven ashore and wrecked at Getterön, Sweden. Her crew were rescued. She was on a voyage from Stralsund to Grangemouth, Stirlingshire, United Kingdom.
James Reddin	United Kingdom	The brig was reported to have been wrecked on the north coast of Prince Edward Island, British North America with the loss of all but one of her crew. She was on a voyage from Miramichi, New Brunswick British North America to Larne, County Antrim. She was towed in to Fleetwood, Lancashire on 29 December with only one mast standing. James Reddin was towed to Belfast, County Antrim by the steamship Fenella (United Kingdom) on 21 February 1953.
Margaret	United Kingdom	The ship was wrecked on the South Bank, off Dundee, Forfarshire. Her crew were rescued.
Marys	United Kingdom	The ship was driven ashore in Orlock Bay. She was refloated on 13 December and towed in to Belfast, County Antrim.
Orion	Stralsund	The ship was driven ashore near Getterön, Sweden and sank. Her crew were rescued. She was on a voyage from Stralsund to Grangemouth, Stirlingshire. United Kingdom.
Syra	United Kingdom	The ship ran aground on the Black Tail Sand, in the Thames Estuary off the coast of Essex. She was on a voyage from South Shields, County Durham to London. She was refloated on 11 December and taken in to Southend, Essex.
To Brodre	Norway	The ship struck a sunken rock and sank between Laurvig and Sandefjord. Her crew were rescued.
Trap	United Kingdom	The sloop ran aground and sank on the East Hoyle Sandbank, in Liverpool Bay. Her crew were rescued. She was on a voyage from Barrow in Furness, Lancashire to Chester, Cheshire. Trap was refloated on 15 December and beached.

== 10 December ==
List of shipwrecks: 10 December 1852
Ship	State	Description
Colonizador	Empire of Brazil	The brig was driven into Mary Rowe (United Kingdom) and sank at Buenos Aires, Argentina.
HMS Cyclops	Royal Navy	The paddle frigate ran aground on the Cant Ledge, off the Isle of Sheppey, Kent. She was refloated with the assistance of the tug Adder (United Kingdom) and taken in to Sheerness, Kent.
Elizabeth	Hamburg	The brig was driven ashore at Buenos Aires.
Gossypium	United Kingdom	The ship ran aground on the Flats. She was on a voyage from Moulmein, Burma to a British port.
Gramm	Denmark	The brig was severely damaged at Buenos Aires.
Norma	France	The barque was driven ashore at Buenos Aires.
Rover	United Kingdom	The paddle steamer was in collision with the paddle steamer Princess Alice (United Kingdom off Bangor Head, County Down and lost her bow. She was beached and sank near Dunseverick Castle, County Antrim. All on board were rescued. She was on a voyage from Londonderry to the Clyde.
Succours	Denmark	The brig was driven ashore and wrecked at Buenos Aires.

== 11 December ==
List of shipwrecks: 11 December 1852
Ship	State	Description
Adonis	(United Kingdom of Great Britain and Ireland) British North America	The ship was driven ashore at Liverpool, Nova Scotia. She was on a voyage from Prince Edward Island to New Brunswick.
Alert	United Kingdom	The ship was driven ashore near Maryport, Cumberland.
Allan	United Kingdom	The ship caught fire and was beached and scuttled near Kedgeree, India. She was on a voyage from Calcutta, India to Liverpool, Lancashire. She had been refloated by 19 January 1853.
Bouin	Duchy of Holstein	The ship ran aground and was wrecked on the Linenplate, at the mouth of the Eider. Her crew survived. She was on a voyage from Hartlepool, County Durham, United Kingdom to Rendsburg, Duchy of Schleswig.
Bullion	United Kingdom	The ship was driven ashore at Redcar, Yorkshire. She was on a voyage from Plymouth, Devon to Middlesbrough, Yorkshire. She was refloated and taken in to Middlesbrough.
Caroline	United Kingdom	The ship was holed by an anchor and sank in the River Tyne.
Countess of Durham	United Kingdom	The ship was driven on to the Herd Sand, in the North Sea off the coast of County Durham. The one person on board was rescued.
Edward Cohen	United States	The barque was driven on to the Herd Sand. She was refloated.
Francis	(United Kingdom of Great Britain and Ireland) British North America	The ship was driven ashore at Liverpool, Nova Scotia. She was on a voyage from Saint John's, Newfoundland to Cuba.
Jane and Elizabeth	United Kingdom	The ship ran aground, capsized and sank in the River Tyne with the loss of both people on board.
Jenny Lind	United Kingdom	The tug was discovered derelict in Liverpool Bay. She was towed in to Birkenhead, Cheshire by the tug Hercules (United Kingdom).
Joseph and Jane	United Kingdom	The ship ran aground on the Black Shore Bank, in the Irish Sea. She was on a voyage from Liverpool, Lancashire to Dumfries.
Junege Hendrik	Hamburg	The ship ran aground on the Linenplate. Her crew survived. She was on a voyage from Hamburg to the Eider.
Kingstown	United Kingdom	The ship was driven ashore at Conway, Caernarfonshire. She was on a voyage from Quebec City, Province of Canada, British North America to Conway.
Lenigkeit	Hamburg	The ship ran aground on the Linenplate. Her crew survived.
Magna	Duchy of Holstein	The ship ran aground and was wrecked on the Linenplate. Her crew survived. She was on a voyage from Hartlepool to Rendsburg.
Mary Ann	United Kingdom	The ship was driven ashore at Redcar. She was on a voyage from Harwich, Essex to Middlesbrough. She was refloated and taken in to Middlesbrough.
Nina	Hamburg	The ship ran aground and was wrecked on the Linenplate. Her crew survived.
Nord	Lübeck	The ship was driven ashore and wrecked at Siipyy, Grand Duchy of Finland before 20 December. She was on a voyage from Lübeck to Pori, Grand Duchy of Finland.
Princess Helene	United Kingdom	The ship was driven ashore at Dungeness, Kent. She was on a voyage from Callao, Peru to Antwerp, Belgium. She was refloated the next day and put in to Ramsgate, Kent in a leaky condition.
St. Joseph	France	The ship departed from Dinan, Côtes-du-Nord for Dunkirk, Nord. No further trace, presumed foundered with the loss of all hands.
Union	United Kingdom	The ship was driven ashore and wrecked at Peterhead, Aberdeenshire. Her crew were rescued. She was on a voyage from Sunderland, County Durham to Peterhead.

== 12 December ==
List of shipwrecks: 12 December 1852
Ship	State	Description
Annie	United Kingdom	The ship ran aground off Mauritius. She was on a voyage from Hobart, Van Diemen's Land to Mauritius. She was refloated and taken in to Mauritius.
Cecilia	Norway	The ship was in collision with a brig and was abandoned by all but one of her crew. The last man was taken off by Sophie (Bremen) on 14 December.
Comet	United Kingdom	The ship departed from London for Bristol, Gloucestershire. No further trace, presumed foundered with the loss of all hands.
John Leech	United Kingdom	The ship was wrecked at the Sand Heads, India. All on board were rescued. She was on a voyage from Liverpool, Lancashire to Calcutta, India.
Marie Elizabeth	France	The brig was in collision with the brig Triton (Greece) and was reported to have sunk off Cádiz, Spain with the loss of all but her captain. She was on a voyage from Adra, Spain to Dunkirk, Nord. Also reported as having put in to Huelva, Spain in a severely damaged condition on 14 December.
Ninus	(United Kingdom of Great Britain and Ireland) Jersey	The schooner was driven onto the Herd Sand, in the North Sea off the coast of County Durham. Her crew were rescued. She had been refloated by 16 December and taken in to South Shields, County Durham for repairs.
Victoria Adelaide	United Kingdom	The ship departed from London for Dunkirk. No further trace, presumed foundered with the loss of all hands.
Xerxes	United States	The ship was abandoned in the Atlantic Ocean off the coast of Maine. Her crew were rescued. She was on a voyage from Boston, Massachusetts to the Maitland River.

== 13 December ==
List of shipwrecks: 13 December 1852
Ship	State	Description
Caroline	United Kingdom	The ship was driven ashore near South Shields, County Durham.
Rosetta	United Kingdom	The ship was driven ashore near South Shields.
St. Yves	France	The lugger sank in the English Channel. Her crew were rescued by the brig Selma (Sweden).
William and Mary	United Kingdom	The paddle tug sank at South Shields.

== 14 December ==
List of shipwrecks: 14 December 1852
Ship	State	Description
Adelaide	(United Kingdom of Great Britain and Ireland) Jersey	The ship ran aground on the Newcombe Sand, in the North Sea off the coast of Suffolk. She was on a voyage from Guernsey, Channel Islands to Newcastle upon Tyne, Northumberland. She was refloated and taken in to Lowestoft, Suffolk in a leaky condition.
Cynthia	United Kingdom	The ship ran aground on the South Bull, in the Irish Sea off the coast of County Dublin. She was on a voyage from Ardrossan, Ayrshire to Dublin. Cynthia was refloated on 16 December and towed in to Dublin.
Earl of Seafield	United Kingdom	The sloop ran aground on Scroby Sands, Norfolk. She was refloated with assistance and resumed her voyage.
Triton	Netherlands	The ship sprang a leak and was abandoned off Texel, North Holland. Her crew were rescued. She was on a voyage from Antwerp, Belgium to the Nieuw Diep.
Western World	United States	The steamboat was in collision with the steamboat H. W. R. Hill (United States) and capsized in the Mississippi River upstream of Princeton, Mississippi with the loss of twelve lives.

== 15 December ==
List of shipwrecks: 15 December 1852
Ship	State	Description
Arrow	United Kingdom	The ship was wrecked on the Horse Sand, in the Solent. Her crew were rescued. She was on a voyage from Sunderland, County Durham to St. Helen's, Isle of Wight.
John Leach	United Kingdom	The ship was wrecked at the South Heads, India. Her crew were rescued. She was on a voyage from Liverpool, Lancashire to Calcutta, India.
Mary	Flag unknown	The ship was lost off "Hangdaike" with the loss of all hands. She was on a voyage from Saint Petersburg, Russia to "Christinestad".
Mary Turcan	United Kingdom	The full-rigged ship was abandoned in the Atlantic Ocean off Knotts Island, North Carolina, United States. Her crew were rescued. She was on a voyage from Alexandria, Virginia, United States to Liverpool, Lancashire.
Wooperton	United Kingdom	The brig was in collision with the brig Robert and Margaret (United Kingdom) and sank 9 nautical miles (17 km) off the coast of Yorkshire. Her crew were rescued by Robert and Margaret.

== 16 December ==
List of shipwrecks: 16 December 1852
Ship	State	Description
Aid	United Kingdom	The ship ran aground on the Dutchman's Bank, in the Irish Sea. She was consequently beached near Youghal, County Cork.
Asia	United Kingdom	The ship was driven ashore and wrecked at Brest, Finistère, France with the loss of three of her crew. She was on a voyage from Liverpool, Lancashire to Mobile, Alabama, United States.
Clarissa	United Kingdom	The barque was wrecked on the Newcombe Sand, in the North Sea off the coast of Suffolk. All fourteen people on board survived. She was on a voyage from Danzig to London. Clarissa was refloated the next day and towed in to Lowestoft, Suffolk.
Mary Florence	United States	The barque was wrecked on the Newcombe Sand. All seventeen people on board were rescued by a yawl and the Lowestoft Lifeboat. She was on a voyage from Newcastle upon Tyne, Northumberland, United Kingdom to Philadelphia, Pennsylvania.
Mersey	United Kingdom	The ship was damaged by fire at Torbay, Devon.
Nouvelle Loire	France	The barque was driven ashore at Portland, Dorset, United Kingdom with the loss of seven of her crew. She was on a voyage from Havre de Grâce, Seine-Inférieure to Africa.
Penelope	United Kingdom	The schooner ran aground and was wrecked on the Herd Sand, in the North Sea off the coast of County Durham. Her crew were rescued. She was on a voyage from London to South Shields, County Durham.
Sir Fowell Buxton	United Kingdom	Sir Fowel Buxton. The barque was wrecked on the Tapioca Shoals, in the Atlantic Ocean off the coast of Brazil with the loss of 3 of the 230 people on board. She was on a voyage from London to Port Phillip, Victoria.
Supreme Sagesse	France	The collier was lost off Bideford, Devon. with the loss of six of her eight crew. She was on a voyage from Newport, Monmouthshire, United Kingdom to Sierra Leone.
Windsor Fay	United States	The ship ran aground on the Romer Shoals and became hogged. She was on a voyage from Livorno, Grand Duchy of Tuscany to New York.

== 17 December ==
List of shipwrecks: 17 December 1852
Ship	State	Description
Alida	United Kingdom	The schooner ran aground on the Scroby Sands, Norfolk. She was refloated the next day and taken in to Lowestoft, Suffolk in a waterlogged condition.
Catharina	Hamburg	The ship was in collision with another vessel and was beached at Cowes, Isle of Wight, United Kingdom. She was on a voyage from Hamburg to Buenos Aires, Argentina. She was refloated on 21 December and taken in to Cowes in a leaky condition.
Cumberland	United Kingdom	The brig was driven ashore on Bornholm, Denmark.
Friedrick Moldenham	Prussia	The ship was driven ashore at Schwarzort. She was consequently condemned.
Giffords	United Kingdom	The schooner was driven ashore on Bornholm.
Harriet	United Kingdom	The ship was driven ashore and severely damaged at the Mumbles, Glamorgan. She was on a voyage from Swansea, Glamorgan to Madeira.
Liberty	United Kingdom	The ship was driven ashore in Deadman's Bay, Devon. She was refloated on 19 December.
Llewellyn	United Kingdom	The ship was driven ashore at the Mumbles. She was on a voyage from Swansea to the Cape Verde Islands.
Loyal Briton	United Kingdom	The ship was driven ashore on Bornholm with the loss of all hands. Also reported to be a brig wrecked on the Sandhammer Reef, in the Baltic Sea with the loss of all but one of her crew. She was on a voyage from Danzig to London.
Phoenix	United Kingdom	The steamship was driven ashore at Barnstaple, Devon.
Rambler	United Kingdom	The ship was driven ashore in Beadman's Bay, Devon.
Royal Britain	United Kingdom	The brig was wrecked on the Sandhammer Reef, in the Baltic Sea with the loss of all but one of her crew. She was on a voyage from Danzig to London.
Weatherall	United Kingdom	The ship was driven ashore at Coatham, Yorkshire. She was on a voyage from London to Seaham, County Durham. Weatherall was refloated on 26 December and taken in to Hartlepool, County Durham.

== 18 December ==
List of shipwrecks: 18 December 1852
Ship	State	Description
Eclipse	United Kingdom	The sloop was driven ashore on the Foreness Rock, Margate, Kent.
Falcon	United Kingdom	The sailing barge was driven ashore at Dungeness, Kent. All four people on board were rescued. She was on a voyage from London to Rye, Sussex.
Fides	Hamburg	The ship ran aground off Ameland, Friesland, Netherlands. Her crew were rescued. She was on a voyage from Hamburg to Pernambuco, Brazil.
Friedrich	Prussia	The ship was driven ashore at "Schwarzol". She was on a voyage from Stettin to Memel.
Garonne	United Kingdom	The ship was driven ashore on Caldy Island, Pembrokeshire. She was on a voyage from Cardiff, Glamorgan to Plymouth, Devon. She was refloated and taken in to Tenby, Pembrokeshire.
'='	United Kingdom	The ship was abandoned in the Atlantic Ocean. Her crew were rescued by Florida (United Kingdom)). Isabella was on a voyage from Saint John, New Brunswick, British North America to Hull, Yorkshire.
Isabella Harris	United Kingdom	The ship was wrecked in Barlogue Bay, County Cork with the loss of a crew member. She was on a voyage from Port Wallace, Nova Scotia, British North America to Hull.
Jane Sibbald	United Kingdom	The ship was driven ashore at Ambleteuse, Pas-de-Calais, France. Her crew were rescued. She was on a voyage from Galway to London.
Maria	United Kingdom	The sloop was driven ashore at Whitehaven, Cumberland. Her crew were rescued. Her crew were rescued. She was on a voyage from Whitehaven to Cardiff, Glamorgan.
Maria Thèrèse	France	The ship was driven ashore at Sines, Portugal. Her crew were rescued. She was on a voyage from Senegal to Marseille, Bouches-du-Rhône.
Minerva	United Kingdom	The ship ran aground on the Foreness Rock. She was refloated on 21 December and taken in to Margate.
Seppings	United Kingdom	The ship was abandoned in the Atlantic Ocean. Her crew were rescued by Carlo (Flag unknown). Seppings was on a voyage from Quebec City, Province of Canada, British North America to Bridgwater, Somerset.
Thomas	United Kingdom	The ship was abandoned in the North Sea off Flamborough Head, Yorkshire. Her crew were rescued. She was on a voyage from Sunderland, County Durham to Caen, Calvados, France.
William	United Kingdom	The ship was driven ashore at Greencastle, County Donegal. She was on a voyage from Belfast, County Antrim to Malin Head, County Donegal. She was refloated on 20 December and beached at Moville, County Donega.

== 19 December ==
List of shipwrecks: 19 December 1852
Ship	State	Description
Agnes	United Kingdom	The ship was driven ashore at Beach Point, Essex. She was refloated and taken in to Harwich, Essex in a leaky condition.
Ann and Mary	United Kingdom	The brig struck the Sizewell Bank, in the North Sea off the coast of Suffolk and foundered with the loss of one of her eight crew. Sufvivors were rescued by the schooner True Blue (United Kingdom). Ann and Mary was on a voyage from Seaham, County Durham to London.
Arendina	Flag unknown	The ship sailed for London on this date. No further trace, presumed foundered with the loss of all hands.
Bywell	United Kingdom	The brig was in collision with another vessel and foundered in the North Sea. Her crew were rescued. She was on a voyage from South Shields, County Durham to London.
Chio	France	The ship was driven ashore at Cape St. Sebastian. Her crew were rescued. She was on a voyage from Monastagem, Morocco to Marseille, Bouches-du-Rhône.
Cicely	United Kingdom	The brig ran aground on the Scroby Sands, Norfolk. She was on a voyage from Sunderland, County Durham to Southampton, Hampshire.
Constantine	Ottoman Empire	The ship was wrecked at "Achialow". She was on a voyage from Varna to a British port.
Crocus	United Kingdom	The ship was driven ashore at Sunderland, County Durham. She was refloated on 26 December and towed in to Sunderland.
Eaglet	United Kingdom	The ship was driven ashore at Ramsgate, Kent. She was on a voyage from London to Penzance, Cornwall. She was refloated on 22 December.
Horn	United Kingdom	The ship was driven ashore north of Girvan, Ayrshire. She was on a voyage from Belfast, County Antrim to Troon, Ayrshire.
Hutton	United Kingdom	The schooner foundered in the North Sea off Dimlington, Yorkshire. She was on a voyage from Sunderland to London.
Icio Mana	(United Kingdom of Great Britain and Ireland) New Zealand	The schooner ran aground at Auckland. She was refloated.
Metoka	United States	The ship was driven ashore and wrecked at New Romney, Kent. She was on a voyage from London to New Orleans, Louisiana.
Neptunus	United Kingdom	The ship was in collision with Jane Montgomery (United Kingdom) and sank in the Irish Sea off Point Lynas, Anglesey. Her crew were rescued by Jonathan Montgomery (United Kingdom). Neptunus was on a voyage from Venice, Kingdom of Lombardy–Venetia to Liverpool, Lancashire. She was refloated on 3 February 1853 and beached.
Pauline	Stettin	The ship ran aground on Scroby Sands. She was on a voyage from Stettin to London. She was refloated and taken in to Lowestoft in a waterlogged condition.
Royal Oak	United Kingdom	The ship ran aground on the Aldeburgh Neaps, in the North Sea off the coast of Suffolk. She was on a voyage from Hartlepool, County Durham to London. She was refloated and taken in to Lowestoft in a waterlogged condition and was beached there.
Seaman	United Kingdom	The ship was driven ashore at Holyhead, Anglesey. Her crew were rescued. She was on a voyage from Ardrossan, Ayrshire to Cardiff, Glamorgan. She was refloated on 13 February 1853.
Sylvanus	United Kingdom	The ship was driven ashore and wrecked on Uyea, Shetland Islands. Her crew were rescued. She was on a voyage from Londonderry to South Shields.
Thomas and Margaret	United Kingdom	The ship was wrecked at Sunderland. Her crew were rescued.
Union	(United Kingdom of Great Britain and Ireland) Guernsey	The ship was in collision with Blenheim (United Kingdom) and was abandoned in the North Sea off Flamborough Head, Yorkshire. Her crew were rescued by Blenheim.
Vittoria	Flag unknown	The ship was driven ashore and damaged near Pont-l'Abbé, Finistère, France. She was on a voyage from Terra Nova to Gloucester, United Kingdom. She was refloated and taken in to Pont-l'Abbé.

== 20 December ==
List of shipwrecks: 20 December 1852
Ship	State	Description
Anna Erika	Norway	The ship was driven ashore and wrecked at "Lyngsaa", Denmark. Her crew were rescued. She was on a voyage from Frederikshald to Middelfahrt, Denmark.
Athena	United Kingdom	The ship was wrecked at Maltreath, Anglesey. Her crew were rescued by a lifeboat. She was on a voyage from Alexandria, Egypt to Liverpool, Lancashire.
Catharina	Hamburg	The ship was in collision with Finland ( (Russian Empire) Grand Duchy of Finland) and was beached at Cowes, Isle of Wight, United Kingdom. She was on a voyage from Hamburg to Buenos Aires, Argentina. She was refloated.
Ettiena	Netherlands	The ship was driven ashore and wrecked 50 nautical miles (93 km) south of Bergen, Norway. She was on a voyage from Bergen to Stavanger, Norway.
Evangelist	Greece	The brig was driven ashore at Dingle, County Kerry, United Kingdom.
Janet Halley	United Kingdom	The schooner departed from the Flekkefjord for Perth. No further trace, presumed foundered with the loss of all hands.
Newton	United Kingdom	The ship was abandoned off Læsø, Denmark. Her crew were rescued. She was subsequently towed in to Fredrikshavn, Denmark.
Planter	United Kingdom	The brig ran aground on the Stony Binks off the mouth of the Humber. She was on a voyage from Sunderland, County Durham to Portsmouth, Hampshire. She was refloated and put in to Grimsby, Lincolnshire.
Provincialist	United Kingdom	The full-rigged ship foundered in the Atalantic Ocean (36°36′N 51°31′W). Her crew were rescued by the barque Union Compostelana (Spain). Provincialist was on a voyage from Philadelphia, Pennsylvania, United States to Liverpool.
Scot	United Kingdom	The ship was driven ashore and wrecked at Allonby, Cumberland. Her crew were rescued.
Test	United Kingdom	The ship was driven ashore near Allonby, Cumberland. She was on a voyage from Carlisle, Cumberland to Cardiff, Glamorgan or Newport, Monmouthshire. She was refloated on 23 December.
Young Queen	(United Kingdom of Great Britain and Ireland) New South Wales	The ship struck a reef and was beached on Nobbys Island with the loss of four of her crew.

== 21 December ==
List of shipwrecks: December 1852
Ship	State	Description
Athena	United Kingdom	The ship was driven ashore and wrecked at Caernarfon. She was on a voyage from Alexandria, Egypt to Liverpool, Lancashire.
Hannah	Lübeck	The ship was driven ashore and wrecked at Helsingfors, Sweden. She was on a voyage from Lübeck to Porvoo, Grand Duchy of Finland.
John and Elizabeth	United Kingdom	The ship was driven ashore and sank at Wells-next-the-Sea, Norfolk. She was refloated on 31 December and found to be severely damaged.
Minerva	Denmark	The ship was abandoned in the North Sea 20 nautical miles (37 km) west of Texel, North Holland, Netherlands. Her crew were rescued.
Northern Maid	United Kingdom	The sloop was driven ashore 6 nautical miles (11 km) east of Dunbar, Lothian. She was on a voyage from "Carlinsnose" to Warkworth, Northumberland.
Sir Howard Douglas	United Kingdom	The ship was driven ashore and wrecked in Glenluce Bay. Her crew were rescued. She was on a voyage from Liverpool to Apalachicola, Florida, United States. She broke up on 27 December.
William Thorp	United Kingdom	The sloop struck the Swadman Rock and sank in the North Sea off the Farne Islands, Northumberland. Her crew were rescued.

== 22 December ==
List of shipwrecks: 22 December 1852
Ship	State	Description
Asia	United Kingdom	The ship was driven ashore at Tarbert, Argyllshire.
Bans Vale	United Kingdom	The ship was driven ashore on Piel Island, Lancashire.
Corinthian	United Kingdom	The brig was driven ashore and wrecked at Thorpeness, Suffolk with the loss of all hands.
De Jogger	Netherlands	The ship was driven ashore and wrecked at Orfordness, Suffolk with some loss of life.
Earl of Fife	United Kingdom	The ship was driven ashore at Landguard Fort, Harwich, Essex. She was on a voyage from Sunderland, County Durham to Harwich. She was refloated and taken in a leaky condition.
Eliza	United Kingdom	The ship was driven ashore and wrecked on Scattery Island, County Clare. She was on a voyage from Sligo to London.
Emilie	Prussia	The ship was driven ashore near "Pasewark". Her crew were rescued. She was on a voyage from Stettin to Königsberg.
Flowers of Ugie	United Kingdom	The ship was wrecked on the Deans Sandbank, in the English Channel off the coast of Hampshire. Her crew were rescued by a pilot boat. She was on a voyage from Sunderland, County Durham to Cartagena, Spain.
Halcyon	(United Kingdom of Great Britain and Ireland) Guernsey	The ship ran aground on the Herd Sand, in the North Sea off the coast of County Durham. Her crew were rescued.
Lowther	United Kingdom	The schooner was driven ashore on Bird Island, in the Strangford Lough. Her crew were rescued. She was on a voyage from Glasgow, Renfrewshire to Rouen, Seine-Inférieure, France. She broke up on 27 December.
Marchioness of Bute	United Kingdom	The ship was driven ashore and wrecked at Swanborough, North Carolina, United States. She was on a voyage from Quebec City, Province of Canada, British North America to Belfast, County Antrim.
Nueva Carmen	Spain	The ship was driven ashore in Dundrum Bay. She was on a voyage from Havana, Cuba to Hamburg. She was refloated on 11 January 1853 and towed in to Belfast, County Antrim, United Kingdom.
Ocean Queen	United Kingdom	The steamship was wrecked off The Mewstone, Devon with the loss of all fifteen people on board. She was on a voyage from London to Jamaica.
Omega	United Kingdom	The schooner was driven ashore south of Bridlington, Yorkshire with the loss of all hands.
Providence	United Kingdom	The flat was driven ashore on Piel Island.
Sprightly	United Kingdom	The flat was driven ashore on Piel Island.
Swanen	Norway	The ship was driven ashore on Skagen, Denmark. Her crew were rescued. She was on a voyage from Honfleur, Calvados, France to Helsingør, Denmark.
Tay	United Kingdom	The ship was driven ashore on Governors Island, New York. She was on a voyage from New York to the Clyde.
Thetis	United Kingdom	The schooner sank off Cardigan. She was on a voyage from Swansea, Glamorgan to Cardigan.
Turner	United Kingdom	The flat was driven ashore on Piel Island.

== 23 December ==
List of shipwrecks: 23 December 1852
Ship	State	Description
Agnes	United Kingdom	The ship ran aground at Birkenhead, Cheshire. She was on a voyage from Birkenhead to British Honduras.
Brightlingsea	United Kingdom	The ship departed from St. Andrews, Fife for London. No further trace, presumed foundered with the loss of all hands.
Chelydra	United Kingdom	The ship was severely damaged by fire at Swansea, Glamorgan.
Fritheof	Sweden	The ship ran aground at Berwick upon Tweed, Northumberland, United Kingdom. She was on a voyage from Callao, Peru to Stockholm.
Jessie and Alexander	(United Kingdom of Great Britain and Ireland) Isle of Man	The ship was driven ashore and wrecked at Fraserburgh, Aberdeenshire. Her crew were rescued.
John	United Kingdom	The ship was driven ashore and wrecked at Littlehampton, Sussex. Her crew were rescued. She was on a voyage from Hartlepool, County Durham to Littlehampton.
Kingston	United Kingdom	The ship was wrecked on Robben Island, Cape Colony with the loss of five of her crew. She was on a voyage from Baltimore, Maryland, United States to Cape Town, Cape Colony.
Margaret Scott	United Kingdom	The ship departed from Korsør, Denmark for Leith, Lothian. No further trace, presumed foundered with the loss of all hands.
Messenger	United Kingdom	The ship ran aground on the Mapoon Sand, off the coast of Burma. She was on a voyage from Moulmein, Burma to a British port. She was refloated on 25 December and resumed her voyage.
Morning Star	(United Kingdom of Great Britain and Ireland) British North America	The ship was driven ashore at Louisbourg, Nova Scotia.
Richmond	United States	The ship was abandoned in the Atlantic Ocean. Her crew were rescued. She was on a voyage from Lanzarote, Canary Islands to New York.
San Gines	Spain	The brig was lost on the Flemish Banks, in the North Sea off the coast of West Flanders, Belgium with the loss of five of her eleven crew. She was on a voyage from Hamburg to Liverpool, Lancashire, United Kingdom.
Stockton	United Kingdom	The brig was driven ashore on the Hel Peninsula, Prussia. Her crew were rescued. She was on a voyage from London to Danzig. She was refloated on 30 April 1853.
Wilhelmina	Stettin	The ship was driven ashore near "Traisendorf". Her crew were rescued. She was on a voyage from Stettin to Griefswald.

== 24 December ==
List of shipwrecks: 24 December 1852
Ship	State	Description
Albert	Sweden	The ship was driven ashore at "Freigendahl", Norway. Her crew were rescued. She was on a voyage from "Weile" to an English port.
Baltic	United Kingdom	The barque was driven ashore on Fox Island, New Brunswick, British North America with the loss of a crew member. She was consequently condemned.
Dolphin	United Kingdom	The ship was driven ashore at Great Yarmouth, Norfolk. Her crew were rescued. She was on a voyage from Liverpool, Lancashire to Great Yarmouth. She was refloated on 27 December and taken in to port. Also reported as Barmouth, Caernarfonshire.
Donau	Flag unknown	The ship sailed for London, United Kingdom on this date. No further trace, presumed foundered with the loss of all hands.
Ebenezer	United Kingdom	The schooner departed from Middlesbrough, Yorkshire for Hull, Yorkshire. No further trace, presumed foundered with the loss of all hands.
Eleanor	United Kingdom	The ship was driven ashore and wrecked near Kirkcaldy, Fife. Her crew were rescued.
Queen of Britain	United Kingdom	The ship ran aground at Berbice, British Honduras.
Rival	United Kingdom	The ship was wrecked at Pachino, Sicily. She was on a voyage from Odesa to a British port.
St. George	United States	The ship caught fire in the Atlantic Ocean (40°12′N 23°30′W). Her 25 crew and 76 of her 121 passengers were rescued by Orlando (United States). St. George was on a voyage from Liverpool to New York.
William	United Kingdom	The ship was driven ashore at Pirate Cove. She was on a voyage from Prince Edward Island, British North America to Boston, Massachusetts, United States. She was consequently condemned.
Wind	Netherlands	The ship was destroyed by fire at Batavia, Netherlands East Indies.
Zante	United Kingdom	The ship ran aground on Arthurstowe Bank, in the Irish Sea. She was refloated the next day and taken in to Waterford.

== 25 December ==
List of shipwrecks: 25 December 1852
Ship	State	Description
Active	United Kingdom	The ship was driven out to sea crewless from South Shields, County Durham. She was subsequently taken in to South Shields by Black Eagle (United Kingdom).
Arnal, and Brockett	United Kingdom	Arnal was in collision with Brockett at the entrance to the Bosphorus and was beached at "Kavak", Ottoman Empire. She was on a voyage from Odesa to a British port Brockett put in to Büyükdere in a severely damaged condition. She was on a voyage from Odesa to Falmouth, Cornwall or Queenstown, County Cork.
Carolina	United Kingdom	The brig was driven ashore and wrecked at Southport, Lancashire. Her crew were rescued by the Southport Lifeboat. She was on a voyage from Havana, Cuba to Liverpool, Lancashire.
Catherine	United Kingdom	The sloop was wrecked on the Trinity Sand, in the North Sea off the coast of Lincolnshire. She was on a voyage from Glasgow, Renfrewshire to London.
Dove	United Kingdom	The ship was driven ashore and severely damaged at Milford Haven, Pembrokeshire. She was on a voyage from Newport, Monmouthshire to Cork. She was refloated.
Eliza	United Kingdom	The ship was driven ashore and wrecked at Kilrush, County Clare.
Flora	United Kingdom	The ship was last heard from on this day, presumed subsequently foundered, probably on 27 December.
Frances	USA	This American whaler, under Captain William Swain, was wrecked on the reef of Mangaia on the night of 25 December when she drifted on in a calm, there being no bottom outside the reef for anchors to hold. There was no loss of life. The Captain had high praise for the help of 22 native canoes that helped unload crew and provisions.
Friends	United Kingdom	The ship departed from the Humber for London. No further trace, presumed foundered in the North Sea with the loss of all hands.
Harmony	United Kingdom	The ship was driven ashore and severely damaged at Tynemouth, Northumberland. She was later refloated.
Harriett	United Kingdom	The ship was driven ashore on the Spanish Battery Rocks, on the coast of County Durham.
Henriette	Kingdom of Hanover	The ship was driven ashore near Cromer, Norfolk, United Kingdom. She was on a voyage from Emden to Ipswich, Suffolk, United Kingdom. She was refloated the next day and taken in to Great Yarmouth, Norfolk.
John and Margaret	United Kingdom	The ship foundered in the North Sea. Her crew were rescued.
Lowther	United Kingdom	The ship was driven ashore and wrecked at Bird Island, County Down.
Luna	United Kingdom	The ship foundered in the North Sea off Whitby, Yorkshire. Her eight crew were rescued by the brig Swift (United Kingdom).
Margaret	United Kingdom	The steamship was driven onto the Spanish Battery Rocks and was severely damaged. She was later refloated.
Margaret Harriet	United Kingdom	The ship departed from Newcastle upon Tyne, Northumberland for Poole, Dorset. No further trace, presumed foundered with the loss of all hands.
Marie Elise	Norway	The ship was driven ashore at Harboøre, Denmark. Her crew were rescued. She was on a voyage from Newcastle upon Tyne to Struer, Denmark.
Mary Agnes	United Kingdom	The ship was abandoned in the North Sea. Her crew were rescued by the tug Pilot (United Kingdom). Mary Agnes was on a voyage from the River Tyne to London.
Montpelier	United Kingdom	The schooner was fallen in with in the Atlantic Ocean in a wrecked condition. Two crew were taken off by RMS America (United Kingdom), but one died shortly afterwards. Montpelier was on a voyage from Salcombe, Devon to Liverpool.
Morleys	United Kingdom	The paddle steamer sank in the River Tyne at Stanhope, County Durham. She was later refloated.
Mountaineer	United Kingdom	The steamship was wrecked 8 nautical miles (15 km) north of the Currituck Inlet. Her crew were rescued. She was on a voyage from Liverpool to New York, United States.
Popplewell	United Kingdom	The ship was driven into the schooner Catherine and severely damaged at Milford Haven. She was on a voyage from Pembrey, Pembrokeshire to Dundalk, County Louth.
Reine de Anges	Spain	The ship was wrecked east of Boulogne, Pas-de-Calais, France.
Richard	United Kingdom	The schooner ran aground and capsized in the Duddon Estuary with the loss of four of her crew. She was on a voyage from Dundalk, County Louth to Preston, Lancashire.
Tiny Lass	United Kingdom	The smack was beached on Ynys Llanddwyn, Anglesey. She was on a voyage from Newport, Monmouthshire to Liverpool.

== 26 December ==
List of shipwrecks: 26 December 1852
Ship	State	Description
Aid	United Kingdom	The ship was driven ashore and severely damaged at Tarbert, County Kerry. She had been refloated by 1 January 1853 and taken in to Tarbert.
Aghios Nicholas	Greece	The ship was driven ashore in the River Shannon.
Annegina	Netherlands	The ship was driven ashore at Scheveningen, South Holland. Her crew were rescued. She was on a voyage from Amsterdam, North Holland to London, United Kingdom.
Anfion	Austrian Empire	The ship capsized at Askeaton, County Limerick, United Kingdom.
Argyll	United Kingdom	The schooner was run into by the schooner Favourite and sank at Kingstown, County Dublin. Her crew were rescued. She was on a voyage from Glasgow, Renfrewshire to Cork and/or Waterford.
Brothers	United Kingdom	The schooner was wrecked at Millbay, Plymouth, Devon.
Caroline	United Kingdom	The schooner was driven ashore at Abererch, Caernarfonshire with the loss of a crew member.
Carriboo	United Kingdom	The ship was wrecked at Whitehaven, Cumberland. Her crew were rescued.
Denison	United Kingdom	The full-rigged ship was driven ashore at Fleetwood, Lancashire. Two of her crew were reported missing. She was on a voyage from Liverpool, Lancashire to Antigua.
Egberdina Elizabeth	Flag unknown	The barque was driven on to the North Bank, in Liverpool Bay. She was refloated and taken in to the River Mersey.
Elizabeth	United Kingdom	The ship was driven ashore at Newport, Monmouthshire. She was on a voyage from Bristol, Gloucestershire to Melbourne, Victoria. She was refloated on 9 January 1853.
Elizabeth and Sarah	United Kingdom	The ship was driven ashore at Portsmouth, Hampshire. She was on a voyage from Sunderland, County Durham to Portsmouth. She was refloated and taken in to Portsmouth in a leaky condition.
Eu	United Kingdom	The ship was driven onto the Brake Sand, off the coast of Kent. She floated off and was abandoned. Eu was on a voyage from Liverpool, Lancashire to Antwerp, Belgium. She was subsequently towed in to Margate, Kent and beached.
Falcon	Norway	The ship was driven ashore on Grass Island, in the River Shannon.
Friends	United Kingdom	The smack was driven ashore at Abererch. Her crew were rescued. She was on a voyage from Liverpool to Swansea, Glamorgan.
Glenaeron	United Kingdom	The schooner was driven ashore at Abersoch, Caernarfonshire. Her crew were rescued.
Henriette	United Kingdom	The ship was driven ashore at Cromer, Norfolk. She was on a voyage from Emden, Kingdom of Hanover to Ipswich, Suffolk. She was refloated.
Heroine	United Kingdom	The barque was driven ashore and wrecked at Lyme Regis, Dorset with loss four would-be rescuers. She was on a voyage from London to Port Phillip, South Australia.
Hope	United Kingdom	The ship was abandoned in the North Sea. Her crew were rescued.
Industry	United Kingdom	The ship foundered in the North Sea 35 nautical miles (65 km) off Tynemouth, Northumberland. Her crew were rescued by Argus (United Kingdom). Industry was on a voyage from Sunderland to Southampton, Hampshire.
Jane	United Kingdom	The ship was wrecked at Whitehaven. Her crew were rescued.
John	United Kingdom	The ship was driven ashore at Redcar, Yorkshire. She was on a voyage from Charlton, Kent to Middlesbrough, Yorkshire.
Lady of the West	United Kingdom	The ship was abandoned in the Atlantic Ocean. Her crew took to a longboat and a pinnace. Fifteen crew in the longboat were rescued by Fanny (United Kingdom). Four crew were rescued by Napoleon (France) Lady of the West was on a voyage from Bristol, Gloucestershire to New Orleans, Louisiana, United States.
Laurel	United Kingdom	The ship was driven ashore at South Shields, County Durham. She was on a voyage from Sunderland, County Durham to South Shields. She was refloated on 4 January 1853 and taken in to South Shields.
Maria	United Kingdom	The ship ran aground on the Foreness Rock, Margate. She was on a voyage from Dunkirk, Nord, France to London.
Marigo	Greece	The ship was driven ashore on Grass Island, in the River Shannon.
Mary Ann	United Kingdom	The ship was abandoned in the North Sea 25 nautical miles (46 km) east by south of Flamborough Head, Yorkshire. Her eight crew were rescued by a schooner.
Northern Maid	United Kingdom	The schooner ran aground Trinity Sand, in the North Sea and was abandoned by her crew. She was on a voyage from Peterhead, Aberdeenshire to Great Yarmouth, Norfolk. She was taken in to Grimsby, Lincolnshire.
Olivia	United Kingdom	The schooner was driven ashore at Abererch. Her crew were rescued.
Pandora	United Kingdom	The barque was destroyed by fire at New Orleans, Louisiana, United States.
Pioneer	United Kingdom	The ship foundered in the North Sea off Great Yarmouthwith the loss of four of her crew. Survivors were rescued by the Great Yarmouth Lifeboat. She was on a voyage from London to the River Tyne, or South Shields, County Durham to London.
Sadak	United Kingdom	The ship was wrecked on the Brake Sand. Her crew were rescued. She was on a voyage from Smyrna, Ottoman Empire to London. The wreck was refloated on 2 February 1853 and beached at Dumpton Gap, Kent.
Spring	United Kingdom	The ship was abandoned in the North Sea with the loss of a crew member.
Vanguard	(United Kingdom of Great Britain and Ireland) British North America	The ship sprang a leak and was abandoned in the Atlantic Ocean. Her crew were rescued by Lady Sale (United Kingdom). Vanguard was on a voyage from Saint John, New Brunswick to Liverpool.
Wakefield	United Kingdom	The ship ran aground on the Goodwin Sands, Kent. She was on a voyage from Sunderland to Harfleur, Seine-Inférieure, France. She was refloated and taken in to Ramsgate, Kent in a leaky condition.
West Hendon	United Kingdom	The brig was driven ashore at Great Yarmouth. She was refloated the next day.
Wheathill	United Kingdom	The ship was abandoned in the North Sea. Her crew were rescued. She was on a voyage from Grangemouth, Stirlingshire to Hartlepool, County Durham.
Wool Packet	United Kingdom	The smack was driven ashore and wrecked on Sunk Island, Yorkshire. Her crew were rescued. She was on a voyage from Hartlepool, County Durham to Rochester, Kent. She was refloated on 31 January 1853 and towed in to Grimsby by the tug Rendel (United Kingdom).

== 27 December ==
List of shipwrecks: 27 December 1852
Ship	State	Description
Acorn	United Kingdom	The schooner was driven ashore at Dunbar, Lothian. She was on a voyage from Charlestown, Cornwall to Hartlepool, County Durham. She was refloated the next day and taken in to Dunbar.
Active, and Agnes	United Kingdom	The brigs collided in the North Sea off Caister-on-Sea, Norfolk. Active subsequently drove ashore. Agnes sank. Her crew were rescued.
Adele	(United Kingdom of Great Britain and Ireland) Jersey	The ship was driven ashore and wrecked at Lyme Regis, Dorset. Her crew were rescued.
Aghios Nicolas	Greece	The ship was driven ashore at Limerick, United Kingdom.
Aid	United Kingdom	The brig was driven ashore and severely damaged at Limerick. Her crew were rescued. She was refloated on 28 December and towed in to Limerick by the steamship Dover Castle (United Kingdom).
Albecore	United Kingdom	The ship was driven ashore and damaged at Kirkcudbright.
Albion	United Kingdom	The collier was abandoned at sea. Her crew were rescued. Also reported as running aground on the Sandhale, and being taken in to Grimsby, Lincolnshire in a leaky condition. She was on a voyage from Stockton-on-Tees, County Durham to Southampton, Hampshire.
Alliance	United Kingdom	The ship was driven ashore at Caernarfon.
Ann and Catherine	United Kingdom	The ship was driven ashore at Caernarfon. She was refloated on 12 January and taken in to Caernarfon.
Annechina Jantina	Netherlands	The ship was driven ashore and wrecked 2 to 3 nautical miles (3.7 to 5.6 km) west of Dungeness Lighthouse, Kent, United Kingdom. Her crew were rescued. She was on a voyage from Rotterdam, South Holland to Rouen, Seine-Inférieure, France.
Argyle	United Kingdom	The schooner was in collision with the schooner Favourite (United Kingdom) and sank off Kingstown, County Dublin. Her crew were rescued. She was on a voyage from Glasgow, Renfrewshire to Cork.
Athena	(United States)	The ship was driven ashore at Waterford, United Kingdom. She was on a voyage from Charleston, South Carolina to Liverpool, Lancashire, United Kingdom.
Beethoven	Bremen	The ship was driven on to the Motherbank, in the Solent. She was on a voyage from Bremen to Cádiz, Spain. She was refloated and taken in to Portsmouth, Hampshire, United Kingdom.
Beulah	United Kingdom	The brig was driven ashore at Spurn Point, Yorkshire. She was on a voyage from Newcastle upon Tyne, Northumberland to London. She was refloated on 9 January 1853 and towed in the Grimsby, Lincolnshire by the tug Rendel (United Kingdom.
Blossom	United Kingdom	The sloop was driven on to the Sunk Sand, in the Humber. She was on a voyage from Elie, Fife to Londonh. She was refloated and taken in to Grimsby.
Bonne Femme	Portugal	The brig was driven ashore between Hove and Shoreham-by-Sea, Sussex, United Kingdom. All eleven people on board survived. She was on a voyage from Hamburg to Lisbon.
Bouverie	United Kingdom	The barque was driven ashore and wrecked north of Port Logan, Wigtownshire with the loss of three of her crew. She was on a voyage from Liverpool to Malta.
Camden	United Kingdom	The collier foundered in the North Sea. Her crew were rescued.
Ceres	United Kingdom	The ship was driven ashore at Swansea, Glamorgan.
Ceres	United Kingdom	The ship was abandoned in the North Sea 140 nautical miles (260 km) off Peterhead, Aberdeenshire. Her crew were rescued by the schooner Modeste Berentina (Norway). Ceres was on a voyage from Lowestoft, Suffolk to Hartlepool.
Concord	United Kingdom	The ship was driven ashore and damaged at Kirkcudbright.
Conway	United Kingdom	The ship was driven ashore at Liverpool. She was on a voyage from Liverpool to New Orleans, Louisiana, United States. She was refloated on 29 December and taken in to Liverpool.
Corinthian	United Kingdom	The brig was driven ashore and wrecked at Thorpe Point, Suffolk with the loss of all hands.
Cumberland	United Kingdom	The ship was driven ashore and severely damaged at Kirkcudbright.
De Jager	Netherlands	The ship was driven ashore and wrecked at Orford, Suffolk with the loss of a crew member. She was on a voyage from Amsterdam, North Holland to London, United Kingdom.
Diligence	United Kingdom	The ship was driven ashore at Caernarfon.
Ebeneser	United Kingdom	The fishin smack foundered in the North Sea. Her crew were rescued.
E. C. Scranton	United States	The ship was driven ashore in Bootle Bay. She was on a voyage from Liverpool to New York.
Elizabeth	United Kingdom	The barque was driven ashore in Bootle Bay. She was on a voyage from Liverpool to Savannah, Georgia, United States. She was refloated on 7 January 1853.
Elizabeth	United Kingdom	The ship was driven ashore in the River Usk. She was on a voyage from Bristol, Gloucestershire to Port Phillip, Victoria.
Elizabeth and Sarah, or Sarah and Elizabeth	United Kingdom	The sloop was driven ashore and wrecked at Wilsthorpe, Yorkshire. Her crew survived. She was on a voyage from Sunderland, County Durham to Hull, Yorkshire. She was refloated on 29 December and taken in to Bridlington, Yorkshire.
Engelina	Kingdom of Hanover	The ship was abandoned in the English Channel. Her crew were rescued by Cleopatra (United Kingdom). Engelina was on a voyage from South Shields, County Durham to Cádiz, Spain.
Enterprise	United Kingdom	The Belfast-registered ship was driven ashore and severely damaged at Kirkcudbright.
Enterprise	United Kingdom	The Maryport-registered ship was driven ashore and damaged at Kirkcudbright.
Falcon	Norway	The ship was driven ashore at Limerick.
Frederic	France	The schooner sank in the English Channel off Poole, Dorset. She was on a voyage from Rouen, Seine-Inférieure to Bordeaux, Gironde. She was refloated on 21 June 1853 and taken in to Poole.
Freedom	United Kingdom	The ship was driven ashore and wrecked at Millbay, Devon.
Friends	United Kingdom	The smack was driven ashore at Abererch, Caernarfonshire.
Gamma	United Kingdom	The collier, a brig, foundered in the North Sea. Her crew were rescued by the brig Oak (United Kingdom).
George and Jane	United Kingdom	The ship was driven ashore and damaged at Kirkcudbright.
Glenaeron	United Kingdom	The schooner was driven ashore at Abererch.
Haggerstone	United Kingdom	The steamship was last sighted on this date off Filey, Yorkshire whilst on a voyage from West Hartlepool, County Durham to London. Presumed foundered with the loss of all hands.
Hope	United Kingdom	The barque capsized and sank at Fleetwood, Lancashire. She was refloated on 6 January 1853.
Hope	United Kingdom	The ship foundered in the English Channel off Berry Head, Devon. Her crew were rescued.
Hugh Ballement	United Kingdom	The ship was driven onto the Girdler Sand, off the north Kent coast. She was refloated and towed in to Gravesend, Kent.
Importer	United Kingdom	The ship was driven ashore and severely damaged at Kirkcudbright.
Independence	United Kingdom	The ship was abandoned in the North Sea. Her crew survived.
Isabella	United Kingdom	The ship was run into by Mozambique (United Kingdom) and severely damaged in the Rhymney River. Her crew were rescued by Andover (United States).
Isabella	United Kingdom	The ship was driven ashore and damaged at Kirkcudbright.
Isis	Sweden	The barque was abandoned in the Irish Sea 15 nautical miles (28 km) north east of the Calf of Man, Isle of Man with the loss of two of her crew. Survivors were rescued by Themis (United Kingdom). Isis was on a voyage from Glasgow to Licata, Sicily.
Jago	United Kingdom	The brig foundered in the North Sea 42 nautical miles (78 km) north east of Whitby, Yorkshire. Her crew were rescued by Alfred (United Kingdom). Jago was on a voyage from Blyth, Northumberland to King's Lynn, Norfolk.
Jewess	United Kingdom	The ship was driven ashore and damaged at Kirkcudbright.
John	United Kingdom	The ship was run into by Portland (United Kingdom and sank at Kirkcudbright. Her crew were rescued.
John Bright	United Kingdom	The brig was abandoned in the North Sea. A crew member was rescued by Eagle (United Kingdom).
John Burrel	United Kingdom	The ship foundered in the North Sea off Scarborough, Yorkshire. Two survivors were rescued by the barque John Arrowsmith (United Kingdom). The remainder of her crew were rescued by a Swedish brig. John Burrell was on a voyage from South Shields to London.
Johns	United Kingdom	The Yorkshire Billyboy sank at Grimsby, Lincolnshire. Her crew were rescued. She was on a voyage from Maldon, Essex to Wakefield, Yorkshire.
John White	United Kingdom	The collier was wrecked. Her crew survived.
Julius Caesar	United Kingdom	The ship was driven ashore in St. Bride's Bay. She was on a voyage from Newport, Monmouthshire to Mobile, Alabama, United States. She was later refloated.
Lilly	United Kingdom	The ship was driven ashore on the Calf of Man with the loss of five of her crew. She was on a voyage from Liverpool to Africa. She blew up the next day with the loss of all on board - local inhabitants and some of her crew, 37 people.
Lochinvar	United Kingdom	The ship was driven ashore on Holy Isle, in the Firth of Clyde. She was on a voyage from Stettin to Liverpool. She was refloated and towed in to Troon, Ayrshire for repairs.
Louisa and Emelia	Hamburg	The barque was driven ashore and wrecked 2 to 3 nautical miles (3.7 to 5.6 km) west of Dungeness Lighthouse with the loss of 45 of the 84 people on board. Survivors were rescued by the Coast Guard. She was on a voyage from Hamburg to the Rio Grande.
Magnet	United Kingdom	The brig foundered in the North Sea off Flamborough Head, Yorkshire. Her crew were rescued by the brig Nereid (United Kingdom). Magnet was on a voyage from Seaham, County durham to London.
Marie Auguste	France	The ship sank at Saint-Vaast-la-Hougue, Manche. She was on a voyage from Bordeaux, Gironde to Dieppe, Seine-Inférieure.
Marion	United Kingdom	The brig foundered in the North Sea with the loss of all hands.
Mary and Jessie	United Kingdom	The ship was driven ashore and wrecked at Kirkcudbright.
Mary Ann	United Kingdom	The ship was abandoned in the River Mersey. She was subsequently towed in to Liverpool by a tug.
Mary Henny	United Kingdom	The ship was driven ashore north of Maryport, Cumberland. She was on a voyage from Kingstown to Maryport. She was refloated on 15 January 1853 and taken in to Maryport.
Meldon	United Kingdom	The ship foundered in the North Sea 22 nautical miles (41 km) off Tynemouth Castle, Northumberland. Her crew were rescued by Coronation (United Kingdom).
Mirago	Greece	The ship was driven ashore at Limerick.
Naiad	United Kingdom	The ship was driven ashore at Weymouth, Dorset. She was on a voyage from London to the West Indies. She was refloated on 31 January 1853.
Nouvelle Loire	France	The barque was wrecked at Chesil Beach, Dorset, United Kingdom.
Nuova Fortuna	Malta	The ship was wrecked at Stranraer, Wigtownshire, United Kingdom with the loss of three of her crew. She was on a voyage from Liverpool to Malta.
Omega	United Kingdom	The schooner was wrecked at Bristolwith the loss of all hands.
Onward	United Kingdom	The ship was driven ashore at Llanddwyn. She was on a voyage from Liverpool to New Orleans, Louisiana, United States. She was refloated on 9 February 1853 and towed back to Liverpool, where she arrived on 11 February.
Pink	United Kingdom	The ship was driven ashore and damaged at Kirkcudbright.
Pioneer	United Kingdom	The ship foundered in the North Sea off Great Yarmouth, Norfolk with the loss of four of her crew. Survivors were rescued by the Great Yarmouth Lifeboat. She was on a voyage from London to the River Tyne.
Portland	United Kingdom	The ship was driven ashore and damaged at Kirkcudbright.
Prince of Orange	Hamburg	The ship was driven ashore on Sylt, Duchy of Holstein. She was on a voyage from Hamburg to Leith, Lothian.
Sarah	United Kingdom	The ship was driven ashore and wrecked at Lyme Regis. All on board were rescued. She was on a voyage from Lyme Regis to Guernsey, Channel Islands.
Sea	United Kingdom	The ship was driven ashore and wrecked at Wainfleet, Lincolnshire.
Somes	United Kingdom	The ship was driven ashore and damaged at Kirkcudbright.
Sultan	United Kingdom	The ship was driven ashore at Mount Batten, Devon. She was on a voyage from London to Waterford.
Thomas Wood	United Kingdom	The ship was abandoned in the North Sea. Her crew survived.
Tintern	United Kingdom	The ship was driven ashore at Porthcawl, Glamorgan, or Troon, Ayrshire.
William Glenn Anderson	United Kingdom	The ship was driven ashore near Christchurch Head, Dorset.

== 28 December ==
List of shipwrecks: 28 December 1852
Ship	State	Description
Alexander Johnstone	United Kingdom	The ship ran aground on the West Hoyle Bank, in Liverpool Bay. Her crew were rescued by the Point of Ayr Lifeboat. She was on a voyage from Demerara, British Guiana to Liverpool, Lancashire. Alexander Johnstone was later refloated with the assistance of the tug Independence (United Kingdom) and towed in to Birkenhead, Cheshire, where she was beached.
Amulet	United States	The ship sprang a leak and foundered in the Atlantic Ocean with the loss of fifteen of her crew. She was on a voyage from Boston, Massachusetts to Cette, Hérault, France.
Andover	United States	The ship was driven ashore at Porthcawl, Glamorgan, United Kingdom. She was subsequently drive into by Mozambique (United Kingdom).
Atlas	United Kingdom	The ship was driven ashore 17 nautical miles (31 km) south of Whitehaven, Cumberland.
Breeze	United Kingdom	The ship foundered off Tynemouth Castle, Northumberland. Her crew were rescued.
Brunswick	United Kingdom	The ship was driven ashore 12 nautical miles (22 km) south of Whitehaven.
Calder	United Kingdom	The ship was driven ashore and wrecked at Crookhaven, County Cork. She was on a voyage from New York, United States to Liverpool. She was refloated in February 1853 and towed in to Liverpool, where she arrived on 9 February.
Catherine	United Kingdom	The sloop was wrecked on the Trinity Sand, in the North Sea off the coast of Lincolnshire. She was on a voyage from the Firth of Forth to London.
Childe Harold	United Kingdom	The barque was into Gipsy Queen (United Kingdom and then driven ashore at Piel Island, Lancashire. She was on a voyage from Liverpool to Mobile, Alabama, United States.
Commercial Packet	United Kingdom	The ship was abandoned in the North Sea off Tynemouth Castle, Northumberland. Her crew were rescued by Vigilant (United Kingdom). Commercial Packet was on a voyage from Sunderland, County Durham to Colchester, Essex.
Edward	United Kingdom	The ship was presumed to have foundered in Liverpool Bay with the loss of all hands. She was on a voyage from Cartagena, Spain to Liverpool.
Emulous	United Kingdom	The ship ran aground off the coast of Glamorgan. She was on a voyage from the Mumbles to the Azores. She was refloated and taken in to Swansea.
Express	United Kingdom	The ship foundered in the North Sea 40 nautical miles (74 km) off Dundee, Forfarshire. Her crew were rescued.
Gipsy Queen	United Kingdom	The ship was driven into by the barque Childe Harold (United Kingdom) and was then driven ashore on Piel Island.
Halcyon	United Kingdom	The ship was driven ashore at Sandhale, Lincolnshire. She was refloated and taken in to Grimsby, Lincolnshire in a leaky condition.
Hebe	United Kingdom	The ship was driven ashore 17 nautical miles (31 km) south of Whitehaven.
Henrietta Emden	United Kingdom	The ship was driven ashore at Great Yarmouth, Norfolk. She was later refloated and taken in to Great Yarmouth.
Industry	United Kingdom	The Humber Keel sprang a leak and was abandoned in the North Sea 25 nautical miles (46 km) off Flamborough Head, Yorkshire. Her crew were rescued by the smack Welcome Home (United Kingdom). Industry was on a voyage from Newcastle upon Tyne, Northumberland to London.
Jane	United Kingdom	The brig was driven ashore and severely damaged at Milford Haven, Pembrokeshire.
John	United Kingdom	The ship was driven ashore at Helsingør, Denmark. She was on avoyage from Riga, Russia to Hull, Yorkshire.
John and Margaret	United Kingdom	The brig was abandoned in the North Sea 70 nautical miles (130 km) east south east of the Farne Islands, Northumberland. Her crew were rescued by the brig Antias (Belgium). John and Margaret was on a voyage from Seaham, County Durham to London.
Juno	(Russian Empire) Grand Duchy of Finland	The barque was wrecked at Rhosneigr, Anglesey, United Kingdom. Her crew were rescued. She was on a voyage from Liverpool to Málaga, Spain.
Lady Campbell	(United Kingdom of Great Britain and Ireland) British North America	The brigantine was wrecked at Louisburg, Nova Scotia.
Magdalene	United Kingdom	The brig was discovered abandoned in the North Sea 40 nautical miles (74 km) off Scarborough, Yorkshire by the smack Fawn (United Kingdom), which put two hands on board and took her in tow. She subsequently sank with the loss of both lives. Magdalene was on a voyage from Sunderland to London.
Mary Ann	United Kingdom	The ship was driven ashore and severely damaged at Milford Haven.
Merry Henny	United Kingdom	The ship was driven ashore at Maryport, Cumberland. She was on a voyage from Kingstown, County Dublin to Maryport.
Messenger	United Kingdom	The ship was abandoned in the North Sea 80 nautical miles (150 km) off Tynemouth Castle. Her crew were rescued.
Midas	United Kingdom	The ship was abandoned in the North Sea off Flamborough Head. Her crew were rescued. She was on a voyage from London to Seaham, County Durham.
New Draper	United Kingdom	The ship was driven ashore 17 nautical miles (31 km) south of Whitehaven.
North Star	(United Kingdom of Great Britain and Ireland) Jersey	The brig foundered in the Dogger Bank. Her crew were rescued by a barque. She was on a voyage from Jersey to Newcastle upon Tyne.
Orient	Malta	The ship was beached at Great Yarmouth. She was on a voyage from London to Cardiff, Glamorgan. She was refloated and taken in to Great Yarmouth.
Oscar	United Kingdom	The schooner was driven ashore at Falmouth, Cornwall. She was on a voyage from Tarragona, Spain to London.
Queen Adelaide	United Kingdom	The smack was driven ashore and severely damaged at Milford Haven.
Rafael	Mexico	The ship was driven ashore and severely damaged at Falmouth. She was on a voyage from Mazatlan, Cuba to Liverpool.
Rambler	United Kingdom	The ship was abandoned at sea. Her crew were rescued. She was on a voyage from the River Tyne to Bridport, Dorset.
Sally	United Kingdom	The smack sank at Ardglass, County Down.
Sophia	United Kingdom	The ship was driven ashore at Penzance, Cornwall. She was refloated on 13 January 1853 and taken in to Penzance.
St. George	United Kingdom	The ship struck a reef off Port Phillip Heads, Victoria and was beached. All on board were rescued. She was on a voyage from London to Port Phillip, Victoria.
St. Helens	United Kingdom	The brig ran aground in on the North Spit, in Liverpool Bay and was abandoned. Her crew were rescued by the steamship Vesta (United Kingdom). St. Helens was on a voyage from Montreal, Province of Canada, British North America to Liverpool.
Tweed	United Kingdom	The ship was driven ashore at Falmouth. She was on a voyage from Leith, Lothian to Palmermo, Sicily.
Veronica	United Kingdom	The ship ran aground on the Cork Sand, in the North Sea off the coast of Suffolk. She was refloated and taken in to Harwich, Essex.
Wanderer	United Kingdom	The barque was wrecked at Bolt Head, Devon with loss of life.
Wave Packet	United Kingdom	The smack was driven ashore on Sunk Island, Yorkshire. She was on a voyage from Hartlepool, County Durham to Rochester, Kent.
Wesley	United Kingdom	The ship foundered in the North Sea off Whitby, Yorkshire. Her crew were rescued by Earl of Newburgh (United Kingdom).
William and Mary	United Kingdom	The barque was wrecked on the Gunfleet Sand, in the North Sea off the coast of Essex. Her seventeen crew were rescued by the smacks Emperor and Traveller (United Kingdom).

== 29 December ==
List of shipwrecks: 29 December 1852
Ship	State	Description
Active	United Kingdom	The flat was driven ashore in the River Dee 2 nautical miles (3.7 km) downstream of Parkgate, Cheshire. Her crew were rescued. She was on a voyage from Chester, Cheshire to Holyhead, Anglesey.
Alcibides	Greece	The brig was driven ashore and wrecked in Ballyteague Bay with the loss of all ten crew. She was on a voyage from Galaţi, Ottoman Empire to Queenstown, County Cork, United Kingdom.
Alice	United Kingdom	The sloop was driven ashore at Patrington, Yorkshire. She was on a voyage from London to Goole, Yorkshire. She was refloated and taken in to Hull, Yorkshire.
Ann	United Kingdom	The ship was driven ashore in Tramore Bay. Her crew were rescued. She was on a voyage from Odesa to Waterford.
Brewer's Hall	United Kingdom	The flat was driven ashore in the River Dee 1.5 nautical miles (2.8 km) from Parkgate. Her crew were rescued.
Broad Oak	United Kingdom	The ship was wrecked in Dunlagh Bay with the loss of ten of her fifteen crew. She was on a voyage from Pernambuco, Brazil to Liverpool, Lancashire.
Catherine Wilhelmine	Netherlands	The ship was driven ashore at the mouth of the Agger Canal. All on board were rescued. She was on a voyage from Leith, Lothian, United Kingdom to Hamburg.
Ceres	United Kingdom	The ship was driven ashore at Porthcawl, Glamorgan.
Chevalier	United Kingdom	The ship was driven ashore at Whitehaven, Cumberland. She was on a voyage from Liverpool to Trinidad.
Duchess of Lancaster	United Kingdom	The sloop rang aground at the mouth of the River Duddon and capsized with the loss of four of her crew. She was on a voyage from Dundalk, County Louth to Preston, Lancashire. She was righted and taken in to Ulverstone, Lancashire in a wrecked condition.
Elijah	United Kingdom	The ship was driven ashore and wrecked at Lowestoft, Suffolk. she was on a voyage from Hartlepool, County Durham to Cartagena, Spain.
Helen	United Kingdom	The ship was in collision with a brig off Cape St. Vincent, Portugal. She was consequently abandoned the next day. Her crew were rescued. She was on a voyage from Brăila, Ottoman Empire to Falmouth, Cornwall.
James	(United Kingdom of Great Britain and Ireland) Jersey	The cutter was wrecked on the Hermitage Rocks, in the Channel Islands. She was on a voyage from Jersey to Cardiff, Glamorgan.
Liebre	Spain	The brigantine was wrecked on "Roe Island". All on board were rescued. She was on a voyage from Liverpool to Cádiz.
Lively	United Kingdom	The sloop was driven ashore and wrecked at Dunfanaghy, County Donegal. Her crew were rescued. She was on a voyage from Inishmaan, County Galway to the Clyde.
Lotus	United Kingdom	The ship sank in the North Sea 33 nautical miles (61 km) south east of Flamborough Head, Yorkshire. Her crew were rescued by Sarah Mills (United Kingdom). Lotus was on a voyage from Hartlepool to London.
Lucina	Prussia	The ship was driven ashore and wrecked at Søndervig, Denmark. Her crew were rescued. She was on a voyage from Newcastle upon Tyne, Northumberland, United Kingdom to Cartagena, Spain.
Margaret	United Kingdom	The brig was driven ashore at "Polwarth", Cornwall. She was on a voyage from Marseille, Bouches-du-Rhône, France to the Clyde. She was refloated on 31 December.
Maria	United Kingdom	The ship was wrecked on "Roe Island".
Maria	United Kingdom	The ship sank at the Mumbles, Glamorgan. She was on a voyage from Cardiff to Bideford, Devon.
Maria	United Kingdom	The ship sank off Flamborough Head. Her crew were rescued by Pearl (United Kingdom). Maria was on a voyage from Hartlepool to Poole, Dorset.
Maria	United Kingdom	The ship was in collision with Freedom (United Kingdom) and sank in the North Sea.
Mary	United Kingdom	The brig sprang a leak and was beached south of Warkworth, Northumberland.
Millbay	United Kingdom	The ship was driven ashore at St. Minver, Cornwall. She was on a voyage from Bristol, Gloucestershire to São Miguel Island, Azores.
Piscataqua	United States	The ship was driven ashore at Newport, Monmouthshire, United Kingdom. She was on a voyage from Newport to New Orleans, Louisiana. She was refloated on 31 December and resumed her voyage.
Rhine	United Kingdom	The ship was driven ashore at Newport. She was on a voyage from Newport to New York, United States. She was refloated on 31 December and resumed her voyage.
Robert and Ellen	United Kingdom	The ship was abandoned in the North Sea 115 nautical miles (213 km) off Lindesnes, Norway. Her nine crew were rescued by Eendracht (Flag unknown).
Sally	United Kingdom	The ship was driven ashore on the coast of Cumberland. She was on a voyage from Quebec City, Province of Canada, British North America to Carlisle, Cumberland.
Selim	United Kingdom	The ship was driven ashore at Bonmahon, County Waterford. She was on a voyage from Alexandria, Egypt to Liverpool.
Symbol	United Kingdom	The ship, which had sprung a leak on 27 December, foundered in the North Sea 35 nautical miles (65 km) off Tynemouth, Northumberland. Her crew were rescued by Shelagh (United Kingdom). Symbol was on a voyage from Seaham, County Durham to Colchester, Essex.
Wilhelmine	Kingdom of Hanover	The ship was driven ashore and wrecked at Søndervig, Denmark. Her crew were rescued. She was on a voyage from Stockton-on-Tees, County Durham to Hamburg.
William	United Kingdom	The ship was driven ashore at Wainfleet, Lincolnshire. She was refloated.

== 30 December ==
List of shipwrecks: 30 December 1852
Ship	State	Description
Brilliant	United Kingdom	The ship was driven ashore on Foulney Island, Lancashire.
Gem	United Kingdom	The ship was driven ashore at Neath, Glamorgan.
George IV	United Kingdom	The ship was abandoned in the North Sea. Her crew were rescued.
Josina Henrietta	Netherlands	The ship was driven on to the Baron of Ballyteague. Her crew were rescued. She was on a voyage from Vicuña, Chile to Drogheda, County Louth, United Kingdom.
Lester	United Kingdom	The ship sank in the North Sea off the coast of Lincolnshire. Her crew were rescued. She was on a voyage from Seaham, County Durham to London.
Merchant	United Kingdom	The ship was driven ashore in the Farne Islands, Northumberland. She was refloated on 31 January 1853 and towed in to the River Tyne.
Sclim	United Kingdom	The ship was driven ashore at "Boumahere", County Waterford. She was on a voyage from Alexandria, Egypt to Liverpool.
Sir Robert Peel	United Kingdom	The ship was driven ashore on Foulney Island.
Susannah	United Kingdom	The ship was driven ashore on Foulney Island.
Woodside	United States	The ship was wrecked on the Florida Reef. She was on a voyage from Mobile, Alabama to Rochefort, Charente-Inférieure.
Zephyr	United Kingdom	The ship was driven ashore near Wexford.

== 31 December ==
List of shipwrecks: 31 December 1852
Ship	State	Description
Aghios Trises Curleses	Greece	The ship ran aground on the Dromore Bank, in the Irish Sea. She was on a voyage from Brăila, Ottoman Empire to Waterford, United Kingdom. She was refloated.
Emma	Wismar	The brig was driven ashore near "Tragoe", Norway.
Helena	United Kingdom	The ship was driven ashore and wrecked at "Susa", on the Barbary Coast, Morocco. She was on a voyage from Malta to Queenstown, County Cork.
Maria	United Kingdom	The ship was driven ashore and wrecked at Roundstone, County Galway. She was on a voyage from Glasgow, Renfrewshire to Grenada and Saint Vincent.
Vigilant	United Kingdom	The ship was driven ashore at Lindesnes, Norway. She was on a voyage from Danzig to London. She was refloated on 9 January 1853 and taken in to Mandal, Norway.

== Unknown date ==
List of shipwrecks: Unknown date in December 1852
Ship	State	Description
Abeona	United Kingdom	The ship was driven ashore at King's Lynn, Norfolk. She was refloated on 5 December.
Active	United Kingdom	The sloop was driven ashore on Borkum, Kingdom of Hanover. She was on a voyage from Sunderland, County Durham to King's Lynn. She was refloated and taken in to Grimsby, Lincolnshire, where she arrived on 29 December.
Adelia Ann	United Kingdom	The ship was driven ashore and severely damaged at Port Talbot, Glamorgan. She was on a voyage from Cork to Port Talbot. She was refloated on 25 December.
Agnes	United Kingdom	The ship was driven ashore at Whitehaven, Cumberland.
Alinda	(United Kingdom of Great Britain and Ireland) New South Wales	The ship was wrecked at Eddystone Point, Van Diemen's Land before 25 December.
Auguste	France	The ship was lost before 9 December whilst on a voyage from Dieppe, Seine-Inférieure to La Rochelle, Charente-Maritime.
Bannockburn	United Kingdom	The brig was driven ashore in the Mississippi River before 18 December. She was on a voyage from Philadelphia, Pennsylvania to New Orleans, Louisiana, United States. She was later refloated and taken into Mobile, Alabama.
Bentley	United Kingdom	The ship was lost in the Baltic Sea before 5 December.
British Queen	United Kingdom	The ship was driven ashore neas Machias, Maine, United States before 6 December. She was on a voyage from Saint John, New Brunswick to Newcastle upon Tyne, Northumberland. She was consequently condemned.
Caroline	United Kingdom	The sloop was driven ashore and severely damaged at Killerness Point, County Down. She was on a voyage from Newry, County Antrim to Douglas, Isle of Man. She was refloated and taken in to Dromore, County Down.
Camargo	United States	After illegally delivering 500 enslaved Mozambiquans to a coffee plantation in what is now Santa Rita do Bracuí, Brazil, the slave ship's captain, Nathaniel Gordon, anchored her in the mouth of the Bracuí River on the southeastern coast of Brazil, set her on fire, and escaped dressed as a woman. She burned and sank. Her wreck was located off the northeastern tip of Little Cunhanbebe Island on in December 2023.
Celebrity	United Kingdom	The ship was driven ashore at Rhoscolyn, Anglesey with loss of life, including that of her captain.
Daphne	France	The ship was wrecked on the coast of Gironde before 4 December.
Emma	United Kingdom	The ship was wrecked on the coast of Gironde before 4 December. She was on a voyage from Shoreham-by-Sea, Sussex to the Charente.
Engelina	Kingdom of Hanover	The schooner was lost on her maiden voyage. Her crew were rescued.
Fredericke	United Kingdom	The ship was driven ashore at Hartlepool, County Durham. She was refloated on 13 December and taken in to Hartlepool.
Fulton	(United Kingdom of Great Britain and Ireland) British North America	The ship was driven ashore on the Saint Croix Reef before 3 December. She was on a voyage from Jamaica to Cuba.
Geelong	United Kingdom	The steamship foundered in the Bay of Biscay. Her crew were rescued. She was on a voyage from Belfast, County Antrim to Australia.
Helen	United Kingdom	The ship was lost in late December. Her crew were rescued.
Henry	United Kingdom	The schooner ran aground on the Sunk Sand, in the Humber. She was on a voyage from Great Yarmouth, Norfolk to Newcastle upon Tyne. She was refloated and taken in to Grimsby.
Hope	United Kingdom	The ship was driven ashore on the Île d'Yeu, Vendée before 4 December.
Iris	United Kingdom	The ship departed from South Shields, County Durham for Southampton, Hampshire in late December. No further trace, presumed foundered with the loss of all hands.
James Pennell	United States	The barque capsized off Cape Horn, Chile. Her crew were rescued by Faderneslandet (Norway).
Johann	Sweden	The ship was wrecked at Mimizan, Landes, France. She was on a voyage from Karlskrona to Bilbao, Spain.
John Robertson	United Kingdom	The brig was abandoned in the Atlantic Ocean (46°02′N 8°42′W. Her nine crew were rescued by the brig Niord (United Kingdom). John Robertson was on a voyage from Newcastle upon Tyne to Barcelona, Spain.
Kassari	Netherlands	The brig was driven ashore at "Muka", on the north coast of Borneo, Netherlands East Indies before 24 December. She was plundered by the local inhabitants.
Kennard	United Kingdom	The ship was wrecked on the coast of Charente-Maritime before 4 December. Crew presumed lost. She was on a voyage from Sunderland to the Charente.
Lima	(United Kingdom of Great Britain and Ireland) British North America	The ship sank off Petty Harbour, Newfoundland with the loss of at least four of her crew. She was on a voyage from Porto, Portugal to St. John's, Newfoundland.
Maldon	United Kingdom	The ship foundered in the North Sea off the coast of Northumberland in late December.
Maria	Netherlands	The koff was abandoned in the North Sea before 26 December.
Maria	United Kingdom	The ship was lost in late December with the loss of all but one of her crew. The survivor was rescued by John (United Kingdom).
Marian	United Kingdom	The ship was driven ashore between Ravenglass and St. Bees, Cumberland. She was on a voyage from Glasgow, Renfrewshire to the West Indies.
Marie	United Kingdom	The ship was lost in late December with the loss of all but one of her crew.
Mount Vernon	United States	The ship was driven ashore on the coast of the Province of Canada before 24 December. She was on a voyage from Saguenay, Province of Canada to an English port. She was refloated and taken in to Quebec City for repairs.
Nile	United Kingdom	The ship was driven ashore south west of Vizagapatam, India before 23 December. She was on a voyage from Calcutta to Madras. She was refloated and resumed her voyage.
Olinda	(United Kingdom of Great Britain and Ireland) Victoria	The ship was wrecked at Eddystone Point, Van Diemen's Land before 23 December. She was on a voyage from Hobart to Port Phillip.
Perfection	United Kingdom	The ship was lost in late December. Her crew were rescued.
Prince of Wales	United Kingdom	The Yorkshire Billyboy capsized and was driven ashore at Cleethorpes, Lincolnshire. She was on a voyage from London to Hull, Yorkshire. She was later refloated and taken in to Grimsby, Lincolnshire.
Roseberry	United Kingdom	The ship was lost before 31 December. Her crew survived. She was on a voyage from Hartlepool to London.
Sarepta	United Kingdom	The ship was driven ashore at King's Lynn. She was refloated on 5 December.
Sisters	United Kingdom	The brig was abandoned in the Atlantic Ocean in late December. Her crew were rescued. She was on a voyage from Boston, Massachusetts, United States to Liverpool, Lancashire. Sisters was towed in to Tory Island, County Donegal on 23 January 1853.
Sovereign	United Kingdom	The ship was wrecked off Cape Breton Island, Nova Scotia, British North America. She was on a voyage from Prince Edward Island, British North America to the Bristol Channel.
St. George	United Kingdom	The ship was abandoned off Tynemouth, Northumberland. Her crew were rescued.
Sultan	United Kingdom	The ship struck a sunken rock and was damaged. She put in to Callao, Peru on 11 December.
Vixen	United Kingdom	The ship ran aground on the Duxberry Reef and was damaged. She was on a voyage from London to San Francisco, California, United States. She was refloated and completed her voyage, arriving at San Francisco on 5 December.
