= Getterön Nature Reserve =

Nature reserve in Sweden

Coordinates: 57°7′36.34″N 12°14′50.47″E

Designations

Ramsar Wetland
- Official name: Getterön
- Designated: 5 December 1974
- Reference no.: 19

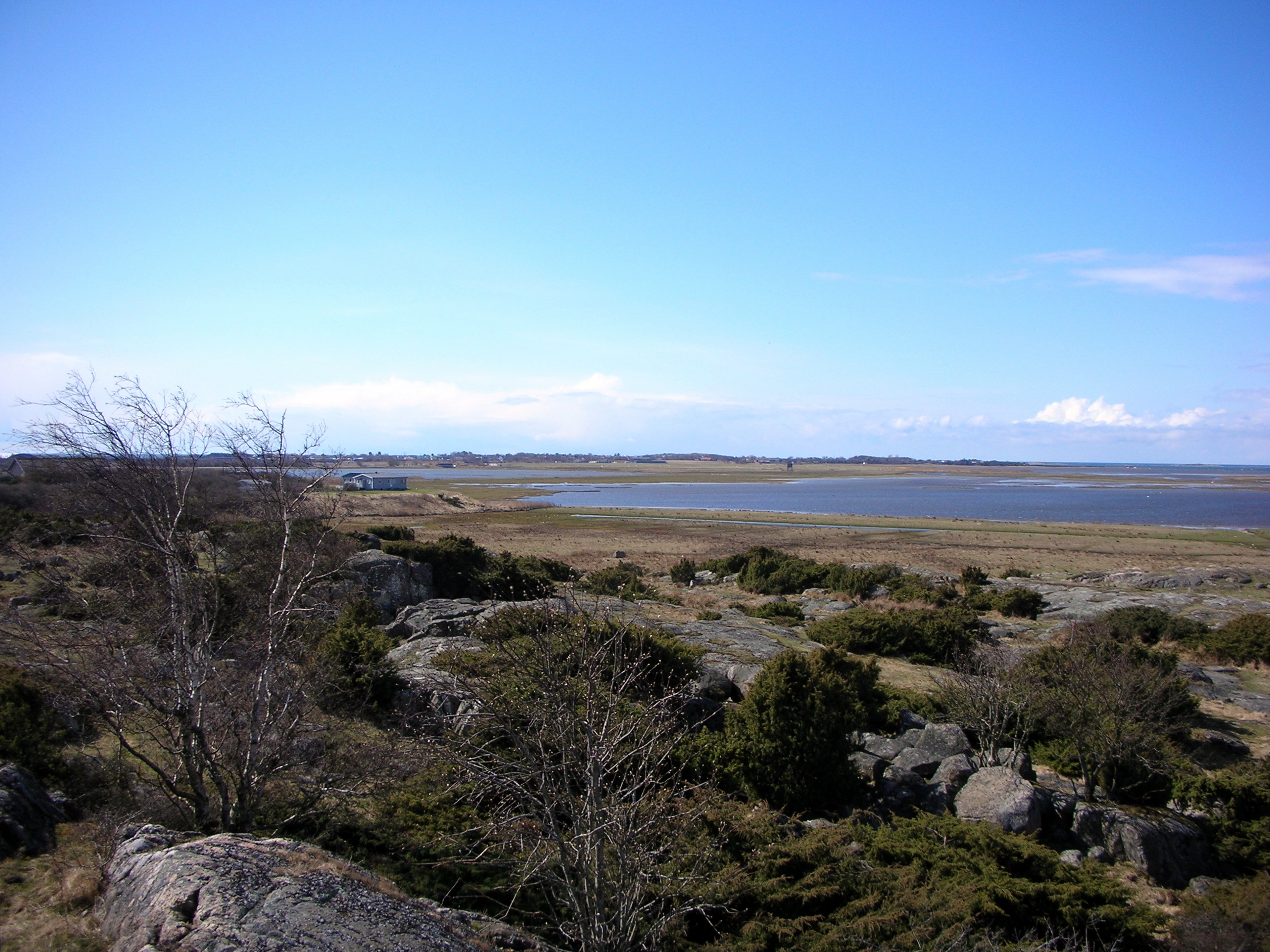
View of Getterön Nature Reserve.

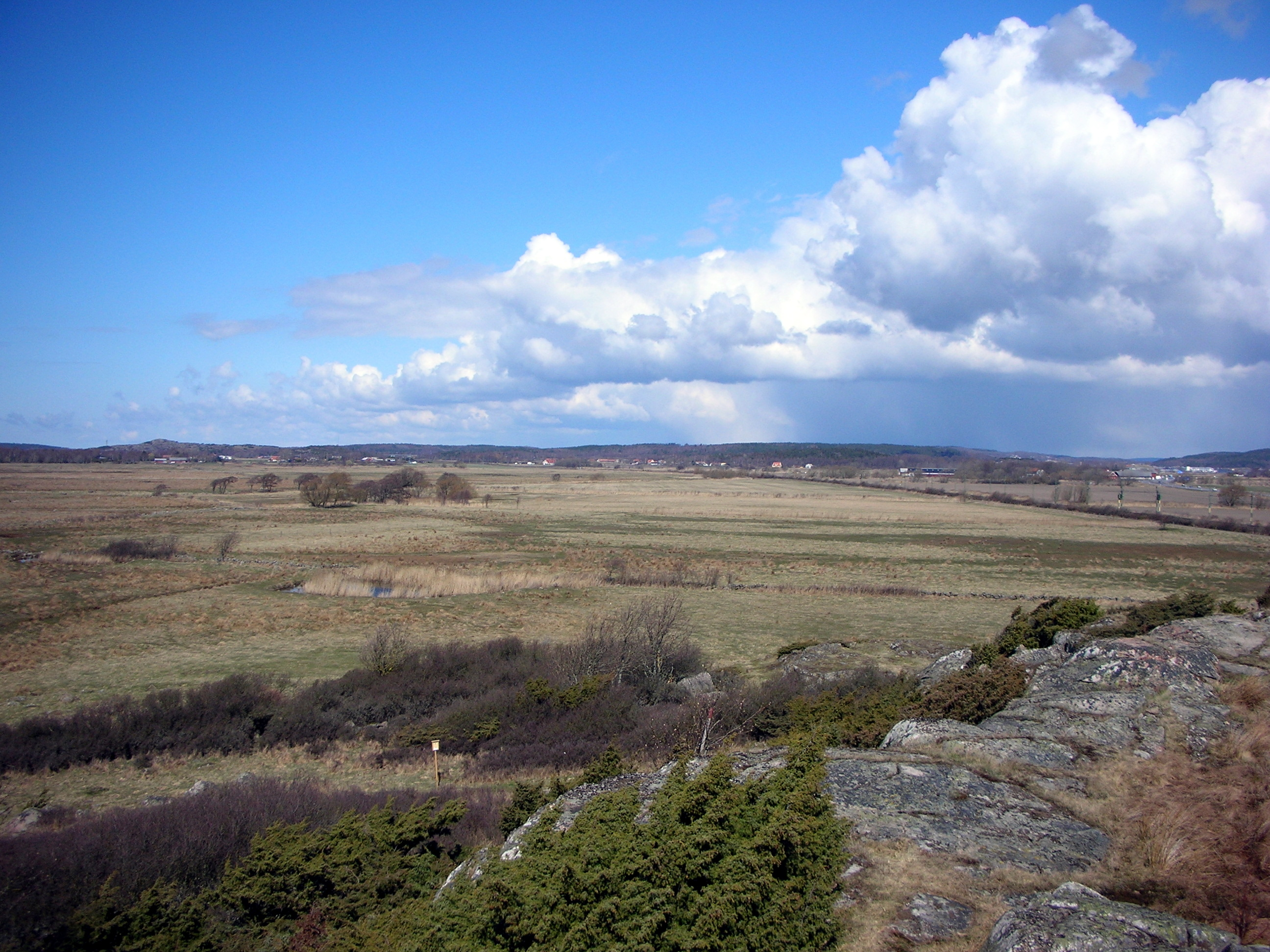
View of Getterön Nature Reserve.

Getterön Nature Reserve (Swedish: Getteröns naturreservat) is a nature reserve at Getterön in Varberg Municipality, Sweden. It consists of parts of the peninsula Getterön and an area to the north. It has an area of 350 hectares, of which 235 are land. The reserve was established in 1970.

Getterön Nature Reserve is protected as a Natura 2000 site and included in the Ramsar list.

Getterön Nature Reserve is one of northern Europe's premier birdwatching sites. In the reserve's wetland nesting species like gadwall, garganey, black-tailed godwit, ruff, dunlin, little tern, and pied avocet. The pied avocet also serves as a symbol for the nature reserve. Also in the winters there are many different species at Getterön, for example little grebe, water rail, common kingfisher, Eurasian bittern, bearded reedling, whooper swan, and smew. Also birds of prey, like the peregrine falcon, are common.

== History ==
The wetlands at Getterön were created in the 1930s, when the shallow strait between the mainland and Getterön was filled out. Two bays were created, one on each side of the artificial isthmus.

In the southern bay, the Port of Varberg is located. In the northern bay, where the stream Himleån flows into the Kattegat, dredged material from the harbor was dumped, which made the bay smaller and shallower. This meant that the wetlands were formed. Soon, many bird species were nesting here, and the birdwatchers flocked to.

Slowly, the bay became smaller, thereby undermining the quality of the wetland as a bird area. In the 1990s there was a restoration of the area, and areas with reeds were replaced with open water and shore meadows. A pond with several small islands where the birds can nest was constructed.

== Activity ==
There is an information center at the nature reserve, with a café and toilets. There is also an exhibition about the nature reserve, and spotting scopes through which the visitors can look out over the nature reserve. There are also temporary art and photography exhibitions in the building.
