= Himleån =

Coordinates: 57°08′N 12°15′E

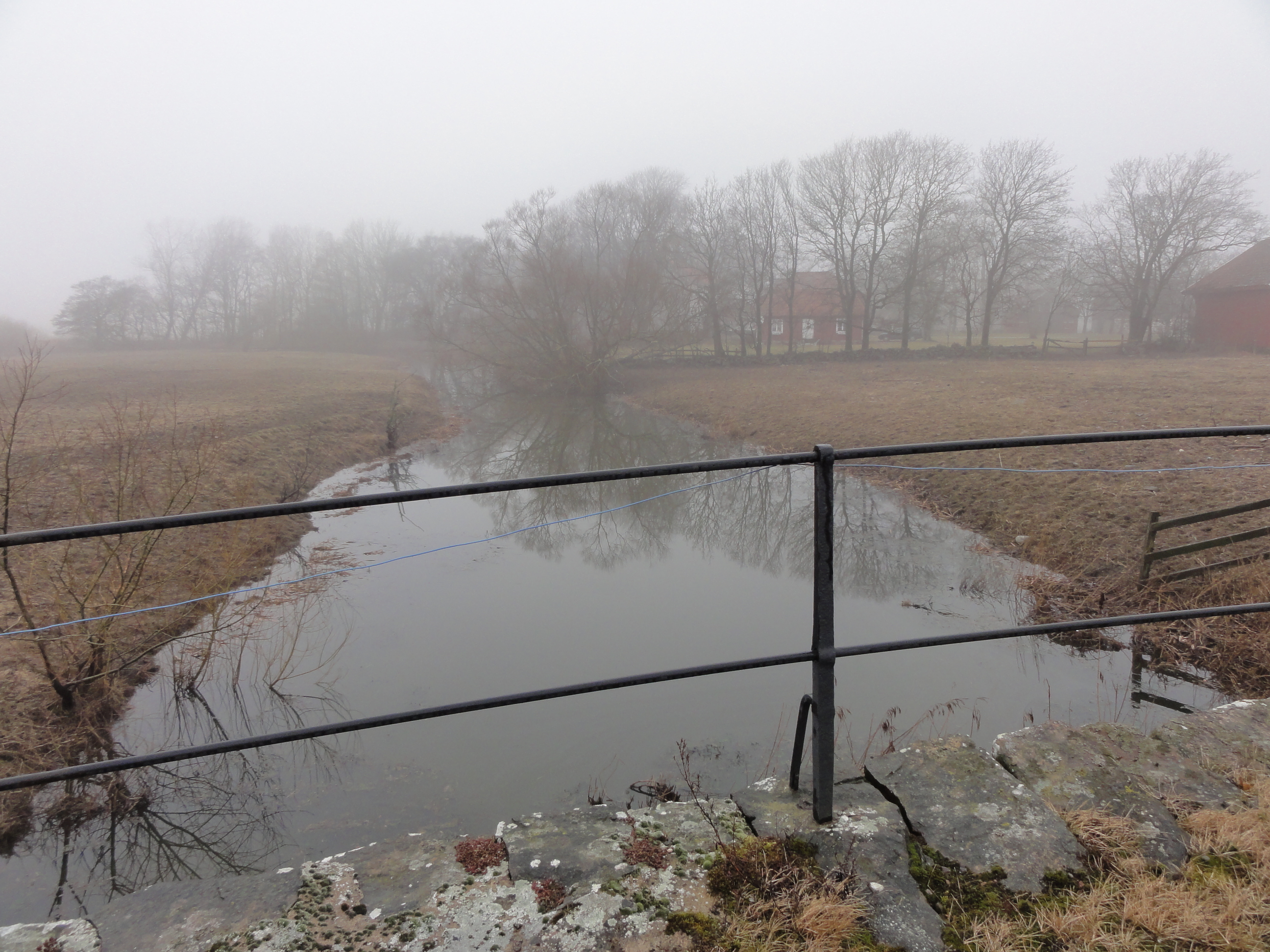

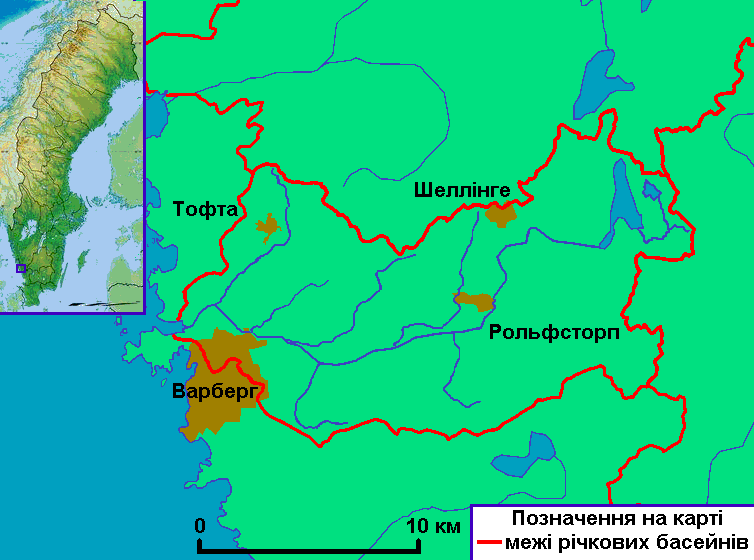
- Map of Himleån's drainage basin.

Location
- Country: Sweden
- County: Halland

Physical characteristics
- Length: 38 km (24 mi)
- Basin size: 201.3 km^{2} (77.7 sq mi)

Himleån is a river in Sweden.
