= Sir Fowell Buxton (ship) =

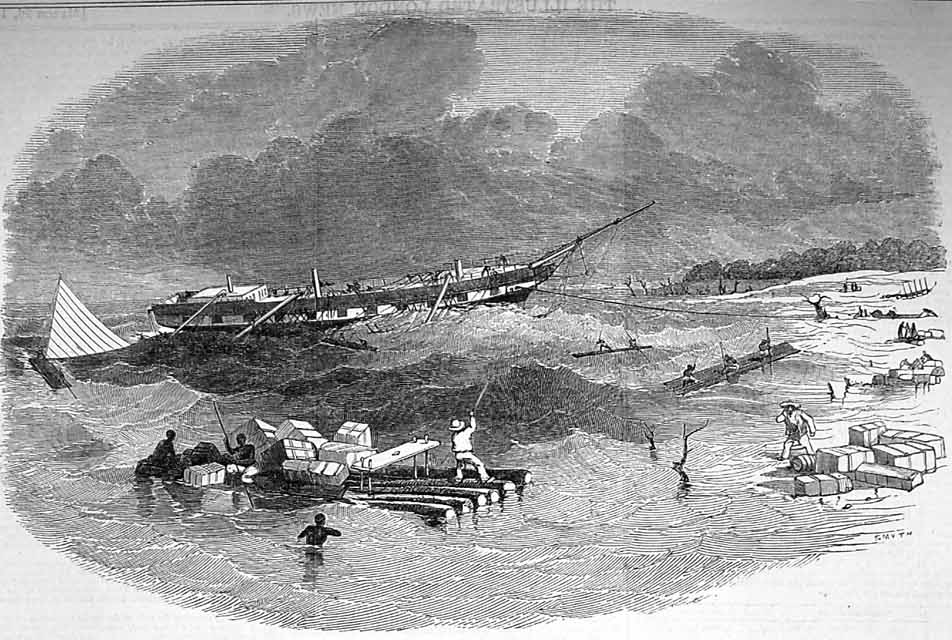
- The barque Sir Fowel Buxton on shore at Capin Assu, on the north-east coast of Brazil

History

United Kingdom
- Owner: Peter Tindall
- Launched: 1851
- Fate: Wrecked 1852

General characteristics
- Tons burthen: 446

Sir Fowell Buxton was a ship of 446 tons. She was registered in the port of London in 1851 and served the Australian Line of Packets. Sir Thomas Fowell Buxton was a noted British abolitionist. Her first captain was John Hacker, and at the time of her last voyage her master was George Woodcock.

== Final voyage ==
Having already left London 22 October 1852, the Sir Fowell Buxton left Plymouth, Devonshire on Tuesday 9 November 1852 for what would be her final voyage with 230 on board bound for Geelong and Port Phillip. Thursday 16 December 1852, she struck Tapioca Shoals off the coast of Brazil, north of Cape San Roque in the state of Rio Grande do Norte. There were no deaths.

Natives came aboard in catamarans. The passengers and crew landed on the sands the following Tuesday. Very few tree boughs provided protection from the sun. The shipwrecked had some biscuits, and fish the Natives had given them. Plus cocoa nuts and melon seeds. The following Friday the masts were cut away and the luggage removed. Some people were injured and many boxes cut open in the hold by the natives. The Survivors remained in Capin Assu for a week and three days.

They were moved in canoes to Macau where several houses were in a row and they were fed some beef. It was here they wrote to the English Consul. The Consul from Pernambuco came to Macau where the shipwrecked souls had remained for some time. He said they should all go there. Several were in vessels and went as far as the mouth of the river when another Consul (this one from Paraiba) ordered the vessels back stating later that they were wrecked in the Paraiban district and under his care they would be sent to Paraiba. After more than 2 months in Macau and a week on a small vessel they arrived in Paraiba 1 March 1853.

The Richard had just arrived, a small miserable brig the Consul had chartered to take the survivors on to Australia. After spending a month in Paraiba they boarded the "Richard" 1 April 1853. (Later 13 of their fellow passengers who went ashore in Cabedelo died from Yellow Fever). A week after they left Cabedelo they arrived in Pernambuco.

The Richard arrived Port Philip Tuesday 5 July 1853 after 3 months at sea. Her passengers remained onboard until the following Saturday.
