= Getterön =

Swedish peninsula

Geography
- Coordinates: 57°07′15″N 12°12′57″E

Administration
- Sweden
- Province: Halland
- County: Halland County
- Municipality: Varberg Municipality

Getterön is a peninsula in Varberg Municipality, Halland County, Sweden, immediately northwest of the municipal seat Varberg.

Getterön was an island until 1936, when the sound between Getterön and the mainland was filled out and a road was built.

== Etymology ==
Coat of arms of Varberg Municipality.

The name Getterön is very old. It is derived from the Viking Age or even earlier. The spelling has varied, for example Gederöen or Gäderöen in 1645, Geterholmen in 1691, Getter ön in 1733, Geterön 1734 and Gietterön in 1752. The current spelling Getterön was not widely recognized until the 1900s, but appears in documents as early as in the 18th century and used in the public land registry in 1825.

The name's meaning is unclear. Probably there is an etymological link with the nearby Getakärr, a medieval city that was a predecessor of Varberg. Possibly there is a link to the noun goat. In Norwegian, the word Geite, which means "goat", is sometimes used in names of rivers and skerries. The coat of arms of Varberg Municipality, whose design is taken from a seal from 1536, includes a goat.

== Geology ==
The eastern parts of Getterön is geologically the oldest. The bedrock consists of granulite. The rock is between 1.6 and 1.7 billion years old.

In the western part of Getterön, the bedrock consists of charnockite, formed from magma pushed up from the Earth's crust and then solidified. It is around 1.45 billion years old. Mainly, western Getterön consists of two different types of charnockite: Varberg charnockite and Apelviken-Getterön charnockite. At Getterön, the charnockite has slightly larger crystals.

== Nature reserves ==
There are two nature reserves at Getterön. The older and most famous of them, Getterön Nature Reserve, is one of the finest bird sanctuaries in Sweden and a Ramsar wetland of international importance. It was founded in 1970.

The other nature reserve, Western Getterön Nature Reserve, was founded in 1974.
