= Crewe Gresty Bridge TMD =

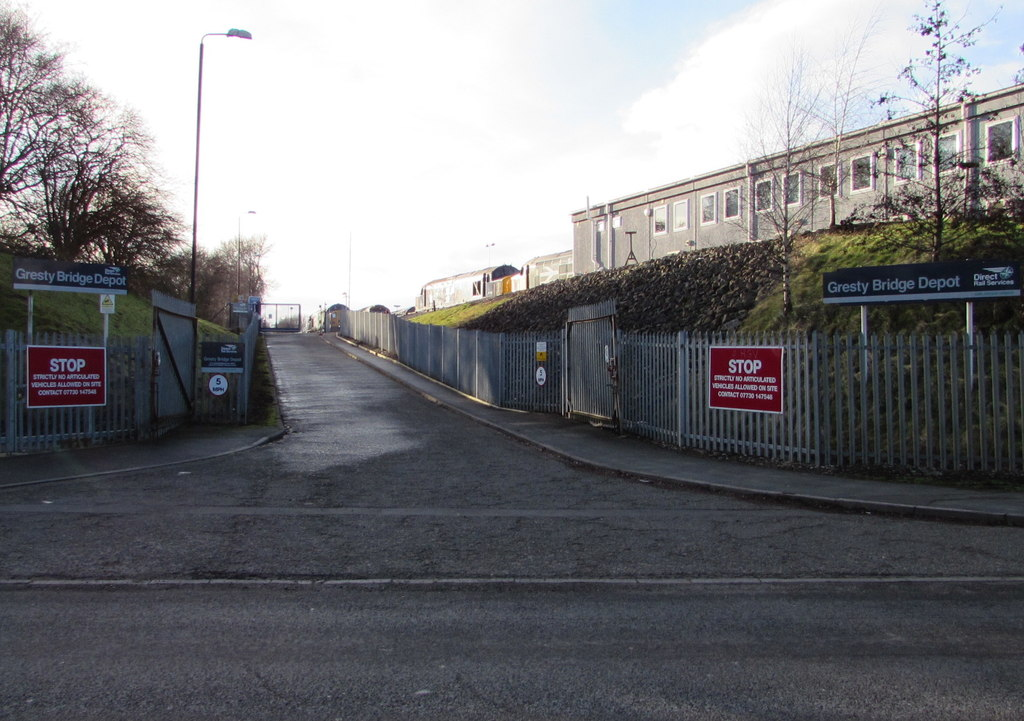
- The entrance to Crewe Gresty Bridge TMD.
- Interactive map of Crewe Gresty Bridge TMD

Location
- Location: Crewe, Cheshire
- Coordinates: 53.0794°N 2.4357°W
- OS grid: SJ708537

Characteristics
- Owner: DRS
- Depot code: CG (2007-)
- Type: Diesel & Bi-mode

Crewe Gresty Bridge TMD (formally, Crewe Gresty Lane TMD) is a Traction maintenance depot in Crewe, Cheshire, England. The depot is located to the South of Crewe station on the start of the line to Shrewsbury, over the road from the entrance to Crewe Basford Hall.

== History ==
The site was originally used by the Great Western Railway, and opened c. 1905 as a wagon works. The area of Gresty Lane sidings saw heavy use as wagon siding and a goods siding alongside its role as a wagon works.

In 1908 a young worker from the L&NWR was killed in a shunting incident in the sidings surrounding the Gresty Lane site.

From c.1945 - 1960s, Gresty Lane saw some minimal use by steam engines alongside its wagon-works before BR's withdrawal of steam where Gresty Lane then went back to being a wagon storage and maintenance facility.

Gresty Lane stayed as a wagon storage and maintenance facility until BR left the site and it was earmarked for redevelopment. This was until the land was sold and redeveloped in c. 2005 before the present depot was opened by Direct Rail Services (DRS) in 2007 under the name Crewe Gresty Bridge TMD.

DRS have operated numerous types of locomotives at Gresty Bridge since the site was opened in 2007. Most notably their class 20/3's & 37's. Both of which are now withdrawn by the operator.

For more information on DRS' fleet see: Direct Rail Services.

== Present ==
The depot continues to be used by DRS almost 18 years after it opened and is still in use by DRS' fleet of locomotives, which currently include, classes 57, 66, 68 & 88. The depot also occasionally sees wagons stabled alongside the locomotives, most commonly ZZA Snowploughs which are occasionally used by DRS in the winter months.

The class 57s are currently being disposed of by DRS and are being transferred to other operators, namely, GBRf.

== Open Days ==
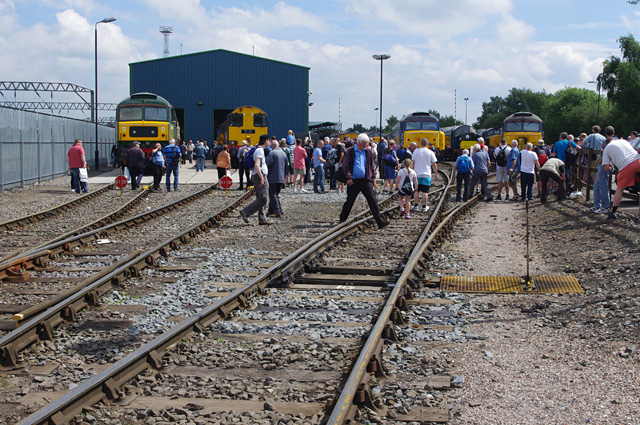
2018 Crewe Gresty Bridge Open Day.

DRS has held various 'Open Days' at the Gresty Bridge site. These allow enthusiasts to enter the site which had a large array of DRS and visiting locomotives on display along with unrestricted access inside of the main sheds.

DRS holds bi-annual depot open days, on a rotation between Carlisle Kingmoor TMD and Crewe every two years. The first Open Day was held in 2008, with the last at Crewe taking place in 2022. The next event is set out for July 2026. They are organised by DRS as a both an event for the public and a charity fundraiser, with the open day in 2022 raising over £40,000.
