= Beacon Rail =

British rolling stock company

- Predecessor: Allco Finance Group
- Founded: January 2009
- Founder: Mitsubishi UFJ Financial Group
- Headquarters: London, England
- Area served: Europe; United Kingdom
- Products: Rolling stock leasing
- Owner: JPMorgan Chase
- Website: www.beaconrail.com

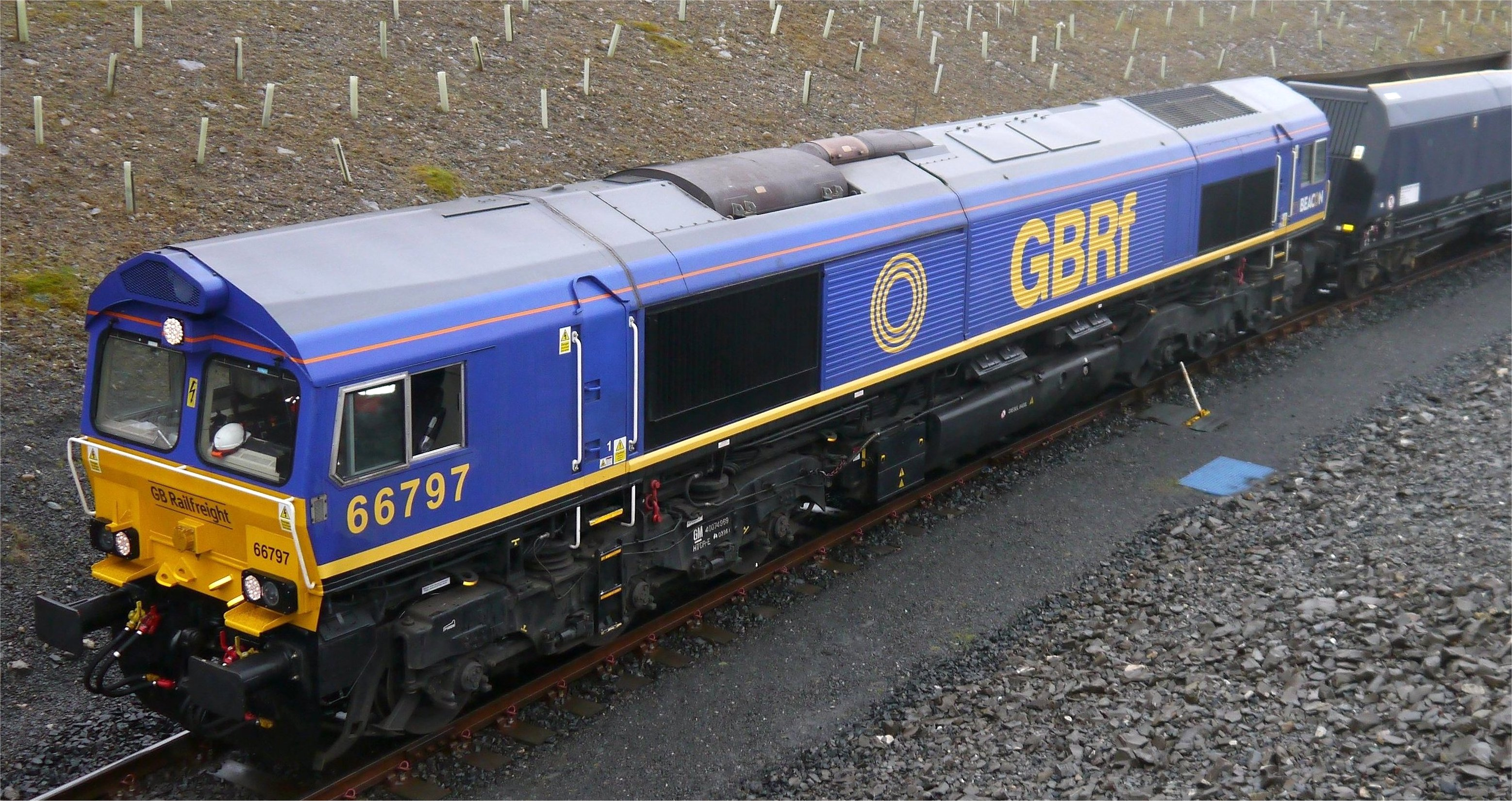
GBRf Class 66 in Beacon Rail livery, working at Arcow Quarry siding

Beacon Rail is a rolling stock company (ROSCO) based in the United Kingdom. Its primary business is the leasing of locomotives and rolling stock to various train operating companies (TOCs).

The company originated within Allco Finance Group's European rolling stock leasing business, which was acquired by the Japanese firm Mitsubishi UFJ Financial Group and rebranded as Beacon Rail shortly thereafter. Initially operating a relatively small fleet, it quickly moved to acquire new rail vehicles, such as the Class 68 and the Class 88, along with the buying out of competing firms such as HSBC Rail and Ascendos Rail Leasing. In 2017, Beacon Rail was purchased by the multinational investment group JPMorgan Chase; at this point, the company had almost 200 locomotives in its inventory. Rolling stock deals with other companies have continued, such as with Colas Rail, Stadler Rail, and the Clayton Equipment Company and CAF.

In January 2026, Beacon acquired Eversholt Rail, formerly one of the big three ROSCOs in the UK.

== History ==
In May 2008, Japan's Mitsubishi UFJ Financial Group purchased the European rolling stock leasing business of the Australian services entity Allco Finance Group. In January 2009, the entity was rebranded as Beacon Rail. Its initial fleet comprised 15 Class 66 locomotives (which were typically leased to Fastline and Freightliner), 12 Bombardier Traxx locomotives, and 15 coal wagons.

During early 2009, in coordination with the British train operating company Direct Rail Services (DRS), Beacon Rail approached the Swiss manufacturer Stadler Rail to explore the construction of a bespoke locomotive to meet DRS's needs. The locomotive, which was based upon its existing Eurolight platform, became the Class 68. From 2014, across multiple batches, a total of 32 locomotives would be delivered for mixed traffic operations, largely with DRS, or sub-leased by DRS to other operators. Beacon Rail also acquired ten Class 88 electro-diesel locomotives for DRS, which had a high degree of commonality with the preceding Class 68 (70 per cent of all components are shared).

In 2009, Beacon Rail purchased HSBC Rail's European business along with its 20 EMD JT42CWR locomotives. In 2012, it purchased its first passenger stock via a deal for 20 Class 313s that it leased to Southern, these multiple units had been acquired from Eversholt Rail Group. In 2014, Mitsubishi sold Beacon Rail to Pamplona Capital Management. In 2016, Ascendos Rail Leasing was purchased.

The firm also expanded its inventory of carriages; by 2016, 67 double-deck coaches were in operation in Denmark. That same year, Beacon Rail, in coordination with TransPennine Express (TPE) and Construcciones y Auxiliar de Ferrocarriles (CAF), announced plans to acquire 66 Mark 5A coaches for TPE's services, to be hauled by Beacon-owned Class 68 locomotives leased from DRS.

In 2017, Beacon Rail was purchased by the multinational investment group JPMorgan Chase. At the time of its acquisition, the company's portfolio had grown to include 190 locomotives, 944 freight wagons and 20 passenger trains. Shortly after, 352 Class 220 and 221 diesel multiple units were purchased from subsidiaries of Lloyds Bank and Royal Bank of Scotland. In 2018, 67 locomotives were purchased from Colas Rail. In July 2020, the company launched its new branding, trading simply as Beacon.

In 2021, it was announced that Beacon Rail would purchase 15 CBD90 battery locos from the Clayton Equipment Company. During April 2022, GB Railfreight and Stadler announced that an order for 30 Class 99 bi-mode heavy freight locomotives had been placed with the latter.

In February 2023 Beacon Rail finalised the purchase via auction of 12 BB27300 series locomotives from the SNCF Transilien fleet.
