= British Rail Class 68 =

British diesel-electric locomotive

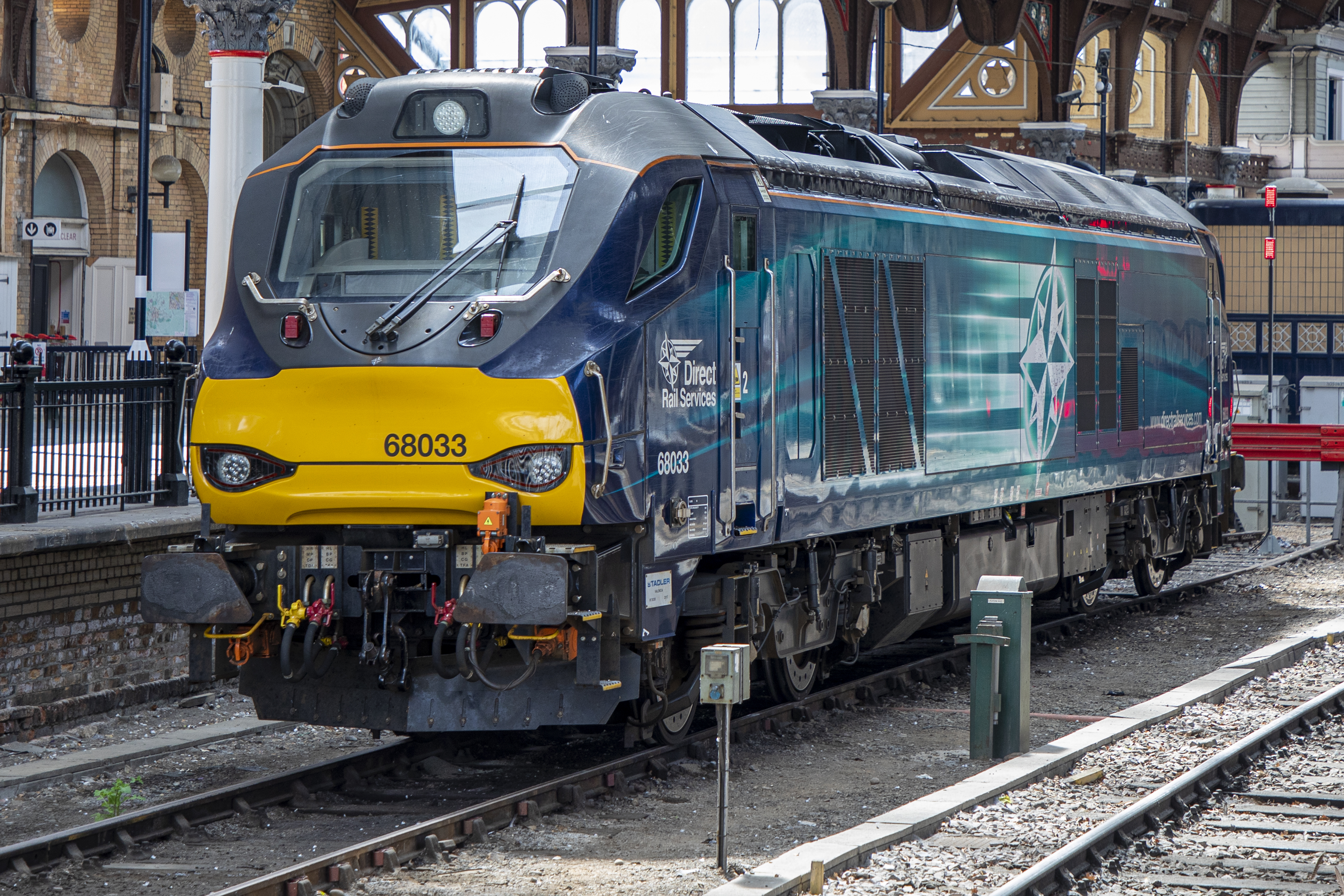
- DRS Class 68 locomotive at York
Type and origin
- Power type: Diesel-electric
- Builder: Vossloh España (2013–2015); Stadler Rail Valencia (2016–2017)
- Model: Stadler UKLight
- Build date: 2013–2017
- Total produced: 34
Specifications
- Configuration
  - UIC: Bo′Bo′
  - Commonwealth: Bo-Bo
- Gauge: 1,435 mm (4 ft 8 1/2 in) standard gauge
- Wheel diameter: 1,100 mm (3 ft 7 1/3 in)
- Loco weight: approximately 85 t (84 long tons; 94 short tons)
- Fuel type: diesel
- Fuel capacity: 5,000 L (1,100 imp gal; 1,300 US gal)
- Prime mover: Caterpillar C175-16
- Traction motors: Four ABB 4FRA6063 (600 kW)
- MU working: Within class and with Class 88.; 68008-68015: AAR system (Classes 59, 66, 67, 69, 70, and 73/9)
- Train heating: Electric, HEP inverter up to 500 kW (ETH index 96)
- Loco brake: Blended: Rheostatic braking (2,100 kW); electropneumatic.
- Safety systems: TPWS, AWS
Performance figures
- Maximum speed: 100 mph (160 km/h)
- Power output: 3,800 hp (2,800 kW) at 1,740 rpm
- Tractive effort: 317 kN (71,000 lbf)
Career
- Operators: Direct Rail Services; Chiltern Railways; TransPennine Express; Abellio ScotRail
- Numbers: 68001–68034
- Official name: UKLight
- Axle load class: RA 7
- Delivered: 2014
- First run: 2014
- Current owner: Beacon Rail; Direct Rail Services
- Sources: Technical parameters. (except where noted)

The Class 68 is a type of mainline mixed traffic diesel-electric locomotive manufactured by Stadler Rail Valencia (and previously by Vossloh España) for Direct Rail Services (DRS) in the United Kingdom. The design is derived from the Stadler Eurolight, and Stadler's product name for this variant is the UKLight.

On 5 January 2012, DRS announced the placement of an order for fifteen Class 68 locomotives, the first of which arrived in the UK during January 2014. The first batch of Class 68s was quickly followed by a second batch, also intended for DRS and the first batch to be built by Stadler. The delivery of these locomotives was completed during April 2016. A third batch of Class 68s was also ordered, deliveries of which were completed during July 2017. The Class 68 has since been followed by two related locomotives, the Class 88 and Class 93.

Since its introduction in 2014, the Class 68 has been used on numerous passenger and freight operations, including DRS's nuclear flask trains. In addition to DRS's freight operations, the operator has also used the type to haul various charter trains. Several units have been subleased to other operators, including Chiltern Railways, Abellio ScotRail, and TransPennine Express, for passenger services, hauling various rakes of carriages to do so, in some cases being outfitted with Association of American Railroads (AAR) push-pull apparatus.

== Background ==
=== Origins ===
During the 2000s, the British train operating company Direct Rail Services (DRS) recognised that its small fleet of British Rail Class 20 diesel locomotives were increasingly outdated and suffering from ever-decreasing viability as a result of the very low numbers still in service with any operator. Accordingly, management examined several alternatives that could potentially be operated with greater profitability while also being practical for the company's core business of transporting nuclear materials by rail. While DRS did acquire newer diesel traction, such as the ubiquitous British Rail Class 66 locomotive, these did not satisfactorily fill the Class 20's niche, partly due to Class 66's two-stroke engine being somewhat inefficient compared with some alternatives and unable to satisfy the latest EU emission standards. It also incurs a higher operating cost than several contemporary locomotives, along with a relatively high rate of wheelset wear and a less than hospitable cab environment. Thus, there were doubts over the suitability of the Class 66s for hauling nuclear waste trains.

In light of these factors, by 2009, DRS were convinced that a clean-sheet approach would be needed for its technical requirements, with management intended to not only support the business' core activities but without any subsidy but also increase its locomotive fleet. One stated requirement for the envisioned locomotive would be to satisfy the bulk of DRS's traction needs through to 2036. Various manufacturers and their platforms were examined, including Brush Traction, General Electric, Bombardier, Siemens, with particular attention paid to the British Rail Class 70. However, the relatively small quantity sought by DRS proved to be an adverse condition during this search. The rolling stock leasing company Beacon Rail suggested approaching the Spanish manufacturer Stadler Rail Valencia, which was relatively receptive of the construction of a bespoke locomotive to meet DRS's needs based upon its existing Eurolight platform.

To explore the concept in detail, Stadler produced a modified EUROLight demonstrator that conformed with the relatively restricted dimensions imposed by the British loading gauge as well as the specification produced by DRS, and subjected it to tests at the Velim railway test circuit in the Czech Republic. Areas of modification extended beyond the physical bodyshell and the mechanical systems, as British railway regulations necessitated wiring changes and the fitted equipment. Furthermore, whereas the EUROLight platform had been geared for a maximum speed of 75 mph (121 km/h), DRS sought a top speed of 100 mph (160 km/h); as a part of the modifications made to achieve this, the axle-hung traction motors had to be relocated to the body to produce a reduction in the locomotive's overall unsprung mass. The development effort, which took roughly 18 months from start to finish, was greatly aided by the firm's experience from prior work undertaken in the manufacture of the British Rail Class 67 locomotive. Stadler's performance and responsiveness to DRS' interest led to the latter placing its confidence in the former.

As a result of another DRS stipulation, an electric train supply was incorporated into the UKLight's power train, capable of supplying up to 500 kW (670 hp) so that large trains, such as a British Rail Class 390, could be readily hauled. The locomotive's propulsion system is compliant with Stage III A of the European emission standards, but not the more stringent Stage III B requirements. While DRS had envisioned their ideal locomotive using a Co-Co wheel arrangement, the performance demonstrated by the EUROLight demonstrator at Velim was such to convince the company that the requirement could be satisfactorily fulfilled using a four-axle traction unit. This is partially a consequence of its relatively low centre of gravity and its balanced and evenly spread weight, which to minimise weight transfer between the axles when pulling heavy trains and helps ensure a consistent delivery of the maximum tractive effort.

=== Order and production ===
On 5 January 2012, DRS announced it had placed an order with Vossloh for fifteen 100 mph (160 km/h) Eurolight locomotives for both intermodal and passenger work; these would be leased from Beacon Rail and the first example to be delivered during late 2013. The value of the contract has been estimated at £45 million. During February 2013, it was announced that the locomotives were to be known as the Class 68 under TOPS; while Vossloh and later Stadler refer to the design by its product name of UKLight.

Placement of this first order to delivery of the first Class 68 locomotive took 28 months. The UKLight's detailed design had not been finalised at the time of the order; according to rail industry periodical Rail, it took four months to select the power train. The selected powerplant was a single 16-cylinder 3,800 hp (2.8 MW) C175-16 engine supplied by Caterpillar Inc.; this was paired with an ABB-built traction package incorporating a six-pole brushless synchronous alternator and two ABB Bordline CC1500 DE compact converters, which use rectifiers to generate an intermediate DC supply, braking chopper, and to power onboard electronics. The Class 68 incorporates an identical vehicle control unit and driver's advisory system to those fitted on the standard EUROLight platform. It has proved to be compliant with DRS's relatively stringent adhesion demands, and that it can achieve a maximum tractive effort of 317 kN.

The first locomotive, 68001, underwent several months of testing at Velim Test Centre in the Czech Republic prior to being shipped to the UK. Thus, during January 2014, the second locomotive in the class, 68002, was the first to arrive in the UK.

An option for ten further locomotives was confirmed to have been taken up in September 2014. Further to this, on 28 July 2015, Vossloh España announced an order for a further seven locomotives from DRS.

== Current operations ==
=== Direct Rail Services ===
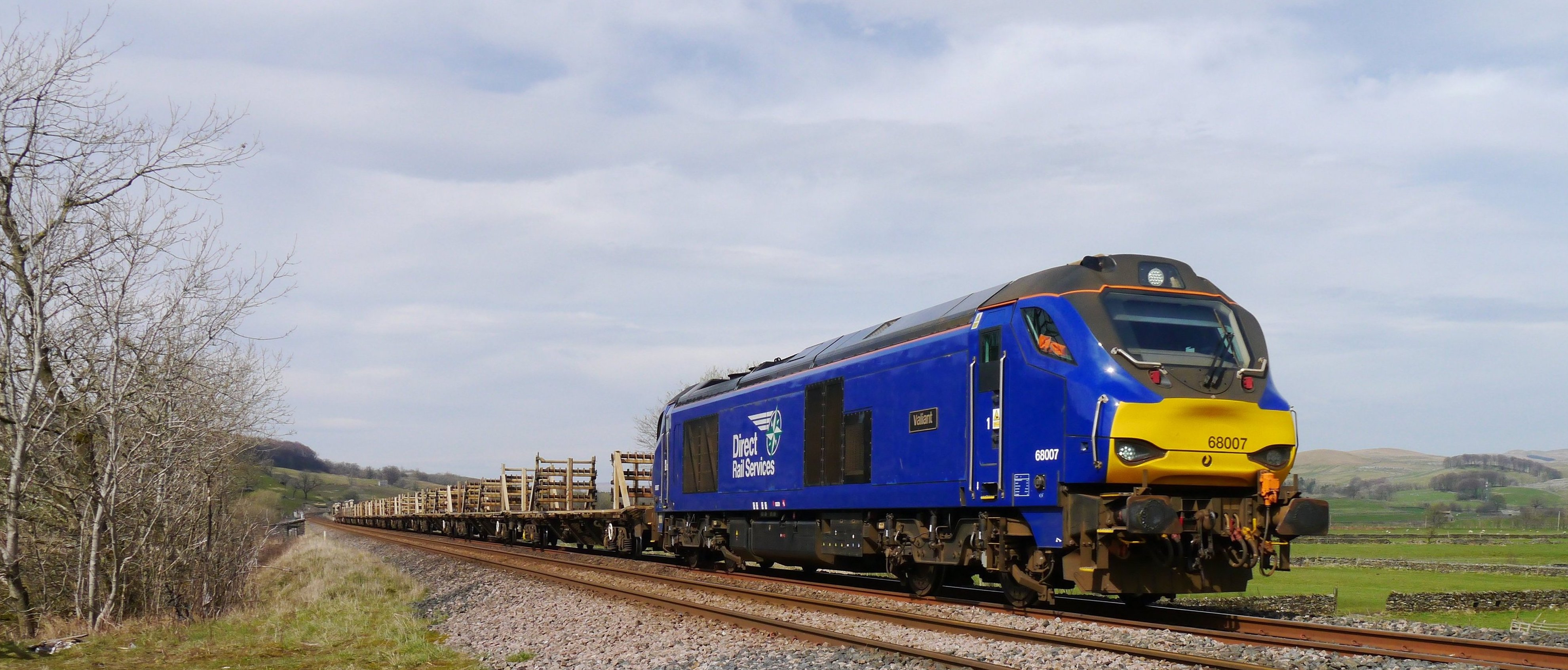
DRS Class 68 approaching the River Ribble

The Class 68 is a mixed-traffic locomotive intended for use on both passenger and freight trains. Customer trials of the type commenced during February 2014, which were initially conducted between Carlisle and Crewe. During mid-2014, DRS indicated that the type were typically operated on container traffic, as well as on Network Rail trains for which the company has been contracted to operate.

The first passenger trains hauled by Class 68s were DRS special services for the 2014 Ryder Cup at Gleneagles. Furthermore, the type is routinely used on DRS nuclear flask trains. According to Rail, operations of the Class 68 have proved it to be highly effective.

=== Chiltern Railways ===
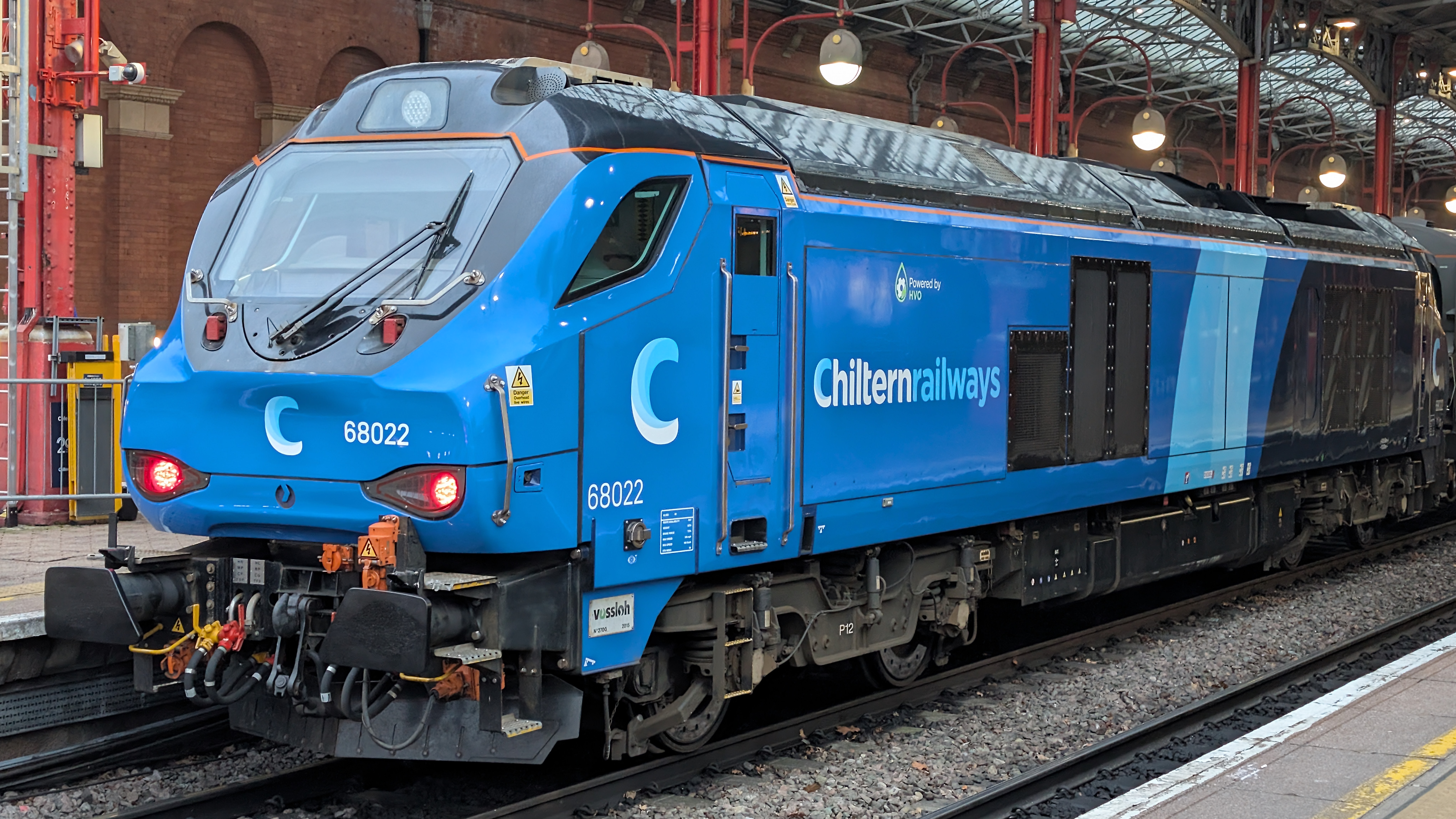
Refurbished Chiltern Railways Class 68 at London Marylebone

From December 2014, the train operating company Chiltern Railways has sub-leased six Class 68 locomotives (68010 to 68015) from DRS; the type has entirely replaced the older Class 67 locomotives on Chiltern Main Line services between London Marylebone and Birmingham Snow Hill.

These locomotives have been painted in Chiltern's silver Mainline livery and are fitted with Association of American Railroads (AAR) push-pull equipment, which allows them to operate with Mark 3 coaching stock sets. Furthermore, two DRS-liveried locomotives (68008 and 68009) have also been fitted with AAR push-pull equipment.

In August 2025, Chiltern announced that they would be returning their Class 68 locomotives (68010 to 68015) to DRS, and withdrawing the Mark 3 coaching stock. They will be replaced with different Class 68 locomotives (68019 to 68032) previously leased by TransPennine Express, along with their compatible Mark 5A coaches. These trains will be fitted with automatic start-stop technology to reduce amounts of noise and pollution made by the locomotives. The first of the new trains entered service on 26 January 2026.

== Former operations ==
=== Abellio ScotRail ===
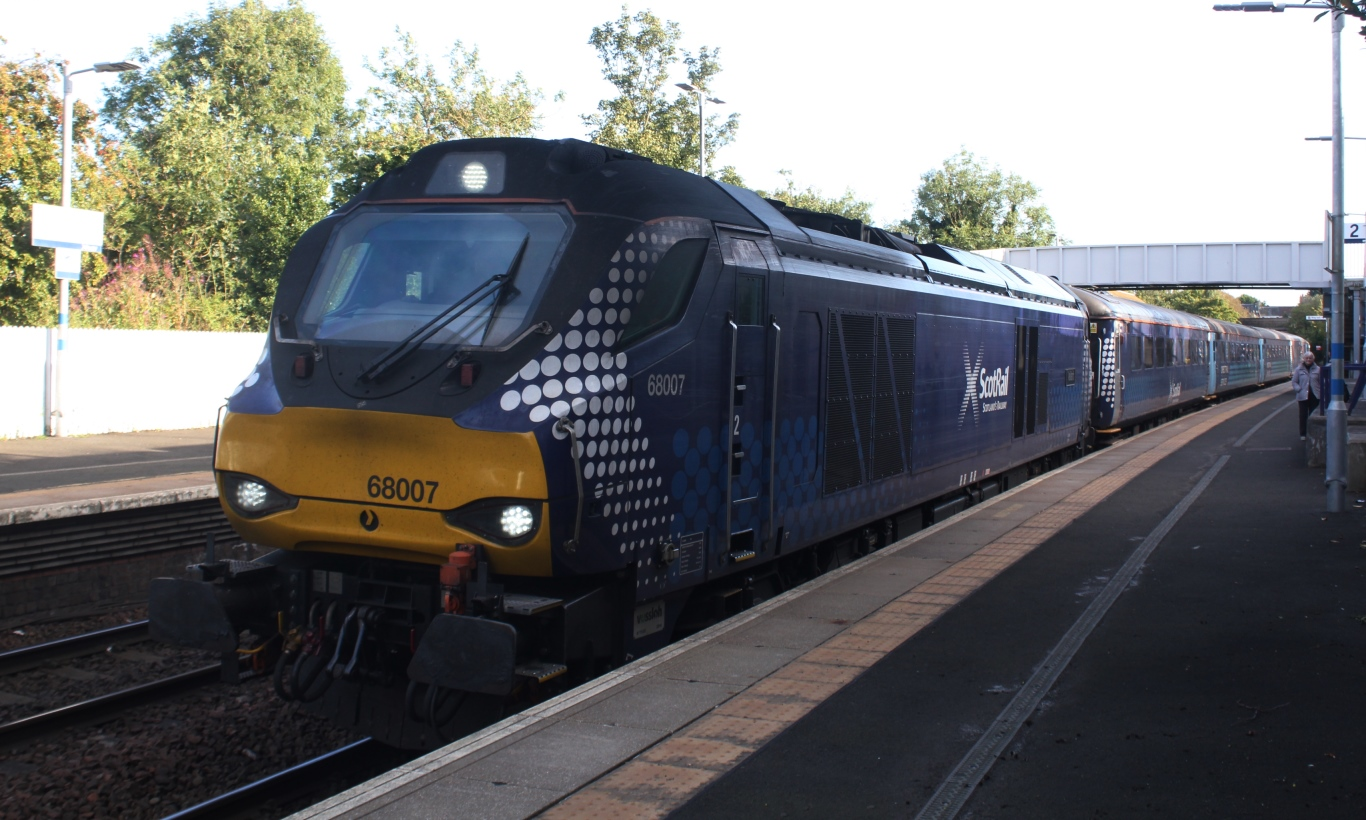
Class 68 on the Glenrothes service

Abellio ScotRail sub-leased two Class 68s, to haul sets of six Mark 2 coaches, for use on peak hour services on the Fife Circle Line. These were 68006 and 68007, which carried the Saltire livery. These services commenced on 1 April 2015, the first day of Abellio Scotrail operation, with the last service operating on 29 May 2020 as the PRM-TSI derogations for the non-compliant Mark 2 coaches ended on 31 May of that year.

=== TransPennine Express ===
TransPennine Express (TPE) sub-leased fourteen Class 68 locomotives (68019 to 68032) from DRS, for initial use on the Liverpool Lime Street to Scarborough route. Once more sets were delivered and staff had been trained they also worked Manchester Airport to Redcar Central services. These hauled five-car rakes of Mark 5A coaches, with a driving trailer at the opposite end.

The former TPE-vinyled locomotives do not feature yellow front ends, following a change to the regulations.

In August 2023, TransPennine Express announced plans to withdraw its Class 68 fleet, as well as its Mark 5A coaches, from the December 2023 timetable change; however the sets were still leased by TPE until May 2024, and remained in storage until 2026 when the 13 Mark 5A compatible Class 68s moved to Chiltern Railways, as well as the Mark 5A coaches.

== Fleet ==
Before delivery, each of the first nine locomotives was named. All of the other Class 68 locomotives (except 68011 and 68014) have also been named. Locomotive 68010 was named Oxford Flyer on 12 December 2016, in celebration of Chiltern Railways new London-Oxford services. Locomotive 68033 was named The Poppy in honour of the 100th anniversary of the Royal British Legion on 30 October 2021, in a ceremony at London Euston. Locomotive 68006 was renamed Pride of the North as a tribute to the work that DRS do in Northern England and Scotland.

Class	Operator	Sub-leased to	Number Built	Year built
Class 68	Direct Rail Services	Chiltern Railways	14	2013–2017

=== Named locomotives ===
The names given to Class 68 locomotives are as follows:

Number	Name	Operator	Notes
68001	Evolution	Direct Rail Services	
68002	Intrepid	Direct Rail Services	
68003	Astute	Direct Rail Services	
68004	Rapid	Direct Rail Services	
68005	Defiant	Direct Rail Services	
68006	Pride Of The North	Direct Rail Services	Formerly Daring. Ex-ScotRail
68007	30 Years of DRS	Direct Rail Services	Formerly Valiant. Ex-ScotRail. Named to celebrate 30 years of Direct Rail Services
68008	Avenger	Direct Rail Services	
68009	Titan	Direct Rail Services	
68010	Oxford Flyer	Direct Rail Services	Ex-Chiltern Railways
68011		Direct Rail Services	Ex-Chiltern Railways
68012	Amy Owen	Direct Rail Services	Ex-Chiltern Railways
68013	Peter Wreford-Bush	Direct Rail Services	Ex-Chiltern Railways
68014		Direct Rail Services	Ex-Chiltern Railways
68015	Kev Helmer	Direct Rail Services	Ex-Chiltern Railways
68016	Fearless	Direct Rail Services	
68017	Hornet	Direct Rail Services	
68018	Vigilant	Direct Rail Services	
68019	Brutus (de-named)	Chiltern Railways	
68020	Reliance	Chiltern Railways	
68021	Tireless	Chiltern Railways	
68022	Resolution	Chiltern Railways	
68023	Achilles (de-named)	Chiltern Railways	
68024	Centaur (de-named)	Chiltern Railways	
68025	Superb (de-named)	Chiltern Railways	
68026	Enterprise (de-named)	Chiltern Railways	
68027	Splendid (de-named)	Chiltern Railways	
68028	Lord President (de-named)	Chiltern Railways	
68029	Courageous (de-named)	Chiltern Railways	
68030	Black Douglas (de-named)	Chiltern Railways	
68031	Felix (de-named)	Chiltern Railways	Was named after the former Huddersfield station cat
68032	Destroyer (de-named)	Chiltern Railways	
68033	The Poppy	Direct Rail Services	
68034	Rail Riders 2020	Direct Rail Services	

=== Liveries ===
Example Class 68 liveries
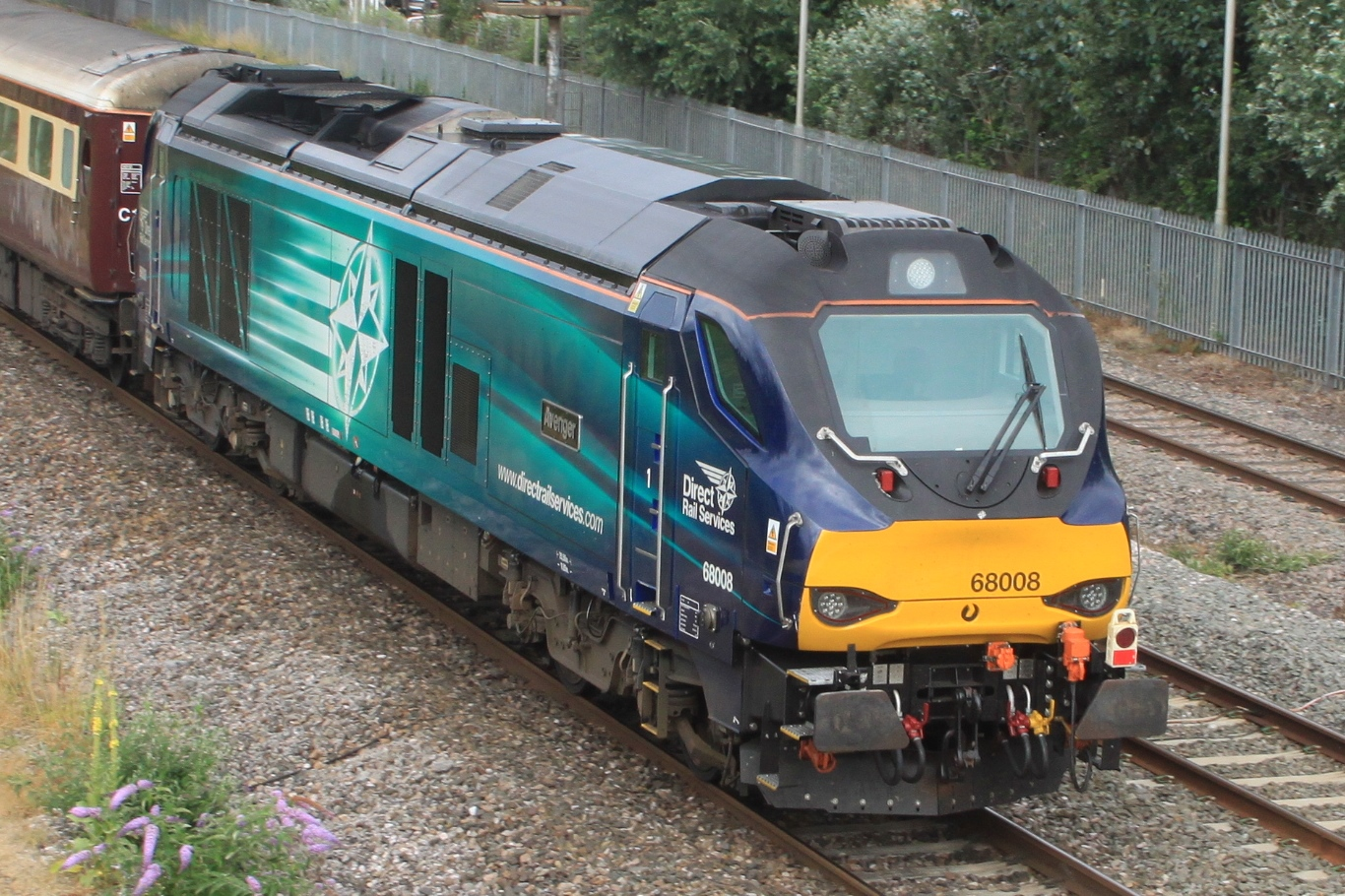
Direct Rail Services

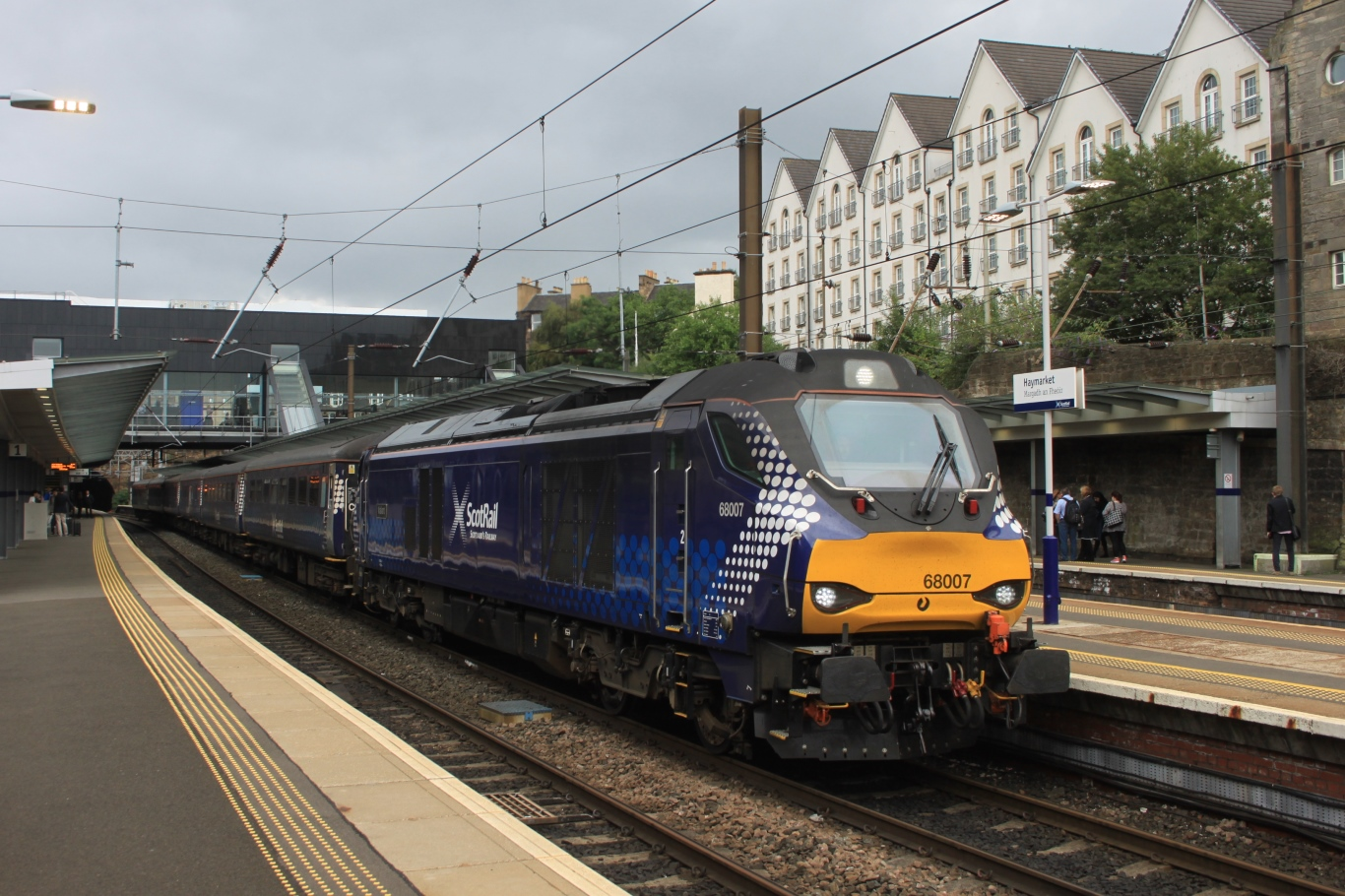
Abellio ScotRail

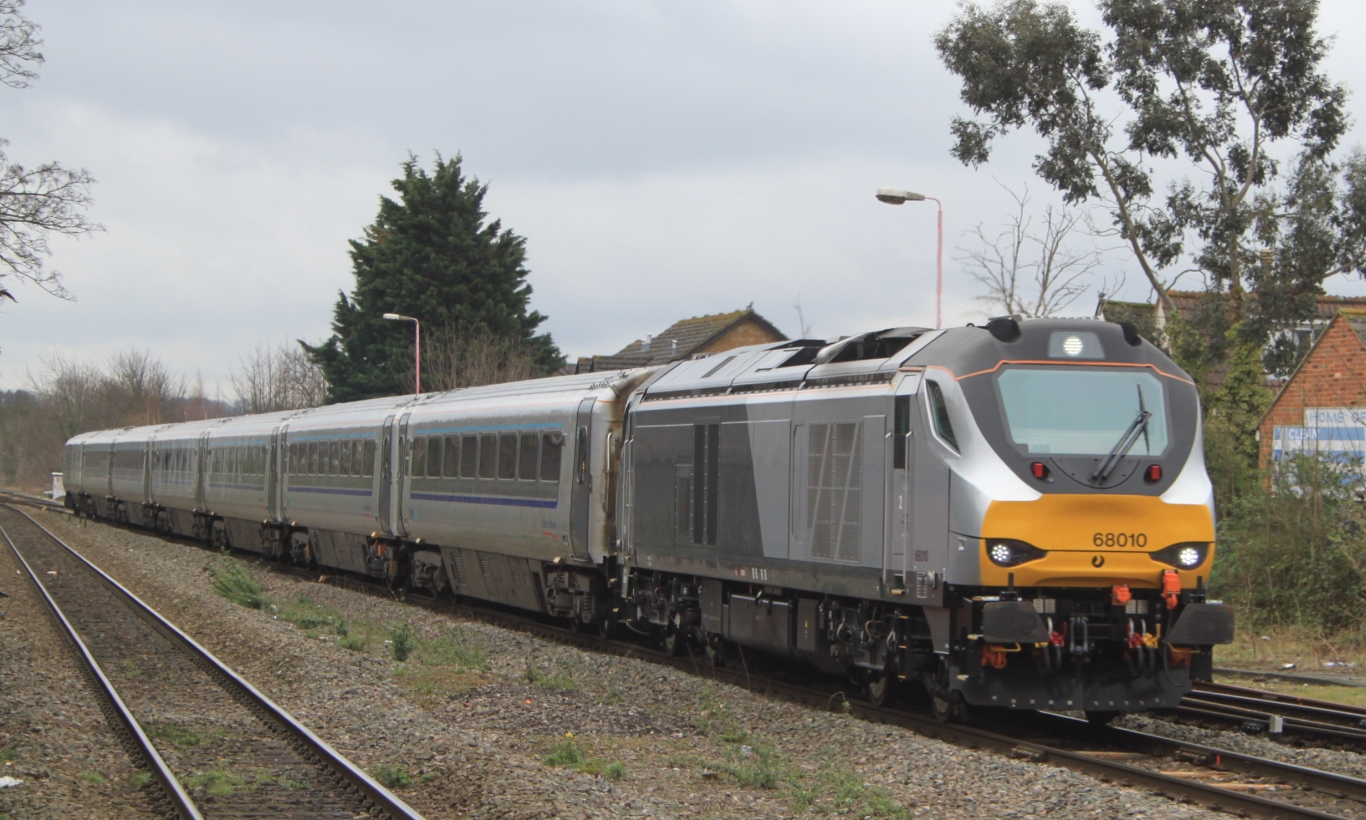
Chiltern Railways 2014–2026 livery

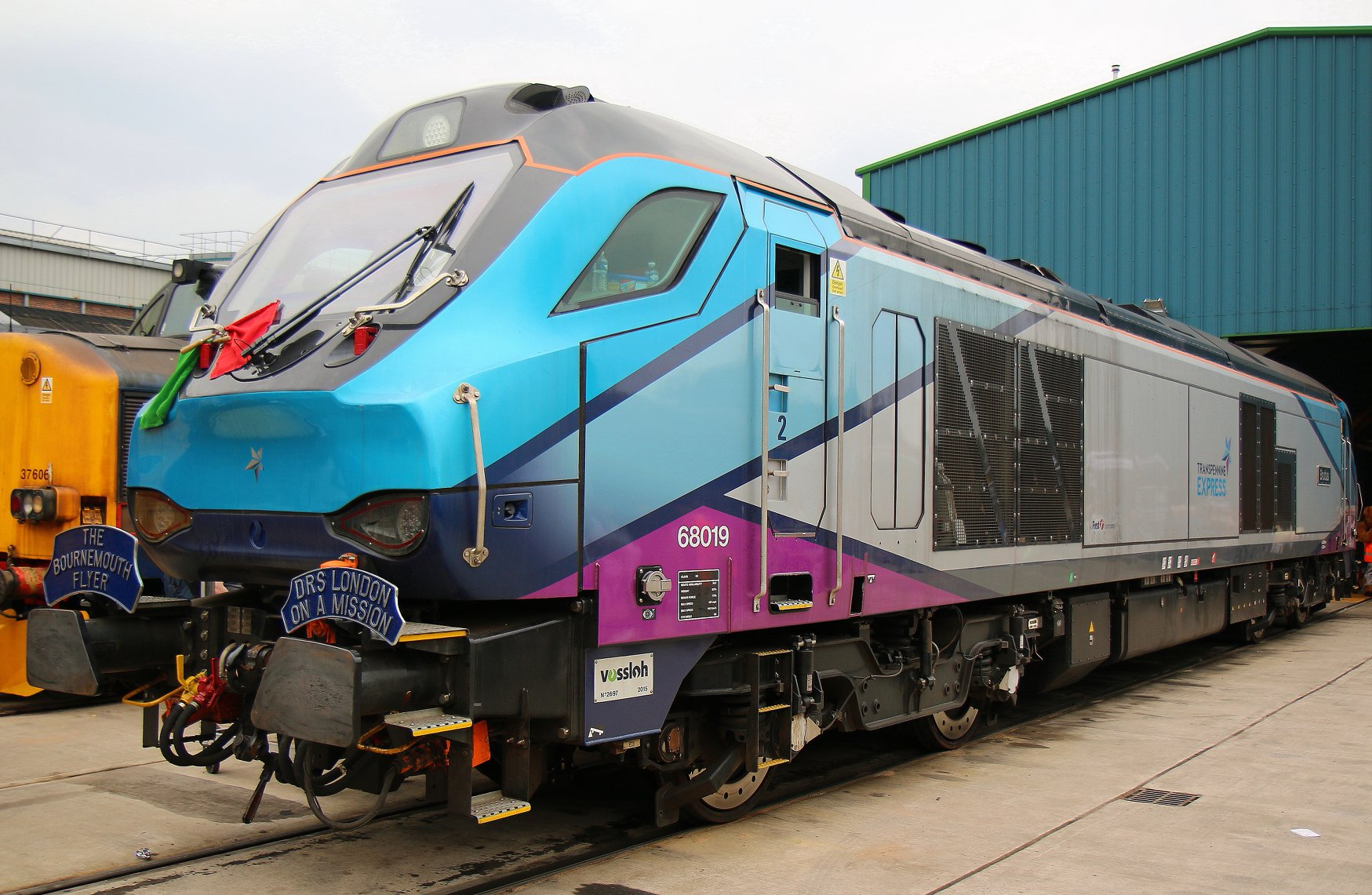
TransPennine Express

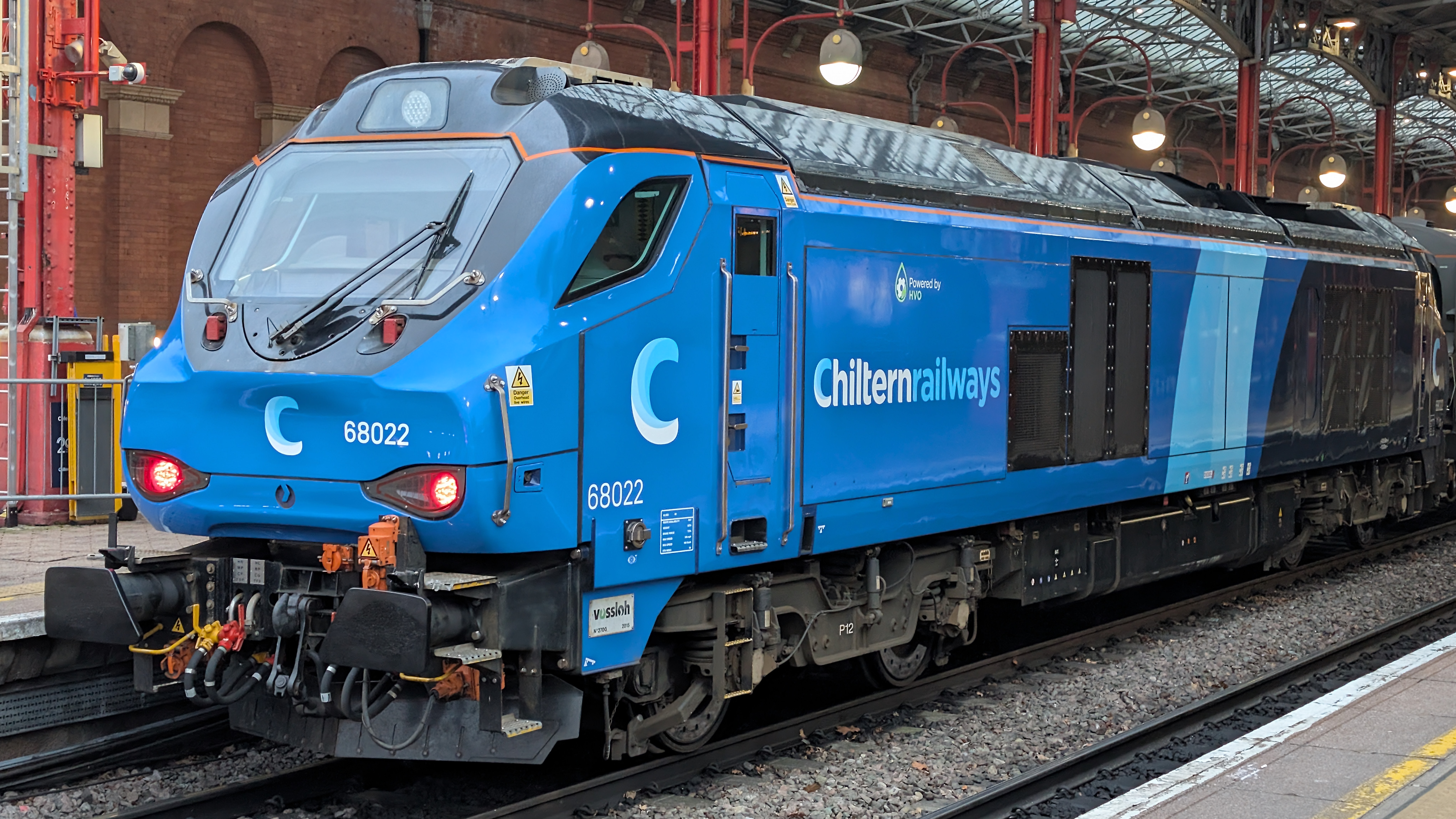
Chiltern Railways 2026–present

== See also ==
- Stadler Euro Dual, the electro-diesel variant based on the Class 68 ordered by DRS as the Class 88.
