= British Rail Class 93 =

British railway locomotive

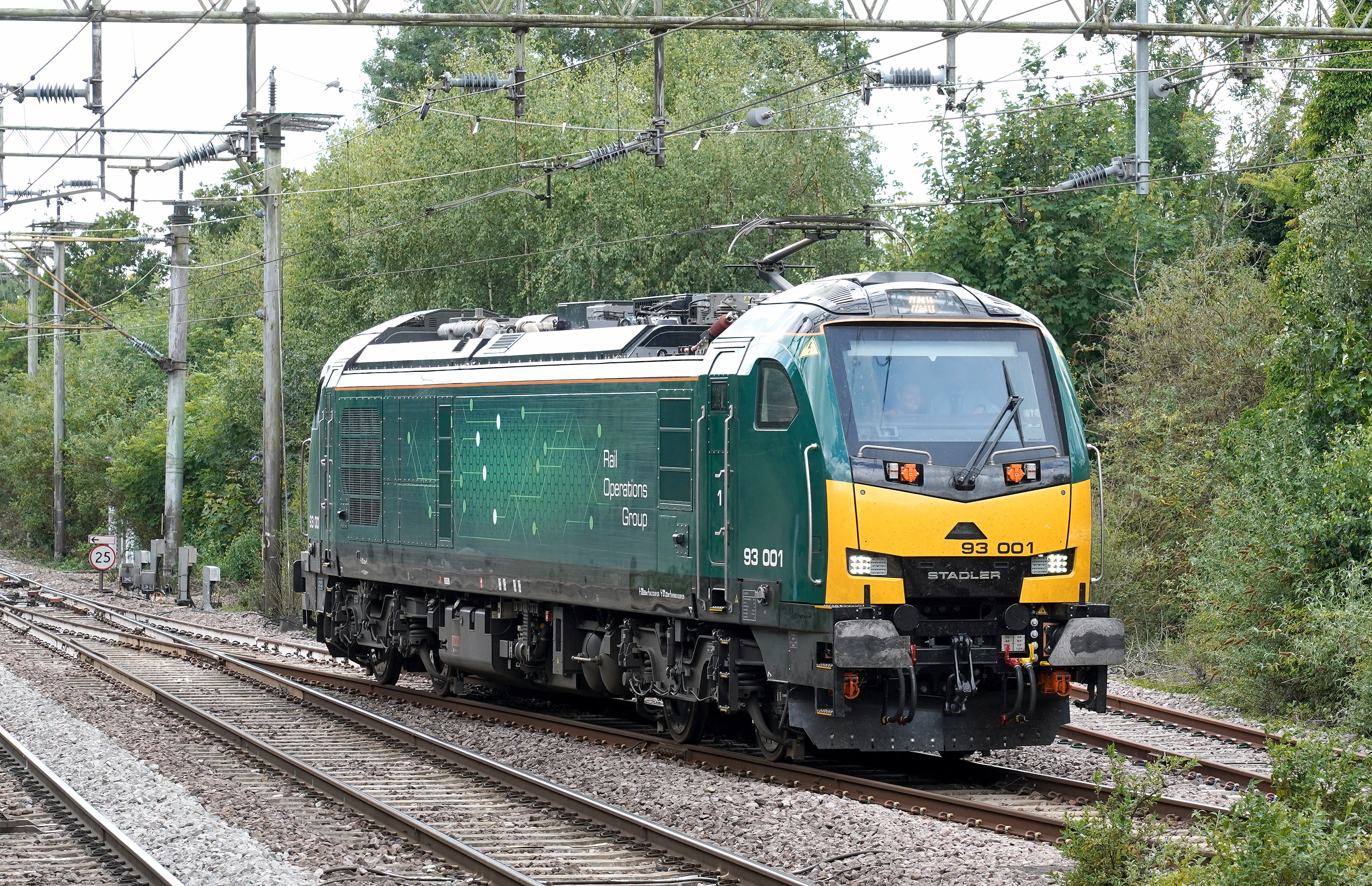
- A Rail Operations Group Class 93 on the Great Eastern Main Line
Type and origin
- Power type: Electro-diesel with battery
- Builder: Stadler Rail (Stadler Rail Valencia SAU)
- Model: Euro Light
- Build date: June 2022 – 2024
Specifications
- Configuration
  - UIC: Bo′Bo′
- Gauge: 4 ft 8 1/2 in (1,435 mm) standard gauge
- Loco weight: 86 tonnes (85 long tons; 95 short tons)
- Fuel type: Diesel
- Electric system/s: 25 kV 50 Hz AC overhead
- Current pickup: Pantograph
- Prime mover: Caterpillar C32
- Engine type: Four-stroke V12 diesel
- Aspiration: Twin-turbocharged
- Displacement: 32.1 L (1,959 cu in) total
- Transmission: Diesel-electric and Electric
- Loco brake: Air brake, Electric brake
- Train brakes: Air brake
- Safety systems: TPWS, AWS, ETCS
Performance figures
- Maximum speed: 110 mph (180 km/h)
- Power output: On AC electric supply: 4,600 kW (6,200 hp); Diesel engine: 900 kW (1,200 hp); Battery packs: 400 kW (540 hp)
- Tractive effort: 290 kN (At low speeds)
Career
- Operators: Rail Operations Group
- Numbers: 93001–93010
- Disposition: In service

The British Rail Class 93 is a tri-mode locomotive built by Stadler Rail in Valencia. It is an evolution of the Class 88 bi-mode locomotive, which was built by Stadler for Direct Rail Services. Three different power sources are used to power the locomotive – 4,000 kW (5,400 hp) 25 kV AC overhead electric power, or a 900 kW (1,200 hp) diesel engine supplemented by a 400 kW (540 hp) battery – allowing the locomotive to be used on both electrified and non-electrified lines.

Rail Operations Group is the sole operator and ordered ten locomotives.

== Development ==
=== Background ===
Since the phasing out of steam locomotives in the 1960s, the vast majority of Britain's freight trains have been powered by diesel locomotives. During the late 2010s, as part of wider efforts to pursue carbon neutral operations, the Department for Transport (DfT) stated its long term goal of eliminating diesel-only traction from Britain's railways by 2040, despite only 46.5% of all lines being electrified. However, due to a lack of government support for the rail freight sector, operators have traditionally faced difficulty in justifying sizeable capital investments such as new locomotives, thus many are between 25 and 50 years old as of 2020.

=== Rationale ===
Founded in 2015, Rail Operations Group (ROG) quickly took an interest in bi-mode propulsion technology as well as high-speed freight operations. The company observed that rival operators made heavy use of the Class 66, a locomotive introduced in the mid-1990s, and that this would be the base line to innovate against in the locomotive-hauled freight market. ROG opted to work in conjunction with locomotive manufacturer Stadler Rail to develop a tri-mode high powered locomotive concept, which has since been assigned the designation of Class 93. The concept was first proposed during 2018.

=== Development history ===
In January 2021, ROG confirmed its order of 30 Class 93 locomotives, with the first ten deliveries scheduled for 2023. Grand Union has proposed using Class 93s on its London Euston to Stirling services, but this was later scrapped in September 2024 after FirstGroup bought out the Grand Union franchise.

During mid-2022, production of the fleet had commenced at Stadler's plant in Valencia. On 1 July 2023, the first Class 93 was officially delivered to ROG; testing of the type was underway to support its future introduction to service.

By February 2024, ten units had been built, but the order for 20 more units was uncertain.

The locomotives had entered service on the 9 October 2025.

== Specification ==
The Class 93 locomotive is a derivative of the Class 88 electro-diesel and Class 68 diesel locomotives, both of which were built by Stadler. As with Class 88 locomotives, Class 93s are designed as fast freight locomotives that use electric power while under the wires, but that are also capable of self-powered operations. However, improving upon Class 88s – which when running in diesel mode produce a maximum of 710 kW (950 hp), and are thus mostly limited to 'last mile' operations – the Class 93 design includes both a 900 kW (1,200 hp) diesel engine and a 400 kW (540 hp) set of rechargeable battery packs. The diesel engine is a turbocharged 12-cylinder Caterpillar C32, which conforms with the EU's Stage V emissions standards.

The battery packs use lithium-titanium oxide chemistry and will have a liquid cooling solution, enabling rapid charge and discharge. The battery packs can be charged either from the overhead AC supply via the onboard transformer, by the diesel engine when the full output is not needed for traction, or by using power reclaimed during regenerative braking. As the battery packs are carried in the space used on Class 88 locomotives for the rheostatic brake resistor grids, Class 93s will not be equipped with rheostatic braking. Instead, they will use regenerative braking, when the batteries can accept charge, and/or friction braking.

The Class 93 will have a top speed of 110 mph (180 km/h), and have a maximum of 1,300 kW (1,700 hp) of usable power when running in "hybrid" diesel mode with battery boost. The batteries have a capacity of 80 kWh, sufficient for ten minutes of boost. They can also be used to supply standalone traction power.

== Proposed use ==
ROG intends to pair the locomotive with a new generation of freight wagons that would run at a maximum speed of 100 mph (160 km/h), comparable to that of contemporary passenger trains. Trains formed of such wagons would be easier to insert into timetables around and between existing passenger trains, increasing flexibility and potentially creating capacity for more freight trains on the national network. On 10 February 2026, DB Cargo trialled a Class 93 locomotive on an intermodal working from Seaforth to Mossend.

In addition to freight, the Class 93 has also been designed to accommodate the haulage of passenger stock, including a variable-height Dellner coupling and a three-step Westcode brake in addition to its conventional two-pipe air brake.

== Comparison with competing locomotives ==
In comparison with the Class 66, the Class 93 can outperform it in various metrics. The locomotive has a higher top speed and offers greater acceleration on electrified lines. It has far lower operating costs, consuming only a third of the fuel of a Class 66, along with lower track access charges due to its lower weight. ROG has postulated that it presents a superior business case, particularly for intermodal rail freight operations, while also being better suited for mixed-traffic operations as well. Each locomotive has a reported cost of £4 million.

== Models ==
In 2021, Revolution Trains announced it was in the early stages of developing a OO gauge model of the Class 93, using CAD data supplied by Stadler.

== See also ==
- Dual-mode locomotive
- British Rail Class 99 – a class of locomotive also based on the EuroDual platform
