= Genesis (given name) =

- Gender: Feminine

Origin
- Origin: English, Spanish
- Meaning: "beginning", a reference to the Book of Genesis

Genesis (or Génesis in Spanish) is a modern English and Spanish name taken from the word meaning "creation" or "beginning", or given in reference to the Book of Genesis.

== Popularity ==
Genesis has been a well-used name for girls in the United States, where it has ranked among the top 1,000 names given to newborn girls since 1988, among the top 200 names since 2000 and among the top 100 names given to newborn girls since 2008.

Genesis is a name that has been particularly popular for Hispanic girls. Genesis was among the five most popular names for Hispanic newborn girls in the American state of Virginia in 2022 and again in 2023. It was among the top names for newborn girls in Puerto Rico in 2010. The name has also ranked among the top 100 names for girls in Chile and Mexico in recent years.

== People ==
- Genesis Be, American recording artist, painter, and activist
- Génesis Carmona (1991–2014), Venezuelan fashion model, beauty queen, and college student killed while protesting the government of Venezuela
- Genesis Cornejo-Alvarado (died 2017), American teenage murder victim
- Génesis Dávila (born 1990), Puerto Rican American model and beauty pageant title holder
- Génesis Franchesco (born 1990), Venezuelan female volleyball player
- Genesis Lynea (born 1989), Bermudian-born British actress, dancer, and singer
- Génesis Reasco (born 1998), Ecuadoran freestyle wrestler
- Genesis Rodriguez (born 1987), American actress and model
- Génesis Rodríguez Gomez (born 1994), Venezuelan weightlifter
- Génesis Romero (born 1995), Venezuelan athlete specializing in the 100 meter hurdles and long jump

== See also ==
- Genesis Owusu (born 1998), stage name of Kofi Owusu-Ansah (born 1998), Ghanaian-born Australian singer
- Genesis P-Orridge (1950-2020), born Neil Megson, British-born singer-songwriter, musician, poet, performance artist, visual artist, and occultist
