= Northern Belle (train) =

UK luxury train

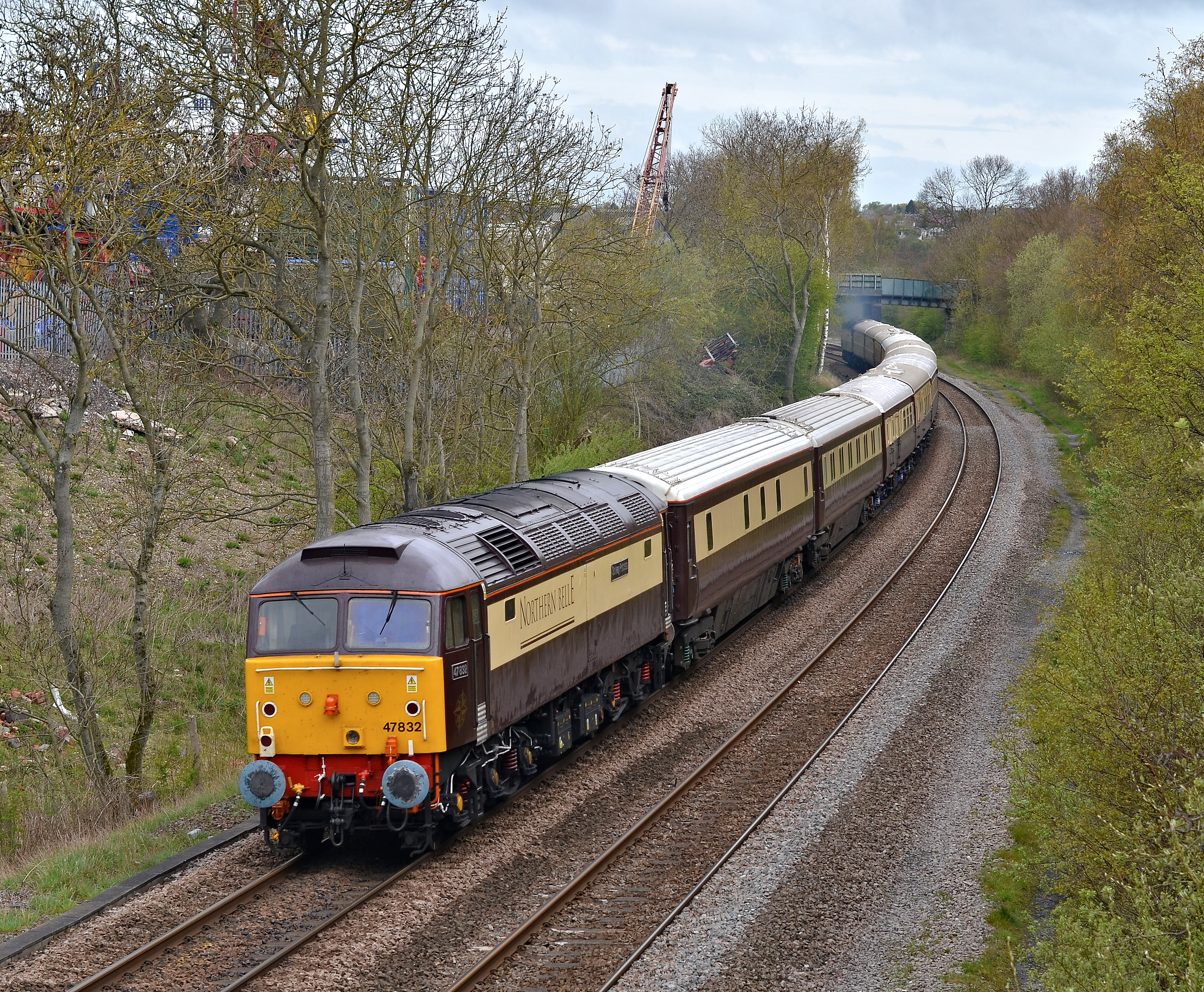
- The Northern Belle in April 2012 hauled by a Direct Rail Services Class 47
- Franchise: Railtour operator
- Fleet: 13 rail carriages
- Parent company: David Smith (50%); David Pitts (50%)

Other
- Website: www.northernbelle.co.uk

The Northern Belle is a luxury train that operates day and weekend journeys around Britain from many different departure points. The train is named to recall the Belle trains of the 1930s, such as the weekly Northern Belle land cruise; operated by the London and North Eastern Railway every June from 1933 to 1939.

It was launched on 31 May 2000 with a journey from Liverpool Lime Street to Grantham. The carriages had been restored by the Venice-Simplon Orient Express which became Belmond Limited in 2014.

== Services ==
Northern Belle visits places of interest throughout Britain such as castles, country houses, cities, sporting occasions and events including the Hampton Court Palace Flower Show and Royal Edinburgh Military Tattoo. There are also weekend journeys to destinations including Inverness, with overnight hotel accommodation, and non-stop round trips with dining on board.

Northern Belle operates mainly throughout northern Britain, with destinations ranging from Edinburgh, Cardiff, Cheltenham, Chester and Harrogate to as far south as London and Bristol.

== Carriages ==
The Northern Belle consists of 13 coaches: seven converted Mark 2 coaches as crew and dining carriages, two Mark 3 staff sleepers, two Mark 1 service and kitchen cars, a Mark 1 baggage car, and a Mark 1 Pullman parlour car Duart, which was added to the train in 2012. The carriages were re-engineered by LNWR at Crewe, in the style of Pullman coaches.

The dining car interiors are decorated with artwork, mosaics and wooden panels. Some of the marquetry was created by A Dunn and Son, a family firm that dates from 1895 and which created panels for carriages that ran on the historic Northern Belle services.

Image	Number	Name	Design	Type	Built	Notes
	3273	Alnwick	Mark 2e FO	Dining car	1974	Marquetry motif of Alnwick Castle, inlaid with oak, boxwood, yew, sycamore and walnut.
	10734	Balmoral	Mark 3a SLE	Staff sleeper	1984	Built as staff sleeper car for the Royal Train, coach number 2914. Named for the Royal residence of Balmoral Castle.
	3267	Belvoir	Mark 2e FO	Dining car	1974	Marquetry motif of honeybees and flowers inlaid with Indian rosewood, oak, pomelle, sycamore, madrona burr and walnut. Named for Belvoir Castle.
	1566	Caerdydd	Mark 1 RKB	Kitchen car	1961	Caerdydd is the Welsh name for Cardiff.
	3247	Chatsworth	Mark 2e FO	Dining car	1972	Marquetry motif of the façade of stately home Chatsworth House, inlaid with yew-tree burr, sycamore, walnut, maple and satinwood.
	10729	Crewe	Mark 3a SLE	Staff sleeper	1980	Crewe is an important railway town in Cheshire and used to be the base for the Northern Belle,
	325	Duart	Mark 1 Pullman	Dining car	1960	Marquetry motif of Duart Castle and pink heather, on walnut. Ceiling painted with mural of Scottish flora and fauna by artist Chris Shields.
	3174	Glamis	Mark 2d FO	Dining car	1971	Marquetry motif of Glamis Castle, inlaid with sycamore, madrona burr, yew, peartree and boxwood.
	3275	Harlech	Mark 2e FO	Dining car	1974	Marquetry motif of Harlech Castle and daffodils, inlaid with maple, boxwood, sycamore and European walnut.
	17167	Mow Cop	Mark 2d BFK	Service car	1972	Named for Mow Cop Castle in Cheshire.
	3182	Warwick	Mark 2d FO	Dining car	1971	Marquetry motif of Warwick Castle, inlaid with walnut, boxwood, satinwood and maple.
	1953	—	Mark 1 RU	Kitchen car	1960	
	92904	—	Mark 1 BG	Baggage car	1956	Original number 80867.

== Locomotives and operation ==
The Northern Belle was originally hauled by English, Welsh and Scottish Railway (EWS) Class 67s. EWS was bought by DB Schenker in 2007 and then in 2011, Direct Rail Services (DRS) started a five-year contract to operate the service with Class 47s and later Class 57s. In 2011, preparation of the carriages moved from Arriva TrainCare to the Severn Valley Railway.

The Northern Belle was sold to West Coast Railways proprietor David Smith and businessman David Pitts in November 2017. Since April 2018 the train has been hauled by West Coast Railways' (WCR) class 57s. Carriage preparation was transferred to Carnforth at the same time.

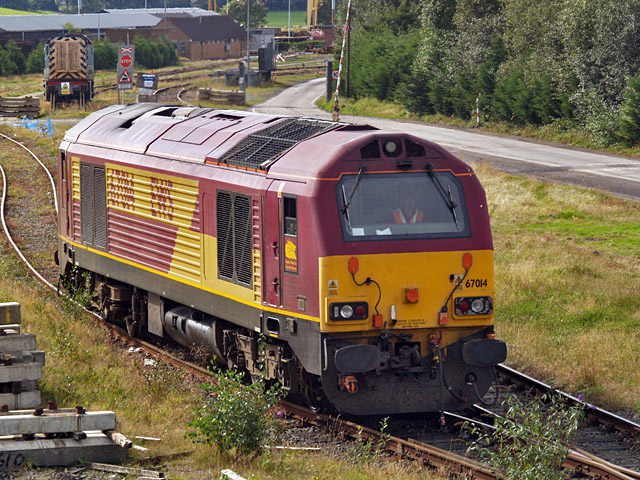
EWS 67014

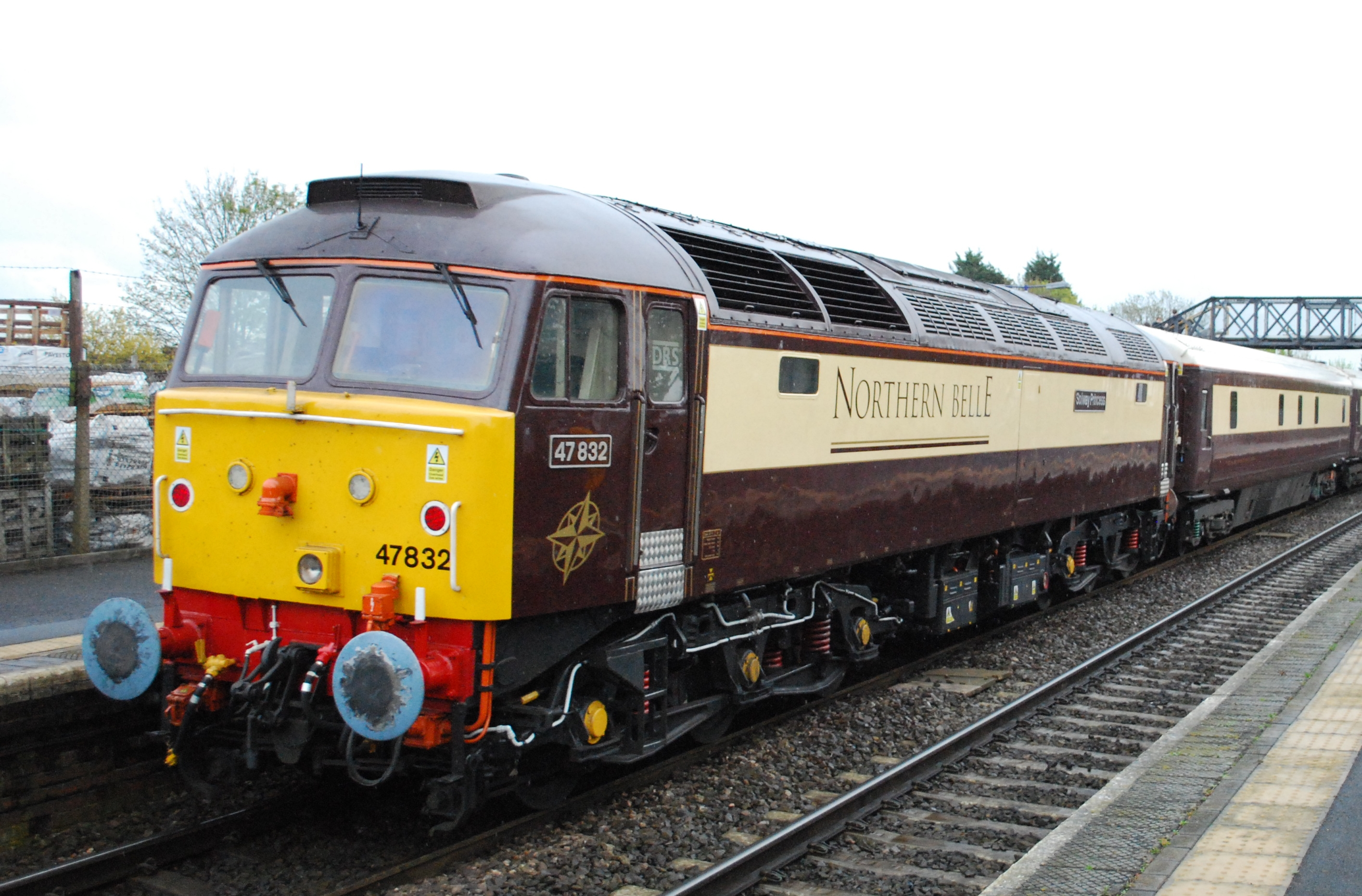
DRS 47832 Solway Princess

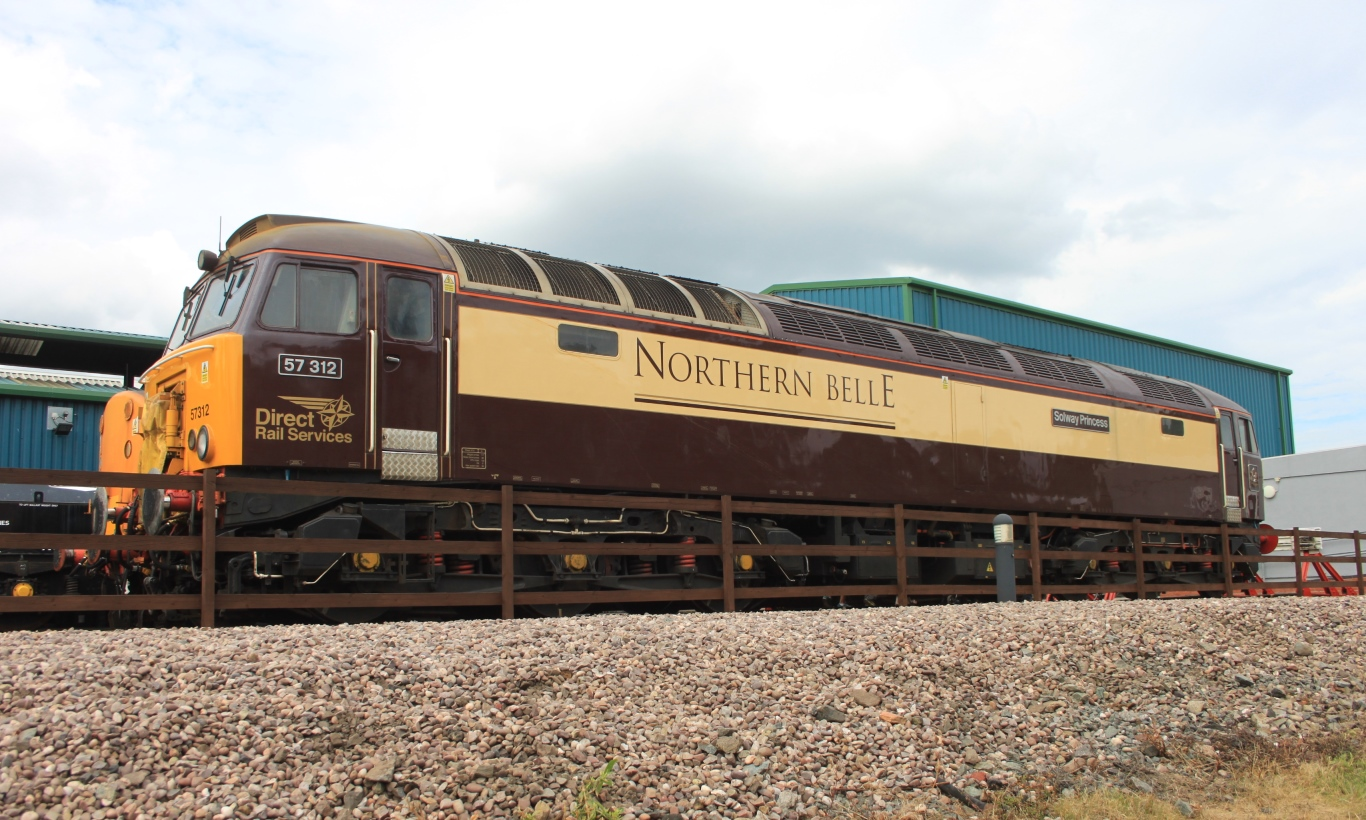
DRS 57312 Solway Princess

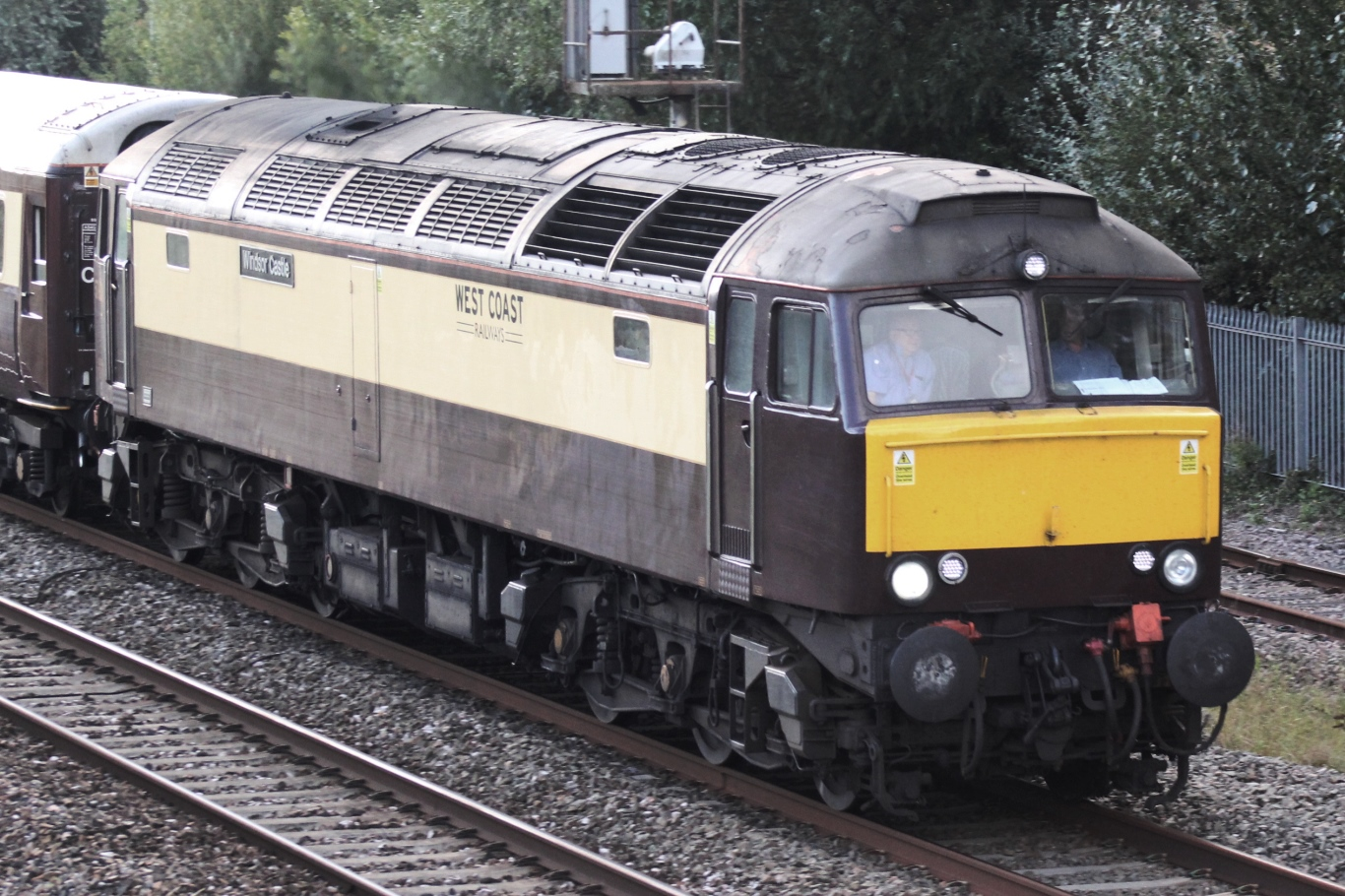
WCR 57601

== See also ==
- Scarborough Spa Express
