= British Rail Class 88 =

Class of electro-diesel railway locomotives in Great Britain

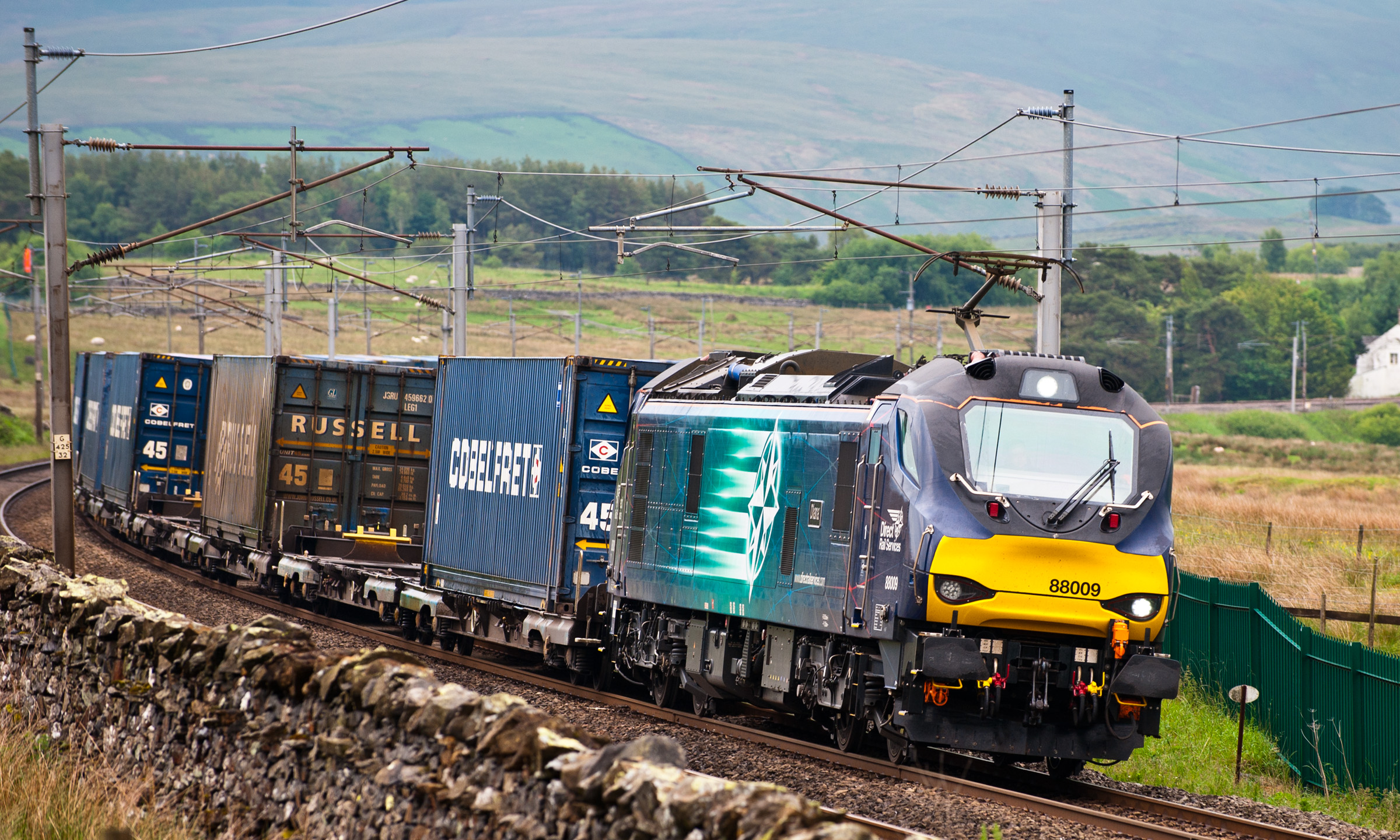
- Class 88 at Scout Green
Type and origin
- Power type: Electro-diesel
- Designer: Vossloh
- Builder: Vossloh España/Stadler Rail Valencia
- Model: Stadler Euro Dual
- Build date: 2015–2016
- Total produced: 10
Specifications
- Configuration
  - UIC: Bo′Bo′
  - Commonwealth: Bo-Bo
- Gauge: 1,435 mm (4 ft 8 1/2 in) standard gauge
- Wheel diameter: 1,067 mm (42.0 in)
- Axle load: 21.5 t (21.2 long tons; 23.7 short tons)
- Loco weight: 86 t (85 long tons; 95 short tons)
- Fuel type: Diesel
- Electric system/s: 25 kV AC Catenary
- Current pickup: Brecknell Willis high speed pantograph
- Prime mover: Caterpillar C27
- Engine type: Four-stroke V12
- Transmission: electrical AC/AC type, ABB
- MU working: Within class and with Class 68
- Train heating: Electric, HEP inverter up to 500 kW (ETH index 96)
- Train brakes: wheel disc, electropneumatic dynamic (regenerative*)
Performance figures
- Maximum speed: 100 mph (160 km/h)
- Power output: 4 MW (5,400 hp) electrical 0.7 MW (940 hp) diesel
- Tractive effort: 317 kN (71,000 lb_{f})
Career
- Operators: Direct Rail Services
- Numbers: 88001–88010
- Current owner: Beacon Rail

The British Rail Class 88 is a type of main line mixed traffic electro-diesel locomotive, manufactured by Vossloh España/Stadler Rail Valencia for Direct Rail Services (DRS) in Great Britain. The locomotive is part of the Stadler Euro Dual group and is the first dual-mode locomotive in Great Britain to use 25 kV AC railway electrification.

Amid the fulfillment of DRS's order for the Class 68, Vossloh's team proposed the development of a dual-mode locomotive that could be alternatively powered by an onboard diesel engine or via electricity supplied from overhead lines (OHLE). Having been impressed by the concept, DRS opted to place an order for ten Class 88s in September 2013. Having been developed alongside the Class 68, considerable similarities are shared between the two locomotives, amounting to roughly 70% of all components being shared.

Testing of the first Class 88 was undertaken at the Velim Test Centre in the Czech Republic during 2016; these trials proved to be relatively smooth. During July 2016, 88001 made the type's first official public appearance. In January 2017, 88002 Prometheus was the first Class 88 to be delivered; all ten Class 88 locomotives arrived by March 2017. In June 2017, the type entered regular service with DRS; locomotives have been typically used to haul freight trains, although they are also fitted for hauling passenger services.

== Background ==
=== Origins ===
During January 2012, DRS announced that it had ordered a total of 15 new diesel locomotives from Vossloh España (Stadler Rail Valencia, since 2016). These locomotives, which entered service in the UK as Class 68, were part of the company's Eurolight family, redesigned to fit the smaller UK loading gauge. DRS had opted to procure a clean-sheet design after examining various existing alternatives, such as the ubiquitous Class 66 locomotive, which the company's management determined to be incapable of satisfactorily replacing its ageing fleet of Class 20s, largely due to inefficient engines and elevated operating costs. Vossloh undertook development of the Class 68 over an 18-month period, during which the company studied several derivatives and modifications, including the use of alternative powerplants. Having presented such proposals to DRS, the latter became particularly interested in the electro-diesel arrangement, as the company's management recognised there was a potential role for a dual-mode locomotive in the British market.

During September 2013, DRS announced that it had placed an order for a further ten locomotives, which were designated as Class 88. The most distinctive difference between the new locomotives and the preceding Class 68 was that the Class 88 would harness a dual-mode electro-diesel propulsion system. Accordingly, these locomotives could be powered either via overhead lines (OHLE) or by an onboard diesel engine. In comparison to conventional diesel locomotives, this arrangement enables operational costs to be significantly reduced when diagrammed on routes partially or entirely under OHLE, under which the diesel engine can be deactivated. The Class 88 is the first dual-mode locomotives in Great Britain to use the 25kV AC electrification, as the only other electro-diesel locomotives to have entered service on the British network were the Classes 73 and 74, which operated in the Southern Region using third rail electrification.

=== Specification ===
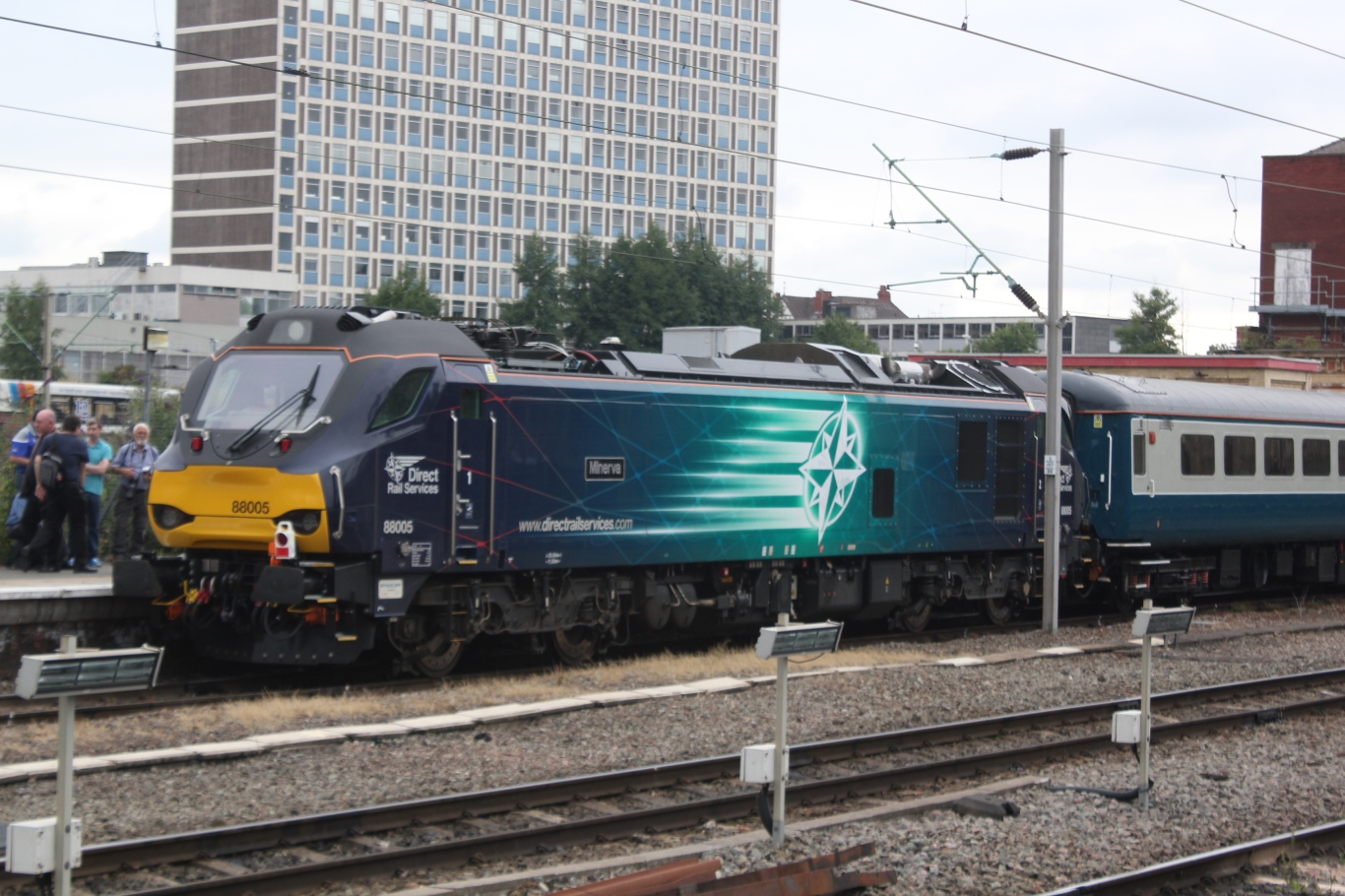
Class 88 at Crewe with a charter train

The Class 88 is part of the Stadler Euro Dual group, which is a range of dual-mode locomotives that are fitted both with a pantograph, to collect electricity from overhead wires, and a Caterpillar diesel engine. The British version is able to run either on electrified lines using the pantograph, which is the British standard OHLE current at 25kv AC, or away from electrified lines with the Caterpillar C27 950 hp (710 kW) engine. Dual-mode locomotives have previously been mooted for freight use, using the Last Mile principle, where a primarily electric locomotive is fitted with a small diesel engine to allow locomotives to run without a load to non-electrified freight sidings.

The Class 88 also has a primarily electric design, with most of the interior space of its machine room is occupied by electrical equipment and the diesel prime mover housed in a separate room to the side of the central aisle. However, in terms of power, the Class 88 holds an intermediate position between primarily electric locomotives with auxiliary diesel engines and fully dual-mode locomotives, such as Class 93 and Class 99. It is powerful enough to haul a normal freight train in diesel mode on its own like a road switcher diesel locomotive, although with only 17.5% of the power it would otherwise have in electric mode, so in diesel mode it is mostly suitable to last mile operations in sidings or on freight-only branches.

In the majority of its aspects, the Class 88 featured a high degree of commonality with the preceding Class 68, including the use of an identical bodyshell, cab, brakes, bogies, traction equipment and control software; roughly 70% of all components are shared between the two classes. Akin to the Class 68, the Class 88 can achieve a maximum speed of 100 mph (160 km/h), sufficient for regular passenger operations, while operating under OHLE, it has a power output of 4,000 kW (5,400 hp). Under diesel power, provided by its 12-cylinder Caterpillar C27, it has a maximum power output of 700 kW (940 hp); however, the maximum tractive effort is available in either mode. The locomotive's engine, which is compliant with the current EU Stage IIIB emission restrictions, has limited available power as a result of the customer's choice to give the Class 88 comparable power to a traditional Class 20.

The Class 88 is outfitted with both dynamic and regenerative braking systems for the locomotive, along with air braking apparatus for the whole train. When applying regenerative braking, up to 4 MW of power may be returned to the OHLE via the catenary. For electricity generation while operating under diesel power, the engine drives an additional traction motor that functions as an alternator, thus avoiding the need for installing a bespoke alternator. The Class 88 has acceleration comparable to a modern family car when operating 'light', typically taking 13 seconds to accelerate from stationary to 60 mph (97 km/h).

=== Testing and delivery ===
In April 2016, the first locomotive of the class, 88001, was dispatched to the Velim Test Centre in the Czech Republic; it was subjected to a series of proving trials. The vehicle approvals process included the hauling of a 1,500-tonne train, along with repetitive tests under differing conditions to judge performance; particular attention was paid to the switching process between diesel and electric modes. The various electrified lines of Great Britain feature around 35 different variations of catenary; the interface between these diverse types and the Class 88's pantograph was a critical part of the acceptance process. The data gathered during the type's trials showed promising results. In July 2016, 88001 made the class's first official public appearance, while 88003 was exhibited at InnoTrans two months later.

During January 2017, 88002 Prometheus became the first of the class to be delivered, arriving via the Port of Southampton and was transferred by road to Carlisle Kingmoor TMD. 88002 was initially used for homologation purposes to secure approval from the Rail Safety and Standards Board (RSSB) for the type's operation in the UK. All ten Class 88 locomotives were delivered by March 2017. During July 2017, it was announced that the Class 88 had entered into revenue service with DRS in the previous month, three examples having been used to haul freight trains within the first four weeks of operations. Initially, use of the onboard diesel engines was avoided while sufficient training was delivered to all drivers on the class and minor modifications were being made by the manufacturer.

== Operation ==
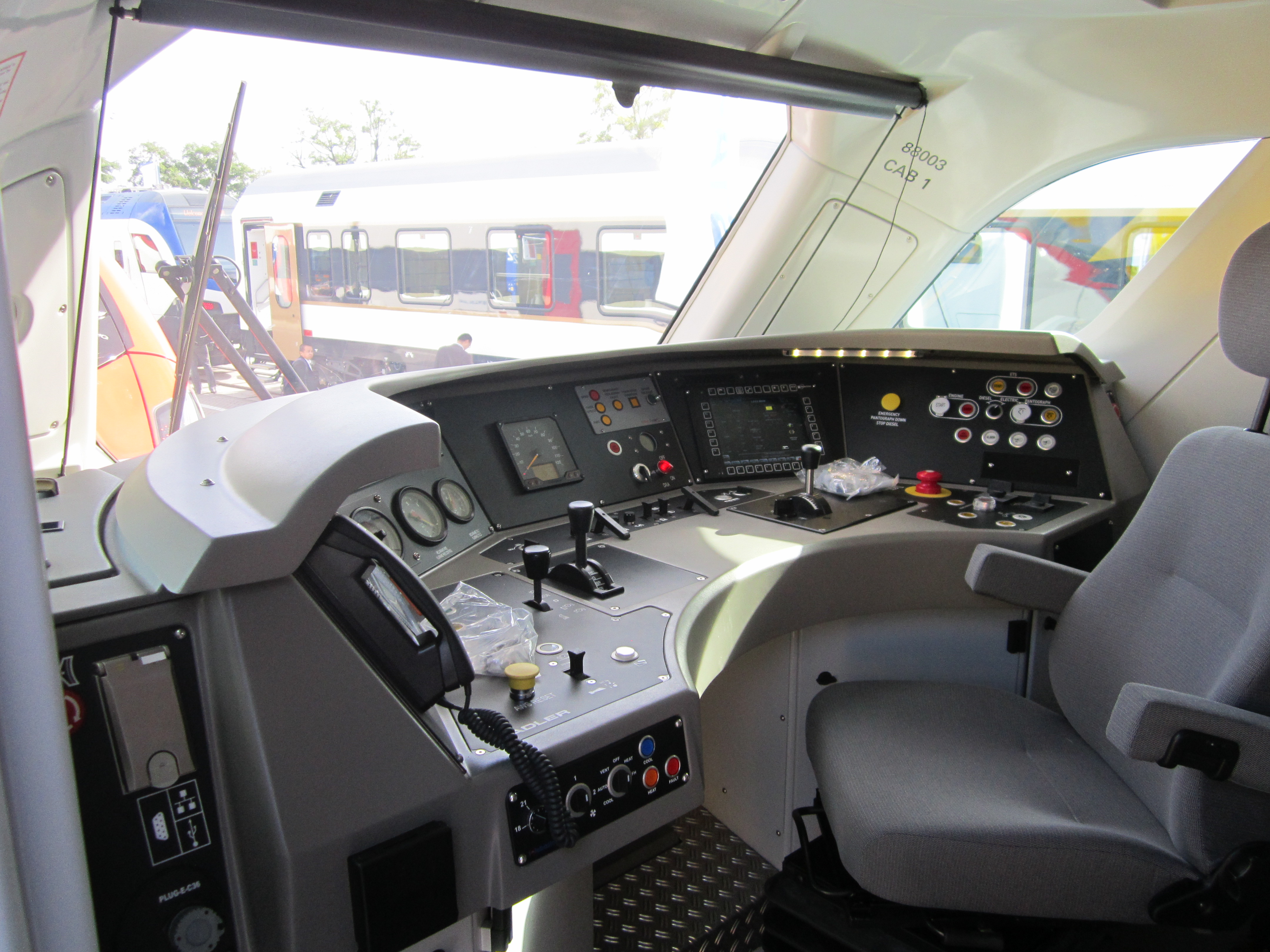
Cab interior

DRS has procured the Class 88 to serve as a mixed-traffic locomotive, capable of operating both passenger and freight services. Primarily, the type has been used by DRS to haul freight using electric locomotives without the need to hire in electric traction from other operators. As with the Class 68, they are also capable of operating passenger trains.

Even prior to the type entering service, it was decided that the first duty of DRS's Class 88 fleet would be the contracted services between Daventry and Mossend on behalf of the Tesco supermarket chain. The service's path has been timed for an electric locomotive and previously necessitated the use of a pair of Class 68s working in multiple. Other diagrams for the Class 88 have been focused on those that have previously been run under the wires with diesel traction.

=== Named locomotives ===
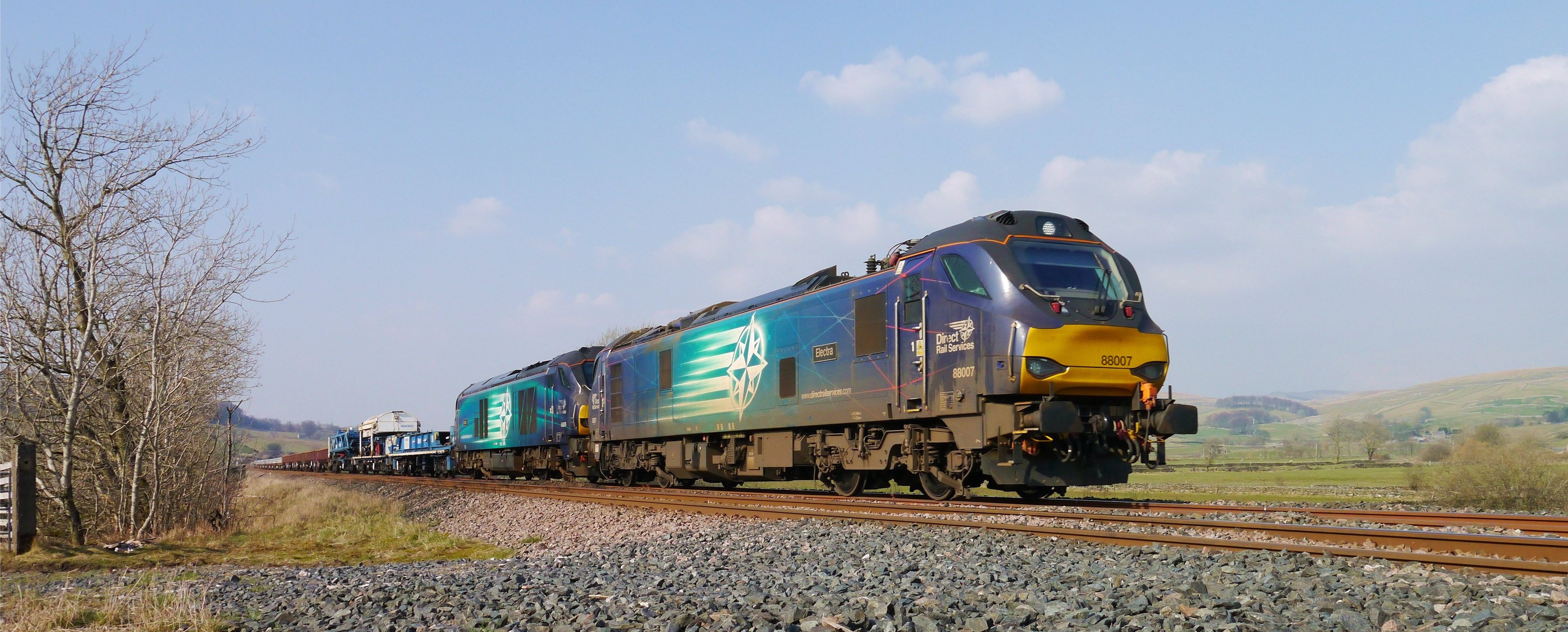
Locomotive 88007 Electra at Helwith Bridge

The names given to Class 88 locomotives are as follows:

Number	Name	Operator	Notes
88001	Revolution	Direct Rail Services	
88002	Prometheus	Direct Rail Services	
88003	Genesis	Direct Rail Services	
88004	Pandora	Direct Rail Services	
88005	Minerva	Direct Rail Services	
88006	Juno	Direct Rail Services	
88007	Electra	Direct Rail Services	
88008	Ariadne	Direct Rail Services	
88009	Diana	Direct Rail Services	
88010	Tesco 20 Years of Rail Freight	Direct Rail Services	Formerly Aurora. Renamed in 2026.

Eight of these (88002 and 88004–10) revive names previously carried by Classes 76 and 77 (EM1 and EM2) electric locomotives, built in the 1950s for the Woodhead line electrification.

== Fleet details ==
Class	Operator	Number built	Year built	Locomotive numbers
Class 88	Direct Rail Services	10	2015–16	88001–88010

== Models ==
In conjunction with Rails of Sheffield, Dapol produced a model of the Class 88 in OO scale; there are four examples: 88001, 88003, 88007 and 88010.
