= Murder of Genesis Cornejo-Alvarado =

Murder of a 15-year-old girl in Houston, TX, USA

- Location: Houston, Texas, U.S.
- Date: February 16, 2017
- Deaths: 1
- Injuries: 1
- Victims: Genesis Cornejo-Alvarado (murdered), unidentified 14-year-old girl (kidnapped)
- Perpetrators: Miguel Alvarez-Flores and Diego Hernandez-Rivera
- Motive: Satanism
- Charges: Murder, aggravated kidnapping

On February 16, 2017, a fifteen-year-old girl, later identified as Genesis Cornejo-Alvarado, was found shot to death and dumped in the middle of a road near Southwest Houston. Cornejo lived in Jersey Village and had been missing for about a month.

Miguel Alvarez-Flores and Diego Hernandez-Rivera, two MS-13 gang members, Satanists, and illegal immigrants from El Salvador, were charged with her murder and the kidnapping of a fourteen-year-old girl. The girl claimed that she had run away from school and that Alvarez and Hernandez had kidnapped her, sexually assaulted her, and forced her to take drugs as she was held in their apartment for over a month.

During their arraignment, Alvarez and Hernandez generated controversy by laughing and waving at ABC cameras.

== Background ==
Cornejo was born and raised in New York City and her family had recently moved to Houston. She had been missing for a month before the events.

Alvarez and Hernandez are both Salvadoran undocumented immigrants, Satanists, and members of MS-13.

== Events ==
Cornejo had been reported missing a month before her death. On February 16, her dead body was found on Sharpcrest Street in Southwest Houston. Police said that she had been shot twice at close range. Her body remained unidentified until March. The National Center for Missing & Exploited Children reconstructed the victim and created a poster in efforts to identify her.

A fourteen-year-old girl was also allegedly kidnapped. She told the police that she had run away from school a month earlier and that she was kidnapped, sexually assaulted, and forced to take drugs. She also claims to have been forcibly tattooed by Alvarez.

The victim told the police that when Cornejo criticized a Satanic shrine in the apartment, which Alvarez and Hernandez called "The Beast", Alvarez felt offended and offered the statue a cigarette, but then he said that the statue wanted a soul instead.

After they allegedly killed Cornejo, the victim was able to escape and lead police to Alvarez and Hernandez. Prosecutors say that Hernandez admitted to shooting Cornejo after the pair were arrested.

== Legal proceedings ==
Alvarez and Hernandez were charged with murder and aggravated kidnapping. During their arraignment, they both waved and smiled at the cameras. On May 26, 2021, both men were sentenced to 40 years in prison after pleading guilty to her murder. Hernandez was sentenced to an additional 12 years for aggravated assault with a deadly weapon to run concurrently with his 40 year sentence.

== See also ==
- List of kidnappings
- List of solved missing person cases (post-2000)
