= Direct Rail Services =

Rail freight company in Great Britain

Direct Rail Services Ltd.

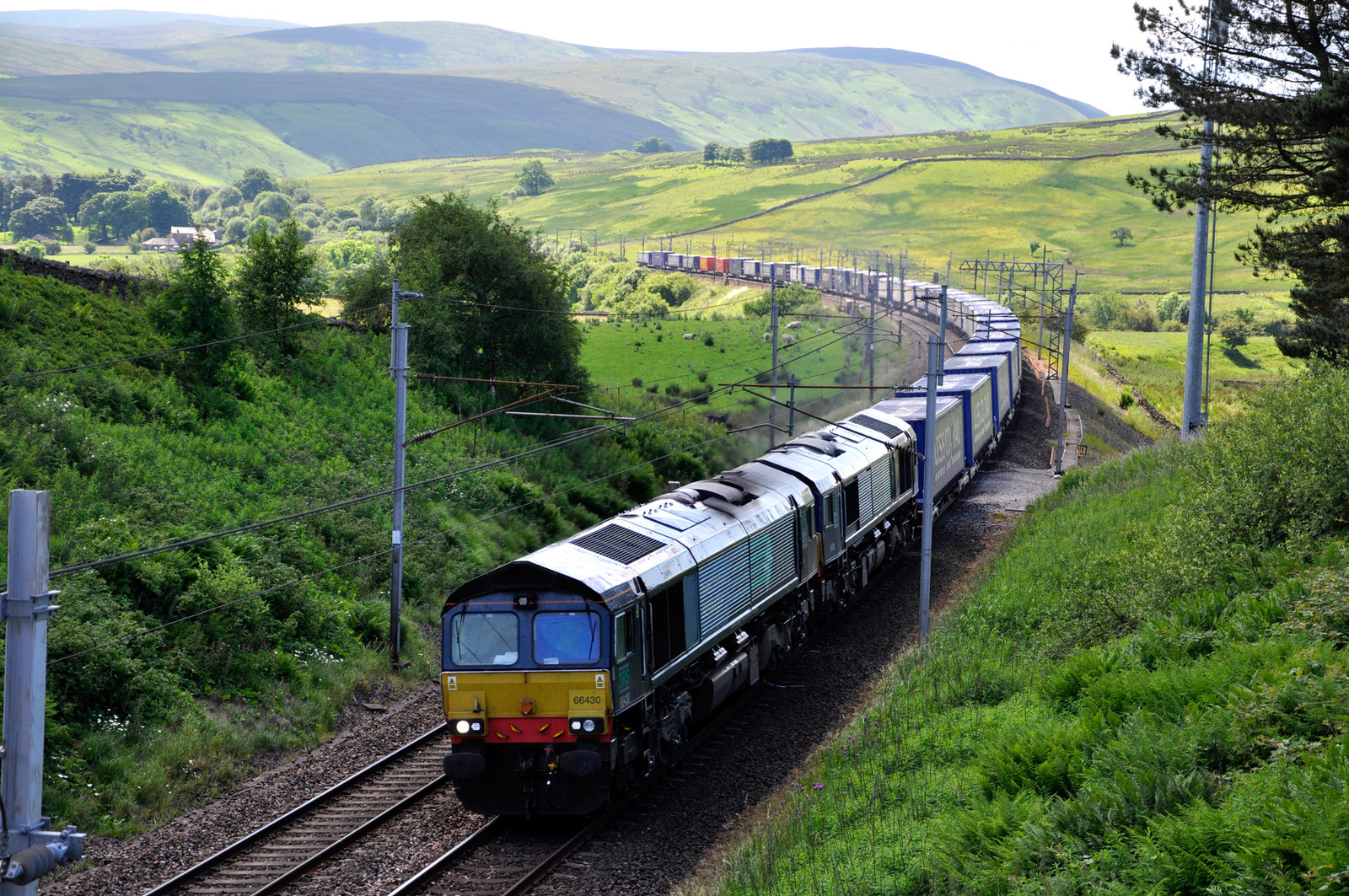
- DRS Class 66 container train at Scotchman's Bridge in 2014

Overview
- Main region: Great Britain
- Parent company: Nuclear Transport Services (part of the Nuclear Decommissioning Authority)
- Headquarters: Carlisle, England, UK
- Dates of operation: February 1995–present

Other
- Website: www.directrailservices.com

Direct Rail Services (DRS) is a rail freight company in Great Britain, and is one of the publicly owned railway companies in the United Kingdom.

DRS was created as a wholly owned subsidiary of British Nuclear Fuels Ltd (BNFL) during late 1994 with the primary purpose of taking over the rail-based handling of nuclear material from British Rail. As early as 1997, the company began diversification into other operations, initially bidding for contracts to haul freight traffic for other companies such as Tesco and Eddie Stobart Group. Furthermore, DRS has branched into passenger services, these have included charters, such as the Northern Belle, and contracts with operators such as National Express East Anglia, Chiltern Railways, and Arriva Rail North. Additional rolling stock, such as the Class 57 and Class 88 locomotives, have been acquired by DRS during the 2010s.

In 2005, DRS was transferred from BNFL to the newly created Nuclear Decommissioning Authority (NDA). During early 2021, further restructuring led to DRS, along with sibling subsidiaries Pacific Nuclear Transport Limited (PNTL) and International Nuclear Services (INS), falling under a new NDA division, Nuclear Transport Solutions (NTS).

== History ==
=== Early operations ===
The origins of Direct Rail Services (DRS) can be traced back to the privatisation of British Rail during the 1990s; British Nuclear Fuels Ltd (BNFL) had a long-standing arrangement with British Rail for the latter to undertake the haulage of nuclear flask traffic, but the pending dissolution of British Rail led to BNFL considering other options. In October 1994, it was announced that BNFL had decided to perform rail transport and other railway-related services internally. For this purpose, DRS was set up as a wholly owned rail freight subsidiary of BNFL, initially using a small fleet of five Class 20/3 locomotives.

Prior to 1998, DRS's nuclear haulage activities were exclusively related to the transporting of nuclear fuel rods from overseas to Sellafield for processing. During 1998, DRS took over the movement of fuel rods from various nuclear power stations across Britain, such as Heysham, Valley (for Wylfa), Bridgwater (for Hinkley Point), Berkeley (for Oldbury), Hunterston, Torness, Seaton Carew, Dungeness and Sizewell.

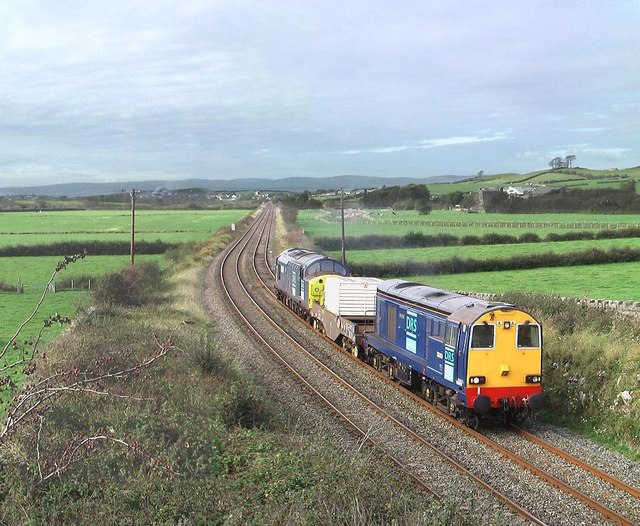
DRS Class 20 locomotive hauling a nuclear waste train, the original and continuing core service of the company

During 1997, DRS began to diversify into the haulage of other traffic, having secured a contract to operate milk traffic from Penrith to Cricklewood. In 2002, it commenced running intermodal freight trains from Grangemouth to the Daventry International Rail Freight Terminal using Class 66/4 locomotives; it carries containers for both the Malcolm Group and Asda. In May 2020, DRS announced it had launched a new electrified freight route between the Daventry Freight Terminal and Mossend Yard, outside Glasgow.

The ownership of DRS was transferred from BNFL to the Nuclear Decommissioning Authority (NDA), following the creation of the NDA on 1 April 2005 under the terms of the Energy Act 2004. Since April 2021, DRS, as well as its sibling NDA subsidiaries Pacific Nuclear Transport Limited (PNTL) and International Nuclear Services (INS), have been operated by a newly created NDA division, Nuclear Transport Solutions (NTS).

During 2006, DRS started a new service, the Tesco Express, on behalf of the Eddie Stobart Group in partnership with Tesco, the UK's largest food retailer, to move containers from Daventry north to Mossend and Inverness using a new dedicated low-emission Class 66 locomotive in Eddie Stobart livery, 66411 Eddie the Engine. A daily service from Grangemouth to Inverness followed in 2009, with another Class 66 in a promotional livery, this time 66414 James the Engine. The Daventry – Scotland Stobart contract transferred to DB Schenker in January 2010, along with the onward daily service to Inverness, though this reverted to DRS operation in summer 2011. In January 2022, DRS and Tesco signed a three-year extension deal; by this point, the company was transporting roughly 12,000 containers for Tesco per month.

As of 2021, DRS has stated its intention to grow its presence in the rail freight sector, particular in Scotland.

=== Passenger services ===
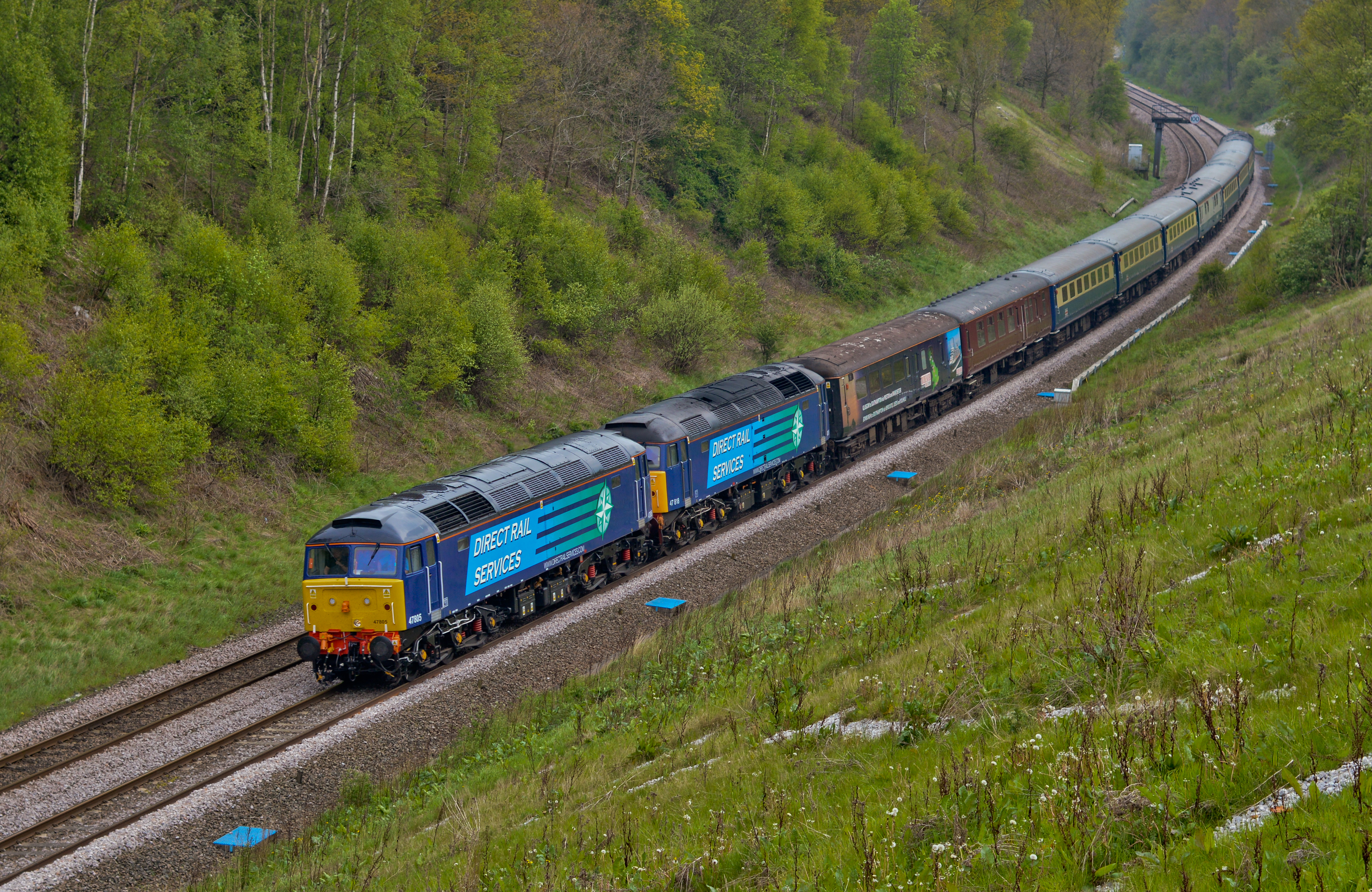
A pair of DRS Class 47s hauling a rake of carriages passing near Stretton, Derbyshire

In 2007, seven Mark 3 carriages from Virgin Trains were refurbished at the Oxley depot. The following year saw the coaches used to operate charter services under the Stobart Rail banner, however, the Stobart Rail operation ceased in July 2008.

In June 2009, DRS commenced operating rescue locomotive duties on the Great Eastern Main Line for the train operator National Express East Anglia, as well as hauling Class 90 electric locomotives from Norwich to Great Yarmouth on summer Saturdays. This included Summer Saturday Wherry Lines services. DRS have periodically operated services on the Wherry Lines during periods of diesel multiple unit shortage. During October 2014, it commenced operating a two-year contract to operate services on the Wherry Lines under contract to Abellio Greater Anglia. It was operated by top and tailed Class 47s hauling Mark 2s, top and tail Class 37s were introduced in mid-2015.

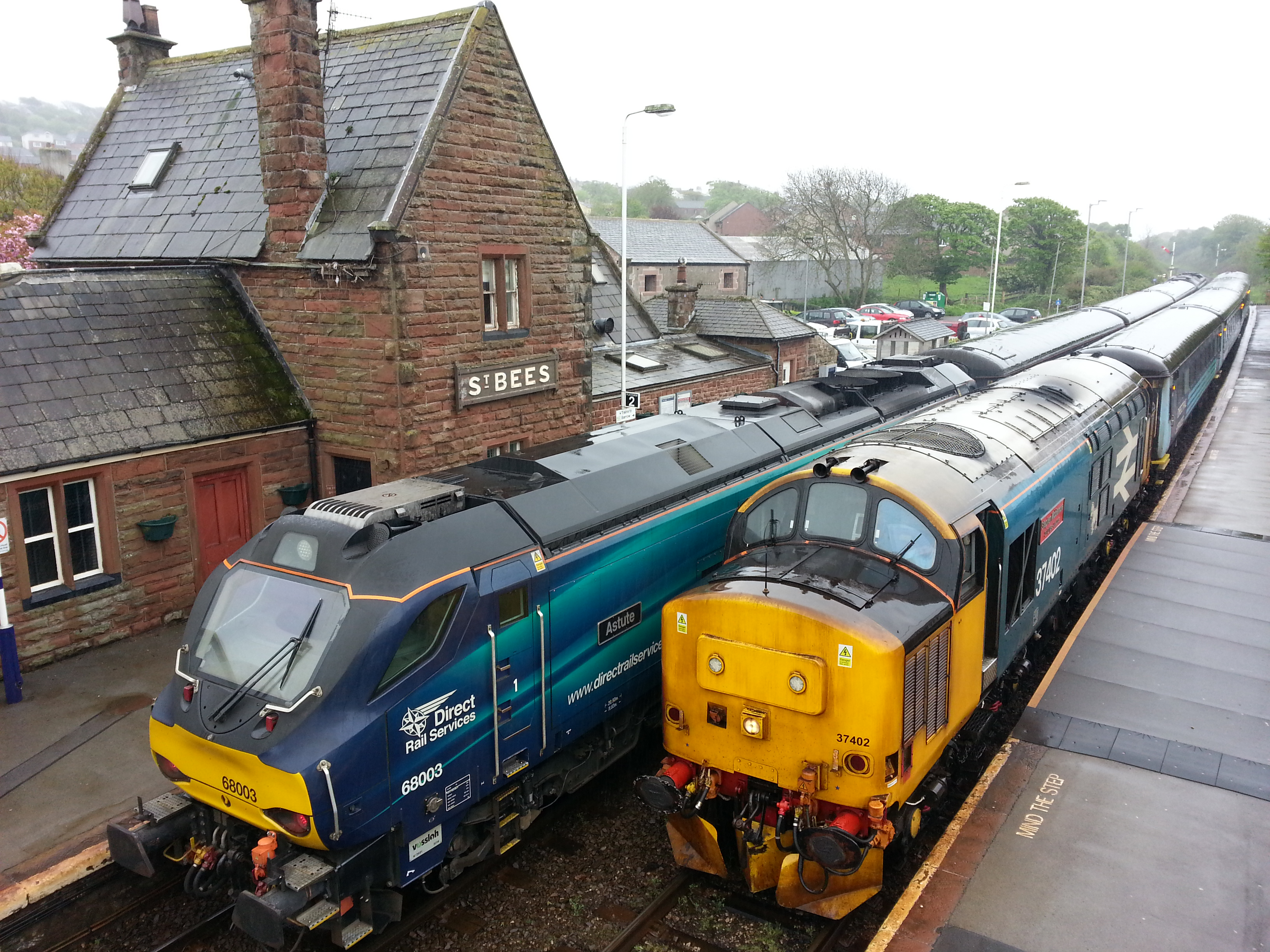
DRS Class 37 and Class 68 cross with Mark 2 passenger stock at St Bees on the Cumbrian Coast Line.

Between 30 November 2009 and 28 May 2010, DRS ran a service on the Cumbrian Coast Line between Maryport and Workington following a road bridge being destroyed by floods. The trains were made up of Class 37s, Class 47s and Class 57s top and tailing DRS' Mark 3 carriages.

During April 2011, DRS commenced a five-year contract under which it provided Class 47 locomotives to haul the Northern Belle, a luxury passenger train. By 2013, the company was operating 140 passenger charters annually, roughly 100 of which were for the Northern Belle. By April 2018, the train was being hauled by Class 57s operated by West Coast Railways, the owner of the Northern Belle, instead.

On 9 January 2012, a trial service was introduced for six weeks by the NDA for its workers, with DRS supplying a Class 37 to haul four Mark 2 carriages between Carlisle and Sellafield. Although the trial was reported to have been a success, plans to introduce regular services from December 2012 did not materialise until May 2015. To operate these services, DRS purchased a fleet of Mark 2 carriages and had these overhauled at Eastleigh Works. In May 2015, the company started to operate some services on the Cumbrian Coast Line under contract to Northern Rail (later Arriva Rail North) using top and tail Class 37s which hauled Mark 2 coaches. On 27 July 2015, one of the Class 37s was replaced by a DBSO, with the other replaced at a later date. On 29 January 2018, one set was made to be Top and Tail Class 68s, while the other stayed a Class 37 and DBSO. On 21 May 2018, there was only one set out, which was the Top and Tail Class 68s only running between Carlisle and Barrow-in-Furness. This service was ultimately replaced by Class 156 Diesel Multiple Units (transferred from ScotRail) on 28 December 2018, with special commemorative 'farewell' service being run for charity on 11 January 2019.

In June 2014, it was announced that Chiltern Railways had signed a contract with DRS for the latter to provide six of its Class 68 locomotives to haul express passenger services, replacing Class 67s hired from DBS. On 15 December 2014, the first of DRS-hauled Chiltern service departed Marylebone station; Chiltern noted that the Class 68s will be capable of hauling extended trains in the future. In addition to the locomotives themselves, DRS provided commissioning and maintenance services.

== Depots ==
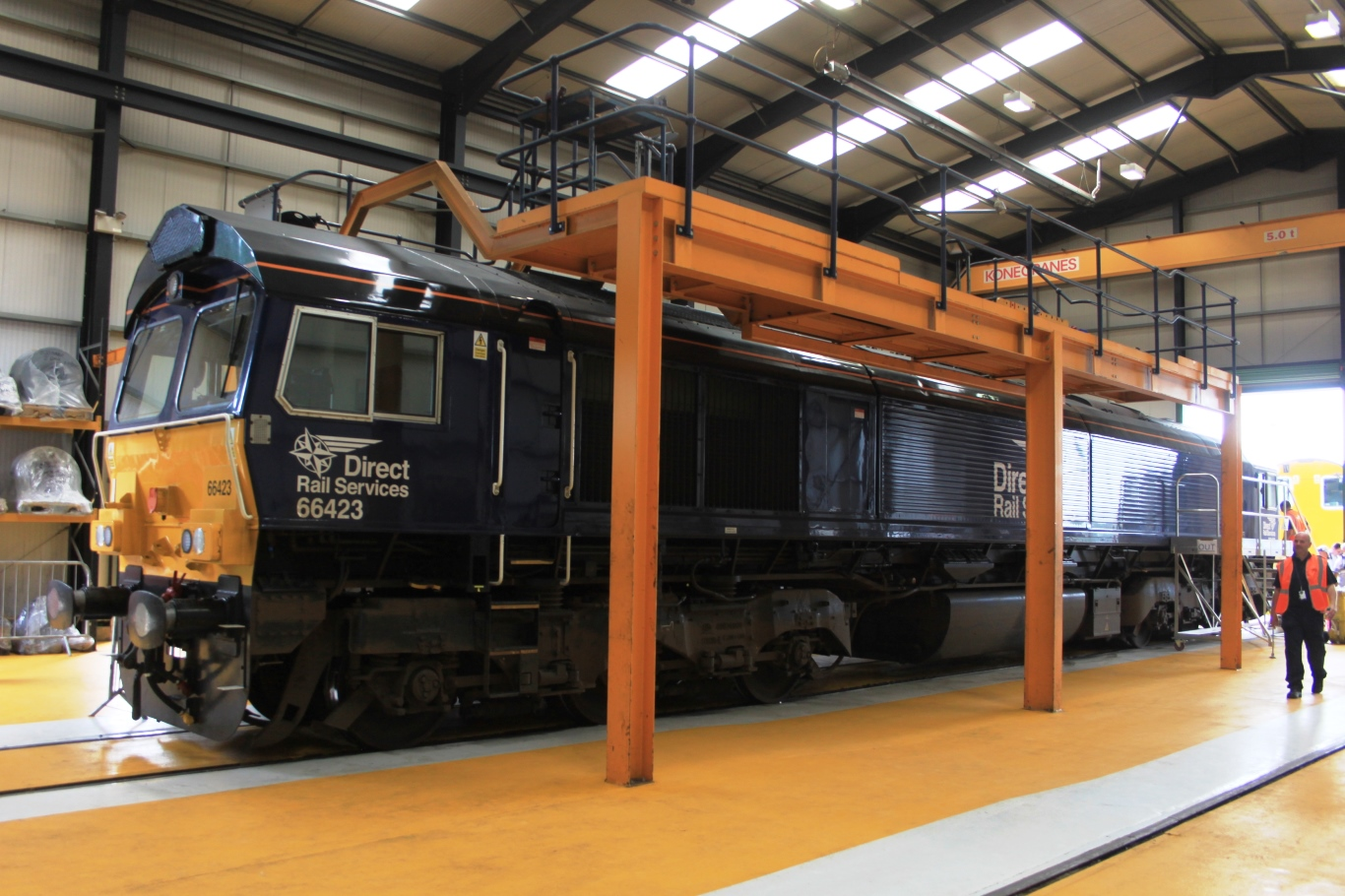
A Class 66 locomotive being serviced at Crewe

Direct Rail Services initially operated from a base at the nuclear reprocessing plant in Sellafield, but in 1998 moved into Carlisle Kingmoor depot which had been disused since 1987. A second depot was opened at Crewe Gresty Bridge in March 2007. This is on the site of a former wagon works. It also operates the Motherwell depot, where it carries out inspection work and re-fuelling.

== Fleet ==
The initial fleet of locomotives were five Class 20/3s which were overhauled at Brush Traction, Loughborough for their new duties.

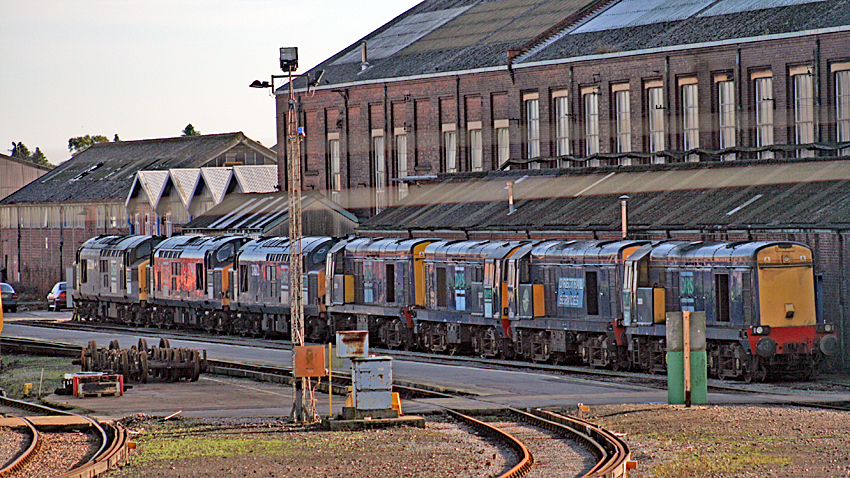
DRS locos awaiting overhaul at Eastleigh Works, October 2009

In 1997, six Class 37/6s were purchased from international high speed passenger operator Eurostar. DRS would later build up an extensive fleet of Class 37 and 47 locomotives from various sources. In 2001, a number of Class 33s were purchased. During 2004, three Class 87s were trialed, but returned to their leasing company after six months. During 2008, DRS initiated efforts to acquire Class 57 locomotives; by 2013, it operated nine former Freightliner 57/0s as well as 12 former Virgin Trains 57/3s.

On 12 September 2013, it was announced that DRS would be the launch customer for the new Vossloh Euro Dual dual-mode freight locomotive by Vossloh España. These would become Class 88. DRS took delivery of the first of 15 new Class 68s in February 2014; these are diesel-only versions of the Class 88s which would arrive later. During October 2014, a further ten were ordered followed by another seven in July 2015. In April 2015, two Class 68s commenced operating Fife Circle Line services for Abellio ScotRail. A further batch of six Class 68s (68020–68025) were delivered by on 5 April 2016.

On 8 January 2016, DRS announced it would sell 12 of its older locomotives, including one Class 20 locomotive (20312), six Class 37 locomotives (37503/510/521/608/611/670) and five Class 47 locomotives (47810/13/18/28/53) along with two of its Mark 2 coaches. By January 2022, the company was in the process of disposing of older rolling stock, such as Class 20s, Class 37s, Class 57s, and Mark 2 coaches, along with associated spare parts and other elements; this was reportedly one part of a wider fleet modernisation effort.

Class 66 locomotives 66301-66305 left DRS for GBRf at the end of 2022, as DRS restructured its fleet.

In 2026, all remaining Class 57 locomotives were sold to GWR, Locomotive Services Limited, Romic Group and West Coast Railways. The former six Chiltern Railways Class 68s returned to Direct Rail Services in 2025-2026. The former 14 TransPennine Express Class 68s transferred to Chiltern Railways to work with the Mark 5A coaching stock to form the new Chiltern Explorer service.

=== Current fleet ===
| Class | Image | Type | Built | Number | Wheel Arr | Notes |
|---|---|---|---|---|---|---|
| Class 66/0,& 66/4 | | Diesel locomotive | 2002-08 | 19 | Co-Co | Originally a fleet of 39 locomotives. Only 19 are in use with DRS as of 2024. |
| Class 68/0 | | Diesel locomotive | 2013-17 | 20 | Bo-Bo | Originally a fleet of 34 locomotives. Only 20 are in use with DRS as of 2026. |
| Class 88/0 | | Bi-mode locomotive | 2015 | 10 | Bo-Bo | |

=== Past fleet ===
| Class | Image | Type | Built | Number | Wheel Arr | Notes |
|---|---|---|---|---|---|---|
| Class 20/3, 20/9 | | Diesel locomotive | 1957-1962, 1965-1968 | 21 | Bo-Bo | Fleet of 21 locomotives. All were withdrawn between 2004 and 2016.: 13 sold to Harry Needle Railroad Company with 10 in storage; 6 scrapped; 2 sold to Balfour Beatty |
| Class 33/0, 33/2, 33/3 Minimodal | | Diesel locomotive | 1960-62 | 5 | Bo-Bo | Fleet of 5 locomotives. All withdrawn in September 2005.: 4 sold to West Coast Railways; 1 scrapped |
| Class 37/0, 37/4, & 37/7 | | Diesel locomotive | 1960-65 | 20 | Co-Co | Fleet of 20 locomotives. All were withdrawn between 2016 and 2024.: 9 stored at Harry Needle Railroad Company; 4 sold to Europhoenix; 3 sold to Locomotive Services Limited; 2 sold to Harry Needle Railroad Company; 1 sold to Loram UK; 1 scrapped |
| Class 47/5, 47/7 & 47/8 | | Diesel locomotive | 1962-1968 | 16 | Co-Co | Fleet of 16 locomotives. All were withdrawn between 2012 and 2018.: 6 sold to Locomotive Services Limited; 5 scrapped; 2 sold to West Coast Railways; 1 sold to Rail Operations Group; 1 preserved by D05 Preservation Limited; 1 sold to Arlington Fleet Group, Eastleigh to be used as a shunter |
| Class 57/0 & 57/3 | | Diesel locomotive | 1998-2004 | 21 | Co-Co | 6 sold to West Coast Railways with 2 used as a source of spare parts; 6 sold to Locomotive Services Limited, 1 of which was later scrapped; 4 sold to GBRf; 2 sold to Romic Group; 2 sold to GWR, with one used a source of spare parts; 1 sold to Harry Needle Railroad Company |
| Class 66/4 | | Diesel locomotive | 2002-2008 | 20 | Co-Co | 10 sold to Freightliner; 10 sold to GBRF |
| Class 68/0 | | Diesel locomotive | 2013-2017 | 14 | Bo-Bo | 14 returned to Beacon Rail Leasing after use with TransPennine Express and have since been leased to Chiltern Railways for their Chiltern Explorer sets. |
| Class 87 | | Electric locomotive | 1973-1975 | 3 | Bo-Bo | 3 trialled during 2004 for three months before being returned to their leasing company. |
| Class 90 | | Electric locomotive | 1987-1990 | 1 | Bo-Bo | 1 leased from DB Cargo UK for use with Virgin Trains for their "Pretendolino" train before being returned. |
