= Stadler EuroDual =

Electro-diesel locomotive

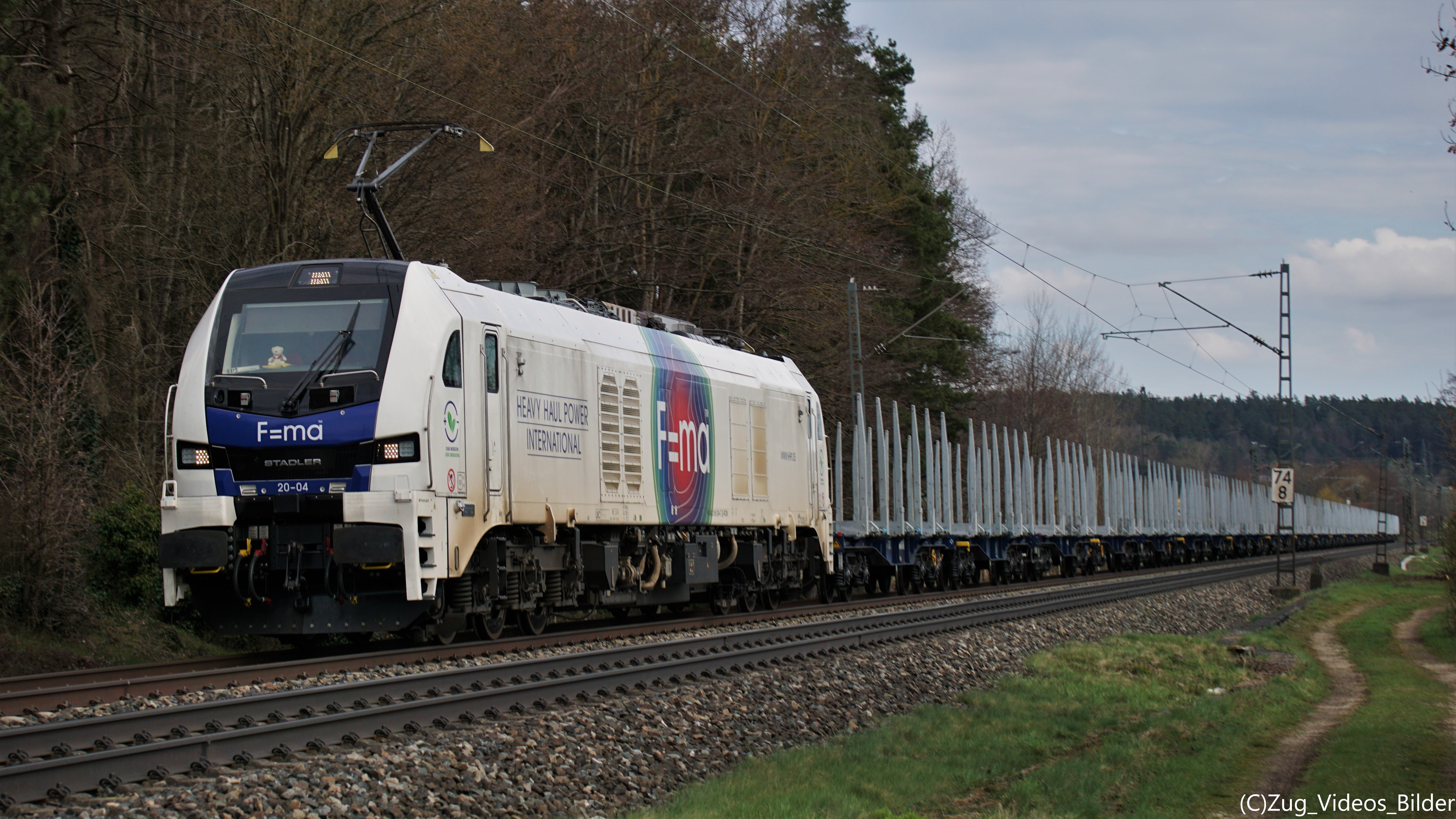
- Stadler Eurodual locomotive 159 20-04 belonging to German operator Heavy Haul Power International (HHPI) with empty timber train from Parsberg to Bendorf in April 2021
Type and origin
- Power type: Electro-diesel
- Builder: Vossloh España (2012–2015); Stadler Rail (2016–)
Specifications
- Configuration
  - AAR: B-B
  - UIC: Co'Co'; Bo'Bo' *†
- Gauge: 1,435 mm (4 ft 8 1/2 in)
- Wheel diameter: 1,067 mm (42.0 in)
- Axle load: 19 to 21 t (19 to 21 long tons; 21 to 23 short tons)
- Loco weight: 114 to 126 t (112 to 124 long tons; 126 to 139 short tons)
- Fuel type: Diesel
- Fuel capacity: 2,500 to 5,000 L (550 to 1,100 imp gal; 660 to 1,320 US gal)
- Electric system/s: 15 kV 16.7 Hz, (or 25 kV 50 Hz, or 1.5 kV DC, or 3 kV DC); 25 kV 50 Hz * 3 kV DC †
- Current pickup: Pantograph
- Prime mover: CAT 8 to 16 cylinder, 1800 rpm
- RPM range: 1800 RPM
- Engine type: V8 to V16 Diesel Engine
- Aspiration: Turbocharger
- Generator: AC
- Traction motors: 6× motors
- Cylinders: 8-16
- Transmission: electrical AC/AC type, ABB
- MU working: None
- Train heating: 500 kW^{UK}
- Loco brake: Dynamic brake, Electric brake, Disc Brake, Straight air
- Train brakes: Air
- Safety systems: ETCS, PZB, LZB, Sifa, SCMT, RSC, ATB EG
Performance figures
- Maximum speed: 110 mph (180 km/h); 75 or 100 mph (120 or 160 km/h)*; 85 mph (140 km/h)†
- Power output: Electrical: 7 MW (9,400 hp), Diesel: 1–2.8 MW (1,300–3,800 hp); 4 MW (5,400 hp) electrical, 0.7 MW (940 hp) diesel* 2.8 MW (3,800 hp) diesel †
- Tractive effort
  - Starting: 500 kN (110,000 lb_{f}); 317 kN (71,000 lb_{f})*
Career
- Operators: Direct Rail Services
- Sources = Standard design * UK locomotives † Prasa locomotives

The Stadler EuroDual (known as the Vossloh Euro Dual until 2015) is a series of dual power, electro-diesel locomotive by Stadler Rail Valencia. Unlike traditional dual mode locomotives, fitted with relatively low-powered diesel engines for 'last mile' movements only, vehicles are typically furnished with power units more comparable to that of mainline diesel locomotives.

The EuroDual series was launched by Vossloh during 2012. It shares a considerably large portion of its design with the single power Eurolight family of locomotives. Being customisable to meet customer demands, various sized powerplants can be fitted to the type; it can also be configured as a tri-mode vehicle via the installation of a battery pack. To date, there are three distinct versions of the EuroDual that have seen customer use; the UKDual for the United Kingdom, the PrasaDual for South Africa and an unbranded series for Germany. By late 2019, a total of 30 locomotives had been constructed, while a total of 74 Euro Duals were reportedly on the company's books.

== Background ==
At Innotrans 2012, Vossloh announced the launch of its range of dual mode locomotives; the company's initial offerings included the Vossloh DM30 concept based on the Vossloh DE 18, and the EuroDual locomotives derived from its diesel Euro 4000 and EuroLight classes. Specifically, the Euro Dual shares the majority of its design, including elements such as the bodyshell, braking systems, bogies, traction equipment and software, with the Eurolight series. Initial descriptions issued by Vossloh were of a Co'Co' locomotive with 5 MW electrical power and 0.7 to 2.8 MW (940 to 3,750 hp) diesel power, with an axle load from 17 to 22.5 t (16.7 to 22.1 long tons; 18.7 to 24.8 short tons). Subsequent orders differed from the initial specifications, with orders from the UK and South Africa being for Bo-Bo locomotives. At Innotrans 2018, the new Eurodual was presented by Stadler; the first two versions are marketed as UKDual and PrasaDual, while a third variant of the EuroDual featured the Co-Co wheel arrangement.

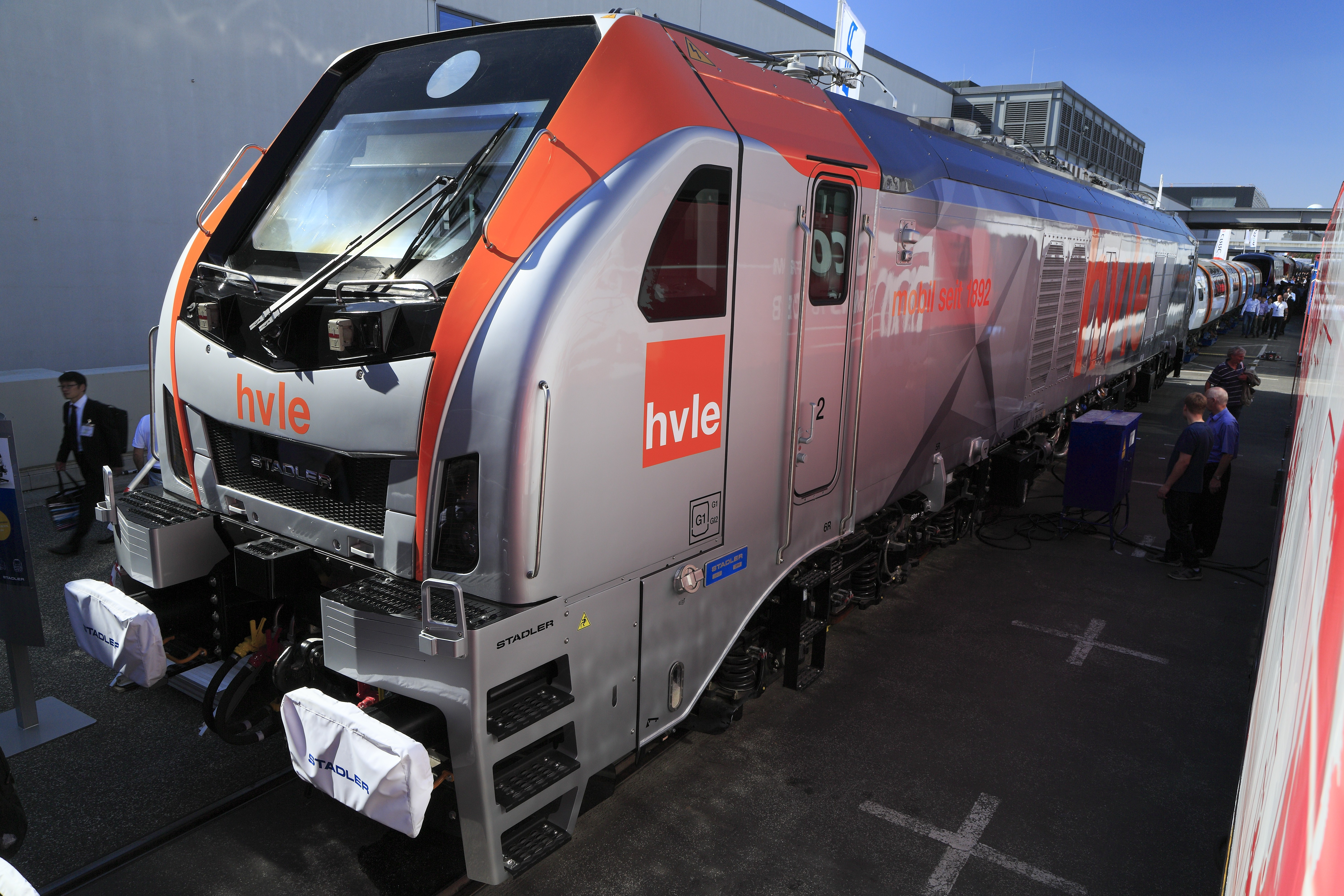
Stadler Eurodual II at 2018 InnoTrans railway fair

In comparison to historic dual mode locomotives, the Euro Dual series was not designed with a low-powered diesel powerplant intended only for 'last mile' operations with restrictive acceleration, speed, and range; rather, it was a full capable locomotive in either diesel or electric modes. It has been designed for routinely handling heavy freight consists, the series is reportedly expected to function as a dual-mode replacement for the successful Euro 4000, which will soon cease production as the latter is not compliant with European Stage IIIA emission standards. The Euro Dual is suitable for both passenger and freight applications, being able to operate at speeds of up to 160 km/h (99 mph). The market for dual mode trains is seen to be a growing one in comparison to conventional single mode diesel locomotives; by 2019, relatively few pure diesel locomotives were reportedly achieving sales.

The Euro Dual was designed from the onset as a highly modular platform, allowing it to be offered to customers in various different configurations, covering various gauges and voltage systems. Accordingly, it can be equipped with diesel engines of various power ratings, being determined by the requirements of each specific customer. Despite this customisability, many features such as the bodyshell are capable of accommodating such range with little meaningful modifications. Furthermore, some versions of the Euro Dual series are tri modes, which are capable of being powered by either overhead electrification, a diesel engine, or an array of batteries. When fitted with a battery unit, the starting power of the locomotive can be augmented beyond conventional limits, enabling trains to accelerate faster by augmenting the starting tractive effort of the diesel engine to around 500 kN. Another advantage of such a configuration is the ability to recover energy via regenerative braking, improving operational efficiency.

== Orders ==
=== United Kingdom ===
==== Direct Rail Services ====
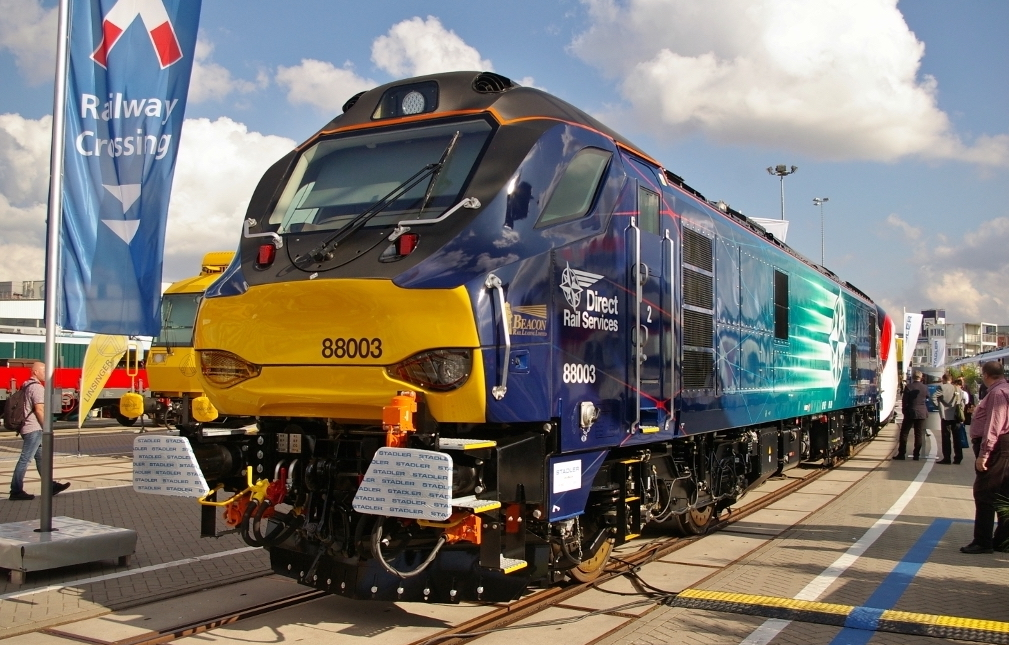
Direct Rail Services 88003 at InnoTrans fair 2016

In September 2013, UK rail operator Direct Rail Services announced it had ordered ten Euro Dual locomotives, with a 700 kW (940 hp) engine, and 4 MW rating electrical equipment (25 kV AC operation). The type was subsequently designated as the Class 88. The design is a development of the Class 68 (Stadler UKLight) diesel locomotives that Direct Rail Services introduced in 2014, having the bodyshell, cab, brakes, bogies, traction equipment and control software in common, the diesel engine is a 950 hp (710 kW) Caterpillar C27, albeit a model that conforms with the European IIIB emissions standards unlike that of the Class 68.

In April 2016, one vehicle was transferred to the Velim railway test circuit for testing.

==== Rail Operations Group ====
In January 2021, Rail Operations Group confirmed their order of 30 Class 93 locomotives, with the first ten deliveries scheduled for 2023. Unlike the earlier Class 88, these shall be tri mode vehicles furnished with a battery pack, enabling operations away from overhead catenary wires without activating the diesel engine.

==== GB Railfreight ====
On 29 April 2022, GB Railfreight announced an order for 30 new Class 99 locomotives, financed by Beacon Rail.

=== France ===
Following its use in manufacturer trials, the prototype Euro Dual was put up for sale. French operator VFLI purchased this locomotive, had it furnished with French-specific safety apparatus, and has put it into use.

=== South Africa ===
In October 2013, Swifambo Rail Leasing placed a €250 million order for 50 Euro Dual and 20 Euro 4000 diesel locomotives, to be leased to the Passenger Rail Agency of South Africa (PRASA) for use on Shosholoza Meyl services. The locomotives were configured as Bo-Bo vehicles with 2.8 MW (3,800 hp) diesel power and a top speed of 140 km/h (87 mph).

During late 2015, PRASA began proceedings in the High Court of South Africa to terminate the contract for both the Afro4000 and Euro-Dual locomotives ordered from Vossloh, and to be repaid the R2.65 billion already expended. A specific problem cited was that the supplied diesel locomotives were substantially out of gauge for parts of the network, being 4.14 m high, as opposed to a 3.965 m limit specified by the government infrastructure and logistics organisation Transnet. PRASA also claimed that Swifambo lacked the necessary experience, and or certification to be awarded the contract, and that Swifambo had failed to meet the terms of the bidding process, in that it lacked experience in the supply of railway equipment.

=== Germany ===
In 2017, private German operator Havelländische Eisenbahn (HVLE) ordered ten Euro Dual locomotives, with an option of ordering further ten, becoming the launch customer for the Euro Dual. Designated in Germany as the Class 159, these locomotives have six traction axles, a maximum continuous power of 7 MW (9,400 hp) (electric) and 3 MW (4,000 hp) (diesel); the starting traction effort can be as much as 500 kN and the maximum speed is specified with 160 km/h (100 mph). The variant features AC traction motors and separate IGBT converters for each axle. The diesel engine is a CAT C175-16 rated at 2800 kW (Stage IIIB compliant). The construction is fully TSI compliant. It features the latest ETCS Baseline 3 train protection system and legacy PZB for the German network. During 2018, the first three locomotives were delivered and began the homologation process. During May 2020, it was announced that commercial use of HVLE's Euro Dual fleet had commenced.

Stadler Eurodual 2159 of ELP in Brake (Weser)

Shortly thereafter, a major order for 30 Euro Duals, accompanied by options for 70 more, was placed by the Swiss rolling stock leasing company European Loc Pool (ELP). The first batch of ten locomotives were to be configured for use in Germany and certified for operation only within Germany (with plans to seek approval for operation in other countries, including Norway and Sweden). Their maximum speed was restricted to 120 km/h (75 mph), although with possibility of re-gearing them for 160 km/h (100 mph) if so desired by the operator.

During late 2018, another operator, ITL, placed an order for ten Euro Duals configured for use on the German railways.

=== Bolivia ===
Bolivian operator, Ferroviaria Andina ordered three Stadler SALi (South American Light Loco) locomotives derived from Euro Dual design and adapted for Bolivian metre-gauge railway, in February 2018.

=== Tanzania ===
Tanzania Railways Corporation ordered six Euro Dual locomotives for Tanzania Standard Gauge Railway in January 2020.

=== Turkey ===
In 2019, the Turkish open access operator Körfez Ulaştırma ordered seven locomotives; these are intended for 2,000 tonne oil trains in Turkey. In addition to supplying the Euro Duals themselves, Stadler is also to contracted perform all maintenance activities upon the fleet.

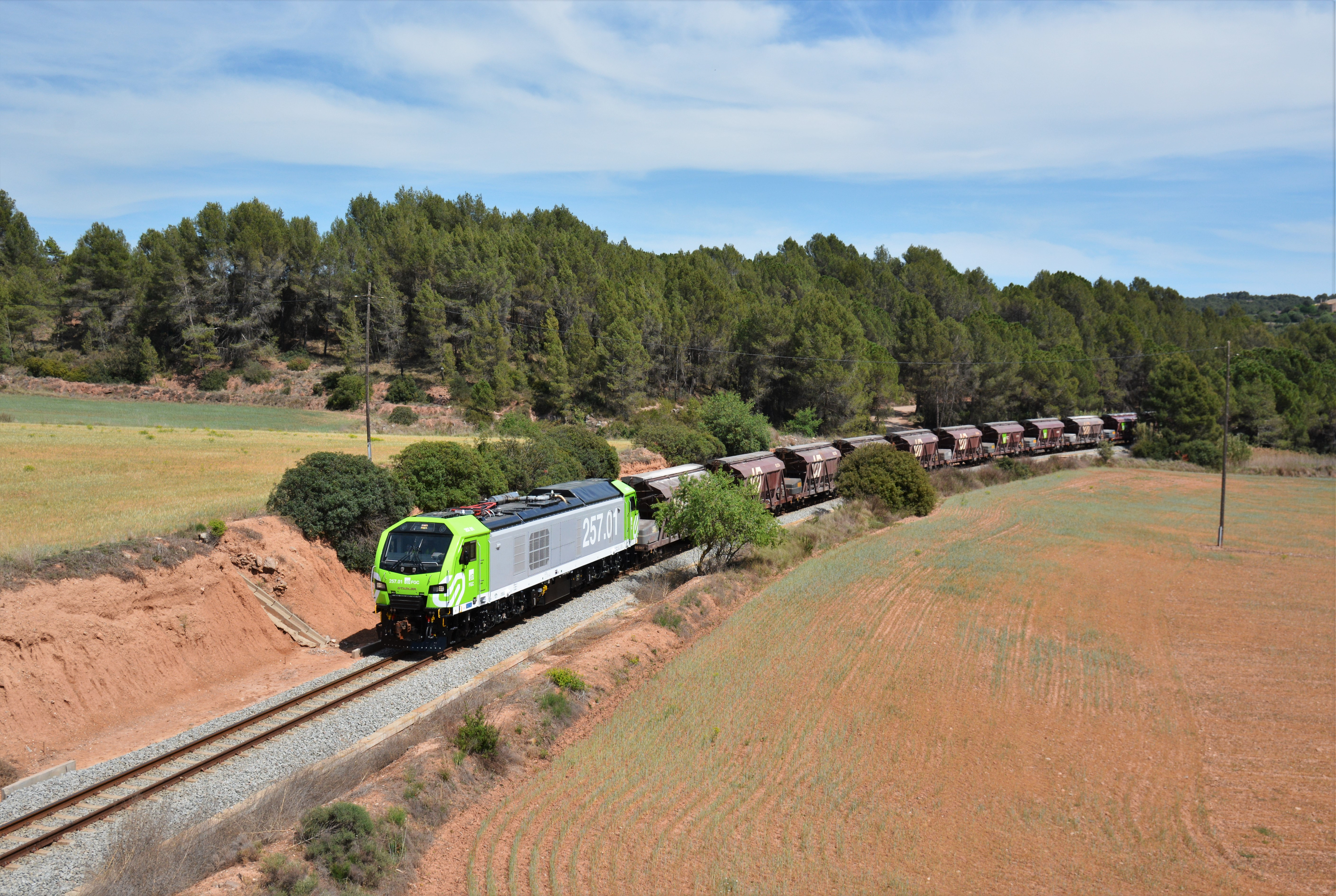
FGC 257 series transporting potash

=== Spain ===
5 locomotives based on the Bolivian SALi model were delivered to Ferrocarrils de la Generalitat de Catalunya in 2022. Built in Stadler's plant in Albuixech, they were designated as the 257 series. The metre-gauge locomotives provide freight service, transporting potash and cars in the Llobregat-Anoia line.

=== Norway ===
The Norwegian freight hauler Onrail rents two EuroDuals from European Loc Pool, starting 2022. They are intended for use in Norway, but have been used in Sweden also.

== See also ==
- Stadler Eurolight - a similar diesel locomotive
