= British Rail Class 99 =

British railway locomotive

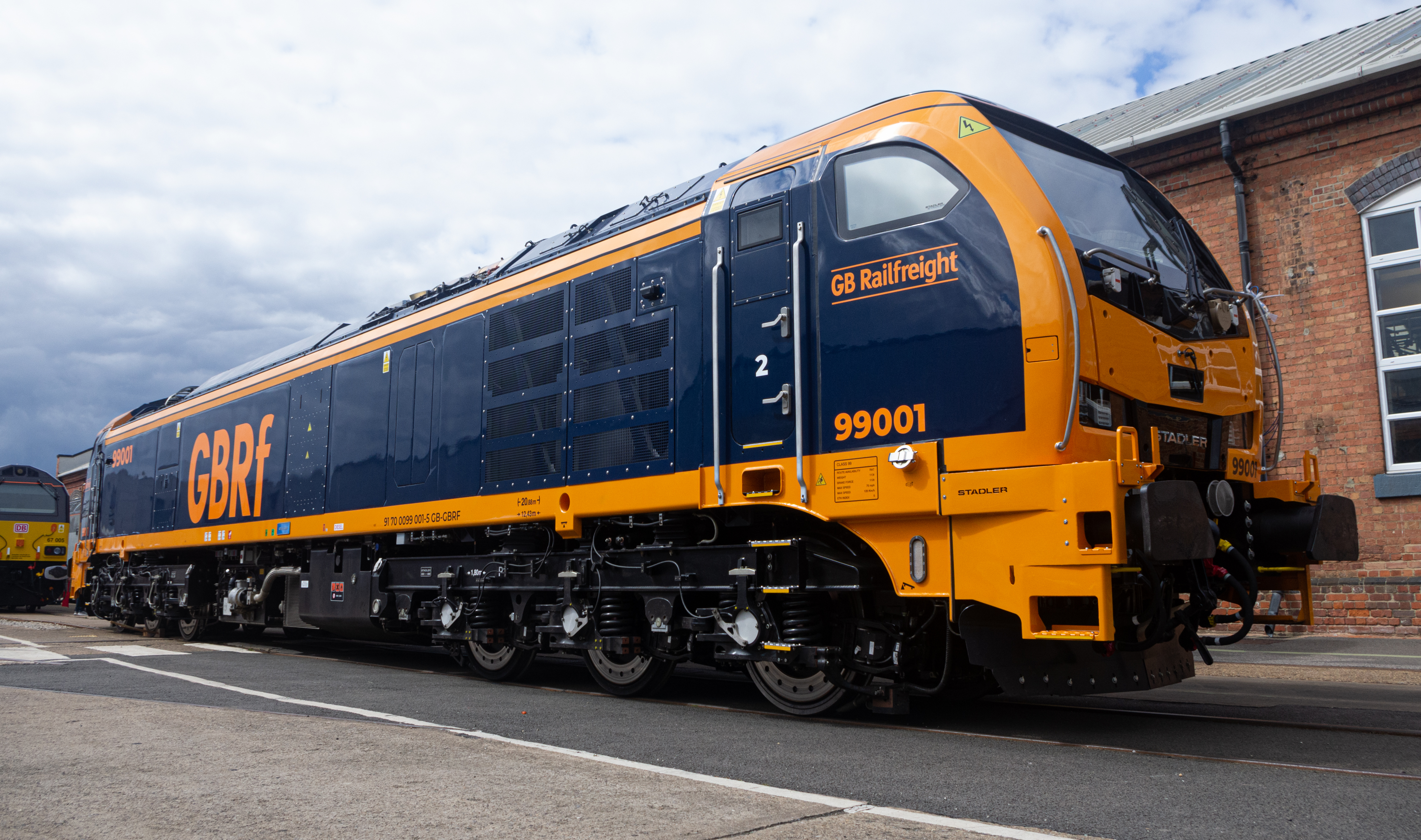
- A GB Railfreight Class 99 at The Greatest Gathering
Type and origin
- Power type: Electro-diesel
- Builder: Stadler Rail Valencia
- Total produced: 30
Specifications
- Configuration
  - UIC: Co′Co′
  - Commonwealth: Co-Co
- Gauge: 1,435 mm (4 ft 8 1/2 in)
- Loco weight: 113 t (111 long tons; 125 short tons)
- Fuel type: Diesel (HVO in service)
- Fuel capacity: 3,000 L (660 imp gal)
- Electric system/s: 25 kV 50 Hz AC
- Current pickup: Pantograph
- Prime mover: Cummins QSK50
- Engine type: Four-stroke V16 diesel
- Aspiration: Turbocharged with intercooler
- Displacement: 50.2 L (3,066.4 cu in) total
- Transmission: AC/AC
- Loco brake: Air with blending, regenerative, rheostatic
- Safety systems: AWS, TPWS
Performance figures
- Maximum speed: 75 mph (120 km/h)
- Power output: 6,170 kW (8,270 hp) (electric); 1,790 kW (2,400 hp) (diesel)
- Tractive effort
  - Starting: 500 kN (110,000 lb_{f})
  - Continuous: 430 kN (97,000 lb_{f})
Career
- Operators: GB Railfreight
- Numbers: 99 001– 99 030
- Delivered: 2025 (scheduled)
- First run: 28 July 2026
- Current owner: Beacon Rail
- Disposition: In commercial service

The British Rail Class 99 is a class of dual-mode electro-diesel Co-Co locomotives capable of hauling freight trains on both electrified and non-electrified lines. It is based on the Stadler Euro Dual platform.

As of May 2026, seven locomotives had been delivered. Following testing and training, the first commercial train movement with a class 99 locomotive took place on 28 July 2026.

== History ==
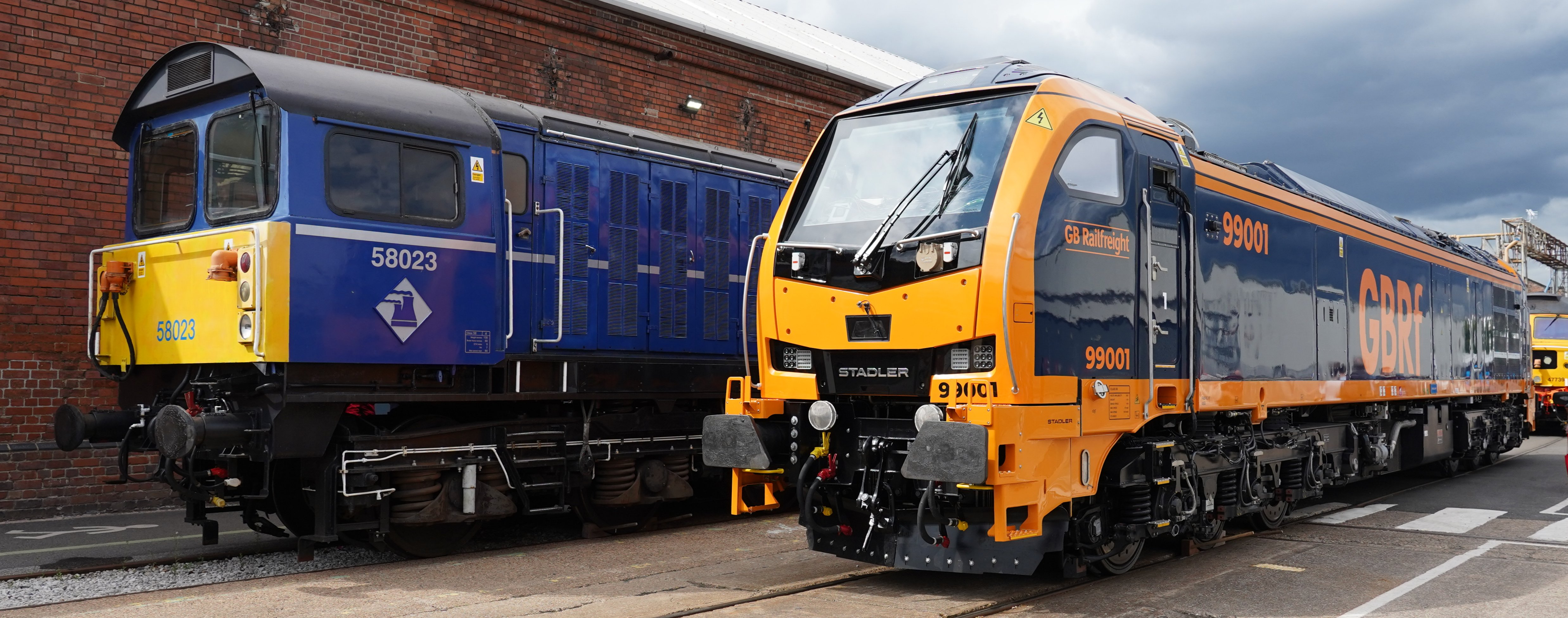
99001 on display at the Greatest Gathering, Derby Litchurch Lane Works

In April 2022, Beacon Rail and GB Railfreight signed an agreement with Stadler Rail Valencia for the supply of 30 locomotives to replace their Class 66 locomotives. The locomotives represent a £150 million investment by GBRf. The locomotives are owned by Beacon Rail, which funded their acquisition, and are leased to GBRf.

In September 2024, locomotive 99002 was displayed by GBRf at Innotrans 2024 in Berlin. Locomotive 99001 underwent testing at the Velim test centre in the Czech Republic from January 2025. The first two units arrived in the UK on 10 June 2025 at the port of Bristol and underwent further testing in Leicester.

All 30 locomotives were initially expected to be in service by June 2026, however this was slightly delayed due to flooding in Valencia affecting Stadler's factory in October 2024.

The first two units were delivered to GB Railfreight in July 2025. The Class 99 was approved for service in the UK by the ORR in October 2025. As of May 2026, seven locomotives had been delivered and driver training was taking place.

The first commercial service took place on 28 July 2026 from London Gateway to Hams Hall Rail Freight Terminal.

== Specification ==
The 75 mph (120 km/h) locomotive has a maximum tractive effort of 500 kN (110,000 lb_{f}), and a power rating of 6,170 kW (8,270 hp) in electric mode. These figures exceed those of the diesel-powered British Rail Class 66.

It is fitted with the AWS and TPWS safety systems, and is planned to be fitted with ETCS. It has cameras providing views of the pantographs, shunting zones and the front of the locomotive.

=== Diesel performance ===
The Class 99 locomotive has a 16-cylinder 1,790 kW (2,400 hp) Cummins QSK50 engine installed, which meets Stage 5 emissions standards. The locomotives are expected to use HVO biofuels in service, and will be able to raise and lower their pantographs while moving.

Peter Dearman, an expert in traction electrification, reported in Rail Engineer in early 2023 that the Class 99 may only be able to deliver 1,600 kW (2,100 hp) at the rail in diesel mode. However, this was before the first production locomotive was exhibited at InnoTrans in September 2024.

The chief executive of GBRf, John Smith, reports that the Class 99 will outperform the Class 66 at low speeds, despite having a less powerful diesel engine. The greater tractive effort means that the Class 99 on diesel power can deliver more power at the rail than the 66. The less powerful diesel engine is also not expected to change its use cases, and will be deployed on heavy haul routes and intermodal trains.

== Planned use ==
The locomotives, which entered revenue-generating service in the summer of 2026, are likely to be used primarily for intermodal work on the West Coast and the Great Eastern mainlines.

In July 2025, GBRf reached an agreement with Belmond to introduce Class 99 locomotives from 2027 to haul the luxury Royal Scotsman and Britannic Explorer trains, replacing the current Class 66 fleet to improve sustainability.

They are maintained by Stadler at a new facility in Leicester.

In October 2026, RAIL reported that a further 13 Class 99s are to be ordered for Caledonian Sleeper work, to replace Class 66, 73 and 92 locomotives currently used. They will be given a higher top speed of 100mph and Electric Train Supply (ETS) for providing power to the carriages.

== See also ==
- British Rail Class 93 (Stadler)
