= Stadler Eurolight =

Diesel-electric locomotive

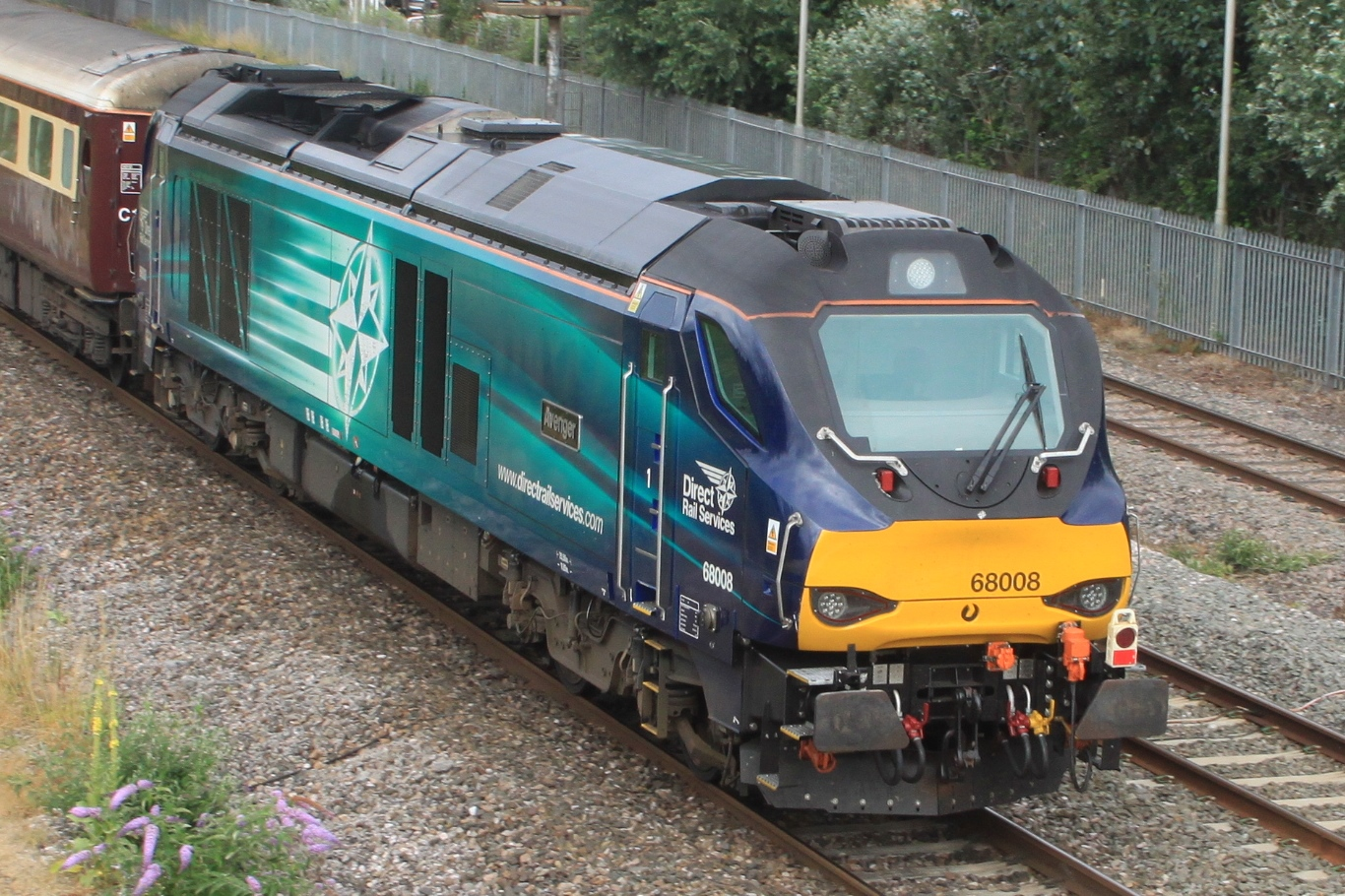
- Class 68 locomotive of Direct Rail Services, UK
Type and origin
- Power type: Diesel
- Builder: Vossloh España (2010–2015); Stadler Rail Valencia (2016–)
Specifications
- Configuration
  - UIC: Bo'Bo'
- Gauge: 1,435 mm (4 ft 8 1/2 in)
- Wheel diameter: 1,100 mm (3 ft 7 in)
- Minimum curve: 80 m (262 ft)
- Length: 20.32 m (66 ft 8 in)
- Height: 4.26 m (14 ft 0 in)
- Axle load: ‡ RA7
- Loco weight: 77.5 t (76.3 long tons; 85.4 short tons) (2/3rd full) 16-cylinder 75.5 t (74.3 long tons; 83.2 short tons) (2/3 full) 12-cylinder 85 t (84 long tons; 94 short tons)‡
- Fuel capacity: 4,000 L (880 imp gal; 1,100 US gal) l 5,000 L (1,100 imp gal; 1,300 US gal) ‡
- Electric system/s: AC/AC transmission with four ABB Bordline CC1500 traction inverters
- Engine type: Caterpillar Inc. C175
- Alternator: ABB WGX560PB6
- Traction motors: Four ABB 4FRA6063 (600 kW (800 hp))
- Head end power: 500 kW (670 hp) (passenger version)
- Loco brake: Disc brake, Electropneumatic, also Dynamic (electrical) 2.1 MW (2,800 hp)
Performance figures
- Maximum speed: 120 km/h (75 mph) (freight); 140–200 km/h (87–124 mph) (passenger); 160 km/h (99 mph)‡
- Power output: 2.8 MW (3,800 hp) @1,800 rpm (16-cylinder engine) ‡ 2.3 MW (3,100 hp) @1,800 rpm (12-cylinder engine)
- Tractive effort: 300 kN (67,000 lbf) (starting); 317 kN (71,000 lbf) (starting)‡
- Sources: ‡ UKLight.: Figures refer to european UIC 505-1 version unless noted

The Stadler Eurolight (known as the Vossloh Eurolight until 2015) is the brand name for a family of 4-axle Bo'Bo' mainline diesel-electric locomotives with sub-20-tonne axleloads for passenger and freight trains produced by Stadler Rail.

The Eurolight series was announced by Vossloh during 2009, the first examples were completed and commenced testing in the following year. The type has been intentionally developed to support use on secondary lines without limiting power or speed performances, making it suitable for mixed traffic operations. Specific versions of the Eurolight have been developed for the United Kingdom market, and a 6-axle Co'Co' machine for narrow gauge Asian markets, named UKLight and AsiaLight respectively. Furthermore, an electro-diesel locomotive derivative of the UKLight that shares much of its design, referred to as the Stadler Euro Dual, has also been developed and introduced during the late 2010s.

== Background and design ==
In 2009, Vossloh announced its intention to expand its diesel locomotive range to include further shunting/light mainline locomotives with either hydraulic or electric transmissions, and to produce a mainline diesel-electric locomotive (EURO Light) for markets where an axleload below 20 t is required. The four-axle EuroLight was designed to have a low axle load for use on cross-border operations on non-electrified European secondary routes, enabling operators to bypass bottlenecks on main corridors. It is reportedly suited for mixed-traffic operations, and can be outfitted to haul both passenger services and freight consists alike.

The locomotive used numerous components from the 20–22 t axleload Vossloh Euro locomotive series. Differences include the adoption of a C175 engine from Caterpillar Inc. (12- or 16-cylinder of 2.3 or 2.8 MW) and traction equipment supplied by ABB Group. In comparison to the Vossloh Euro, a noticeable reduction in mass was achieved, which has been attributed to the adoption of a lighter engine/alternator set, as well as using lighter weight auxiliary system components. The bogie is the design used in the Renfe Class 334 locomotive, with coil spring primary and secondary suspension. Wherever feasible, elements of the engine and traction system are composed of lighter aluminium rather than steel.

For greater efficiency, the CAT engine has been furnished with electronically regulated fuel injectors, enabling it to be precisely tuned to match the demands being placed on the engine at that time; factors taken into account include load, speed, engine temperature, ambient air temperature, and fuel temperature. For further fuel savings, automated stop-start technology has been incorporated to shut the engine down at times of inactivity and restart when required or to keep coolant temperatures above a set threshold; this behaviour can be manually overridden by the driver if desired. It is also equipped with turbochargers and after-cooling apparatus. The engine incorporates its own telemetry equipment, separate from the general system used by the locomotive; these systems aid in performance analysis and fault reporting. It is reportedly to be serviceable at trackside locations and requires a major service to be performed at intervals of 18,000 operating hours, reducing the need for the locomotive to return to the operator's depots.

The CAT engine conform to European Stage IIIA emission standards, and can be modified to meet 2012 IIIB emission standards by replacing the exhaust silencer with a diesel particulate filter. Implementing such equipment in some regions can be complicated by the need to adhere to restrictive loading gauges, such as that predominantly used in the United Kingdom; accordingly extensive redesigning may be required. Both the engine and traction apparatus are frame mounted to reduce unsprung mass, being typically fitted using a five-point flexible mounting system, the mounting points of which being intentionally isolated.

The ABB traction system uses a six-pole brushless WGX560 synchronous alternator, which is directly coupled to the CAT engine. The alternator supplies two traction packages (ABB Bordline CC1500 DE Compact Converters) each with rectifier to create an intermediate DC supply, braking chopper, and drive electronics (AC800 PEC) with adhesion (anti slip) control controlling two traction inverters and one auxiliary inverter per package. There is one traction inverter per traction motor. The traction motors are rated at 600 kW (800 hp) at 4,400 rpm. The drive electronics incorporate features such as fault condition detection and anti-slip control to maximise wheel adhesion to the rails, the latter being augmented by an automated sanding system. Head end power (for passenger versions) is taken from the intermediate DC link; the DC power system which is also used for dynamic braking. The braking systems typically used are a combination of rheostatic and disc brakes.

The first EuroLight was unveiled at the InnoTrans trade fair in Berlin in 2010. From the onset, the design was designed to be customisable to customer requirements, allowing for a variants with a higher top speed, increased fuel capacity, or compatibility with limited loading gauges to be produced. Modified versions for broad and narrow gauge railways, and a long distance 7,000-litre (1,500 imp gal; 1,800 US gal) fuel capacity version are also said to be buildable. An electro-diesel locomotive derivative, referred to as the Stadler Euro Dual, has also been developed; it shares most of its design, such as the bodyshell, braking systems, bogies, traction equipment and software, with vehicles of the Stadler Eurolight series.

== Versions ==
=== European mainland - EuroLight ===
During early 2010, a pair of prototypes were constructed, numbered 248.001 and 248.002. That same year, 248.002 was publicly exhibited at Innotrans. Homologation tests with 248.001 in Germany began in January 2011. Performance data gathered from these prototypes was subsequently made available to prospective operators to aid in evaluating the EuroLight's capabilities.

During July 2015, the Italian operator Dinazzano Po ordered a single unit; the locomotive performed its maiden freight service during April 2018. On 31 July 2019, it was announced that the Spanish railway infrastructure company ADIF had ordered 22 Eurolight locomotives for rescue purposes; these vehicles are compliance with the European Stage IIIB emissions standards and feature a facelift over earlier production examples.

=== United Kingdom - UKLight ===
On 5 January 2012, Direct Rail Services announced an order for fifteen 160 km/h (100 mph) EuroLight UK locos for intermodal and passenger work with a 2.8 MW (3,800 hp) C175-16 engine to be delivered in 2013, with options for more. Vossloh's product name for the design is UKLIGHT. They were designed to fit the small loading gauge in the UK, and were manufactured at Vossloh España's plant in Valencia, Spain, with an expected delivery date of late 2013. They are known in the United Kingdom as the class 68. The value of the contract has been estimated at £45 million.

During early 2013, the design and livery of the Direct Rail Services' class 68s was publicly unveiled. By May 2013, the first of the locomotives was under construction, at which point testing at Velim test track and delivery to UK for certification was anticipated to occur around September/October 2013; By December 2013, number 68001 had commenced tests at Velim, and 68002 had been completed at Albuixech.

During January 2014, the first locomotive, designated as 68002 Intrepid, was shipped to Southampton and transported to Carlisle; trials commenced one month later, which were initially conducted between Carlisle and Crewe. In September 2014, an option for ten further UKLights was confirmed to have been taken up by DRS/BeaconRail. Seven more units were confirmed as ordered in July 2015.

=== Asia - AsiaLight ===
A narrow gauge, 1,000 mm (3 ft 3 3/8 in) to 1,067 mm (3 ft 6 in), six axle Co'Co' design has also been developed. In a typical configuration, this locomotive weighs around 96 tons and has an engine power output of 1,800 to 2,800 kW (2,400 to 3,800 hp) at 1,800 rpm, depending on engine installed (either 12- or 16-cylinder engines, either CAT, Cummins or MTU designs). The top speed is 120 km/h (75 mph) and starting tractive effort 320 kN (72,000 lb_{f}).

During October 2019, the Taiwan Railway Administration awarded a €165M order to supply 34 AsiaLight locomotives; the deal was Stadler's first major tender win in the Asia Pacific region. These locomotives, known as the Taiwan Railway R200, began to arrive in Taiwan in 2023.

== See also ==
- Vossloh Euro Dual - A similar electro-diesel locomotive.
