= Belmond Royal Scotsman =

Scottish overnight luxury train service

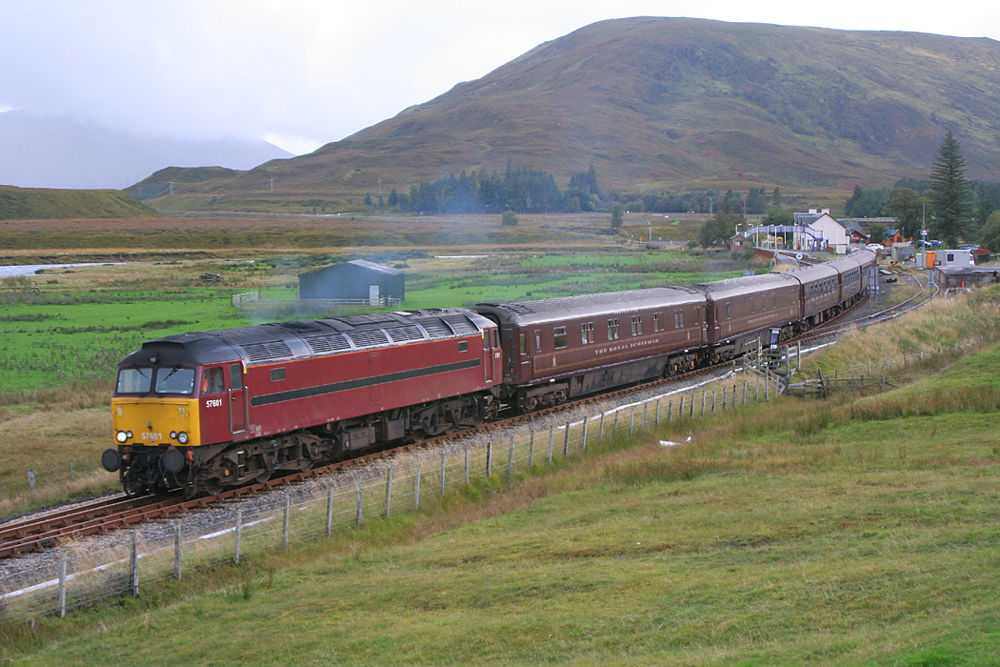
Achnasheen Station

The Belmond Royal Scotsman is a Scottish overnight luxury train, started in 1985 by GS&WR (Great Scottish and Western Railway Co.), and run since 2005 by Belmond Ltd. Its itineraries include 2-, 3-, 4-, 5- or 7-night journeys around the Scottish Highlands, visiting castles, distilleries and historic sites. Once each year, it also makes a 7-night journey around the whole of Great Britain.

== Train's history ==
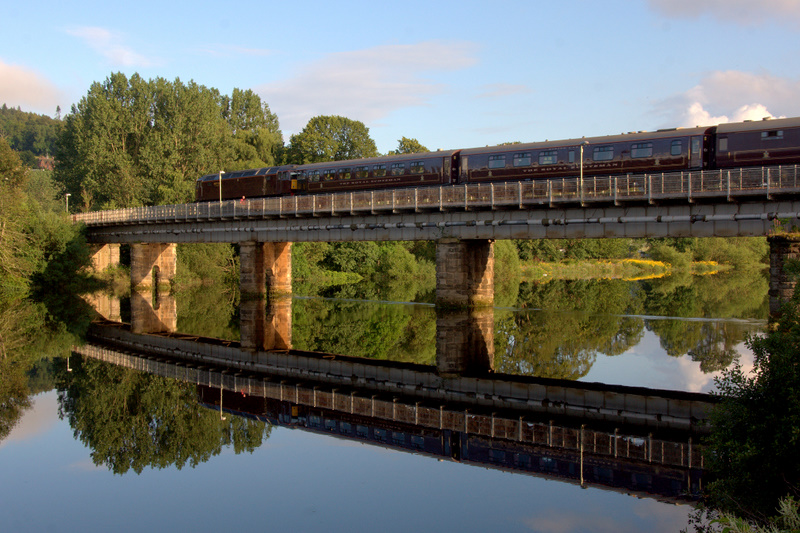
Crossing the bridge over the River Tay at Perth

The first train was composed of Mark 1 sleeping cars and three vintage dining and lounge carriages. After the inauguration of the current train set in 1990, the vintage coaches have kept on running as the Queen of Scots charter train.

For the second train batch the train's former owner acquired Pullman cars, which were built in 1960 by Metropolitan Cammell for the East Coast Main Line. This train consisted of four sleeping cars, two dining cars, one observation car, one crew car and one generator car.

The MK1 crew car 99987, and the MK1 generator car 99966 were replaced in 1996 with two MK3 SLEP vehicles, 99968 and 99969. Each vehicle has a generator with 99968 also having two double guest cabins and crew cabins toilet and shower, 99969 crew cabins, toilets, showers and a mess area.

The train's two dining cars have been replaced over the years. Dining Car 1, which used to be a Gresley kitchen car, was damaged in a shunting incident at Millerhill depot and, as a wooden (Teak) bodied vehicle was deemed unsafe to continue passenger operations, it was withdrawn from mainline service. It was followed in 1992 by Pullman car Raven, acquired at the same time as the others in the train. Dining Car 2 used to be 99131, an ex-LNER SC1999 coach named Victory. It was replaced by the Pullman car Swift, which was acquired in 2011 and converted by Assenta Rail in Scotland. On 9 August 2011, the train hosted the very first wedding on an Orient Express train.

Belmond acquired another Pullman coach in 2015 from CRRES (West Coast Railway Co Ltd) and again employed Assenta Rail to undertake outfitting and project management in order to create "State car - SPA". After provisional mechanical and body works at CRRES the coach was shipped to Mivan Marine in Antrim, where it was outfitted with two Bamford SPA rooms and 2 additional bedrooms (1 PRM Twin and 1 Double) with inter-connection. Upon completion the carriage was taken back to CRRES for final mechanical works and entry into the rolling stock library as 99337. The carriage entered service in September 2016.

Following an announcement in March 2023, a new accommodation category, Grand Suite, was launched in May 2024. Similar to their namesakes on the Venice-Simplon Orient Express, the two compartments feature double beds and a drawing saloon with a sofa. For this a new State Car 1 was converted from another Pullman car, Kitchen First 316 Magpie. It replaced the previous State Car 1 (ex Pullman Parlour First 324 Amber) in late April 2024. In 2025, State Car 4 (ex Pullman Parlour First 313 Finch) was also replaced by the refitted Pullman Kitchen First 315 Heron, which has also meant the introduction of two more Grand Suites and the abandoning of the Single cabins. From April 2027 another category named as Suite may become available.

== Current train fleet ==
Carriage	Current number	Former number and name	Layout
Observation Lounge Car	99965	Pullman Kitchen First E319 Snipe	Loose chairs and sofas with coffee tables, bar, outside observation platform
Dining Car 1	99967	Pullman Kitchen First E317 Raven	20-seat dining saloon, kitchen
Dining Car 2	99960	Pullman Kitchen First E321 Swift	20-seat dining saloon, pantry, cellar, linen closet, managers office.
State Car - Spa	99337	Pullman Kitchen Second E337	Two spa rooms, a double cabin and a PRM-accessible Twin cabin with inter-connection
State Car No. 1	316	Pullman Kitchen First E316 Magpie	Two grand suites and a double cabin
State Car No. 2	99962	Pullman Parlour First E329 Pearl	Four twin cabins
State Car No. 3	99963	Pullman Parlour First E331 Topaz	Four twin cabins
State Car No. 4	315	Pullman Kitchen First E315 Heron	Two grand suites and a double cabin
State Car No. 5	99968	10541 (Mk III Sleeper) SLEP	Two double cabins, staff sleeping cabins, staff toilet and shower, generator
Service Car	99969	10556 (Mk III Sleeper) SLEP	Staff sleeping cabins, staff toilets and showers, staff mess, generator

The train length is 675 feet (206 m) without locos.

== Haulage ==
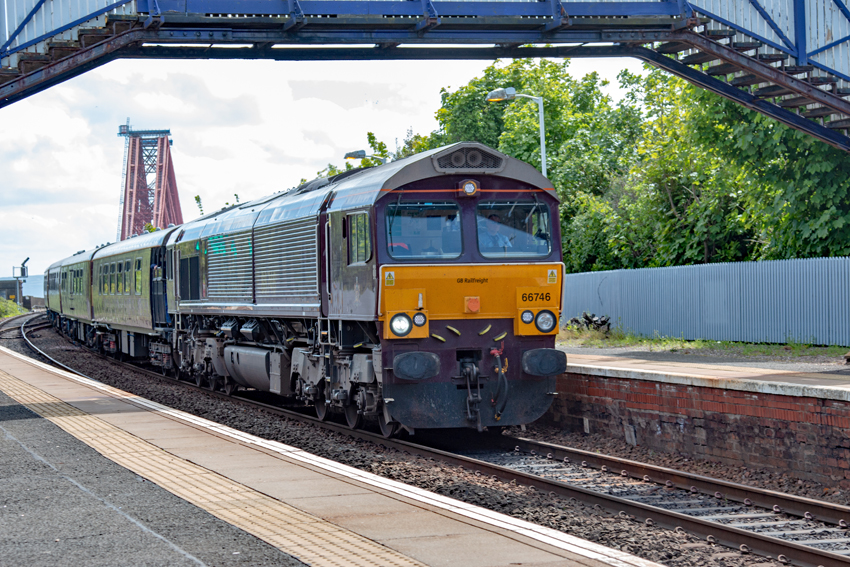
66746 hauling the Belmond Royal Scotsman through North Queensferry

Until 2015, the Royal Scotsman motive power was provided by West Coast Railways, usually using Class 37, Class 47 or Class 57 diesel locomotives.

For the 2016 season, the haulage contract was taken over by GB Railfreight. Two of their Class 66 locomotives, 66743 and 66746, being dedicated to the train. These were repainted into Belmond Royal Scotsman maroon livery with appropriate decals in April/May 2016, the work being carried out by Arlington Fleet Services at Eastleigh Works in Hampshire. 66746 appeared first, being released on 11 April with 66743 following on 30 May.

In July 2025 Belmond and GBRf have agreed, to use from 2027 the Class 99 dual-mode locomotives for sustainability reasons.

== Related trains ==
The train was a definite inspiration for Belmond's other luxury service Grand Hibernian which entered in service in August 2016 for trips in Ireland and Northern Ireland but ceased in February 2021. The train was made of Irish Mark 3 carriages, including five sleeping cars, two restaurant cars and an observation car, featuring a very similar composition and carriage layouts to the Royal Scotsman.

The carriages left Ireland in 2022, and Belmond planned to relocate the train to a new place inside Europe. It has been realized in shape of the new service Britannic Explorer, which had its first ride in July 2025, featuring round trips from London to Cornwall, Wales and The Lake District. Like the latest improvements of Royal Scotsman, the train has Grand Suite compartments and a room for wellness treatments.
