= Caterpillar C175 =

Overview
- Manufacturer: Caterpillar Incorporated

Layout
- Configuration: V16; V20
- Displacement: 5,289 cubic centimetres (322.8 in^{3}) per cylinder
- Cylinder bore: 175 millimetres (6.890 in)
- Piston stroke: 220 millimetres (8.661 in)
- Valvetrain: Side camshaft, 4 valves per cylinder
- Compression ratio: 15.3:1

RPM range
- Idle speed: 500
- Max. engine speed: 2100 (Note: Derived from governed RPM times overspeed capability given in spec sheet.)

Combustion
- Turbocharger: Double or Quad
- Fuel system: Common Rail/EUI™
- Management: Electronic (ACERT) with mechanical failsafe
- Fuel type: Diesel
- Oil system: Wet sump
- Cooling system: Water cooled

Output
- Power output: up to 4,000 kilowatts (5,364 hp) @ 1800 rpm (marine/military rating)
- Torque output: 9,260 newton-metres (6,830 lbf⋅ft) @ 1500 rpm

Dimensions
- Dry weight: up to 10.45 tonnes (10.285 long tons; 11.519 short tons)

Emissions
- Emissions target standard: EPA Tier 4 Final or IMO III
- Emissions control systems: Exhaust gas recirculation

Chronology
- Predecessor: Caterpillar 3500 series engine

The Caterpillar C175 is a family of diesel internal combustion engines made by Caterpillar. The engine is 5.3 litres per cylinder in displacement. The cylinder size is 175 millimetres (6.9 in) x 220 millimetres (8.7 in) bore/stroke. The engine can produce 1500-4800 horsepower at 1800 RPM. The peak torque occurs at an engine speed of 1500 RPM. The engine weighs over ten tonsnes. The Cat C175 is often used in locomotives, passenger-class ships and Caterpillar haul trucks like the 793F and 797F.

== Sample Applications ==
- EMD F125
- Caterpillar 797F
- Stadler Eurolight (including British Rail Class 68)
- Stadler Euro Dual (e.g. as German "Class 159" for European Loc Pool)
- Stadler Euro 4001
- CSR SDA3 (Thailand)

== See also ==
- SEMT Pielstick PA4 series engine
- MTU V4000 engine
- Cummins QSK95
- Mitsubishi SR2-PTA series engine
