= DE18 =

DE18 may refer to:

- Delaware Route 18
- USS Gilmore (DE-18)
- Vossloh DE 18, a diesel-electric locomotive
