= FGC 257 Series =

Freight locomotive

257 Series
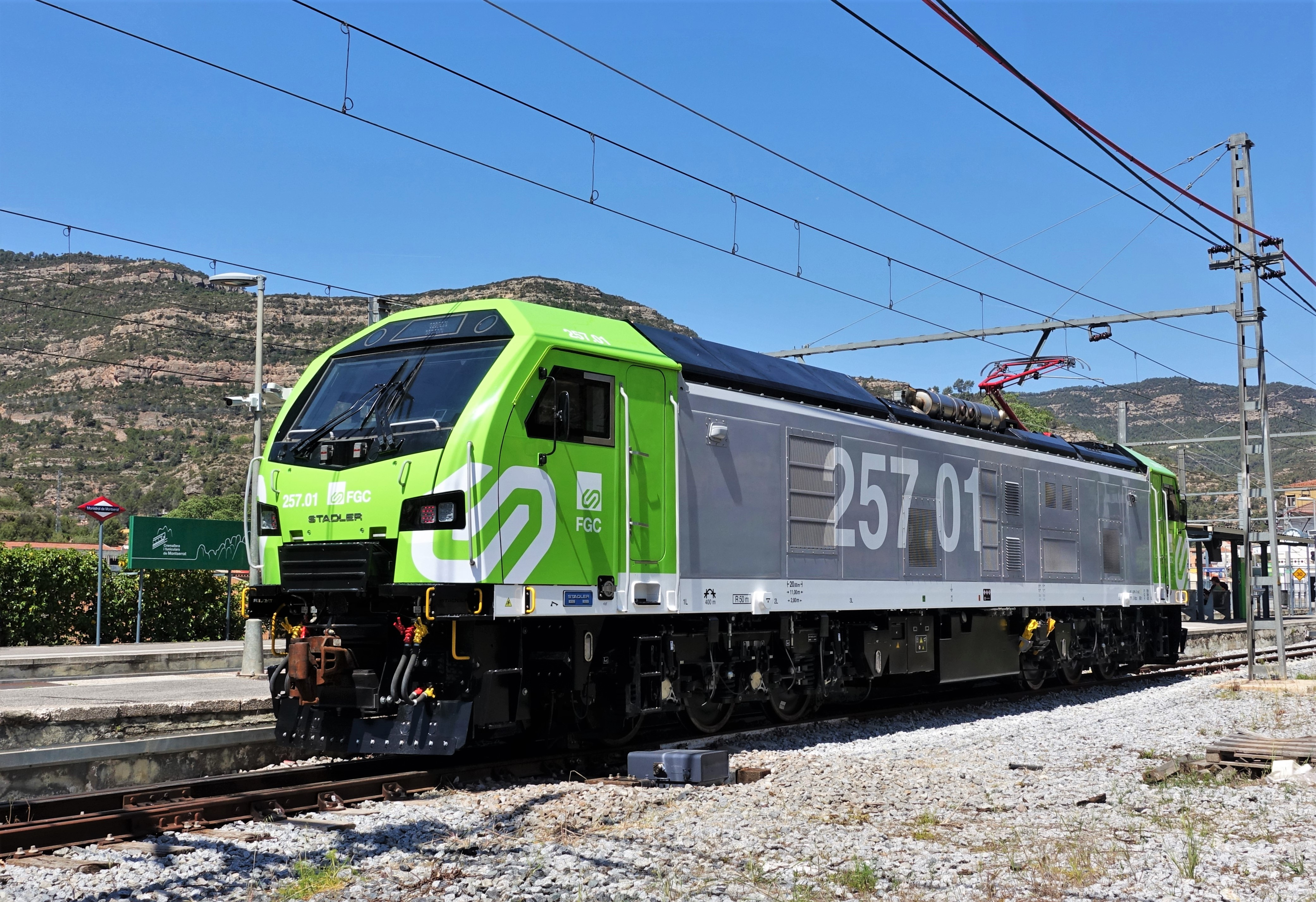
- FGC 257.01 at Monistrol de Montserrat
Type and origin
- Power type: Electro-diesel
- Builder: Stadler Rail Valencia SAU
- Total produced: 5
Specifications
- Configuration
  - UIC: Co'Co'
- Gauge: 1,000 mm (3 ft 3 3/8 in)
- Length: 20.008 m (65 ft 7.7 in)..
- Width: 2.852 m (9 ft 4.3 in)
- Height: 3.879 m (12 ft 8.7 in)
- Loco weight: 90 t
- Fuel capacity: 4000l
- Engine type: CAT C32
- Transmission: electrical AC/AC type
Performance figures
- Maximum speed: 80 km/h (50 mph)
- Power output: 2000 kW (Electric) 950 kW (Diesel)

The 257 Series is a meter gauge freight electro-diesel locomotive based on Stadler Rail's Euro Dual series. It is operated by Ferrocarrils de la Generalitat de Catalunya (FGC) in the Llobregat-Anoia line.

== Background ==
The locomotive was commissioned to replace and expand the freight service operated by the aging 254 series. Five locomotives were built in Stadler Valencia's production plant in Albuixech, Valencia. They were delivered in 2022 and entered service in 2023. While originally delivered in a red livery, the locomotives were repainted green to match FGC's corporate identity. The locomotive is based on the Stadler SALi (South American Light Loco), a version of the Euro Dual for a meter gauge railway operated by Ferroviaria Andina in Bolivia.

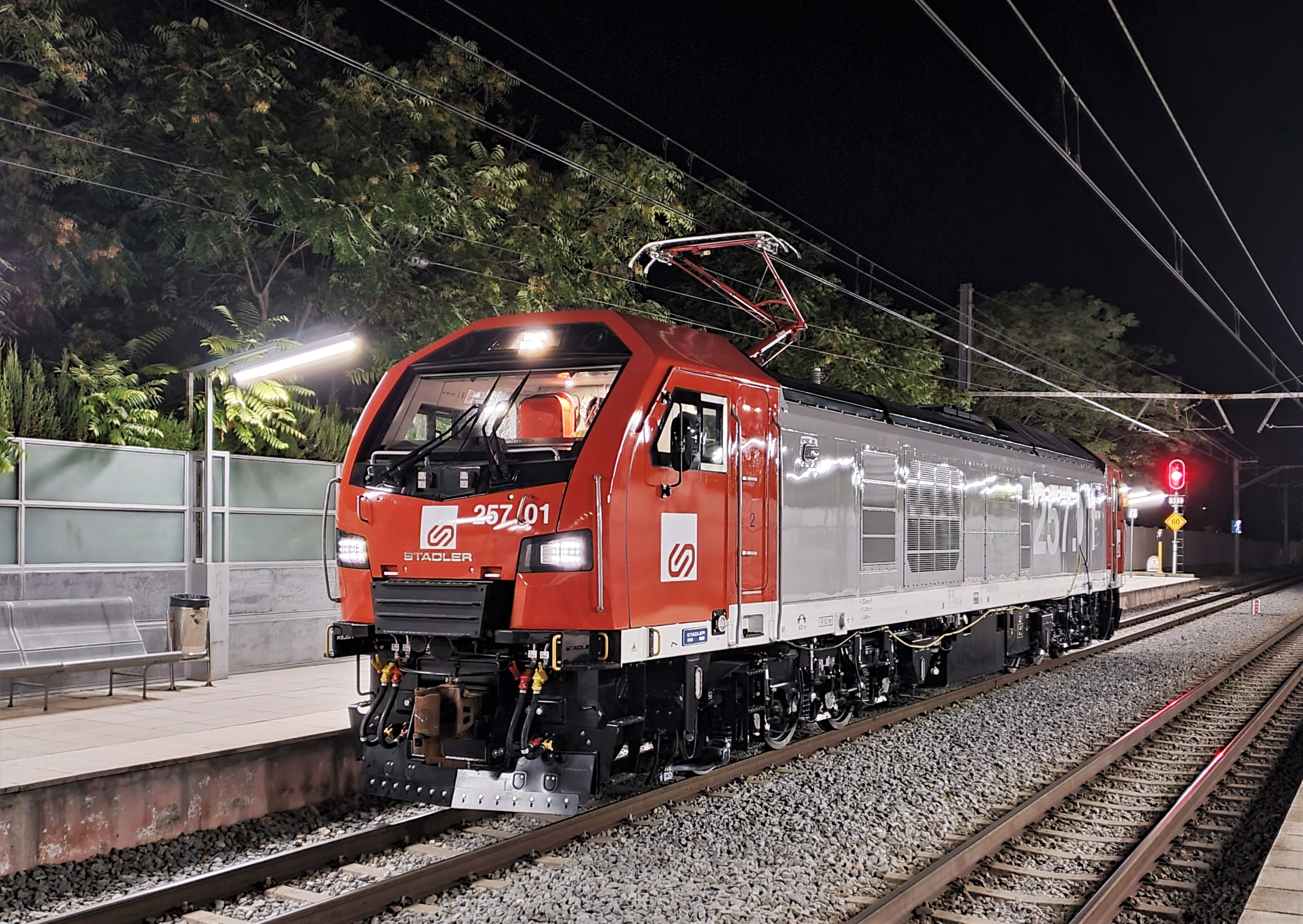
257.01 in its original red livery

The locomotives are used to haul two main types of cargo: potash and salt trains from the Súria mines and cars from the SEAT factory in Martorell, along the Llobregat–Anoia Line to the port of Barcelona.

The dual power technology of the 257 series allows trains to draw power from the 1500V catenary used by commuter trains (FGC 213 Series) in the mainline tracks between Sant Boi and Manresa while operating as a diesel train in the non-electrified industrial branches.
