= Belmond Britannic Explorer =

Luxury sleeper train

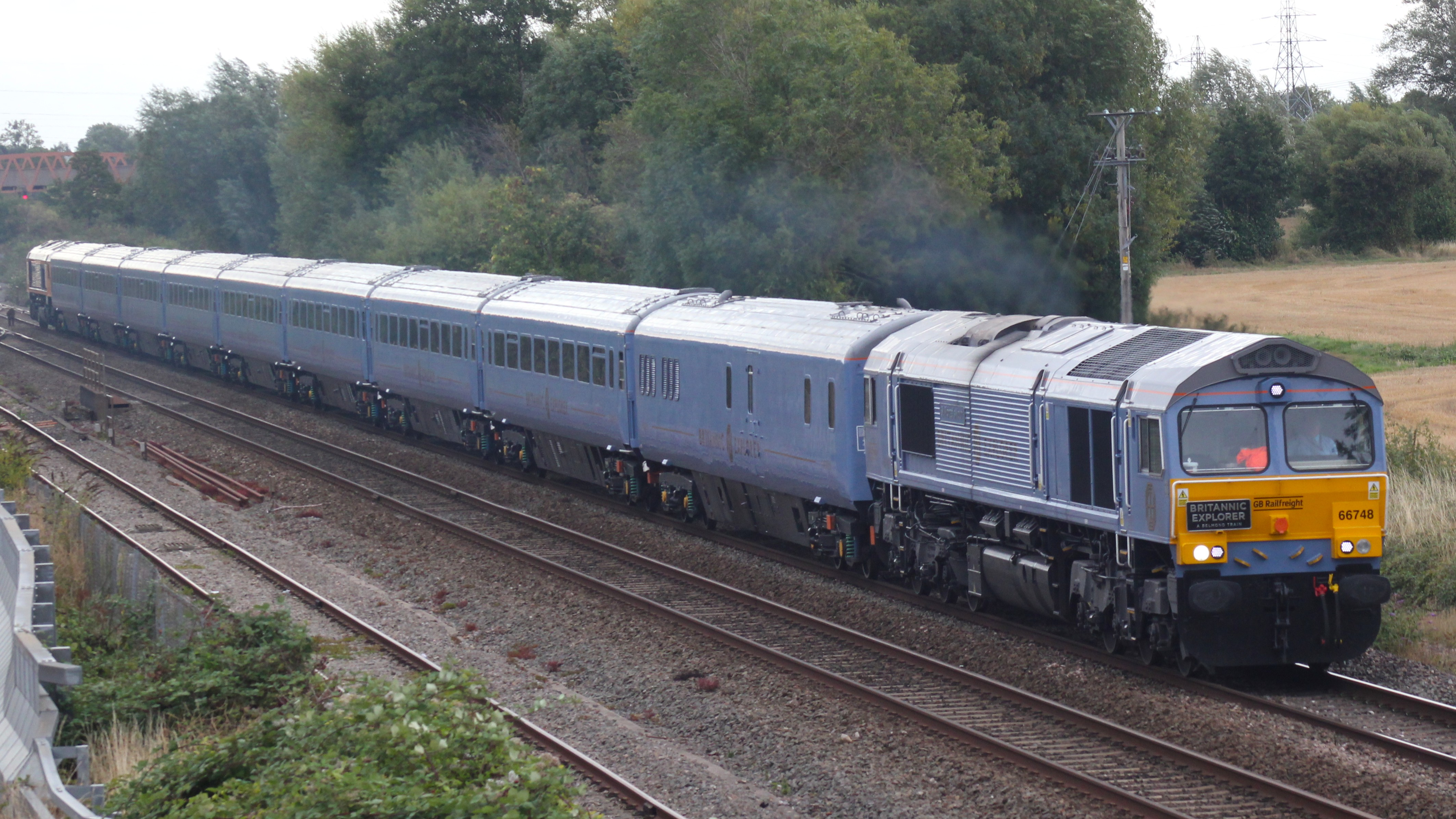
Class 66 locomotive with a nine car test run

The Belmond Britannic Explorer is a luxury sleeper train, launched in the United Kingdom in July 2025. It is owned and operated by the Belmond hospitality and leisure company, although haulage is sub-contracted to GB Railfreight (GBRf).

Since 2019, Belmond has been owned by LVMH, the luxury goods conglemorate that also owns, amongst many other companies, Moët & Chandon, Hennessy and Louis Vuitton. Belmond also runs a number of similar luxury sleeper trains, including the Venice Simplon-Orient-Express, the Royal Scotsman, the Eastern & Oriental Express and the Andean Explorer.

The Britannic Explorer uses the rolling stock of the former Grand Hibernian luxury train, which ran in Ireland and Northern Ireland between 2016 and 2019. This rolling stock was in turn rebuilt from carriages that were used on inter-city trains in Ireland between 1984 and 2009.

== History ==
The coaches that make up the Britannic Explorer are Irish Mark 3 carriages, a variant of the British Rail Mark 3 carriage design. These were originally built by British Rail Engineering Limited, at Litchurch Lane Works in Derby, for Córas Iompair Éireann (CIÉ), between 1980 and 1989. They principally differed from their British equivalents in that they were built to Ireland's 5 ft 3 in (1,600 mm) gauge. They were used by CIÉ on inter-city trains in Ireland until they were withdrawn in 2009.

Eleven of these coaches were subsequently acquired by Belmond and ten of them were rebuilt to form the new Grand Hibernian train, whilst the eleventh was broken up for parts. The carriages underwent extensive engineering redesign and overhaul by Assenta Rail and were refurbished by the company in 2015 at a cost of £7 million. Internal fitting was carried out in Antrim, by Mivan. The Grand Hibernian was officially launched on 30 August 2016.

On 18 February 2021, it was announced that the operation of the Grand Hibernian would be permanently ended, due to the COVID-19 pandemic. The train had last run on 14 October 2019 and was suspended for all of 2020 owing to the pandemic. The carriages left Ireland in 2022, and were stored in Great Britain until refurbishment started for use on the Brittanic Explorer.

The layout of the carriages were mainly kept during this second refit for this train. However, one sleeping car was remodeled with Grand Suite compartments - a comfort class featured also in Belmond's other overnight luxury trains - and in another one a compartment for spa treatments of the British wellbeing brand Wildsmith. The new interior design was created by Albion Nord. In order to run on the British standard gauge rail network, the trains were regauged using second hand bogies sourced from scrapped Greater Anglia Mark 3 carriages.

== Itineraries ==
Three different four-day and three-night itineraries are currently operated, with the possibility of combining two of them into six-night journeys. All of the itineraries start from and end at London Victoria station, leaving in the afternoon of the first day and returning in the morning of the fourth day. The train does not travel at night, but rather stables overnight at a quiet location, in some cases on preserved railways. Most catering is on board the train, but each itinerary features a formal meal at a nearby restaurant on its final evening.

The three itineraries travel from London to, respectively, Cornwall, Wales and the Lake District. A fourth route was originally scheduled for 2026, but has not yet transpired.

== Rolling stock ==
=== Locomotives ===
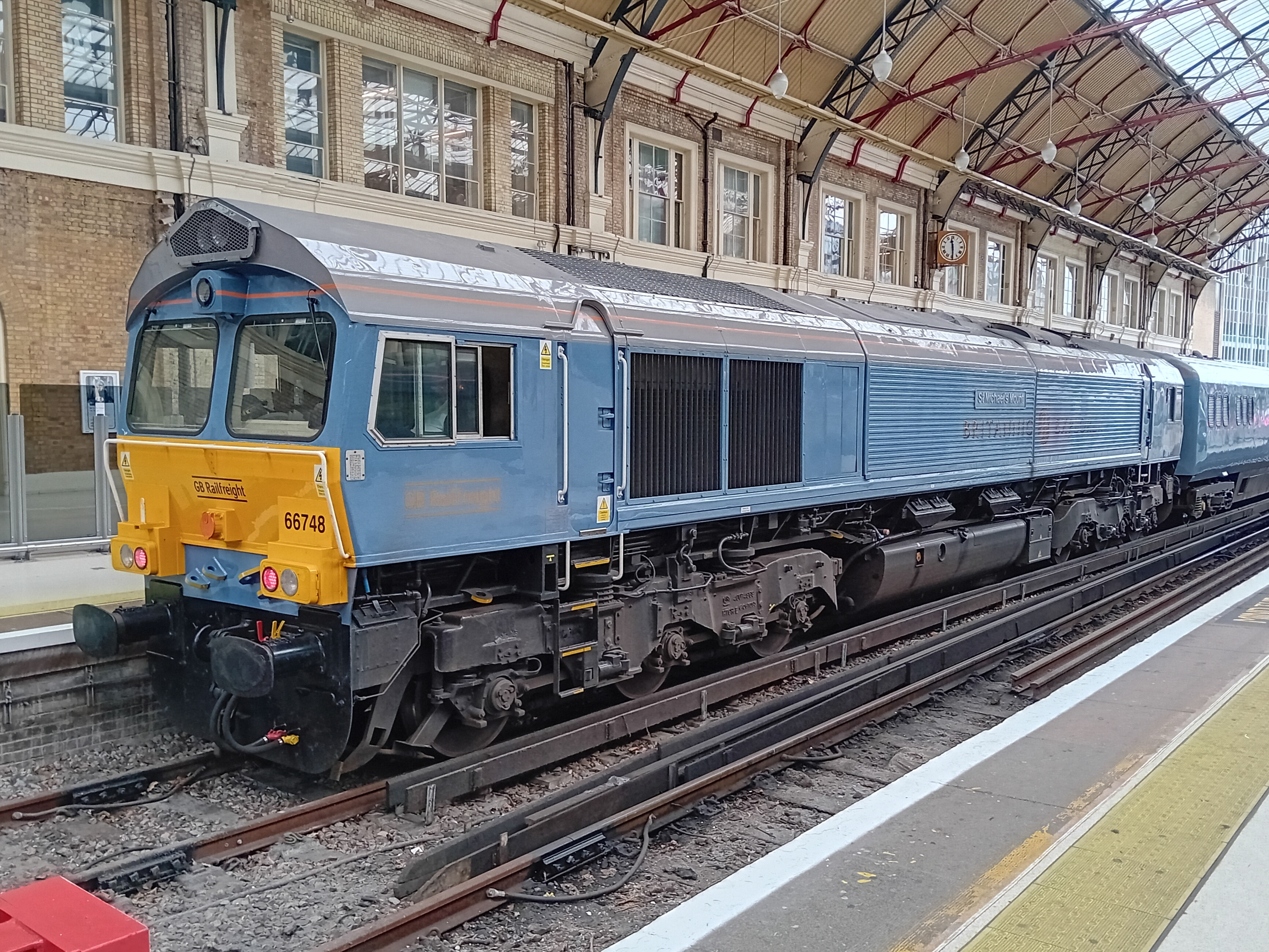
Class 66 locomotive in Britannic Explorer colours at London Victoria

The Britannic Express is hauled by locomotives of GB Railfreight, who have hauled Belmond trains in the UK, including the Royal Scotsman, since 2015. GB Railfreight's Class 66 No. 66748 St Michael's Mount was repainted into the train's livery for this purpose, but the train is often hauled by other locomotives of the same class.

As part of Belmond’s commitment to reduce its carbon footprint, in July 2025 Belmond and GBRf agreed that from 2027 the Britannic Explorer would use the new Stadler-manufactured Class 99 locomotives, which can run on both electricity and renewable fuel.

=== Carriages ===
The train consists of ten carriages comprising an observation and bar car, two dining cars, five sleeping cars, a staff car and a generator car.
