= Hunter Plastics =

English plumbing manufacturer

Hunter Plastics Limited was a major manufacturer and supplier of plastic plumbing products based in Kent.

== Origins ==
Ronald "Eddy" Edmondson (1917–2007) was a qualified architect and surveyor and joined the Royal Artillery in World War II. At the end of the War he was stationed in Turin, Italy, and became interested in a nearby factory where the Germans had been experimenting with plastic injection moulding. Returning home after the War, Eddy rented a corner of a factory in Hither Green and set up his own plastic moulding company, Plastiers Limited (Lewisham) on 18 October 1946.

He carried out early pioneering work with a variety of plastic moulded products and machinery. He trade-moulded plastic products for many different applications and customers, from table mats, brooches and earrings, ring cases (for wedding and engagement rings) and plastic chandeliers.

As the business grew Eddy and the team moved from Hither Green to New Eltham and then in 1962 moved to Belvedere.

== The Hunter Group ==
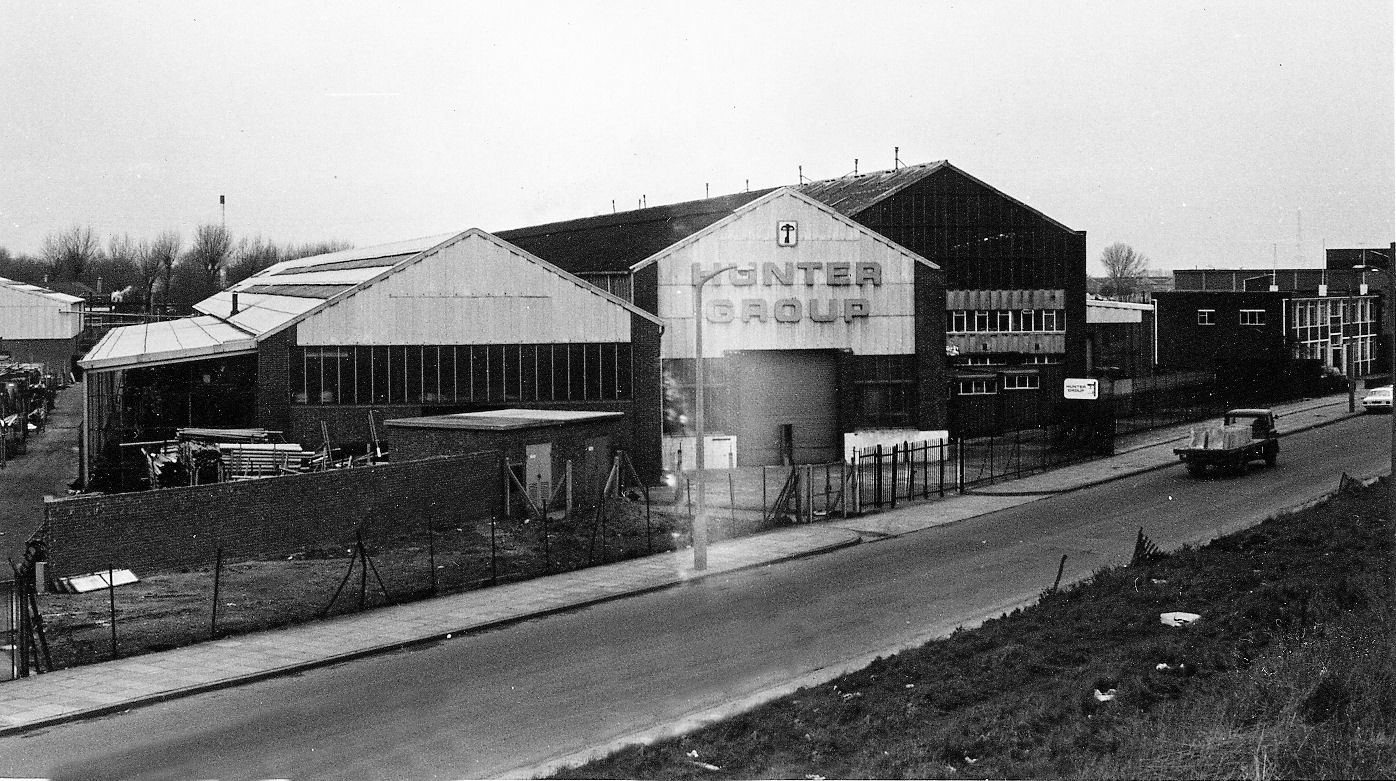
The Hunter Group factory in Nathan Way about 1970

With the move to Belvedere, production began on extruding rainwater gutter and pipes. All through the 1960s Plastiers began acquiring and registering businesses, and in 1965 they created The Hunter Group. In 1966 the Replant Works of Black Clawson, a printing machinery manufacturer in Nathan Way, Plumstead became available and Eddy saw the opportunity to bring all the Hunter Group companies together.

== Cravens injection moulding machine ==
The Hunter Group commissioned the largest, at that time, injection moulding machine in the world, the Cravens HPM 2000-IX-700, capable of a shot weight up to 25 kg

== Origins of name ==
Eddy Edmondson's grandfather was Hunter Edmondson (born 1852). Hunter Edmondson was named after his paternal grandmother, Mary Hunter (born about 1782 in the Lake District).

== The Business ==
Hunter Plastics Limited was incorporated on 21 July 1967 under the name Hunter Plastic Industries Limited and the next year, with the financial assistance of Hambros Bank, it launched its own range of PVC rainwater, soil and waste products called the Hunter Series 1970+.

Also in 1968 Hunter Plastics purchased another site in Nathan Way to house the extrusion hall. In the event, this never happened and the building is now the Hunter fittings plant.

In the 1970s the company focused more on rainwater and drainage products and a PVC underground drainage system was added to the portfolio in 1971. Hunters quickly gained a reputation for its superior rainwater systems and was the first company to launch gutter fittings that did not rely on adhesive to hold the rubber seals in place. By 1972 Hunter Plastics employed 364 staff. Throughout the 1970s Hunter was very successful - at the time PVCu was displacing traditional materials, such as cast-iron gutters and soil pipes, lead waste pipes, earthenware soil pipes, and so the business grew every year as traditional materials lost market share.

Entering the 1980s, competition in the PVCu industry was increasing and the Hunter Group made a series of acquisitions to spread their product mix, among them Greenwood Airvac (1982), Waterloo Grill Company and Waterloo BV (1983). In the late '80s the Group appointed its first non-Edmondson Managing Director Ron Broome (who had previously worked with Hunter on a project with Tate and Lyle in Nigeria).

In 1991 the Edmondson family sold Hunter Plastics to ETEX, an international building products group. Since then Hunter has continued developing a wide portfolio of innovative products, including Surefit rainwater fittings that incorporate many novel features. Hunter have also been able to exploit the knowledge from within the ETEX Group and in 1998 launched Plumber's Bits an extensive range of high quality plastic products for plumbers. In 2003 Etex plastics manufacturing companies were reorganised, Hunter Plastics forming part of the worldwide Aliaxis group. In March 2006 Aliaxis took the decision to merge the production, sales and administration functions of Hunter Plastics and Multikwik.

In 2007 Hunter Plastics started to move its operations from Nathan Way to share a site with Marley Plumbing and Drainage at Lenham, Kent. Marley manufactures similar product ranges to Hunter and is also owned by the same parent company, Aliaxis. The movement of all manufacturing to Lenham was complete by the end of 2009, and then in January 2010 Hunter Plastics sold its manufacturing assets to a sister company, DHM Plastics Limited who in return contracted to supply Hunter Plastics with all necessary products "at a price that is competitive with the costs previously incurred." In the meantime, the logistics function remained in Nathan Way until it also moved to Lenham in the first half of 2011.

With effect from 1 January 2013 Hunter Plastics Limited sold its trade and business to DHM and consequently ceased to trade and became dormant.

== See also ==
- Queen of Scots
