= Belmond Grand Hibernian =

Irish luxury train service (2016–2021)

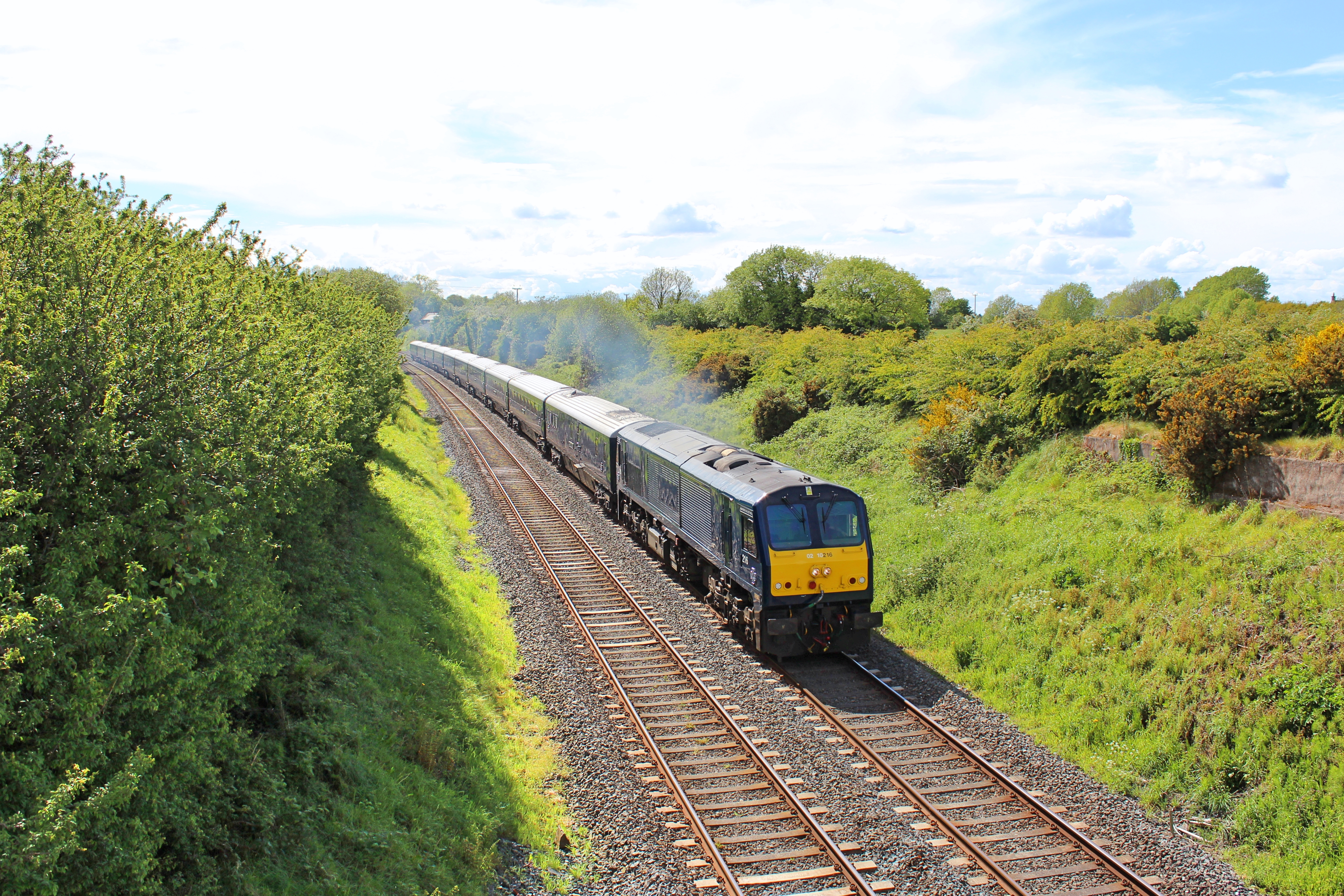

Overview
- Franchise: Railtour Operator
- Fleet: 10 × Mark 3 carriages
- Stations called at: Dublin Connolly
- Parent company: Belmond
- Dates of operation: 30 August 2016–14 October 2019

Other
- Website: belmond.com

The Belmond Grand Hibernian was a luxury train service in Ireland. The service was operated by Belmond, the operator of several other luxury trains including the Venice Simplon Orient Express. It was officially launched on 30 August 2016 and ceased on 14 October 2019. The carriages were transferred to Britain, and after a complete redesign, re-entered service again as Britannic Explorer in July 2025.

== Route ==
The planned routes took in some of the history of rail transport in Ireland and were centred around Dublin. The service was timetabled to operate on a weekly schedule: a four-night tour of the south-west of Ireland during the week, then a two-night weekend tour to Northern Ireland. The Taste of Ireland two-night trip was to travel from Dublin to Belfast, Belfast to Waterford and back to Dublin, while the "Legends and Loughs" was to go from Dublin-Cork-Killarney-Galway-Westport and back over four nights. One night per week was planned to be available for maintenance and other activities. For the 2016 season, full six-night Grand Tour of Ireland journeys were scheduled to run Tuesday-to-Monday, as these would consist of both the south-westerly Legends and Loughs and northerly "Taste of Ireland" segments with a change-over for some passengers in Dublin on the Saturday of each week.

== Rolling stock ==
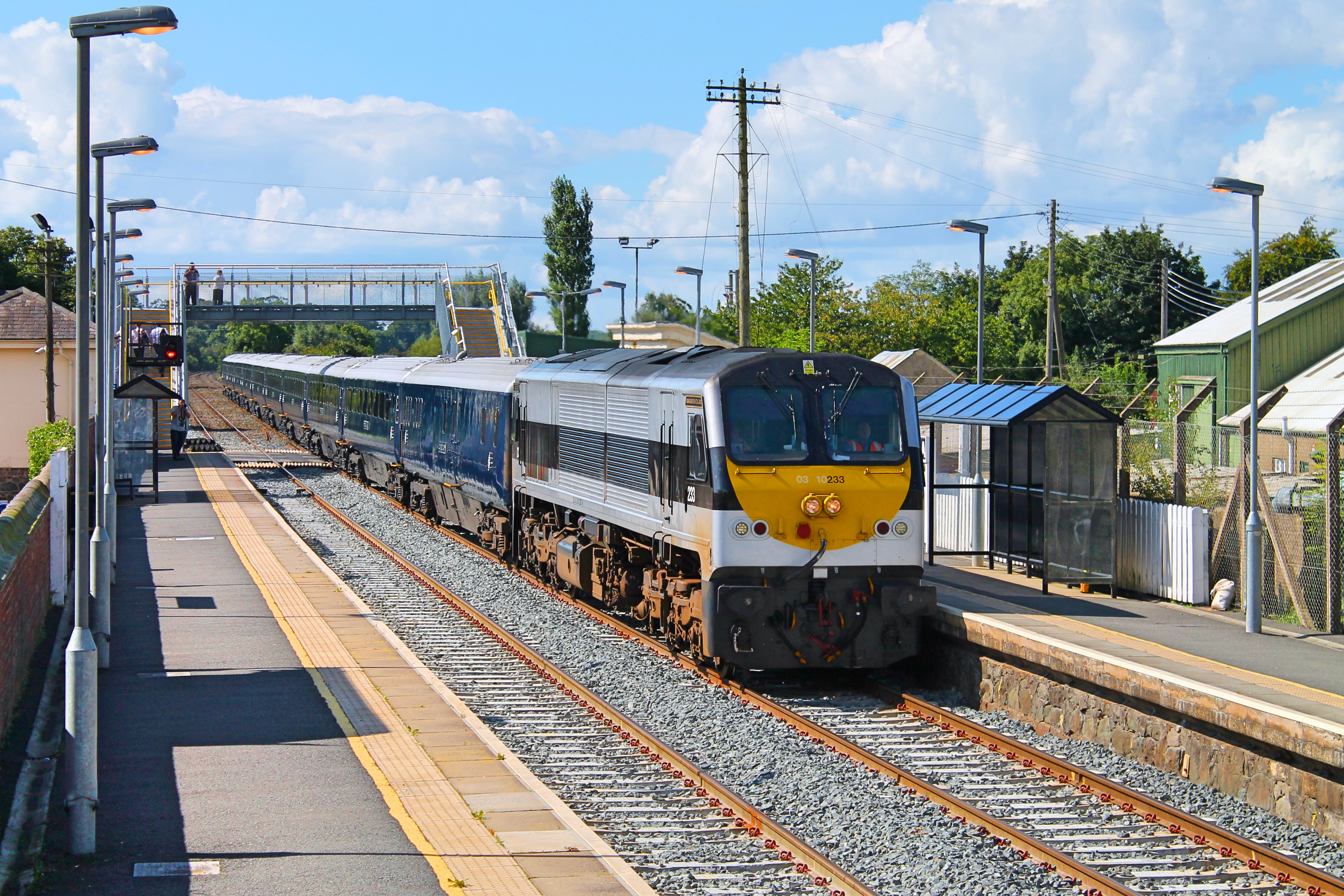
The Grand Hibernian on a test run at Moira, 28 August 2016.

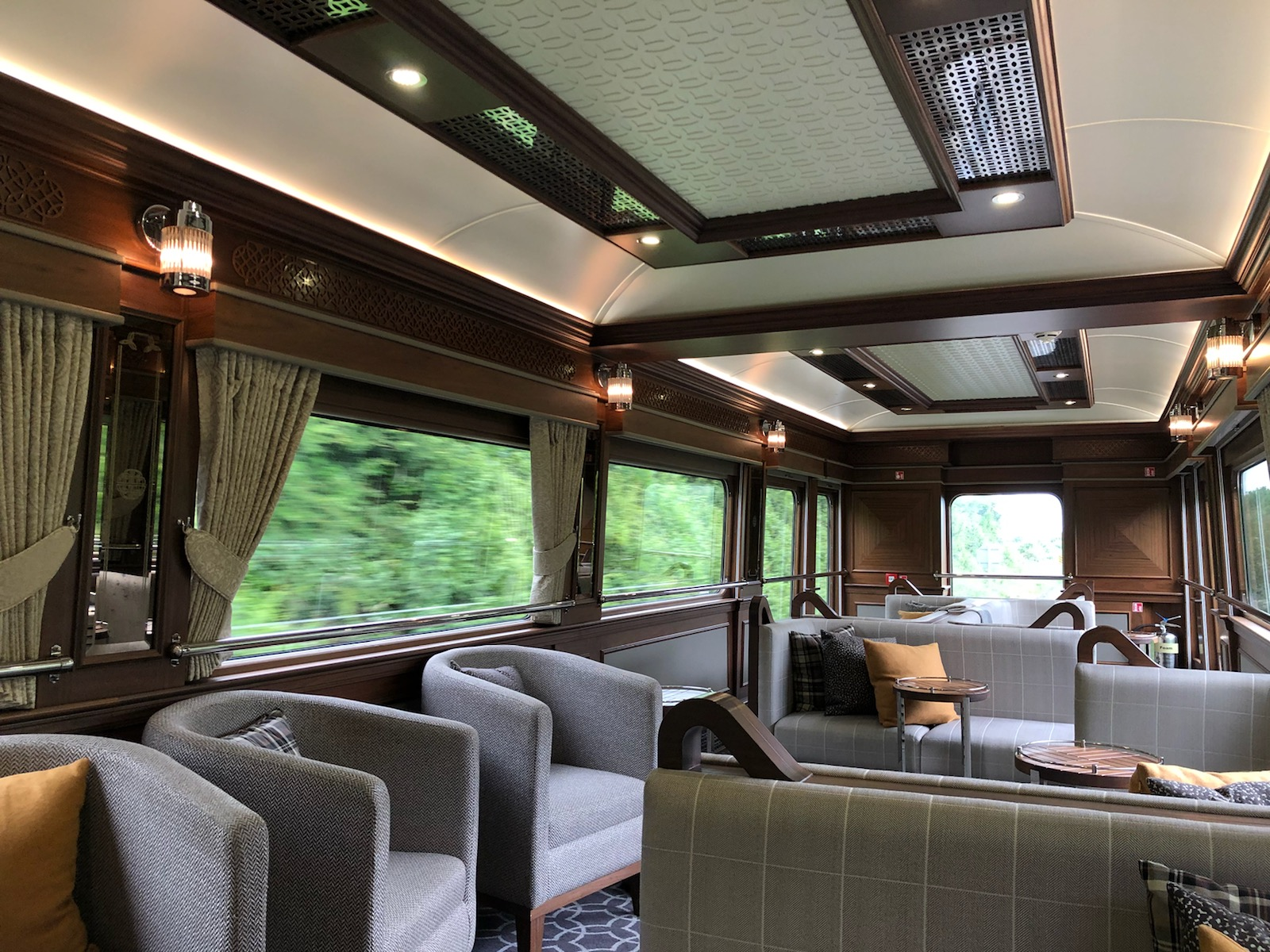
The interior of the lounge car in June 2018.

=== Carriages ===
The Grand Hibernian carriages were heavily renovated Mark 3s, originally built by British Rail Engineering Limited at Derby Litchurch Lane Works for Córas Iompair Éireann between 1980 and 1989, and withdrawn in 2009. The carriages underwent extensive engineering redesign and overhaul by Assenta Rail and were refurbished by the company in 2015 at a cost of £7 million. Internal fitting was carried out in Antrim, by Mivan. From the eleven Mark 3 carriages purchased, the train included five sleeping cars, two restaurant cars for dining and an observation car. The train composition and the carriage layouts were inspired by Belmond's other overnight luxury train on the British Islands: the Royal Scotsman. Carriage names were based on the counties of Ireland, several taken from each of the provinces of Ireland. Each carriage bore a dark blue livery, 'Grand Hibernian' lettering, an enamel nameplate, and a 'Celtic knot' logo.

Name	CIÉ number	EVN (Note: 55: Special Vehicle type)	Layout	Double	Twin	Seats
Kildare	7104	55 60 89-87 103-7	Observation/bar			all
Wexford	7169	55 60 88-87 102-0	Dining (casual)			24
Sligo	7171	55 60 88-87 101-2	Dining (formal)			20
Kerry	7137	55 60 76-87 005-2	Cabins (Note: One twin-bed cabin in Kerry, adjacent to corridor connection, is designed to be wheelchair accessible with 700-millimetre wide access route to day-facility carriages.)		4	
Down	7149	55 60 76-87 004-4	Cabins (Note: One family suite per carriage by connecting door between double and adjacent twin cabin.)	1	3	
Waterford	7129	55 60 76-87 003-8	Cabins	1	3	
Leitrim	7158	55 60 76-87 002-6	Cabins	1	3	
Fermanagh	7116	55 60 76-87 001-8	Cabins	1	3	
Donegal	7130	55 60 89-87 110-2	Crew accommodation			
Carlow	7601	55 60 99-87 104-3	Generator			
River Dodder / Abhainn na Dothra	216		Diesel locomotive			

=== Locomotives ===
IE 201 Class number 216 River Dodder has been overhauled specifically for use on the Grand Hibernian, having been repainted into the same dark blue livery as the coaches. It was built in 1994 by General Motors Diesel but placed in storage at Inchicore in 2010 following an accident. However, it was decided between Irish Rail and Belmond that 216 was the most suitable candidate to become the Grand Hibernian's dedicated locomotive, and as such it was brought back into service. In a green undercoat, it worked several test runs and freight trains in 2016 before being repainted into the Grand Hibernian's blue livery.

A second 201 class locomotive – presumedly 225 River Deel – was due to be converted for use with the Grand Hibernian in the event that 216 fails or is unavailable.

On 24 June 2017, 201 Class locomotive 209 River Foyle operated The Belmond Grand Hibernian run to Belfast.

=== Refurbishment ===
In December 2014, IÉ 201 Class locomotive number 229 moved the rake of eleven vehicles from Dublin Heuston Inchicore Works to Dublin North Wall sidings. The Mark 3 carriages in the rake were ordered as 7601, 7149, 7104, 7129, 7169, 7158, 7171, 7122, 7130, 7116 and 7137. Ten of the carriages were transported by road to Scotland in 2015 for refurbishment and painting. However, 7122 remained in Dublin and as of December 2016 is to be used for spare parts for the other vehicles in the set. It remains in Irish Rail's orange livery, with no refurbishment having taken place, in spite of it being purchased by Belmond.

By mid-2016, all of the coaches had returned to Ireland to be taken to Mivan Engineering, Antrim, to have their interiors fitted. After fitting out, they were all returned to Dublin, with the last coach (No. 7149 ''Down'') leaving Antrim on 30 July 2016. All carriages were unloaded at North Wall sidings and taken by rail to Inchicore, where they were assembled into a complete train in preparation for test runs.

== In service ==
Throughout the summer of 2016, several test runs took place prior to the train entering service. The first of these took place on Wednesday 10 August 2016 behind 216, which ran from Dublin to Thurles and back. The first test runs to reach Northern Ireland took place on Sunday 28 August 2016, when 201 Class No. 233 (In common user livery) stood in for 216 for a return trial from Dundalk to Belfast York Road. The final trial occurred on Monday 29 August 2016 with 216, which ran from Dublin to Portarlington and back.

The Grand Hibernian was officially launched on Tuesday 30 August 2016, with Irish Rail Intercity-liveried 226 hauling the inaugural train out of Heuston station at 14:20. The final train of the season operated on Monday 24 October, and on Wednesday 26 October a return trip from Dublin to Thurles was arranged for the Irish Rail staff involved.

On 15 April 2017, the Grand Hibernian was trialled south of Connolly station as far as Gorey.

The 2017 season began on Tuesday 25 April. On 29 April the train ran to Gorey instead of Belfast as normally scheduled due to engineering works on the Belfast - Dublin line.

== Ending and afterwards ==
On 18 February 2021 the ceasing of the operation was announced due to the COVID-19 pandemic. The train had last run on 14 October 2019 and was suspended for all of 2020 owing to the pandemic.

The carriages have left Ireland in 2022, and Belmond planned to relocate the train to a new place inside Europe. It has been realized in shape of the new service Britannic Explorer, which had its first ride in July 2025, featuring round trips from London to Cornwall, Wales and The Lake District. Similar to the latest improvements of Royal Scotsman the train was refitted with Grand Suite compartments (as known also from Venice Simplon-Orient-Express) and a room for wellness treatments.
