= FGC 254 Series =

Diesel locomotive

254 Series
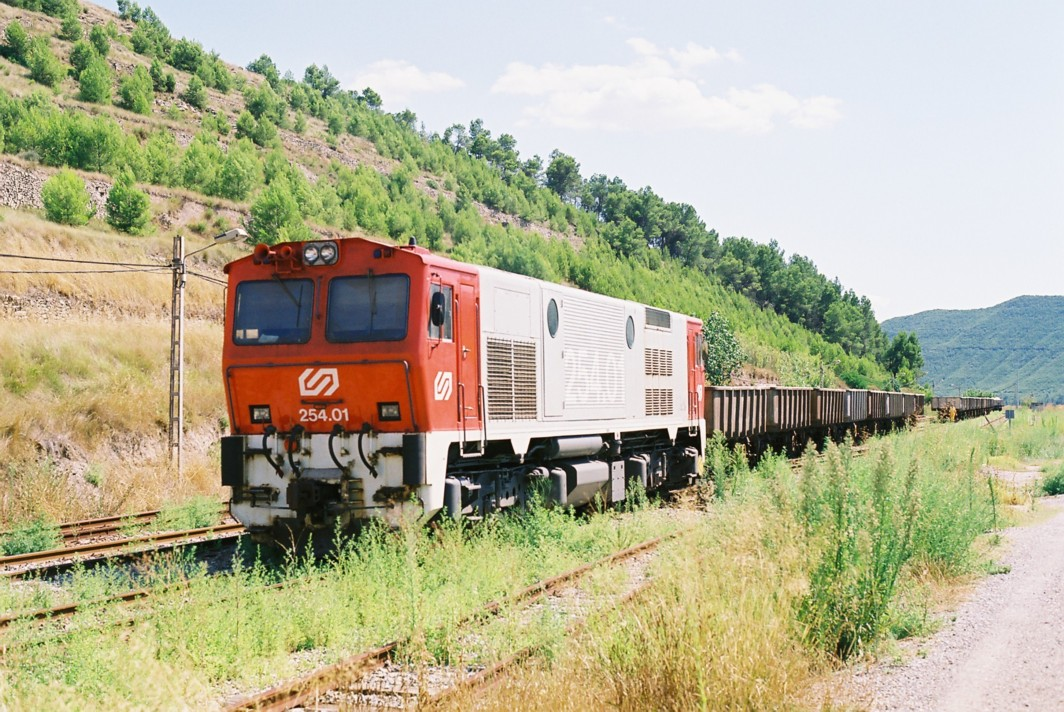
- FGC 254-01 (August 2007)
Type and origin
- Power type: Diesel
- Builder: Meinfesa
- Model: JT 18-LC
- Total produced: 3
Specifications
- Configuration
  - UIC: Co'Co'
- Gauge: 1,000 mm (3 ft 3 3/8 in)
- Wheel diameter: 914 mm (36.0 in)
- Length: 16.3460 m (53 ft 7.54 in)
- Width: 2.670 m (8 ft 9.1 in)
- Height: 3.8 m (12 ft 6 in)
- Axle load: 13.5 t
- Loco weight: 81 t
- Fuel capacity: 3000l
- Engine type: GM 8-645E3C
- Transmission: electric
- Loco brake: air, rheostatic.
- Train brakes: air
Performance figures
- Maximum speed: 90 km/h (56 mph)
- Power output: 1214 kW

The 254 Series is a meter gauge freight diesel locomotive built for Ferrocarrils de la Generalitat de Catalunya (FGC).

Three locomotives were built in 1990 by Meinfesa, at the same time as the RENFE Class 319.2 with which it shares a similar external appearance, as well as both having GM-EMD engines and transmissions.

The locomotive is used for potash and salt trains, and occasional special historical passenger trains, on the Llobregat–Anoia Line.

== See also ==
- FGC 257 Series
