= Taiwan Railway R200 =

Taiwanese diesel-electric locomotives

R200
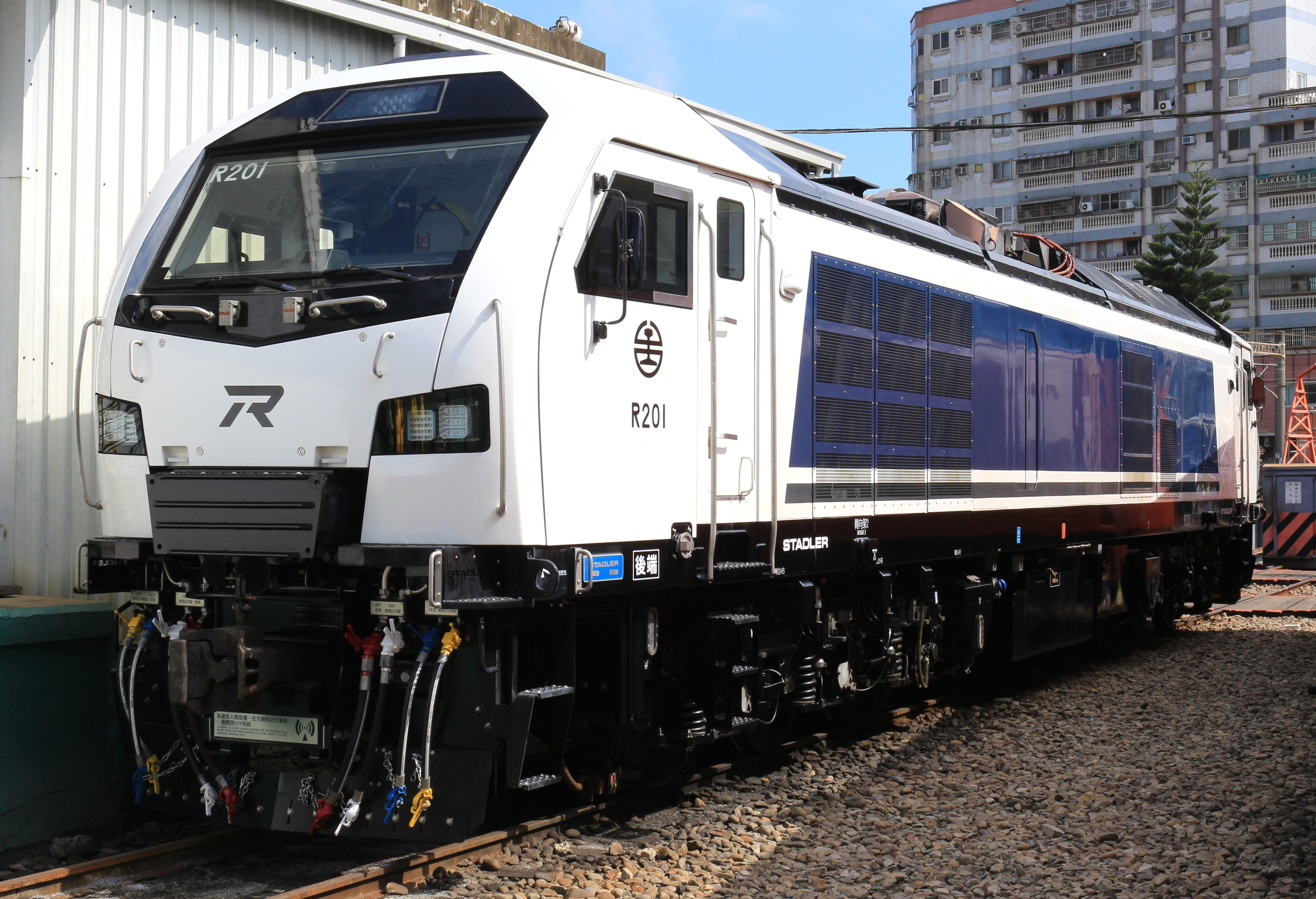
- TRA R201 on display at Changhua Roundhouse
Type and origin
- Power type: Diesel-electric
- Builder: Stadler
- Build date: 2023–present
- Total produced: 34
Specifications
- Configuration
  - UIC: Co'Co'
- Gauge: 1,067 mm (3 ft 6 in)
- Length: 20 m (66 ft)
- Loco weight: 96 t (94 long tons; 106 short tons)
- Prime mover: Cummins QSK60 V16
- Traction motors: 6 × TMF 64A-33-6 286 kW (384 hp) 3-phase AC induction motor
Performance figures
- Maximum speed: 120 km/h (75 mph)
- Power output
  - Starting: 430 kN (97,000 lb_{f})
Career
- Delivered: July 2023 -forward

The R200 are a series of diesel-electric locomotives built by Stadler Rail for use by Taiwan Railway, starting in 2023.

== History ==
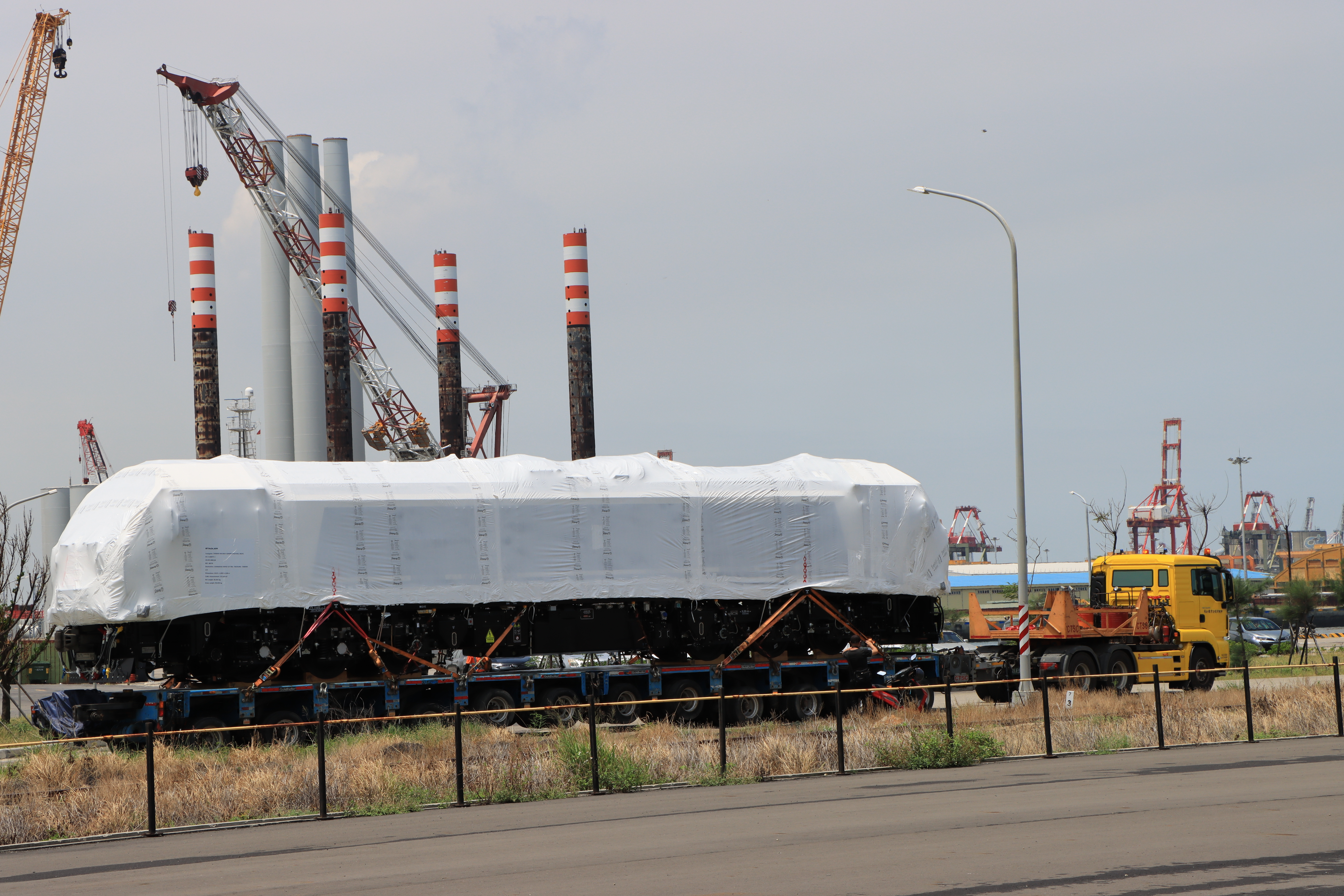
New R200 locomotive delivered to the port of Taichung in 2023

In 2015, the Taiwan Railways proposed an overall vehicle purchase and replacement plan (spanning from 2015–2024) and proposed the purchase of 102 locomotives, of which 34 were diesel-electric locomotives. After the electrification of the railway system around the island in 2020, passenger trains on the operating routes will rarely use diesel locomotives for traction, and service will be adjusted to use diesels exclusively for freight, emergency rescue, national defense and military needs.

The 165 million euro contract for the locomotives was signed in October 2019; the locomotives are the first major order for Swiss company Stadler from the Pacific region. They are to be built at the firm’s plant in Valencia, Spain. The first two locomotives in the series, numbered R201 and R202, were previewed at Changhua Locomotive Depot in July 2023, expected to be put into revenue service at the end of 2023.

== Technical details ==
The locomotives are designed to work in tropical and subtropical climates, in environments of up to 100% humidity and temperatures of 45 degrees Celsius. They are equipped with a five-stage environmentally friendly diesel engine and have the ability to immediately report problems to their base of operations, allowing maintenance personnel to be dispatched for repairs. The locomotives are also equipped with a forward-looking Doppler radar speedometer, a connector observation camera, and multiple protective devices for the cab, all of which make operations safer for locomotive crews. The manufacturer notes they are designed to run in "demanding mountainous topography – similar to that of Switzerland – and in extreme climatic conditions. Stadler is very familiar with adapting rail vehicles to such specific challenges."
