= Queen of Scots (train) =

The name Queen of Scots was originally given to an LNER/BR Pullman train which ran from London King's Cross to Glasgow Queen Street via Leeds Central, Harrogate, Newcastle and Edinburgh Waverley. Later the Queen of Scots was a luxury touring train that ran exclusive tours around Scotland's scenic countryside. The train was mostly aimed at American tourists. The train ran from 1985 to 1989 as the Royal Scotsman and in 1990 as The Queen of Scots.

== History ==
Purchased by Richard Edmondson of Hunter Plastics as three individual vehicles, the observation car was acquired from Sir William McAlpine, the Dining Saloon was in use as part of a house on the south coast of England and the Family Saloon was purchased from British Rail in 1972. Additionally, three former Mark 1 sleeping cars and two Mark 1 day cars converted for sleeping use were added, making a nine coach train. Fully restored by 1985, it was leased to the L&R Leisure Group to operate as The Royal Scotsman, a role it continued to fulfil until 1989 when L&R made an enquiry regarding outright purchase of the train.

The train's owner, Richard Edmondson, had refused to sell: this left L&R with little choice but to purchase a replacement train, a task which was accomplished over the winter of 1989/90. With the replacement Royal Scotsman now formed by mostly steel bodied vehicles, the original wooden-bodied vintage cars were relaunched as The Queen of Scots, with both trains departing Edinburgh on tours of the Scottish Highlands during the summer of 1990. That same year, the Gulf War broke out and large numbers of American tourists ceased travelling to the UK which left bookings for both trains short of expectations.

Edmondson decided to withdraw The Queen of Scots from traffic, remove the steel-bodied sleeping cars and store the three vintage vehicles at a private site in Sussex. The sleeping cars were moved around the various heritage railways, mostly to provide staff sleeping accommodation. Three years would pass before the train would re-enter traffic but this time minus the sleeping cars, its intended use now being to offer single day charters to bespoke itineraries as dictated by the customer.

Between 1994 and 2007 use of the train was sporadic, the three vintage cars together with the Mark 1 staff / generator coach were based in the carriage shed at Clapham Junction. One regular job for the train throughout this period was Ladies' Day at Royal Ascot where a departure from London Waterloo ran through to Alton, Hampshire before returning via Bagshot and Camberley to Ascot. This lengthy route was to allow time for a relaxed champagne breakfast to be served. Similarly, in the evening, a five-course dinner was served, again with the train operating via Alton.

Bookings for the train diminished, so much so that it was costing more to keep at Clapham than it was making, a factor in the decision by owner Richard Edmondson to sell the train in 2008. There was only one serious contender that could both afford the asking price and guarantee the safe future of these unique vehicles. West Coast Railways at Carnforth purchased the train outright in 2008 and have since fully restored it, albeit in a non-authentic livery. The train now makes at least two visits to Scotland during the summer months, providing personal transport for present day owner David Smith.

== Fleet details for both Royal Scotsman and Queen of Scots ==
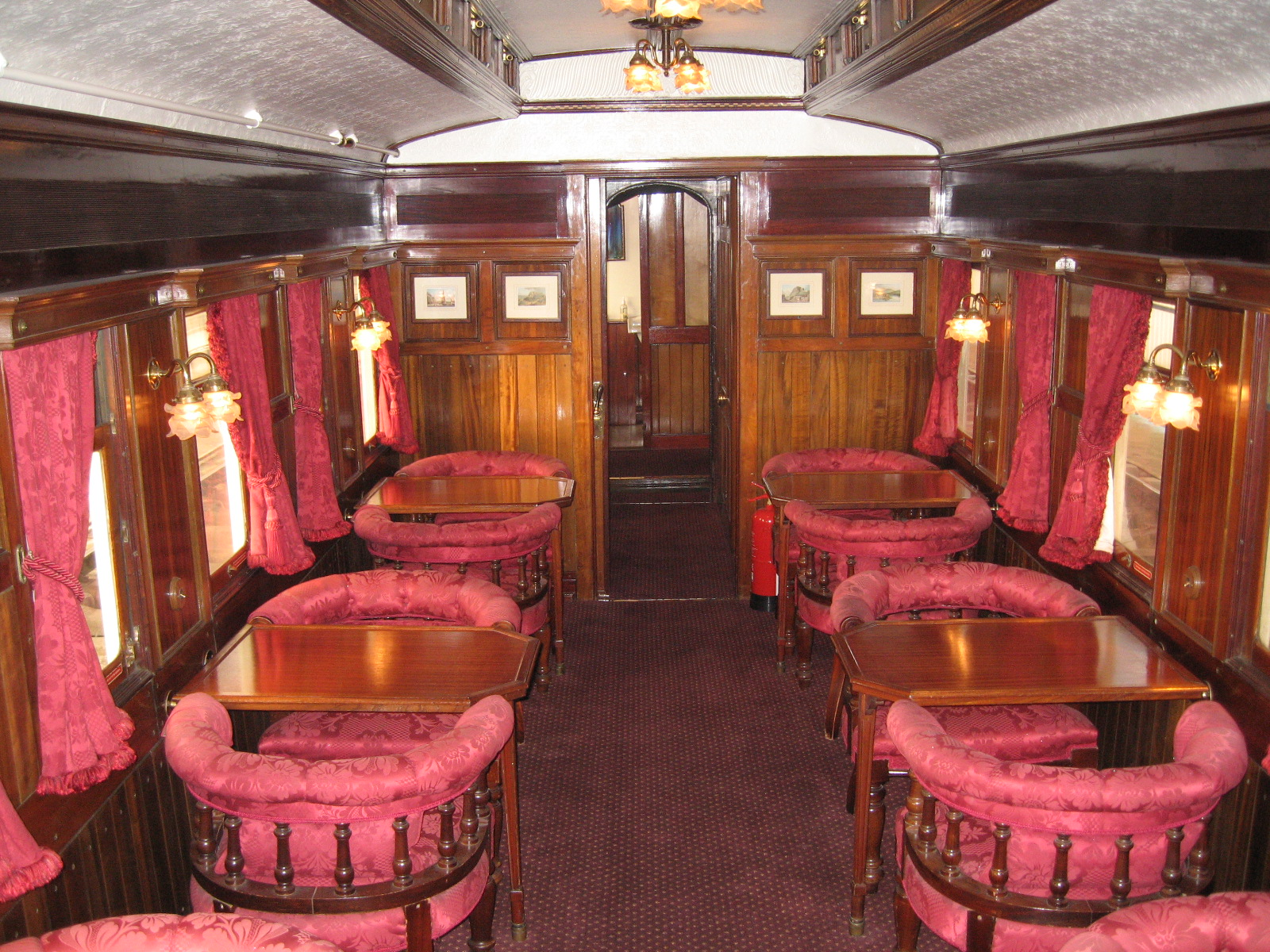
Interior of the lounge car on the train.

Car	Number	RS/QoS Number	Built for	Built by	Year built	Location
Brake Second Corridor	35407	99886	British Railways	Wolverton Works	1963	Carnforth MPD
Sleeping Car First	2108	99883	British Railways	Metro-Cammell	1960	Carnforth MPD
State Car	26169	99882	British Railways	York Works	1963	Titley Junction railway station
State Car	26208	99884	British Railways	York Works	1962	Crewe DMD
Sleeping Car First	2110	99885	British Railways	Metro-Cammell	1960	Carnforth MPD
Sleeping Car First	2127	99887	British Railways	Wolverton Works	1961	Carnforth MPD
Sleeping Car Composite	2442	99888	British Railways	Wolverton Works	1961	Bluebell Railway
Dining Car	5159	99880	London & North Western Railway	Wolverton Works	1891	Carnforth MPD
Family Saloon	807	99881	Great Northern Railway	Doncaster Works	1912	Carnforth MPD
Observation Car	41	99052	London & North Western Railway for West Coast Joint Stock	Wolverton Works	1892	Carnforth MPD

Car	Number	Built by	Place	Year built	Location
Service Car No. 1	35407	British Railways	Wolverton Works	1963	Carnforth MPD
Service Car No. 2	35322	British Rail	Wolverton Works	1967	Carnforth MPD
Dining Car	5159	London & North Western Railway	Wolverton Works	1891	Carnforth MPD
Family Saloon	807	Great Northern Railway	Doncaster Works	1912	Carnforth MPD
Observation Car	41	London & North Western Railway for West Coast Joint Stock	Wolverton Works	1892	Carnforth MPD

=== WCJS Observation Car No. 41 ===
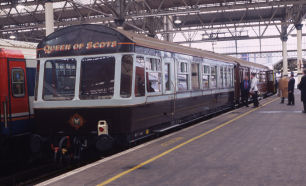
Observation Car, London & North Western Railway for the West Coast Joint Stock, 41

Through trains from London to Scotland on the West Coast Main Line did not initially have dining cars although the morning and afternoon Scotch Expresses would stop en route at Preston for twenty minutes, in which time a full three-course meal would be served in the station dining room to all the passengers.

After many years of discussion about providing on-train dining facilities, in November 1891 the two West Coast companies agreed to add three pairs of purpose-built dining cars to the West Coast Joint Stock. Each pair consisted of a kitchen/third class diner coupled to a first class dining saloon, and entered service on 1 July 1892.

All of these dining cars were heated by a coal-fired stove and were lit by gas, but were converted to electric lighting in 1902. They remained as part of the West Coast Joint Stock until the summer of 1905 when they were allocated between the London & North Western Railway and the Caledonian Railway. The Caledonian took two of the diners, and renumbered one of them No. 41.

=== GNR Family Saloon No. 807 ===
To allow wealthy families to travel in privacy between their London houses and their country estates, the old railway companies in Great Britain offered family saloons. These special carriages could be attached to the regular scheduled trains so that the whole family, the servants and all their luggage could travel together.

This car was built in 1912 as such a family saloon by the Great Northern Railway. The large centre room was the family room where the ladies and children travelled. To one side of this was the gentlemen's or smoking room, and the family toilet. At the other end of the coach there was originally a 3rd class compartment for the servants, a 3rd class toilet and a luggage area at the very end (hence the double doors). All this area has now been replaced by a library, although the servants' call indicator is still in place over the door leading through to the family room.

The Great Northern Railway was very strict about its design criteria, one being that 3rd class accommodation must always be narrower than 1st class. Thus we have the unusual design detail that the family saloon was built narrower at one end (for the servants) than the other.

As the requirement for private carriages diminished, the family saloon was used less and less and eventually fell out of use. It was sold by British Rail in 1972, having latterly been used as a work-study office. The Family Saloon is finished in varnished teak - the Great Northern Railway had since the mid 19th century built all of their carriages out of solid teak.

=== LNWR Dining Car No. 5159 ===
In response to a luxury carriage supplied by the American Pullman Company appearing on the Midland Railway, a competitor railway between London and Manchester, the London & North Western Railway built this Dining Car especially for its Manchester expresses. It was built as one of a pair of coaches which ran permanently coupled together, and entered service in July 1890. No 5159 had a kitchen and seating for 10 passengers, while its partner had seating for 20 and no kitchen. Although there was access from one coach to the other (and two toilets), it was not possible to walk into the other coaches in the train - this was not yet a common facility. Consequently, passengers booked to spend their entire journey in the dining car. Two years later, when provision was made for passengers to walk through, doorways were simply cut into the ends of the carriage. Thus, at the kitchen end of the coach, passengers would pass through the kitchen.

Because of its small size, it was soon replaced by a much larger carriage and so found itself relegated to secondary services. During the First World War, it was requisitioned by the Army and taken to France as part of a mobile HQ for Field Marshal Sir Douglas Haig.

After the war the LNWR declined to have it back, so in 1921 it was used to make a house at Middleton-on-Sea on the south coast of England near Southampton. In 1978 it was "rescued" and has now been restored as closely as possible to original, while taking into account modern standards of cooking, safety and comfort.

The Dining Car was painted in the livery of the London & North Western Railway, the splendidly named Plum and Spilt Milk until being sold in 2008 to West Coast Railways at Carnforth. The car now carries an unofficial version of LMS Crimson Lake livery.

It is the oldest Dining Car in the world.
