= Cummins Quantum Series =

Family of internal combustion engines

Cummins Quantum Series is a family of internal combustion engines, developed and manufactured by American Cummins for various heavy-duty use cases. The Quantum series comes with an electronic controlled module. It is used in heavy duty machines and in railway machines.

== Current types ==
The lineup consists of adaptations of F, B, L, X series and Quantum-only K series. There are also G12 and T30 engines in the lineup.

=== Diesel engines ===
Vast majority of Quantum series engines are Diesel engines. Those are compared in the table below:

Engine	Displacement	Bore	Stroke	Power	Torque	Governed Speed	Dry/Wet Weight
QSF2.8 I4	171 ci (2.78L)	3.7 in (94 mm)	3.94 in (100 mm)	49 - 74 hp (37 - 55 kW)	147 - 221 lb-ft (199 - 300 N*m)		~ 507 lb (230 kg)
QSF3.8 I4	230 ci (3.76L)	4.02 in (102 mm)	4.53 in (115 mm)	74 - 130 hp (55 - 97 kW)	277 - 360 lb-ft (376 - 488 N*m)		~ 616 lb (280 kg )
QSB4.5 I4	275 ci (4.5L)	4.02 in (102 mm)	5.39 in (137 mm)	109 - 173 hp (81 - 130 kW)	347 - 520 lb-ft (470 - 705 N*m)	3500	~ -/818 lb (-/371 kg)
QSB6.7 I6	409 ci (6.7L)	4.21 in (107 mm)	4.88 in (124 mm)	133 - 550 hp (99 - 410 kW)	431 - 1250 lb-ft (584 - 1695 N*m)	3400	~ -/1047 lb (-/475 kg)
QSL9 I6	543 ci (8.9L)	4.49 in (114 mm)	5.69 in (145 mm)	230 - 410 hp (172 - 306 kW)	675 - 1200 lb-ft (915 - 1627 N*m)	3300	~ 2153 lb (977 kg)
QSG12 I6 (Note: Derivative of M11 with updates backported from X series: "The new QSG12 brings a major advantage for Tier 4 Final and Stage IV equipment installations by restoring the envelope size of the QSM11 predecessor," "The QSG12 incorporates Cummins Xtra-High Pressure Injection (XPI) fuel system, derived from the larger and more powerful QSX15 Tier 4 Final engine. Although scaled down in size for the 12-liter platform, the XPI fuel system retains all the robust, heavy-duty characteristics of the system, " https://www.cummins.com/engines/qsg12-tier-4-finalstage-iv)	721 ci (11.8L)	5.2 in (132 mm)	5.67 in (144 mm)	335 - 512 hp (250 - 382 kW)	1700 lb-ft (2305 N*m)	2600	~ 2227/- lb (1010/- kg)
QSX15 I6	912 ci (15L)	5.39 in (137 mm)	6.65 in (169 mm)	400 - 675 hp (298 - 503 kW)	1650 - 2050 lb-ft (2237 - 2779 N*m)	2400	~ 3009/- lb (1365/- kg)
QSK19 I6	1150 ci (19L)	6.25 in (159 mm)	6.25 in (159 mm)	506 - 800hp (377 - 597 kW)	1775 - 2275 lb-ft (2407 - 3084 N*m)	2400	~ -/4250 lb ( -/1928 kg)
QSK23 I6	1404 ci (23.2L)	6.69 in (170 mm)	6.69 in (170 mm)	760 - 950 hp (567 - 708 kW)	2401 - 2897 lb-ft (3255 - 3928 N*m)	2100	~ -/6300 lb ( -/2858 kg)
QST30 V12	1861 ci (30.5L)	5.51 in (140 mm)	6.5 in (165 mm)	760 - 1500 hp (567 - 1119 kW)	2764 - 4877 lb-ft (3747 - 6612 N*m)	2100	~ -/7337 lb ( -/3328 kg)
QSK38 V12	2300 ci (38L)	6.25 in (159 mm)	6.25 in (159 mm)	920 - 1500 hp (686 - 1119 kW)	3591 - 4590 lb-ft (4869 - 6224 N*m)	2100	~10700 lb (4850 kg)
QSK45 V12	2746 ci (45L)	6.25 in (159 mm)	7.48 in (190mm)	1200 - 2250 hp (895 - 1678 kW)	4425 - 6300 lb-ft (5999 - 8542 N*m)	2100	~ -/13500 lb ( -/6123 kg)
QSK50 V16	3068 ci (50.25L)	6.25 in (159 mm)	6.25 in (159 mm)	1487 - 2500 hp (1109 - 1864 kW)	1800 - 7080 lb-ft (2440 - 9599 N*m)	2000	~ 13,822/14808 lb (6270/6717 kg)
QSK60 V16	3661 ci (60.2L)	6.25 in (159 mm)	7.48 in (190 mm)	1050 - 2850 hp (783 - 2125 kW)	6169 - 7839 lb-ft (8364 - 10628 N*m)	1900	~ 19258 lb (8754 kg)
QSK78 V18	4735 ci (77.6L)	6.69 in (170 mm)	7.48 in (190 mm)	3500 hp (2610 kW)	10157 lb-ft (14077 N*m)	1900	~ -/24134 lb (-/10947 kg)
QSK95 V16	5797 ci (95L)	7.48 in (190 mm)	8.27 in (210 mm)	3000 - 5100 hp (2237 - 3803 kW)	11671 - 17802 lb-ft (15824 - 24136 N*m)	1800	~ 29000 lb (13200 kg)
QSK120 V20	7246 ci (119L)	7.48 in (190 mm)	8.27 in (210 mm)	5000+ hp (3730+ kW)		1500	

=== Gas engines ===
Natural gas engines also exist.
