= Vossloh DE 18 =

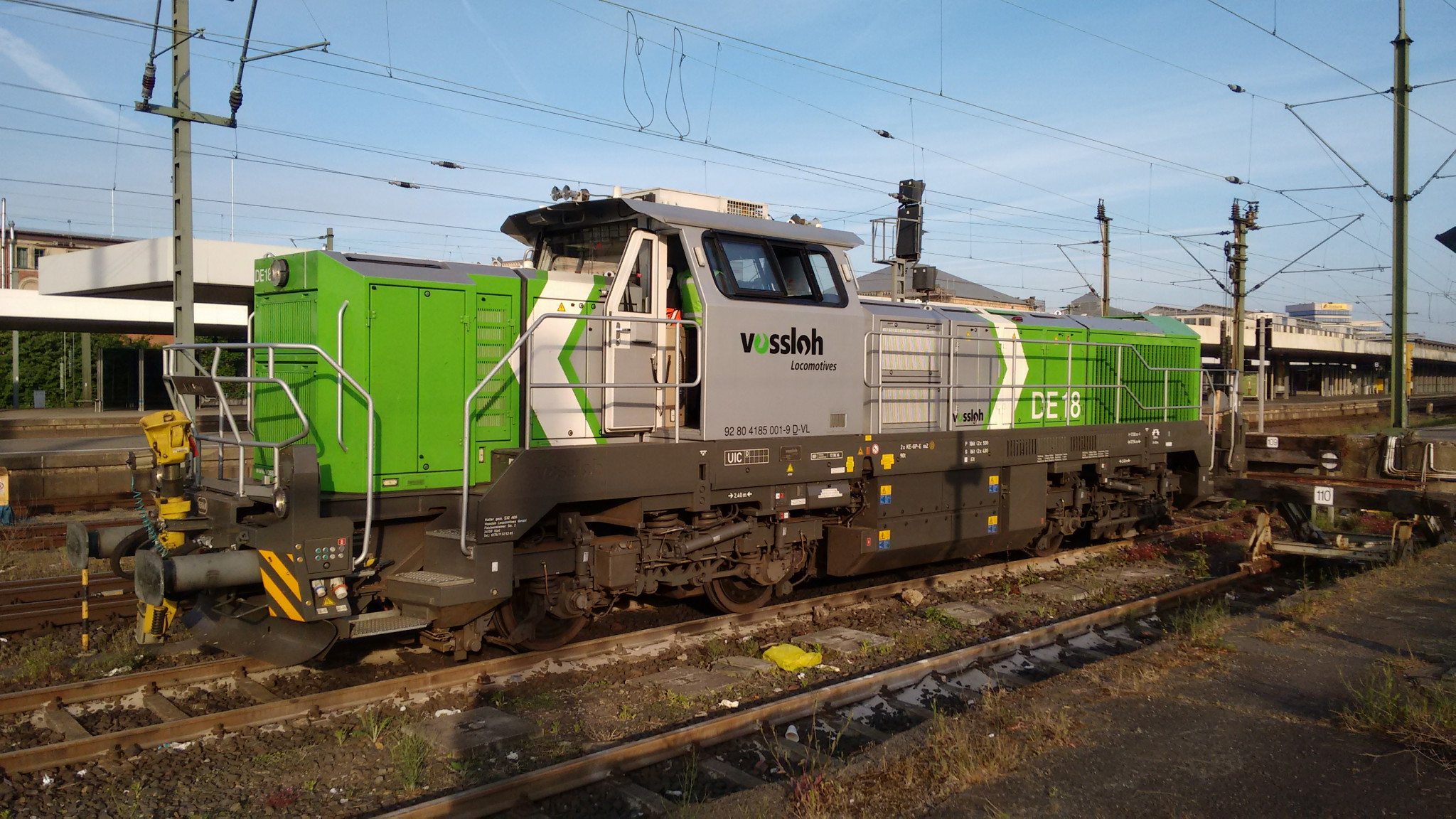
Type and origin
- Power type: Diesel-electric
- Builder: (Germany) Vossloh, Kiel
- Build date: 2010–present
- Total produced: 191 (as of September 2024)
Specifications
- Configuration
  - UIC: Bo′Bo′
- Gauge: 1,435 mm (4 ft 8 1/2 in)
- Wheel diameter: 1,000 mm (39.37 in) (new); 920 mm (36.22 in) (worn)
- Minimum curve: 55 m (180 ft 5 in)
- Length: 17.00 m (55 ft 9 in)
- Width: 3.08 m (10 ft 1 in)
- Height: 4.31 m (14 ft 2 in)
- Loco weight: 80–90 t (79–89 long tons; 88–99 short tons)
- Fuel type: #2 to #6 Diesel fuels
- Fuel capacity: 4,100 L (900 imp gal; 1,100 US gal)
- RPM range: 1,800 rpm
- Engine type: MTU 12V4000R43L
- Aspiration: Turbocharged
- Displacement: 57.240 litres (12.591 imp gal; 15.121 US gal)
- Cylinders: 12
- Transmission: AC-AC
Performance figures
- Maximum speed: 120 km/h (75 mph)
- Power output: 1,800.0 kW (2,413.8 hp)
- Tractive effort: 291 kN (65,000 lb_{f})
Career
- Locale: Germany
- Disposition: IN USE

The Vossloh DE 18 is a Bo′Bo′ diesel-electric locomotive. It is the first new diesel-electric locomotive to be built in Kiel since production of the DE 1002 ended in 1993. Up to 60% of the components are shared with the diesel-hydraulic G 18.

== Operations ==
The prototype locomotive was shown together with the smaller, diesel-hydraulic G 12 on InnoTrans 2010. The launch customer for the DE 18 was BASF, ordering 2 DE 18 locomotives for services at its plants in December 2011.
