= Boxcab =

Type of locomotive

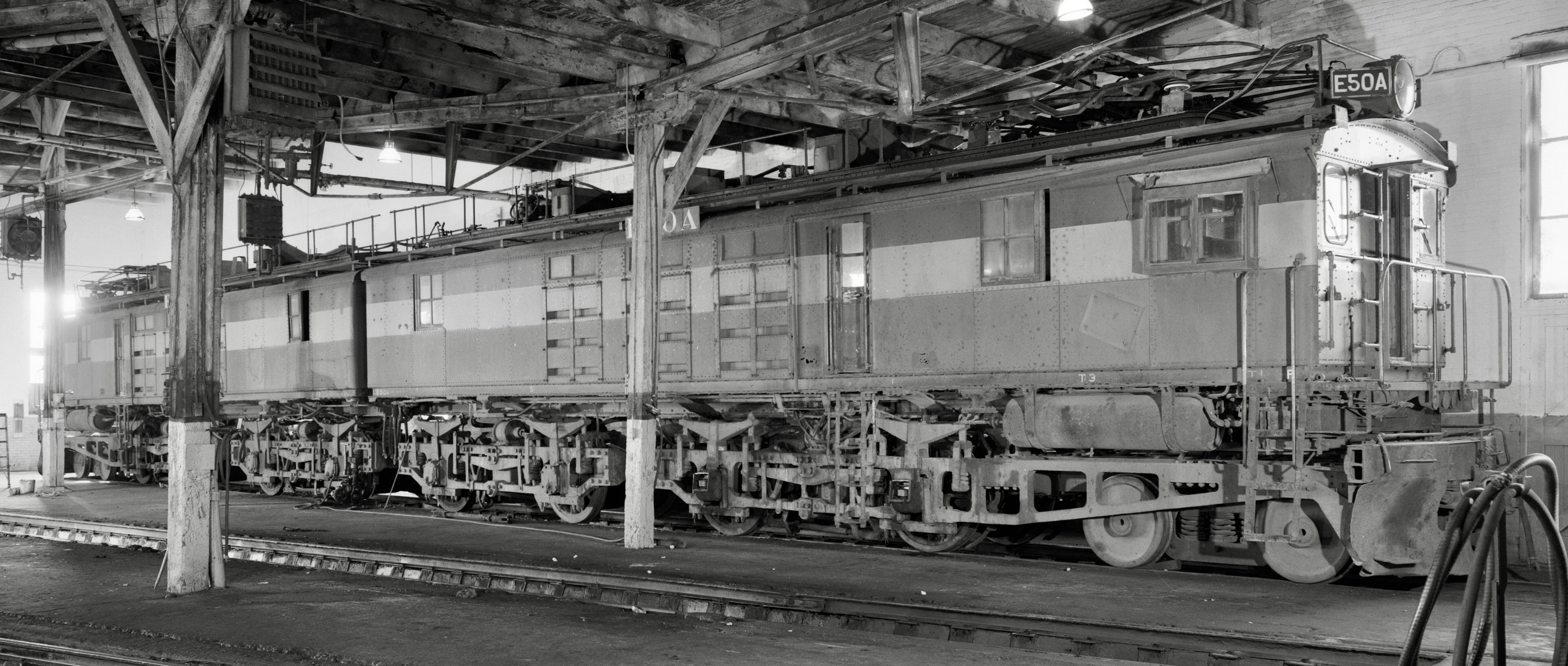
A 2-unit boxcab electric locomotive of the Milwaukee Road

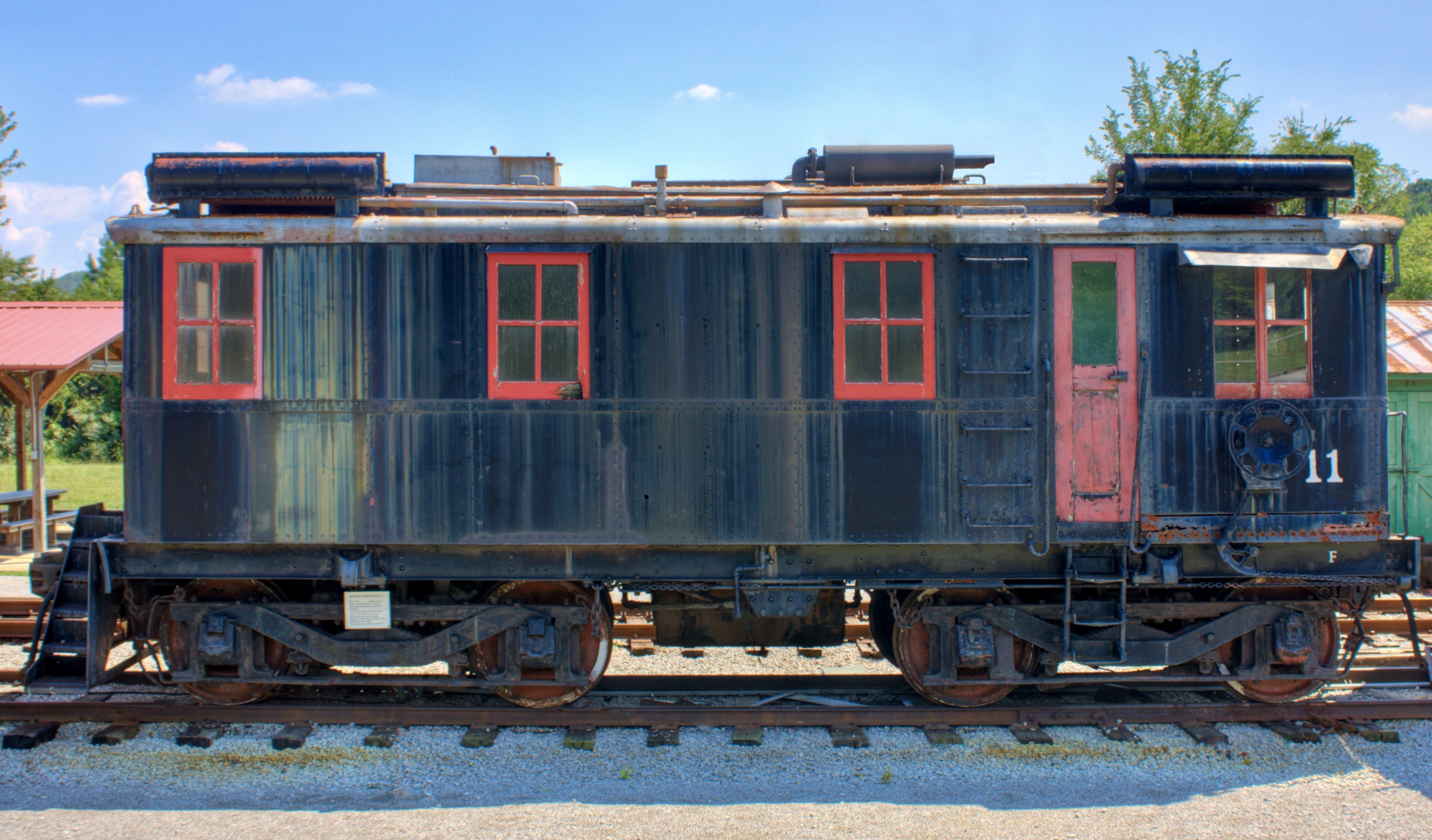
Alco diesel-electric boxcab at the North Alabama Railroad Museum

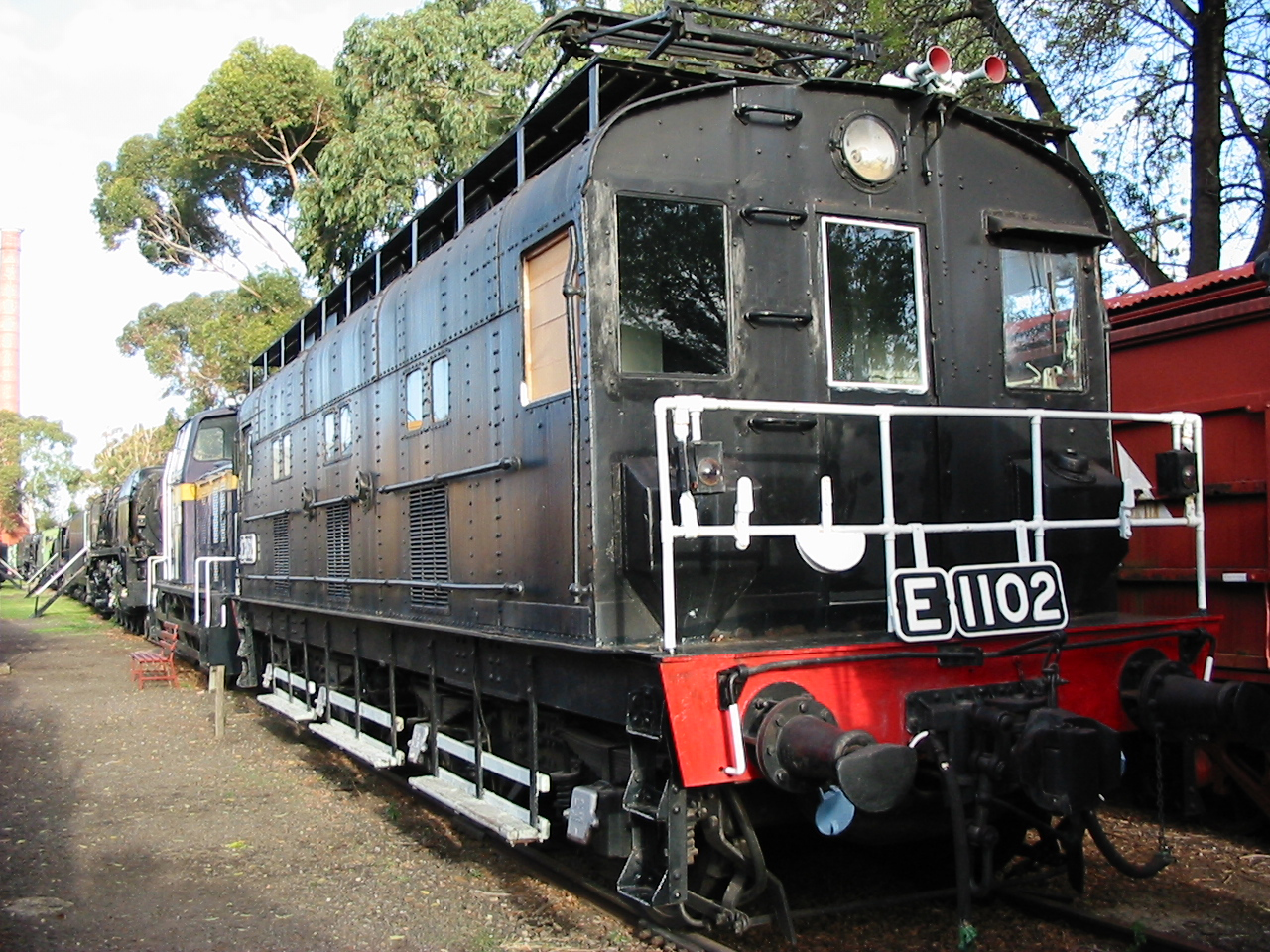
Preserved Victorian Railways (Australia) E class electric boxcab locomotive

A boxcab, in railroad terminology, is a term for a locomotive in which the machinery and crew areas were enclosed in a box-like superstructure. Deriving from "boxcar", the term mainly occurs in North America. The term has rarely been applied to diesel locomotives. It was also applied in Australia to Victorian Railways' "E" class second series electric locomotives.

The majority of boxcab locomotives were electric but they could also be diesel locomotives such as the case of the many AGEIR (Alco, General Electric, Ingersoll-Rand) boxcabs and British Rail Class 28, but as stated, the overwhelming majority of them were electric.

Most North American boxcabs were built a few years before and after 1930, the most prominent builders being Baldwin and Westinghouse, GE and Alco.

== Design ==
Locomotives had either a box-like body of equal height along their whole length including the cabs, the boxcab; or else the cabs were inset from the ends and a lower nose or 'hood' section protruded beyond.

Boxcabs did not have heavily styled ends or a superstructure consisting of multiple structures, although the prototype diesel/oil-electric, GE no. 8835, had one end prominently rounded – attributed to its trolley (tram) car ancestry – and the second and following 100-ton ALCO boxcabs had semi-cylindrical ends.

== See also ==
- Box motor
- GE three-power boxcab
- GE 57-ton gas–electric boxcab
