= GE three-power boxcab =

American electro-diesel locomotive

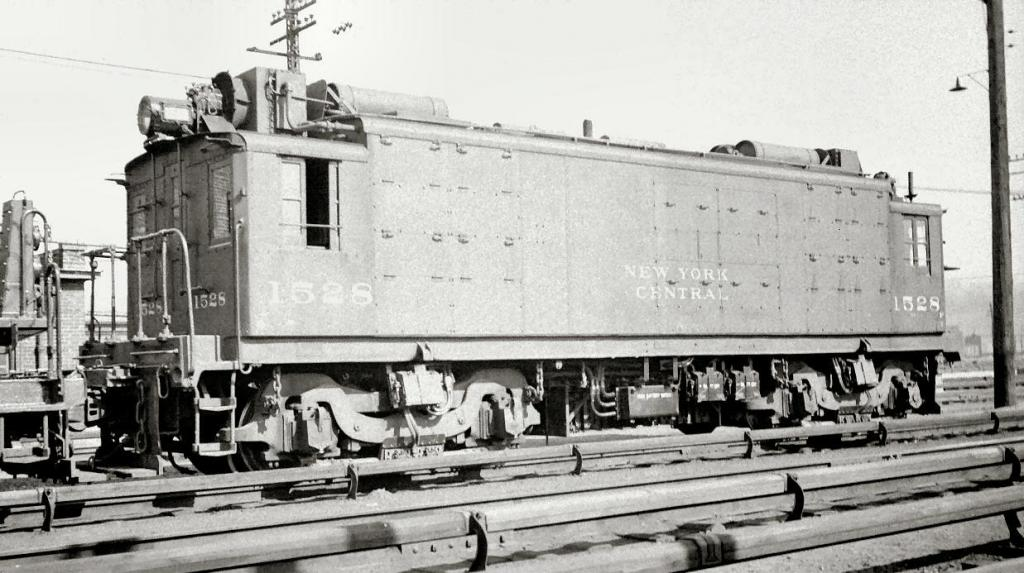
- New York Central #1528
Type and origin
- Power type: Electro-diesel & battery
- Designer: General Electric
- Builder: ALCO
- Order number: S-1690
- Model: 404-OEB-255
- Build date: 1930
- Total produced: 41
Specifications
- Configuration
  - AAR: B-B
  - UIC: Bo'Bo'
- Gauge: 4 ft 8 1/2 in (1,435 mm)
- Wheel diameter: 44 in (1,100 mm)
- Wheelbase: 34 ft 1 in (10.4 m)
- Loco weight: 252,400 lb (114.5 t)
- Fuel type: Diesel
- Prime mover: Ingersoll Rand
- RPM range: 550 maximum
- Engine type: 4-stroke diesel
- Displacement: 942 cu in (15.4 L)
- Generator: GE 200 kW (270 hp) 600 V
- Traction motors: GE-286-B
- Cylinders: 1 x 6
- Cylinder size: 10 in (254.0 mm) bore 12 in (304.8 mm) stroke
- Couplers: AAR knuckle
Performance figures
- Maximum speed: 40 mph (64 km/h)
- Power output
  - 1 hour: Electric: 1,580 hp (1,180 kW)
- Tractive effort: 30,000 lbf (130 kN); Internal power: 9 mph (14 km/h); Third rail power:19 mph (31 km/h)
Career
- Operators: New York Central; Rock Island: 1
- Class: Prototype: DEs-2; Series: DEs-3
- Power class: 600 V DC Third Rail
- Number in class: Prototype: 1 Series: 40
- Numbers: Prototype: NYC 1525, later 525; Series: NYC 1526–1566, RI 10000
- Withdrawn: 1960s, 1970s
- Disposition: All scrapped

The GE three-power boxcabs were early electro-diesel hybrid switcher locomotives. These boxcabs were termed oil battery electrics to avoid the use of the German name Diesel, unpopular after World War I.

== History ==
The prototype of these locomotives was New York Central 1525 delivered in February 1928. This locomotive had a center-cab design. After successful testing a series of 40 locomotives with boxcab carbodies were built along with the line of the ALCO boxcabs by a consortium of ALCO, General Electric, Ingersoll Rand and Electric Storage Battery. ALCO built the locomotive frame, carbody and running gear, General Electric built the generator, traction motors and controls, Ingersoll Rand provided the diesel engine, and the traction batteries were made by the Electric Storage Battery Company of Philadelphia.

The locomotives were mainly used in city areas for switching work, where exhaust-emissions-free operation was required at spurs entering factory halls. The main batch was ordered by New York Central Railroad to be used in the New York City area operating on the West Side Line and the High Line. Some three-power boxcabs also worked Chicago, Detroit, and Boston. One locomotive was built for Rock Island, which used it for switching the LaSalle Street Station in Chicago.

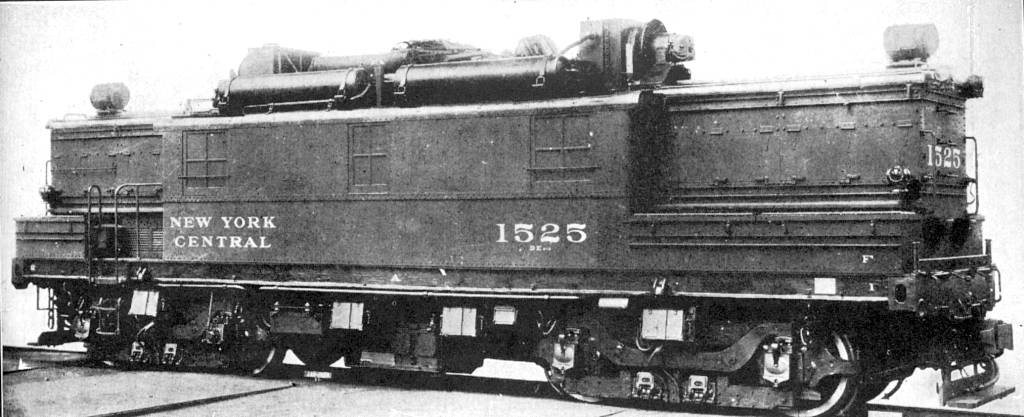
Prototype of GE three-power-boxcab delivered as NYC #1525

== Technical description ==
The principle of operation was similar to that of modern hybrid locomotives, the diesel engine driving a main generator of 600 volts DC, which provided charging current to a bank of batteries which powered four traction motors, one per axle. In addition to being powered by the diesel engine, these locomotives were capable of operating as electric locomotives. Two of these locomotives were equipped to operate off of 3000 volt overhead lines, and 34 were capable of operating off of a 600 volt third rail. The locomotives were equipped with a six-cylinder four-stroke in-line engine of 300 hp (224 kW). The diesel motor was used to charge the batteries, which could not be charged by third rail power. The battery consisted of 240 Exide Ironclad cells with a total capacity of 301 kWh.

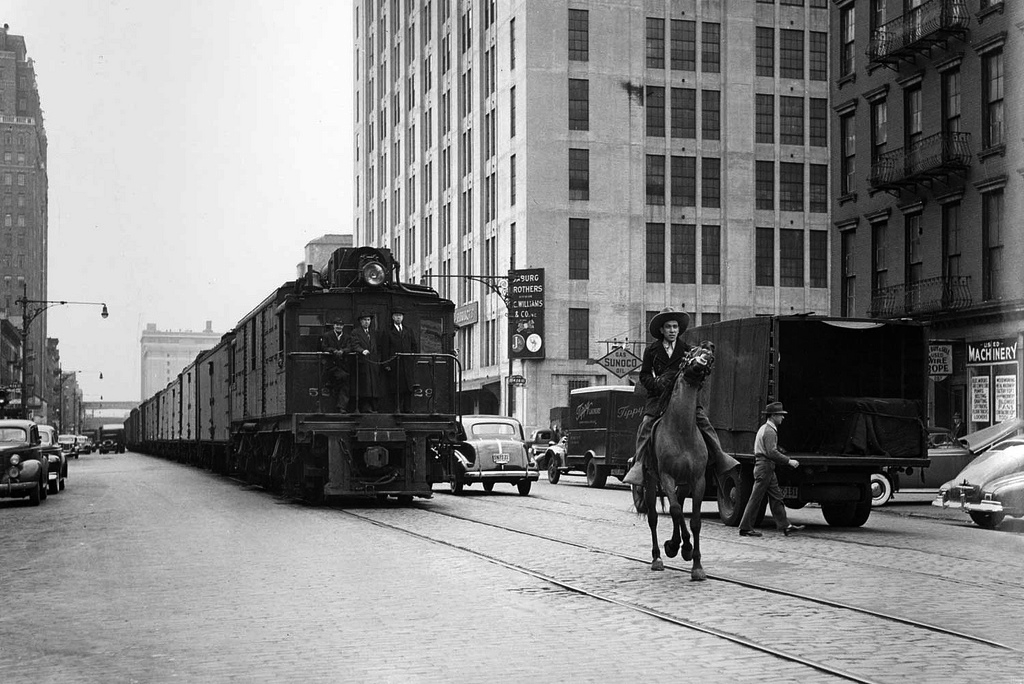
New York Central Lines’ “three-power” DEs-3 locomotive operating past the R.C. Williams Warehouse at 259 Tenth Avenue, Chelsea, Manhattan, New York in 1934.

== See also ==
- ALCO boxcab, and GE boxcab, diesel-electric variants of these locomotives.
