= Electro-diesel locomotive =

Railway locomotive capable of running either under electrical or diesel power

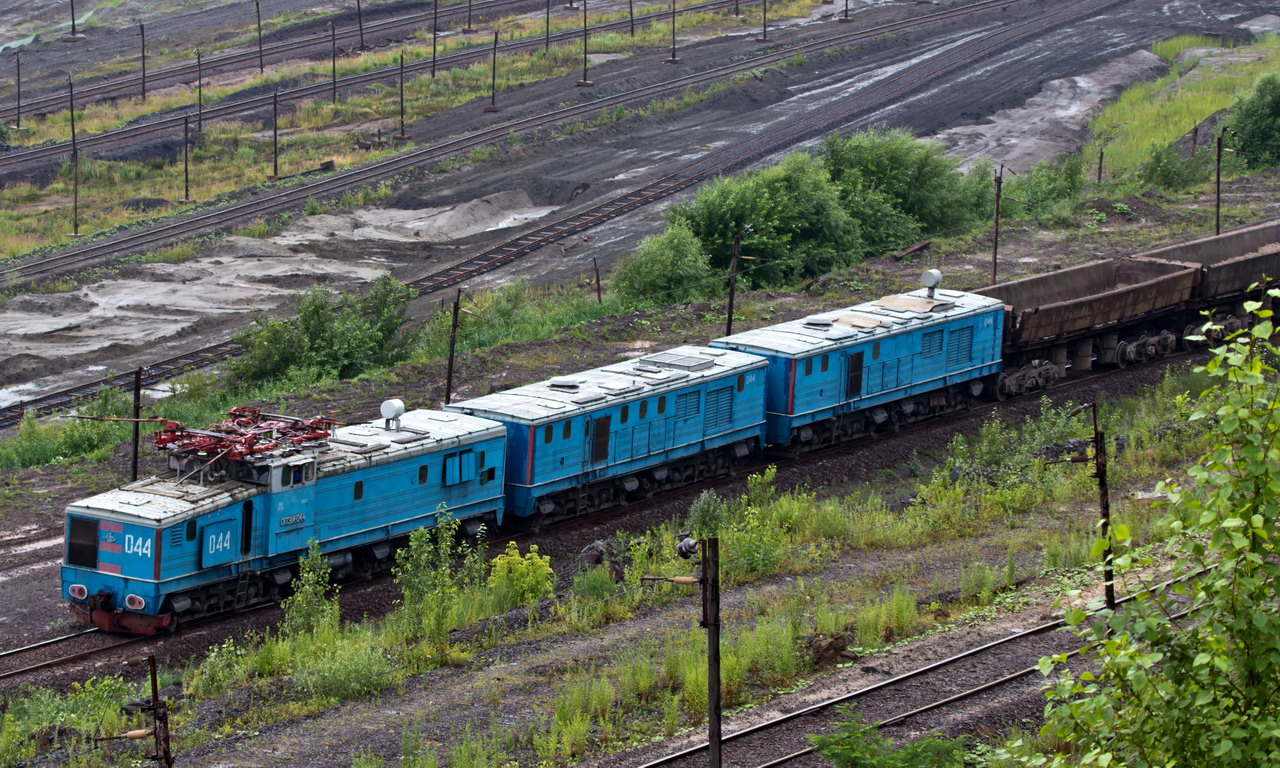
OPE1A industrial electro-diesel locomotive for quarry railways with primarily electric locomotive and two diesel B–units

An electro-diesel locomotive (also referred to as a dual-mode or bi-mode locomotive) is a type of locomotive that can be powered either from an electricity supply (like an electric locomotive) or by using the onboard diesel engine (like a diesel-electric locomotive).

== Overview ==
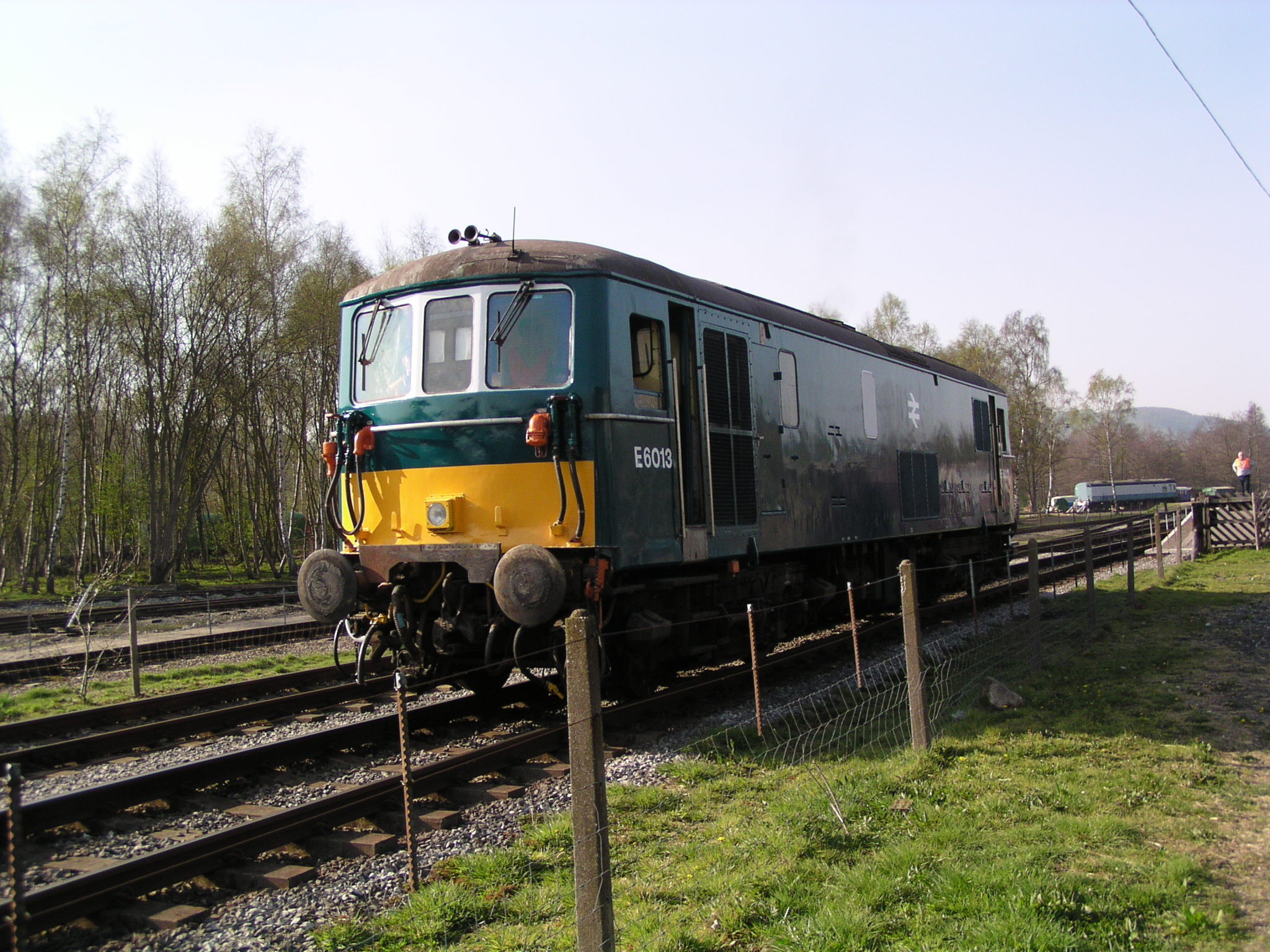
British Rail Class 73, no. E6013 (73107) at Rowsley South, on the Peak Railway on 17 April 2003. This locomotive was on loan from Fragonset Railways, and has since returned to main-line service with RT Rail.

Electro-diesel locomotives are used to provide continuous journeys along routes that are only partly electrified without a change of locomotive, avoid extensive running of diesel under overhead electrical wires and giving a solution where diesel engines are banned. They may be designed or adapted mainly for electric use, mainly for diesel use or to work well as either electric or diesel.

In most cases, electro-diesel locomotives use diesel–electric transmission and the same traction electric motors when moving in both diesel and electric mode, although with different power source. However, locomotives with diesel-mechanical or diesel-hydraulic transmission and separate electric motors were also created.

Note that, as well as the electric multiple unit (EMU) and diesel multiple unit (DMU), where no discrete locomotive is present, an electro-diesel (bi-mode) multiple unit train is called electro-diesel multiple unit (EDMU) or bi-mode multiple unit (BMU).

== Types ==
=== Primarily electric ===
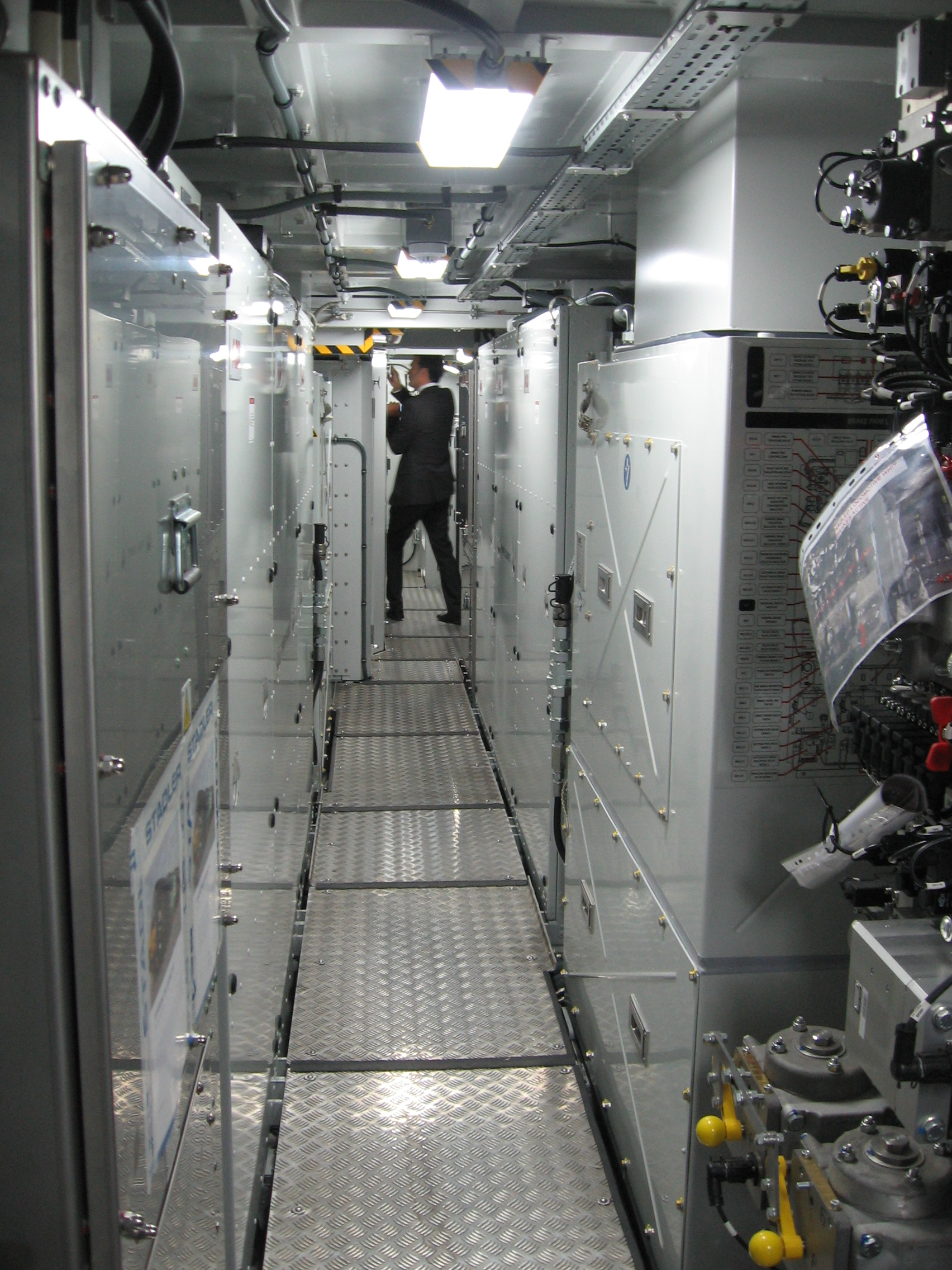
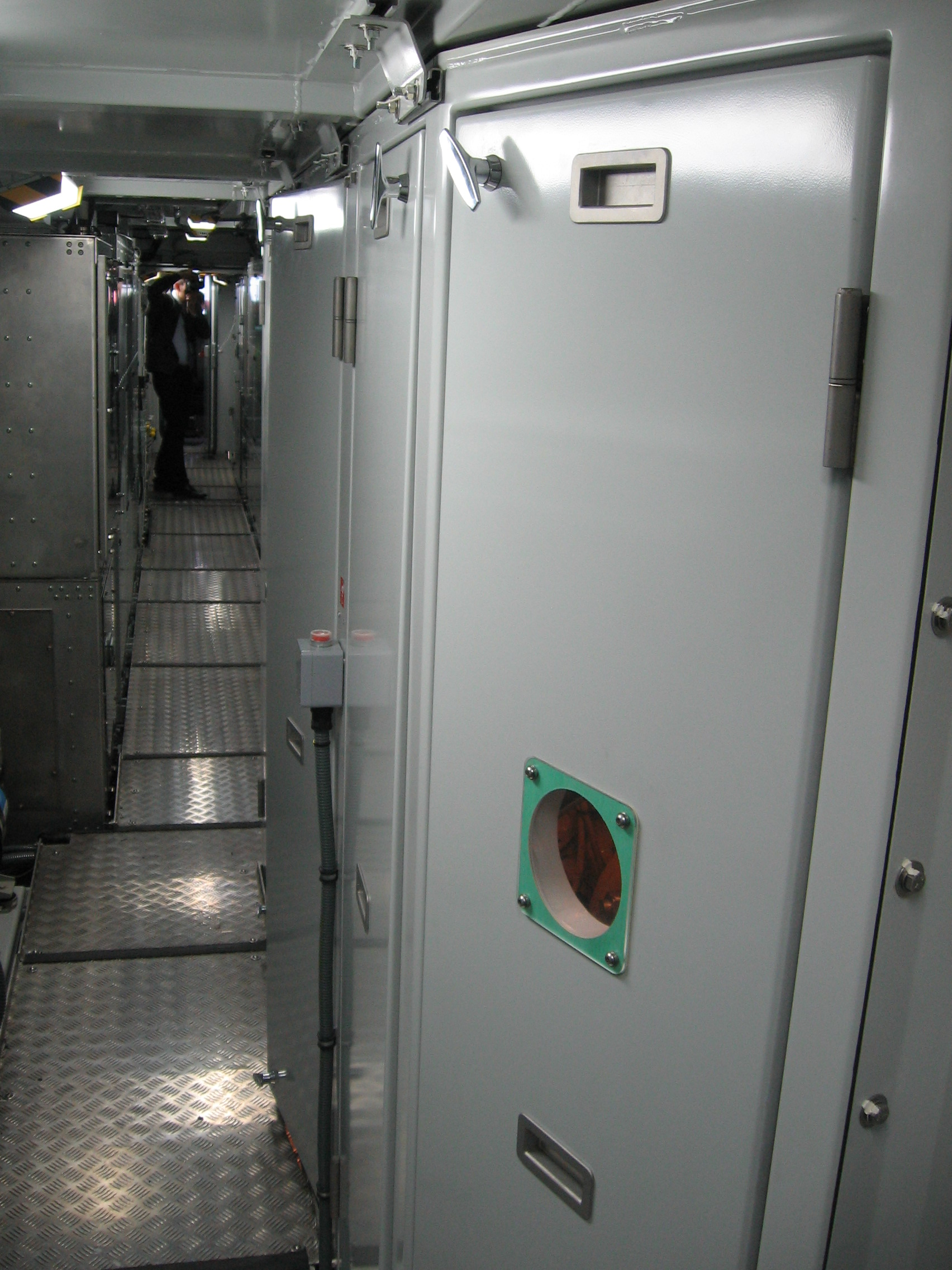
A machine room of a British Rail Class 88. Most of its interior is occupied with electric capacity (left photo), and the diesel generator is located in a side compartment (right photo)

This is effectively an electric locomotive with a relatively small auxiliary diesel prime mover intended only for low-speed or short-distance operation. For economy, the diesel engine and its generator are considerably smaller than the electric capacity, which occupies most of the interior space of a locomotive. Unlike typical diesel locomotives, where the diesel engine is located in the center of the frame, in mainly electric dual-mode locomotives the auxiliary diesel engine and generator can be located at the side of the engine room.

The output power of a diesel-generator in mainline locomotives of this type is similar to the power of engines of small shunting locomotives (usually no more than 800 kW) and is significantly smaller than the nominal power of electric motors when they are powered from the electric supply. For example, the Southern Railway types were of 1,600 horsepower (1,200 kW) or 'Type 3' rating as electrics, but only 600 horsepower (450 kW) as diesels. Later classes had as much as 2,500 horsepower (1,900 kW) on electric power, but still the same diesel engines. Despite this large difference, their comparable tractive efforts were much closer (around three-quarters as diesels) and so they could start and work equally heavy trains as diesels, but not to the same speeds.

These locomotives are usually operated on electrified railway lines that have non-electrified sections in the short final part of the route, the so-called "last mile". That can be small branch lines, stations with non-electrified siding tracks or tracks with another type of electrification, lines at cargo terminals, industrial facilities, construction sites, wharves, factories, mines, quarries at loading points where overhead lines cannot be used due to the need to load cargo. That eliminates the need to change a mainline locomotive to a shunter locomotive. Also in case of a third rail electrification, these locomotives can be used to cross non-electrified gaps (e.g. level crossings) or tracks with unpowered third rail (e.g. at freight yards during shunting operations or on metro lines at night, where the power supply is temporarily switched off for the safety of the working personnel).

The Southern Region of British Railways used mainly-electric dual-mode locomotives from the 1960s onwards to cross non-electrified gaps and to haul boat trains that used tramways at the ports of Southampton and Weymouth, and also at freight yards. Some of these locomotives were originally built as electro-diesel locomotives at the factory (e.g. British Rail Class 73), others were converted from electric locomotives (such as the British Rail Class 74).

Since the 2010s, in continental Europe, several locomotive manufacturers have started to produce electric locomotives with an optional small "last mile diesel", and this name was getting popular. These are electric locomotives with a small diesel engine of truck type (usually with 180–300 kW (240–400 hp) power output), used in low speed, low gear, for operation at small flat freight yards or with short freight trains at branch lines, eliminating the need for a shunter locomotive.

At the same time, locomotives with more powerful diesel engines, which are also capable of self-powered operations when hauling a normal freight train at low speeds, were also produced (e.g., British Rail Class 88 with 710 kW (950 hp) diesel engine). In terms of power, locomotives of this class takes an intermediate position between primarily electric locomotives with auxiliary diesel engines and fully dual-mode locomotives, though they are mostly limited to last mile operations.

=== Primarily diesel ===
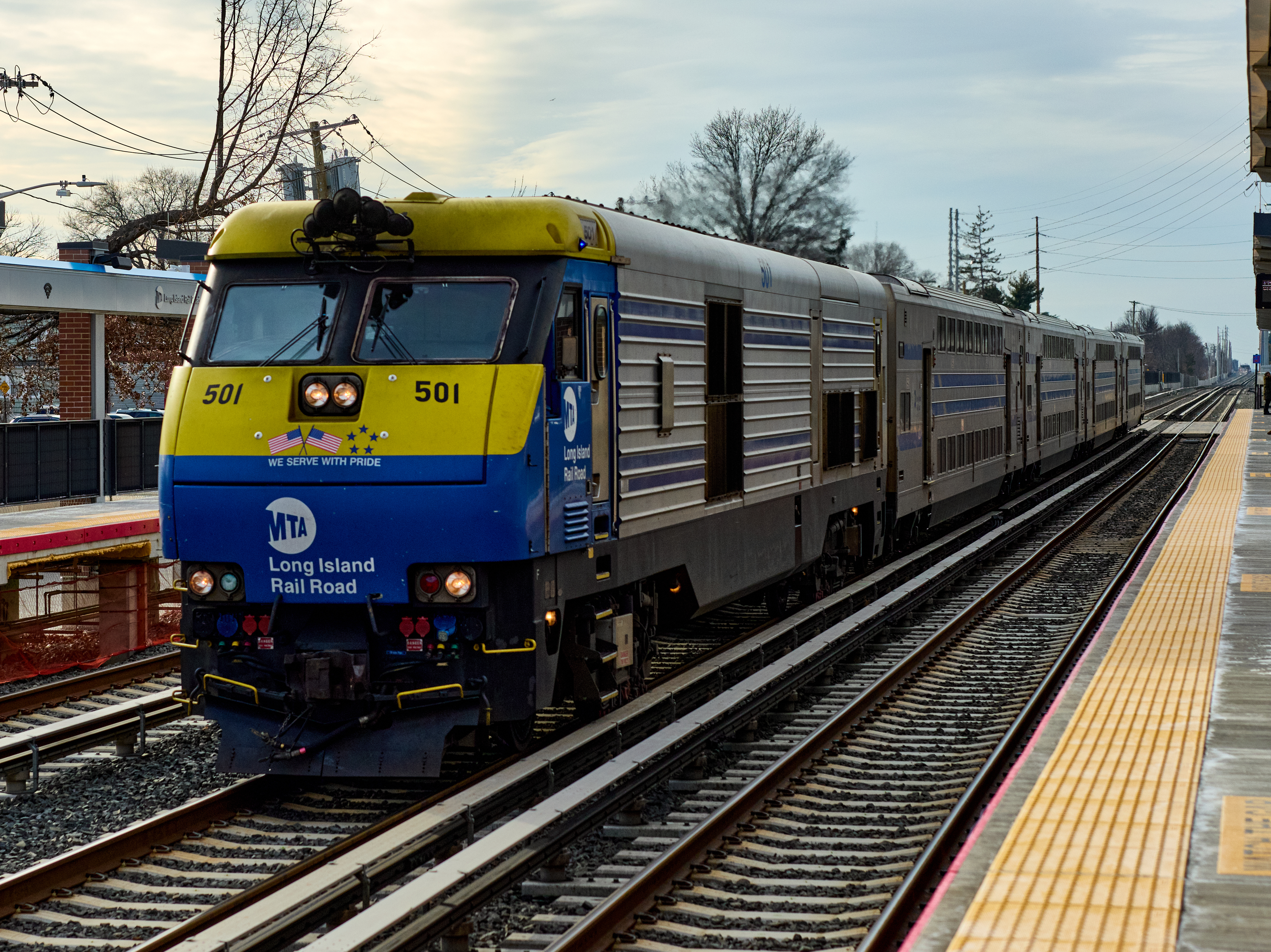
DM30AC 501 primarily diesel locomotive operating at New Hyde Park station, New York, US

This is effectively a diesel locomotive with auxiliary electric capacity for power supply from electric network (or auxiliary electric motors in case of diesel-hydraulic transmission), usually operating from a low-voltage catenary (e.g. 750 V DC third rail in the United States or 1000 V DC overhead lines in Switzerland), where non-electric traction is banned. These locomotives are generally based on conventional diesel-electric locomotives and can be converted relatively easily by adding current collectors (pantographs or contact shoes), contactors and voltage regulation equipment when powered from an electric supply. Due to the low input voltage and current limitations in electric mode, the power output on the traction motors and the maximum speed of such a locomotive are lower than when powered by a diesel engine.

The primary function for these models is to provide a "one-seat ride" (a rail trip that does not require a transfer to a different train) between the electrified and non-electrified sections of a rail system or to allow trains to run through tunnels or other segments of track where diesel locomotives are generally prohibited due to their production of exhaust.

In the United States, such locomotives (e.g. EMD FL9, GE Genesis P32AC-DM, EMD DM30AC, SC-42DM) are used for certain trains servicing the New York City terminals of Grand Central Terminal and Penn Station, as the various rail tunnels into Manhattan have exhaust restrictions. Once out of the tunnels, the engines are started and operation is as a normal diesel locomotive.

=== Full dual-mode ===
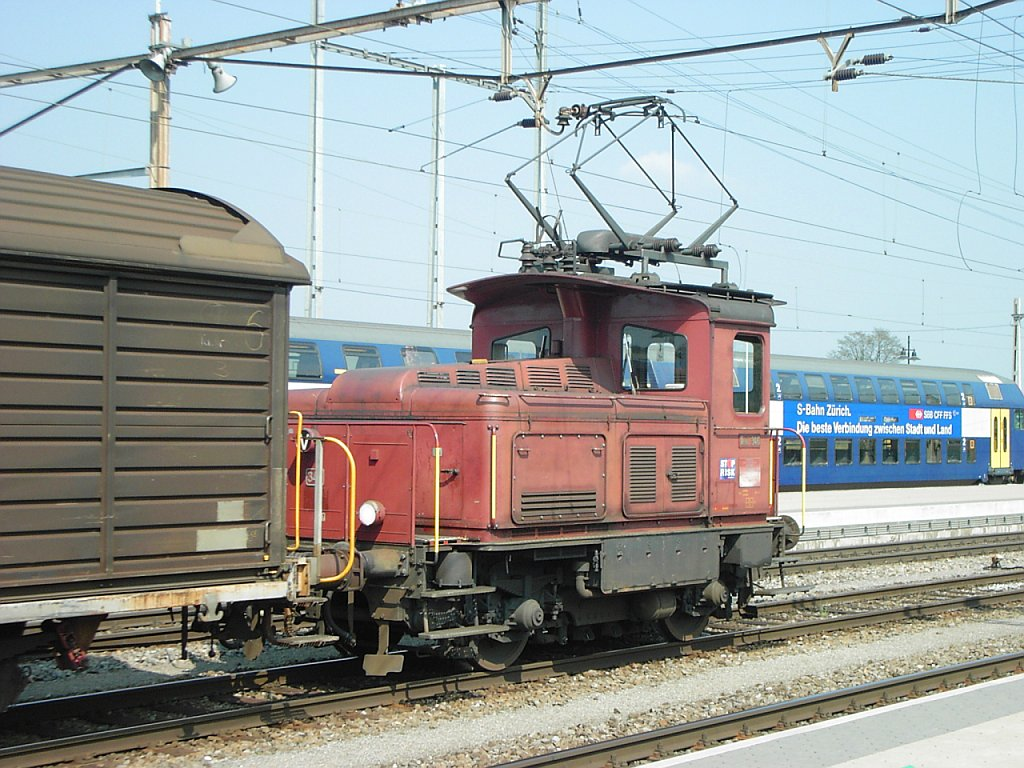
Light dual-mode (electric and diesel) shunter SBB Tem III 346 at work

This type of dual-mode locomotives has a high power and traction force at home running at high speeds both "under the wires" and under diesel power. These locomotives normally operate under pure electric traction where possible, and use the diesel engines to extend the journeys along non-electrified sections which would not be cost effective to electrify. They may also be used on long cross-country routes to take advantage of shorter sections of electrified main lines.

Historically, most mainline dual-mode locomotives have had mainly electric or mainly diesel designs, as it was difficult to fit a powerful diesel engine and powerful electric capacity into a single unit while maintaining the permissible axle load. Mostly, full-fledged dual-mode electric-diesel locomotives were either small shunting and narrow-gauge locomotives with a low-powered diesel engine, which had a comparable power outputs in electric and diesel modes, or two-unit industrial freight locomotives with separate electric and diesel sections, united by a common control system and power supply for traction electric motors (for example, Soviet quarry electric diesel locomotives OPE1 with two A-units or electric diesel locomotives OPE1A/OPE1B with the main electric A-unit and diesel B-unit).

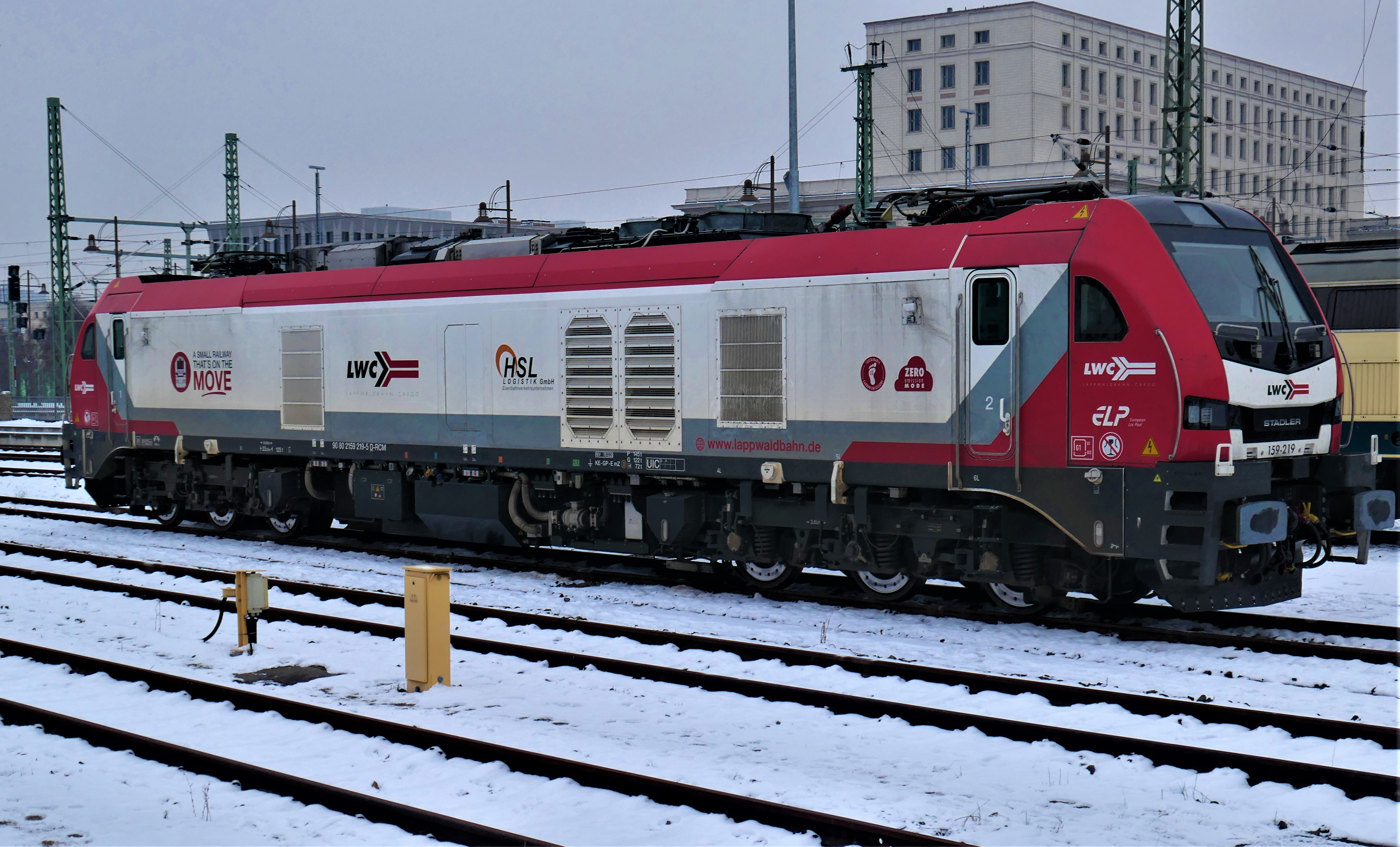
A modern full dual-mode locomotive Stadler Euro Dual 2159, no 219, at Dresden railway station, Germany

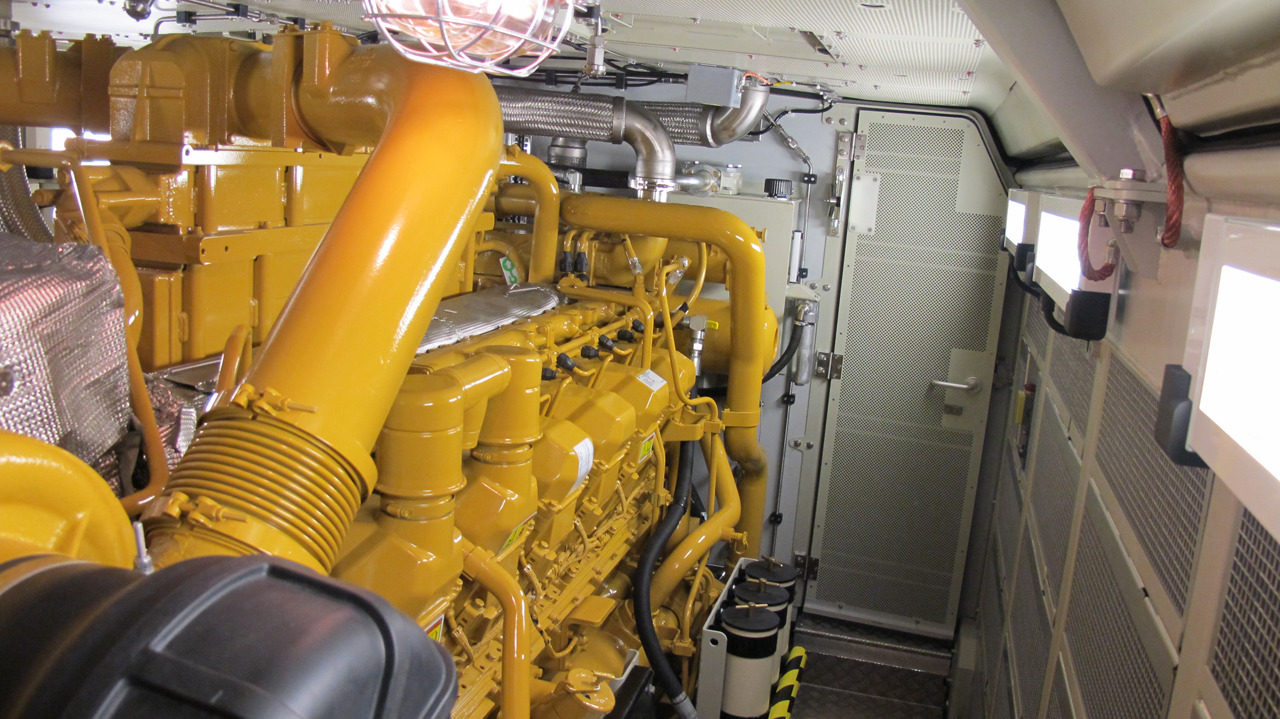
Caterpillar diesel prime mover of ALP-45DP locomotive with 1,567 kW (2,101 hp) power output

Since the 2010s, thanks to the development of technologies and the emergence of sufficiently powerful and compact high-speed turbocharged diesel engines, as well as compact power electronics, it has become possible to create single full-fledged dual-mode and even tri-mode (with battery-electro-diesel) locomotives with an acceptable axle load (e.g. Stadler Euro Dual, Bombardier ALP-45DP). With modern electronics, it is much easier to construct (or adapt) such locomotives.

The electrical equipment and the diesel generator usually occupy more or less equal space in the engine room, depending on the power and size of the diesel. Although the power output of the diesel generator and traction electric motors of such locomotives is usually significantly lower than when powered from overhead lines in pure electric mode (especially on lines with high-voltage AC electrification, and can be several times less), it is still sufficient to maintain normal speed with a train. For example, in Stadler Euro Dual locomotives, the diesel engine power can vary from 1–2.8 MW (1,300–3,800 hp) in diesel mode and up to 7 MW (9,400 hp) in electric mode.

=== Hybrid locomotive ===
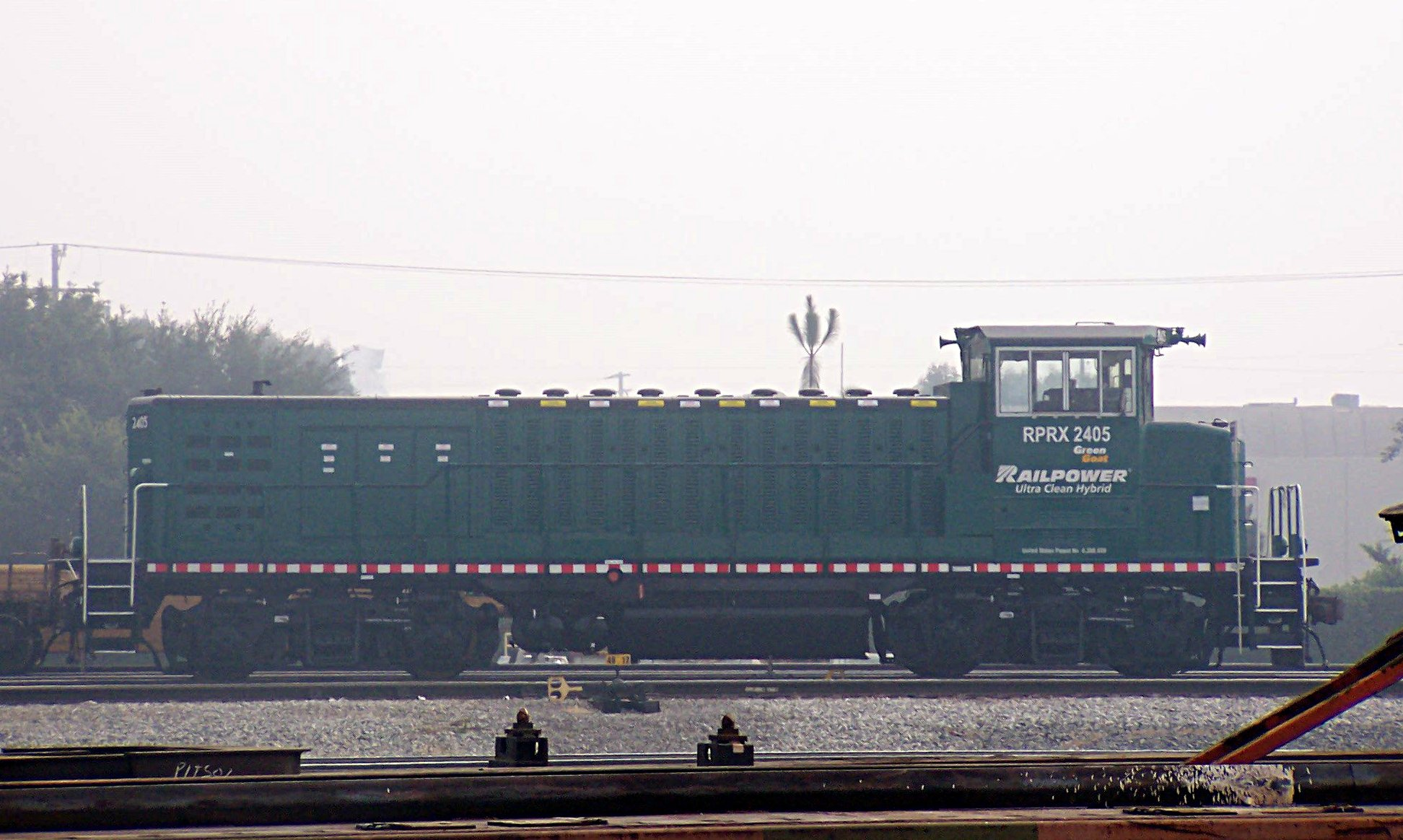
Railpower Technologies Green Goat hybrid switching locomotive GG20B

A specialized type of electro-diesel locomotive is the hybrid locomotive. Here, the electricity comes from a battery charged by the diesel engine rather than from an external supply. An example is the Green Goat switcher GG20B by Railpower Technologies, a subsidiary of R.J. Corman Railroad Group since 2009.

== List of electro-diesel locomotives by country ==
=== Europe ===
==== Georgia ====
- ETG, an experimental electro-diesel shunter with hydraulic transmission converted at Tbilisi locomotive depot in 1967 from AMG5 diesel-hydraulic shunting locomotive (manufactured by Gratz, Austria) by replacing its diesel prime mover with less powerful diesel engine and two electric motors from VL22m locomotive. The locomotive operated for several years and was withdrawn in the 1970s.

==== Germany ====
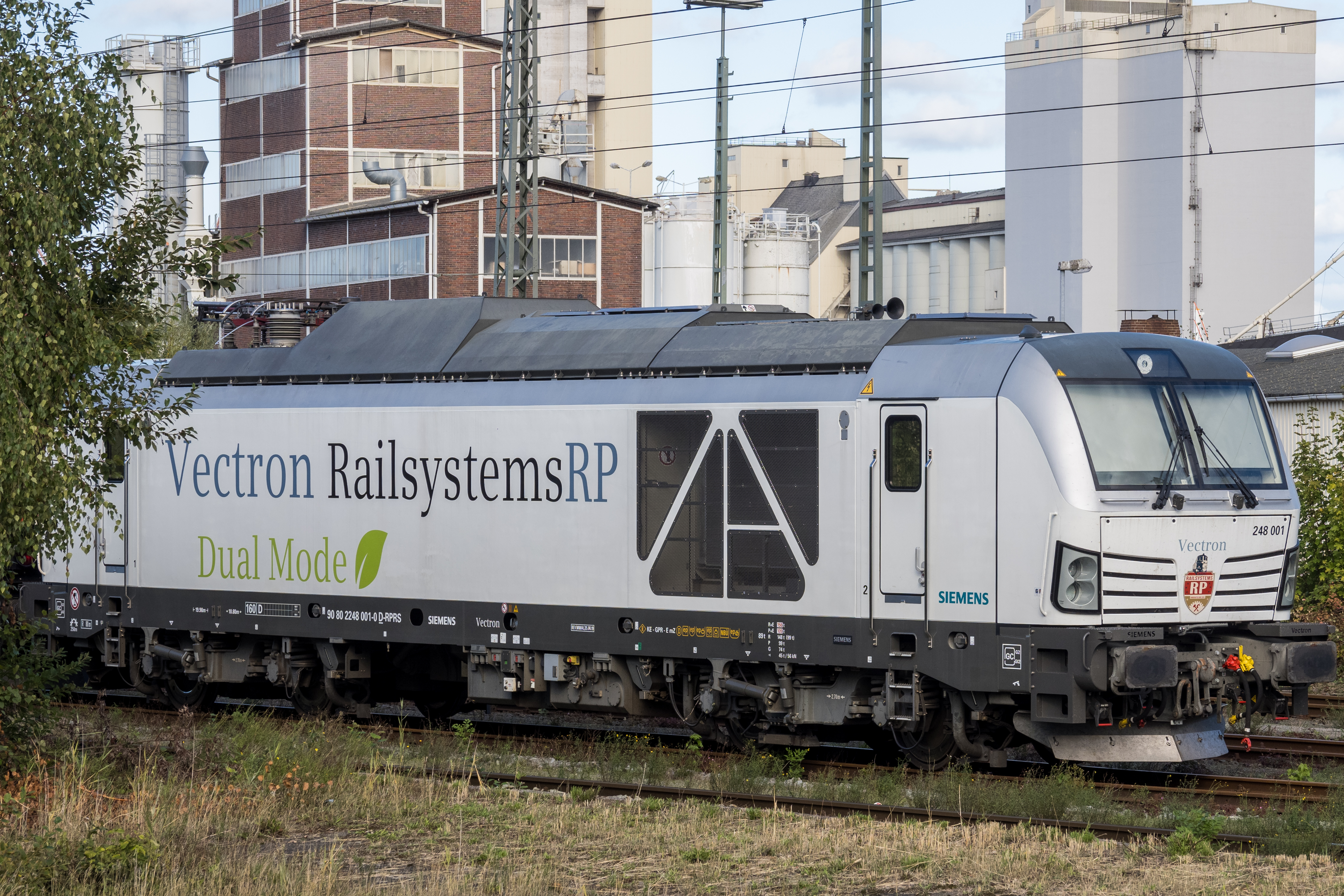
Siemens Vectron Dual Mode

- Gmeinder class 478.6 diesel and 750 V DC third-rail (bottom contact).
- Voith Futura, a 2009 CREAM Project concept locomotive rebuilt from DB 240 002.
- Bombardier TRAXX "Last Mile Diesel", mainly electric. Orders signed 2010, to be delivered probably 2012.
- Siemens Vectron Dual Mode

==== Poland ====
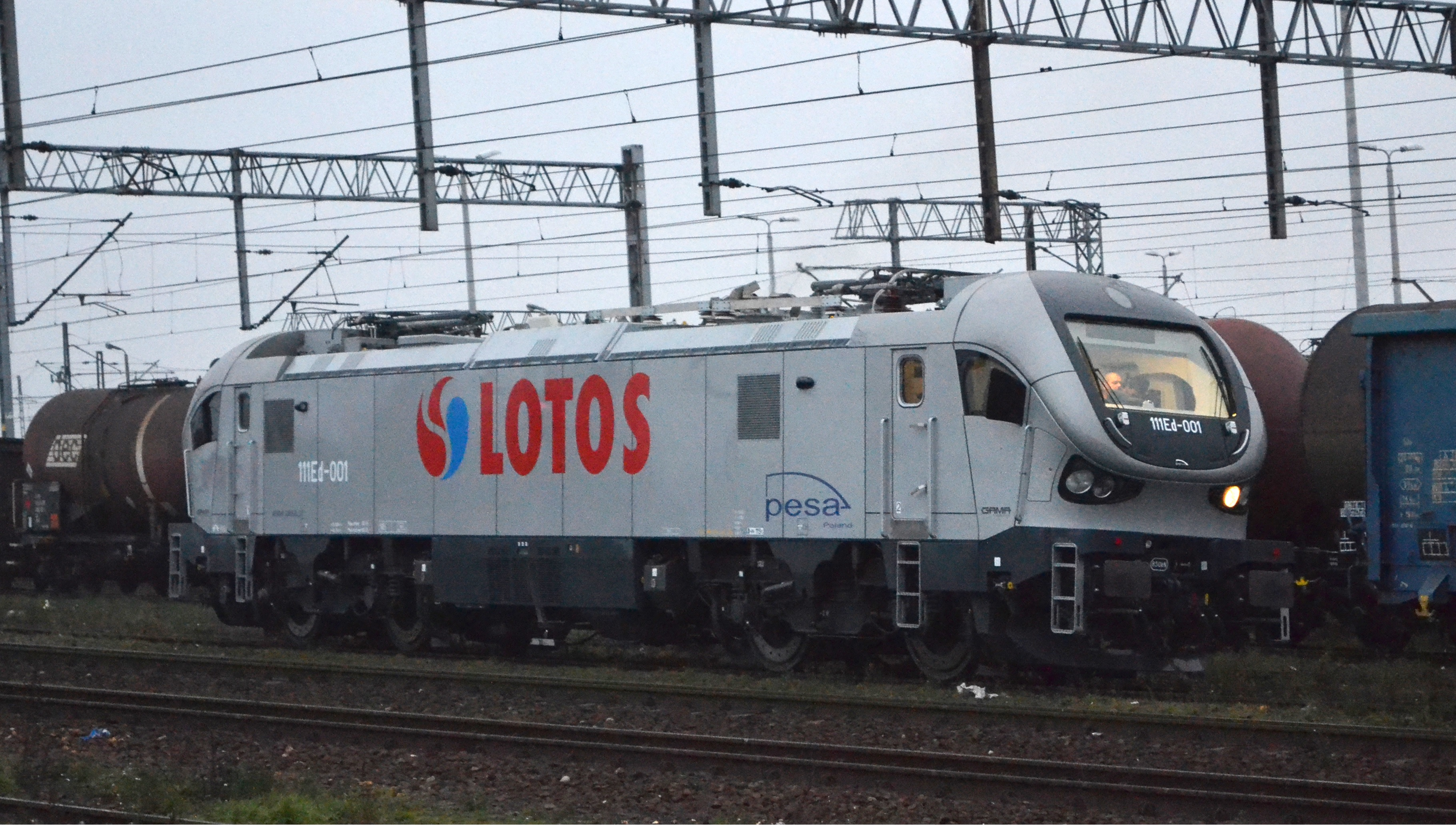
Pesa Marathon at Inowrocław, working a goods train during tests by Lotos Kolej

- Pesa 111Ed Gama Marathon – mainly electric, with auxiliary diesel engine enabling last-mile operation on non-electrified tracks. Gama Marathon was first presented in 2012 at InnoTrans Berlin. The locomotive then underwent a series of tests with rail operators Lotos Kolej (in goods traffic) and PKP Intercity (in passenger traffic), after successful conclusion it was offered on the market. In July 2015 the Polish train-operating company Locomotiv bought the prototype and signed order for further two Marathons.
- Newag Dragon – version of this electric freight locomotive for the Freightliner's Polish branch, Freightliner PL Sp. z o.o. (five units delivered in 2016) is equipped with auxiliary diesel engine.
- Newag Griffin – a version of this electric freight locomotive, leased to Lotos Kolej in 2017 for 7 years with a provision to extend the lease, is equipped with auxiliary diesel engine.

==== Russia ====
In Russia, a number of electro-diesels were built which had both pantographs and diesel prime movers. These included:

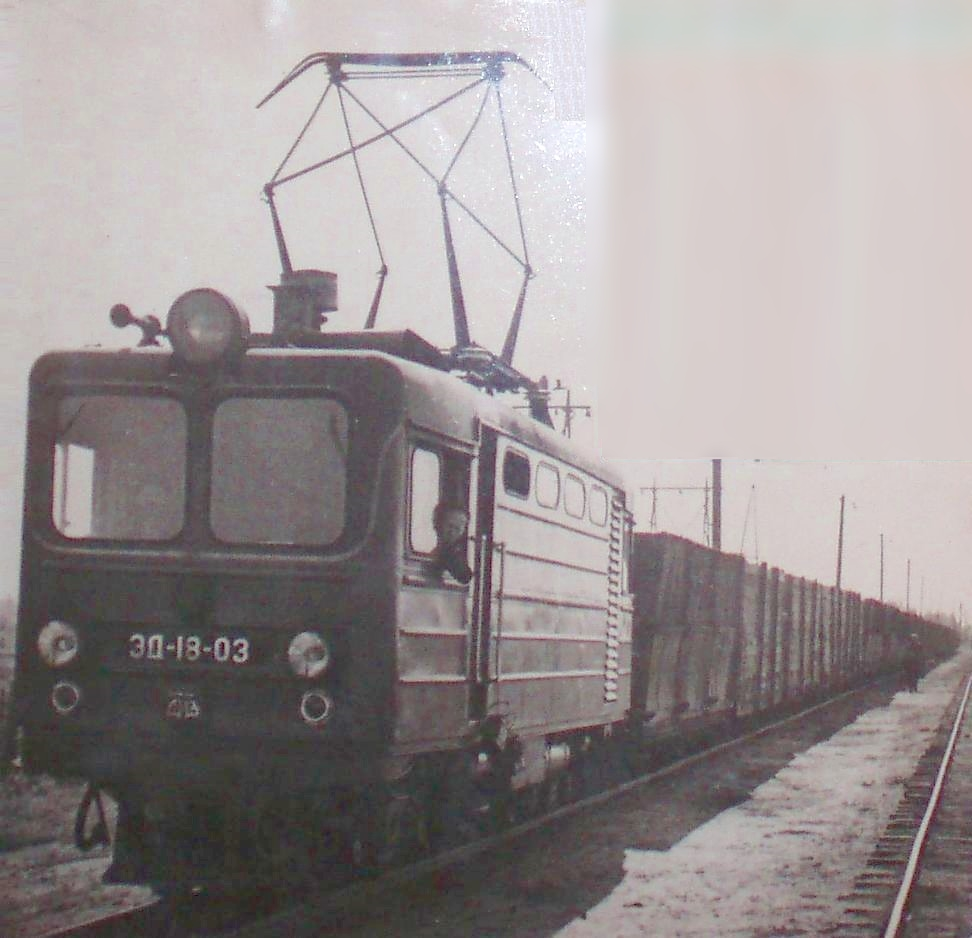
ED18 (ЭД18) electro-diesel

Narrow-gauge dual-mode locomotives:

- ED16 (ЭД16), ED18 (ЭД18), and TEU1 (ТЭУ1) experimental narrow gauge light dual-mode shunters models for 750 mm gauge railways with 6 kV 50 Hz AC overhead wires, produced by Demikhovo Machinebuilding Plant

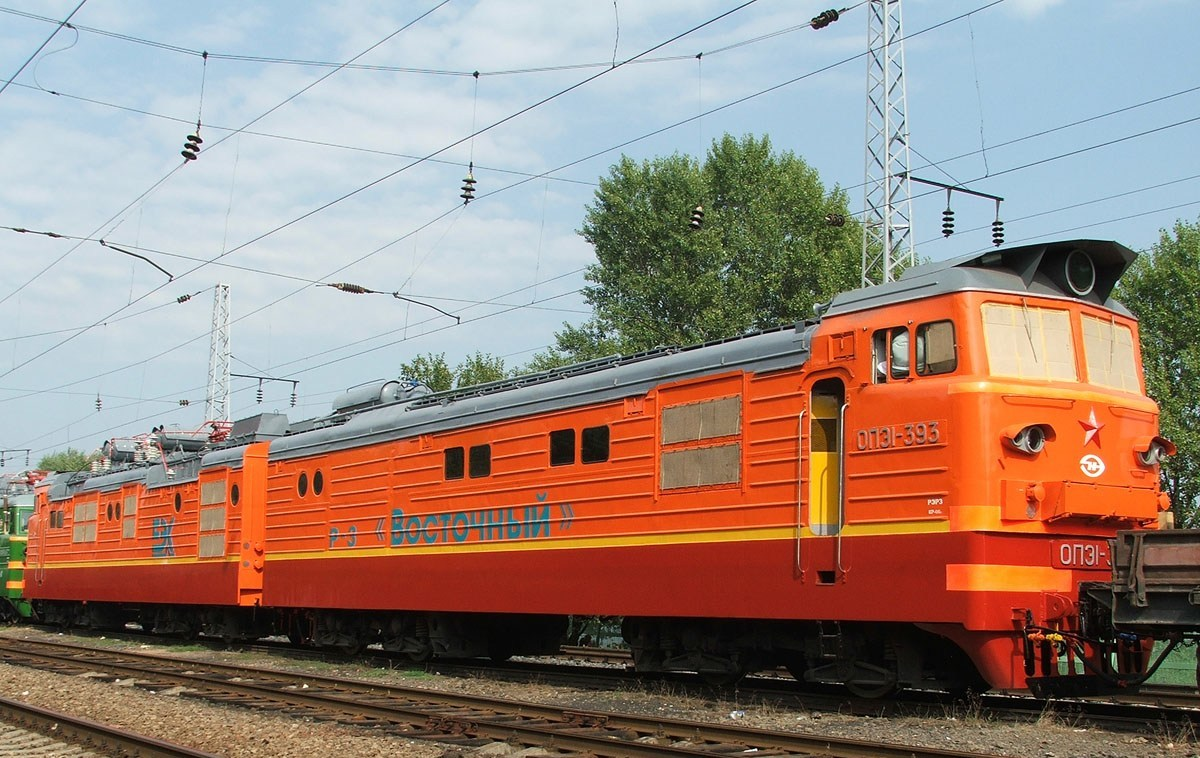
RZD two-unit industrial quarry OPE1 electro-diesel locomotive

Industrial freight locomotives:

- OPE1 (ОПЭ1), full dual-mode freight locomotives, used mostly in quarries and some another industrial railways with 10 kV 50 Hz AC overhead wires, produced by Novocherkassk Electric Locomotive Plant. Each locomotive consists of two sections with dedicated electric and diesel power equipment, which can operate as a standalone single-ended electric or diesel locomotives, some of them are also equipped with a motorized dump car.
- OPE1A (ОПЭ1А), OPE1B (ОПЭ1Б) and PE3T (ПЭ3Т), full dual-mode freight steeplecab locomotives for quarry railways with overhead wires with 10 kV 50 Hz AC electrification (OPE1A/B) or 1.5 / 3 kV DC (PE3T), produced by Dnipro Electric Locomotive Plant, Ukraine. A complete locomotive consists of - primarily electric A unit with a cab, one diesel-electric B-unit with a lowered body and one motorized dump car, however most OPE1A locomotives were produced without diesel B-units and with two motorized dump cars.
- LEW EL10 EL20, mainly electric locomotives for quarry railways with 10 kV 50 Hz AC overhead wires. Each locomotive is equipped with two motorized dump cars.

Mainline freight locomotives:

- 2EV120, mainly electric two-unit freight locomotive, produced by Engels Locomotive Plant and derived from Bombardier TRAXX. Locomotive using both 3 kV DC and 25 kV 50 Hz overhead wires and can be equipped with auxiliary "Last Mile Diesel".

==== Spain ====
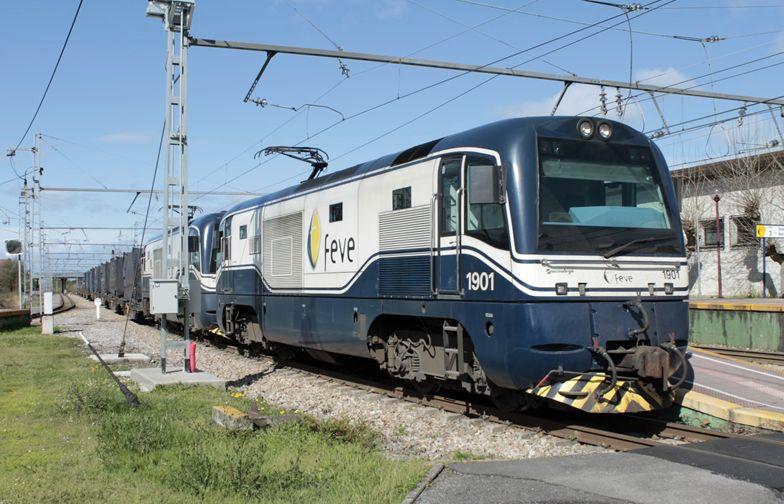
Double FEVE electro-diesel locomotive 1915 at El Berrón (Spain)

- FEVE 1900 series, 1500 V DC overhead wires. This series was rebuilt by FEVE from the 1000 Series locomotives.
- Euskotren TD2000 series, 1500 V DC overhead wires. This is a new construction locomotive. Built by CFD-Bagnères and Ingeteam.
- CAF Bitrac 3600, 3000 V DC overhead wires. October 2007 order for nine freight Co-Co locomotives. Available in Bo-Bo and Co-Co wheel configuration, 1,435 or 1,668 mm (56.5 or 65.7 in) gauge, and as freight or passenger versions of 120 and 180 km/h (75 and 112 mph) maximum speeds respectively.

==== Switzerland ====
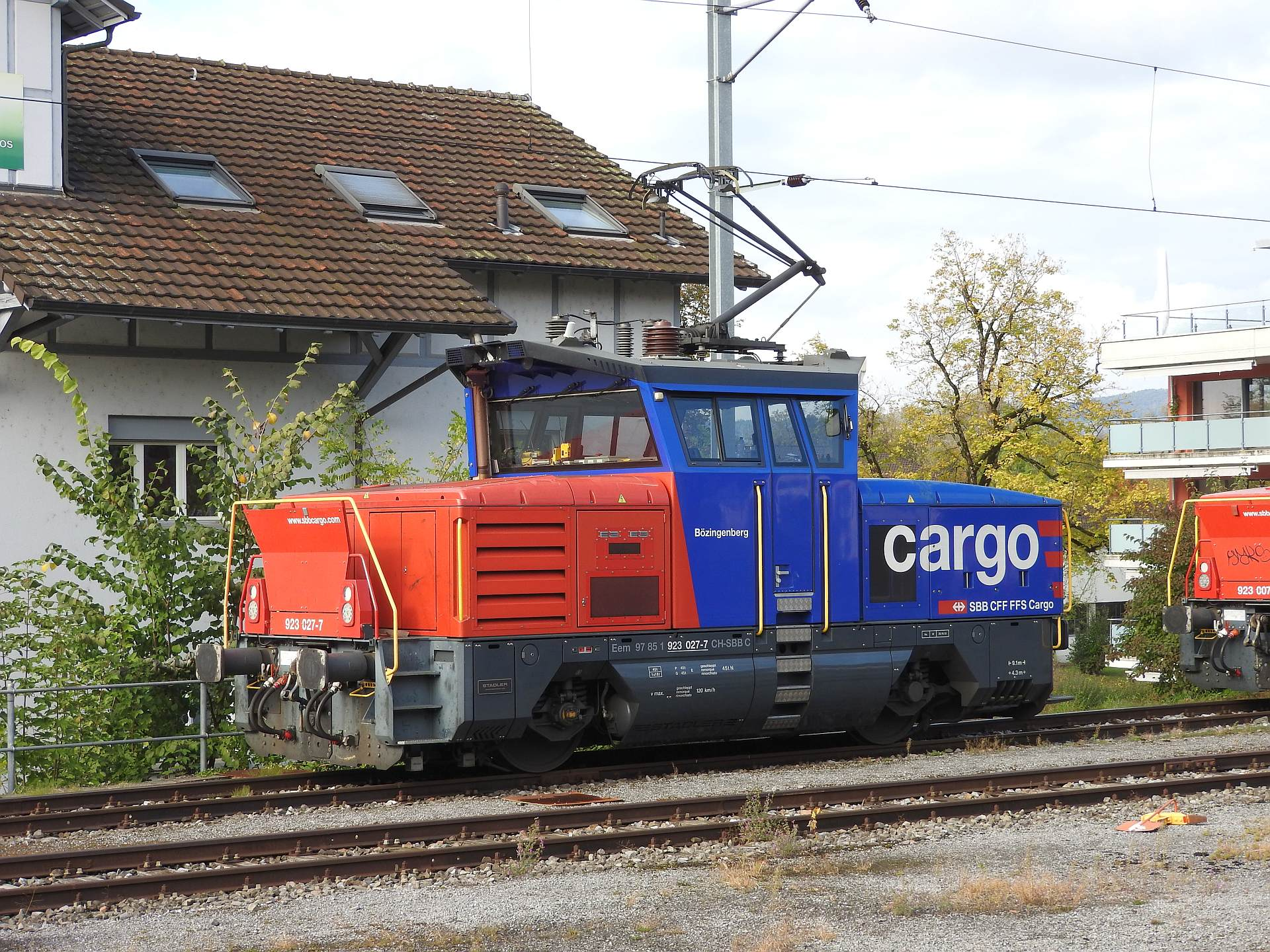
SBB Eem 923

- Rhaetian Railway Gem 4/4 801 and 802, 1000 V DC overhead wires (Bernina Railway), primarily diesel. The power output of the Gem 4/4s at the wheels is 780 kilowatts (1,050 hp) in diesel operation, and 680 kilowatts (910 hp) under the DC wires.
- Swiss Federal Railways Tem I 251–275 (1950–57), Tem II 276–298 (1967) and Tem III 321–365 (1954–62) light dual-mode shunters (Tem III see image) of which only few are still in service.
- Swiss Federal Railways Eem 923 primarily electric shunters using both 15 kV 16.7 Hz and 25 kV 50 Hz overhead wires and a 360 kW auxiliary diesel engine are on delivery from Stadler Rail's Winterthur plant.

==== United Kingdom ====
Electro-diesel subway locomotives for London Underground include:

- DEL120, an experimental electro-diesel locomotive which was built by London Underground in 1940 but was not a success. It was designed to use its diesel engine when in the open air, but to draw current from the third and fourth rail when underground.

Electro-diesel locomotives whose electricity source is 650 — 750V DC third rail include:

- British Rail Class 73, dating from 1962 – the more successful design, with some still in regular use. They originally were primarily electric locomotives that had 1,600 hp (1,193 kW) power output in electric, and only 600 hp (447 kW) power output in the diesel mode, later re-engined to provide a similar 1,600 hp (1,193 kW) diesel power. (2020, 64 years since introduction)
- British Rail Class 74 – primarily electric locomotives rebuilt from British Rail Class 71 electric locomotives in 1967 and withdrawn by 1977.

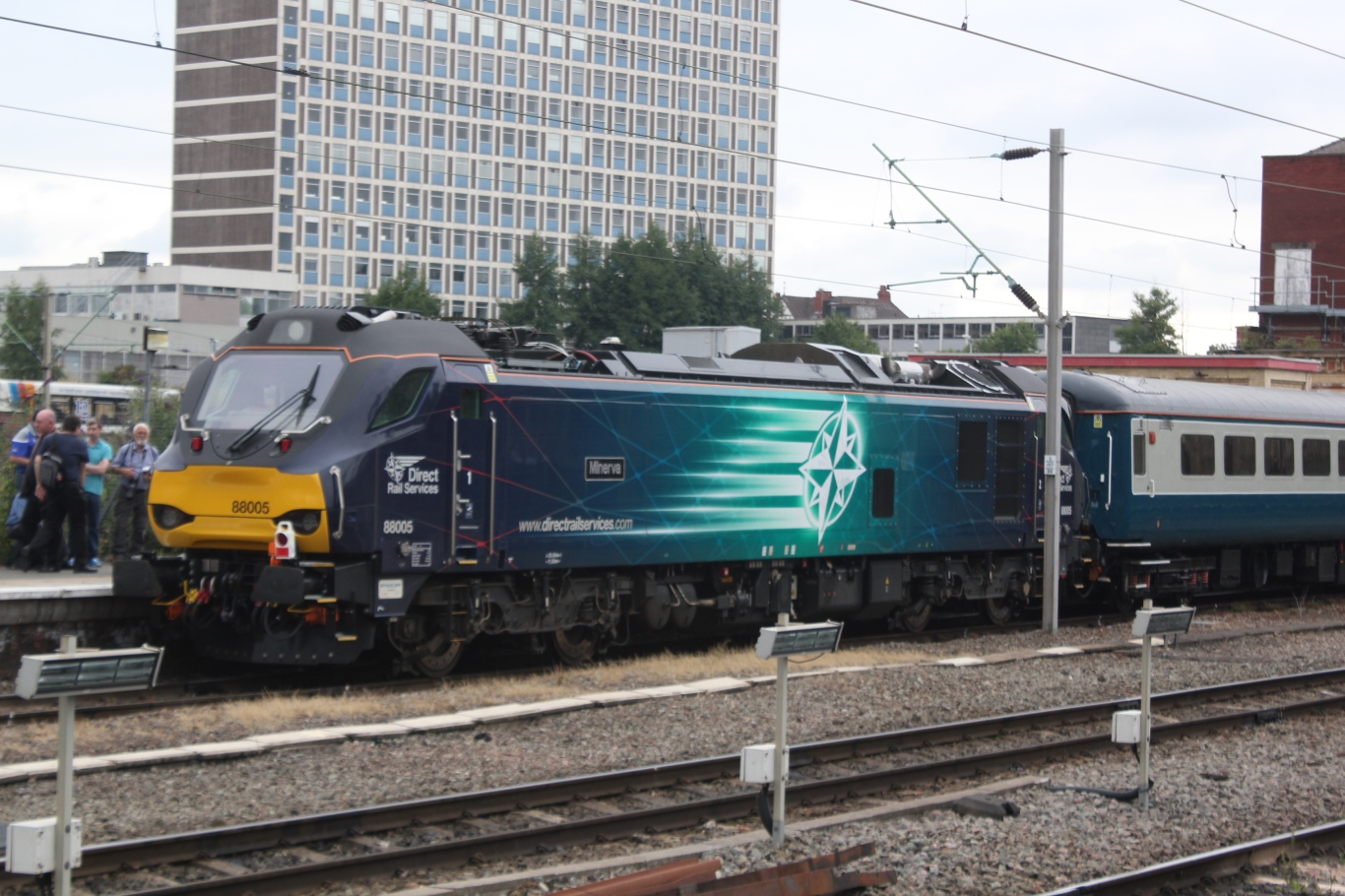
DRS Class 88 at Crewe with a charter train

Electro-diesel locomotives whose electricity source is 25 kV 50 Hz AC overhead line include:

- British Rail Class 88 – primarily electric locomotive used by Direct Rail Services, a part of the Stadler Euro Dual family. Introduced in 2017. It has 4,000 kW (5,400 hp) power output in electric and 700 kW (940 hp) in diesel mode.
- British Rail Class 93 – tri-mode battery-electro-diesel locomotive used by Rail Operations Group, a part of the Stadler Euro Dual family. Introduced in 2022. Three different power sources are used to power the locomotive – 4,000 kW (5,400 hp) 25 kV AC overhead electric power, or a 900 kW (1,200 hp) diesel engine supplemented by a 400 kW (540 hp) battery – allowing the locomotive to be used on both electrified and non-electrified lines.
- British Rail Class 99 – full dual-mode electro-diesel locomotive, a part of the Stadler Euro Dual family. It has 6,170 kW (8,270 hp) power output in electric and 1,790 kW (2,400 hp) in diesel mode. The locomotives are expected to enter service in 2026.

=== North America ===
==== Canada ====
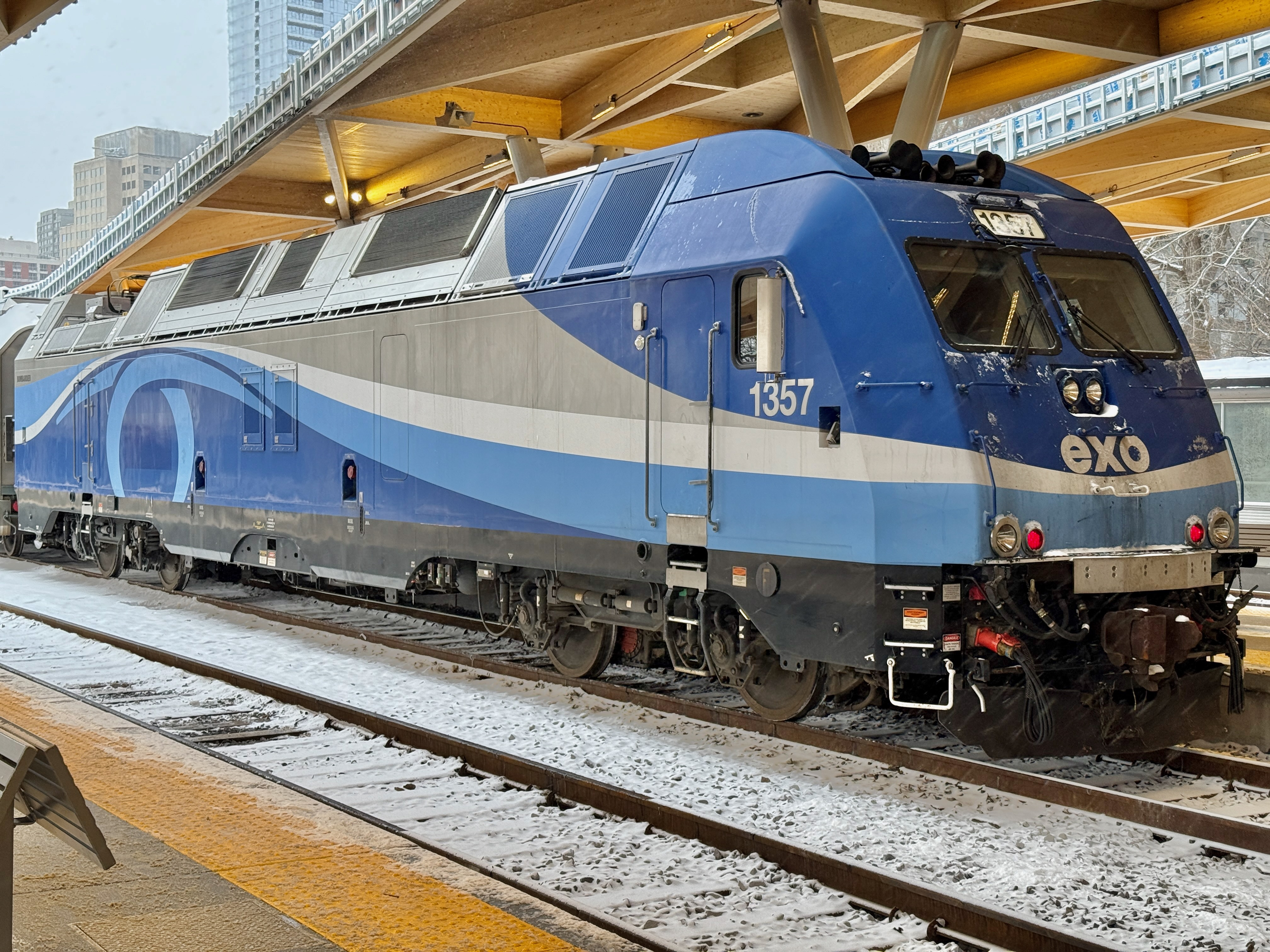
Bombardier ALP-45DP of Exo at Lucien L'Allier station in Montreal

- Bombardier ALP-45DP – 20 fully dual-mode locomotives ordered for the Mascouche line (Exo) in a joint order with NJ Transit. They provided a through journey on this mostly unelectrified new line, which joins the existing electrified Deux-Montagnes line to access Montreal's Central Station through the poorly ventilated, 25 kV AC electric only Mount Royal Tunnel. However, in January 2020, the electrified portion of the Exo network was permanently closed to enable the construction of the Réseau express métropolitain, so the locomotives now operate exclusively in diesel mode.

==== United States ====
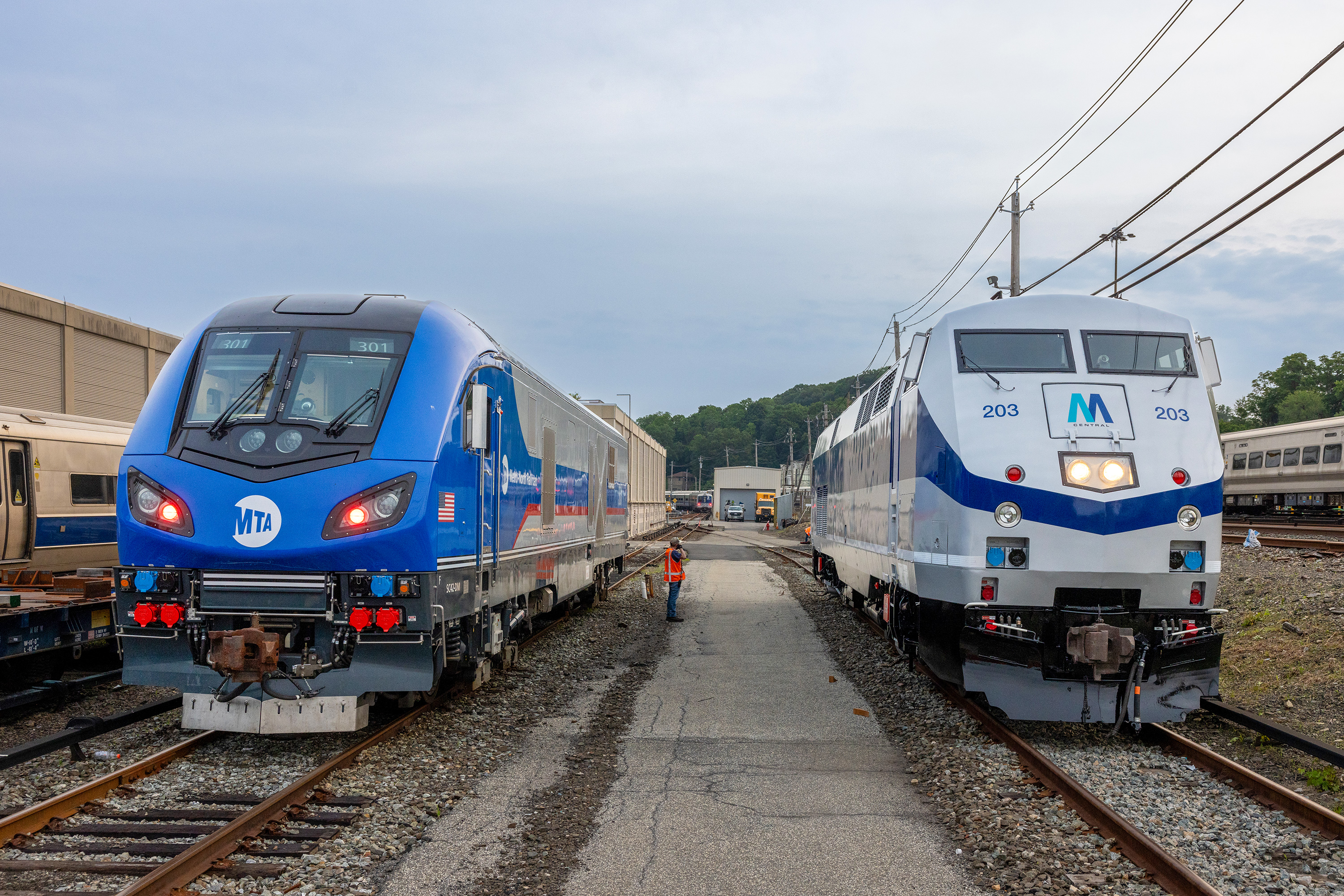
Metro-North's Siemens Charger SC-42DM and GE Genesis P32AC-DM

Several, primarily diesel locomotive types and a multiple-unit have been built to operate off a 750 V DC third rail into the New York City terminals of Grand Central Terminal and Penn Station (with the third rail system being rarely used on open-air tracks).

The following are in service:

- P32AC-DM – dual-mode version of GE Genesis, primarily diesel, used by Amtrak and Metro-North Railroad. Electric mode is only used for service to Grand Central Terminal from Poughkeepsie or Wassaic, or Penn Station from Albany, Rutland, or Niagara Falls. They are also used on the Albany-New York section of trains between Penn Station and Chicago, Montreal, and Toronto. Those trains stop in Albany to switch to full diesel GE Genesis for the remainder of the journey.
- EMD DM30AC – specific to Long Island Rail Road, primarily diesel, electric mode is only used for service to Penn Station.
- SC-42DM – dual-mode version of Siemens Charger, primarily diesel, introduced in 2024. These locomotives are operated by the Metro-North Railroad and Connecticut Department of Transportation (CTDOT) and are positioned as the main replacement for P32AC-DM. The Long Island Rail Road has also expressed interest in purchasing these locomotives to replace its DE30AC and DM30AC locomotives. Unlike its predecessor P32AC-DMs, which operate on electric power only on short sections in Manhattan, the SC42-DMs can operate in electric mode on the entire network with a third rail electrification.
- Bombardier/Alstom ALP-45DP – 60 full dual-mode locomotives purchased by NJ Transit, to bridge gaps between non-electrified and electrified sections of track into New York Penn Station. These trains have been used to provide a "one-seat ride" to New York Penn Station for commuters using non-electrified portions of the system. Includes 35 original ALP-45DP locomotives, plus 25 locomotives designated ALP-45A. An additional 12 ALP-45A locomotives are on order. Newer locomotives are built by Alstom since 2021, following Alstom's acquisition of Bombardier.

The following were retired from New York City service:

- Baldwin RP-210 – primarily diesel-hydraulic, third-rail electric mode for short-term use only. All scrapped.
- Fairbanks Morse P-12-42 – primarily diesel-electric, third-rail electric mode for short-term use only. All scrapped.
- EMD FL9 – primarily diesel-electric, third-rail electric mode for short-term use only. Several examples preserved and/or in service on heritage railroads.
- GE three-power boxcab – tri-mode switcher locomotive model built in 1930, was also capable of operating as a battery locomotive. All retired and scrapped.

=== Africa ===
==== South Africa ====
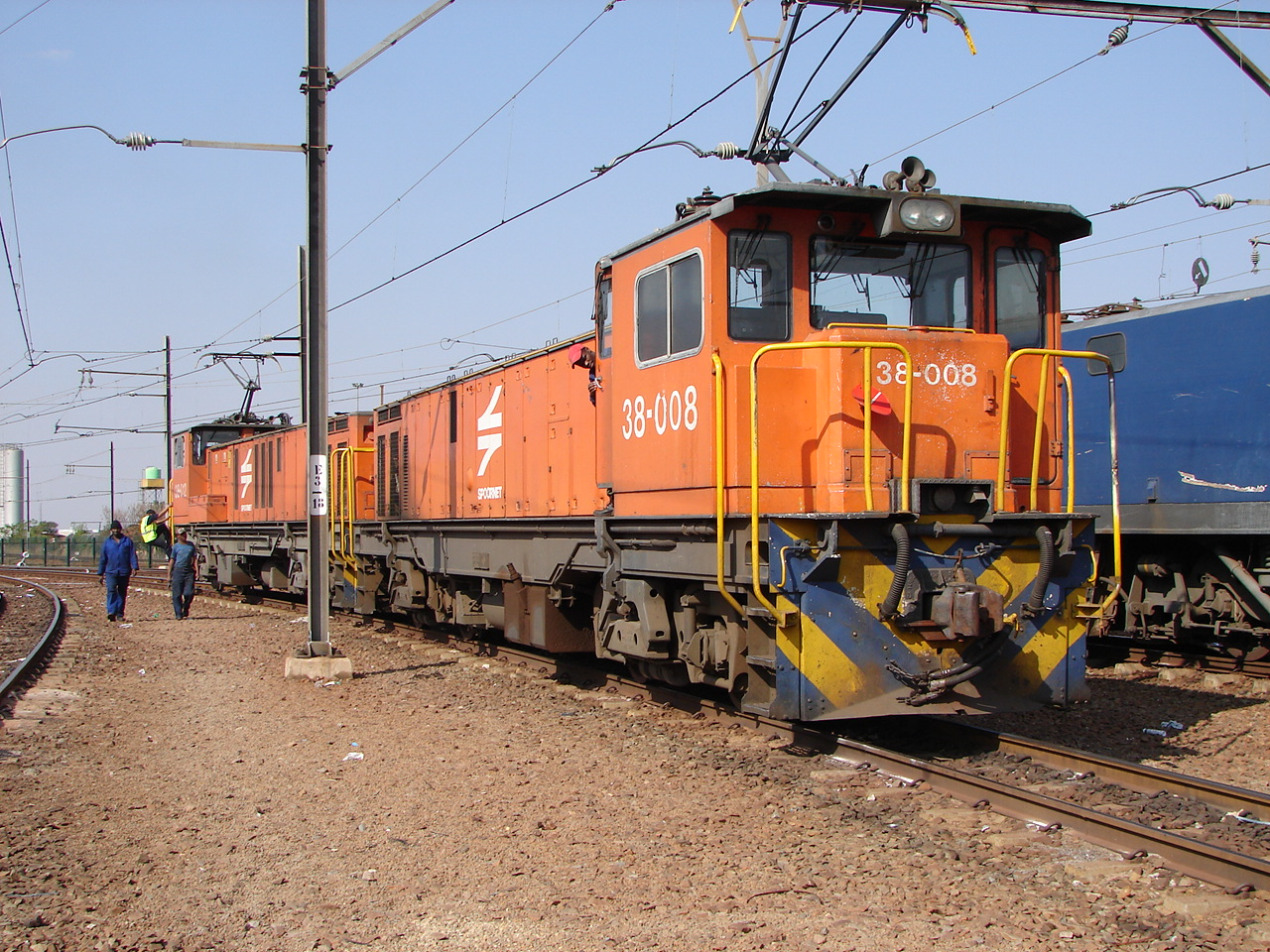
Spoornet Class 38-000 38-008 in electric mode at Sentrarand, Gauteng, ZA

- The South African Class 38-000 is a 3 kV DC electro-diesel locomotive designed by Consortium under the leadership of Siemens and built by Union Carriage and Wagon (UCW) in Nigel, Gauteng, South Africa. Between November 1992 and 1993 fifty of these locomotives were placed in service by Spoornet, formerly the South African Railways (SAR) and later renamed Transnet Freight Rail (TFR). The diesel engine enables the locomotive to shunt on unelectrified sidings.

==== Tanzania ====
- Stadler Euro Dual, proposed 25 kV 50 Hz AC overhead wires (Tanzania Standard Gauge Railway)

=== Asia ===
==== China ====
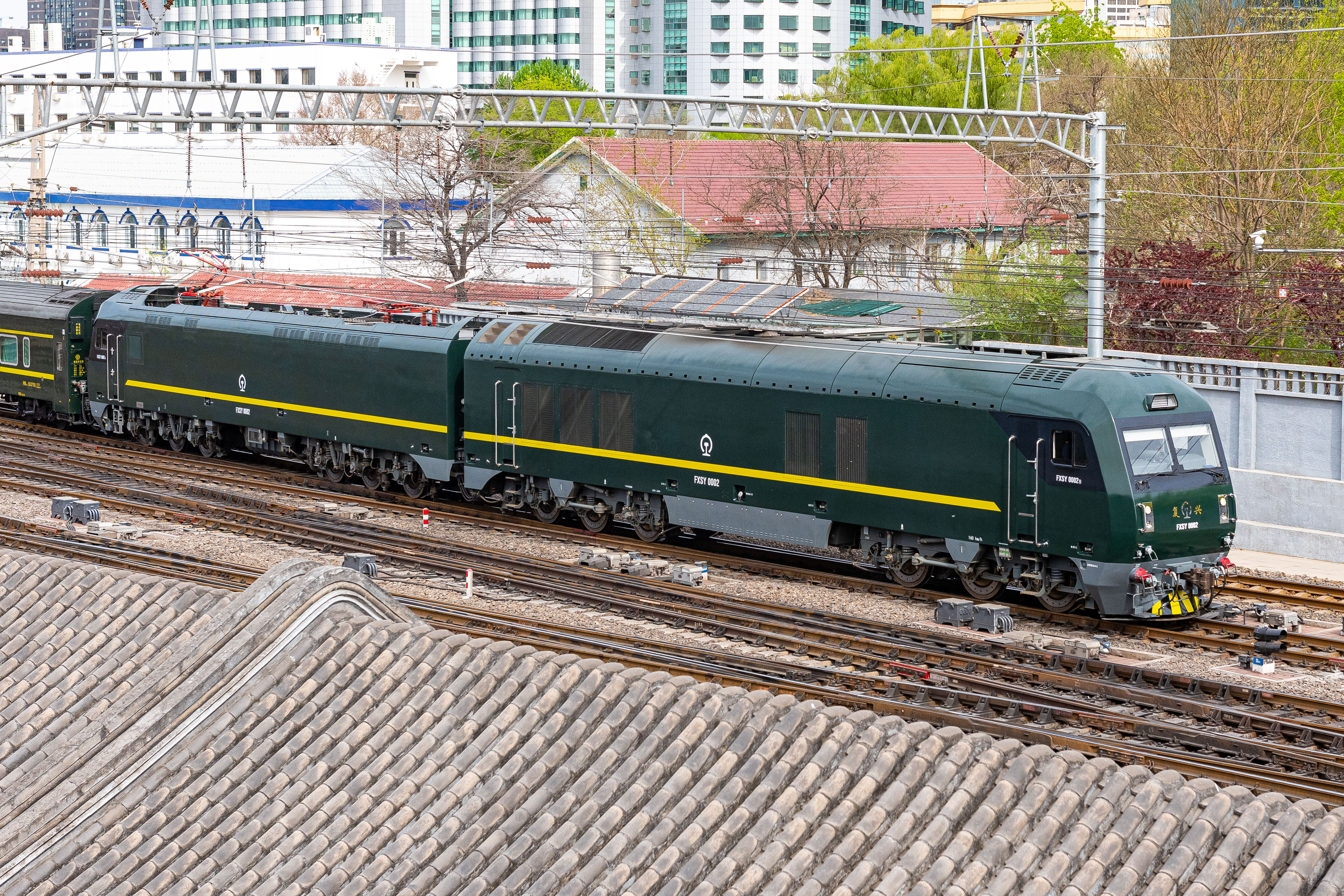
A China Railway FXSY at Beijing railway station

Two electro-diesel locomotive models has been manufactured: FXSY and FXSY3.

==== India ====
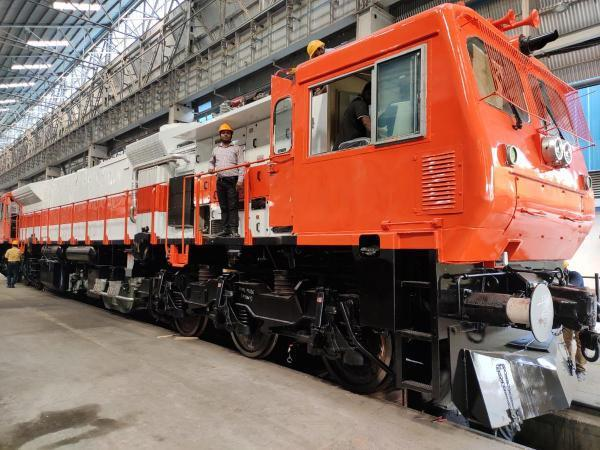
The only unit of the class WDAP -5 locomotive at BLW workshop.

- The class WDAP-5 is a dual-mode locomotive that was turned out in March 2020 by the Banaras Locomotive Works (BLW) for Indian Railways. The model name stands for wide gauge (W), Diesel (D), AC Current (A), Passenger (P) and Horsepower (5). The locomotive delivers 5500HP in electric mode and 4500HP in diesel mode and has achieved speeds of up to 150 km/h (93 mph). The purpose of the locomotive was to allow passenger trains to continue into unelectrified sections without having to switch to a diesel locomotive, improving their punctuality. However, the stoppage of regular train services due to the COVID-19 pandemic allowed the railways to rapidly electrify their network, rendering this locomotive useless. The only unit produced (numbered 71000), never entered commercial service. It is stored in Tughlakabad loco shed.

== Alternatives ==
As an alternative to electro-diesel locomotives, some railways used mixed consists of electric and diesel locomotives, or a locomotive and a trailer power car of a different type, coupled and connected with a multiple unit train control system. Typically such multiple working is not supported by the locomotive control system, which allows to operate only locomotives of a similar type (either electric or diesel), since a typical electric and diesel-electric locomotive does not have the necessary buttons and monitoring devices on its control panels to operate power equipment of a paired locomotive with another power type, and a multiple unit electric code protocol does not support all necessary signals. However, locomotives can be modified and equipped with additional controls in driver's cab and remote control equipment to allow dual-mode operation with a locomotive or power trailer with another power source.

=== Pair of electric and diesel locomotives ===
In rare cases, an electric and a diesel-electric locomotive can be modified with additional remote control equipment and coupled in mixed dual-mode pairs with the ability to control power source and traction equipment of a paired locomotive. Unlike full-fledged two-unit electro-diesel locomotives (for example, OPE1 or OPE1A), where the electric circuits of the traction motors of both electric and diesel sections are united into a common network regardless of the energy source used, in locomotives in a married pair they are completely independent, and only the control system can be combined.

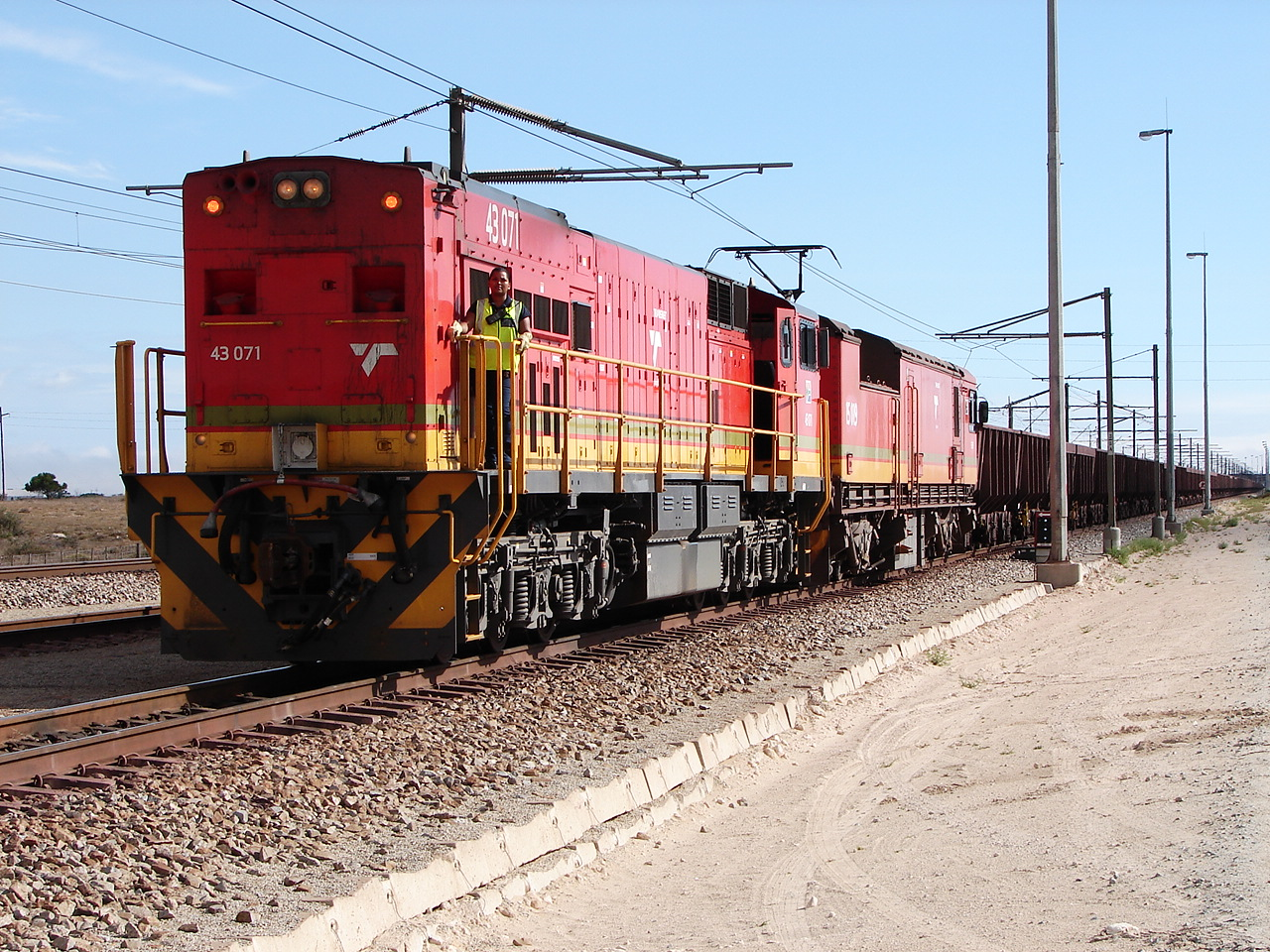
A pair of Class 43 diesel-electric and 15E electric locomotives combined with a multiple unit train control operating with a freight train on Sishen–Saldanha Orex line, South Africa

In South Africa on the Sishen–Saldanha Orex line, Class 9E and Class 15E electric locomotives run in mixed consists with GE Class 34 series (Classes 34-000, 34-400, 34-500 and 34-900) and Class 43-000 diesel-electric locomotives to haul the 342-wagon and almost 4-km long iron ore trains. Although this line is completely electrified with high voltage 50 kV AC overhead lines, electrical sub-stations are located very sparsely with large gaps between each other, which can cause huge voltage drops, so their power is insufficient to supply only electric locomotives in sufficient quantity to pull such a long and heavy trains, but the partial usage of diesel locomotives allows to solve this problem Each Class 9E or Class 15E electric locomotive is equipped with controls for diesel locomotive power equipment and serves as the master of each mixed consist, controlling its respective diesel-electric companions by means of a Slimkabel (smart cable). Each locomotive set usually consists of two or three locomotives, including one or two Class 9E or 15E electric and one or two Class 34 or 43-000 diesel-electric locomotives. In effect, each ore train is therefore made up of three separate 114-wagon trains consisted together, with the locomotives of all three trains and the pusher locomotive at the rear end all controlled by means of a Locotrol radio distributed power control system by one crew in the leading electric locomotive.

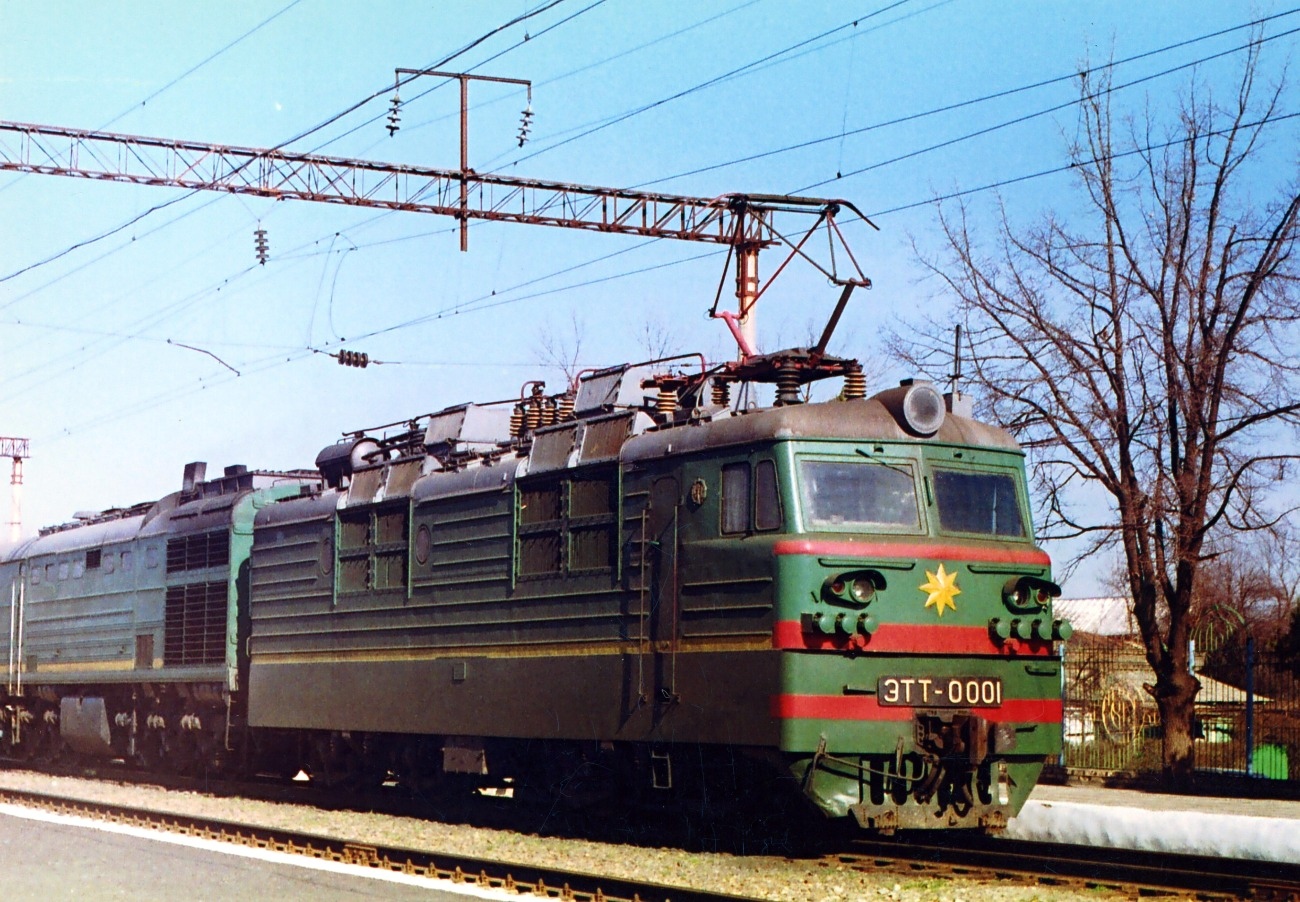
A married pair of VL80S electric and 2TE10M diesel-electric locomotive units designated as ETT-0001 in Jizzakh, Uzbekistan.

In Uzbekistan in 2000, as an experiment to reduce the travel time of passenger trains, a single unit of a two-unit VL80S electric locomotive and a single unit of a two-unit 2TE10M diesel-electric locomotive were coupled in a semi-permanent consist, which was designated as a pseudo-electro-diesel locomotive ETT-0001. Initially these locomotives had completely different analog controls and electrical circuits, incompatible with each other, so control panels and electrical cables were taken from withdrawn locomotives of the same classes and duplicated in driver's cabins of each other locomotives on secondman's left part of the cabin. This coupling worked for several years on the Tashkent — Samarkand route with passenger trains: the train was pulled by the VL80S electric locomotive from Tashkent to Jizzakh, and by the 2TE10M diesel-electric locomotive from Jizzakh to Samarkand. After 2003, the electrification of the route to Samarkand was completed, and the coupling was disbanded, since it was no longer needed.

In the United Kingdom, after the electrification of the East Coast Main Line in 1987, British Rail has decided to test new Class 91 locomotives in passenger service with loco-hauled Mark 3 carriages and Class 43 diesel-electric locomotives (power cars) taken from Intercity 125 (HST) diesel trainsets as surrogate driving van trailers, thus forming a push-pull dual-mode trainsets, because the new Mark 4 carriages with driving van trailers for these locomotives were not going to be finished in time. In order to provide a compatibility with Class 91 locomotives and buffered loco-hauled coaches, eight Class 43 power cars were modified through the removing of their lower valancing in favour of buffers and installing an additional time-division multiplexing remote control equipment which was also added to the Class 91 locomotives, so each locomotive could be controlled by its mate. At first, only electric locomotives were used for traction, while the diesel engines of the Class 43's were used only to supply head-end power to the passenger carriages. However, a long-term idling of diesel engines caused them to catch oil fire, and to prevent this, the Class 43's were also started to be used for traction in addition to the electric locomotive, working in mixed power mode and giving the Class 91's an extra boost when departing stations. These sets worked on the line between 1987 and 1991, when the first Mark 4 carriages including DVTs became available and entered service. After this, the Class 43 power cars were returned to regular operations with HST sets, and their remote control systems for electric locomotives were removed.

In China, two CR200JS-G electro-diesel push-pull trainsets were built in 2021 for plateau operation, as part of CR200J Fuxing electric train family. Each train consists of HXD1D-J electric locomotive (power car) with 7200 kW power output on wheels at one end, FXN3-J two-unit diesel locomotive (two power cars) with 2×2700 kW power output on wheels (or 2×3500 kW on engines) at another end, and nine 25-T passenger coaches sandwiched between them. Electric and diesel power cars have their own independent traction motor circuits, but can be operated from cabs of each other via a digital train communication network. HXD1D-J is a special version of a conventional HXD1D electric locomotive manufactured by CRRC Zhuzhou Locomotive, and FXN3-J is a special version of a FXN3 two-unit diesel-electric locomotive manufactured by CRRC Dalian – both of them have modified body design with only one driver's cab and new aerodynamic shape and are adapted for joint operation as part of a train. These trains are served on Sichuan–Tibet railway.

=== Pair of locomotive and power car ===
Some locomotives can be coupled with a powerful enough trailer head-end power car (diesel-generator car for electric or pantograph and transformer car for diesel-electric locomotive). A single-mode locomotive, as in the other case, is equipped with additional control panels for remotely operating this trailer and power cables for receiving power from it, which allows it to be used as a dual-mode locomotive.

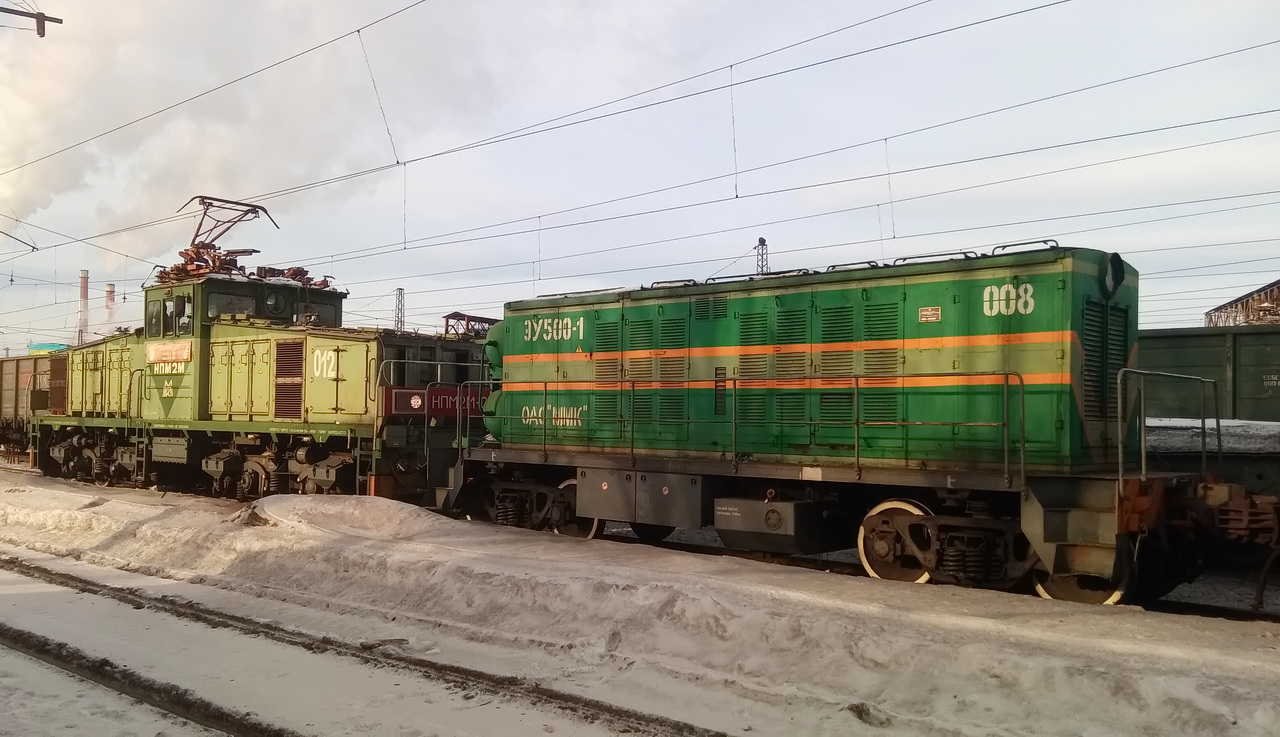
NPM2 industrial electric locomotive with EU-500 diesel-generator trailer car at Magnitogorsk Iron and Steel Works, Russia.

In Russia, the Magnitogorsk Iron and Steel Works purchased eight EU-500 diesel generator cars with a 500 kW diesel-generator for joint operation with NPM2 industrial shunting electric locomotives, equipped with the option of remote diesel generator control for operation on non-electrified sections. These cars can also be used together with any other 1.5 kV DC electric locomotives (for example, LEW EL2) after they undergo modernization.

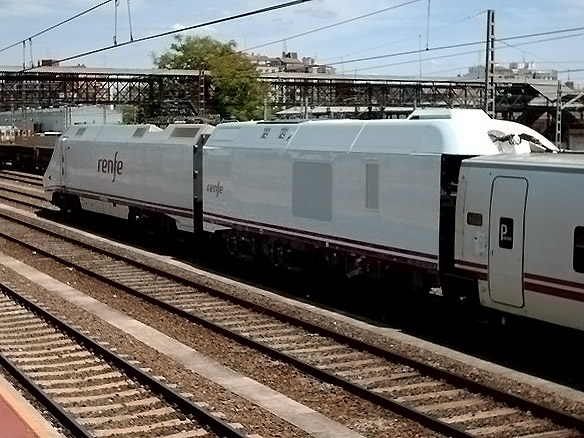
Power cars of Renfe Class 730 electro-diesel trainset, Spain. On the left is an electric locomotive, on the right is a diesel generator trailer car.

A similar concept has found application in push-pull trains:

- In Spain, Talgo converted 15 Renfe Class 130 high-speed power-centralized electric multiple units with locomotive-like power cars into Class 730 dual-mode electro-diesel multiple units in 2012 by replacing the end semi-articulated passenger carriages with non-passenger diesel generator cars and retrofitting the head cars with necessary buttons and control cables. The train has power output of 2,400 kW (3,200 hp) per power car in electric mode and 1,800 kW (2,400 hp) per power car in diesel mode, and can reach speeds of 250 km/h in electric and 190 km/h in diesel mode.
- In the United States, Amtrak plans to operate Airo push-pull passenger trainsets produced by Siemens, but with a diesel locomotive and an end electric passenger and power trailer which will draw electric power from the overhead lines or from its own batteries. Each train will consist of one Siemens Charger ALC-42E diesel-electric locomotive and Siemens Venture passenger cars, including an end car with a pantograph, transformer, rectifier and other electrical power equipment, several conventional trailer cars and one control car with a cabin similar to the locomotive. The ALC-42E is a special modification of the conventional ALC-42 diesel-electric locomotive with additional electric power equipment controls and the ability to draw power from the trailer power car via cables, but unlike the SC-42DM locomotive, it does not have its own current collectors and voltage conversion equipment when powered from overhead lines or batteries. The first trains are planned to be released in 2025 and put into operation in 2026
- In Russia, RGT-2.0 (РШП-2.0) rail grinding push-pull trainet of a similar formation has also been designed by Sinara Group. The train will consist of a specially modified single unit of the two-unit 2TE35A diesel-electric freight locomotive, a transformer car with a pantograph for power supply from overhead lines, three rail grinding cars that will contain a warehouse, a workshop and an operator's station inside, and a control passenger car for the train crew with a cabin similar to the 2TE35A diesel locomotive. The first trains are planned to be released in 2026.

== See also ==
- Biodiesel
- Dual-mode bus – the bus equivalent
- GE "Three-Power" boxcab
- Hitachi Super Express, a future train for the United Kingdom
- Electro-diesel multiple unit
