= ALCO boxcab =

Diesel-electric switcher locomotives

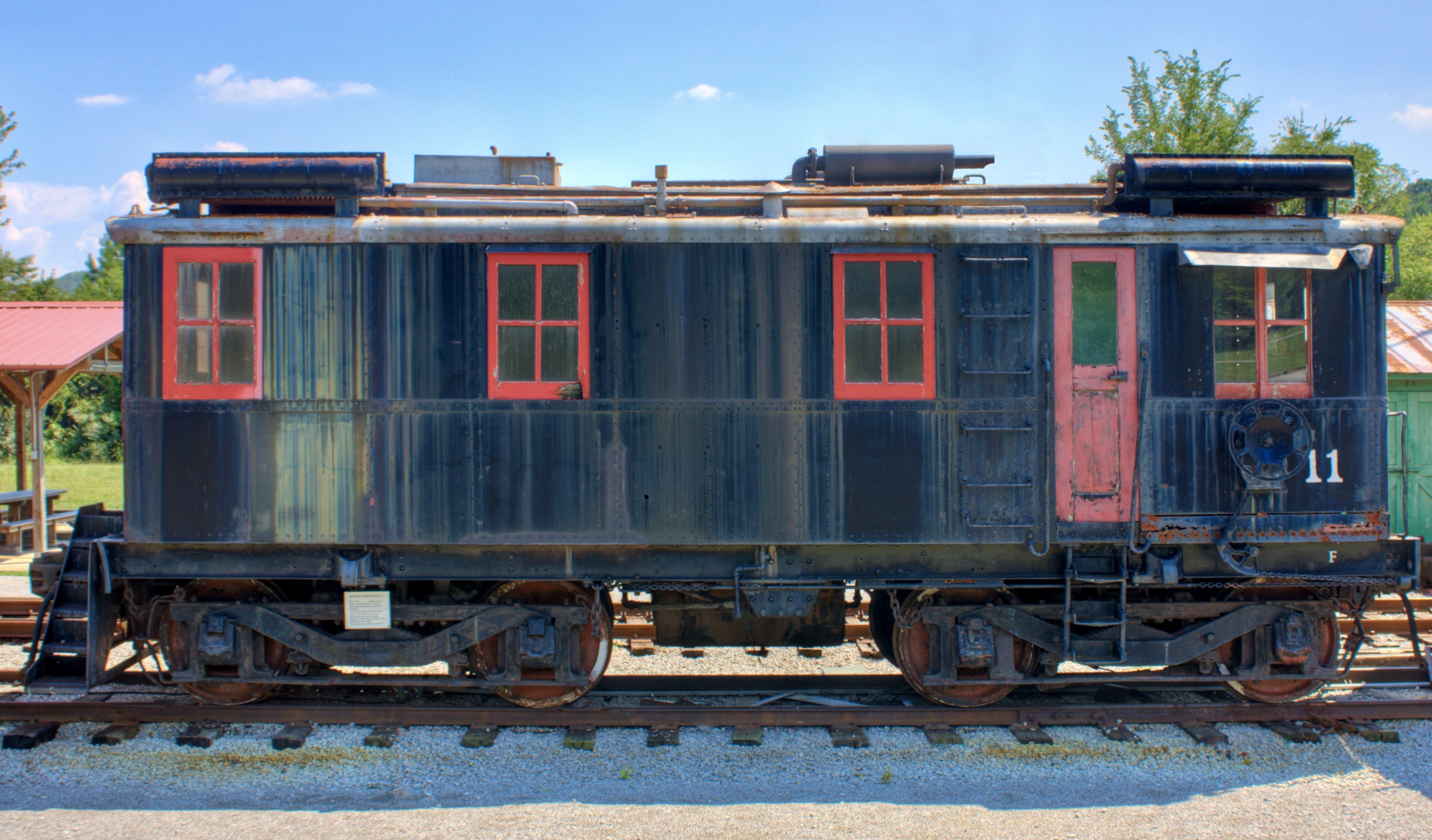
A preserved boxcab at the North Alabama Railroad Museum.

The ALCO boxcabs were diesel-electric switcher locomotives, otherwise known as AGEIR boxcabs as a contraction of the names of the builders. Produced by a partnership of three companies, ALCO (American Locomotive Company) built the chassis and running gear, General Electric the generator, motors and controls, and Ingersoll Rand the diesel engine. The principle of operation was the same as modern locomotives, the diesel engine driving a main generator of 600 volts DC with four traction motors, one per axle.

There were three models, the 60-Ton with a six-cylinder four-stroke in-line engine of 300 hp (220 kW) of which twenty were produced, a 66-Ton of which six were produced, and the 100-Ton with two of the same engines of which seven were produced. A total of 33 units were produced between 1925 and 1928.

ALCO dropped out of the arrangement in 1928, acquired their own diesel engine manufacturer in McIntosh & Seymour and went on to start its own line of diesel switchers. The first ALCO boxcab switcher was outshopped in January 1931 and after a brief demonstration tour was sold to Jay Street Connecting. The ALCO Boxcab and two end cab switchers built in early 1931 used the McIntosh & Seymour 330 engine. This early development of end cab switchers led ALCO to build the HH series based on the McIntosh & Seymour 531 engine and using GE electrical components by mid-1931.

The five surviving examples of these earliest boxcabs can be found at the B&O Railroad Museum in Baltimore, MD (CNJ #1000 - the first), the National Museum of Transportation, St. Louis, MO (B&O #1/195/8000), the North Alabama Railroad Museum in Huntsville, Alabama (Union Carbide #3/11), the Illinois Railway Museum in Union, IL (DL&W #3001/IR #91), and the Henry Ford Museum in Dearborn, MI (IR #90).

The earliest boxcabs were often termed "oil-electrics" to avoid the use of the German name "Diesel", unpopular after World War I.

== See also ==
- GE boxcab, the continuation of this locomotive design after ALCO participation ceased.
