= North Alabama Railroad Museum =

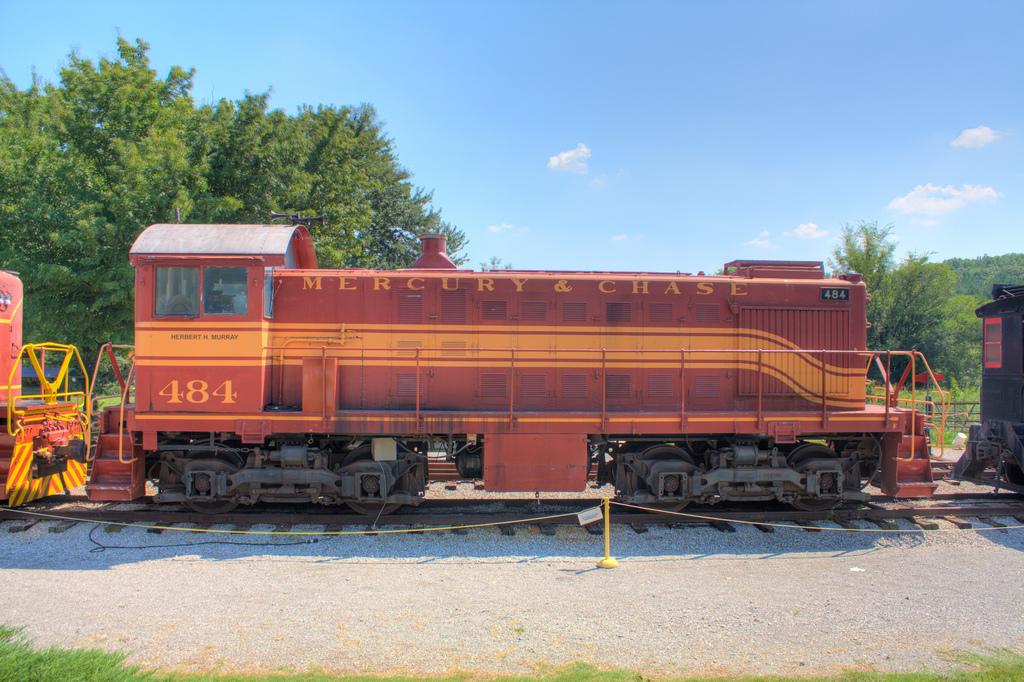
- An ALCO S-2 at the museum.
- Established: 1966
- Location: Huntsville, Alabama
- Coordinates: 34.7832°N 86.5461°W
- Type: Tourist railroad and museum
- Website: Official website

The North Alabama Railroad Museum, Inc., (reporting mark NARM) is a railroad museum in Huntsville, Alabama. The museum, incorporated in 1966, is an all volunteer organization. The museum has a collection of rolling stock, a small train station, and a small heritage railroad called the Mercury and Chase Railroad which operates between April and December. The mission of the NARM is to "preserve railroad history in North Alabama and South Central Tennessee." It is run entirely by its 100-plus volunteers. The museum is open to the public daily, volunteers are usually available on Wednesdays and Saturdays. Admission to the museum is free, however there is a charge for riding the trains. A schedule of rides is available at the museum's website.

== Overview ==
The North Alabama Railroad Museum (NARM) operates a tourist railroad in Chase, Alabama, a community near Huntsville, Alabama. In 1984, as CSX Transportation was retiring the former Nashville, Chattanooga and St. Louis Railway line between Huntsville and Winchester, Tennessee, the North Alabama Railroad Museum acquired 5 miles of the right of way. Today, the museum operates the Mercury and Chase Railroad on this right of way.

=== Railroad excursions ===
The Mercury and Chase Railroad operates regularly scheduled, public excursions and private excursions on track owned by the museum. All equipment used by the Mercury and Chase Railroad is owned and maintained by the museum. Equipment used on the excursions was all built prior to 1950. The Mercury and Chase Railroad offers trips of about 10 miles round trip from Normal east to Mt Carmel.

=== Membership ===
The NARM is an all volunteer organization. Membership is opened to anyone. Members are eligible to volunteer to work at the museum and on the excursions.

== Facilities ==
The NARM maintains several facilities. There are two depots at the Chase location, and office building which includes the history center and the library. At Mercury, there is the train maintenance shed. There is also 5 miles of right of way that is used to operate the trains.

=== Chase Depot ===
The depot at Chase, was the smallest union station in the United States. It originally served the Southern Railway and the Nashville, Chattanooga and St. Louis Railway. The primary customer of the Chase Depot was the Chase Nursery which used both railroads to ship plants throughout the country. The building currently at Chase was built in 1937, and serves as the depot for the Mercury and Chase Railroad today. Tickets for your train ride can be picked up at the ticket window of the Chase Depot.

=== Plevna Depot ===
The Plevna Depot was a whistle stop depot located in Plevna, Alabama, originally. The depot is displayed at the side of our loading platform. It is a small wooden structure that was used by passengers as a waiting area while waiting to flag the train down.

=== Chase Office building ===
The Chase Office building originally was the office for the Chase Nursery. It now houses the library and the Hugh Dudley Railroad History Center.

=== Train shed ===
The Mercury train shed is used for restoration and maintenance of railroad equipment. It can be seen while on excursions on the Mercury and Chase Railroad.

== Railroad equipment ==
The NARM and Mercury and Chase Railroad own a collection of locomotives and rolling stock that is representative of the history of railroading in north Alabama and south-central Tennessee. The locomotives are first generation diesel-electric locomotives. Rolling stock represents passenger cars as well as freight cars. Most of the equipment is at the Chase location and is available for viewing during daylight hours.

=== Locomotives ===
The Mercury and Chase Railroad owns and operates a number of Alco locomotives. There are three ALCO S-2 and S-4 units, and an ALCO RSD-1 that serve the railroad with their passenger excursion trains. The RSD-1 was built for the US Army and was used during the closing months of World War II. Many of the sister units to this locomotive were shipped to the Soviet Union under the Lend-Lease program to be used on the Trans-Iranian Railway. The S-4 was built for the Atchison, Topeka and Santa Fe Railway and had the number 1534 with that railroad.

=== Rolling stock ===
The Mercury and Chase Railroad has a number of operational railroad cars. There are two stainless steel coaches, built by Budd Company in 1939 and 1940, these are used on all excursion trains. There is a dining car which was originally built as a hospital car for the US Army by American Car and Foundry Company in 1943. There is a heavyweight coach built in 1927 by Pullman Company and a baggage car built in 1924 by American Car and Foundry Company.

=== Display equipment ===
The NARM also owns a number of cars that are used as static displays. Some of this is planned for restoration and some are permanent displays. The museum owns a 1926 ALCO boxcab locomotive, which was built with GE generator, motors, and controls and an Ingersol-Rand diesel engine. The museum owns a Railway post office car that was built for the Cincinnati, New Orleans and Texas Pacific Railway in 1928. There is a Caboose on display the museum's entrance that was built for the Southern Railway in 1947, which is opened when volunteers are present. The caboose is set up as it would have been used as the working and living quarters for railroad workers in times past.

The NARM owns many other railroad cars, including baggage cars, passenger coaches, a dining car, box cars, flat cars, cabooses, and a tank car. Many of these are on display in their current condition. Feel free to bring a camera and enjoy your time walking down the line of cars.

== The Hugh Dudley Railroad History Center ==
The NARM is the home of the Hugh Dudley Railroad History Center. The history center houses a select portion of the museum's artifacts on display. Mr. Dudley, a long-time member of the museum, is available on Saturday's when there is a train ride to talk about the items on display. The History Center is located in the building that was originally the office building for the Chase Nursery.

== Special programs ==
The NARM offers special programs throughout the year. Information concerning these events are available by contacting the museum.

=== The School Program ===
The NARM offers a field trip program each spring for kindergarten and first grade classes. This program includes a guided tour of the museum, a video presentation concerning railroading, a train ride and a ride in our railroad surrey pulled by a vintage motor car. In excess of 100,000 teachers and students have participated in The School Program since 1971. For information concerning this program, please contact the museum by phone.

=== Boy Scout Railroading Merit Badge ===
The NARM offers a Saturday session in which young men associated with Boy Scouts of America can begin the work on their Railroading Merit Badge. Much of the work can be completed during this session. The NARM has offered this program for many years and has aided many young men in receiving their merit badge.

=== Eagle Scout Projects ===
The NARM has worked with scouts on Eagle Scout (Boy Scouts of America) projects. Scouts have helped in restoration of equipment, landscaping, and building a handicapped accessible loading platform.

== See also ==
- List of heritage railroads in the United States
- List of museums in Alabama
- List of transport museums
- List of railway museums
- List of Alabama railroads
