= Cummeragh River Bog =

Nature reserve in County Kerry, Ireland

- Interactive map of Cummeragh River Bog
- Location: County Kerry, Ireland
- Coordinates: 51°52′16″N 10°03′54″W
- Area: 112.5 acres (0.455 km^{2})
- Governing body: National Parks and Wildlife Service

Cummeragh River Bog is a national nature reserve of approximately 112.5 acres (0.455 km^{2}) in County Kerry.

== Features ==
Cummeragh River Bog was legally protected as a national nature reserve by the Irish government in 1994. The Bog was initially purchased by the Dutch Foundation for the Conservation of Irish Bogs in the 1990s with the Irish Peatland Conservation Council, along with Scragh Bog and Clochar na gCon. These three bogs were then later handed over to be managed by the Irish state.

The Bog is the most southerly intact Irish lowland blanket bog, and is deemed to be of international importance. The area is completely surrounded by the Cummeragh River and its tributary. The bog itself is in very good condition and is growing. It contains a network of hummocks and pools with a thick, established cover of vegetation. Among the fauna found on the reserve are curlews and the black slug as well as the rivers containing spawning areas for sea trout.
