= Clochar na gCon =

Blanket bog in County Galway, Ireland

- Interactive map of Clochar na gCon
- Location: County Galway, Ireland
- Coordinates: 53°17′06″N 9°24′43″W
- Area: 3,081 acres (12.47 km^{2})
- Governing body: National Parks and Wildlife Service

Clochar na gCon is an intact Atlantic or oceanic blanket bog and national nature reserve of approximately 3,081 acres (12.47 km^{2}) in County Galway, Ireland. It is 25 km west of Galway city.

== Features ==
Clochar na gCon, officially known as Clochar na gCon/Bealacooan Bog Nature Reserve, was legally protected as a national nature reserve by the Irish government in 1999. Along with Scragh Bog in County Westmeath, Cummeragh River Bog in County Kerry, parts of Clochar na gCon had been bought by the Dutch peatland conservationist, Matthijs Schouten, before being handed over to the Irish state. Before its designation as a nature reserve, the Irish Peatland Conservation Council led a campaign to save the bog from turf cutting.

Clochar na gCon bog is an intact example of an Atlantic or oceanic blanket bog which is part of the larger Connemara Bog Complex. The bog has a wide variety of rare flora, and hosts a number of important or threatened European fauna endemic to blanket bogs. Actively growing bog is a priority EU habitat. In 1998 the insect species, Psallus confusus, was recorded at Clochar na gCon as a new species in Ireland along with the first record since 1898 of Salda morio. During the same survey, one of Ireland's rarest birds, the merlin, was found to be breeding at the site.
