= IÉ 201 Class =

Railway locomotive

Iarnród Éireann / Northern Ireland Railways 201 Class
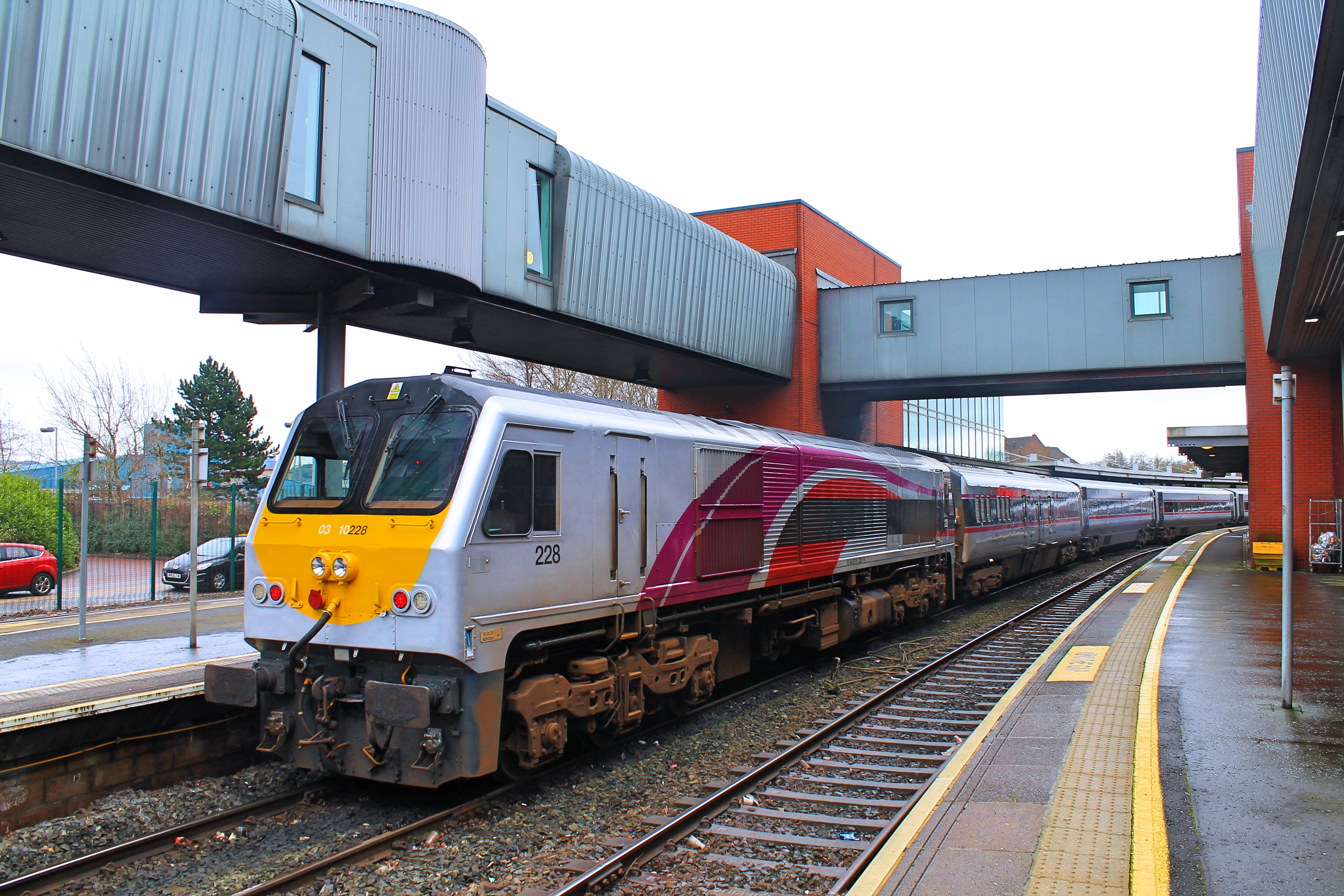
- 201 Class 228 at Lanyon Place (Formerly Belfast Central) in current Enterprise livery in 2016
Type and origin
- Power type: Diesel–electric
- Builder: General Motors Diesel, London, Ontario, Canada
- Model: JT42HCW
- Build date: 1994–1995
- Total produced: 34
Specifications
- Configuration
  - AAR: C-C
  - UIC: Co′Co′
- Gauge: 1,600 mm (5 ft 3 in)
- Trucks: GC bogies
- Wheel diameter: 1,016 mm (40 in)
- Length: 20.955 m (68 ft 9 in)
- Width: 2.64 m (8 ft 8 in)
- Height: 4.02 m (13 ft 2 1/4 in)
- Loco weight: 109 tonnes (107.3 long tons; 120.2 short tons)
- Fuel capacity: 4,500 litres (990 imp gal; 1,200 US gal)
- Prime mover: EMD 12-710G3B
- Engine type: V12 diesel
- Aspiration: Turbocharged
- Traction motors: Six axle-hung, nose-suspended D43 traction motors
- Cylinders: 12
- MU working: All IÉ and NIR GM-EMD locomotives
- Train heating: HEP: Dayton-Phoenix alternator, model E7145, 438 kVA, 220/380VAC, 3-phase, 50 Hz
- Loco brake: Air & vacuum, 27LAV; Blended Brakes, not used
Performance figures
- Maximum speed: 100 mph (160 km/h)
- Power output: 3,200 hp (2,400 kW) gross; 2,970 hp (2,210 kW) traction
Career
- Operators: Iarnród Éireann; Northern Ireland Railways
- Number in class: 32 Irish Rail and 2 Northern Ireland Railways
- Numbers: 201–234

The Iarnród Éireann (IÉ) / Northern Ireland Railways 201 Class locomotives are the newest and most powerful diesel locomotives operating in Ireland and were built between 1994 and 1995 by General Motors Diesel. They are model type JT42HCW, fitted with an EMD 12-710G3B engine of 3,200 hp (2,400 kW), weigh 109 tonnes (107.3 long tons; 120.2 short tons) and have a maximum speed of 100 mph (160 km/h).

== History ==
By the early 1990s, the locomotives operating passenger services in Ireland were becoming increasingly obsolete, with the newest type in service being the 071 Class introduced in 1976. The economic boom in Ireland in the mid-1990s allowed Iarnród Éireann to begin significant investment in the infrastructure of the railways, which began with an order for 32 brand new express locomotives from GM-EMD. Northern Ireland Railways also purchased two. The first were delivered in 1994, with deliveries continuing until 1995.

To allow clearance tests and driver training to commence in advance of the delivery of the main order of 201s, it was decided to transport the first locomotive, number 201, to Dublin by air. An Antonov An-124 was used to transport the locomotive from London, Ontario to Dublin Airport, arriving on Thursday 9 June 1994. The first light-engine test run operated from Inchicore works to Kildare on the Tuesday 14.

Unfortunately, the locomotives have had a chequered service history. The authors of Jane's Train Recognition Guide noted that IÉ had had problems with engine fires and bogie cracks. It is led to believe they became expensive to maintain, but have remained in service. Numerous members of the class have been put into storage.

== Technical details ==
- Main Generator Assembly: AR8PHEH/CA6
- Head End Alternator (HEP): Dayton-Phoenix, model E7145, 438 kVA, 220/380VAC, 3-phase, 50 Hz
- Standby HEP: 220 kVA from AR8, available only when stationary
- Auxiliary Generator: 5A-8147, 18 kW (24 hp)
- Air Compressor/Exhauster: Gardner Denver, model WLPA9B
- Multiple Working: All IÉ & NIR EMD locos
- Push Pull Working: Locos 206-209 & 215–234
- Curve Negotiation Capability:
  - Yard: 80 m (262 ft)
  - Running line: 115 m (377 ft)
  - Coupled to train: 141 m (463 ft)

=== Equipment new to IÉ locos ===
- Air Dryer
- Teloc 2200 Event Recorder
- Electrically heated windscreens
- Active noise control in both cabs
- Enclosed body style, last seen on 1950s Metro-Vic A and C Classes
- Head End Power (HEP)
  - This system supplied AC power to the train for heating, battery charging, etc. and was intended to replace the Mark 2 & Mark 3 Generator Vans used at the time. In the event HEP was only used on the Enterprise cross-border De Dietrich service. HEP is no longer used due to noise while the train is in station, and reliability issues running the prime mover at high speed constantly. Four Mark 3 generator vans remain in use on the Enterprise service. The later CAF-built Mark 4 sets include their own generators in the Driving Van Trailer (DVT).
- EM2000 digital traction computer
- Train (carriage) door control
- D43 Traction Motors
- Super Series wheel creep control
- Cab mounted electronic fuel gauges
- Fire suppression system, FM200 extinguisher

=== Variants ===
There are three versions within the Class 201:

- 201 to 205 & 210 to 214
  - Fixed buffers, shackle coupling
- 215, 217 to 226, 229, 232 and 234
  - Retractable buffers, automatic or shackle coupling,
  - Push-pull capability, electronic fuel gauges
- 206 to 209, 216, 227, 228, 230, 231 & 233
  - Retractable buffers, automatic or shackle coupling,
  - Push-pull capability, electronic fuel gauges
  - NIR train radio and TPWS/AWS for cross-border service.
  - HaslerRail 2500 Event recorder

== Fleet ==
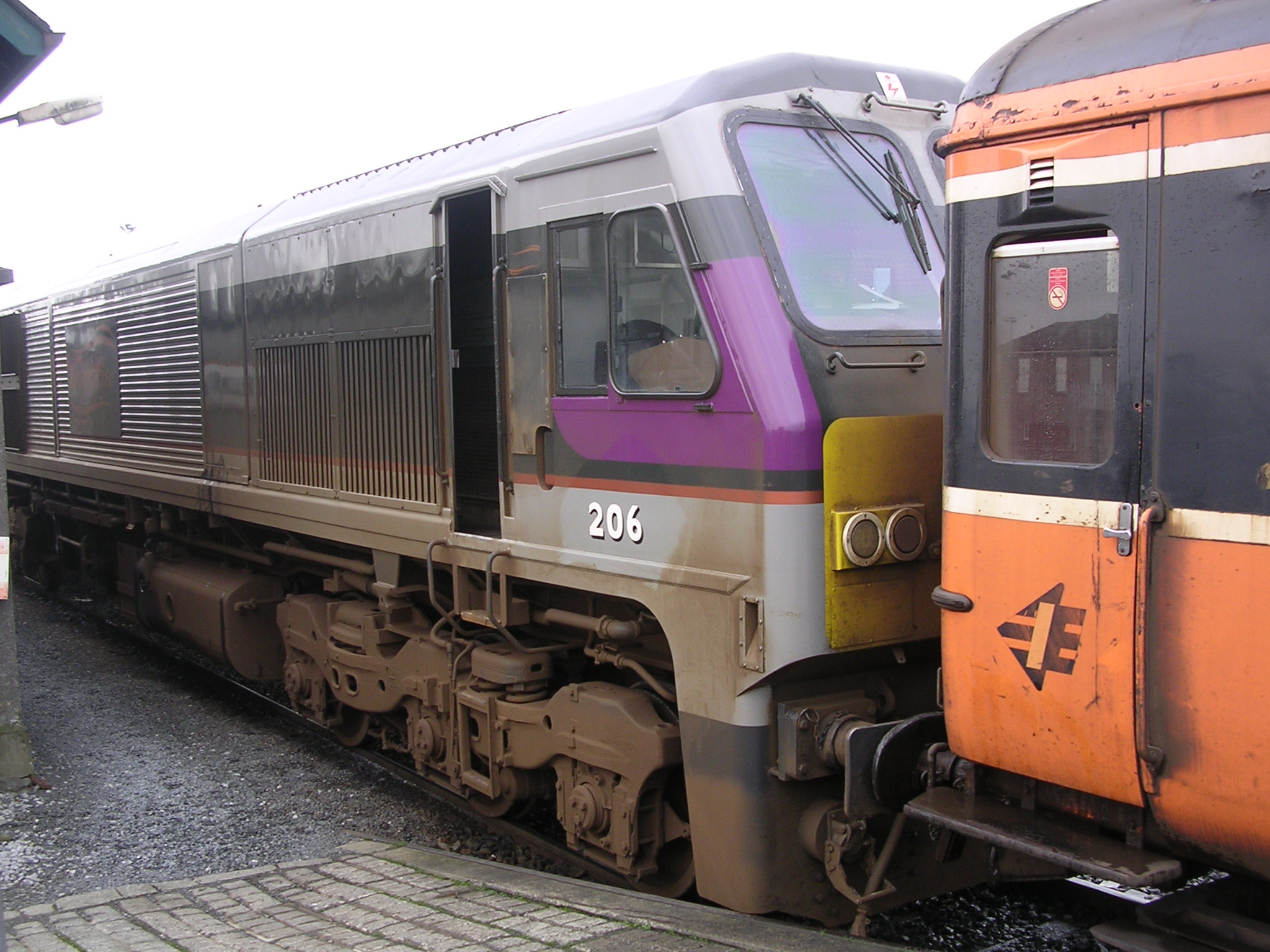
No. 206 (Abhainn na Life/River Liffey), in the original Enterprise livery, at Limerick Colbert station in 2006

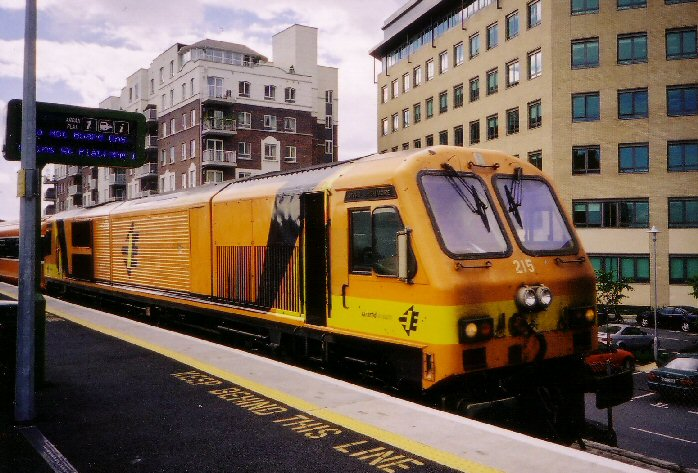
No. 215 (An Abhainn Mhór/River Avonmore) at Grand Canal Dock station in 2001

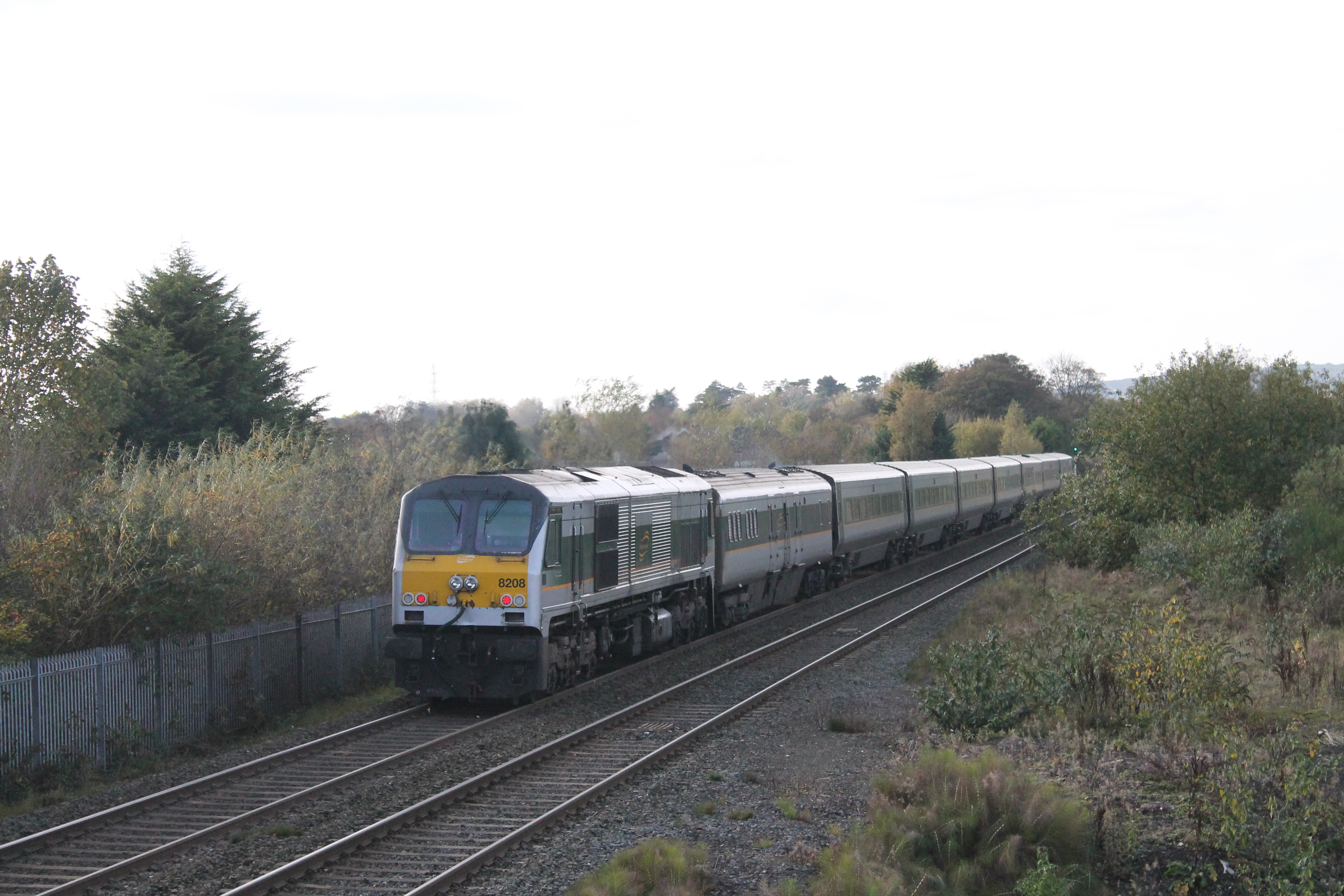
NIR-owned no. 8208 (River Lagan; originally numbered 208), in the second Enterprise livery, passing through Musgrave in 2014. 8208 was the only locomotive in the class to receive this livery.

Class	Push-pull capable?	Number built	Fleet numbers	Operations		Notes
Class	Push-pull capable?	Number built	Fleet numbers	Primary	Other	Notes
201	No	10	201–205, 210–214	Freight		In long-term storage. Being used as spares sources.
201	Yes	14	215, 217–226, 229, 232, 234	InterCity	Freight	224 stored in Inchicore.
201	Yes	10	206–209, 216, 227, 228, 230, 231, 233	Enterprise	InterCity, Freight	208/209 owned by NIR (renumbered 8208/8209). 230 in storage. All fitted with TPWS and AWS.

=== InterCity ===
Today push-pull equipped members of the 201 class operate the only passenger locomotive hauled services in the Republic of Ireland between Dublin and Cork. They operate with Mark 4 carriages which were introduced to the route in 2006/2007. The current livery, which primarily consists of green and silver, was introduced in 2006. All locomotives have full yellow ends to enhance visibility.

Non push-pull locomotives were withdrawn from service because Mark 4 carriages operate a push-pull system and rolling stock on other InterCity routes was replaced by 22000 Class DMUs. The only other locomotive-hauled service (also push-pull) is the Enterprise cross-border service to Belfast which is detailed below.

=== Enterprise ===
The Enterprise is a cross-border passenger service between Dublin and Belfast operated by Iarnród Éireann and Northern Ireland Railways. This is also a locomotive-hauled service and operates a similar push-pull system like services to Cork. As this is a jointly operated service, it is marketed as the "Enterprise" and the coaching stock and locomotives carry a separate livery to either operator's own services. It consists of light grey with a purple and red strip. Locomotives also have full yellow ends to enhance visibility.

As the service is shared, locomotives (8)208 and (8)209 are owned by Northern Ireland Railways. The coaching stock is owned by operators, Iarnród Éireann own the odd numbered coaches and NIR own the even numbered coaches.

In addition, Iarnród Éireann introduced four former Mark 3 generator vans, in September 2012, to operate this route, in a bid to improve reliability of the service and reduce maintenance costs. Previously, the service operated with head end power and this caused regular locomotive failures, increased wear and tear and also contributed to locomotive 230 being removed from service in June 2013 after an engine fire, while operating a passenger service with HEP in operation.

=== Freight ===
201 Class locomotives also operate some freight services as required. There is a container flow between Dublin Port and Ballina.

Since 2016, some 201 Class locomotives have operated increased freight services, as the weight and length of some freight services was increased, due to customer demand.

=== Common livery ===
Locomotives 231 and 233 are painted in a common livery, which consists of light grey with a black stripe. The reason for this is that they are assigned for Enterprise duties and as part of the refurbishment of the Enterprise service, in 2015–2016, only six were given the full livery. Prior to this, some of those given the current livery had previously had the InterCity livery. As part of Iarnród Éireann's logo change, all InterCity 201's carry the new Iarnród Éireann logo, which includes the Irish flag, and for operational and safety reasons they do not operate cross border services, so a common colour scheme was adopted. After the cancellation of the Belmond Grand Hibernian in Ireland, locomotive 216 has been used on both Enterprise and InterCity services, it remains in the blue livery of the Belmond Grand Hibernian as of September 2026.

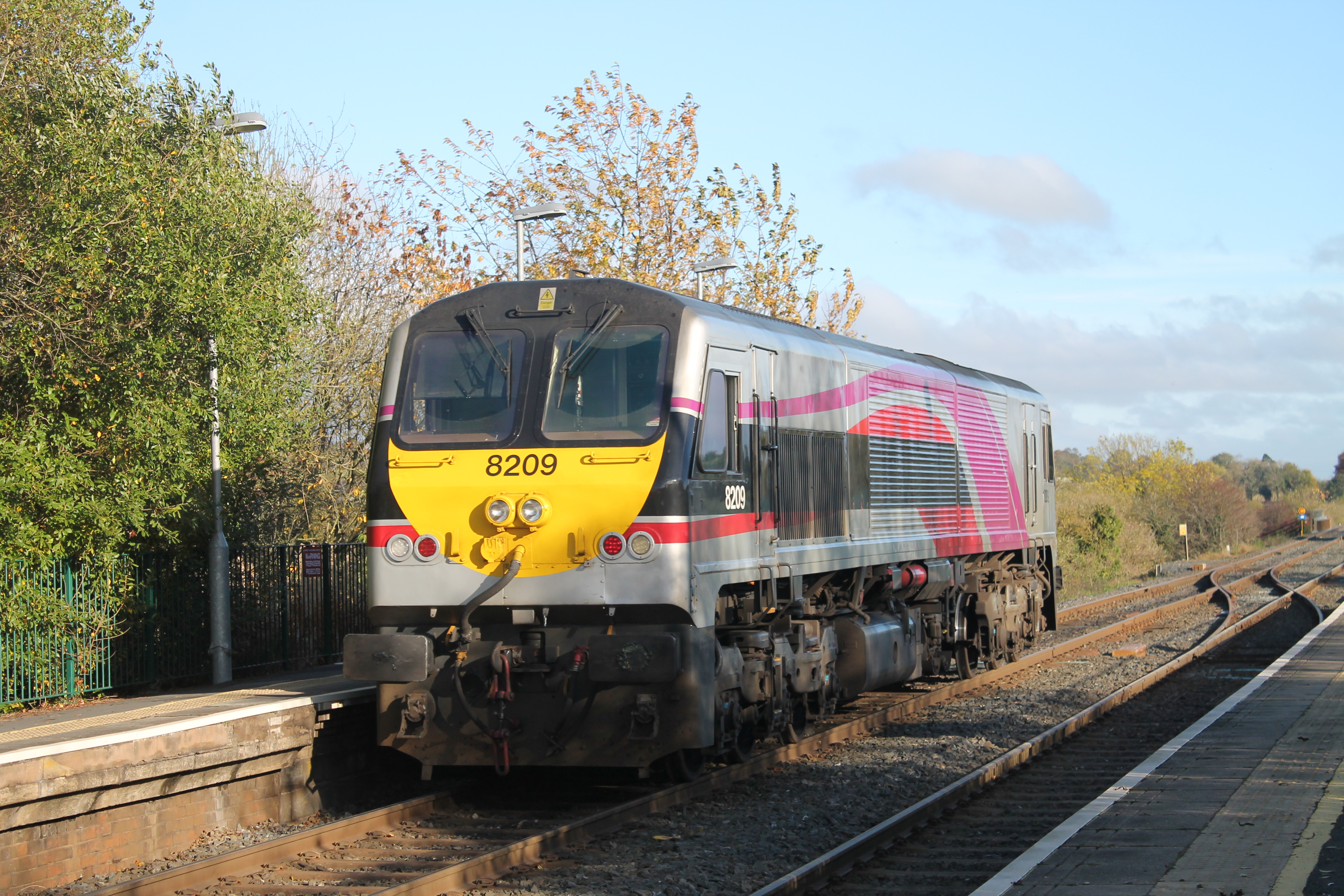
NIR-owned no. 8209 (River Foyle; originally numbered 209), in the current Enterprise livery, at Moira in 2015

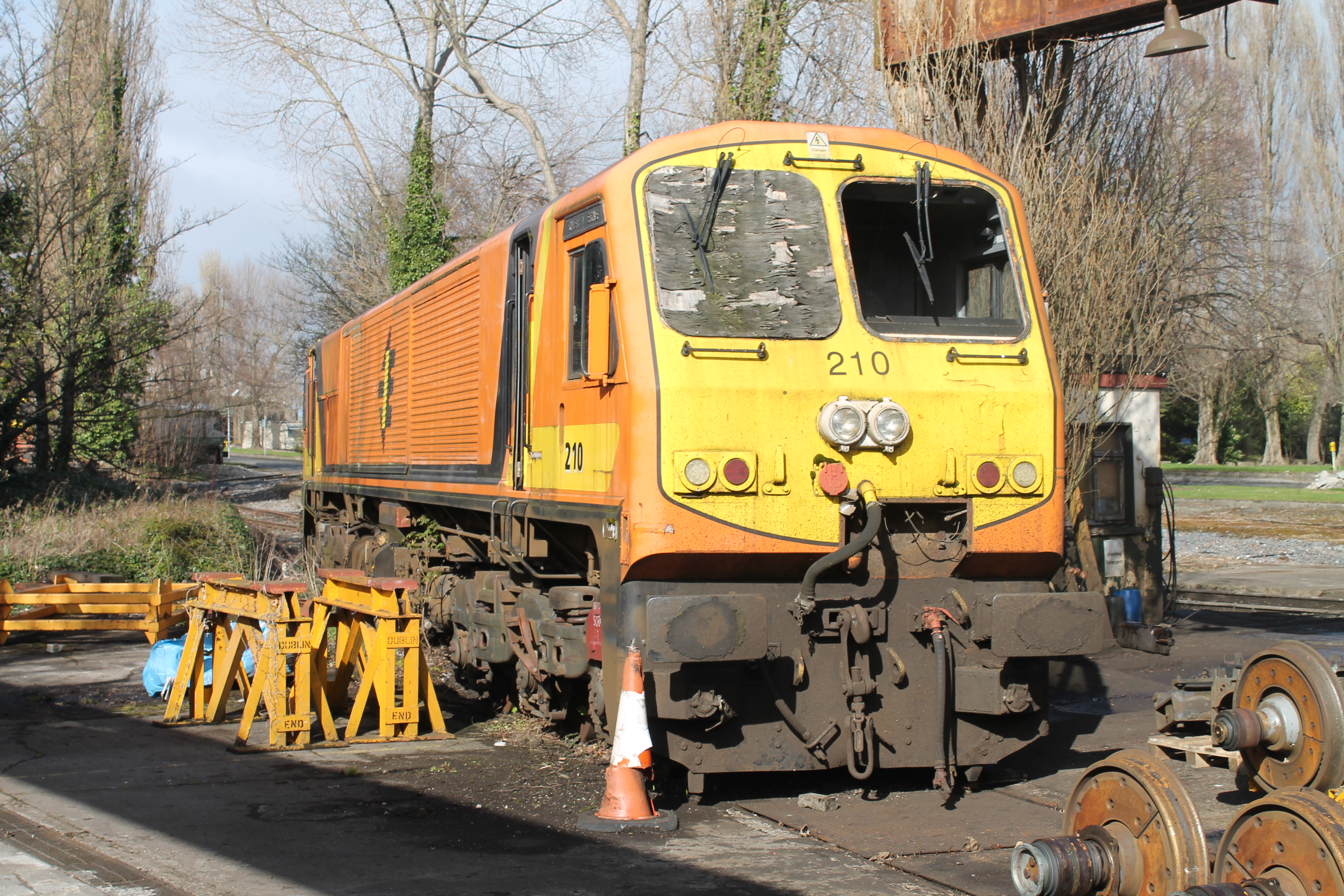
No. 210 (Abhainn na hÉirne/River Erne) in storage at Inchicore Works in 2016

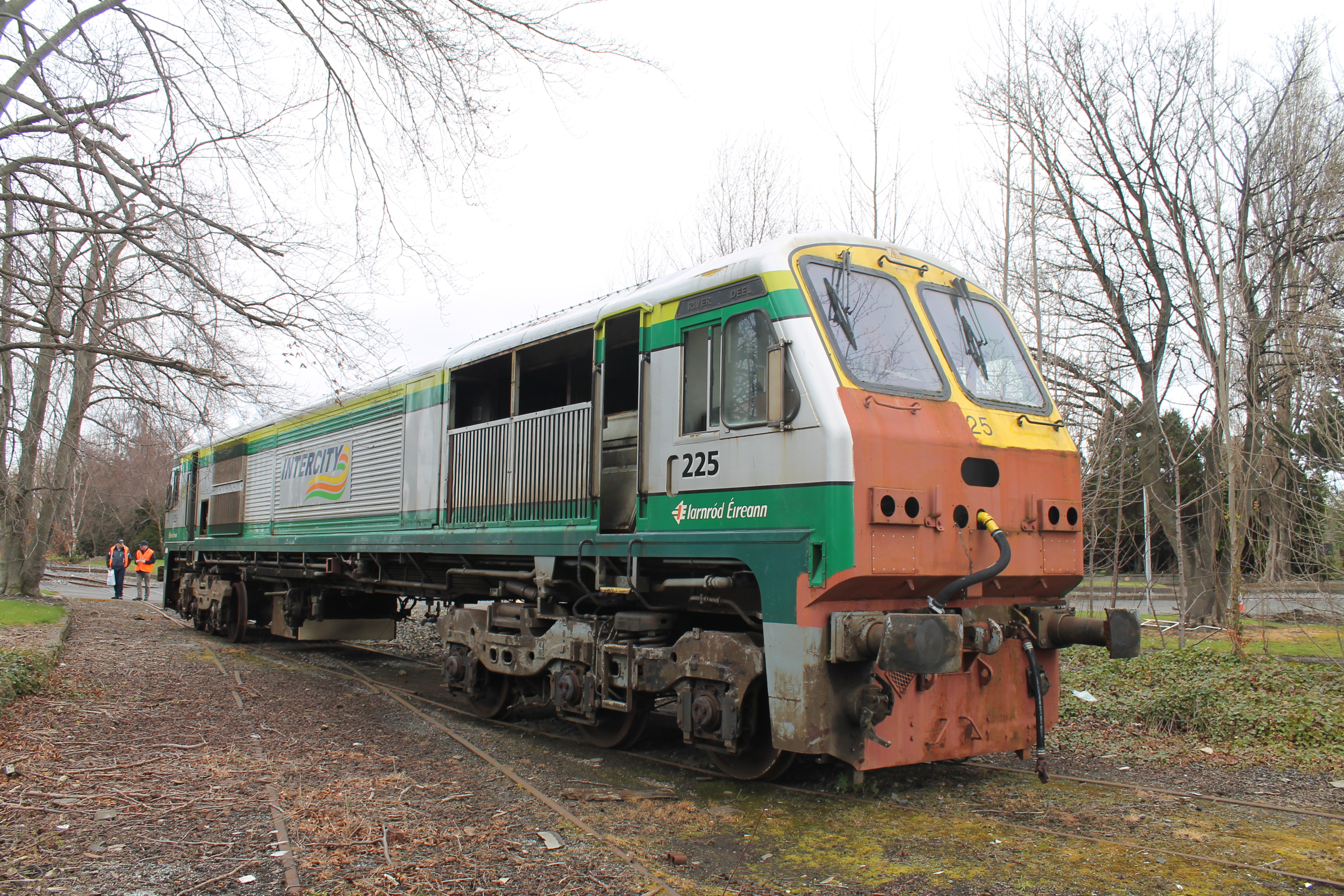
Accident-damaged No. 225 (Abhainn na Daoile/River Deel) at Inchicore Works in 2014

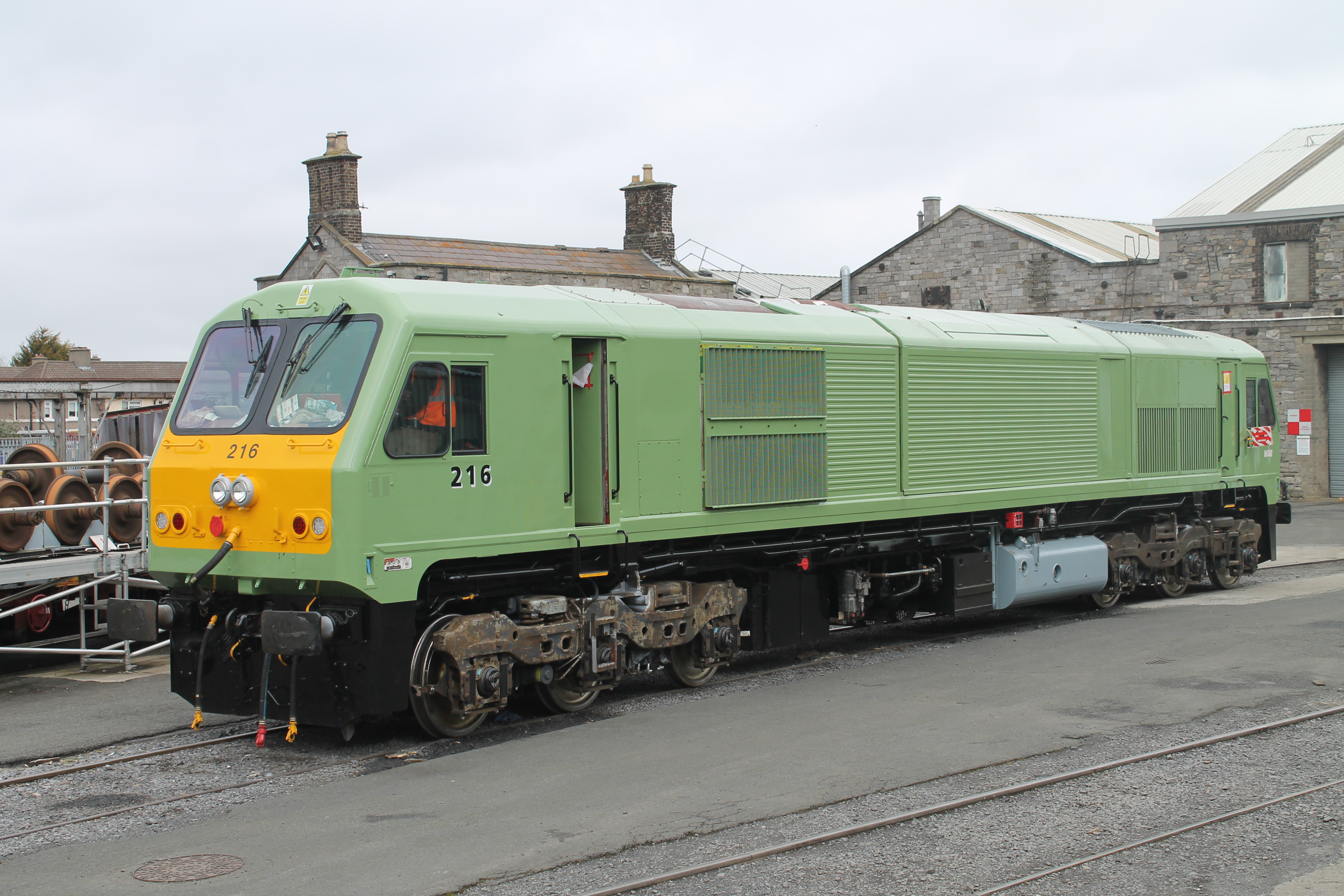
No. 216 (Abhainn na Dothra/River Dodder) stabled at Inchicore Works in 2016 awaiting repaint into Belmond Grand Hibernian livery

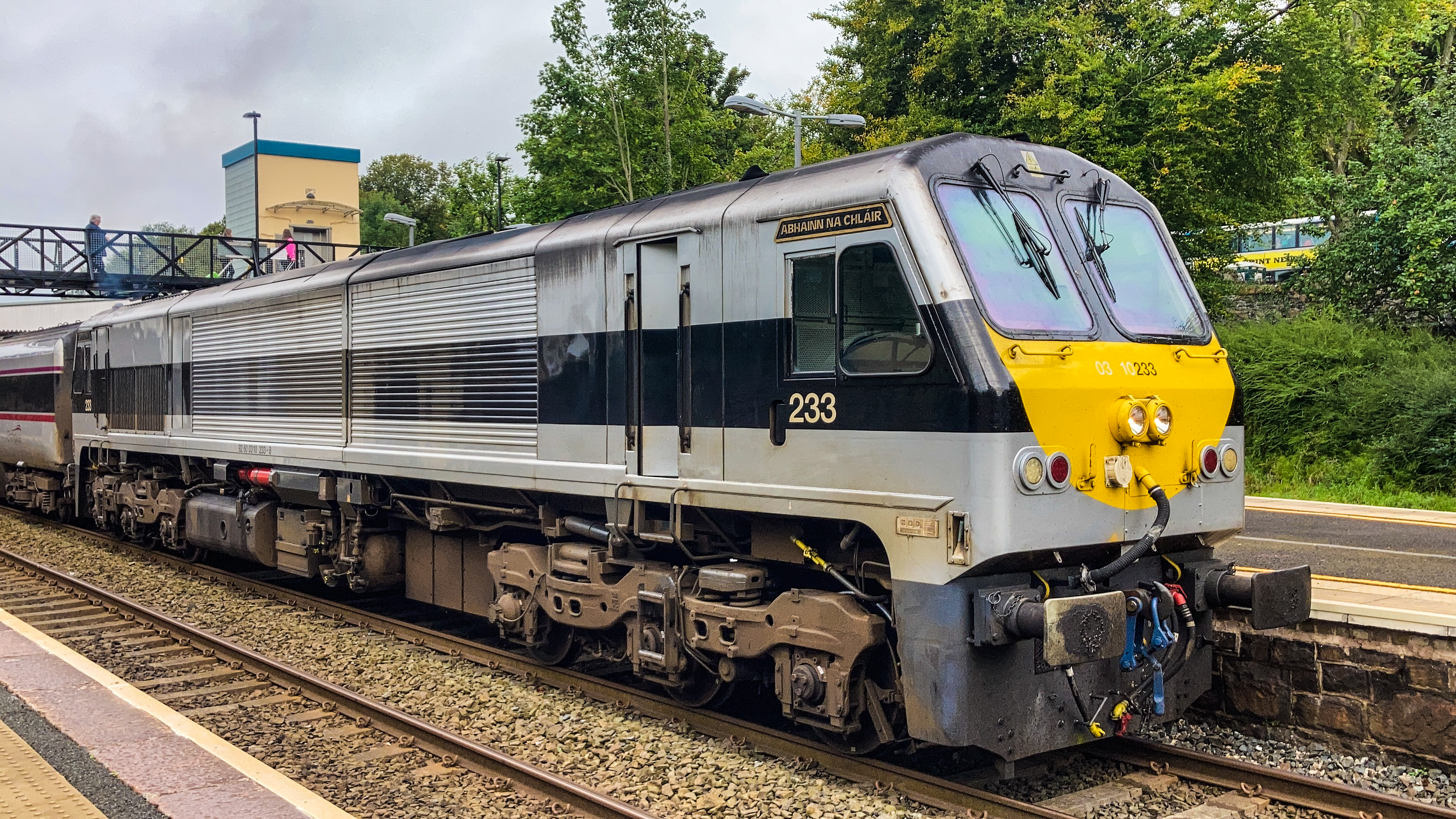
Iarnrod Éireann Class 201 locomotive No. 233 stopped at Lisburn railway station whilst operating a Dublin-Belfast Enterprise service. This has the 'common livery'.

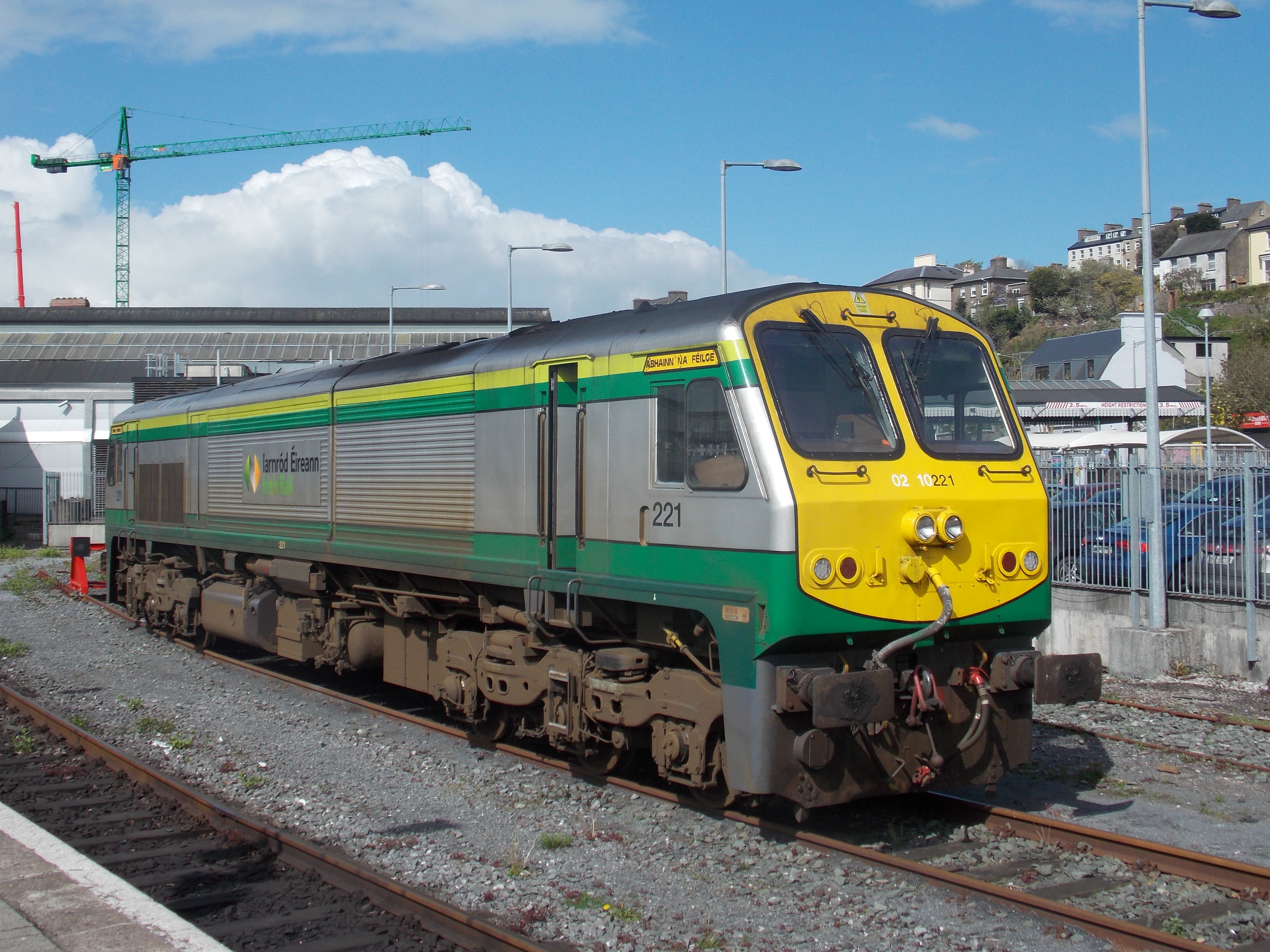
No. 221 resting at Cork Kent Station in April 2019

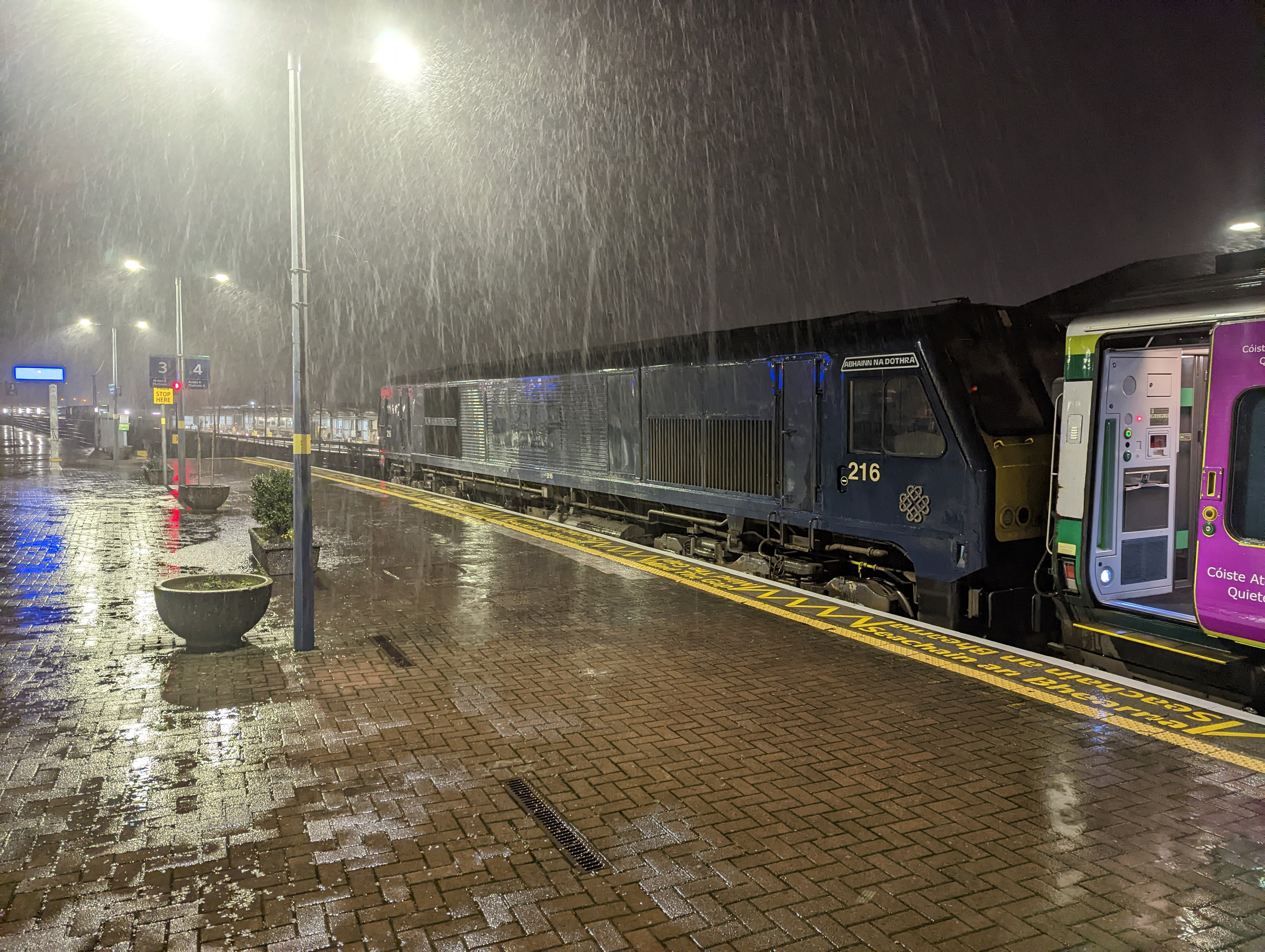
No. 216 (Abhainn na Dothra/River Dodder) back in service with Irish Rail, in the Belmond Grand Hibernian livery, at Cork Kent station in 2022

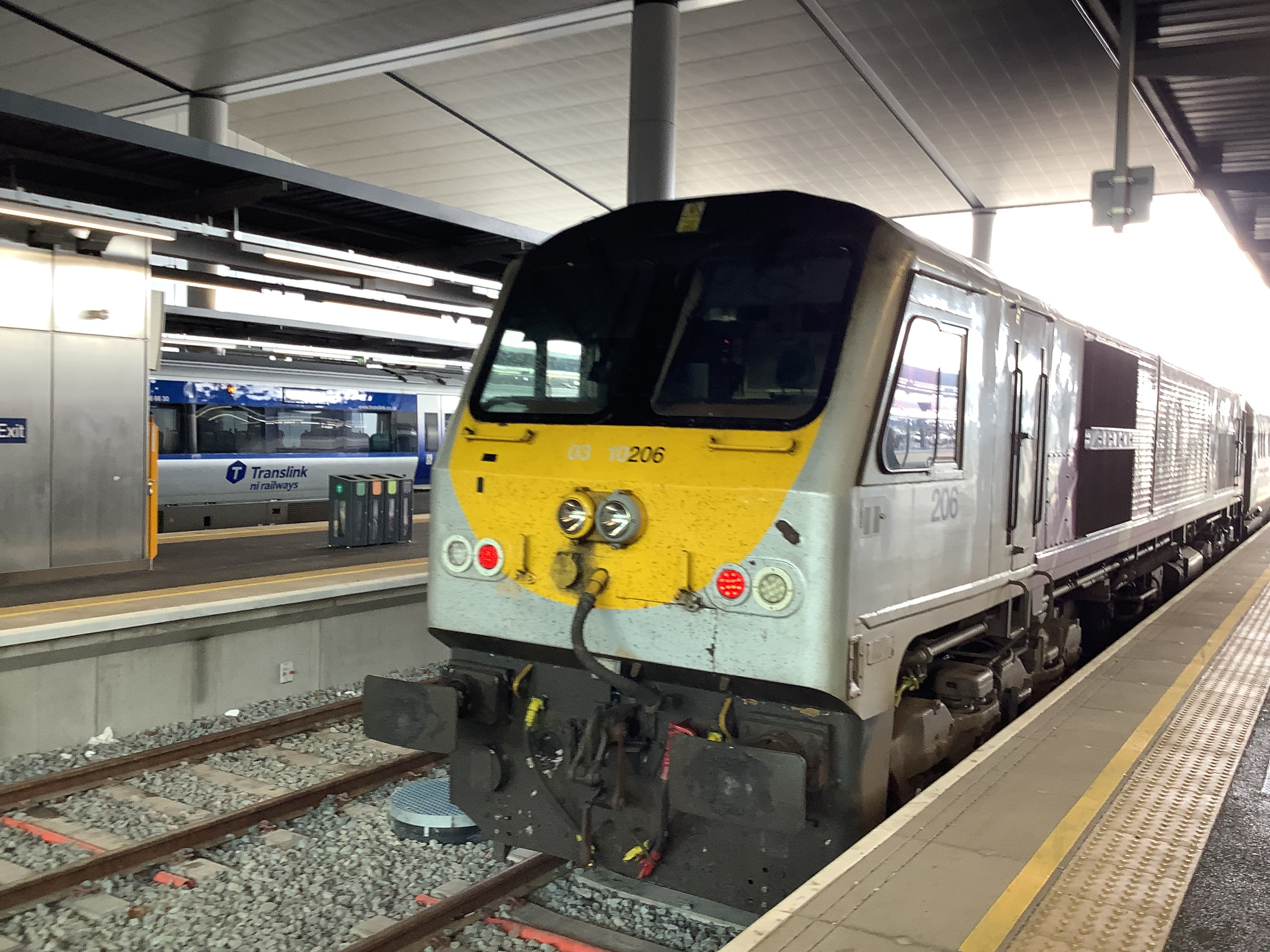

=== List of locomotives and names ===
The entire class is named after Irish rivers, with the IÉ locomotives carrying two nameplates, one in Irish and one in English, on each side of the locomotive. As 208 and 209 are owned by Northern Ireland Railways, they carry English language only nameplates. The nameplates are trapezium shaped, with the names in upper case. Some of the class have had long periods out of service, some of these are outlined below.

Key:	In service	Stored	Scrapped	Preserved

Number	Name		Livery	Status	Notes
Number	Irish	English	Livery	Status	Notes
201	Abhainn na Sionnainne	River Shannon	Old InterCity	Stored	Fixed buffers, not cleared for push-pull operation. Stored at Inchicore Works as surplus to requirements.
202	Abhainn na Laoi	River Lee	Old InterCity	Stored	Fixed buffers, not cleared for push-pull operation. Stored at Inchicore Works as surplus to requirements.
203	Abhainn na Coiribe	River Corrib	Old InterCity	Stored	Fixed buffers, not cleared for push-pull operation. Stored at Inchicore Works as surplus to requirements.
204	Abhainn na Bearú	River Barrow	Old InterCity	Stored	Fixed buffers, not cleared for push-pull operation. Stored at Inchicore Works as surplus to requirements.
205	Abhainn na Feoire	River Nore	Old InterCity	Stored	Fixed buffers, not cleared for push-pull operation. Stored at Inchicore Works as surplus to requirements.
206	Abhainn na Life	River Liffey	Enterprise	Operational	Fitted with TPWS/AWS for cross-border services.
207	Abhainn na Bóinne	River Boyne	Enterprise	Operational	Fitted with TPWS/AWS for cross-border services.
8208	-	River Lagan	Enterprise	Operational	Owned by Translink, number prefixed with '8' to accommodate their computer systems. Fitted with TPWS/AWS for cross-border services.
8209	-	River Foyle	Enterprise	Operational	Owned by Translink, number prefixed with '8' to accommodate their computer systems. Fitted with TPWS/AWS for cross-border services.
210	Abhainn na hEirne	River Erne	Old InterCity	Stored	Fixed buffers, not cleared for push-pull operation. Stored at Inchicore Works as surplus to requirements.
211	Abhainn na Suca	River Suck	Old InterCity	Stored	Fixed buffers, not cleared for push-pull operation. Stored at Inchicore Works as surplus to requirements.
212	Abhainn na Sláine	River Slaney	Old InterCity	Stored	Fixed buffers, not cleared for push-pull operation. Stored at Inchicore Works as surplus to requirements.
213	Abhainn na Muaidhe	River Moy	Old InterCity	Stored	Fixed buffers, not cleared for push-pull operation. Stored at Inchicore Works as surplus to requirements.
214	Abhainn na Brosnaí	River Brosna	Old InterCity	Stored	Fixed buffers, not cleared for push-pull operation. Stored at Inchicore Works as surplus to requirements.
215	An Abhainn Mhór	River Avonmore	InterCity (Current logo)	Operational	
216	Abhainn na Dothra	River Dodder	Belmond Grand Hibernian	Operational	Stopped in 2009 as surplus to requirements. Returned to service in 2016 for the Belmond Grand Hibernian service. Fitted with TPWS/AWS for cross-border services.
217	Abhainn na Fleisce	River Flesk	InterCity (Current logo)	Operational	
218	Abhainn na Garbhóige	River Garavogue	InterCity (Current logo)	Operational	
219	Abhainn na Tulchann	River Tolka	InterCity (Current logo)	Operational	
220	An Abhainn Dhubh	River Blackwater	Revised original	Operational	
221	Abhainn na Feilge	River Fealge	InterCity (Current logo)	Operational	
222	Abhainn na Dargaile	River Dargle	InterCity (Current logo)	Operational	
223	Abhainn na hAinnire	River Anner	InterCity (Current logo)	Operational	
224	Abhainn na Féile	River Feale	InterCity (Current logo)	Stored	Stopped 7 July 2020 due to structural failure of the underframe. The official RAIU report into the failure, issued in July 2021, concluded that a weld repair to a non-structural bed plate had been unnecessarily applied to a structural chassis plate, causing an eventual failure of the underframe. Stored at Inchicore Works.
225	Abhainn na Daoile	River Deel	InterCity (Current logo)	Operational	Stopped 2 September 2010 after a fatal level crossing collision which caused extensive underframe damage. Returned to freight service on 24 October 2019 and passenger service on 8 November 2019.
226	Abhainn na Siuire	River Suir	InterCity (Current logo)	Operational	Fitted with a plaque commemorating 150 years Thurles Railway Station 1848 - 1998. Logos of Thurles Town Council and the Great Southern and Western Railway
227	Abhainn na Leamhna	River Laune	Enterprise	Operational	Fitted with TPWS/AWS for cross-border services.
228	An Abhainn Bhuí	River Owenboy	Enterprise	Operational	Fitted with TPWS/AWS for cross-border services.
229	Abhainn na Mainge	River Maine	InterCity (Current logo)	Operational	
230	Abhainn na Bandan	River Bandon	Old Enterprise	Stored	Stopped in 2013 due to major fire damage. Stored at Inchicore Works.
231	Abhainn na Maighe	River Maigue	Common Livery	Operational	Fitted with TPWS/AWS for cross-border services.
232	Abhainn na Chaomaraigh	River Cummeragh	InterCity (Current logo)	Operational	
233	Abhainn na Chláir	River Clare	Common Livery	Operational	Fitted with TPWS/AWS for cross-border services.
234	Abhainn na hEatharlaí	River Aherlow	InterCity (Current logo)	Operational	

== Current operations ==
All of the non push-pull capable locomotives (201–205 and 210–214) were placed in storage at Inchicore during 2009, the last being 214 in July 2009. This was due to the withdrawal of the Mark 3 fleet and their replacement with 22000 Class DMUs on the vast majority of passenger services. This left only the Mark 4 Dublin–Cork services and the cross-border Enterprise service (with De Dietrich rolling stock) as the only locomotive hauled passenger services operated by Iarnród Éireann.

The reduction in the number of locomotive hauled passenger workings, combined with the withdrawal of older GM locomotives, has seen 201 Class locomotives used on freight workings, whilst four push-pull capable units were transferred to join the original four dedicated locomotives in use on the Enterprise.

In 2010 Iarnród Éireann planned to store some of its remaining push-pull capable Mark 3 coaches, which could potentially have been used with 201 Class locomotives to enhance Enterprise's service. However, most Mark 3 carriages were scrapped during 2013 and 2014. A fleet of 10 Mark 3 coaches were sold to Belmond Grand Hibernian, while 216 and 225 were earmarked be returned to service to handle the extra traffic generated by Belmond operation. In May 2016, 216 returned to service in Belmond livery, and has operated the Grand Hibernian almost exclusively since that time.

In October 2011 233 suffered bearing failure en route to Connolly station from Belfast. It was transported by road to Inchicore Railway Works

On 15 February 2016 two 201 Class locomotives (226 & 209) operated freight trials with a long train of 15 HOBS ballast wagons plus one un-powered loco, possibly assessing the loco's capabilities for future freight services.

In October 2016 Iarnród Éireann expressed an interest in seeking solutions to re-power most of the fleet during a mid-life refurbishment. The requirement was for floor-up engine and control gear solutions, which kept the existing cab controls and compatibility with the existing GM fleet and push/pull equipment. The body, cab controls, bogies, and traction motors would remain unchanged. 201 and 205 were brought in from storage for internal and external inspection, possibly in relation to this re-powering. The re-powering project was originally scheduled to begin in the first quarter of 2017, but was cancelled in early 2019.

In July 2017, 230 received some bodywork repairs after it suffered significant damage, due to a fire in the HEP system in 2013. The loco has been in storage since.

It is worth noting that they cannot operate on the Larne line due to weight clearance.

== Model ==
In the late 1990s, Model Irish Railways produced a resin bodyshell kit with nameplates, numbering, brass grills and the standard yellow / black livery line transfers. Marks Models also released a resin kit for these locomotives in 00 gauge in c.2000.

In 2001, Murphy Models commissioned LIMA to produce an '00' gauge 201 model loco. They were produced in IÉ orange (201, 216, 217, 219, 230) and Enterprise (206, 207, 208, 209) liveries, in batches of 300 (except 500 of #207).
Numbers 208 and 209 were also released in Northern Ireland Railways Blue Livery.

In 2011 Murphy Models launched a completely new version of the 201, with all wheel drive, centre can motor and preinstalled speaker. This was released in IÉ orange (original and revised), Green Intercity and NIR blue as well as NIR Enterprise original and revised.

Railtec Transfers and Studio Scale Models make transfers for the full range of 201 liveries, No's 201–234, original and updated Orange, original and updated Enterprise and Green Intercity.

The 201 Class has also been released in virtual form as a player driveable locomotive in the Microsoft Train Simulator add-on, "Irish Enterprise North", by Making Tracks, and for OpenBVE by Celtic Trainsim.
