= Fenor =

Village in County Waterford, Ireland

Fenor Fionnúir
- Village
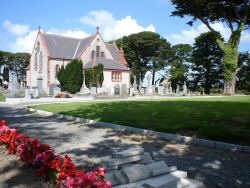
- Fenor Church

- Location in Ireland
- Coordinates: 52°09′42″N 7°13′34″W
- Country: Ireland
- Province: Munster
- County: Waterford
- Time zone: UTC+0 (WET)
  - Summer (DST): UTC-1 (IST (WEST))

Fenor, officially Fennor (Irish: Fionnúir), is a village in County Waterford, Ireland. The village itself is quite small, consisting almost entirely of the local school, pub, and parish church. It is on the R675 road around 5 km (3.1 mi) west of Tramore.

== History ==
=== Stone Age ===
Matthewstown Passage Tomb, constructed 2500–2000 BC, lies a mile to the north of Fenor.

=== Early Middle Ages ===
Fenor Parish, which in medieval times was known as the Parish of Islandkeane of the Barony of Middlethird. Traces of Iron Age habitation can be found on the promontory forts of Garrarus, Islandkeane, Kilfarassy and Woodstown. The Deise were converted to Christianity by St. Declan from their worship of the sun god. St. Declan was himself the son of a Deise Chieftain and this conversion pre-dated the coming of St. Patrick by about thirty years.

=== Norman times ===
After 1169, the Normans made their presence felt when the lands of the O'Faolain chieftains of the Deise were taken by the De Paors. The old parish church of Islandkeane was built by the Knights Templar. After their suppression their property was taken over by the Knights Hospitaller. They retained ownership of church house and its lands until King Henry VIII of England's Dissolution of the Monasteries.

== Parish church ==
The first church in Fenor village was built in the early 19th century, possibly before 1826, on lands donated by Lord de la Poer of Gurteen, Kilsheelin. This church, called the Church of Our Lady of the Nativity, was smaller than the present church and seated approximately 250 persons. The architect Walter G. Doolin designed the present church, completed in 1894.

== Fenor Bog ==
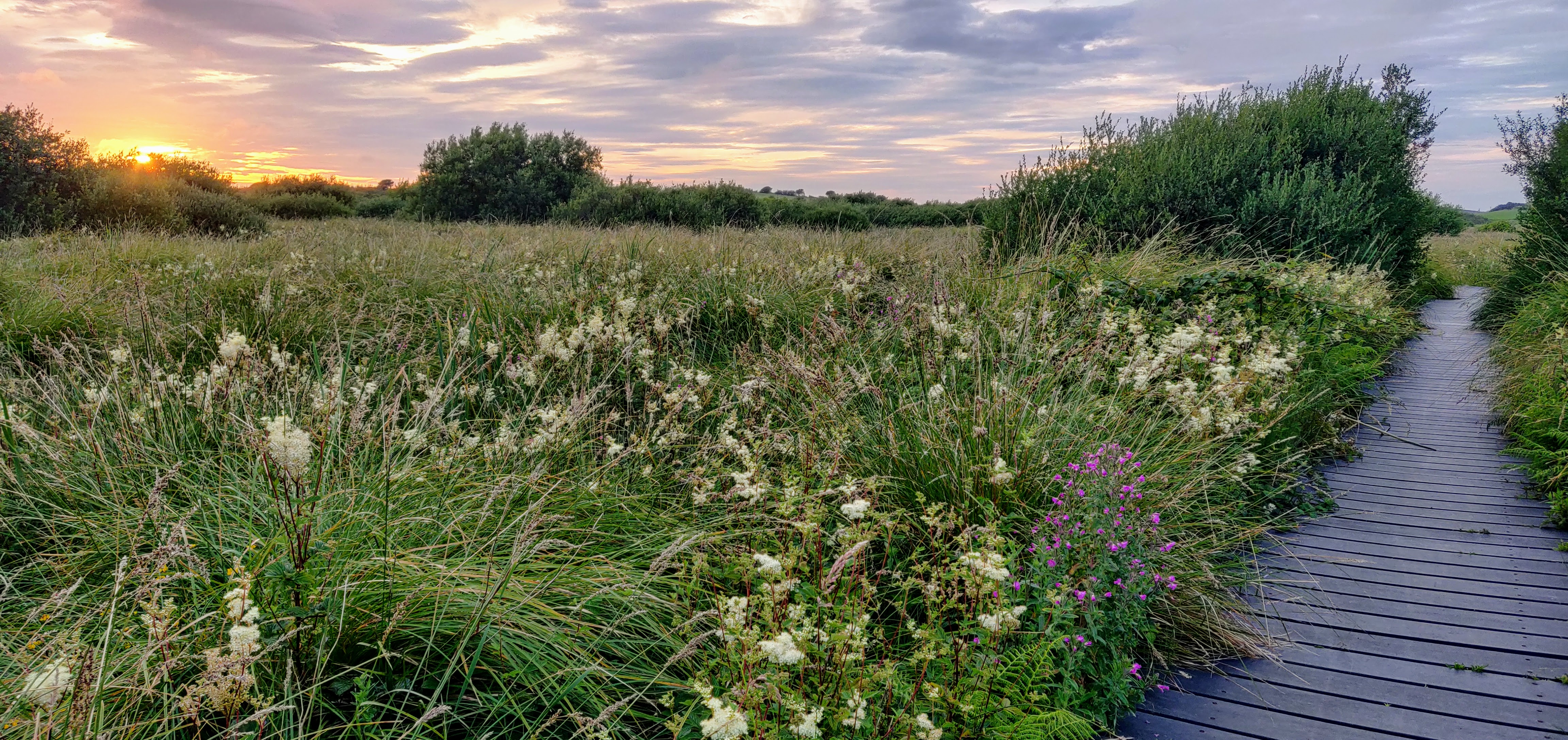
Fenor Bog in 2020

Fenor Bog was formerly a raised bog where turf was cut. Owned by the Irish Peatland Conservation Council it was designated as Waterford's first National Nature Reserve in 2004. During the 2016 heatwaves in Ireland, Fenor Bog suffered a major natural wildfire incident that was contained by the Waterford Fire Department, leaving some of its area permanently burned.

== Education ==
The first school in Fenor village was a slated building built in 1826 on marginal land at the edge of Fenor Bog. Lord de la Poer of Gurteen also donated this land to the parish. The school was fully paid for by local funds. There were 200 pupils on roll, 126 boys and 74 girls. In 1832, the Department of Education set up the National School system which would give free education to all children. This school continued to be used until 1946 when the present school was renovated and extended in 1986.

== Sports ==
Fenor GAA has a Gaelic Athletic Association club based in Fenor GAA pitch. The sport of road bowling is also played locally by Fenor Road Bowling Club, which is a overseen by the sport's national governing body, Bol Chumann Na hÉireann.
