= Fenor Bog =

Nature reserve in County Waterford, Ireland

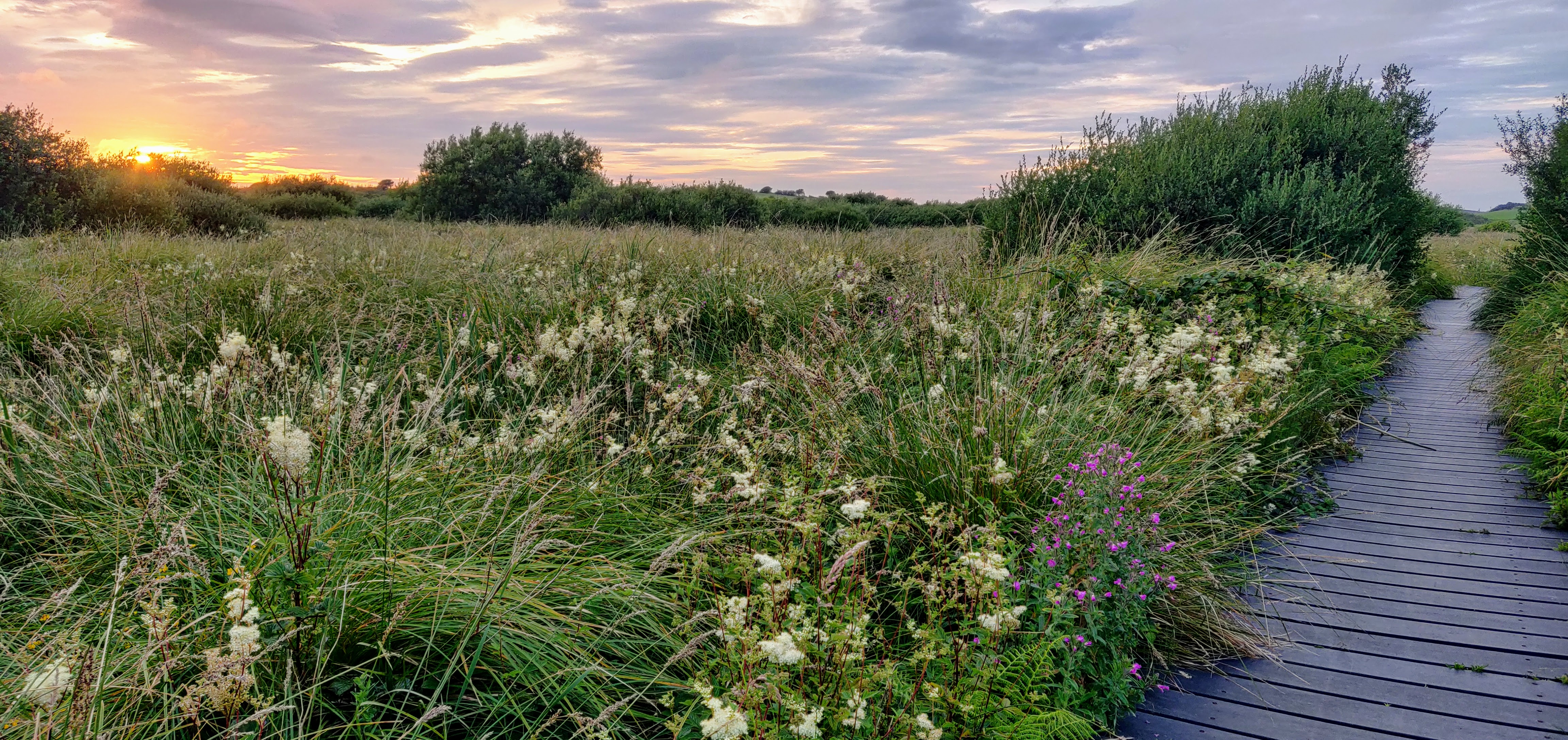
- Walkway in Fenor Bog
- Interactive map of Fenor Bog
- Location: County Waterford, Ireland
- Coordinates: 52°09′54″N 7°13′30″W
- Area: 32 acres (0.13 km^{2})
- Governing body: National Parks and Wildlife Service

Fenor Bog is a regenerated alkaline fen and national nature reserve of approximately 32 acres (0.13 km^{2}) in County Waterford. It is the county's first national nature reserve and the only extant alkaline fen in the southeast of Ireland.

== Features ==
Fenor Bog was legally protected as a national nature reserve by the Irish government in 2004, becoming County Waterford's first national nature reserve. The bog was purchased by the Irish Peatland Conservation Council (IPCC) and Moin Fhionnurach Development Association (MFDA) in June 1999 to protect the area from further decline. The funds were raised through bodies such as the Friends of the Bog. Fenor Bog is the only protected fen in County Waterford, and fen habitats are amongst the most endangered wetlands in Ireland.

Fenor Bog lies near the village of Fenor, and lies inside the Copper Coast Geopark. It is an alkaline fen, the only one of this kind still extant in the southeast of Ireland, with the bog located in a depression which is overlooked by Ballyscanlon Hill. There is a wet woodland on the site, with willow and alder trees, alongside areas of sedge, and flat, wet wild flower meadows. 200 species of mammals, birds, insects, and plants have been recorded within the site, including snipe, cuckoos, stonechats, warblers, reed buntings and barn owls. The site features a raised walkway.
