= Matthewstown Passage Tomb =

- Leaba Thomáis Mhic Cába
- Thomas McCabe's Bed
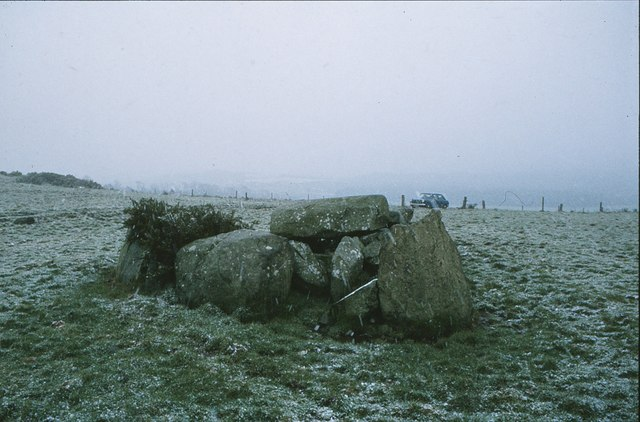
- The tomb in 1983

- Location within Ireland
- 52.175879°N 7.22726°W
- Type: kistvaen
- Periods: Neolithic
- Location: Matthewstown, Fenor, County Waterford, Ireland
- Part of: Scilly–Tramore group

History
- Built: c. 2250 BC

Site notes
- Material: Stone
- Public access: Yes

National monument of Ireland
- Official name: Matthewstown
- Reference no.: 237

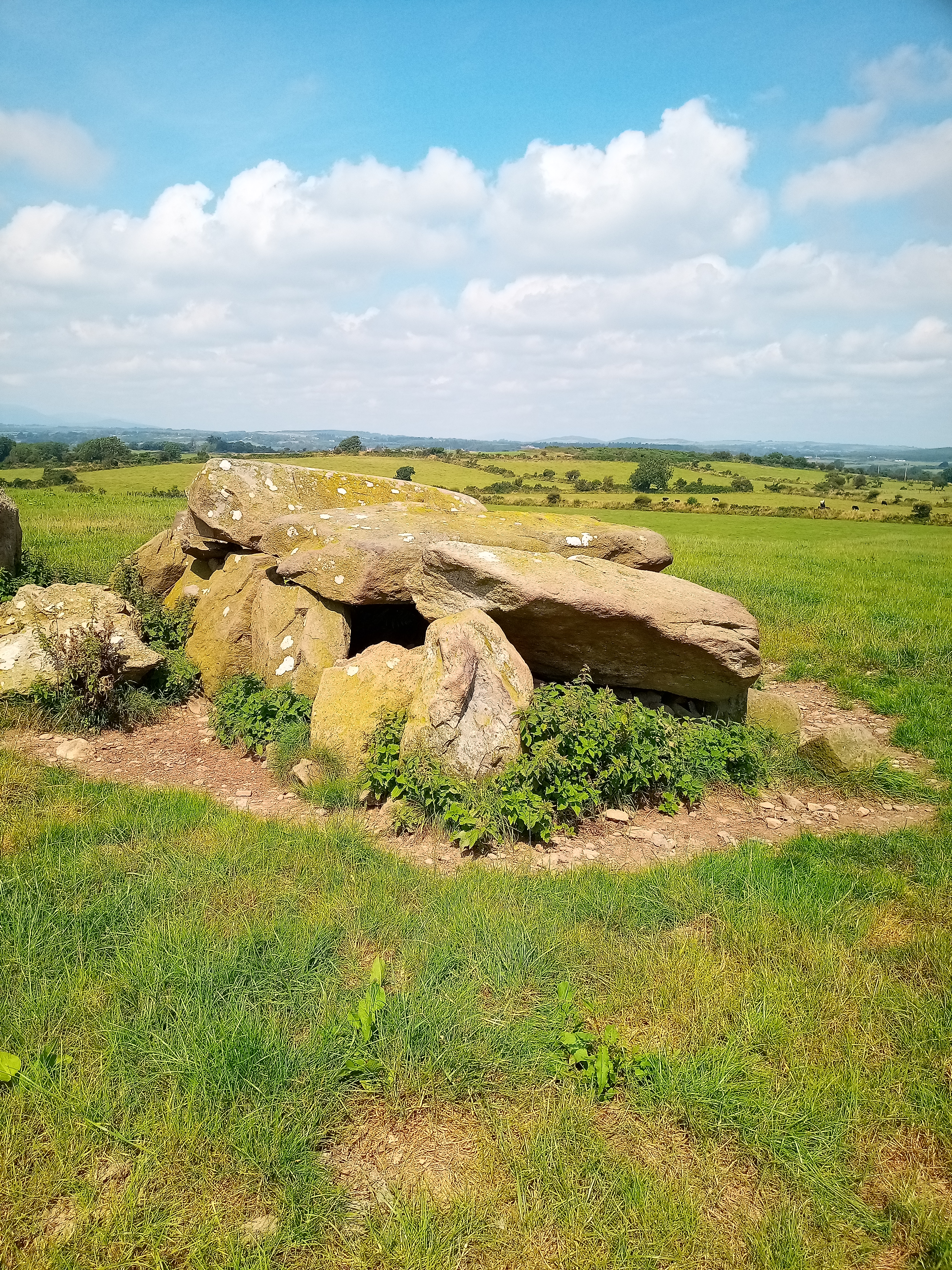
Matthewstown Passage Tomb, Matthewstown, County Waterford, Ireland

The Matthewstown Passage Tomb is a passage tomb situated in County Waterford, Ireland.

== Location ==
The tomb is located 1.6 km (1 mile) north of Fenor. Most of the surrounding countryside is visible, to the Comeragh Mountains.

== History ==
Matthewstown Passage Tomb dates to 2500–2000 BC. It is locally known as Thomas McCabe's Bed; this may have been the name of a local outlaw who supposedly spent a night here: cf. the many "Diarmuid and Gráinne's Beds"

This is one of a group of small passage tombs in County Waterford with affinities to the tombs in Cornwall and the Scilly Isles, hence the name "Scilly-Tramore group," suggesting that the builders were seafarers from Cornwall.

== Description ==
Matthewstown Passage Tomb is 4.5 m (fifteen feet) long and about 1.8 m (six feet) wide. There are two rows of five orthostats protruding above the ground to about 1 metre (three-and-a-half feet). This grave was covered by four large stone slabs.
