= Scragh Bog =

Nature reserve in County Westmeath, Ireland

- Interactive map of Scragh Bog
- Location: County Westmeath, Ireland
- Coordinates: 53°34′44″N 7°21′36″W
- Area: 56 acres (0.23 km^{2})
- Governing body: National Parks and Wildlife Service

Scragh Bog is a national nature reserve of approximately 56 acres (0.23 km^{2}) in County Westmeath. It is considered Ireland's best example of a habitat transitioning from an alkaline fen to an acidic raised bog, and is deemed to be of international importance.

== Features ==
Scragh Bog was legally protected as a national nature reserve by the Irish government in 1992. A large area of the bog was bought by the Irish Peatland Conservation Council with funding from the Dutch Foundation for the Conservation of Irish Bogs in 1987. It was later handed over to the Irish state to be managed as a nature reserve.

Scragh Bog is deemed to be Ireland's best example of a habitat transitioning from an alkaline fen to an acidic raised bog, one of only a small number still extant in Europe and of international importance. A large number of rare flora and insects in Europe have been recorded in the reserve. Some of the flora include sundew, round-leaved wintergreen, and sphagnum moss. The creation of the nature reserve was cited as the reason that a number of rare insects have been conserved in Ireland.

Skylarks and common snipe live on the reserve. The site has a number of boardwalk routes for visitors.
