= River Cummeragh =

River in County Kerry, Ireland

Coordinates: 51°50′33″N 10°06′42″W

The River Cummeragh (Irish: An Comarach) is a river in County Kerry, Ireland.

The river rises in the Dunkerron Mountains on the Iveragh Peninsula. It meanders in a generally south-westerly direction, flowing into the north-eastern side of Lough Currane. The Kerry Way crosses the river at Cahersavane Bridge. There is a 109-metre (358 ft) drop over its 8.5-kilometre (5.3 mi) length from Lough Derriana at 113 metres (371 ft) to Lough Currane at 4 metres (13 ft). The lakes of the river basin are known for their fishing.
