= Irish Peatland Conservation Council =

Irish charitable organisation

- Comhairle Chaomhnaithe Phortaigh na hÉireann
- logo
- Established: 1982
- Type: NGO
- Purpose: Protect the bogs of Ireland, educate about them
- Headquarters: Bog of Allen, County Kildare
- Region served: Ireland
- Website: www.ipcc.ie

The Irish Peatland Conservation Council (IPCC; Irish: Comhairle Chaomhnaithe Phortaigh na hÉireann) is a national charitable organisation established in 1982 to conserve and protect a representative sample of bogs in Ireland, and to campaign on bog-related issues.

== History ==
After a debate in University College Dublin, held by An Taisce to explore the future of Irish peatlands, the National Peatland Conservation Committee (NPCC), led by Professor Gerry Doyle, was established in 1982. The NPCC was a voluntary organisation which engaged in such actions as developing the first inventory of Irish peatland sites, developing a conservation action plan, and proposing a management structure for an organisation to campaign for peatlands. In 1985, the NPCC resigned and the IPCC was created, led by Dr Neil Lockhart.

== Operations ==
The council's headquarters and a retail outlet are located at the Bog of Allen Nature Centre, Lullymore, Rathangan, County Kildare. The IPCC owns and manage six sites as reserves for peatland conservation:

- Coad Bog, Co. Kerry (blanket bog)
- Fenor Bog, Co. Waterford (regenerating valley fen)
- Girley Bog, Co. Meath (raised bog, wet grassland and birch woodland)
- Ketts Lough, Co. Clare (transition mire)
- Lullymore West Bog, Co. Kildare (cutover bog with species-rich grassland)
- Lodge Bog, Co. Kildare (raised bog)

Its offices and a shop had previously been situated on Capel Street in Dublin city centre.

== Objectives ==
The IPCC, on their website, state that their mission is to "conserve a representative sample of the peatlands of Ireland for people to enjoy now and in the future."

IPCC's conservation aims and objectives are set out in a series of Action Plans. As of 2025, the current and seventh action plan by the IPCC is Peatlands and Climate Change Action Plan 2030, published in 2021.

"The overall aims of this action plan are to ensure the protection of peatlands currently in good condition and supporting their range of ecosystem functions and to enhance the resilience to climate change of the entire country’s peatlands through management, funding, education and collective effort.

The IPCC is a registered charity (CHY6829) and a voluntary, non-profit, non-governmental organisation. It is not routinely state-funded and relies primarily on public support (almost 60% of the IPCC income is from voluntary donations). It is a member of, and supported by, the Irish Environmental Network, a grouping of Irish environmental NGOs, as well as the National Parks and Wildlife Service Peatlands and Natura Community Engagement Scheme, the Heritage Organisational Support Fund of the Irish Heritage Council.

== Publications ==
An account of the first fifteen years of the Save the Bogs campaign is contained in Save the Bogs Story. IPCC also produces a semi-annual campaign newsletter titled Peatland News, available to members of the organisation. Action for Bogs is another regular bulletin published by the IPCC, updating readers on current peatland news and campaigns. The IPCC publishes educational material, strategy papers and policy work on their website.

=== Action plans and conservation plans ===
- Irish Peatland Conservation Council (1989) Irish peatland conservation programme : The IPCC action plan 1989-1992. Dublin, Ireland: Irish Peatland Conservation Council.
- Irish Peatland Conservation Council (1992) Policy statement & action plan. Dublin: Irish Peatland Conservation Council.
- Irish Peatland Conservation Council (1992) Irish Peatland Conservation Council policy statement & action plan, 1992-1997. Dublin: Irish Peatland Conservation Council.
- Foss, P.J. and O’Connell, C. (1996) Irish peatland conservation plan 2000. Dublin: Irish Peatland Conservation Council.
- Foss, P.J. (2001) Bogs & fens of Ireland : conservation plan 2005. Irish Peatland Conservation Council
- Irish Peatland Conservation Council (2009) Ireland’s peatland conservation action plan 2020: halting the loss of peatland biodiversity. Rathangan, Co. Kildare: Irish Peatland Conservation Council.
- O’Connell, C. et al. (2021) Peatlands & climate change action plan 2030: healthy peatlands provide a natural solution to reducing greenhouse gas omissions. Rathangan, Co. Kildare: Irish Peatland Conservation Council.

Some other key publications include:

- Dwyer, R.B. (2000) Protecting nature in Ireland: the NGO Special Areas of Conservation shadow list. Dublin: Irish Peatland Conservation Council.
- Foss, P.J. (1991) Irish peatlands, the critical decade: International Mire Conservation Group excursion & symposium proceedings, Ireland 1990. Dublin: Irish Peatland Conservation Council.
- Irish Peatland Conservation Council (1988) The IPCC guide to Irish Peatlands.
- Irish Peatland Conservation Council (1990) The wild beauty of bogs.
- Irish Peatland Conservation Council (1992) Our story: 10 years of the Save the Bogs campaign.
- Irish Peatland Conservation Council (1997) The save the bogs story: 15 years of Irish and Dutch people working to save the bogs.
- O’Connell, C. (1992) Áis oideachais na bportach.

== See also ==
- 2003 Derrybrien landslide
