= Diesel locomotive =

Locomotive powered by a diesel engine

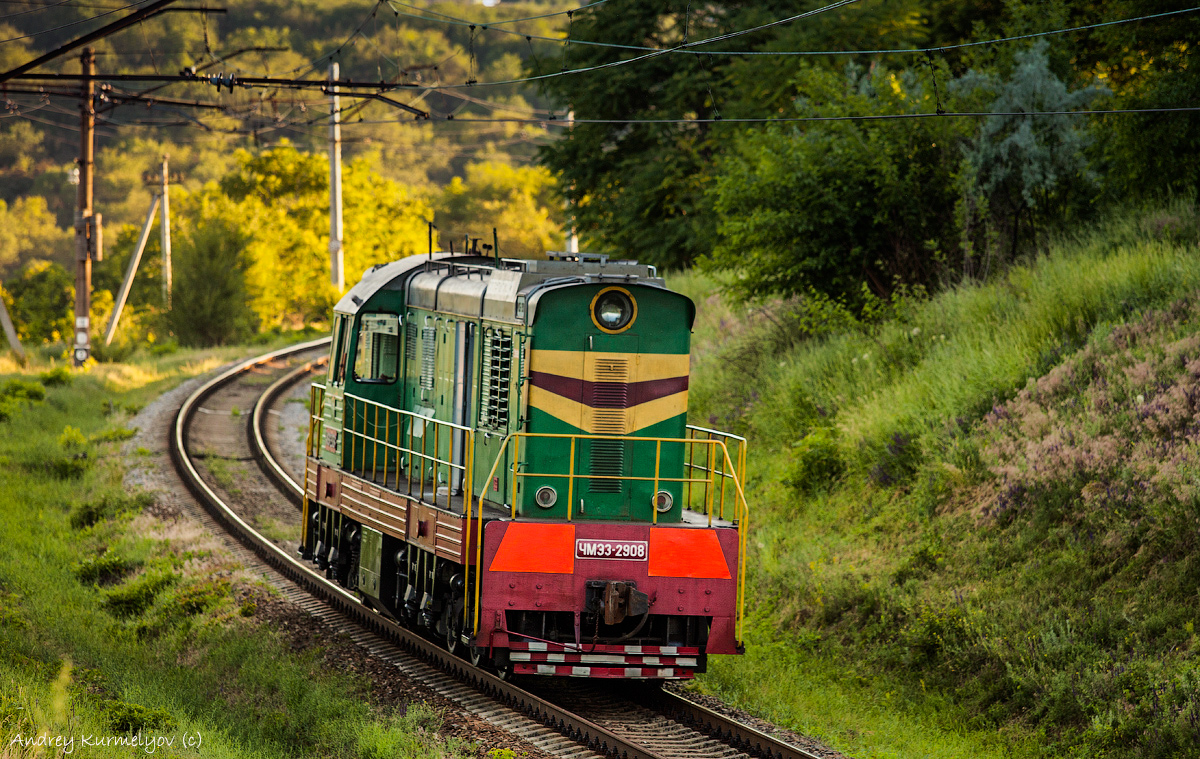
The ČKD ČME3, a common example of a diesel shunting locomotive

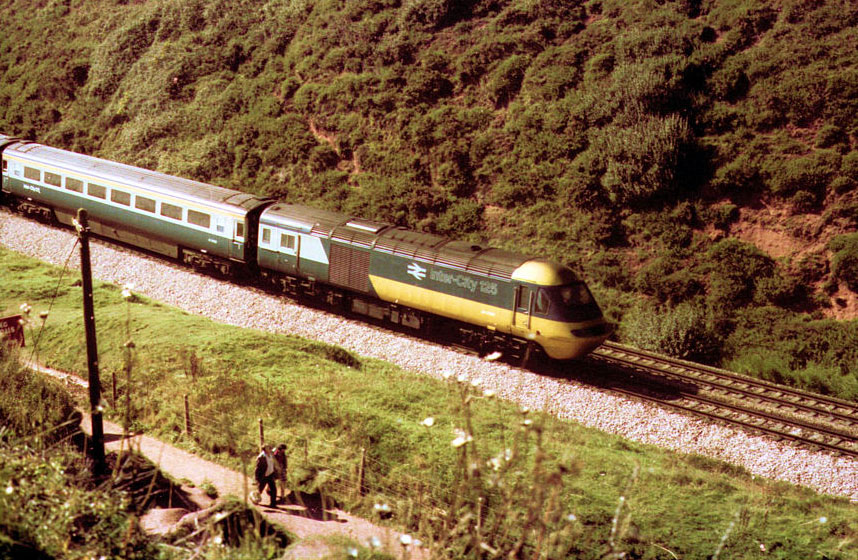
The InterCity 125 set a speed record – 148 mph (238 km/h) – for a diesel-powered train in 1987. Capable of 125 mph (201 km/h) in regular service, the train consists of two power cars with either seven or eight carriages between them.

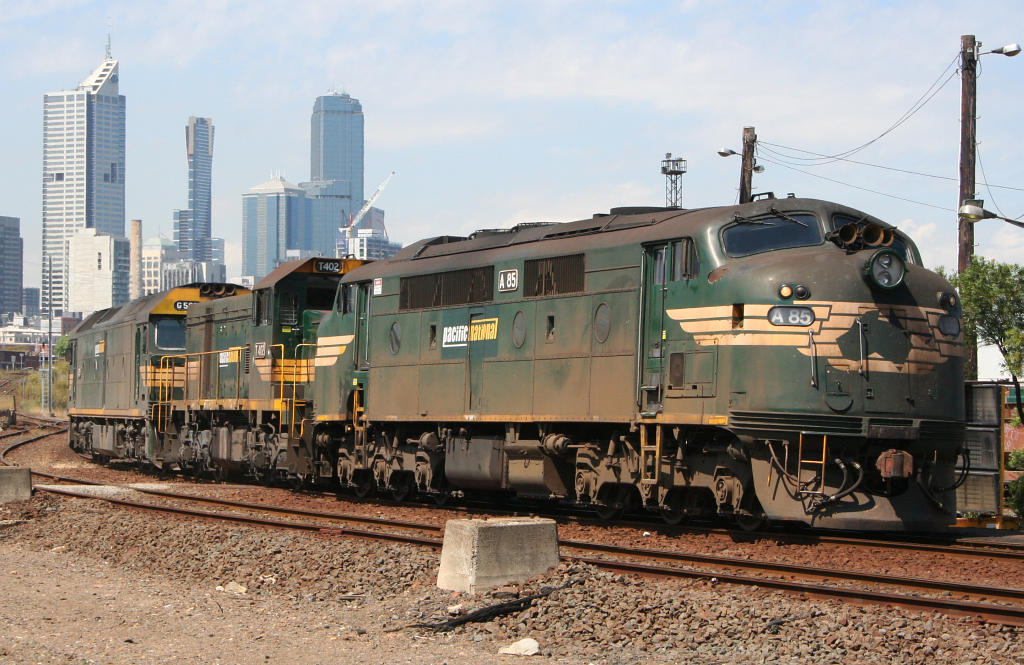
These locomotives operated by Pacific National in Australia show three styles of diesel locomotive body: cab unit (front), hood unit, and flat-nose (rear).

A diesel locomotive is a type of railway locomotive in which the power source is a diesel engine. Several types of diesel locomotives have been developed, differing mainly in the means by which mechanical power is conveyed to the driving wheels. The most common are diesel–electric locomotives and diesel–hydraulic.

Early internal combustion locomotives and railcars used kerosene and gasoline as their fuel. Rudolf Diesel patented his first compression-ignition engine in 1898, and steady improvements to the design of diesel engines reduced their physical size and improved their power-to-weight ratios to a point where one could be mounted in a locomotive. Internal combustion engines only operate efficiently within a limited power band, and while low-power gasoline engines could be coupled to mechanical transmissions, the more powerful diesel engines required the development of new forms of transmission. This is because clutches would need to be very large at these power levels and would not fit in a standard 2.5 m (8 ft 2 in)-wide locomotive frame, or would wear too quickly to be useful.

The first successful diesel engines used diesel–electric transmissions, and by 1925 a small number of diesel locomotives of 600 hp (450 kW) were in service in the United States. In 1930, Armstrong Whitworth of the United Kingdom delivered two 1,200 hp (890 kW) locomotives using Sulzer-designed engines to Buenos Aires Great Southern Railway of Argentina. In 1933, diesel–electric technology developed by Maybach was used to propel the DRG Class SVT 877, a high-speed intercity two-car set, and went into series production with other streamlined car sets in Germany starting in 1935. In the United States, diesel–electric propulsion was brought to high-speed mainline passenger service in late 1934, largely through the research and development efforts of General Motors dating back to the late 1920s and advances in lightweight car body design by the Budd Company.

The economic recovery from World War II hastened the widespread adoption of diesel locomotives in many countries. They offered greater flexibility and performance than steam locomotives, as well as substantially lower operating and maintenance costs.

== History ==
=== Adaptation for rail use ===
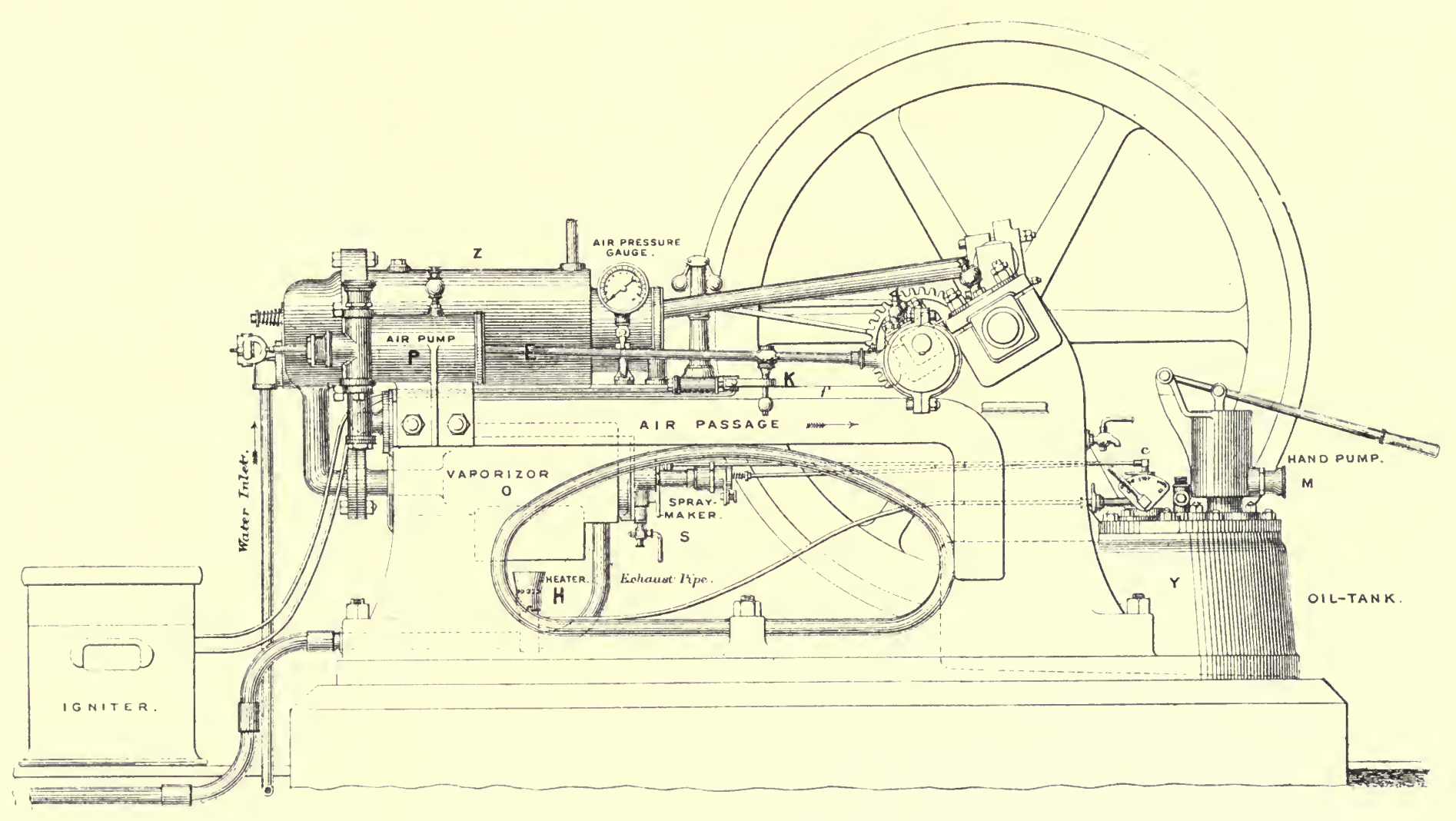
Diagram of Priestman oil engine from The Steam engine and gas and oil engines (1900) by John Perry

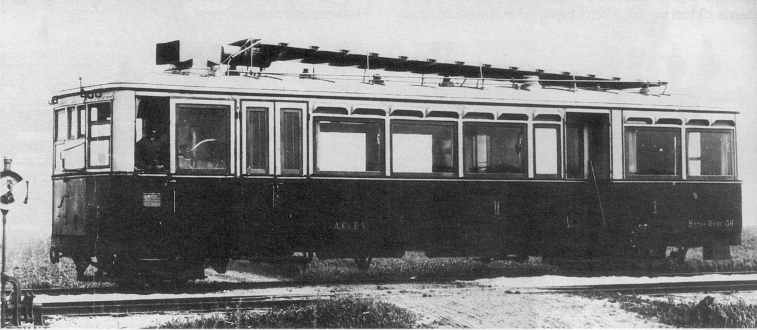
Petrol–electric Weitzer railmotor, first 1903, series 1906

The earliest recorded example of the use of an internal combustion engine in a railway locomotive is the prototype designed by William Dent Priestman, which was examined by William Thomson, 1st Baron Kelvin in 1888 who described it as a "Priestman oil engine mounted upon a truck which is worked on a temporary line of rails to show the adaptation of a petroleum engine for locomotive purposes." In 1894, a 20 hp (15 kW) two-axle machine built by Priestman Brothers was used on the Hull Docks. In 1896, an oil-engined railway locomotive was built for the Royal Arsenal in Woolwich, England, using an engine designed by Herbert Akroyd Stuart. It was not a diesel, because it used a hot-bulb engine (also known as a semi-diesel), but it was the precursor of the diesel.

Rudolf Diesel considered using his engine for powering locomotives in his 1893 book Theorie und Konstruktion eines rationellen Wärmemotors zum Ersatz der Dampfmaschine und der heute bekannten Verbrennungsmotoren (Theory and Construction of a Rational Heat Motor). However, the large size and poor power-to-weight ratio of early diesel engines made them unsuitable for propelling land-based vehicles. Therefore, the engine's potential as a railroad prime mover was not initially recognized. This changed as research and development reduced the size and weight of the engine.

In 1906, Rudolf Diesel, Adolf Klose and the steam and diesel engine manufacturer Gebrüder Sulzer founded Diesel-Sulzer-Klose GmbH to manufacture diesel-powered locomotives. Sulzer had been manufacturing diesel engines since 1898. The Prussian State Railways ordered a diesel locomotive from the company in 1909, and after test runs between Winterthur and Romanshorn, Switzerland, the diesel–mechanical locomotive was delivered in Berlin in September 1912. The world's first diesel-powered locomotive was operated in the summer of 1912 on the same line from Winterthur but was not a commercial success. During test runs in 1913 several problems were found. The outbreak of World War I in 1914 prevented all further trials. The locomotive weight was 95 tonnes and the power was 883 kW (1,184 hp) with a maximum speed of 100 km/h (62 mph).

Small numbers of prototype diesel locomotives were produced in a number of countries through the mid-1920s.

=== Early diesel locomotives and railcars in Asia ===
==== China ====
One of the first domestically developed Diesel vehicles of China was the Dongfeng DMU (东风), produced in 1958 by CSR Sifang. Series production of China's first Diesel locomotive class, the DFH1, began in 1964 following the construction of a prototype in 1959.

==== Japan ====
In Japan, starting in the 1920s, some petrol–electric railcars were produced. The first diesel–electric traction and the first air-streamed vehicles on Japanese rails were the two DMU3s of class Kiha 43000 (キハ43000系). Japan's first series of diesel locomotives was class DD50 (国鉄DD50形), twin locomotives, developed since 1950 and in service since 1953.

=== Early diesel locomotives and railcars in Europe ===
==== First functional diesel vehicles ====
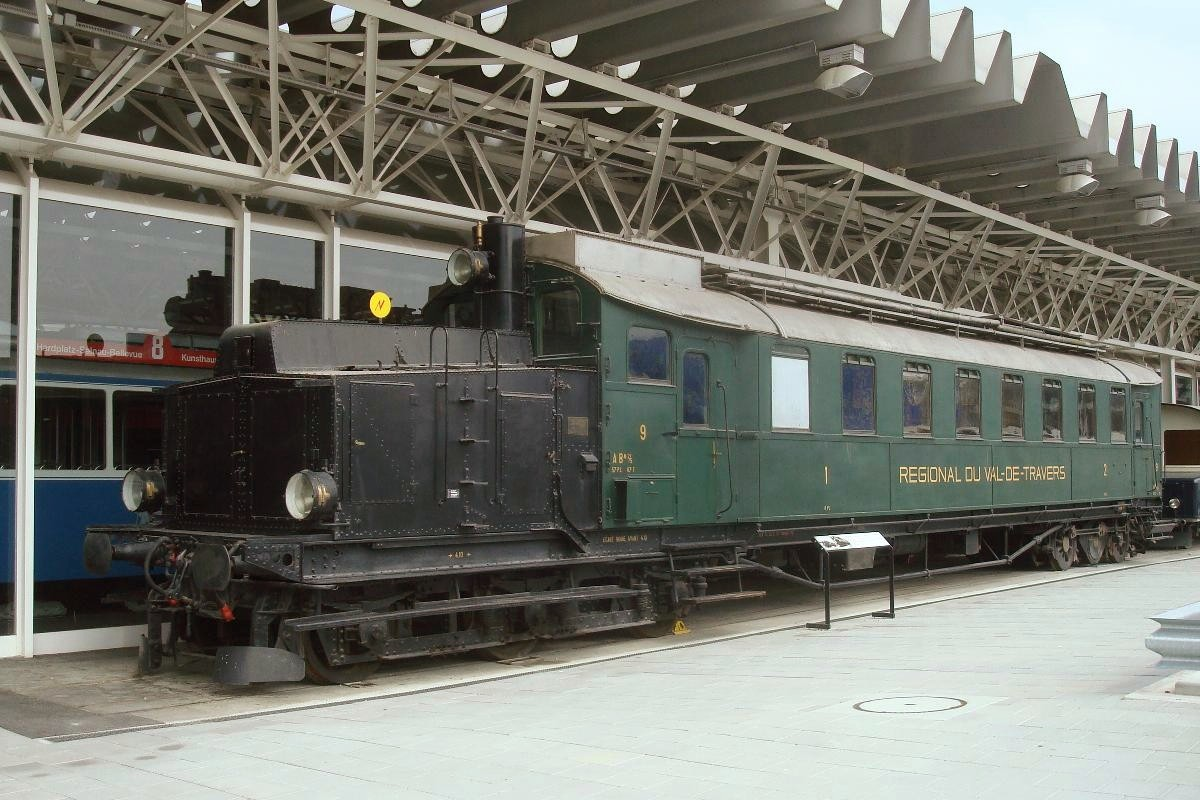
Swiss and German co-production: world's first functional diesel–electric railcar, 1914

In 1914, the world's first functional diesel–electric railcars were produced for the Königlich-Sächsische Staatseisenbahnen (Royal Saxon State Railways) by Waggonfabrik Rastatt with electric equipment from Brown, Boveri & Cie and diesel engines from Swiss Sulzer AG. They were classified as DET 1 and DET 2 (de.wiki). Because of a shortage of petrol products during World War I, they remained unused for regular service in Germany. In 1922, they were sold to Swiss Compagnie du Chemin de fer Régional du Val-de-Travers, where they were used in regular service up to the electrification of the line in 1944. Afterwards, the company kept them in service as boosters until 1965.

Fiat claims to have built the first Italian diesel–electric locomotive in 1922, but little detail is available. Several Fiat-TIBB Bo'Bo' diesel–locomotives were built for service on the 950 mm (3 ft 1 3/8 in) narrow gauge Ferrovie Calabro Lucane and the Società per le Strade Ferrate del Mediterrano in southern Italy in 1926, following trials in 1924–25. The six-cylinder two-stroke motor produced 440 horsepower (330 kW) at 500 rpm, driving four DC motors, one for each axle. These 44 tonnes (43 long tons; 49 short tons) locomotives with 45 km/h (28 mph) top speed proved quite successful.

In 1924, two diesel–electric locomotives were taken in service by the Soviet railways, almost at the same time:

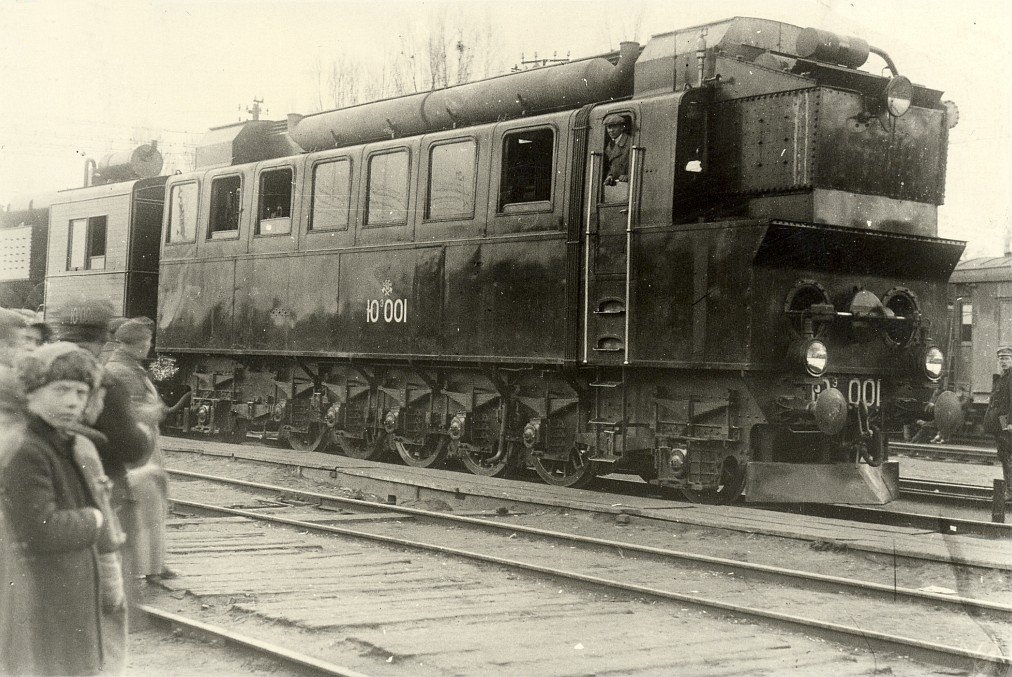
The Soviet-designed, German-built E el‑2 diesel–electric, introduced in 1925, remained in service until 1954.

- The engine Э^{эл}2 (E^{el}2 original number Юэ 001/Yu-e 001) started on October 22. It had been designed by a team led by Yuri Lomonosov and built 1923–1924 by Maschinenfabrik Esslingen in Germany. It had five driving axles (1'E1'). After several test rides, it hauled trains for almost three decades from 1925 to 1954. It became a model for several classes of Soviet diesel locomotives.
- The engine Щэл1 (Shch-el 1, original number Юэ2/Yu-e 2), started on November 9. It had been developed by Yakov Modestovich Gakkel and built by Baltic Shipyard in Saint Petersburg. It had ten driving axles in three bogies (1' Co' Do' Co' 1'). From 1925 to 1927, it hauled trains between Moscow and Kursk and in Caucasus region. Due to technical problems, afterwards, it was out of service. Since 1934, it was used as a stationary electric generator.

In 1935, Krauss-Maffei, MAN and Voith built the first diesel–hydraulic locomotive, called V 140, in Germany. Diesel–hydraulics became the mainstream in diesel locomotives in Germany since the German railways (DRG) were pleased with the performance of that engine. Serial production of diesel locomotives in Germany began after World War II.

==== Switchers ====
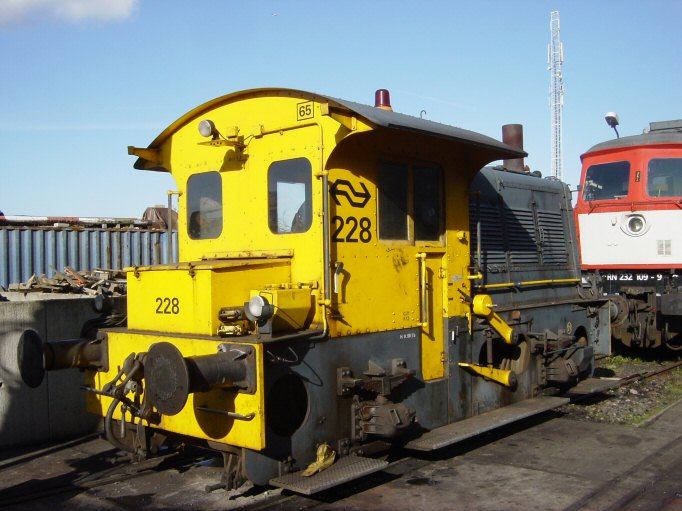
Shunter of Nederlandse Spoorwegen from 1934, in modern livery

In many railway stations and industrial compounds, steam shunters had to be kept hot during many breaks between scattered short tasks. Therefore, diesel traction became economical for shunting before it became economical for hauling trains. The construction of diesel shunters began in 1920 in France, in 1925 in Denmark, in 1926 in the Netherlands, and in 1927 in Germany. After a few years of testing, hundreds of units were produced within a decade.

==== Diesel railcars for regional traffic ====
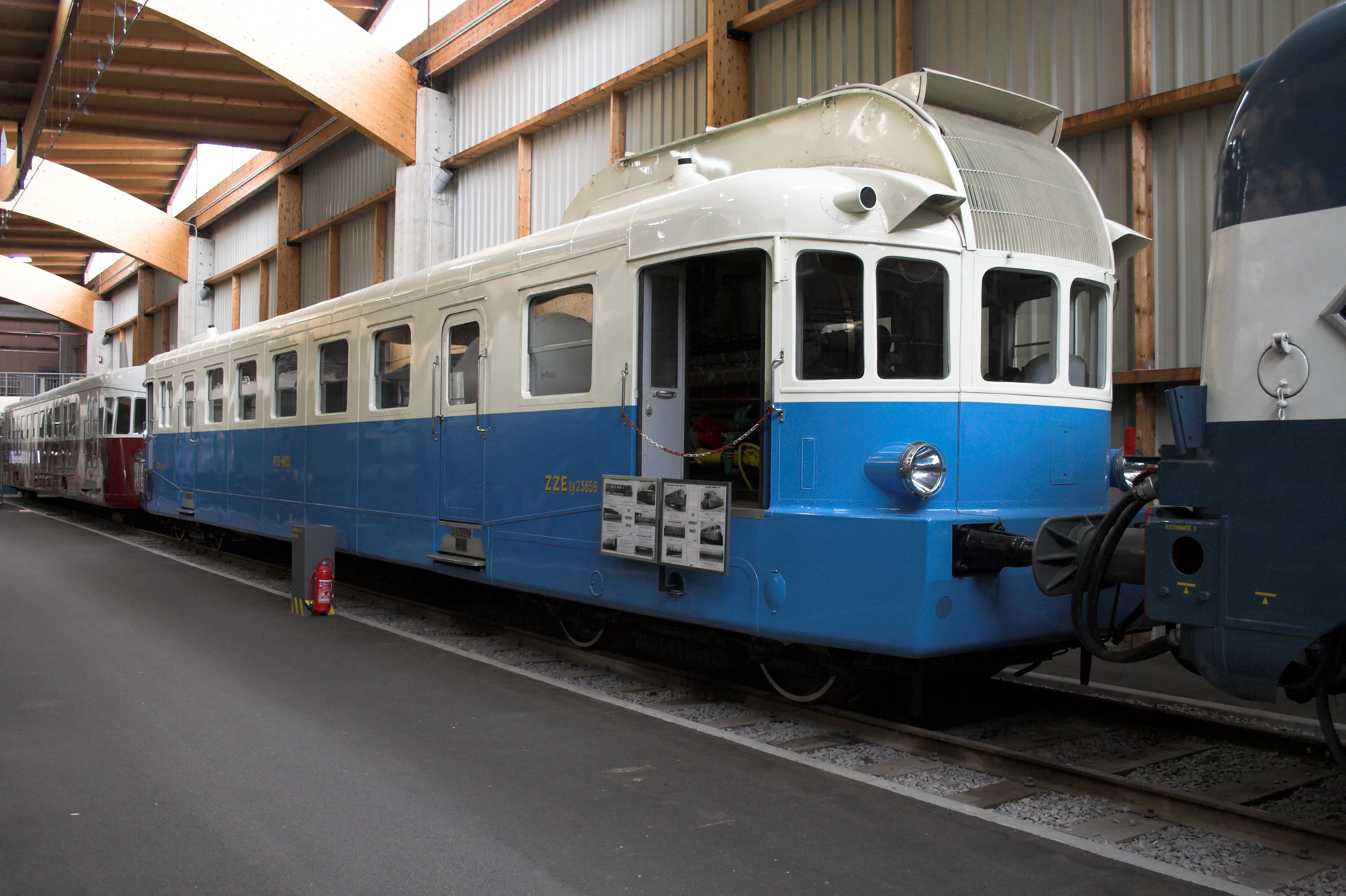
Renault VH, France, 1933/34

Diesel-powered or "oil-engined" railcars, generally diesel–mechanical, were developed by various European manufacturers in the 1930s, e.g. by William Beardmore and Company for the Canadian National Railways (the Beardmore Tornado engine was subsequently used in the R101 airship). Some of those series for regional traffic were begun with gasoline motors and then continued with diesel motors, such as Hungarian BC^{mot} (The class code doesn't tell anything but "railmotor with 2nd and 3rd class seats".), 128 cars built 1926–1937, or German Wismar railbuses (57 cars 1932–1941). In France, the first diesel railcar was Renault VH, 115 units produced 1933/34. In Italy, after six Gasoline cars since 1931, Fiat and Breda built a lot of diesel railmotors, more than 110 from 1933 to 1938 and 390 from 1940 to 1953, Class 772 known as Littorina, and Class ALn 900.

==== High-speed railcars ====
In the 1930s, streamlined highspeed diesel railcars were developed in several countries:

- In Germany, the Flying Hamburger was built in 1932. After a test ride in December 1932, this two-coach diesel railcar (in English terminology a DMU2) started service at Deutsche Reichsbahn (DRG) in February 1933. It became the prototype of DRG Class SVT 137 with 33 more highspeed DMUs, built for DRG till 1938, 13 DMU 2 ("Hamburg" series), 18 DMU 3 ("Leipzig" and "Köln" series), and two DMU 4 ("Berlin" series).
- French SNCF classes XF 1000 and XF 1100 comprised 11 high-speed DMUs, also called TAR, built 1934–1939.
- In Hungary, Ganz Works built the Arpád railmotor, a kind of a luxurious railbus in a series of seven items since 1934 and started to build the Hargita in 1944.

==== Further developments ====
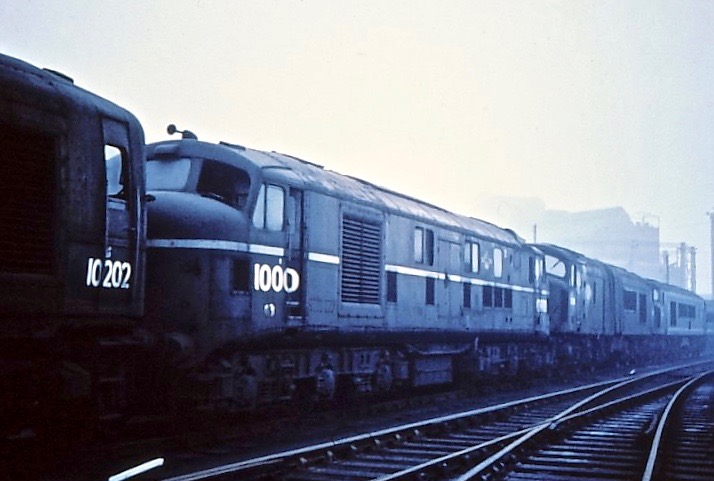
British Rail Class D16/1, since 1948

In 1945, a batch of 30 Baldwin diesel–electric locomotives, Baldwin 0-6-6-0 1000, was delivered from the United States to the railways of the Soviet Union.

In 1947, the London, Midland and Scottish Railway (LMS) introduced the first of a pair of 1,600 hp (1,200 kW) Co-Co diesel–electric locomotives (later British Rail Class D16/1) for regular use in the United Kingdom, although British manufacturers such as Armstrong Whitworth had been exporting diesel locomotives since 1930. Fleet deliveries to British Railways, of other designs such as Class 20 and Class 31, began in 1957.

Series production of diesel locomotives in Italy began in the mid-1950s. Generally, diesel traction in Italy was of less importance than in other countries, as it was amongst the most advanced countries in the electrification of the main lines and as Italian geography makes freight transport by sea cheaper than rail transportation even on many domestic connections.

=== Early diesel locomotives and railcars in North America ===
==== Early North American developments ====
Adolphus Busch purchased the American manufacturing rights for the diesel engine in 1898 but never applied this new form of power to transportation. He founded the Busch-Sulzer company in 1911. Only limited success was achieved in the early twentieth century with internal combustion engined railcars, due, in part, to difficulties with mechanical drive systems.

General Electric (GE) entered the railcar market in the early twentieth century, as Thomas Edison possessed a patent on the electric locomotive, his design actually being a type of electrically propelled railcar. GE built its first electric locomotive prototype in 1895. However, high electrification costs caused GE to turn its attention to internal combustion power to provide electricity for electric railcars. Problems related to co-ordinating the prime mover and electric motor were immediately encountered, primarily due to limitations of the Ward Leonard current control system that had been chosen. GE Rail was formed in 1907 and 112 years later, in 2019, was purchased by and merged with Wabtec.

A significant breakthrough occurred in 1914, when Hermann Lemp, a GE electrical engineer, developed and patented a reliable control system that controlled the engine and traction motor with a single lever; subsequent improvements were also patented by Lemp. Lemp's design solved the problem of overloading and damaging the traction motors with excessive electrical power at low speeds, and was the prototype for all internal combustion–electric drive control systems.

In 1917–1918, GE produced three experimental diesel–electric locomotives using Lemp's control design, the first known to be built in the United States. Following this development, the 1923 Kaufman Act banned steam locomotives from New York City, because of severe pollution problems. The response to this law was to electrify high-traffic rail lines. However, electrification was uneconomical to apply to lower-traffic areas.

The first regular use of diesel–electric locomotives was in switching (shunter) applications, which were more forgiving than mainline applications of the limitations of contemporary diesel technology and where the idling economy of diesel relative to steam would be most beneficial. GE entered a collaboration with the American Locomotive Company (ALCO) and Ingersoll-Rand (the "AGEIR" consortium) in 1924 to produce a prototype 300 hp (220 kW) "boxcab" locomotive delivered in July 1925. This locomotive demonstrated that the diesel–electric power unit could provide many of the benefits of an electric locomotive without the railroad having to bear the sizeable expense of electrification. The unit successfully demonstrated, in switching and local freight and passenger service, on ten railroads and three industrial lines. Westinghouse Electric and Baldwin collaborated to build switching locomotives starting in 1929. However, the Great Depression curtailed demand for Westinghouse's electrical equipment, and they stopped building locomotives internally, opting to supply electrical parts instead.

In June 1925, Baldwin Locomotive Works outshopped a prototype diesel–electric locomotive for "special uses" (such as for runs where water for steam locomotives was scarce) using electrical equipment from Westinghouse Electric Company. Its twin-engine design was not successful, and the unit was scrapped after a short testing and demonstration period. Industry sources were beginning to suggest "the outstanding advantages of this new form of motive power". In 1929, the Canadian National Railways became the first North American railway to use diesels in mainline service with two units, 9000 and 9001, from Westinghouse. However, these early diesels proved expensive and unreliable, with their high cost of acquisition relative to steam unable to be realized in operating cost savings as they were frequently out of service. It would be another five years before diesel–electric propulsion would be successfully used in mainline service, and nearly ten years before fully replacing steam became a real prospect with existing diesel technology.

Before diesel power could make inroads into mainline service, the limitations of diesel engines circa 1930 – low power-to-weight ratios and narrow output range – had to be overcome. A major effort to overcome those limitations was launched by General Motors after they moved into the diesel field with their acquisition of the Winton Engine Company, a major manufacturer of diesel engines for marine and stationary applications, in 1930. Supported by the General Motors Research Division, GM's Winton Engine Corporation sought to develop diesel engines suitable for high-speed mobile use. The first milestone in that effort was delivery in early 1934 of the Winton 201A, a two-stroke, mechanically aspirated, uniflow-scavenged, unit-injected diesel engine that could deliver the required performance for a fast, lightweight passenger train. The second milestone, and the one that got American railroads moving towards diesel, was the 1938 delivery of GM's Model 567 engine that was designed specifically for locomotive use, bringing a fivefold increase in life of some mechanical parts and showing its potential for meeting the rigors of freight service.

Diesel–electric railroad locomotion entered mainline service when the Burlington Route and Union Pacific used custom-built diesel "streamliners" to haul passengers, starting in late 1934. Burlington's Zephyr trainsets evolved from articulated three-car sets with 600 hp power cars in 1934 and early 1935, to the Denver Zephyr semi-articulated ten car trainsets pulled by cab-booster power sets introduced in late 1936. Union Pacific started diesel streamliner service between Chicago and Portland Oregon in June 1935, and in the following year would add Los Angeles, CA, Oakland, CA, and Denver, CO to the destinations of diesel streamliners out of Chicago. The Burlington and Union Pacific streamliners were built by the Budd Company and the Pullman-Standard Company, respectively, using the new Winton engines and power train systems designed by GM's Electro-Motive Corporation. EMC's experimental 1800 hp B-B locomotives of 1935 demonstrated the multiple-unit control systems used for the cab/booster sets and the twin-engine format used with the later Zephyr power units. Both of those features would be used in EMC's later production model locomotives. The lightweight diesel streamliners of the mid-1930s demonstrated the advantages of diesel for passenger service with breakthrough schedule times, but diesel locomotive power would not fully come of age until regular series production of mainline diesel locomotives commenced and it was shown suitable for full-size passenger and freight service.

==== First American series production locomotives ====
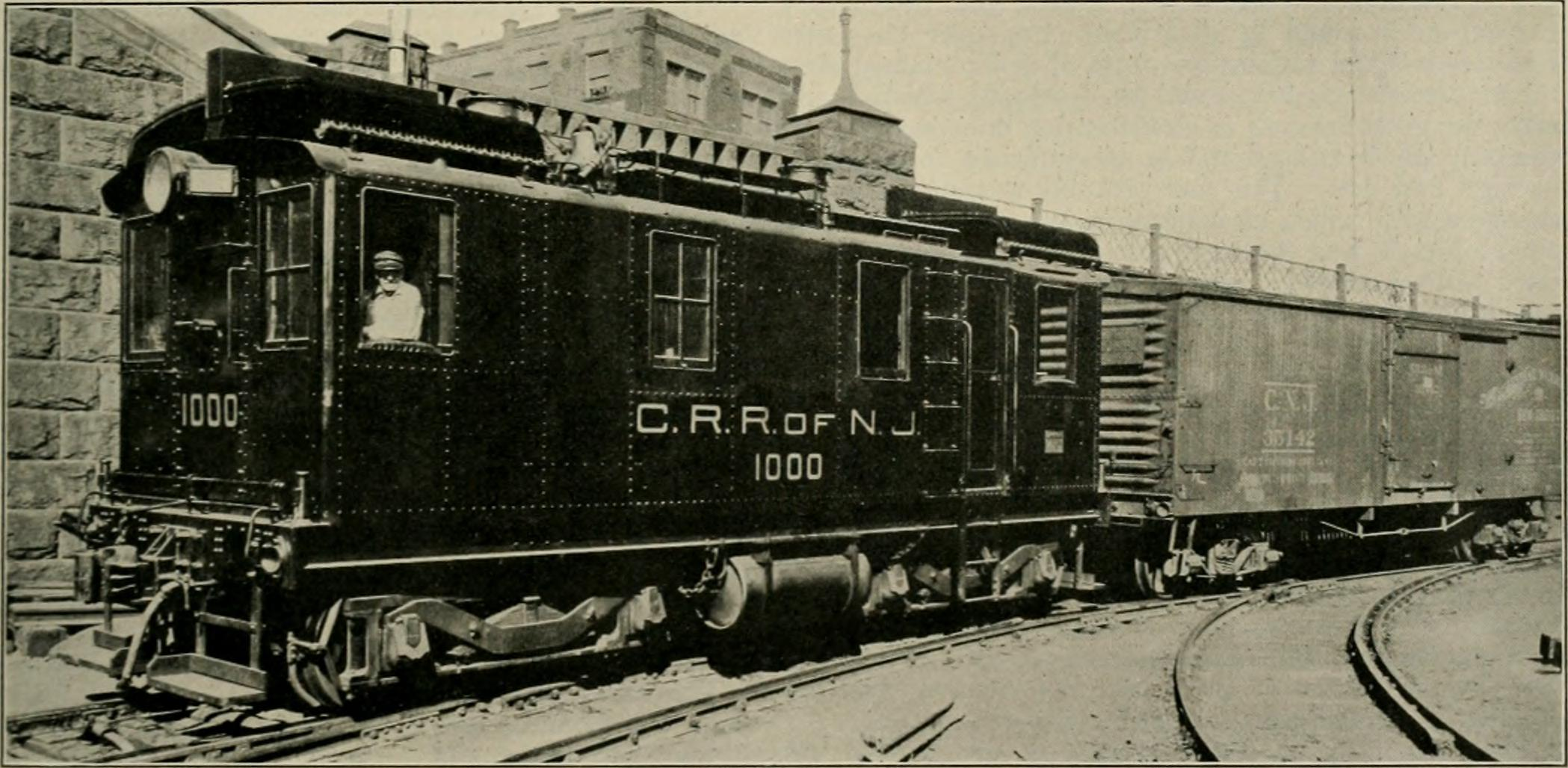
CNJ 1000, the first production-built diesel locomotive in America.

Following their 1925 prototype, the AGEIR consortium produced 25 more units of 300 hp (220 kW) "60 ton" AGEIR boxcab switching locomotives between 1925 and 1928 for several New York City railroads, making them the first series-produced diesel locomotives. The consortium also produced seven twin-engine "100 ton" boxcabs and one hybrid trolley/battery unit with a diesel-driven charging circuit. ALCO acquired the McIntosh & Seymour Engine Company in 1929 and entered series production of 300 hp (220 kW) and 600 hp (450 kW) single-cab switcher units in 1931. ALCO would be the pre-eminent builder of switch engines through the mid-1930s and would adapt the basic switcher design to produce versatile and highly successful, albeit relatively low powered, road locomotives.

GM, seeing the success of the custom streamliners, sought to expand the market for diesel power by producing standardized locomotives under their Electro-Motive Corporation. In 1936, EMC's new factory started production of switch engines. In 1937, the factory started producing their new E series streamlined passenger locomotives, which would be upgraded with more reliable purpose-built engines in 1938. Seeing the performance and reliability of the new 567 model engine in passenger locomotives, EMC was eager to demonstrate diesel's viability in freight service.

Following the successful 1939 tour of EMC's FT demonstrator freight locomotive set, the stage was set for dieselization of American railroads. In 1941, ALCO-GE introduced the RS-1 road-switcher that occupied its own market niche while EMD's F series locomotives were sought for mainline freight service. The US entry into World War II slowed conversion to diesel; the War Production Board put a halt to building new passenger equipment and gave naval uses priority for diesel engine production. During the petroleum crisis of 1942–43, coal-fired steam had the advantage of not using fuel that was in critically short supply. EMD was later allowed to increase the production of its FT locomotives and ALCO-GE was allowed to produce a limited number of DL-109 road locomotives, but most in the locomotive business were restricted to making switch engines and steam locomotives.

In the early postwar era, EMD dominated the market for mainline locomotives with their E and F series locomotives. ALCO-GE in the late 1940s produced switchers and road-switchers that were successful in the short-haul market. However, EMD launched their GP series road-switcher locomotives in 1949, which displaced all other locomotives in the freight market including their own F series locomotives. GE subsequently dissolved its partnership with ALCO and would emerge as EMD's main competitor in the early 1960s, eventually taking the top position in the locomotive market from EMD.

Early diesel–electric locomotives in the United States used direct current (DC) traction motors but alternating current (AC) motors came into widespread use in the 1990s, starting with the Electro-Motive SD70MAC in 1993 and followed by General Electric's AC4400CW in 1994 and AC6000CW in 1995.

=== Early diesel locomotives and railcars in Oceania ===
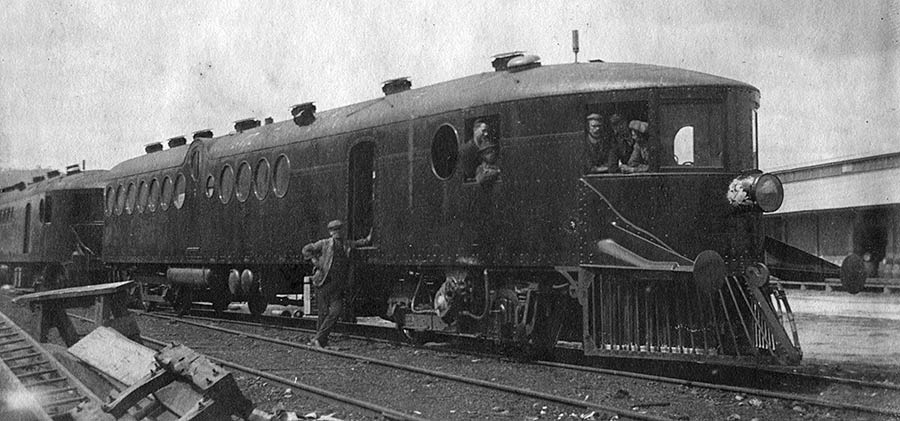
A McKeen railcar in Wodonga, Australia, 1911

The Trans-Australian Railway built 1912 to 1917 by Commonwealth Railways (CR) passes through 2,000 km of waterless (or salt watered) desert terrain unsuitable for steam locomotives. The original engineer Henry Deane envisaged diesel operation to overcome such problems. Some have suggested that the CR worked with the South Australian Railways to trial diesel traction. However, the technology was not developed enough to be reliable.

As in Europe, the usage of internal combustion engines advanced more readily in self-propelled railcars than in locomotives:

- Some Australian railway companies bought McKeen railmotors.
- In the 1920s and 1930s, more reliable Gasoline railmotors were built by Australian industries.
- Australia's first diesel railcars were the NSWGR 100 Class (PH later DP) Silver City Comet cars in 1937.
- High-speed vehicles for those days' possibilities on 3 ft 6 in (1,067 mm) were the ten Vulcan railcars of 1940 for New Zealand.

== Transmission types ==
=== Diesel–mechanical ===
Schematic illustration of a diesel–mechanical locomotive

A diesel–mechanical locomotive uses a mechanical transmission in a fashion similar to that employed in most road vehicles. This type of transmission is generally limited to low-powered, low-speed shunting (switching) locomotives, lightweight multiple units and self-propelled railcars.

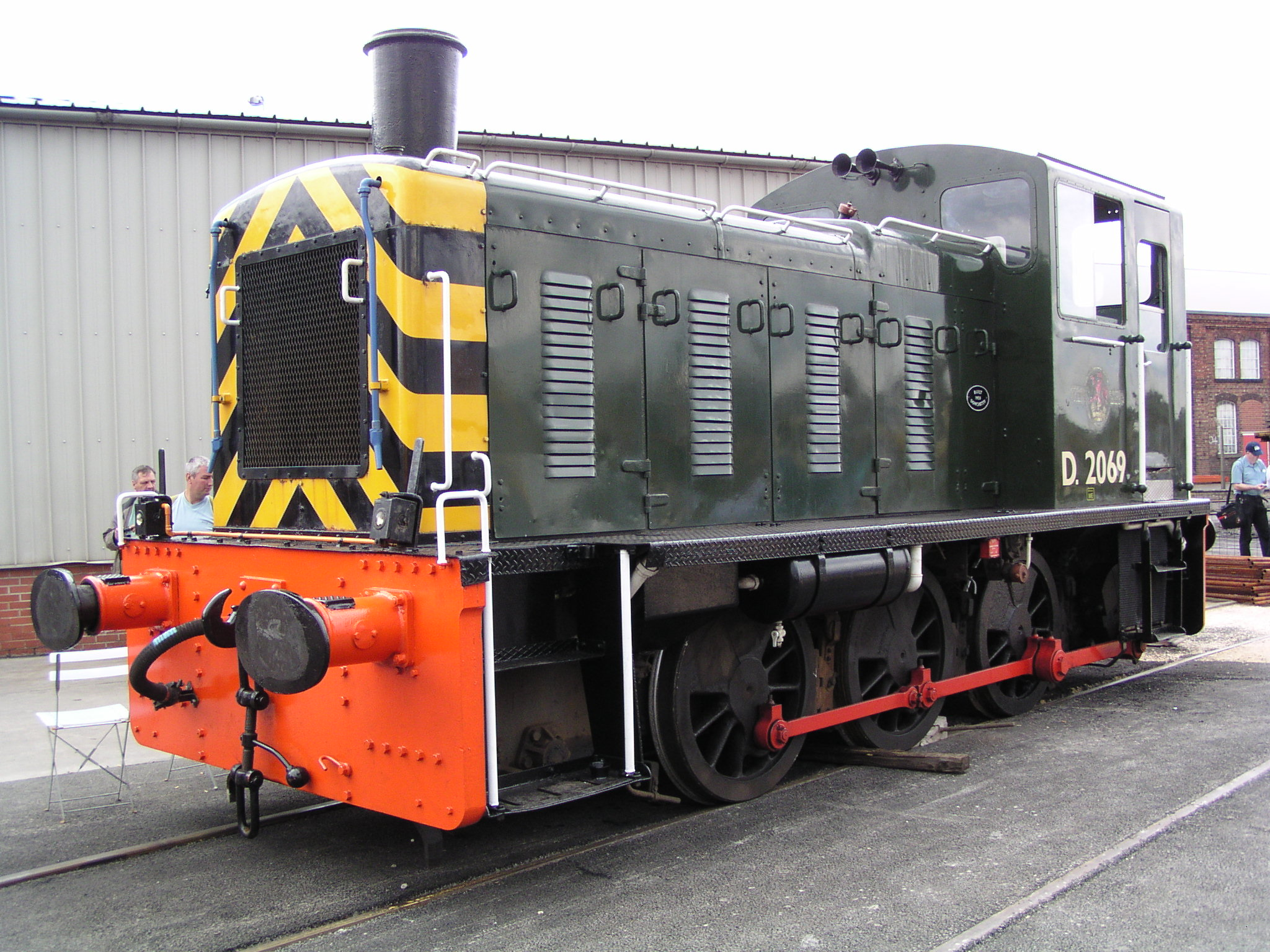
A British Rail Class 03 diesel–mechanical shunter with a jackshaft under the cab

The mechanical transmissions used for railroad propulsion are generally more complex and much more robust than standard-road versions. There is usually a fluid coupling interposed between the engine and gearbox, and the gearbox is often of the epicyclic (planetary) type to permit shifting while under load. Various systems have been devised to minimise the break in transmission during gear changing, such as the S.S.S. (synchro-self-shifting) gearbox used by Hudswell Clarke.

Diesel–mechanical propulsion is limited by the difficulty of building a reasonably sized transmission capable of coping with the power and torque required to move a heavy train. A number of attempts to use diesel–mechanical propulsion in high power applications have been made (for example, the 1,500 kW (2,000 hp) British Rail 10100 locomotive), though only few have proven successful (such as the 1,342 kW (1,800 hp) DSB Class MF).

=== Diesel–electric ===
Schematic diagram of a diesel–electric locomotive

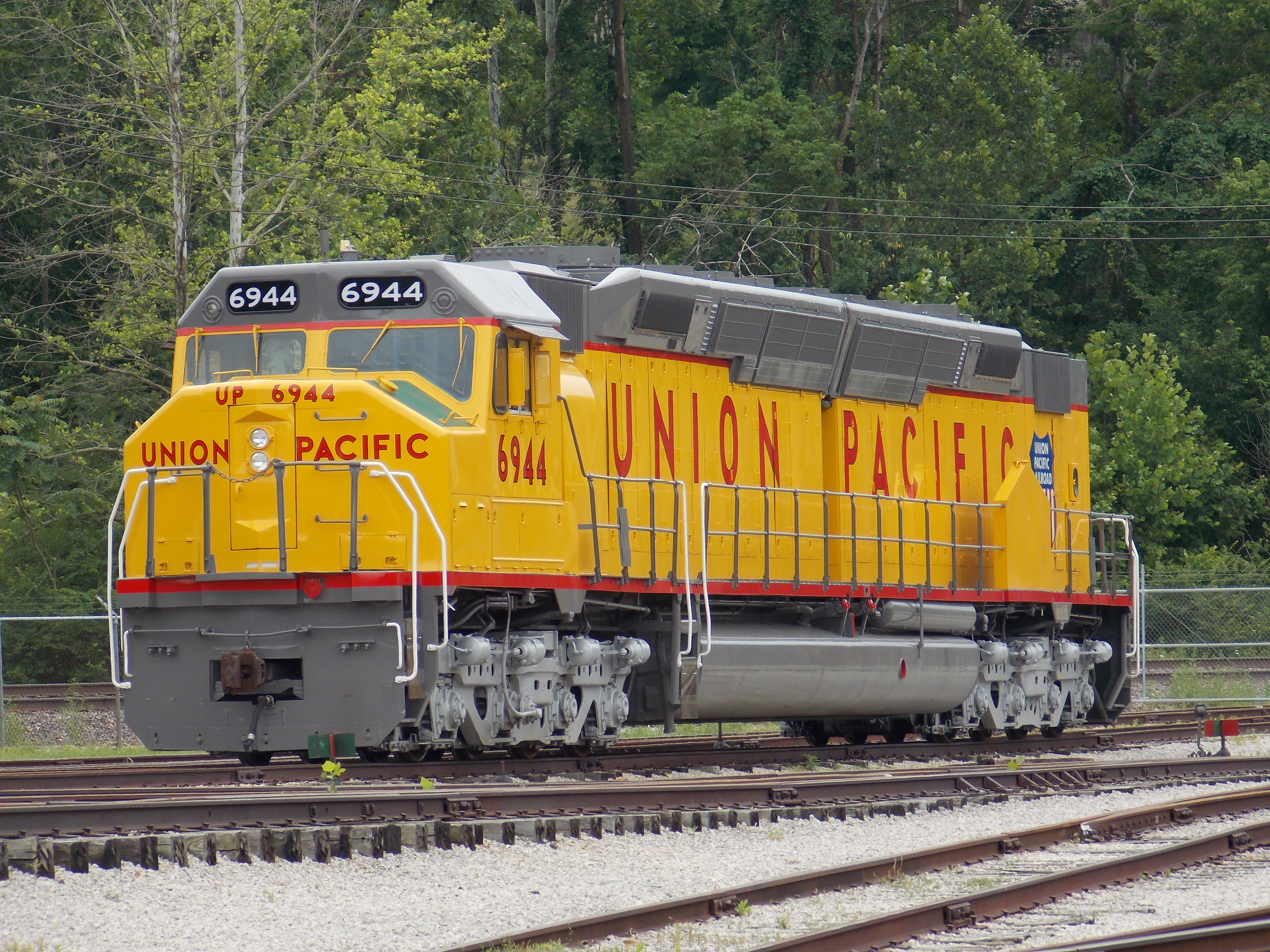
EMD DDA40X, the most powerful single-unit diesel–electric locomotive in the world with two diesel engines, rated at 6,600 hp (4,920 kW)

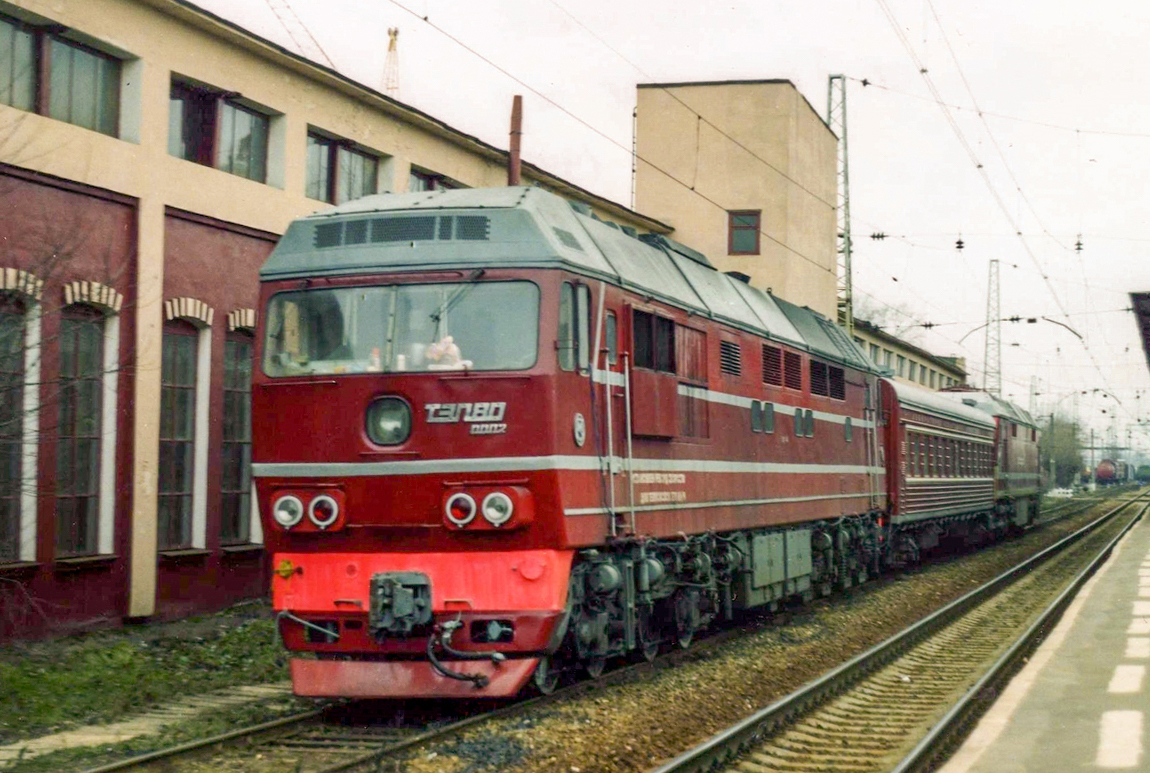
Russian diesel locomotive TEP80

In a diesel–electric locomotive, the diesel engine drives either an electrical DC generator (generally, less than 3,000 hp (2,200 kW) net for traction), or an electrical AC alternator-rectifier (generally 3,000 hp net or more for traction), the output of which provides power to the traction motors that drive the locomotive. There is no mechanical connection between the diesel engine and the wheels.

The important components of diesel–electric propulsion are the diesel engine (also known as the prime mover), the main generator/alternator-rectifier, traction motors (usually with four or six axles), and a control system consisting of the engine governor and electrical or electronic components, including switchgear, rectifiers and other components, which control or modify the electrical supply to the traction motors. In the most elementary case, the generator may be directly connected to the motors with only very simple switchgear.

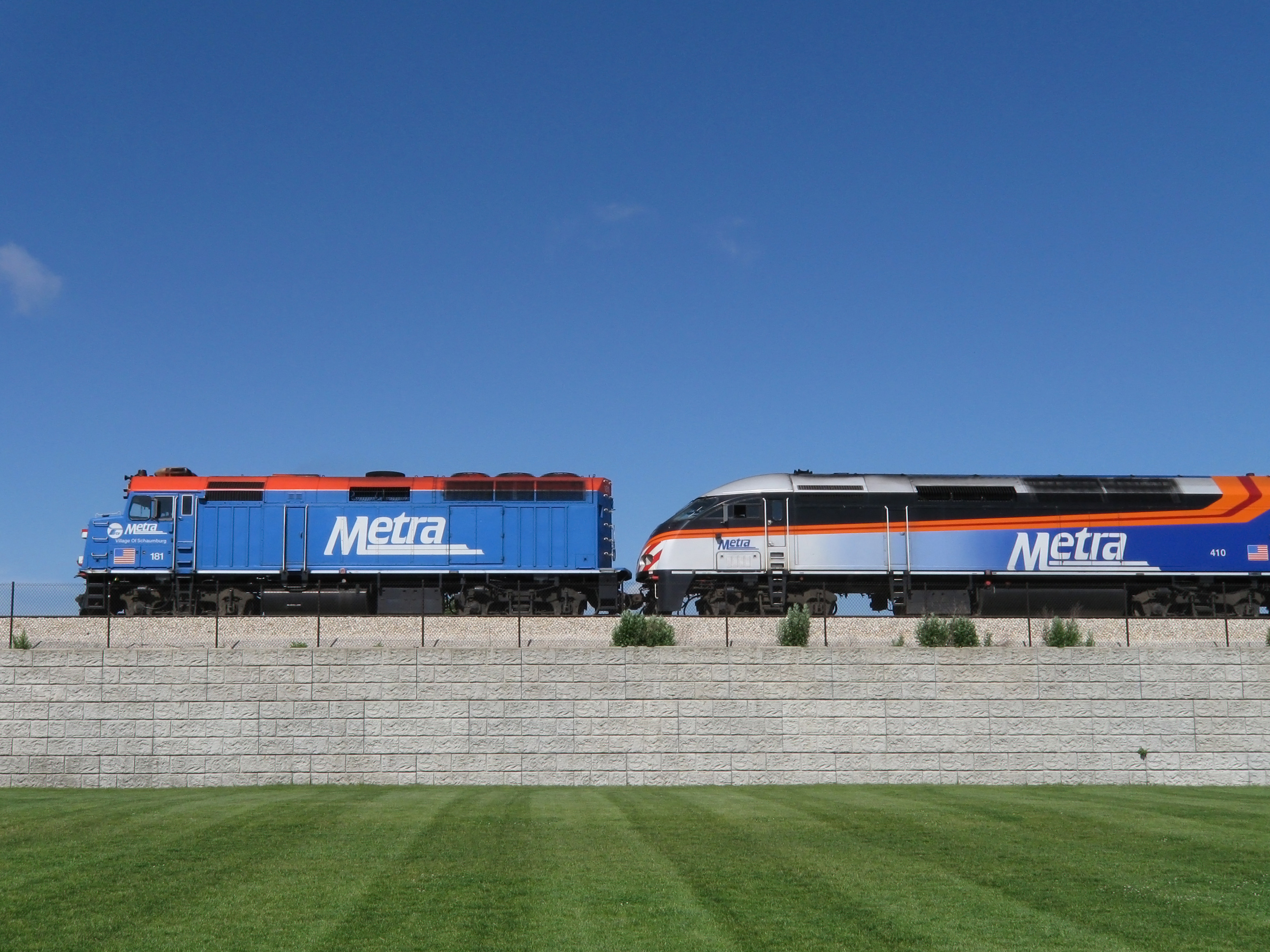
The EMD F40PH (left) and MPI MPXpress-series MP36PH-3S (right) locomotives coupled together by Metra use diesel–electric transmission.

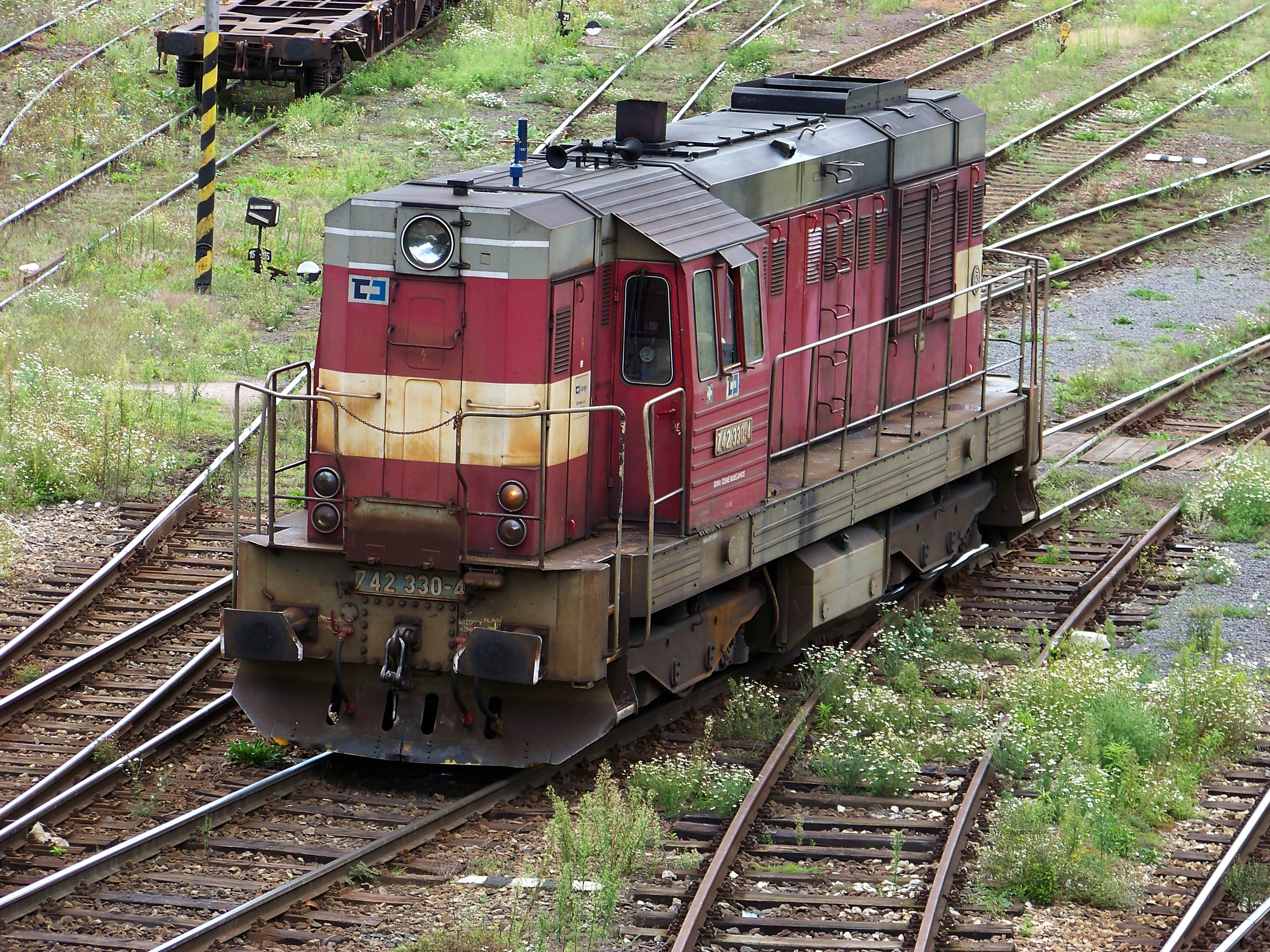
Czech Class 742 and 743 shunting locomotive

Originally, the traction motors and generator were DC machines. Following the development of high-capacity silicon rectifiers in the 1960s, the DC generator was replaced by an alternator using a diode bridge to convert its output to DC. This advance greatly improved locomotive reliability and decreased generator maintenance costs by elimination of the commutator and brushes in the generator. Elimination of the brushes and commutator, in turn, eliminated the possibility of a particularly destructive type of event referred to as a flashover (also known as an arc fault), which could result in immediate generator failure and, in some cases, start an engine room fire.

Current North American practice is for four axles for high-speed passenger or "time" freight, or for six axles for lower-speed or "manifest" freight. The most modern units on "time" freight service tend to have six axles underneath the frame. Unlike those in "manifest" service, "time" freight units will have only four of the axles connected to traction motors, with the other two as idler axles for weight distribution.

In the late 1980s, the development of high-power variable-voltage/variable-frequency (VVVF) drives, or "traction inverters", allowed the use of polyphase AC traction motors, thereby also eliminating the motor commutator and brushes. The result is a more efficient and reliable drive that requires relatively little maintenance and is better able to cope with overload conditions that often destroyed the older types of motors.

==== Diesel–electric control ====
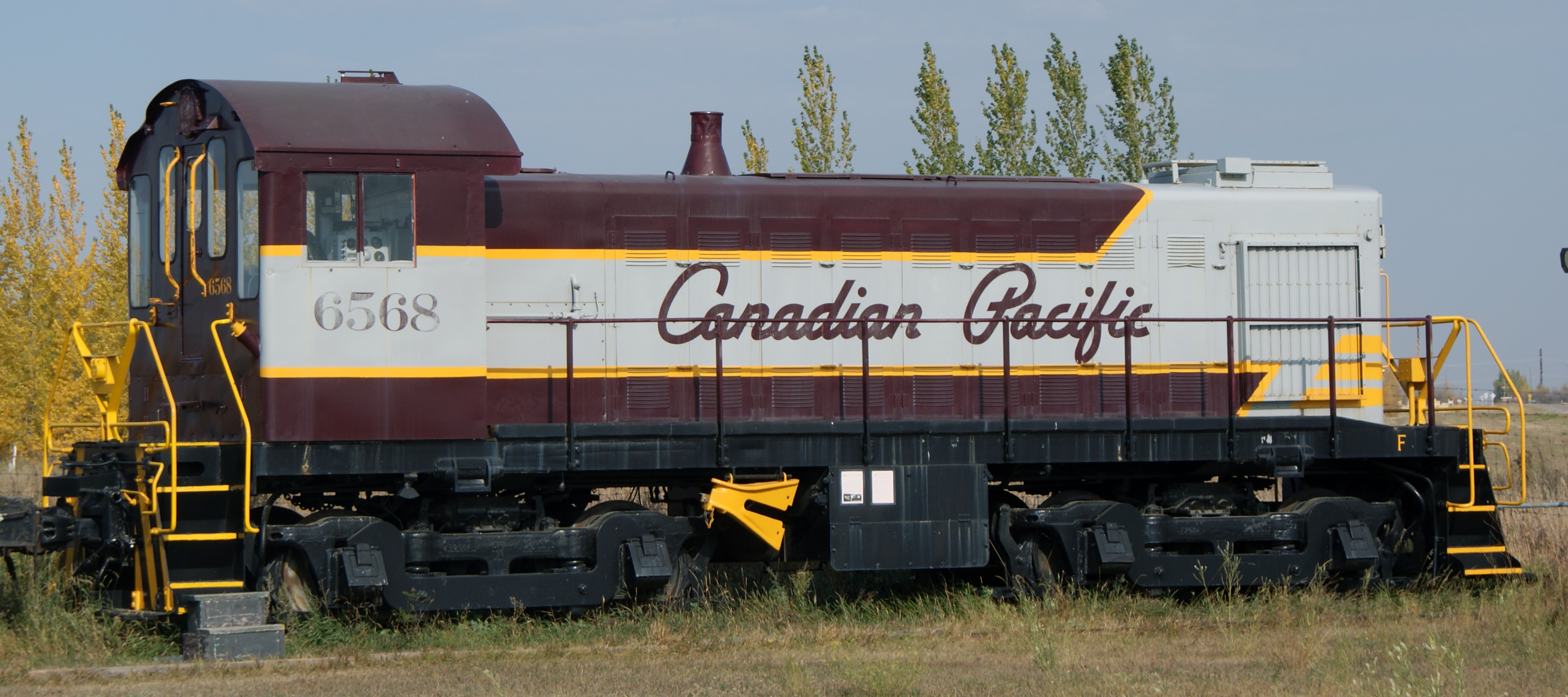
MLW model S-3 produced in 1957 for the CPR, adhering to designs by ALCO

A diesel–electric locomotive's power output is independent of road speed, as long as the unit's generator current and voltage limits are not exceeded. Therefore, the unit's ability to develop tractive effort (also referred to as drawbar pull or tractive force, which is what actually propels the train) will tend to inversely vary with speed within these limits. (See power curve below). Maintaining acceptable operating parameters was one of the principal design considerations that had to be solved in early diesel–electric locomotive development and, ultimately, led to the complex control systems in place on modern units.

==== Throttle operation ====
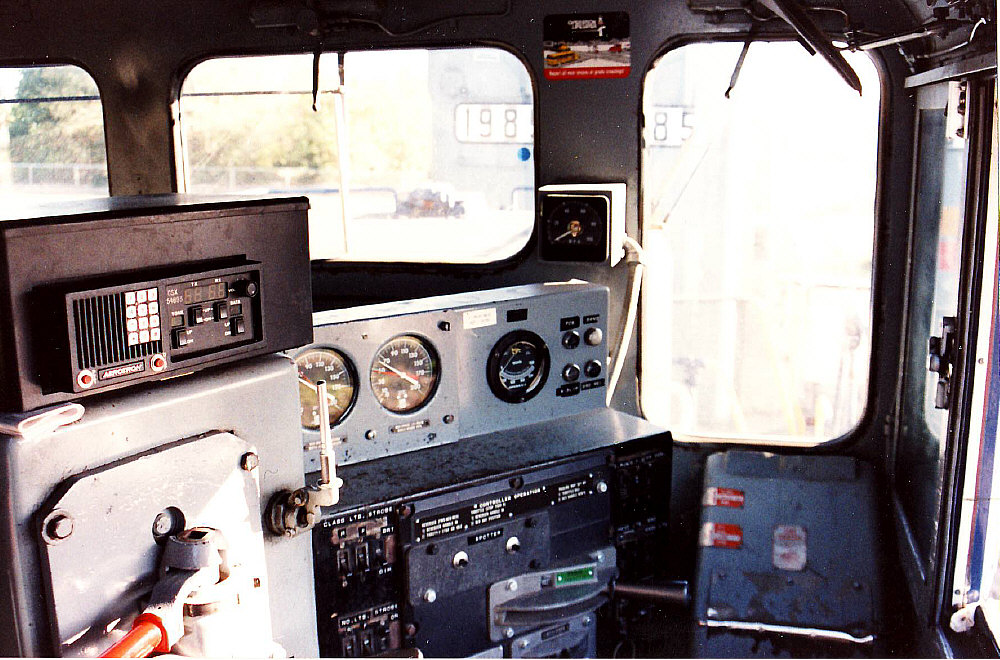
Engineer's controls in a hood-styled diesel–electric locomotive cab. The lever near bottom-centre is the throttle and the lever visible at bottom left is the automatic brake valve control.

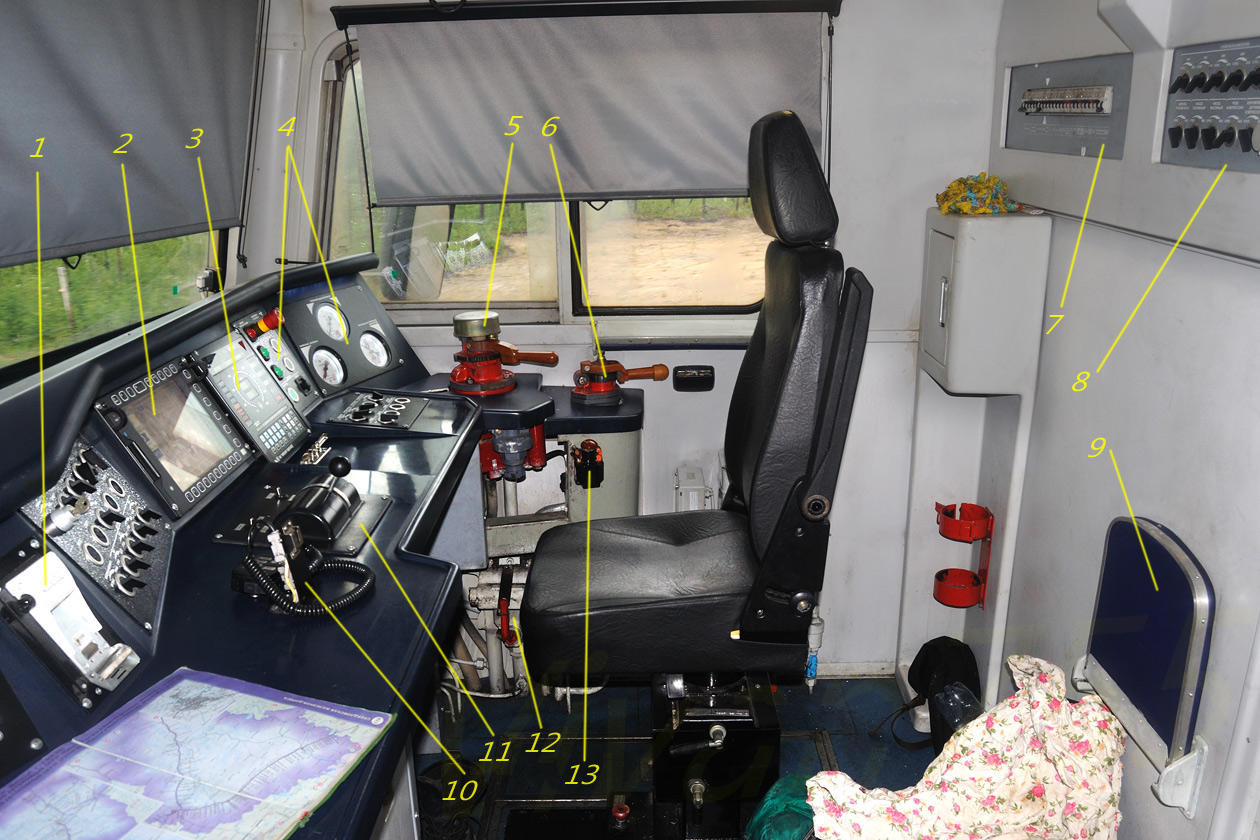
Cab of the boxcab-styled Russian locomotive 2TE116U. 11 indicates the throttle.

The prime mover's power output is primarily determined by its rotational speed (RPM) and fuel rate, which are regulated by a governor or similar mechanism. The governor is designed to react to both the throttle setting, as determined by the engine driver and the speed at which the prime mover is running (see Control theory).

Locomotive power output, and therefore speed, is typically controlled by the engine driver using a stepped or "notched" throttle that produces binary-like electrical signals corresponding to throttle position. This basic design lends itself well to multiple unit (MU) operation by producing discrete conditions that assure that all units in a consist respond in the same way to throttle position. Binary encoding also helps to minimize the number of trainlines (electrical connections) that are required to pass signals from unit to unit. For example, only four trainlines are required to encode all possible throttle positions if there are up to 14 stages of throttling.

North American locomotives, such as those built by EMD or General Electric, have eight throttle positions or "notches" as well as a "reverser" to allow them to operate bi-directionally. Many UK-built locomotives have a ten-position throttle. The power positions are often referred to by locomotive crews depending upon the throttle setting, such as "run 3" or "notch 3".

In older locomotives, the throttle mechanism was ratcheted so that it was not possible to advance more than one power position at a time. The engine driver could not, for example, pull the throttle from notch 2 to notch 4 without stopping at notch 3. This feature was intended to prevent rough train handling due to abrupt power increases caused by rapid throttle motion ("throttle stripping", an operating rules violation on many railroads). Modern locomotives no longer have this restriction, as their control systems are able to smoothly modulate power and avoid sudden changes in train loading regardless of how the engine driver operates the controls.

Overview of a driver's cab and an engine room of the Hungarian cab-styled M61 diesel–electric locomotive. Changes in diesel engine sounds can be heard as the throttle position is changed.

When the throttle is in the idle position, the prime mover receives minimal fuel, causing it to idle at low RPM. In addition, the traction motors are not connected to the main generator and the generator's field windings are not excited (energized) – the generator does not produce electricity without excitation. Therefore, the locomotive will be in "neutral". Conceptually, this is the same as placing an automobile's transmission into neutral while the engine is running.

To set the locomotive in motion, the reverser control handle is placed into the correct position (forward or reverse), the brake is released and the throttle is moved to the run 1 position (the first power notch). An experienced engine driver can accomplish these steps in a coordinated fashion that will result in a nearly imperceptible start. The positioning of the reverser and movement of the throttle together is conceptually like shifting an automobile's automatic transmission into gear while the engine is idling.

Placing the throttle into the first power position will cause the traction motors to be connected to the main generator and the latter's field coils to be excited. With excitation applied, the main generator will deliver electricity to the traction motors, resulting in motion. If the locomotive is running "light" (that is, not coupled to the rest of a train) and is not on an ascending grade, it will easily accelerate. On the other hand, if a long train is being started, the locomotive may stall as soon as some of the slack has been taken up, as the drag imposed by the train will exceed the tractive force being developed. An experienced engine driver will be able to recognize an incipient stall and will gradually advance the throttle as required to maintain the pace of acceleration.

As the throttle is moved to higher power notches, the fuel rate to the prime mover will increase, resulting in a corresponding increase in RPM and horsepower output. At the same time, main generator field excitation will be proportionally increased to absorb the higher power. This will translate into increased electrical output to the traction motors, with a corresponding increase in tractive force. Eventually, depending on the requirements of the train's schedule, the engine driver will have moved the throttle to the position of maximum power and will maintain it there until the train has accelerated to the desired speed.

EMD and GE mainline diesel–electric locomotives of the US in operation with freight trains. Sounds of diesel engines during idle and power-up.

The propulsion system is designed to produce maximum traction motor torque at start-up, which explains why modern locomotives are capable of starting trains weighing in excess of 15,000 tons, even on ascending grades. Current technology allows a locomotive to develop as much as 30% of its loaded driver weight in tractive force, amounting to 120,000 pounds-force (530 kN) of tractive force for a large, six-axle freight (goods) unit. In fact, a consist of such units can produce more than enough drawbar pull at start-up to damage or derail cars (if on a curve) or break couplers (the latter being referred to in North American railroad slang as "jerking a lung"). Therefore, it is incumbent upon the engine driver to carefully monitor the amount of power being applied at start-up to avoid damage. In particular, "jerking a lung" could be a calamitous matter if it were to occur on an ascending grade, except that the safety inherent in the correct operation of fail-safe automatic train brakes installed in wagons today prevents runaway trains by automatically applying the wagon brakes when train line air pressure drops.

==== Propulsion system operation ====
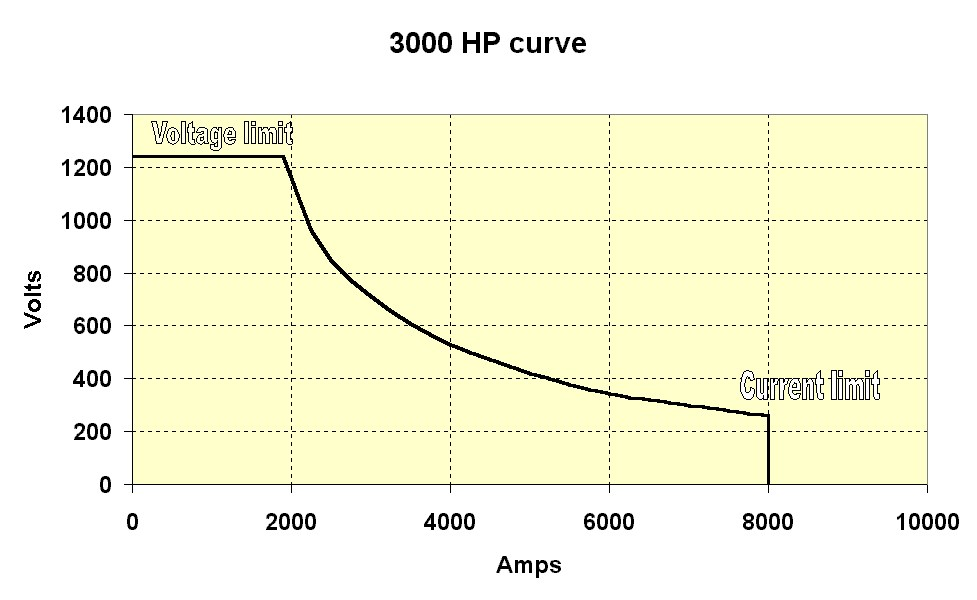
Typical main generator constant-power curve at "notch 8"

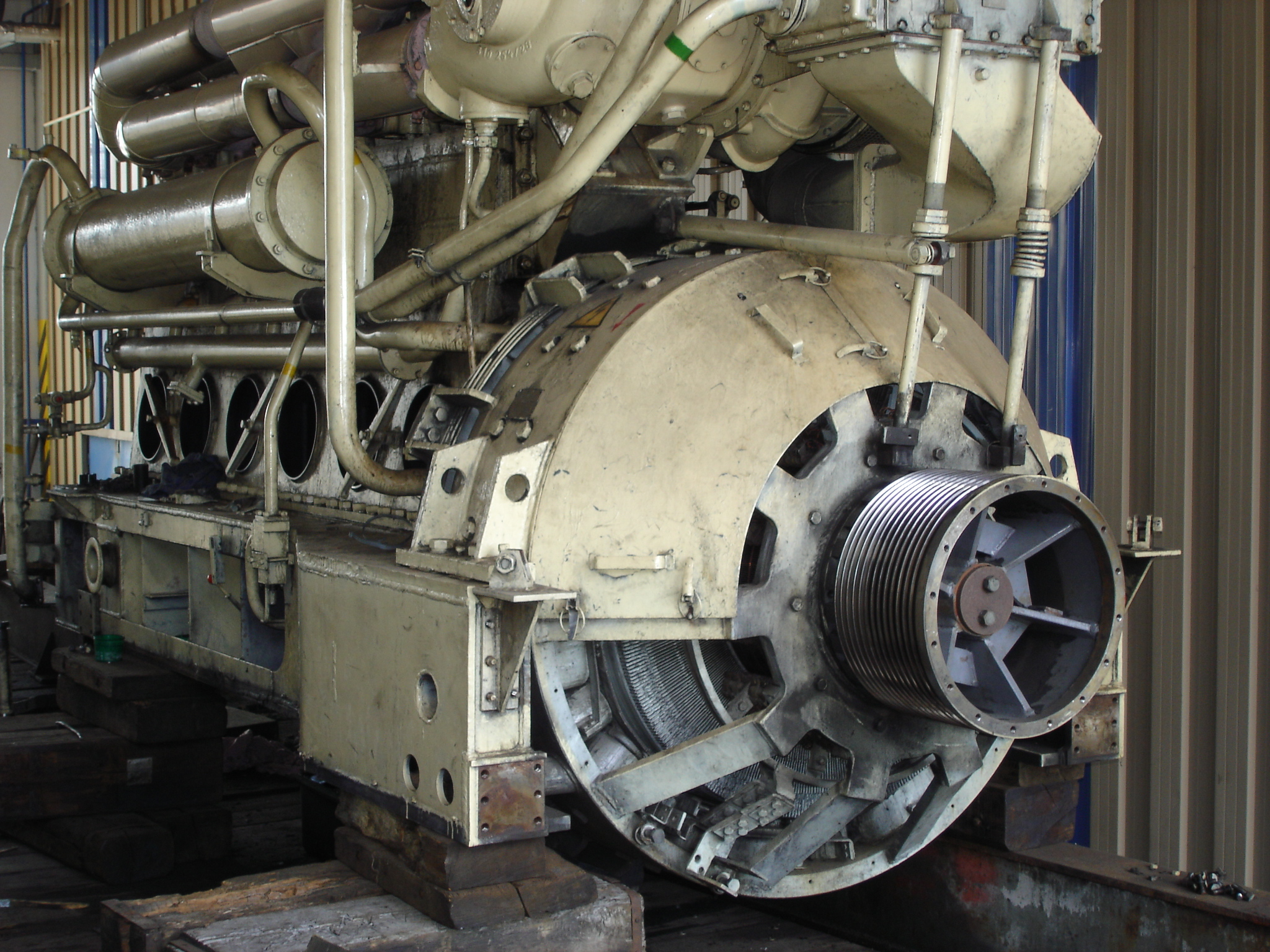
Diesel engine and main DC generator of a Czech Class 751 locomotive

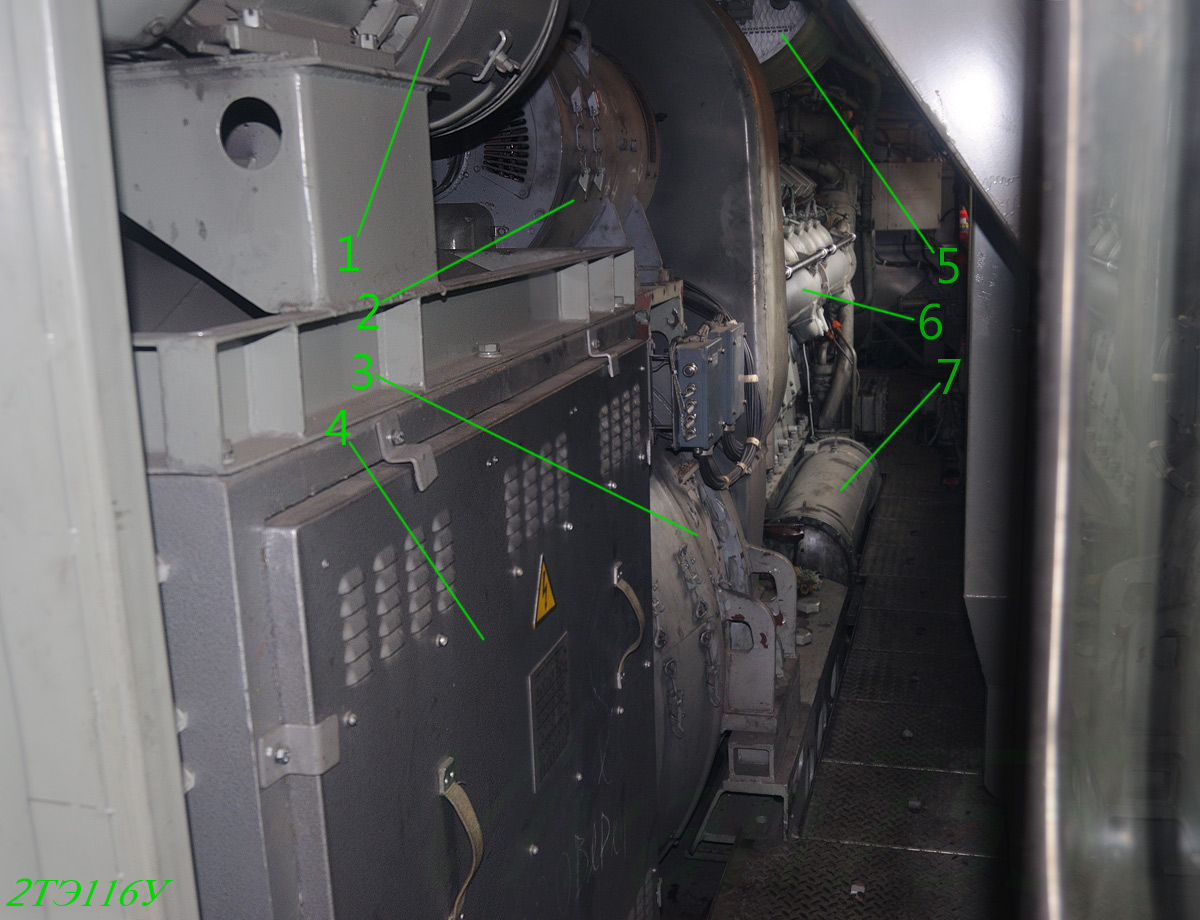
Left corridor of power compartment of Russian locomotive 2TE116U, 3 – alternator, 4 – rectifier, 6 – diesel

Soviet 2TE116 diesel–electric locomotive in motion with a freight train. Sounds of diesel engines at full power.

A locomotive's control system is designed so that the main generator electrical power output is matched to any given engine speed. Given the innate characteristics of traction motors, as well as the way in which the motors are connected to the main generator, the generator will produce high current and low voltage at low locomotive speeds, gradually changing to low current and high voltage as the locomotive accelerates. Therefore, the net power produced by the locomotive will remain constant for any given throttle setting (see power curve graph for notch 8).

In older designs, the engine's governor and a companion device, the load regulator, play a central role in the control system. The governor has two external inputs: requested engine speed, determined by the engine driver's throttle setting, and actual engine speed (feedback). The governor has two external control outputs: fuel injector setting, which determines the engine fuel rate, and current regulator position, which affects main generator excitation. The governor also incorporates a separate overspeed protective mechanism that will immediately cut off the fuel supply to the injectors and sound an alarm in the cab in the event the engine exceeds a defined RPM. Not all of these inputs and outputs are necessarily electrical.

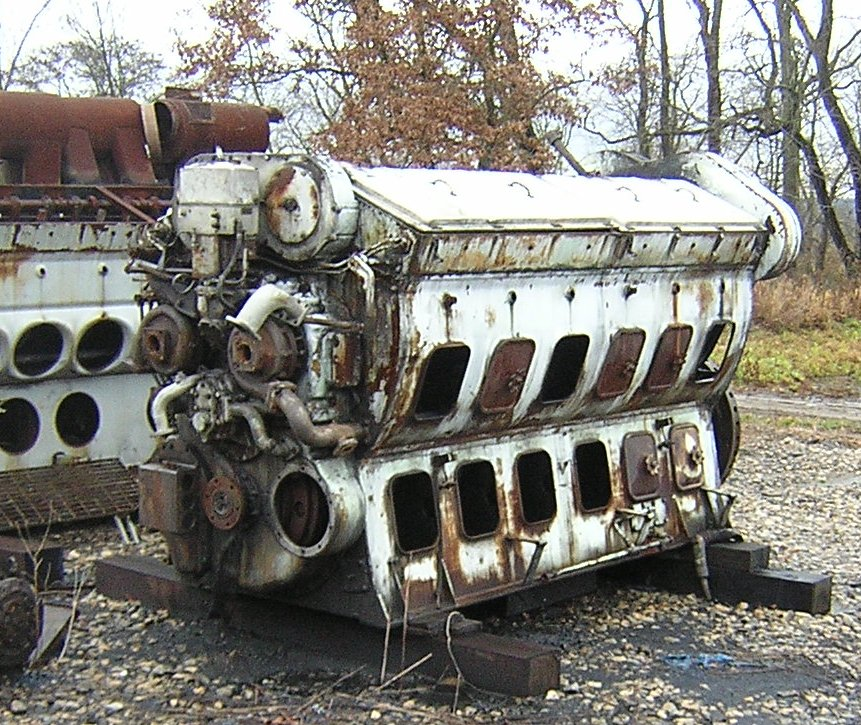
An EMD 12-567B 12-cylinder two-stroke diesel engine (foreground; square hand holes), stored pending rebuild, and missing some components, with a 16-567C or D 16-cylinder engine (background; round hand holes)

As the load on the engine changes, its rotational speed will also change. This is detected by the governor through a change in the engine speed feedback signal. The net effect is to adjust both the fuel rate and the load regulator position so that engine RPM and torque (and therefore power output) will remain constant for any given throttle setting, regardless of actual road speed.

In newer designs controlled by a "traction computer," each engine speed step is allotted an appropriate power output, or "kW reference", in software. The computer compares this value with actual main generator power output, or "kW feedback", calculated from traction motor current and main generator voltage feedback values. The computer adjusts the feedback value to match the reference value by controlling the excitation of the main generator, as described above. The governor still has control of engine speed, but the load regulator no longer plays a central role in this type of control system. However, the load regulator is retained as a "back-up" in case of engine overload. Modern locomotives fitted with electronic fuel injection (EFI) may have no mechanical governor; however, a "virtual" load regulator and governor are retained with computer modules.

Traction motor performance is controlled either by varying the DC voltage output of the main generator, for DC motors, or by varying the frequency and voltage output of the variable voltage variable frequency drive (VVVF drive) for the AC motors. With DC motors, various connection combinations are utilized to adapt the drive to varying operating conditions.

At standstill, main generator output is initially low voltage/high current, often in excess of 1000 amperes per motor at full power. When the locomotive is at or near standstill, current flow will be limited only by the DC resistance of the motor windings and interconnecting circuitry, as well as the capacity of the main generator itself. Torque in a series-wound motor is approximately proportional to the square of the current. Hence, the traction motors will produce their highest torque, causing the locomotive to develop maximum tractive effort, enabling it to overcome the inertia of the train. This effect is analogous to what happens in an automobile automatic transmission at start-up, where it is in first gear and thereby producing maximum torque multiplication.

As the locomotive accelerates, the now-rotating motor armatures will start to generate a counter-electromotive force (back EMF, meaning the motors are also trying to act as generators), which will oppose the output of the main generator and cause traction motor current to decrease. Main generator voltage will correspondingly increase in an attempt to maintain motor power but will eventually reach a plateau. At this point, the locomotive will essentially cease to accelerate, unless on a downgrade. Since this plateau will usually be reached at a speed substantially less than the maximum that may be desired, something must be done to change the drive characteristics to allow continued acceleration. This change is referred to as "transition", a process that is analogous to shifting gears in an automobile.

Transition methods include:

- Series / Parallel or "motor transition".
  - Initially, pairs of motors are connected in series across the main generator. At higher speed, motors are reconnected in parallel across the main generator.
- "Field shunting", "field diverting", or "weak fielding".
  - Resistance is connected in parallel with the motor field. This has the effect of increasing the armature current, producing a corresponding increase in motor torque and speed.

Both methods may also be combined, to increase the operating speed range.

- Generator / rectifier transition
  - Reconnecting the two separate internal main generator stator windings of two rectifiers from parallel to series to increase the output voltage.

In older locomotives, it was necessary for the engine driver to manually execute transition by use of a separate control. As an aid to performing transition at the right time, the load meter (an indicator that shows the engine driver how much current is being drawn by the traction motors) was calibrated to indicate at which points forward or backward transition should take place. Automatic transition was subsequently developed to produce better-operating efficiency and to protect the main generator and traction motors from overloading from improper transition.

Modern locomotives incorporate traction inverters, AC to DC, capable of delivering 1,200 volts (earlier traction generators, DC to DC, were capable of delivering only 600 volts). This improvement was accomplished largely through improvements in silicon diode technology. With the capability of delivering 1,200 volts to the traction motors, the need for "transition" was eliminated.

==== Dynamic braking ====
A common option on diesel–electric locomotives is dynamic (rheostatic) braking.

Dynamic braking takes advantage of the fact that the traction motor armatures are always rotating when the locomotive is in motion and that a motor can be made to act as a generator by separately exciting the field winding. When dynamic braking is used, the traction control circuits are configured as follows:

- The field winding of each traction motor is connected across the main generator.
- The armature of each traction motor is connected across a forced-air-cooled resistance grid (the dynamic braking grid) in the roof of the locomotive's hood.
- The prime mover rotational speed is increased, and the main generator field is excited, causing a corresponding excitation of the traction motor fields.

The aggregate effect of the above is to cause each traction motor to generate electric power and dissipate it as heat in the dynamic braking grid. A fan connected across the grid provides forced-air cooling. Consequently, the fan is powered by the output of the traction motors and will tend to run faster and produce more airflow as more energy is applied to the grid.

Ultimately, the source of the energy dissipated in the dynamic braking grid is the motion of the locomotive as imparted to the traction motor armatures. Therefore, the traction motors impose drag and the locomotive acts as a brake. As speed decreases, the braking effect decays and usually becomes ineffective below approximately 16 km/h (10 mph), depending on the gear ratio between the traction motors and axles.

Dynamic braking is particularly beneficial when operating in mountainous regions, where there is always the danger of a runaway due to overheated friction brakes during descent. In such cases, dynamic brakes are usually applied in conjunction with the air brakes, the combined effect being referred to as blended braking. The use of blended braking can also assist in keeping the slack in a long train stretched as it crests a grade, helping to prevent a "run-in", an abrupt bunching of train slack that can cause a derailment. Blended braking is also commonly used with commuter trains to reduce wear and tear on the mechanical brakes that is a natural result of the numerous stops such trains typically make during a run.

==== Electro-diesel ====
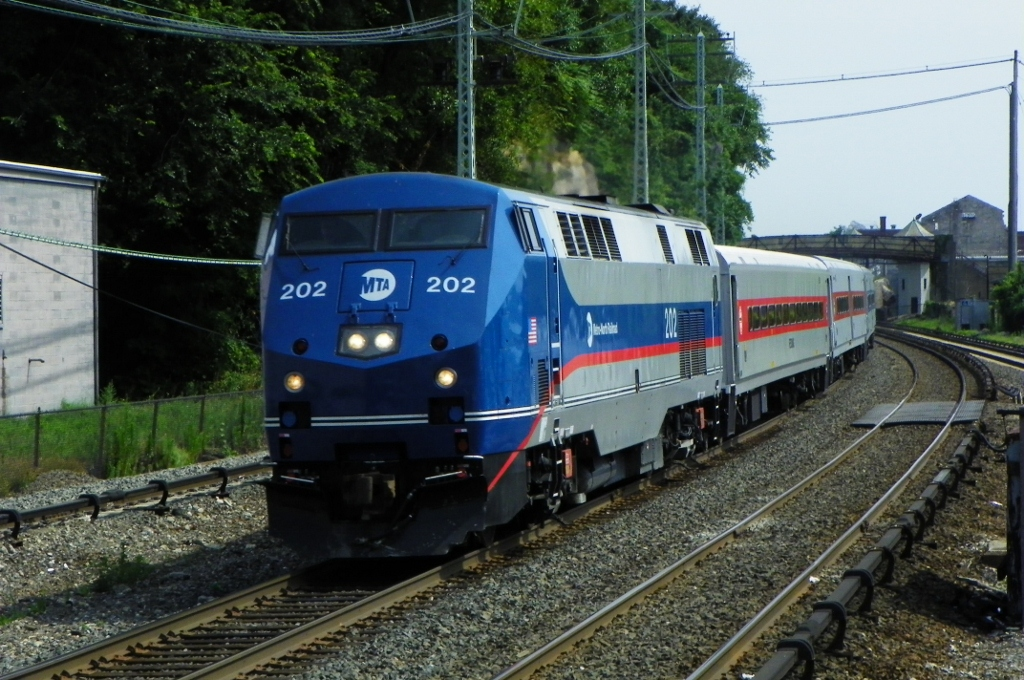
Metro-North's GE Genesis P32AC-DM electro-diesel locomotive can also operate off of third-rail electrification.

These special locomotives can operate as an electric locomotive or as a diesel locomotive. The Long Island Rail Road, Metro-North Railroad and New Jersey Transit Rail Operations operate dual-mode diesel–electric/third-rail (catenary on NJTransit) locomotives between non-electrified territory and New York City because of a local law banning diesel-powered locomotives in Manhattan tunnels. For the same reason, Amtrak operates a fleet of dual-mode locomotives in the New York area. British Rail operated dual diesel–electric/electric locomotives designed to run primarily as electric locomotives with reduced power available when running on diesel power. This allowed railway yards to remain unelectrified, as the third rail power system is extremely hazardous in a yard area.

=== Diesel–hydraulic ===
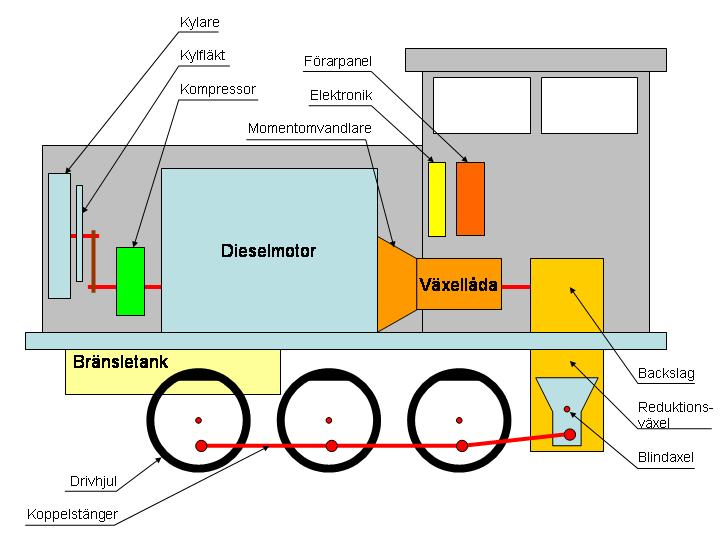
Schematic diagram of a diesel–hydraulic shunting locomotive with hydromechanical transmission

Diesel–hydraulic locomotives use one or more torque converters, in combination with fixed ratio gears. Drive shafts and gears form the final drive to convey the power from the torque converters to the wheels, and to effect reverse. The difference between hydraulic and mechanical systems is where the speed and torque is adjusted. In the mechanical transmission system that has multiple ratios such as in a gear box, if there is a hydraulic section, it is only to allow the engine to run when the train is too slow or stopped. In the hydraulic system, hydraulics are the primary system for adapting engine speed and torque to the train's situation, with gear selection for only limited use, such as reverse gear.

==== Hydrostatic transmission ====
Hydrostatic drive systems have been applied to rail use. Modern examples included 350 to 750 hp (260 to 560 kW) shunting locomotives by Cockerill (Belgium), 4 to 12 tonne 35 to 58 kW (47 to 78 hp) narrow gauge industrial locomotives by Atlas Copco subsidiary GIA. Hydrostatic drives are also utilised in railway maintenance machines (tampers, rail grinders).

Application of hydrostatic transmissions is generally limited to small shunting locomotives and rail maintenance equipment, as well as being used for non-tractive applications in diesel engines such as drives for traction motor fans.

==== Hydrokinetic transmission ====
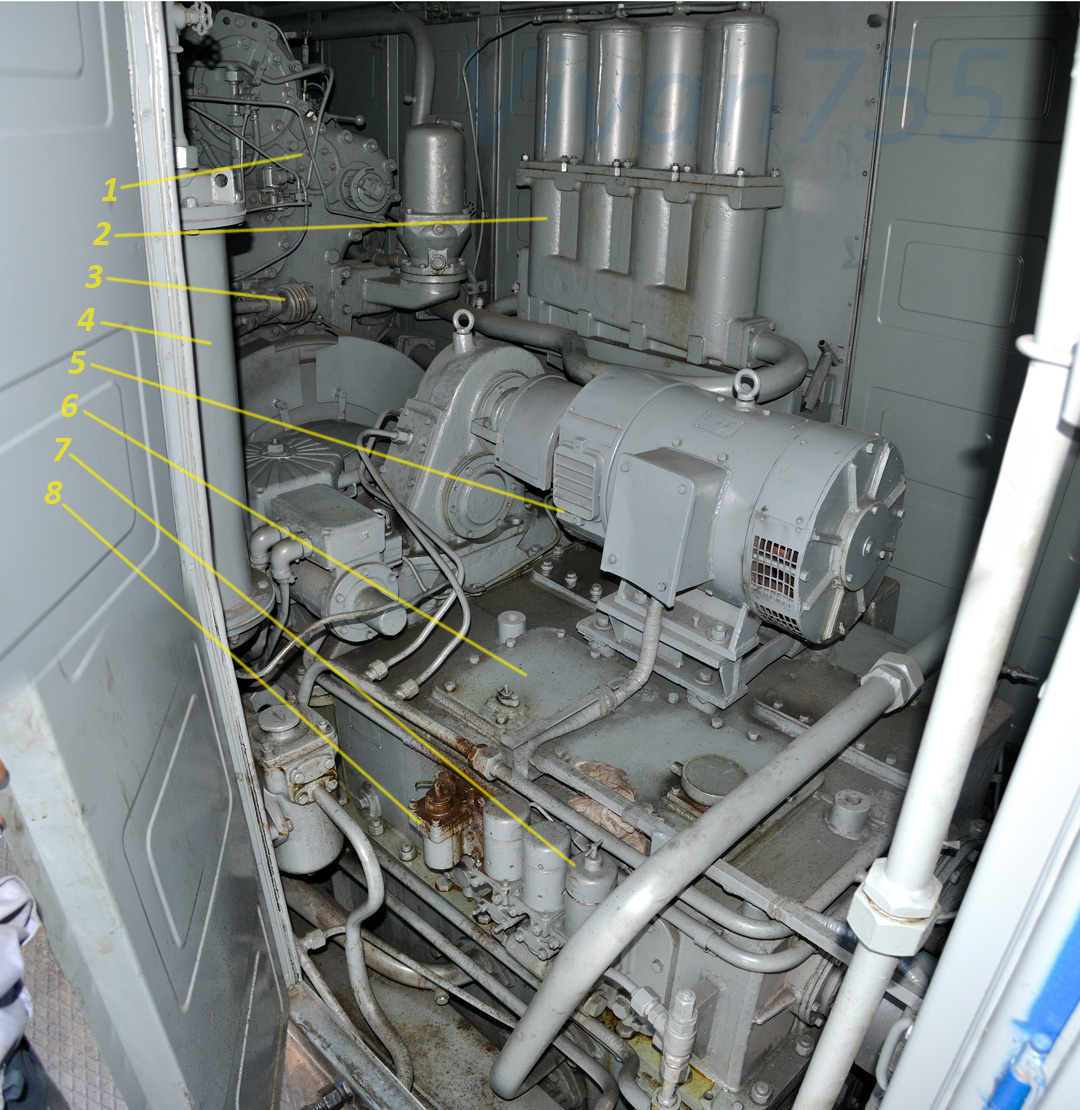
An equipment of a Russian TGM6 diesel–hydraulic locomotive: 1 — diesel, 2 — oil filter, 3 — turning gear, 4 — water-to-fuel heater, 5 — auxiliary electric generator, 6 — hydrokinetic transmission, 7 — first gear valve (with manual shift handle), 8 — automatic transmission oil filter

Hydrokinetic transmission (also called hydrodynamic transmission) uses a torque converter. A torque converter consists of three main parts, two of which rotate, and one (the stator) that has a lock preventing backwards rotation and adding output torque by redirecting the oil flow at low output rotational speeds. All three main parts are sealed in an oil-filled housing. To match engine speed to load speed over the entire speed range of a locomotive, some additional method is required to give sufficient range. One method is to follow the torque converter with a mechanical gearbox which switches ratios automatically, similar to an automatic transmission in an automobile. Another method is to provide several torque converters each with a range of variability covering part of the total required; all the torque converters are mechanically connected all the time, and the appropriate one for the speed range required is selected by filling it with oil and draining the others. The filling and draining is carried out with the transmission under load, and results in very smooth range changes with no break in the transmitted power.

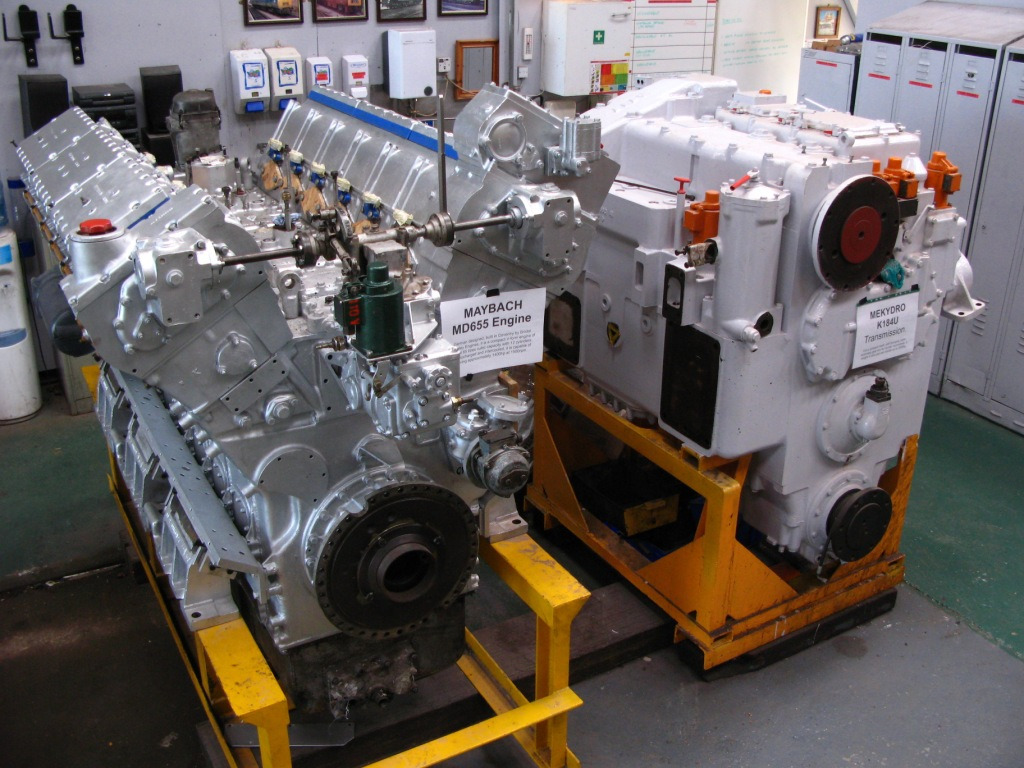
Diesel prime mover (left) and hydraulic transmission (right) of the British Rail Class 52 diesel locomotive

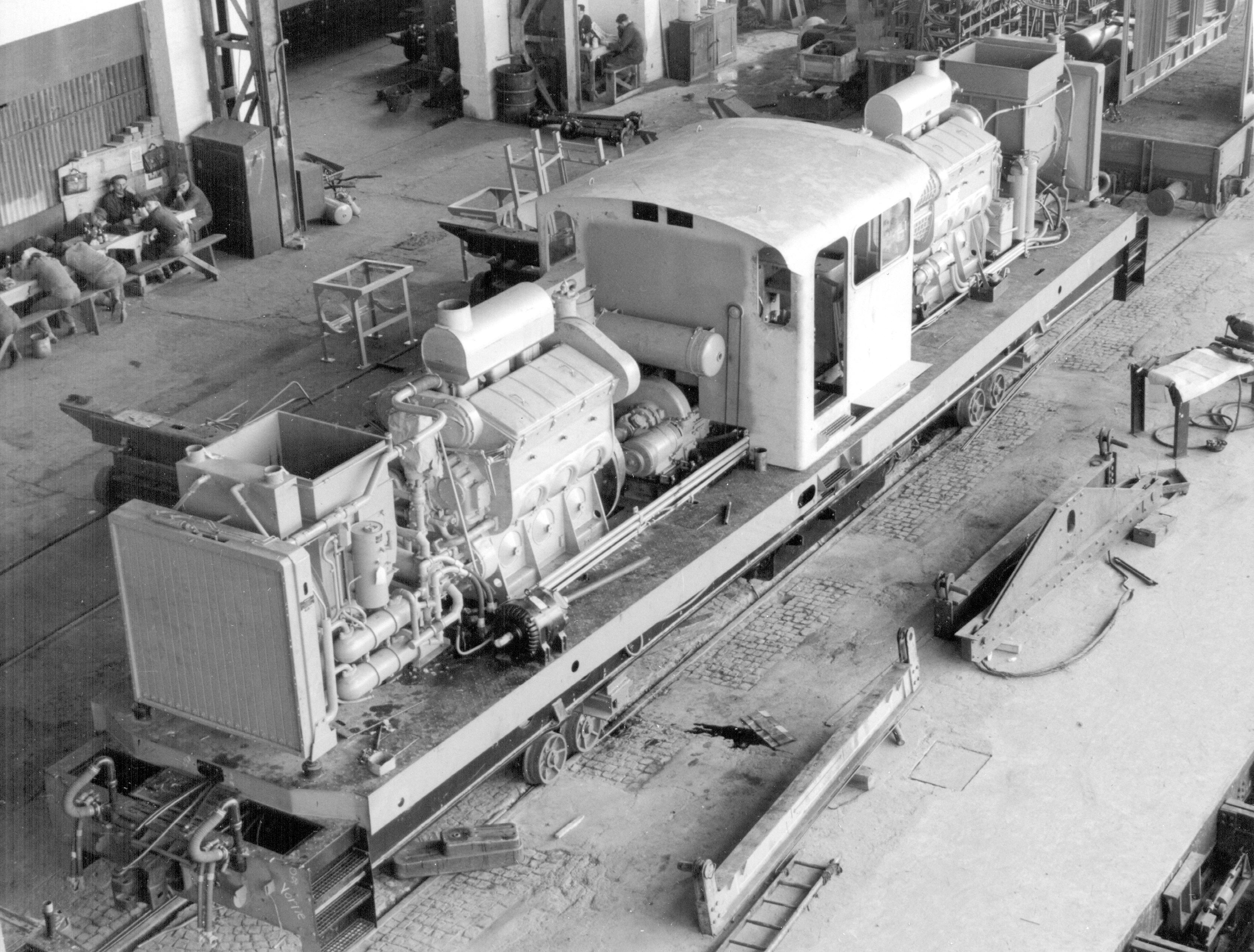
South African Class 61-000 diesel–hydraulic locomotive under construction

==== Locomotives ====
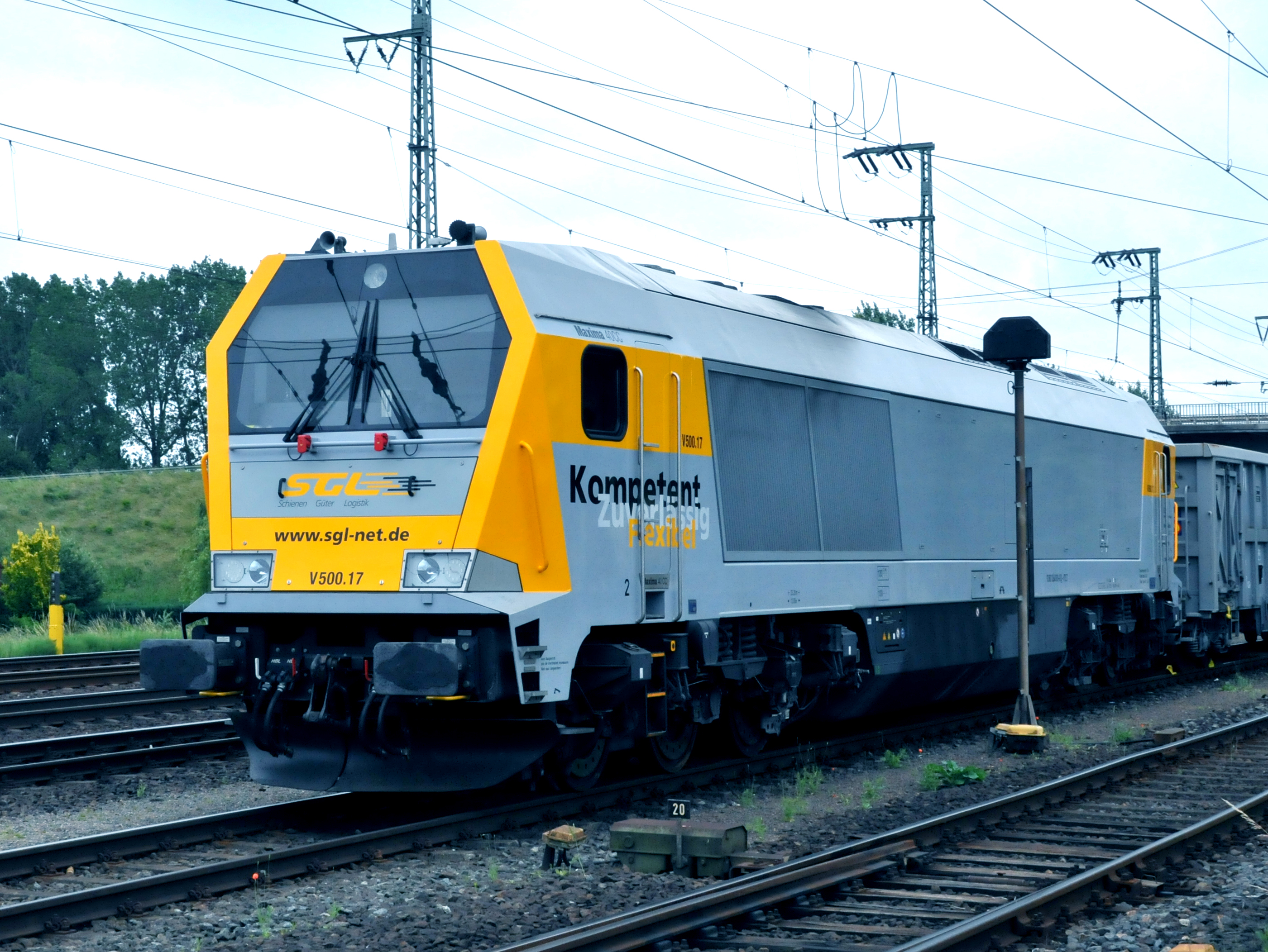
Voith Maxima 40CC, the most powerful single-engined diesel–hydraulic locomotive in the world, rated at 3,600 kW (4,800 hp)

Whilst diesel–electric (DE) locomotives were chosen around most of the world, a few countries turned toward Diesel Hydraulic (DH) locomotives instead, most notably Germany, Finland & Japan, as well as Britain for a time.

The reasons for this were multiple, two of the more notable being that whilst most DH locomotives achieved about the same drivetrain efficiency as DEs of around ~85% (with some early British designs being the exception), they could at the same time be built noticeably lighter for the same total power output. This was the case as the hydraulic transmissions didn't weigh nearly as much as the combination of generator(s) & multiple electric traction motors necessary on a DE.

The second notable advantage with DH locomotives, which lasted up until the introduction of modern traction control systems, was increased adhesion/traction per unit of weight. Normally on a DE locomotive every powered axle on a bogey features its own separate traction motor with no linkage between axles, and as such there is the potential that if one wheel loses grip and slips, this will cause the axle to spin faster independently from the others, resulting in a significant loss of overall traction. By contrast on a DH locomotive all the axles on each bogey are linked together via coupled drive shafts, and as such no single axle can begin to spin faster on its own should its wheels hit a slippery spot, greatly helping with traction. Prior to the introduction of effective traction control systems this technical difference alone could contribute anywhere between a 15–33% increase to the factor of adhesion for a diesel–hydraulic versus a diesel–electric locomotive.

These two advantages were some of the main reasons why in the 1960s three major US railroad companies, incl. Southern Pacific, initially expressed great interest in diesel hydraulic locomotive designs, eventually leading to the order and purchase of several West German ML4000 DH locomotives built specifically for the US by the firm Krauss Maffei. Reliability problems with these machines during high altitude operations with SP in the US, as well as the advent of domestic diesel engines of similar power levels coupled with an industry better suited for supporting diesel electric powertrains, however, meant that eventually interest in diesel hydraulics faded away in the US.

In Germany and Finland however, diesel–hydraulic systems achieved a very high reliability in operation, similar to or even better than DEs, which when coupled with the DHs aforementioned technical advantages helped make it the more popular type of diesel locomotive in these countries for a long time. Meanwhile, in the UK the diesel–hydraulic principle gained a more mixed reputation.

By the 21st century, for diesel locomotive traction worldwide the majority of countries used diesel–electric designs, with diesel–hydraulic designs not found in use outside Germany, Finland and Japan, and some neighbouring states, where it is used in designs for freight work.

Diesel–hydraulic locomotives have a smaller market share than diesel electrics – the main worldwide user of main-line hydraulic transmissions has been the Federal Republic of Germany, with designs including the 1950s DB class V 200, and the 1960 and 1970s DB Class V 160 family. British Rail introduced a number of diesel–hydraulic designs during its 1955 Modernisation Plan, initially license-built versions of German designs (see Category:Diesel–hydraulic locomotives of Great Britain). In Spain, Renfe used high power to weight ratio twin-engine German designs to haul high speed trains from the 1960s to 1990s. (See Renfe Classes 340, 350, 352, 353, 354)

Other main-line locomotives of the post-war period included the 1950s GMD GMDH-1 experimental locomotives; the Henschel & Son built South African Class 61-000; in the 1960s Southern Pacific bought 18 Krauss-Maffei KM ML-4000 diesel–hydraulic locomotives. The Denver & Rio Grande Western Railroad also bought three, all of which were later sold to SP.

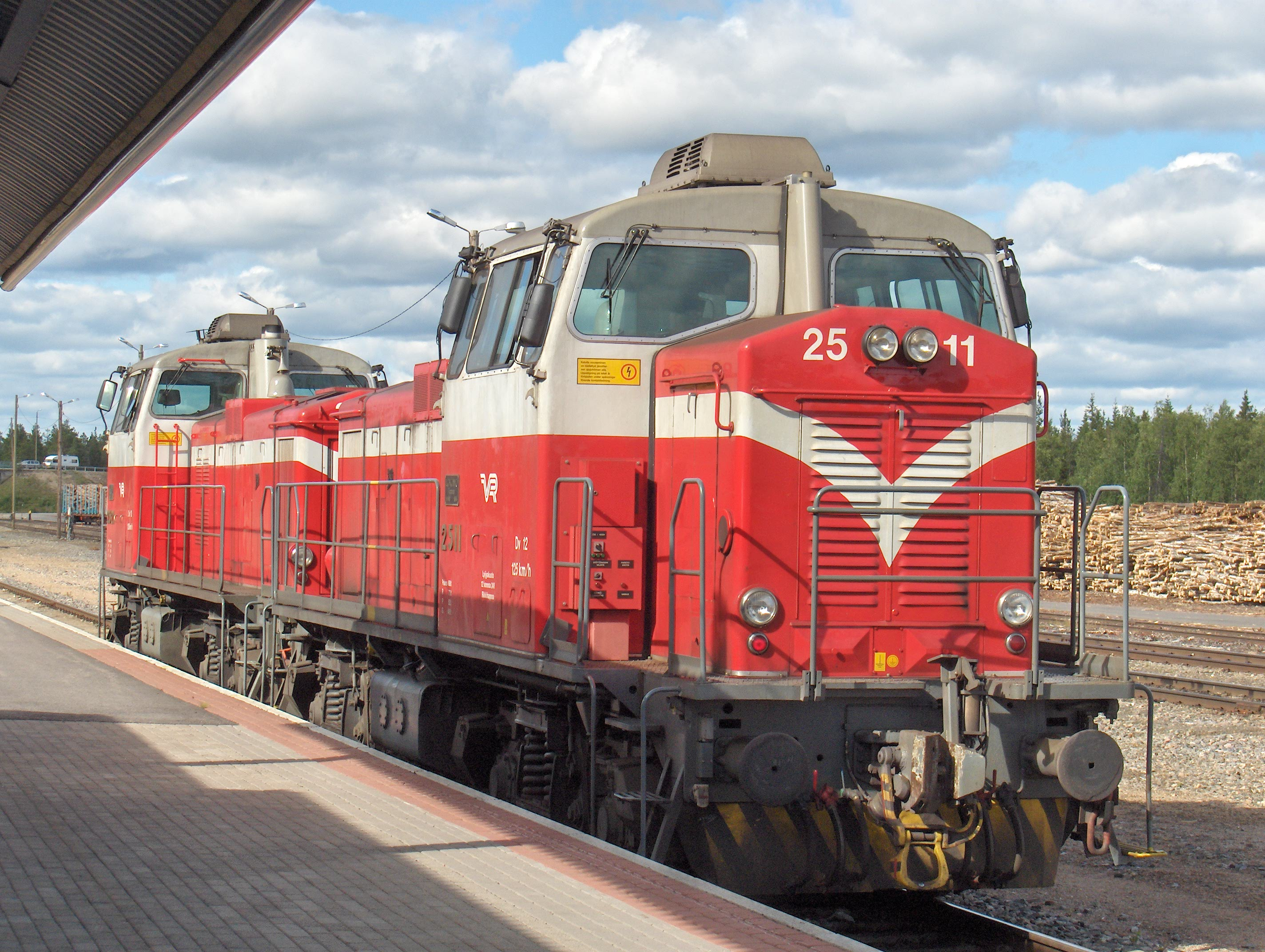
A pair of Dv12 locomotives at Kolari railway station

In Finland, over 200 Finnish-built VR class Dv12 and Dr14 diesel–hydraulics with Voith transmissions have been continuously used since the early 1960s. All units of Dr14 class and most units of Dv12 class are still in service. VR has abandoned some weak-conditioned units of 2700 series Dv12s.

In the 21st century series production standard gauge diesel–hydraulic designs include the Voith Gravita, ordered by Deutsche Bahn, and the Vossloh G2000 BB, G1206 and G1700 designs, all manufactured in Germany for freight use.

==== Multiple units ====
Diesel–hydraulic drive is common in multiple units, with various transmission designs used including Voith torque converters, and fluid couplings in combination with mechanical gearing.

The majority of British Rail's second generation passenger DMU stock used hydraulic transmission. In the 21st century, designs using hydraulic transmission include Bombardier's Turbostar, Talent, RegioSwinger families; diesel engined versions of the Siemens Desiro platform, and the Stadler Regio-Shuttle.

=== Diesel–steam ===
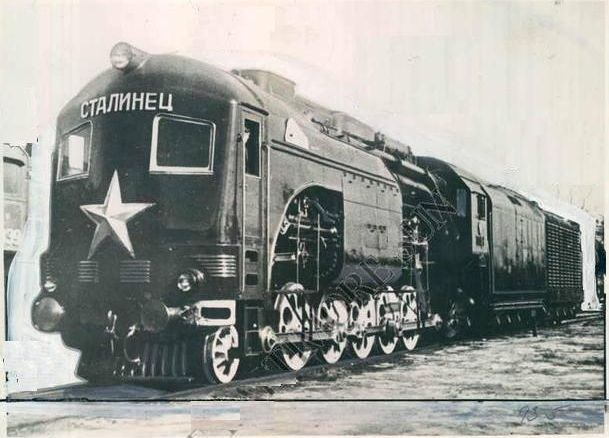
Soviet Locomotive TP1

Steam–diesel hybrid locomotives can use steam generated from a boiler or diesel to power a piston engine. The Cristiani Compressed Steam System used a diesel engine to power a compressor to drive and recirculate steam produced by a boiler; effectively using steam as the power transmission medium, with the diesel engine being the prime mover.

=== Diesel–pneumatic ===
The diesel–pneumatic locomotive was of interest in the 1930s because it offered the possibility of converting existing steam locomotives to diesel operation. The frame and cylinders of the steam locomotive would be retained and the boiler would be replaced by a diesel engine driving an air compressor. The problem was low thermal efficiency, with the air compressor losing much heat to the environment. Attempts were made to compensate for this by using the diesel exhaust to re-heat the compressed air but these had limited success. A German proposal of 1929 did result in a prototype but a similar British proposal of 1932, to use an LNER Class R1 locomotive, never got beyond the design stage.

== Multiple-unit operation ==
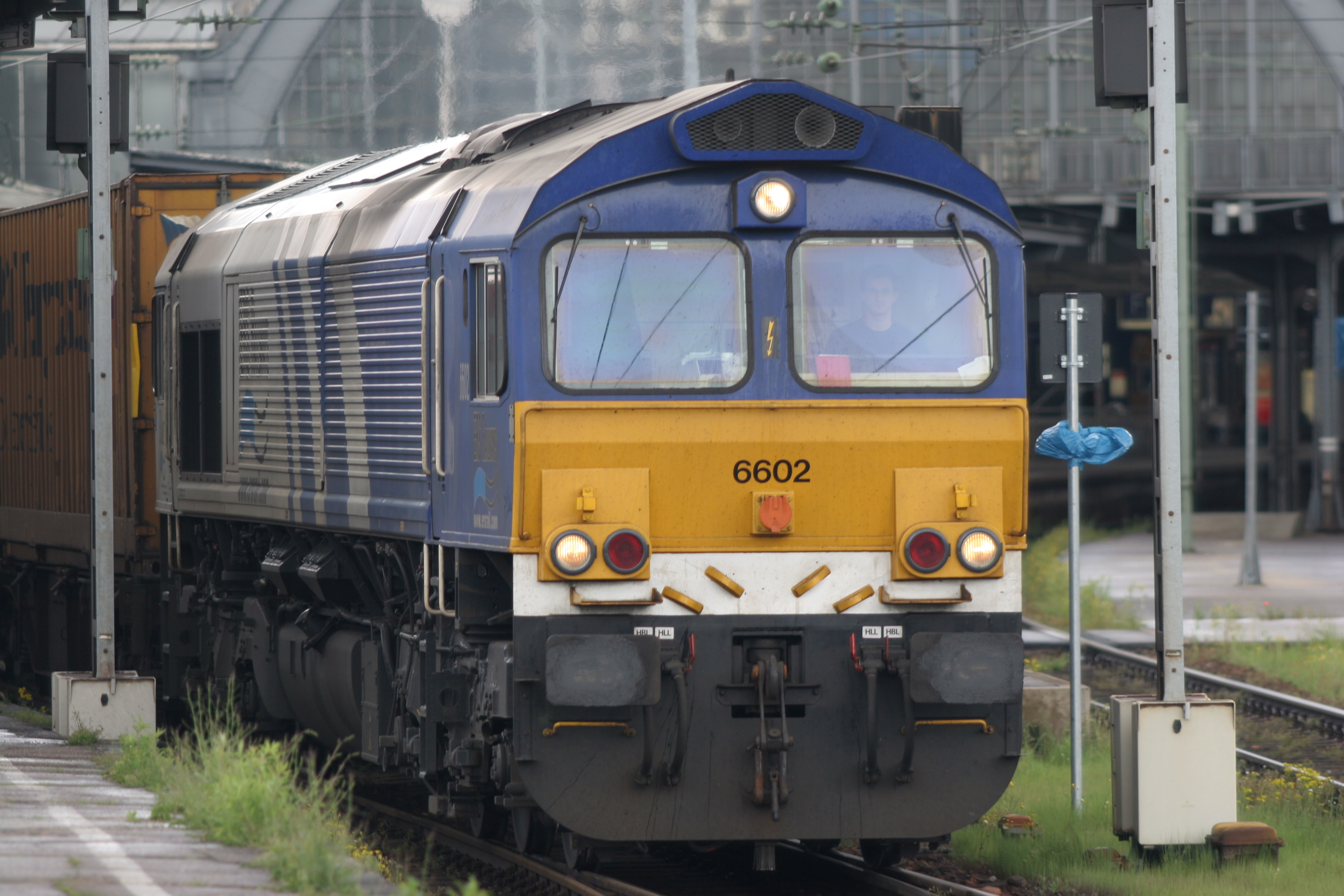
Diesel–electric locomotive built by EMD for service in the UK and continental Europe

Most diesel locomotives are capable of multiple-unit operation (MU) as a means of increasing horsepower and tractive effort when hauling heavy trains. All North American locomotives, including export models, use a standardized AAR electrical control system interconnected by a 27-pin MU cable between the units. For UK-built locomotives, a number of incompatible control systems are used, but the most common is the Blue Star system, which is electro-pneumatic and fitted to most early diesel classes. A small number of types, typically higher-powered locomotives intended for passenger-only work, do not have multiple control systems. In all cases, the electrical control connections made common to all units in a consist are referred to as trainlines. The result is that all locomotives in a consist behave as one in response to the engine driver's control movements.

The ability to couple diesel–electric locomotives in an MU fashion was first introduced in the EMC EA/EB of 1937. Electrical interconnections were made so one engine driver could operate the entire consist from the head-end unit.

In mountainous regions, it is common to interpose helper locomotives in the middle of the train, both to provide the extra power needed to ascend a grade and to limit the amount of stress applied to the draft gear of the car coupled to the head-end power. The helper units in such distributed power configurations are controlled from the lead unit's cab through coded radio signals. Although this is technically not an MU configuration, the behaviour is the same as with physically interconnected units.

=== Cab arrangements ===
Cab arrangements vary by builder and operator. Practice in the U.S. has traditionally been for a cab at one end of the locomotive with limited visibility if the locomotive is not operated cab forward. This is not usually a problem as U.S. locomotives are usually operated in pairs, or threes, and arranged so that a cab is at each end of each set. European practice is usually for a cab at each end of the locomotive as trains are usually light enough to operate with one locomotive. Early U.S. practice was to add power units without cabs (booster or B units) and the arrangement was often A-B, A-A, A-B-A, A-B-B, or A-B-B-A where A was a unit with a cab. Center cabs were sometimes used for switch locomotives.

=== Cow–calf ===
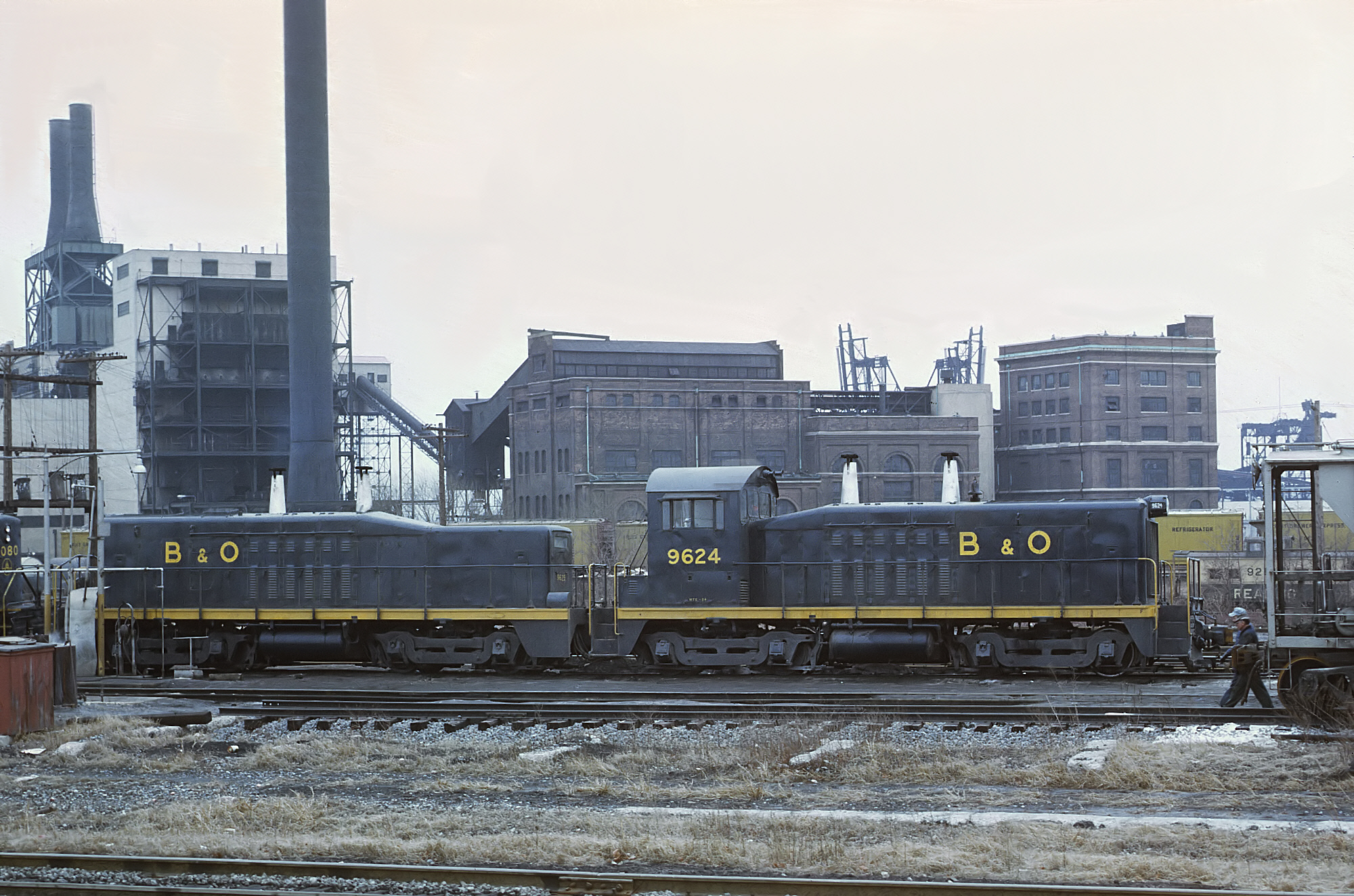
EMD TR4 cow–calf locomotive

In North American railroading, a cow–calf set is a pair of switcher-type locomotives: one (the cow) equipped with a driving cab, the other (the calf) without a cab, such that the pair can be controlled from the single cab. This arrangement is also known as master–slave. Cow–calf sets are used in heavy switching and hump yard service. Some are radio-controlled without an operating engineer present in the cab. Where two connected units were present, EMD called these TR-2s (with approximately 2,000 hp or 1,500 kW); where three units, TR-3s (with approximately 3,000 hp or 2,200 kW).

Cow–calves have largely disappeared as these engine combinations exceeded their economic lifetimes many years ago.

Present North American practice is to pair two 3,000 hp GP40-2 or SD40-2 road switchers, often nearly worn-out and very soon ready for rebuilding or scrapping, and to utilize these for so-called transfer uses, for which the TR-2, TR-3 and TR-4 engines were originally intended, hence the designation TR, for transfer.

Occasionally, the second unit may have its prime mover and traction alternator removed and replaced by concrete or steel ballast and the power for traction obtained from a master unit. As a 16-cylinder prime mover generally weighs in the 36,000-pound (16,000 kg) range, and a 3,000 hp traction alternator generally weighs in the 18,000-pound (8,200 kg) range, around 54,000 lb (24,000 kg) would be needed for ballast.

A pair of fully capable Dash 2 units would be rated 6,000 hp (4,500 kW). A Dash 2 pair in which only one had a prime-mover and alternator would be rated 3,000 hp (2,200 kW), with all power provided by the master, while the combination benefits from the tractive effort provided by the slave as engines in transfer service are seldom called upon to provide 3,000 hp, much less 6,000 hp, continuously.

== Fittings and appliances ==
=== Flame-proofing ===
A standard diesel locomotive presents a very low fire risk but flame-proofing can reduce the risk even further. This involves fitting a water-filled box to the exhaust pipe to quench any red-hot carbon particles that may be emitted. Other precautions may include a fully insulated electrical system (neither side earthed to the frame) and all electric wiring enclosed in conduit.

The flameproof diesel locomotive has replaced the fireless steam locomotive in areas of high fire risk such as oil refineries and ammunition dumps. Preserved examples of flameproof diesel locomotives include:

- Francis Baily of Thatcham (ex-RAF Welford) at Southall Railway Centre
- Naworth (ex-National Coal Board) at the South Tynedale Railway

Latest development of the "Flameproof Diesel Vehicle Applied New Exhaust Gas Dry Type Treatment System" does not need the water supply.

=== Lights ===
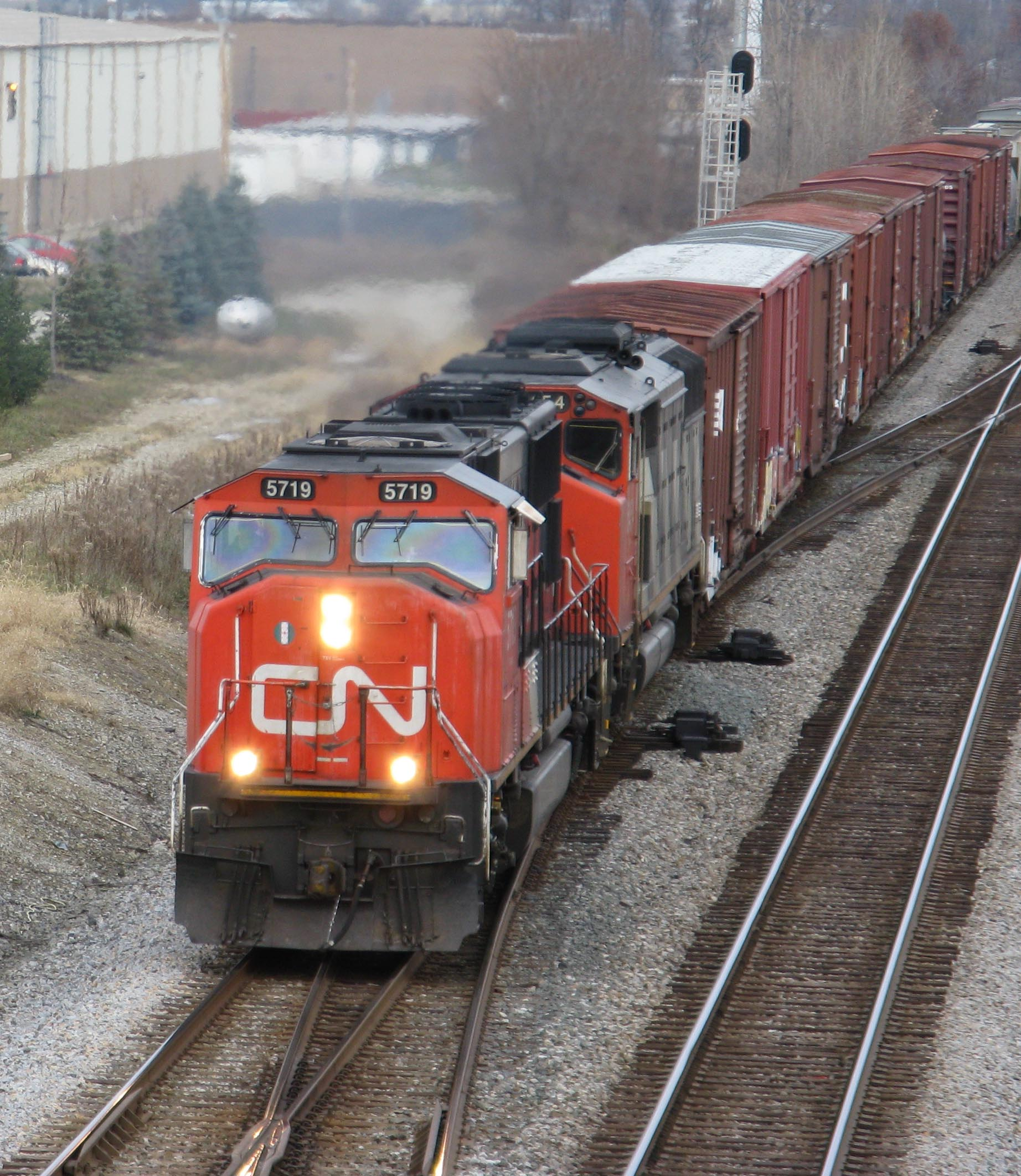
A Canadian National Railway train showing the placement of the headlight and ditch lights on the locomotive

The lights fitted to diesel locomotives vary from country to country. North American locomotives are fitted with two headlights (for safety in case one malfunctions) and a pair of ditch lights. The latter are fitted low down at the front and are designed to make the locomotive easily visible as it approaches a grade crossing. Older locomotives may be fitted with a Gyralite or Mars Light instead of the ditch lights.

== Environmental impact ==
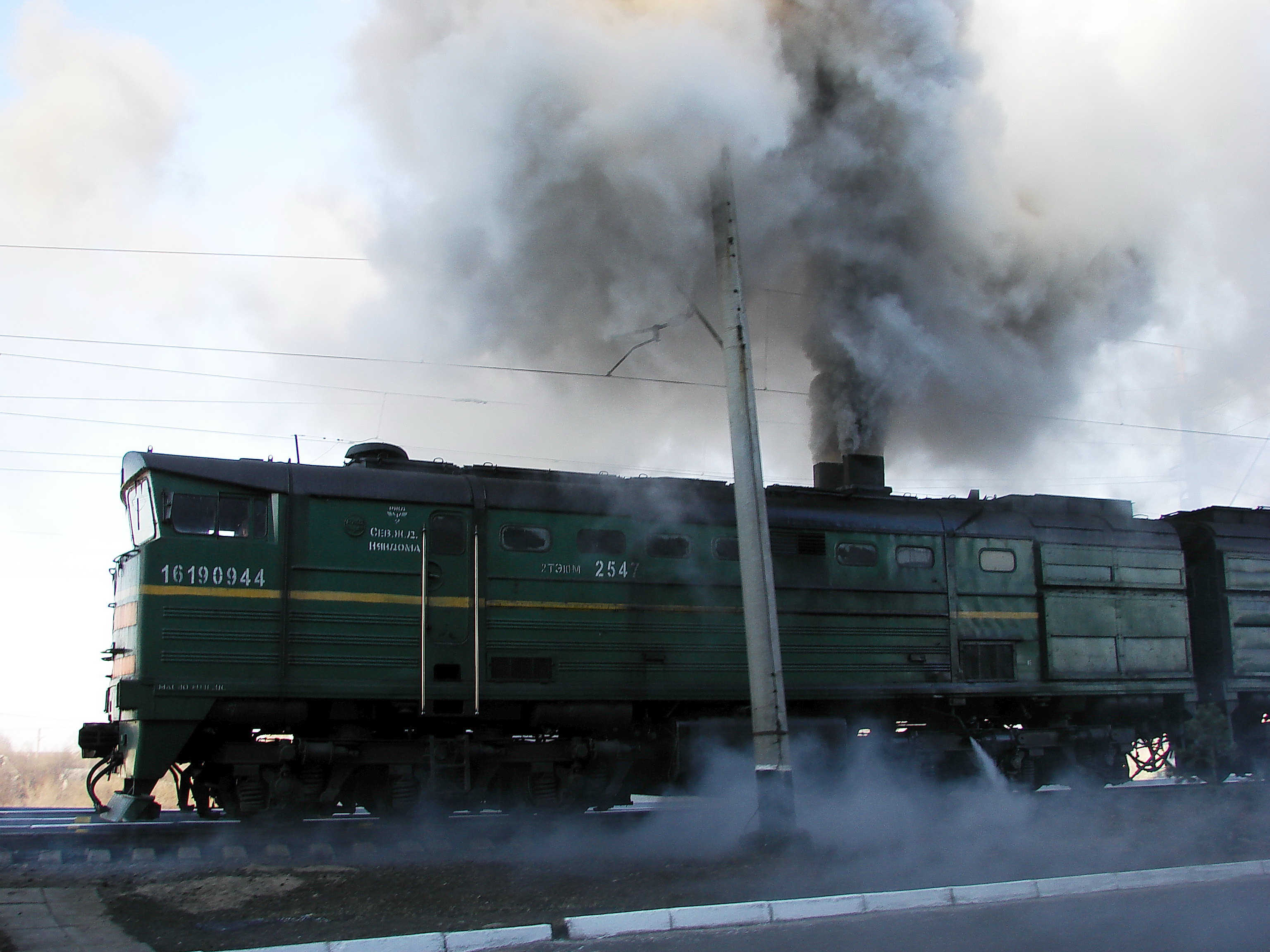
Air pollution by Soviet 2TE10M diesel locomotive

Although diesel locomotives generally emit less sulphur dioxide, a major pollutant to the environment, and greenhouse gases than steam locomotives, they still emit large amounts. Furthermore, like other diesel powered vehicles, they emit nitrogen oxides and fine particles, which are a risk to public health. In fact, in this last respect diesel locomotives may perform worse than steam locomotives.

For years, it was thought by American government scientists who measure air pollution that diesel locomotive engines were relatively clean and emitted far less health-threatening emissions than those of diesel trucks or other vehicles; however, the scientists discovered that because they used faulty estimates of the amount of fuel consumed by diesel locomotives, they grossly understated the amount of pollution generated annually. After revising their calculations, they concluded that the annual emissions of nitrogen oxide, a major ingredient in smog and acid rain, and soot would be by 2030 nearly twice what they originally assumed. In Europe, where most major railways have been electrified, there is less concern.

This would mean that in the USA diesel locomotives would be releasing more than 800,000 tons of nitrogen oxide and 25,000 tons of soot every year within a quarter of a century, in contrast to the EPA's previous projections of 480,000 tons of nitrogen dioxide and 12,000 tons of soot. Since this was discovered, to reduce the effects of the diesel locomotive on humans (who are breathing the noxious emissions) and on plants and animals, it is considered practical to install traps in the diesel engines to reduce pollution levels and other methods of pollution control (e.g., use of biodiesel).

Diesel locomotive pollution has been of particular concern in the city of Chicago. The Chicago Tribune reported levels of diesel soot inside locomotives leaving Chicago at levels hundreds of times above what is normally found on streets outside. Residents of several neighborhoods are most likely exposed to diesel emissions at levels several times higher than the national average for urban areas.

=== Mitigation ===
In 2008, the United States Environmental Protection Agency (EPA) mandated regulations requiring all new or refurbished diesel locomotives to meet Tier II pollution standards that slash the amount of allowable soot by 90% and require an 80% reduction in nitrogen oxide emissions. See List of low emissions locomotives.

Other technologies that are being deployed to reduce diesel locomotive emissions and fuel consumption include "Genset" switching locomotives and hybrid Green Goat designs. Genset locomotives use multiple smaller high-speed diesel engines and generators (generator sets), rather than a single medium-speed diesel engine and a single generator. Because of the cost of developing clean engines, these smaller high-speed engines are based on already developed truck engines. Green Goats are a type of hybrid switching locomotive utilizing a small diesel engine and a large bank of rechargeable batteries. Switching locomotives are of particular concern as they typically operate in a limited area, often in or near urban centers, and spend much of their time idling. Both designs reduce pollution below EPA Tier II standards and cut or eliminate emissions during idle.

== Advantages over steam ==
As diesel locomotives advanced, the cost of manufacturing and operating them dropped, and they became cheaper to own and operate than steam locomotives. In North America, steam locomotives were custom-made for specific railway routes, so economies of scale were difficult to achieve. Though more complex to produce with exacting manufacturing tolerances (1/10000-inch or 0.0025-millimetre for diesel, compared with 1/100-inch (0.25 mm) for steam), diesel locomotive parts were easier to mass-produce. Baldwin Locomotive Works offered almost 500 steam models in its heyday, while EMD offered fewer than ten diesel varieties. In the United Kingdom, British Railways built steam locomotives to standard designs from 1951 onwards. These included standard, interchangeable parts, making them cheaper to produce than the diesel locomotives then available. The capital cost per drawbar horse power was £13 6s (steam), £65 (diesel), £69 7s (turbine) and £17 13s (electric).

Diesel locomotives offer significant operating advantages over steam locomotives. They can safely be operated by one person, making them ideal for switching/shunting duties in yards (although for safety reasons many main-line diesel locomotives continue to have two-person crews: an engineer and a conductor/switchman) and the operating environment is much more attractive, being quieter, fully weatherproof and without the dirt and heat that is an inevitable part of operating a steam locomotive. Diesel locomotives can be worked in multiple with a single crew controlling multiple locomotives in a single train – something not practical with steam locomotives. This brought greater efficiencies to the operator, as individual locomotives could be relatively low-powered for use as a single unit on light duties but marshaled together to provide the power needed on a heavy train. With steam traction, a single very powerful and expensive locomotive was required for the heaviest trains, or the operator resorted to double heading with multiple locomotives and crews, a method which was also expensive and brought with it its own operating difficulties.

Diesel engines can be started and stopped almost instantly, meaning that a diesel locomotive has the potential to incur no fuel costs when not being used. However, it is still the practice of large North American railroads to use straight water as a coolant in diesel engines instead of coolants that incorporate anti-freezing properties; this results in diesel locomotives being left idling when parked in cold climates instead of being completely shut down. A diesel engine can be left idling unattended for hours or even days, especially since practically every diesel engine used in locomotives has systems that automatically shut the engine down if problems such as a loss of oil pressure or coolant loss occur. Automatic start/stop systems are available which monitor coolant and engine temperatures. When the unit is close to having its coolant freeze, the system restarts the diesel engine to warm the coolant and other systems.

Steam locomotives require intensive maintenance, lubrication, and cleaning before, during, and after use. Preparing and firing a steam locomotive for use from cold can take many hours. They can be kept in readiness between uses with a low fire, but this requires regular stoking and frequent attention to maintain the level of water in the boiler. This may be necessary to prevent the water in the boiler freezing in cold climates, so long as the water supply is not frozen. After use a steam locomotive requires a lengthy disposal operation to perform cleaning, inspection, maintenance and refilling with water and fuel before it is ready for its next duty. By contrast, as early as 1939 EMD was promoting its FT Series locomotive as needing no maintenance between 30-day inspections beyond refuelling and basic fluid level and safety checks which could be performed with the prime mover still running. Railways converting from steam to diesel operation in the 1940s and 1950s found that for a given period diesel locomotives were available for, on average, three or four times more revenue-earning hours than equivalent steam locomotives, allowing locomotive fleets to be cut drastically in size while maintaining operational capacity.

The maintenance and operational costs of steam locomotives were much higher than diesels. Annual maintenance costs for steam locomotives accounted for 25% of the initial purchase price. Spare parts were cast from wooden masters for specific locomotives. The sheer number of unique steam locomotives meant that there was no feasible way for spare-part inventories to be maintained. With diesel locomotives spare parts could be mass-produced and held in stock ready for use and many parts and sub-assemblies could be standardized across an operator's fleet using different models of locomotive from the same builder. Modern diesel locomotive engines are designed to allow the power assemblies (systems of working parts and their block interfaces) to be replaced while keeping the main block in the locomotive, which greatly reduces the time that a locomotive is out of revenue-generating service when it requires maintenance.

Steam engines required large quantities of coal and water, which were expensive variable operating costs. Further, the thermal efficiency of steam was considerably less than that of diesel engines. Diesel's theoretical studies demonstrated potential thermal efficiencies for a compression ignition engine of 36% (compared with 6–10% for steam), and an 1897 one-cylinder prototype operated at a remarkable 26% efficiency.

However, one study published in 1959 suggested that many of the comparisons between diesel and steam locomotives were made unfairly, mostly because diesels were a newer technology. After painstaking analysis of financial records and technological progress, the author found that if research had continued on steam technology instead of diesel, there would be negligible financial benefit in converting to diesel locomotion.

By the mid-1960s, diesel locomotives had effectively replaced steam locomotives where electric traction was not in use. Attempts to develop advanced steam technology continue in the 21st century but have not had a significant effect.

== See also ==
- Alternative fuels for diesel engines
- Diesel multiple unit
- Gas turbine locomotive
- Heilmann locomotive
- Hybrid electric vehicle
- Non-road engine
