= Internal combustion locomotive =

Fossil fuel-burning railway locomotive

An internal combustion locomotive is a type of railway locomotive that produces its pulling power using an internal combustion engine. These locomotives are fuelled by burning fossil fuels, most commonly oil or gasoline (UK: petrol), to produce rotational power which is transmitted to the locomotive's driving wheels by various direct or indirect transmission mechanisms. The fuel is carried on the locomotive.

== Kerosene ==
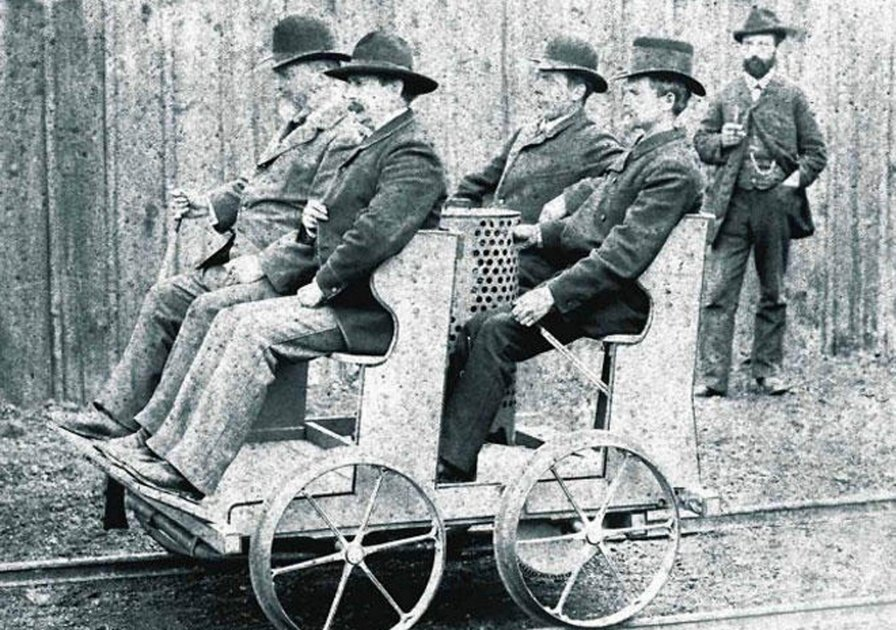
The 1887 Daimler draisine

Kerosene locomotives use kerosene as the fuel. They were the world's first oil locomotives, preceding diesel and other oil locomotives by some years.

The first known kerosene rail vehicle was a draisine built by Gottlieb Daimler in 1887, for the Daimler Paraffin Railway. This was not technically a locomotive as it carried passengers and did not haul other items of rolling stock.

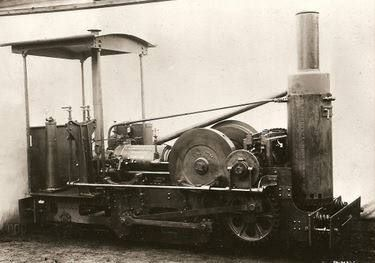
Hornsby kerosene locomotive "Lachesis" of 1896

A kerosene locomotive was built in 1894 by the Priestman Brothers of Kingston upon Hull for use on Hull docks. This locomotive was built using a 12 hp double-acting marine type engine, running at 300 rpm, mounted on a 4-wheel wagon chassis. It was only able to haul one loaded wagon at a time, due to its low power output, and was not a great success. The first successful kerosene locomotive was "Lachesis" built by Richard Hornsby & Sons Ltd. and delivered to Woolwich Arsenal railway in 1896. The company built a series of kerosene locomotives between 1896 and 1903, for use by the British military.

== Benzene ==
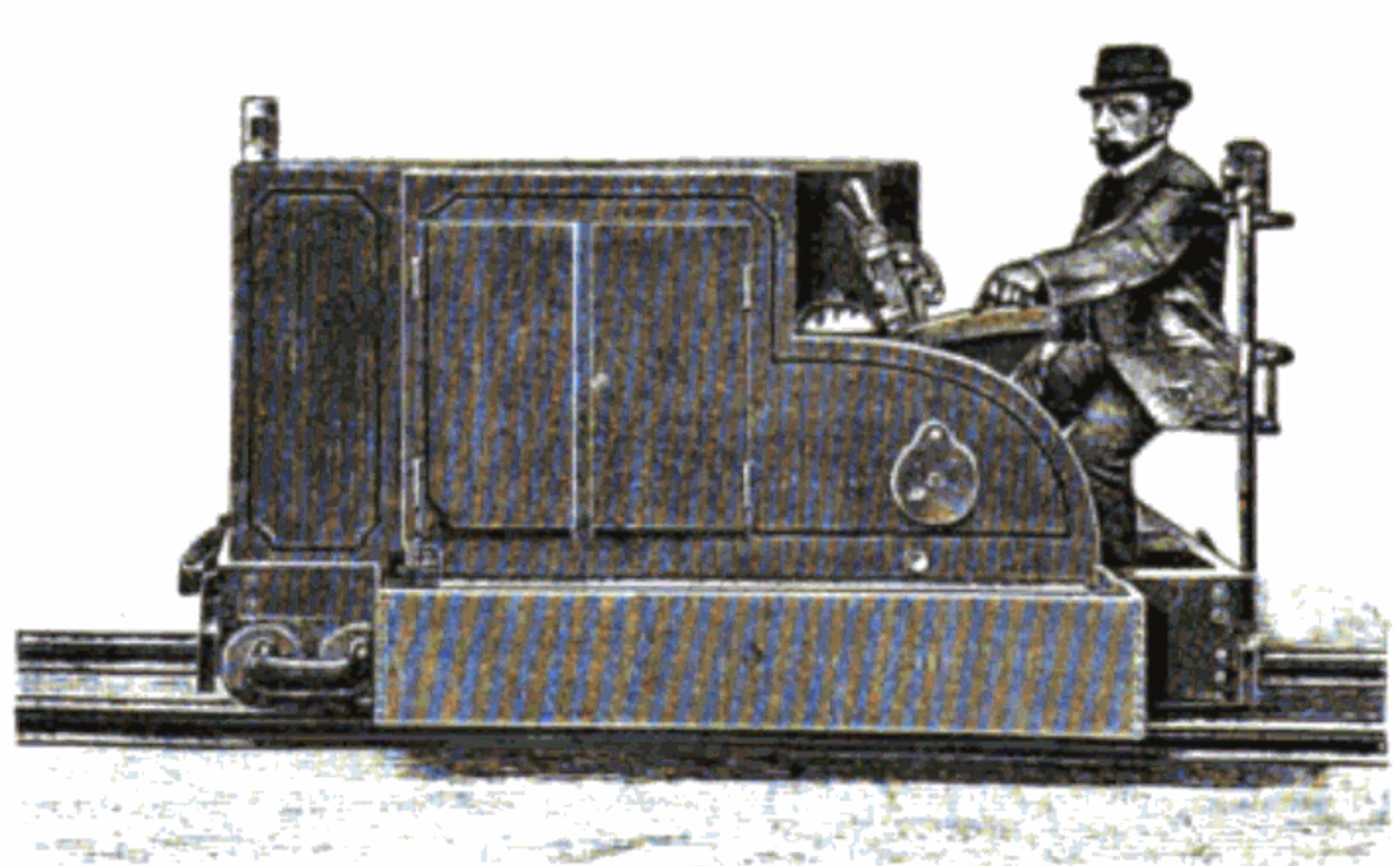
Benzine-fueled locomotive built by Deutz

Benzene locomotives have an internal combustion engines that use benzene as fuel. There were a number of commercial manufacturers of Benzene locomotives operating in the 1890s and 1900s. Deutz produced a successful locomotive in the late 1890s, based on a prototype for a manganese mine in Giessen. In the early 1900s, Oberursel of Frankfurt sold locomotives for mining and tunnelling operations. They did not see widespread use after the 1900s, being superseded by petrol and diesel locomotives.

== Naphthalene ==
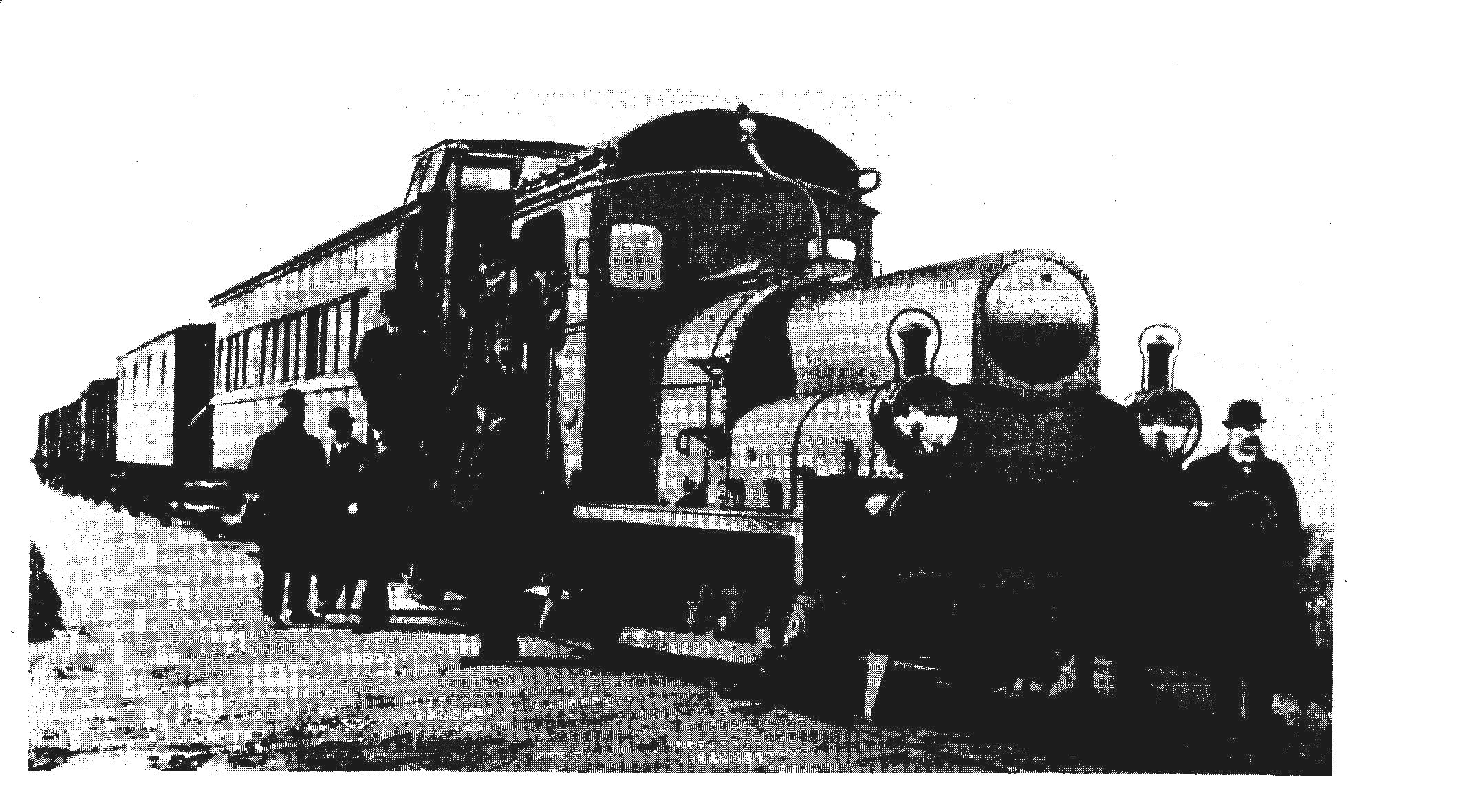
Naphthalene locomotive, 1913

A naphthalene locomotive was tested in France in 1913. It was built by Schneider-Creusot for use in their own plant.

== Petrol ==
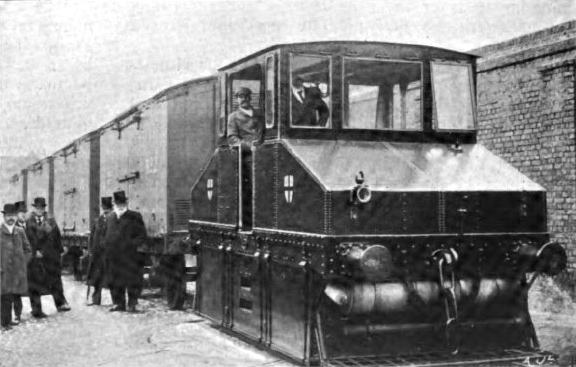
The 1902 Maudslay Petrol Locomotive

Petrol locomotives (US: gasoline locomotives) use petrol as their fuel. The earliest gasoline locomotive in the western United States was built by the Best Manufacturing Company in 1891 for San Jose and Alum Rock Railroad. It was only a limited success and was returned to Best in 1892.

In the United Kingdom, the first commercially successful petrol locomotive was a petrol-mechanical locomotive built by the Maudslay Motor Company in 1902, for the Deptford Cattle Market in London. It was an 80 hp locomotive using a 3-cylinder vertical petrol engine, with a two speed mechanical gearbox. The second locomotive was built by F.C. Blake of Kew in January 1903 for the Richmond Main Sewerage Board.

Although a number of one-off and small classes of petrol locomotives were built before 1914, it was the First World War that saw the introduction of mass-produced locomotives. In 1916, Motor Rail started production of its "Simplex" petrol locomotives, with 20-40 hp motors and 4-wheel mechanical transmission began to be used on 600 mm (1 ft 11 5/8 in) gauge trench railways on the Western Front. The War Department also ordered large petrol-electric locomotives from Dick, Kerr & Co. and British Westinghouse, which used a 45 hp Dorman 4JO four-cylinder petrol engine driving a 30 kW DC generator at 1,000 rpm. In all, 1,216 petrol-mechanical and 42 petrol-electric locomotives were used in service by the Allied Forces. Many of these petrol locomotives were sold off as surplus after the end of hostilities, and found work on small industrial railways. Motor Rail continued to develop and manufacture and develop the design, for several decades.

=== Petrol-mechanical ===
The most common type of petrol locomotive are petrol-mechanical locomotives, which use mechanical transmission. The earliest examples of these locomotives used a plate or cone clutch and mechanical gear-box driving the main axle either directly, via a chain drives or using bevel gears.

=== Petrol–electric ===
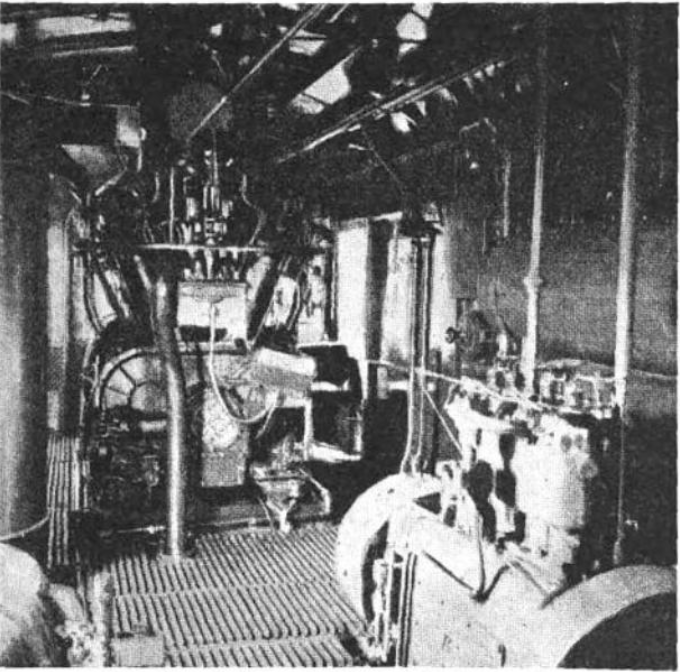
The interior of a Petrol-electric locomotive showing the engine and dynamo

Petrol–electric locomotives are petrol locomotives that use electric transmission to deliver the power output of the engine to the driving wheels. This avoids the need for gearboxes by converting the rotary mechanical force of the engine into electrical energy by a dynamo, and then powering the wheels by multi-speed electric traction motors. This allows for smoother acceleration as it avoids the need for gear changes, and the power output can be divided amongst multiple motors, which gives greater traction control. However the generating equipment is more expensive, heavier, and often more complex to maintain than mechanical transmission.

The first petrol-electric locomotive was developed by William H. Patton He received a patent for a petrol-mechanical locomotive in 1887. In 1888, he partnered with the Pullman Company to develop a streetcar locomotive that used gasoline engines to charge a battery that powered electric motors. The first of these was sold in 1891 and the company continued to sell Patton motors until the start of World War One.

A notable early petrol–electric locomotive was built in 1913 for the Minneapolis, St. Paul, Rochester and Dubuque Electric Traction Company. It weighed 60 tons, generated 350 hp and drove through a pair of bogies in a Bo-Bo arrangement.

== Diesel ==
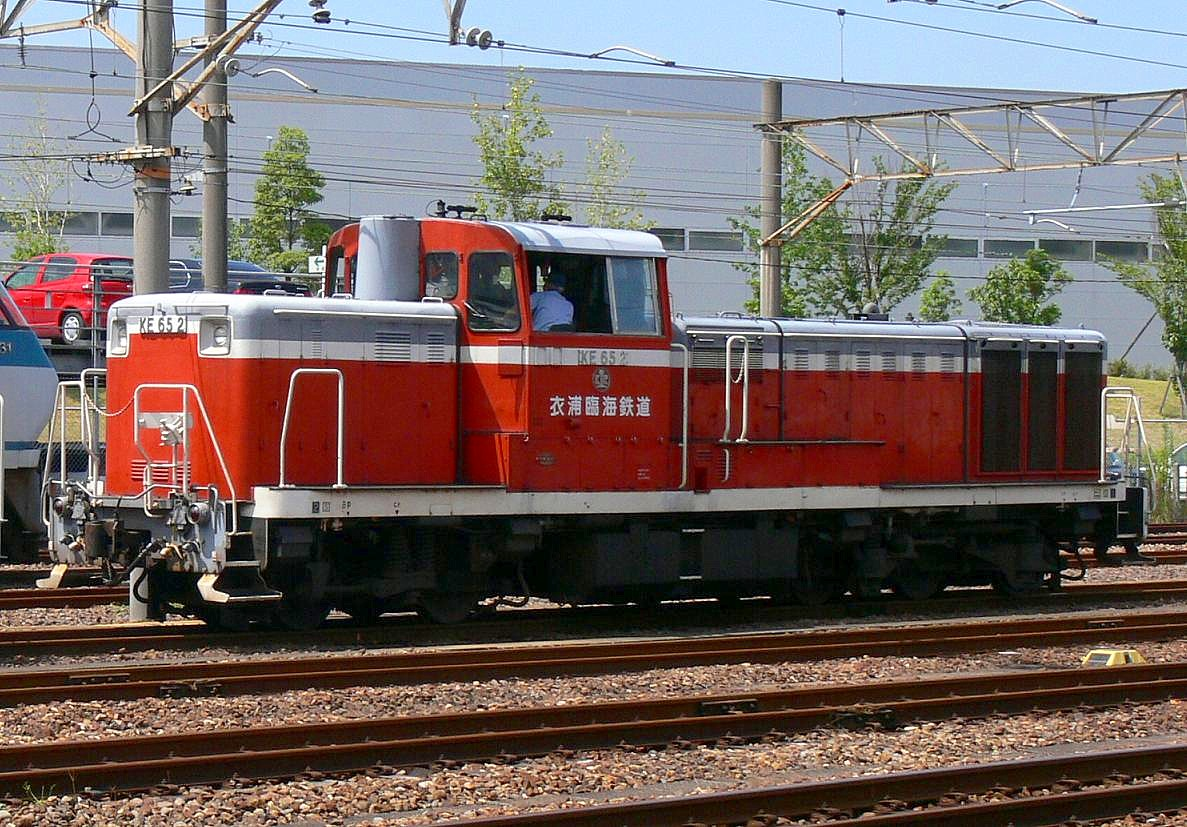
KE65 diesel locomotive of the Kinuura Rinkai Railway

Diesel locomotives are powered by diesel engines. In the early days of Diesel propulsion development, various transmission systems were employed with varying degrees of success, with electric transmission proving to be the most popular.

=== Diesel-mechanical ===
Schematic illustration of a diesel-mechanical locomotive

A diesel–mechanical locomotive uses mechanical transmission to transfer power to the wheels. This type of transmission is generally limited to low-powered, low speed shunting (switching) locomotives, lightweight multiple units and self-propelled railcars. The earliest diesel locomotives were diesel-mechanical.

The mechanical transmissions used for railroad propulsion are generally more complex and much more robust than standard-road versions. There is usually a fluid coupling interposed between the engine and gearbox, and the gearbox is often of the epicyclic (planetary) type to permit shifting while under load. Various systems have been devised to minimise the break in transmission during gear changing; e.g., the S.S.S. (synchro-self-shifting) gearbox used by Hudswell Clarke. Diesel–mechanical propulsion is limited by the difficulty of building a reasonably sized transmission capable of coping with the power and torque required to move a heavy train.

In 1906, Rudolf Diesel, Adolf Klose and the steam and diesel engine manufacturer Gebrüder Sulzer founded Diesel-Sulzer-Klose GmbH to manufacture diesel-powered locomotives. The Prussian State Railways ordered a diesel locomotive from the company in 1909. The world's first diesel-powered locomotive (a diesel-mechanical locomotive) was operated in the summer of 1912 on the Winterthur–Romanshorn railway in Switzerland, but was not a commercial success. The locomotive weight was 95 tonnes and the power was 883 kW with a maximum speed of 100 km/h. Small numbers of prototype diesel locomotives were produced in a number of countries through the mid-1920s.

=== Diesel-electric ===
Schematic diagram of diesel electric locomotive

Diesel–electric locomotives are diesel locomotives using electric transmission. In this arrangement, the diesel engine drives either an electrical DC generator (generally, less than 3,000 horsepower (2,200 kW) net for traction), or an electrical AC alternator-rectifier (generally 3,000 horsepower (2,200 kW) net or more for traction), the output of which provides power to the traction motors that drive the locomotive. There is no mechanical connection between the diesel engine and the wheels. The vast majority of diesel locomotives today are diesel-electric.

The important components of diesel–electric propulsion are the diesel engine (also known as the prime mover), the main generator/alternator-rectifier, traction motors (usually with four or six axles), and a control system consisting of the engine governor and electrical or electronic components, including switchgear, rectifiers and other components, which control or modify the electrical supply to the traction motors. In the most elementary case, the generator may be directly connected to the motors with only very simple switchgear.

Originally, the traction motors and generator were DC machines. Following the development of high-capacity silicon rectifiers in the 1960s, the DC generator was replaced by an alternator using a diode bridge to convert its output to DC. This advance greatly improved locomotive reliability and decreased generator maintenance costs by elimination of the commutator and brushes in the generator. Elimination of the brushes and commutator, in turn, disposed of the possibility of a particularly destructive event called a flashover, which could result in immediate generator failure and, in some cases, start an engine room fire.

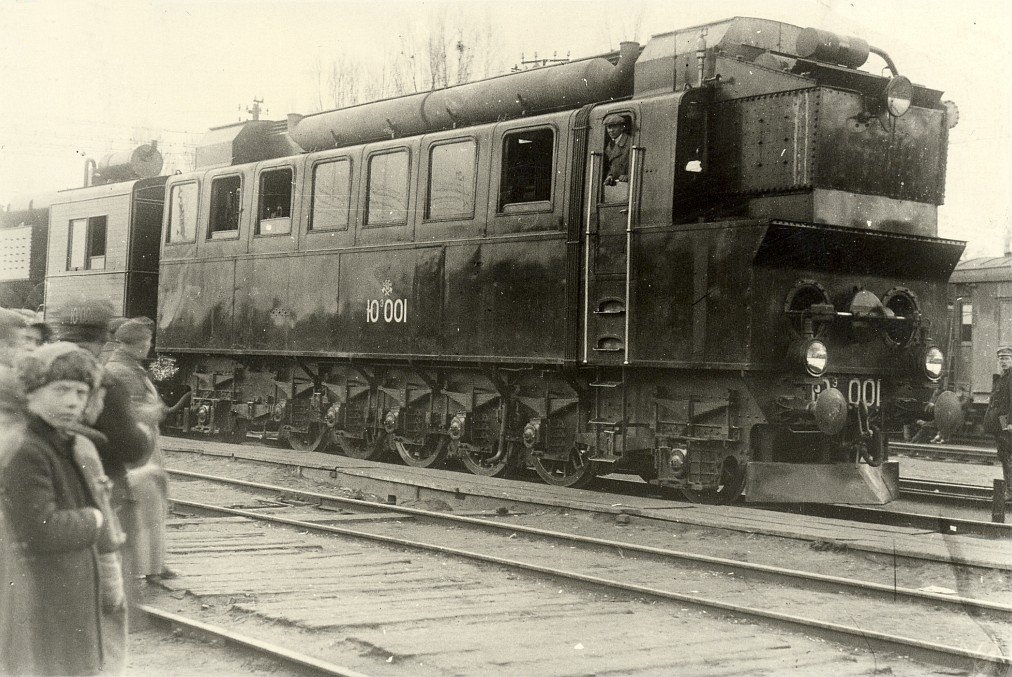
World's first useful diesel locomotive (a diesel-electric locomotive) for long distances SŽD Eel2, 1924 in Kyiv

In the late 1980s, the development of high-power variable-frequency/variable-voltage (VVVF) drives, or "traction inverters," has allowed the use of polyphase AC traction motors, thus also eliminating the motor commutator and brushes. The result is a more efficient and reliable drive that requires relatively little maintenance and is better able to cope with overload conditions that often destroyed the older types of motors.

In 1914, Hermann Lemp, a General Electric electrical engineer, developed and patented a reliable direct current electrical control system (subsequent improvements were also patented by Lemp). Lemp's design used a single lever to control both engine and generator in a coordinated fashion, and was the prototype for all diesel–electric locomotive control. In 1917–18, GE produced three experimental diesel–electric locomotives using Lemp's control design. In 1924, a diesel-electric locomotive (E^{el}2 original number Юэ 001/Yu-e 001) started operations. It had been designed by a team led by Yuri Lomonosov and built 1923–1924 by Maschinenfabrik Esslingen in Germany. It had 5 driving axles (1'E1'). After several test rides, it hauled trains for almost three decades from 1925 to 1954. It was the world's first functional diesel locomotive.

=== Diesel-hydraulic ===
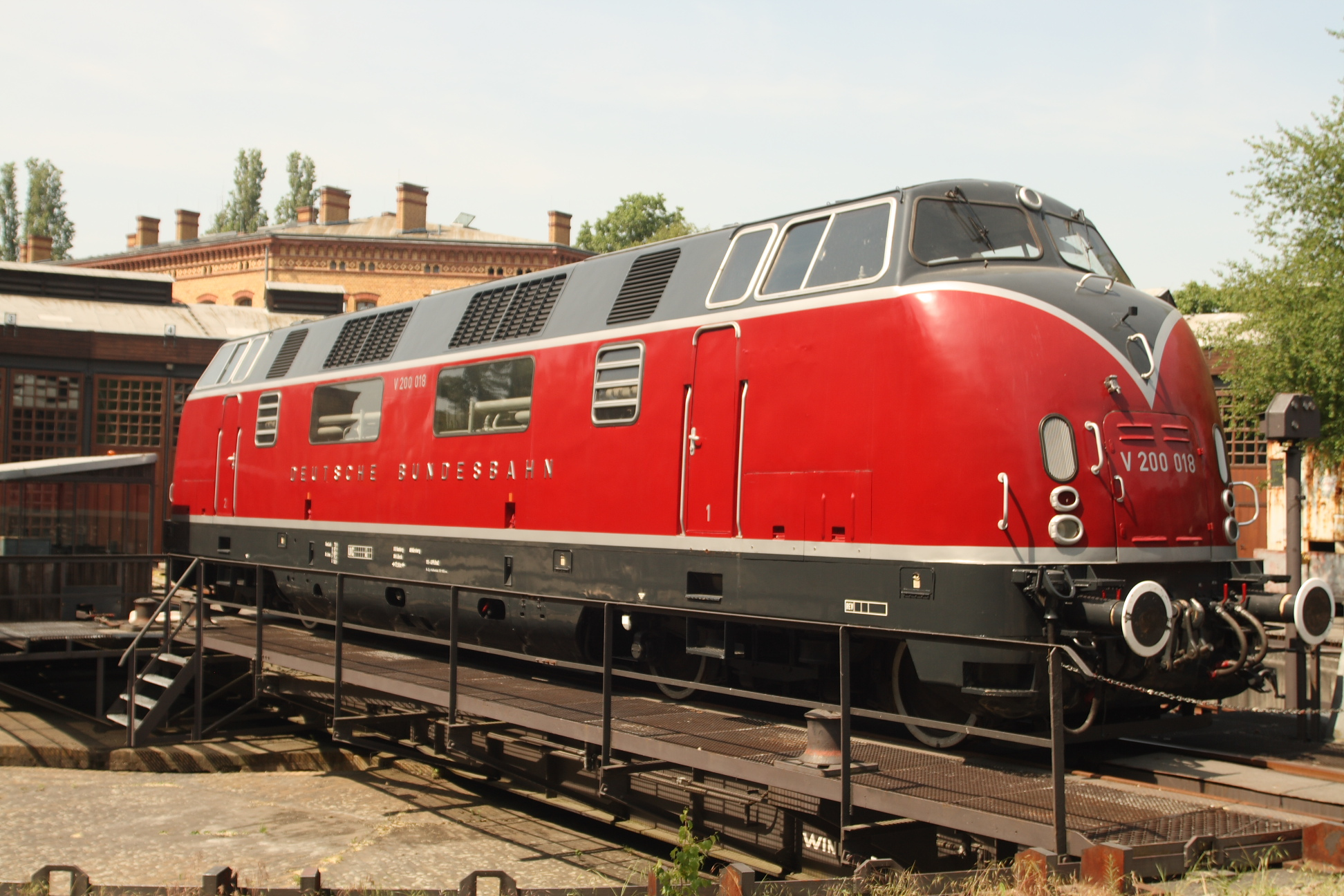
A German DB Class V 200 diesel-hydraulic locomotive at Technikmuseum, Berlin

Diesel–hydraulic locomotives are diesel locomotives using hydraulic transmission. In this arrangement, they use one or more torque converters, in combination with gears, with a mechanical final drive to convey the power from the diesel engine to the wheels.

Hydrokinetic transmission (also called hydrodynamic transmission) uses a torque converter. A torque converter consists of three main parts, two of which rotate, and one (the stator) that has a lock preventing backwards rotation and adding output torque by redirecting the oil flow at low output RPM. All three main parts are sealed in an oil-filled housing. To match engine speed to load speed over the entire speed range of a locomotive some additional method is required to give sufficient range. One method is to follow the torque converter with a mechanical gearbox which switches ratios automatically, similar to an automatic transmission on a car. Another method is to provide several torque converters each with a range of variability covering part of the total required; all the torque converters are mechanically connected all the time, and the appropriate one for the speed range required is selected by filling it with oil and draining the others. The filling and draining is carried out with the transmission under load, and results in very smooth range changes with no break in the transmitted power.

The main worldwide user of main-line hydraulic transmissions was the Federal Republic of Germany, with designs including the 1950s DB class V 200, and the 1960 and 1970s DB Class V 160 family. British Rail introduced a number of diesel hydraulic designs during it 1955 Modernisation Plan, initially license built versions of German designs. In Spain Renfe used high power to weight ratio twin engined German designs to haul high speed trains from the 1960s to 1990s. (see Renfe classes 340, 350, 352, 353, 354).

Hydrostatic drive systems have also been applied to rail use, for example 350 to 750 hp (260 to 560 kW) shunting locomotives by CMI Group (Belgium), and 4 to 12 tonne 35 to 58 kW (47 to 78 hp) industrial locomotives by Atlas Copco subsidiary GIA. Hydrostatic drives are also used in railway maintenance machines such as tampers and rail grinders.

== Gas turbine ==
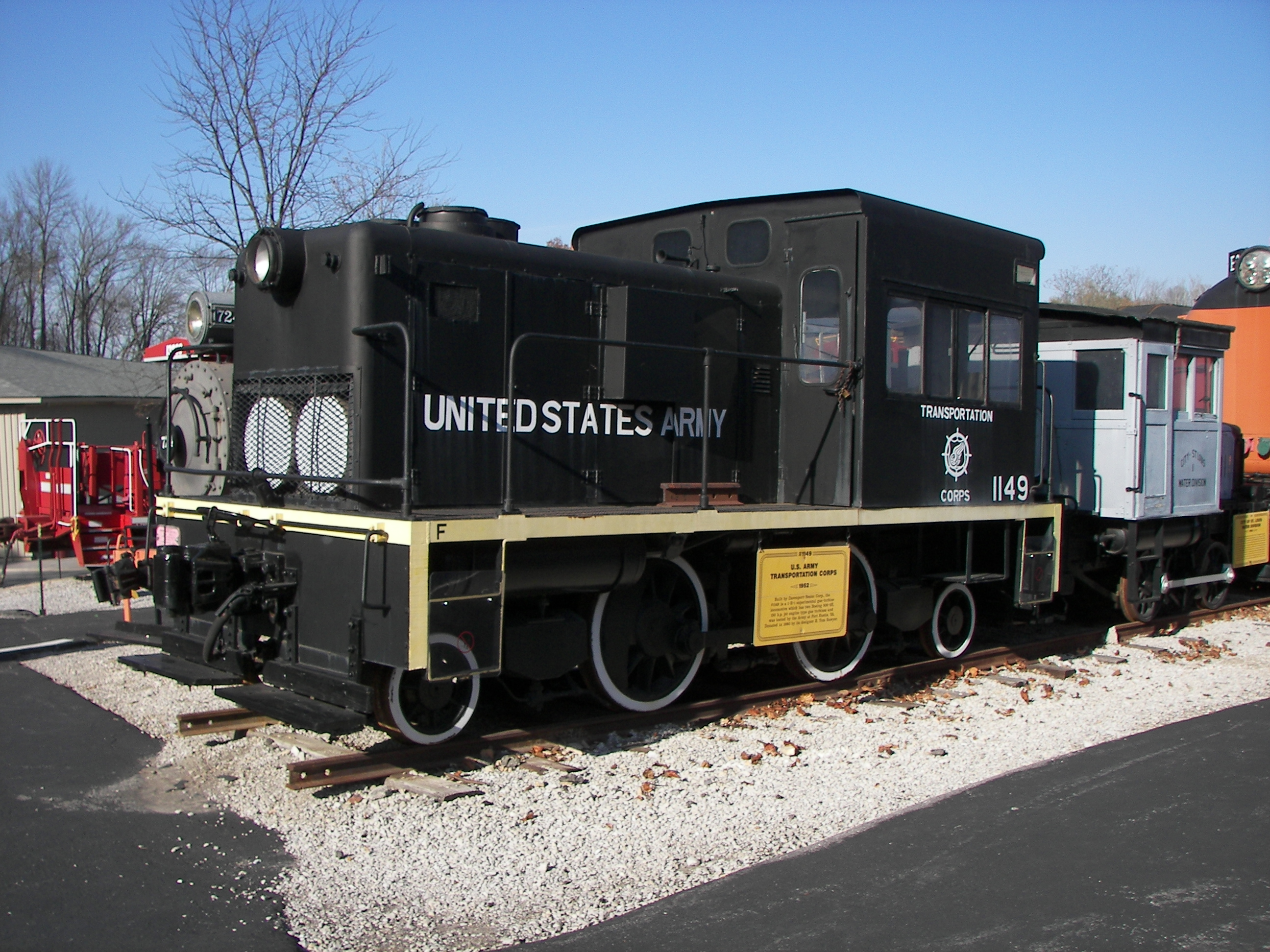
A 44-ton 1-B-1 experimental gas turbine locomotive designed by R. Tom Sawyer and built in 1952 for testing by the U.S. Army Transportation Corps.

A gas turbine locomotive is an internal combustion engine locomotive consisting of a gas turbine. ICE engines require a transmission to power the wheels. The engine must be allowed to continue to run when the locomotive is stopped.

Gas turbine-mechanical locomotives use a mechanical transmission to deliver the power output of gas turbines to the wheels. A gas turbine locomotive was patented in 1861 by Marc Antoine Francois Mennons (British patent no. 1633). There is no evidence that the locomotive was actually built but the design includes the essential features of gas turbine locomotives built in the 20th century, including compressor, combustion chamber, turbine and air pre-heater. In 1952, Renault delivered a prototype four-axle 1,150 hp gas-turbine-mechanical locomotive fitted with the Pescara "free turbine" gas- and compressed-air producing system, rather than a co-axial multi-stage compressor integral to the turbine. This model was succeeded by a pair of six-axle 2,400 hp locomotives with two turbines and Pescara feeds in 1959. Several similar locomotives were built in USSR by Kharkov Locomotive Works.

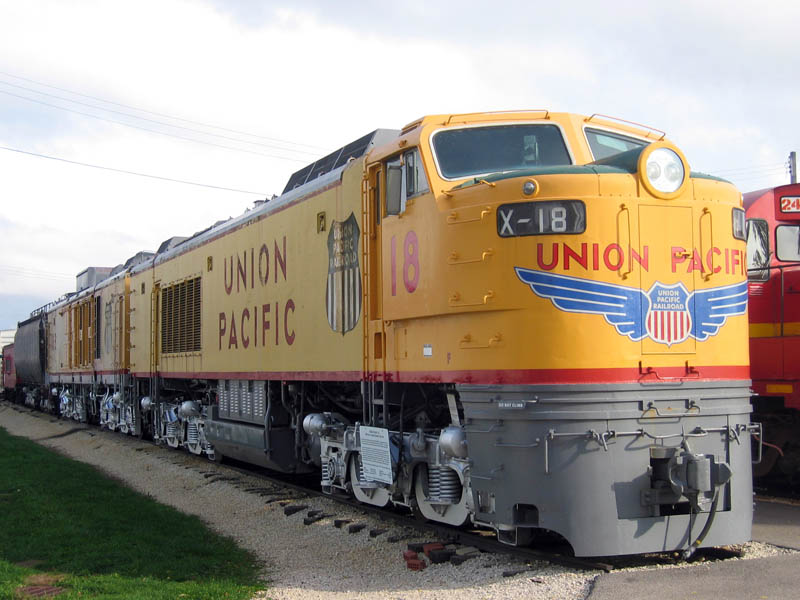
UP 18, a gas turbine-electric locomotive preserved at the Illinois Railway Museum.

Gas turbine-electric locomotives, use a gas turbine to drive an electrical generator or alternator which produced electric current powers the traction motor which drive the wheels. In 1939 the Swiss Federal Railways ordered Am 4/6, a GTEL with a 1,620 kW (2,170 hp) of maximum engine power from Brown Boveri. It was completed in 1941, and then underwent testing before entering regular service. The Am 4/6 was the first gas turbine – electric locomotive. British Rail 18000 was built by Brown Boveri and delivered in 1949. British Rail 18100 was built by Metropolitan-Vickers and delivered in 1951. A third locomotive, the British Rail GT3, was constructed in 1961. Union Pacific ran a large fleet of turbine-powered freight locomotives starting in the 1950s. These were widely used on long-haul routes, and were cost-effective despite their poor fuel economy due to their use of "leftover" fuels from the petroleum industry. At their height the railroad estimated that they powered about 10% of Union Pacific's freight trains, a much wider use than any other example of this class.

A gas turbine offers some advantages over a piston engine. There are few moving parts, decreasing the need for lubrication and potentially reducing maintenance costs, and the power-to-weight ratio is much higher. A turbine of a given power output is also physically smaller than an equally powerful piston engine, allowing a locomotive to be very powerful without being inordinately large. However, a turbine's power output and efficiency both drop dramatically with rotational speed, unlike a piston engine, which has a comparatively flat power curve. This makes GTEL systems useful primarily for long-distance high-speed runs. Additional problems with gas turbine-electric locomotives included that they were very noisy.

=== Wood gas generation ===
Some locomotives, mainly in France and Italy, ran on a wood gas generator.

== Bibliography ==
- Churella, Albert J. (1998). From Steam To Diesel: Managerial Customs and Organizational Capabilities in the Twentieth-Century American Locomotive Industry. Princeton: Princeton University Press. ISBN 978-0-691-02776-0.
- Duffy, Michael C. (2003). Electric Railways 1880–1990. IET. ISBN 978-0-85296-805-5.
- Pinkepank, Jerry A. (1973). The Second Diesel Spotter's Guide. Milwaukee WI: Kalmbach Books. ISBN 978-0-89024-026-7.
