= Catalan Talgo =

International train service

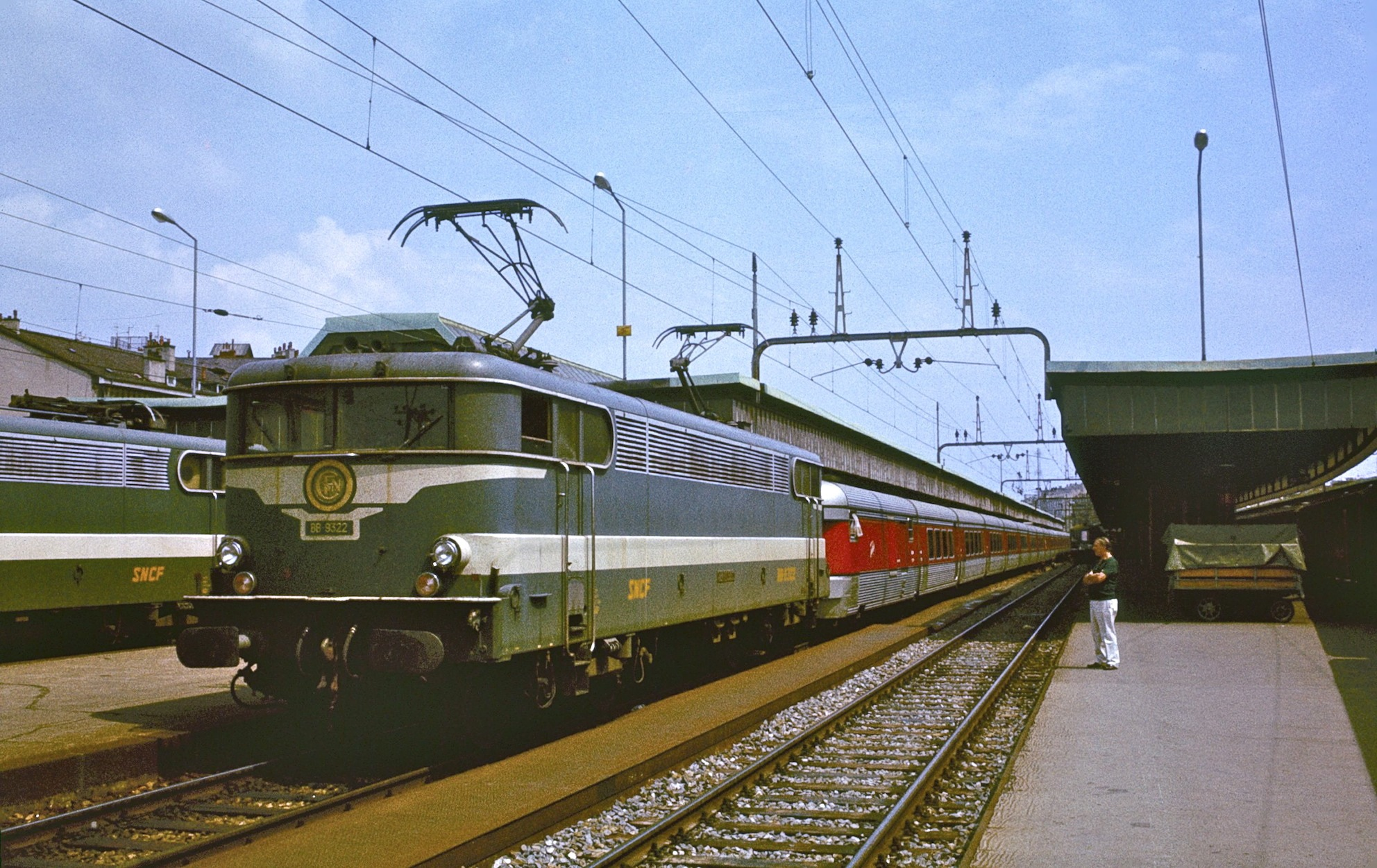
- TEE Catalan Talgo in Geneva, 1979

Overview
- Service type: Trans Europ Express (TEE) (1969–1982); InterCity (IC) (1982–1987); EuroCity (EC) (1987–2010)
- Locale: Spain; France; Switzerland
- Predecessor: Le Catalan
- First service: 1 June 1969
- Last service: 18 December 2010
- Former operators: Renfe; SNCF

Route
- Termini: Barcelona França; Genève-Cornavin

Technical
- Rolling stock: Talgo III Rodadura Desplazable
- Track gauge: 1668 mm (Spain); 1,435 mm (4 ft 8 1/2 in) (France & Switzerland)
- Electrification: 3000 V DC (Spain); 1500 V DC (France & Switzerland)

The Catalan Talgo was an international express train that linked Geneva, Switzerland, with Barcelona, Spain from 1969 to 2010. It was named after the Spanish region Catalonia and the Talgo equipment it used. It was an extension and upgrading of a predecessor train, Le Catalan, a first-class-only French (SNCF) Rapide train that had been in operation since 1955 but running only between Geneva and the stations nearest the Spanish-French border, connecting with a second-class-only "autorail" trainset to and from Barcelona. The national railway network of Spain, Red Nacional de los Ferrocarriles Españoles (RENFE), was using Iberian gauge for all of its main lines, while those of France and Switzerland use standard gauge. As a result of this break-of-gauge, train journeys between Geneva and Barcelona consisted of two separate parts, with travelers having to change from a French to a Spanish train or vice versa at the border—at Portbou (alternatively written as Port Bou) on southbound trains and at Cerbère on northbound trains. In 1968, this was resolved with the introduction of the Talgo III RD trainsets, which featured variable gauge wheelsets. At Portbou station, the wheel spacing of each passenger carriage was adjusted by a gauge changer for the difference in gauge, and passengers no longer had to change trains. After successful test runs, the Catalan was extended from Port Bou to Barcelona as a through train on 1 June 1969, becoming the Catalan Talgo and upgraded to a Trans Europ Express (TEE). Most other rail journeys through this border crossing continued to require a change of train at Cerbère station or at Port Bou, as most trains did not use Talgo III RD trainsets.

== Trans Europ Express ==
=== Rolling stock ===
==== Traction ====
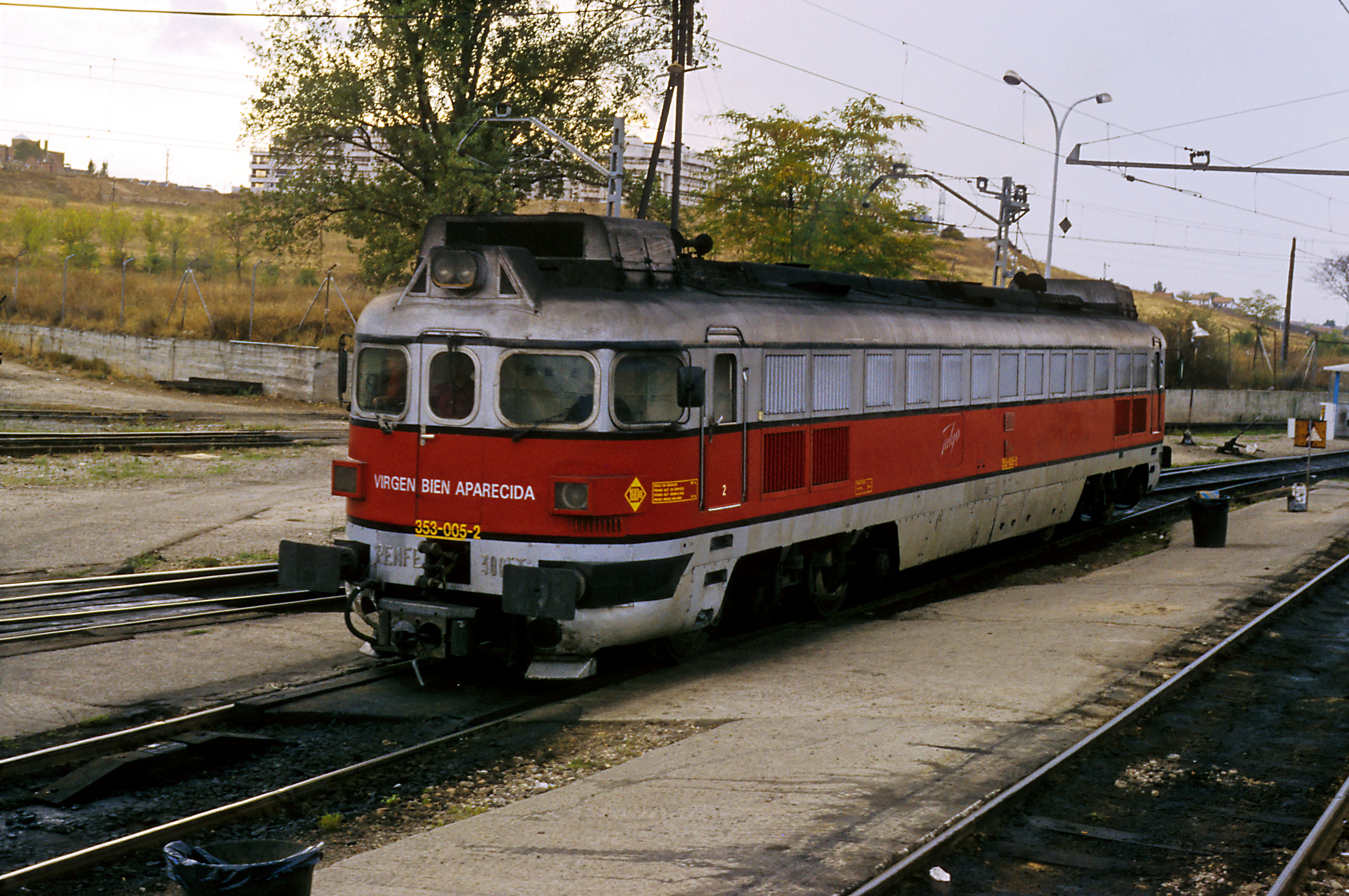
The Spanish TEE locomotive class 353

Initially the Catalan Talgo was hauled by the Renfe class 3000 locomotives, the later class 353. These locomotives were not equipped with adaptable bogies, so the locomotive numbers 3003 and 3004, which had Iberian gauge bogies, worked the section between Barcelona and the French-Spanish border, while the other three locomotives of this series, which had standard gauge bogies, served the section between the French-Spanish border and Geneva. Already in September 1971, the standard gauge locomotives were replaced by class BB 67400 of SNCF. The broad gauge locomotives were replaced shortly after by class 276 of RENFE. In 1975, the route between Geneva and Avignon was changed. Instead of Grenoble the electrified tracks via Lyon were used, allowing the entire Geneva – Narbonne route section to be worked by an SNCF BB 9300 class locomotive. When in early 1980 the route Narbonne – Portbou was electrified as well, the BB 9300 class was replaced by SNCF BB 7200 class.

==== Coaches ====
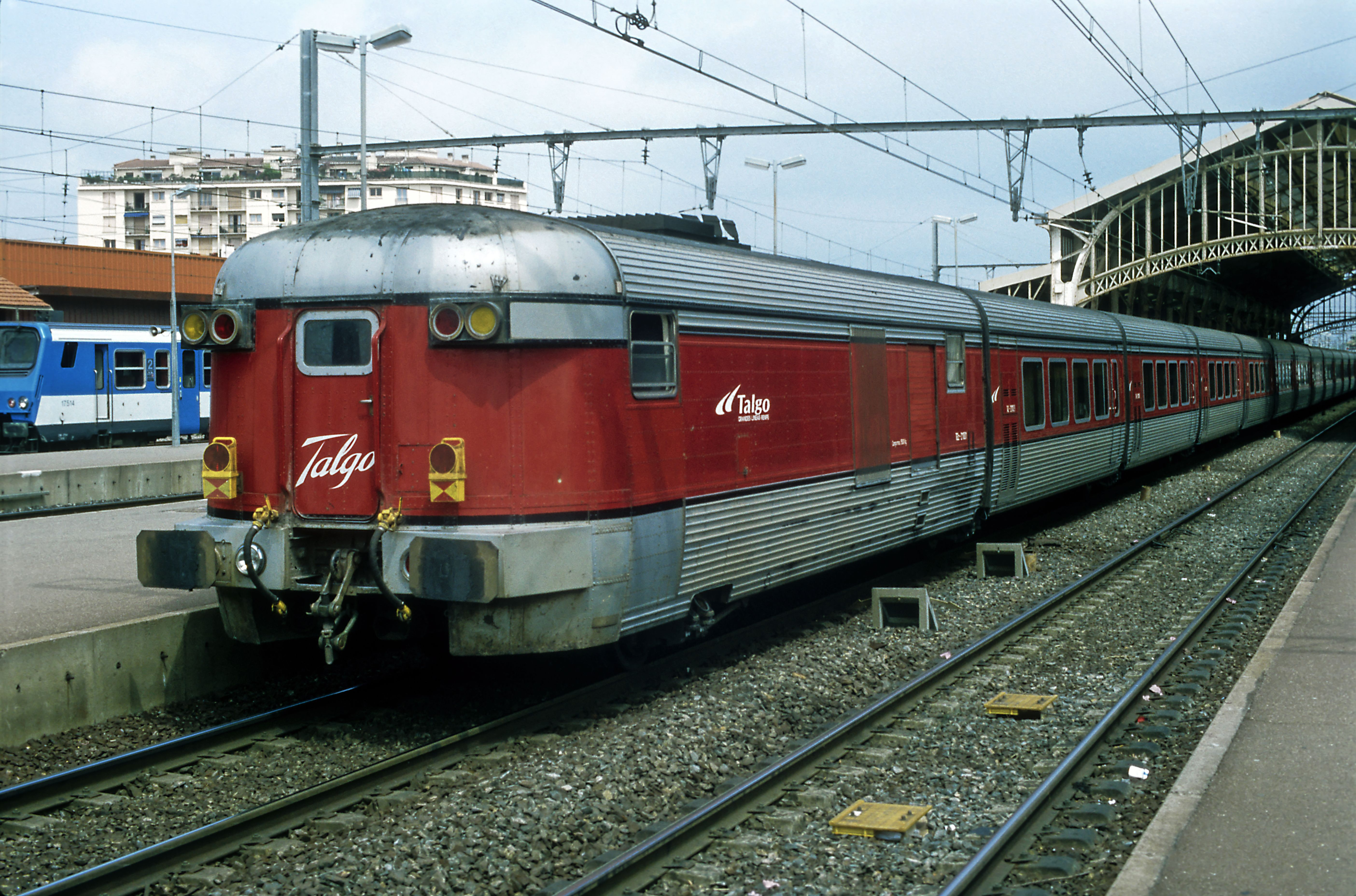
Talgo III RD set in Perpignan, 2003

The coaches are all variants of the type Talgo III RD. These coaches (RT), built in 1968, were deployed until the end of 2010. A generator car, supplying power for the train's electrical system, is located at both ends of the carriages. These generator cars also provide the coupling to the locomotive because the Talgo coupling between the carriages is not compatible with other railway stock. One generator car, the RT 212, houses the train chief's office, while the other, the RT 211, is provided with a luggage compartment. The basic composition of the train consisted, in between the two generator cars, of nine carriages RT 201, one bar/kitchen car RT 206 and two dining cars RT 210. The RT 206 was situated approximately in the middle of the train, flanked by an RT 210 on both sides; the RT 211 formed the Spanish side and the RT 212 the Swiss side of the train. In case of heavy traffic, up to seven RT 201 could be added, so a train of 21 carriages, each 11.5 m long, could be formed. After the introduction of the RT 202 second-class carriages in 1982, which were conveyed between the RT 206 and RT 212, the RT 210 on that side of the RT 206 was removed.

=== Route and timetable ===
In 1969, the TEE service started with the Swiss designation CG, GC (Catalunya-Genève and v.v.) and the Spanish train numbers TEE 83,84. On 23 May 1971, the train was renumbered to TEE 70/71 – TEE 72/73; in Spain the numbers TEE 73,70 were used, from 26 May 1974 TEE 5073,5070. The double numbering is due to the fact that, in both terminals, outbound trains are given an odd number and incoming an even number. The original route was: Barcelona – Girona – Portbou – Cerbère – Perpignan – Narbonne – Béziers – Sete – Montpellier – Nîmes – Avignon – Valence – Romans Bourg de Péage – Grenoble – Challes les Eaux – Chambéry – Aix les Bains Le Revard – Culoz – Bellegarde – Geneva-Cornavin. On 31 May 1970, the stops at Romans Bourg de Péage and Sète were removed from the timetable.

TEE Catalan Talgo (blue) and the connecting TEE Ligure (red)

GC (70/71)	country	station	km	CG (72/73)
10:40	Switzerland	Geneva Cornavin	0	7:38 pm
11:09	France	Bellegarde	33	7:08 pm
11:33	France	Culoz	66	6:39 pm
11:55	France	Aix-les-Bains	88	6:21 pm
12:09	France	Chambéry	102	6:08 pm
12:52	France	Grenoble	165	5:28 pm
1:55 pm	France	Valence	262	4:21 pm
3:03 pm	France	Avignon	387	3:15 pm
3:32 pm	France	Nîmes	436	2:45 pm
3:59 pm	France	Montpellier	486	2:15 pm
4:42 pm	France	Béziers	557	1:33 pm
5:00 pm	France	Narbonne	583	1:16 pm
6:01 pm	France	Cerbere	688	12:14
6:25 pm	Spain	Port Bou	690	11:49
8:39 pm	Spain	Barcelona	864	9:45

The schedule was designed to provide easy passenger connections to and from the TEE Ligure in Avignon. The TEE Catalan Talgo services, in both directions, called at Avignon just after the arrival of the TEE Ligure from Milan and before departure of the TEE Ligure to Milan. This allowed the travelers to change between the two TEE services at around 3 pm. On 28 September 1975, at the urging of SBB and RENFE, the route between Valence and Bellegarde was modified, so between Narbonne and Geneva a through electric service could be implemented. The only stop between Bellegarde and Valence was Lyon-Brotteaux (today Lyon Part-Dieu). This was a technical stop only, without passengers boarding or leaving the train. Although this route was one kilometer longer, the total travel time was shortened by almost 40 minutes. A costly side-effect of this change was that an extra train between Geneva and Grenoble had to be operated. In 1982, hoping to attract more passengers, RENFE added second-class carriages to the train formation. As a result, the TEE requirement of first-class-only cars was no longer met, and the Catalan Talgo was downgraded to a normal Intercity service.

== EuroCity ==
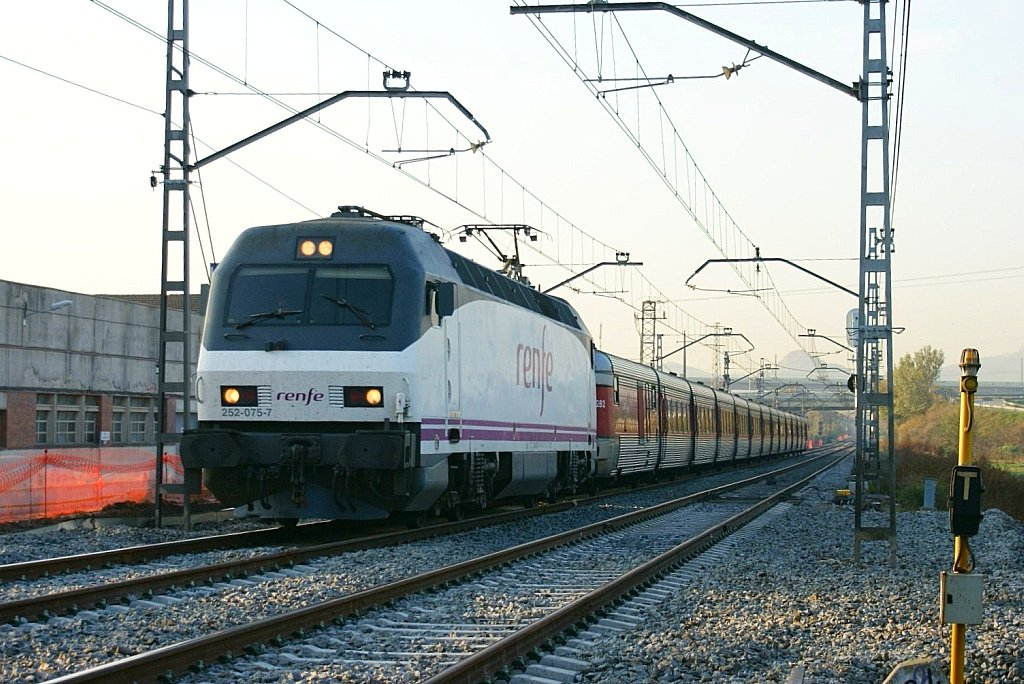
Barcelona–Cerbère railway: Locomotive 252.075 with the Catalan Talgo in Mollet del Vallès (Spain)

In 1987, the Catalan Talgo became part of the then-new EuroCity network. In the fall of 1994, with the introduction of TGV services from Paris and Geneva to Montpellier, the Catalan Talgo was shortened to the Montpellier – Barcelona part. The TGV high-speed line was extended to Barcelona in December 2013. The Catalan Talgo was taken out of service in December 2010.

== Works cited ==
- Werbeamt der DB (1971). Vorfahrt in Europa, TEE 1971/72 (in German). Frankfurt am Main: Deutsche Bundesbahn.
- UIC (1972). TEE (in Dutch). Paris: Union International des Chemins de Fer.
- Hajt, Jörg (2001). Das grosse TEE Buch (in German). Bonn/Königswinter: Heel Verlag. ISBN 3-89365-948-X.
- Dell'Amico, Franco (2005). Il TEE Breda (in Italian). Savona: ACME.
- Goette, Peter; Willen, Peter (2006). TEE-Züge in der Schweiz und schweizer TEE-Züge im Ausland (in German). Fribourg: EK-Verlag. ISBN 978-3-88255-697-1.
- Mertens, Maurice; Malaspina, Jean-Pierre (2007). La Légende des Trans Europ Express (in French). Vannes: LR Presse. ISBN 978-29-036514-5-9.
- Eruste, Manuel Galan; López-Luzzatti, Miguel Cano (2010). De un sueño a la alta velocidad (in Spanish). Las Matas: Patentes Talgo. ISBN 978-8493286-1-87.
