= Renfe Class 354 =

Class of Spanish diesel-hydraulic locomotive

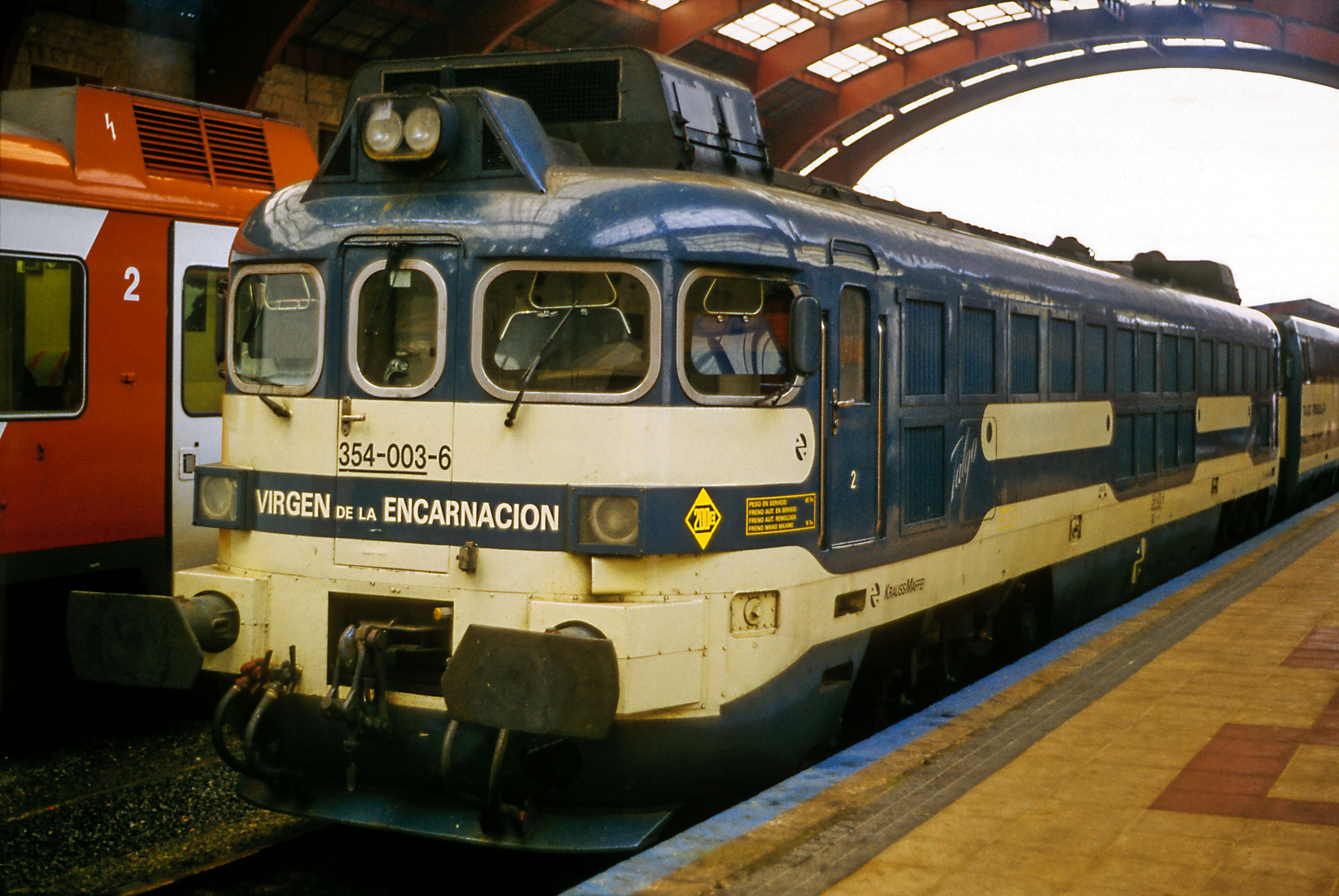
- 354.003 Virgen de la Encarnación
Type and origin
- Power type: Diesel-hydraulic
- Designer: Krauss-Maffei
- Builder: Krauss-Maffei
- Serial number: 354-001 to 354-008
- Build date: 1983/1984
- Total produced: 8
- Rebuild date: ?
- Number rebuilt: 8
Specifications
- Configuration
  - UIC: B'B'
- Gauge: 1,668 mm (5 ft 5 21/32 in)
- Length: 19.92 m (65 ft 4 1/4 in)
- Width: 3.04 m (9 ft 11 11/16 in)
- Height: 3.45 m (11 ft 3 13/16 in)
- Loco weight: 80 t (79 long tons; 88 short tons)
- Fuel capacity: 4,000 L (880 imp gal; 1,100 US gal)
- Prime mover: 2 x MTU 396 TD 13
- Engine type: V16
- Cylinders: 2 x 16
- Transmission: 2 x Voith L 520 rz U2 Hydraulic
- MU working: No
- Safety systems: ASFA
Performance figures
- Maximum speed: service : 180 km/h (110 mph) top speed : 200 km/h (125 mph)
- Power output: 2 x 1,535 kW (2,058 hp; 2,087 PS) UIC = 3,070 kW (4,117 hp; 4,174 PS)
Career
- Operators: Renfe
- Nicknames: Talgas
- Locale: Spain
- Delivered: 1983

The Renfe Class 354 was a series of eight diesel hydraulic locomotives manufactured by Krauss-Maffei in Germany specifically to pull Talgo pendular coaches, which were introduced shortly before the acquisition of these machines.

The appearance and design is very similar to the Renfe Class 353, but with improvements; specifically in terms of installed power.

== Background and design ==
Delivered between 1983 and 1984, these engines provide a total power of 4,171 hp (3,110 kW), a figure never before reached by any other Spanish locomotive (Note: The Renfe Class 340 (also a twin engine/transmission Krauss-Maffei machine) with 4,000 hp (3,000 kW) was nearly as powerful.) The units have two cabins, like the predecessor Class 353, the twin-engined / twin hydraulic transmission design from Krauss-Maffei can be traced back in Spain to the single cabined Renfe Class 352 and the Renfe Class 340, and further back to the DB Class V 200 of the Deutsche Bundesbahn.

The locomotives represent a steadily increasing requirement for engine power, from the Class 352, to the Class 353, and then to these engines, with over 800 hp more power. Such high power was needed to drag the new Talgo tilting trains, which thanks to their natural pendulation system can be used with higher lateral acceleration than conventional trains, passing through curves at up to 25% faster. With these locomotives a maximum speed of this train was originally 180 km/h (110 mph). Later in July 1986 a simple change of gearing and the fitting of the 'ASFA 200' safety system enabled the maximum speed of these locomotives to be raised up to 200 km/h (125 mph).

The only other diesel locomotive in Renfe's fleet with a maximum speed of 200 km/h (125 mph) is the more recent diesel electric Renfe Class 334 (as of 2009) however this locomotive has a lower engine power, further reduced by the requirement to provide an electrical supply for the carriages, (Note: The Class 354 has no auxiliary generator for train supply, auxiliary generators being provided in parts of the Talgo pendular units themselves.) giving it a disappointing acceleration performance in comparison.

Initially, they were delivered in the same livery as the Talgo pendular, i.e. white and blue. Later they received the Grandes Lineas livery, also based on white and blue, (in July 1998 354-003 was the first to receive it). In 2004 the logo 'Talgo' was removed from the sides of the locomotives - a minor change.

The class later received improvements such as sound-proofing of the cabin and air conditioning equipment (fitted on the roof).

== Operations ==
The first unit arrived in 1982 and was tested on the lines of Madrid–Collado Villalba, Madrid–Almería, Madrid–El Goloso and Madrid–Alcázar de San Juan. The machines were assigned to the depot at Madrid-Aravaca.

Initially the units worked on the Talgo pendular Madrid–A Coruña and alongside the Class 353 on the Talgo pendular Madrid–Paris (at far as the gauge change at Irún). From 25 May 1983: the beginning of the summer service they were also used to pull the Talgo pendular Madrid–Cádiz replacing the electric Japanese Renfe Class 269 which had experienced difficulties due to a non-compensated overhead lines.

Tests conducted with 354-002 and 354-003 between Seville and Jerez de la Frontera had achieved a speed of 160 kilometres per hour (99 mph) without encountering any significant problems. However breakdowns of the hydraulic transmissions occur, whilst some units still being in production at the Krauss-Maffei factory in Munich; the unfinished units have the problem corrected before being delivered.

When the eight units became redundant on the Talgo Pendular they were used on conventional trains fitted with a generator van of type "DDT 9450". On 20 February 1984, they replaced the 333.0 on the Extremadura Expreso (Madrid–Badajoz), on 3 June they also began to be used on the Rias Altas Express (Madrid–A Coruña). These services ceased in 1986. Next they were to be seen working the Lusitania expreso between Madrid and Talavera de la Reina.

In 1986, the machines were upgraded for 200 km/h operations making them the fastest in Spain at that time. In 1988, when Renfe decided to reduce the maximum speed, the Japanese designed locomotives to 140 km/h, with the Class 354 and the Renfe Class 250 becoming the only machines that can to ensure operations at 160 km/h.

In 1989, a study was undertaken to convert them to normal operations, but did not proceed very far.

In 1990, they started to work the TALGO train: Madrid–Gijón. 1993 sees them replacing Class 353 units on the Talgo Mare nostrum between Valencia and Cartagena. The same year sees 354-008 out of commercial service and being used to conduct further high speed tests on the new Madrid - Seville line, the unit returned to commercial service in November of that year. An accident in May 1995 means the same unit will be out of action for a year.

The turn of the century brings a series of serious accidents:

- 4 October 2001, 354-001 catches fire.
- 3 June 2003, 354-007 is completely destroyed in collision with the 333-304.
- 21 May 2004, a head-on collision on Talgo Madrid–Pontevedra–A Coruña line completely destroys 354-002 and 354-003.
- 4 January, 353-004 derails at Tobarra, requiring repairs.

At the end of this black series of events the three remaining locomotives are confined to the Talgo pendular between Madrid and Badajoz, and Madrid and Cartagena.

== Fleet details ==
Like all Talgo locomotives, the Class 354 received names

Renfe Number UIC	Name	Manufacturer	Manufacturer's number	Built	Retired
354-001-0	Virgen de Covadonga	Krauss-Maffei	19904	1982	2009
354-002-8	Virgen de la Macarena	Krauss-Maffei	19905	1983	2004
354-003-6	Virgen de la Encarnación	Krauss-Maffei	19906	1983	2004
354-004-4	Virgen de Guadalupe	Krauss-Maffei	19907	1983	2003
354-005-1	Virgen del Pilar	Krauss-Maffei	19908	1983	2001
354-006-9	Virgen de Aranzazu	Krauss-Maffei	19909	1984	2009
354-007-7	Virgen de Begoña	Krauss-Maffei	19910	1984	2003
354-008-5	Virgen de Montserrat	Krauss-Maffei	19911	1984	2009

== See also ==
- Renfe Class 352, Renfe Class 353 - predecessor classes, also designed primarily for use with Talgo carriages.

== Literature ==
- Galan Eruste, Manuel (January 2005). "Talgo, unas maquinas desafortunadas". Maquetren. No. 143.
- Salmeron i Bosch, Carles (1985). Las locomotoras de España. Barcelona: Editorial Terminus.
