= Daimler Paraffin Railway =

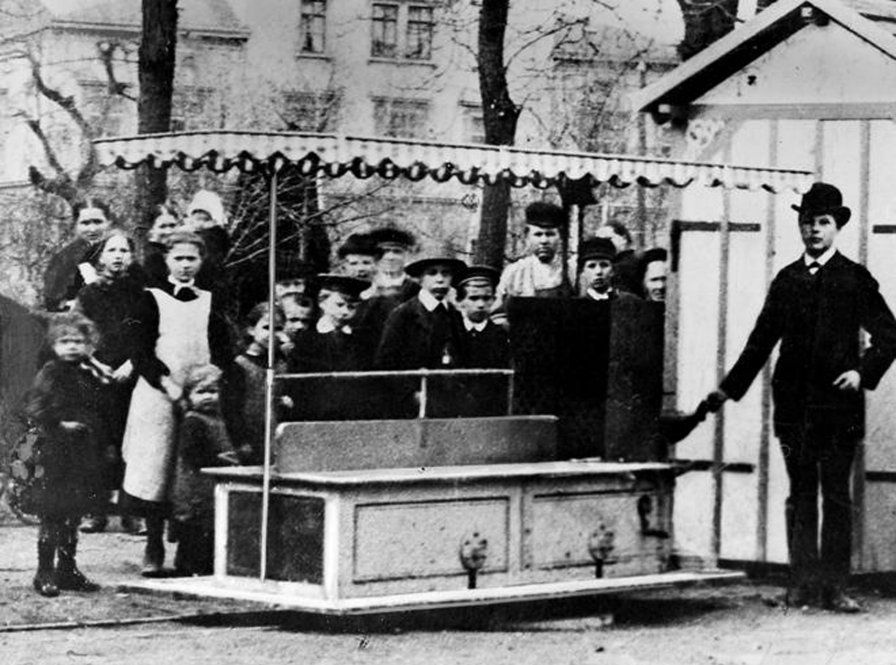
Daimler Motor-Waggonet, 1887

The Daimler Paraffin Railway was a railway on which the first internal combustion locomotive ran. Three original vehicles for passenger and goods transport are exhibited in the Mercedes-Benz Museum in Stuttgart.

== History ==
=== Motor-Draisine ===
In 1887, the pioneer of the German automotive industry, Gottlieb Daimler, developed a motor-driven draisine, which used paraffin (kerosene) as fuel. It was the first piece of rolling stock with an internal combustion engine. It was successfully tested in summer 1887 between Esslingen and Kirchheim/Teck.

Motor-Draisine of 1893 in the Mercedes-Benz Museum	Technical Data	Motor-Draisine being tested in summer 1887 between Esslingen and Kirchheim/Teck
	• Cylinder: 1 • Volume: 462 cm³ • Power: 1,1 hp (0,8 kW) at 650 rev/min • Max. speed: 20 km/h (12½ mph) • Seats: 4	

=== Motor-Waggonet ===
In 1887 Gottlieb Daimler demonstrated a paraffin driven narrow gauge train on the Cannstatter Volksfest. It was well received as a convenient means of passenger transport between Wilhelmsplatz and Kursaal. Starting in 1890, he sold an improved variant under the Waggonet trademark. The high-speed two piston V engine delivered 2 horsepower (1.5 kW) and could propel the nearly 700 kilograms (1,500 lb) vehicle at speeds of up to 20 kilometres per hour (12 mph). On each side, there was a bench with six seats. The driver sat on a saddle behind the upright motor, which was installed in a box.

The Farming and Foresting Exhibition was held in Vienna from 14 May to 30 October 1890. The organisers wanted to provide easy access for the attendees. The entrepreneur Josef Bierenz installed and operated a narrow gauge passenger tramway using Daimler Waggonets from the Praterstern the western entrance of the fair centre at Rotunderplatz. It was used all summer and transported thousands of passengers. Each train consisted of a Waggonet and a trailer and offered space for 24 passengers. One vehicle is preserved in the archive of the Vienna Technical Museum but currently not being exhibited.

Motor-Waggonet of 1891 in the Mercedes-Benz Museum	Technical Data	Daimler Paraffin Railway, 1890
	• Cylinders: V2 • Volume: 1026 cm³ • Power: 2 hp (1,5 kW) at 620 rev/min • Max. speed: 20 km/h (12½ mph) • Seats: 10	

=== Motor Locomotive ===
The narrow gauge Daimler Motor Locomotive was a more powerful 4.6 horsepower (3.4 kW) variant. The original displayed at the Mercedes Museum was used up to 1918 as an industrial locomotive.

Daimler Motor-Locomotive of 1893 in the Mercedes-Benz-Museum	Technical Data	Daimler Motor-Locomotive of 1893 in the Mercedes-Benz-Museum
	• Cylinder: V2 • Volume: 1902 cm³ • Power: 4,6 hp (3,4 kW) at 580 rev/min • Max. speed: 16 km/h (10 mph)	

== See also ==
- Petrol-paraffin engine
