= Renfe Class 350 =

Spanish diesel locomotive class

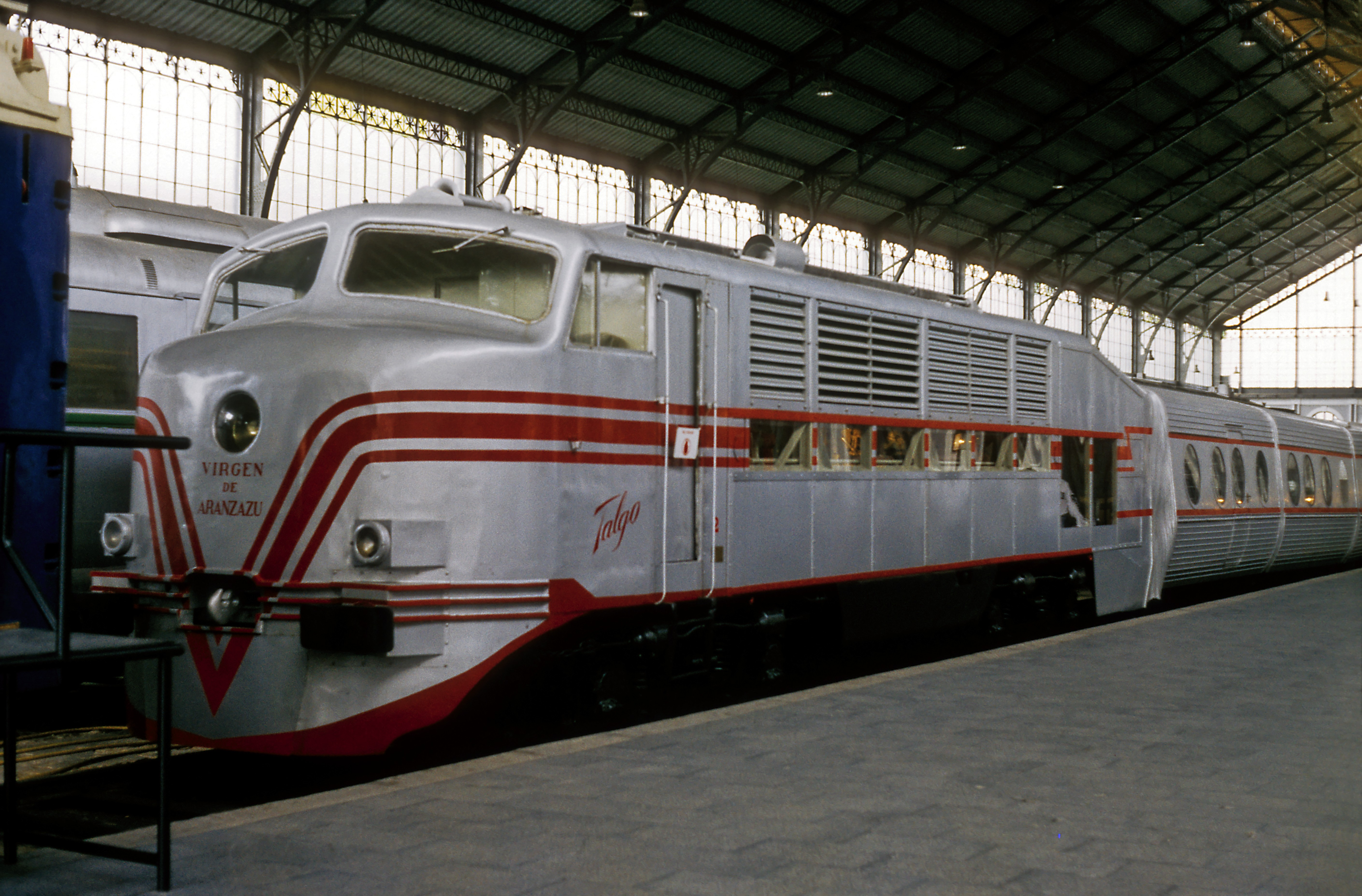
- 350-002 "Virgin of Aranzazu"
Type and origin
- Power type: Diesel
- Builder: American Car & Foundry
- Serial number: 350-001 to 350-004
- Build date: 1949
- Total produced: 4
Specifications
- Configuration
  - UIC: B'B'
- Gauge: 1,668 mm (5 ft 5 21/32 in)
- Wheel diameter: 840 mm (33.07 in)
- Wheelbase: 9.5 m (31 ft 2.0 in) (bogie centres)
- Loco weight: 60 t (59 long tons; 66 short tons)
- Prime mover: 2 x Maybach MD-320 (units 001-003); 2 x Hercules Nª4 tipo DNX-V8DS (unit 004)
Performance figures
- Maximum speed: 140 km/h (87 mph)
Career
- Operators: Renfe
- Locale: Spain
- First run: 1949-1952

The Renfe Class 350 is a series of four single-cabin diesel locomotives that were delivered to Spain in 1950 for use with Talgo II coaches, being built in the United States by the American Car & Foundry to a distinctly American external style.

== Operations ==
The locomotives worked passenger services with Talgo II coaches in red lined silver Talgo II livery, starting in 1950 between Madrid and Hendaye and ending in 1972 with trains between Madrid and Palencia.

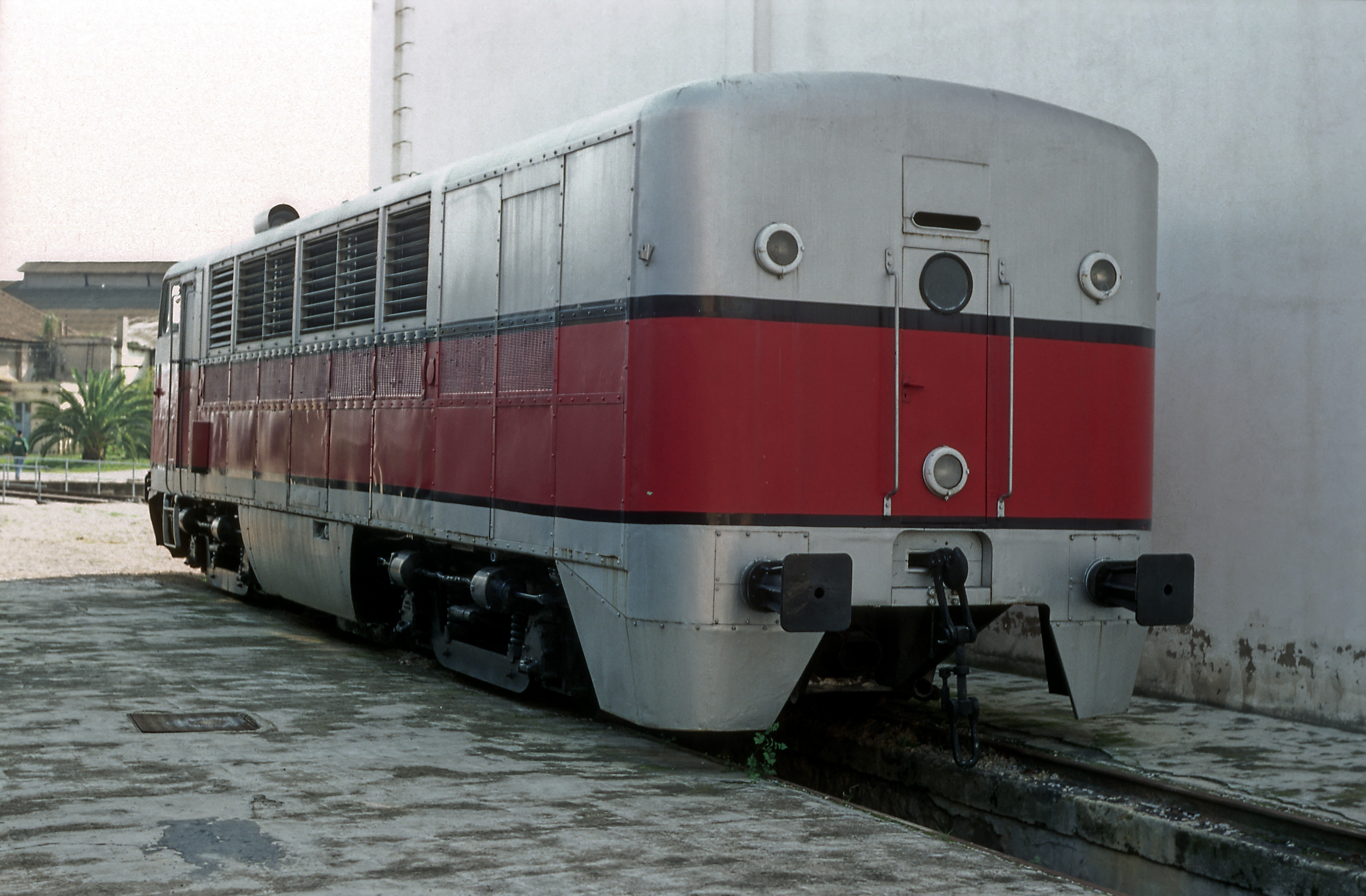
Rear of 350–003 in later Talgo III livery carried from 1972 to 1976

When the Talgo II coaches were withdrawn the locomotives were formed into two pairs, and worked Talgo III services between Madrid and Bilbao on the Miranda de Ebro-Bilbao until 1976 when that service was taken over by Renfe Class 269 locomotives.

== Fleet details ==
Like all Talgo locomotives, the Class 350 received names.

Renfe Number	Name	Fate
350-001	Virgen del Pilar	Decommissioned
354-002	Virgen de Aránzazu	Preserved, on display at Madrid-Delicias railway Museum
354-003	Virgen de Begoña	Preserved, on display Vilanova (Barcelona)
354-004	Virgen de Montserrat	Decommissioned
