= Renfe Class 352 =

Spanish diesel locomotive class

Renfe Class 352 2000-T
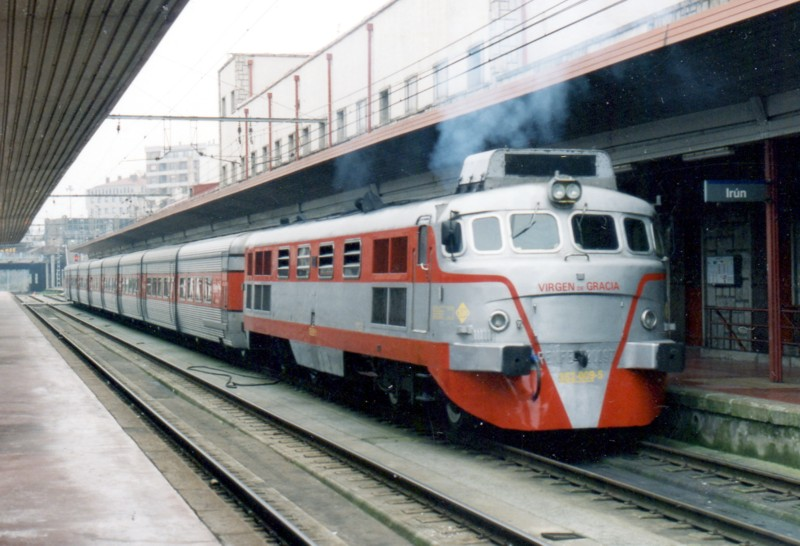
- Renfe 352 009
Type and origin
- Power type: Diesel-hydraulic
- Designer: Krauss-Maffei
- Builder: Krauss-Maffei; Babcock & Wilcox (under license)
- Serial number: originally 2001 T to 2010 T later 352-001 to 352-010
- Build date: 1964/1965
- Total produced: 10
Specifications
- Configuration
  - UIC: B'B'
- Gauge: 1,668 mm (5 ft 5 21/32 in)
- Length: 17.45 m (57 ft 3 in)
- Width: 3.2 m (10 ft 6 in)
- Height: 3.29 m (10 ft 10 in)
- Loco weight: 74 t (73 long tons; 82 short tons)
- Fuel capacity: 3,600 L (790 imp gal; 950 US gal)
- Prime mover: 2 Maybach MD 650 1B
- Transmission: Hydraulic 2 Maybach K 104 U
- MU working: No
- Safety systems: ASFA
Performance figures
- Maximum speed: 140 km/h (87 mph); 160 km/h (99 mph) (allowed in 1986) 230 km/h (140 mph) (testing)
- Power output: 2,400 hp (1,800 kW) (2 x 1,200 hp (890 kW))
Career
- Operators: Renfe
- Locale: Spain

The Renfe Class 352 (formerly 2000-T) was a class of twin engined four axle diesel-hydraulic locomotives built by Krauss-Maffei, designed solely for passenger traffic; in particular they were responsible for towing Andalusian Talgo III trains. The class were very successful, heralding a new era of passenger trains in Spain. They were delivered in 1964 and 1965, and were fully withdrawn during the 1990s.

== Background and design ==
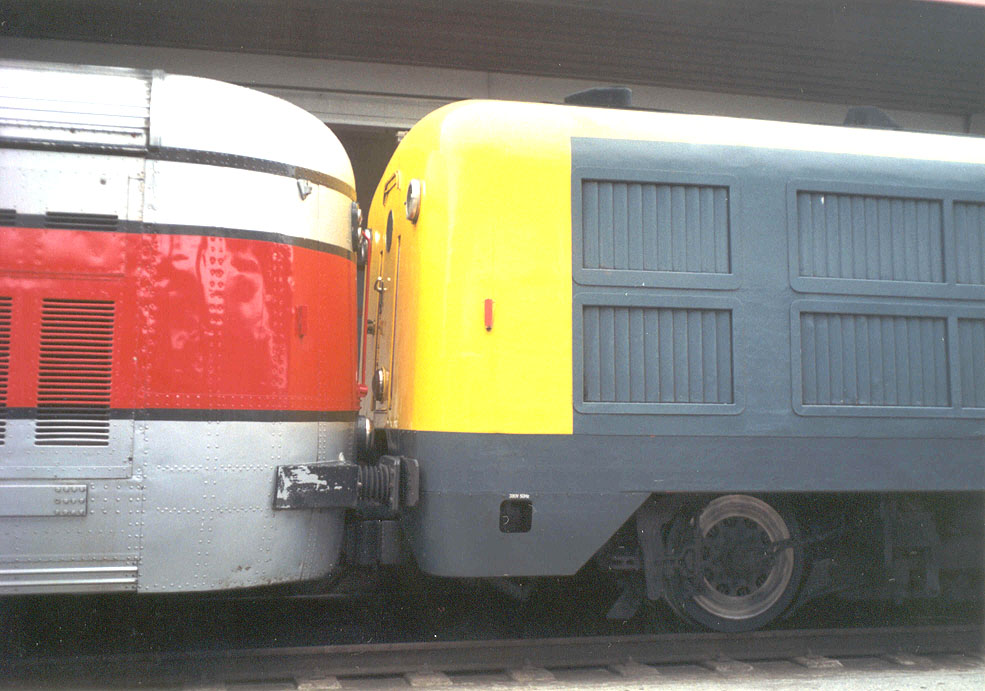
Cabless rear end of a Class 352 (right) in 'taxi' livery, coupled to a Talgo unit (left)

With the Talgo II coaches having proved successful, and a new class of coaches—the Talgo III being introduced in the early 1960s—a new type of express locomotive was required to pull them. On 28 May 1962, the Board of Directors of Renfe placed an order for the locomotives needed, and the 2000-T series was born.

Unlike the fixed formation Talgo II trains, the Talgo III was to have a locomotive which was separable from the coaches. Five locomotives were initially built by Krauss-Maffei, who gave the locomotives the internal designation ML 2400; in Spain they are placed in the class 2000-T. The Krauss-Maffei design was chosen since no other manufacturer offered similar power in the reduced height, and low centre of gravity that matches the Talgo trainsets, the internal design was very similar to the DB Class V 200.0 with the same engine and hydraulic drive, and similar bogies, though the exterior, and gauge are totally different. A further five locomotives were then built by Babcock & Wilcox under license.

Being designed solely in order to pull Talgo III trains they had only one cab, an automatic Scharfenberg coupler, buffers specially adapted, and the necessary auxiliary power supply equipment. Each locomotive had two engines, each with its own transmission The two twelve cylinder engines each developed 1,200 horsepower (890 kW) and initially travelled at a maximum speed of 140 kilometres per hour (87 mph), a high speed for the time. In 1986 the maximum line speed limit was increased by Renfe to 160 km/h (99 mph).

Upon delivery of the 2000 T the trains were tested using wagons from Transfesa, which were available at the time. At delivery and decommissioning they carried a red and silver livery, like all locomotives for the Talgo service, they were given names.

Initially the locomotives had a 'wrap around' windscreen, in the 1980s they were refurbished with the windscreen replaced as part of a cab upgrade and an air conditioner was fitted on the roof at the same time.

== Operations ==
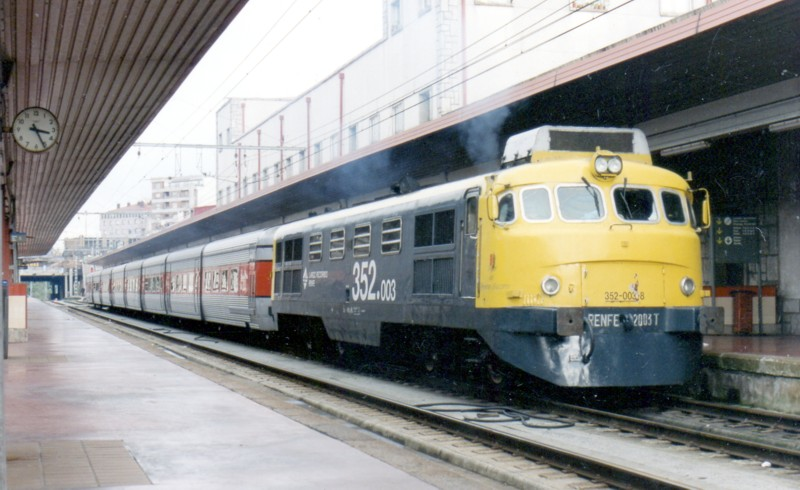
Class 352 in 'taxi' livery, the box on the roof is the air conditioning. The locomotive carries both the numbers 352-003 and 2003T

Upon delivery, all were assigned to Aravaca.

The first arrivals were assigned to Talgo services from Barcelona to Madrid from 20 August 1964. Hendaye, Bilbao and Seville were also destinations served, at the time they were the fastest machines of the Spanish Railways: On June 7, 1966, 2005T reached a speed of 230 km/h (140 mph) between Sevilla and Los Rosales.

Electrification, and the introduction in the 1970s of the Japanese Renfe Class 269 displaced the locomotives onto non electrified lines. From then on Class 352 were used on non-electrified lines such as Badajoz - Lisbon, Granada - Almeria, Murcia - Cartagena.

In 1980 352-004 was altered in order to tow the new Talgo pendular trains; working between Zaragoza and Madrid from June 1980. Later on it was used on Talgo pendular trains between Madrid and Cartagena.

Between September 1995 to April 1996, 352-004 was used on the Talgo pendular Madrid - Cartagena replacing the damaged 354-008.

The locomotives started to be decommissioned at the turn of the century - with machines requiring major work being removed rather than repaired. In time the last of the class to cease work was 312-001 (which was also the first delivered) was withdrawn in 2002 having given 38 years of service with over 7 million kilometers travelled.

== Names and fleet details ==
Original number	UIC number	Name	Constructer	constructor number	Year	Withdrawn	Kilometers worked
2001 T	352-001-2	"Virgen del Rosario"	Krauss-Maffei	19094	1964	22/04/2002	7443836
2002 T	352-002-0	"Virgen Peregrina"	Krauss-Maffei	19095	1964	27/04/1993	5416678
2003 T	352-003-8	"Virgen del Perpetuo Socorro"	Krauss-Maffei	19096	1964	8/06/2001	7253459
2004 T	352-004-6	"Virgen del Camino"	Krauss-Maffei	19097	1964	21/12/1997	6262292
2005 T	352-005-3	"Virgen del Carmen"	Krauss-Maffei	19098	1964	28/06/1998	6873765
2006 T	352-006-1	"Virgen Santa Maria"	Babcock & Wilcox	888	1965	9/07/1999	6846166
2007 T	352-007-9	"Virgen de la Almudena"	Babcock & Wilcox	889	1965	27/02/1993	5543765
2008 T	352-008-7	"Virgen de la Soledad"	Babcock & Wilcox	890	1965	19/05/2002	7144582
2009 T	352-009-5	"Virgen de Gracia"	Babcock & Wilcox	891	1965	20/05/2002	7405093
2010 T	352-010-3	"Virgen de los Reyes"	Babcock & Wilcox	892	1965	23/10/1994	5948783

== After withdrawal ==
352-009 is preserved under the National Museum of the railways.

The front cabin of 352-005 is on display at the railway museum Museu del Ferrocarril of Vilanova, whilst the front of 352-001 was given to the railway museum of Arganda. The control panel of one Class 352 is also kept in the museum of Délicias.

== See also ==
- Renfe Class 353, Renfe Class 354 - subsequent faster and more powerful locomotives built to a very similar design by Krauss-Maffei.

== Literature ==
- Casas Juan Carlos : Locomotoras diesel 352 y 353. in Via Libre n° 483, 02/2005
- Salmeron i Bosch, Carles : Las locomotoras de España. Editorial Terminus, Barcelona, 1985
