= Eugène Brillié =

French engineer (1863–1940)

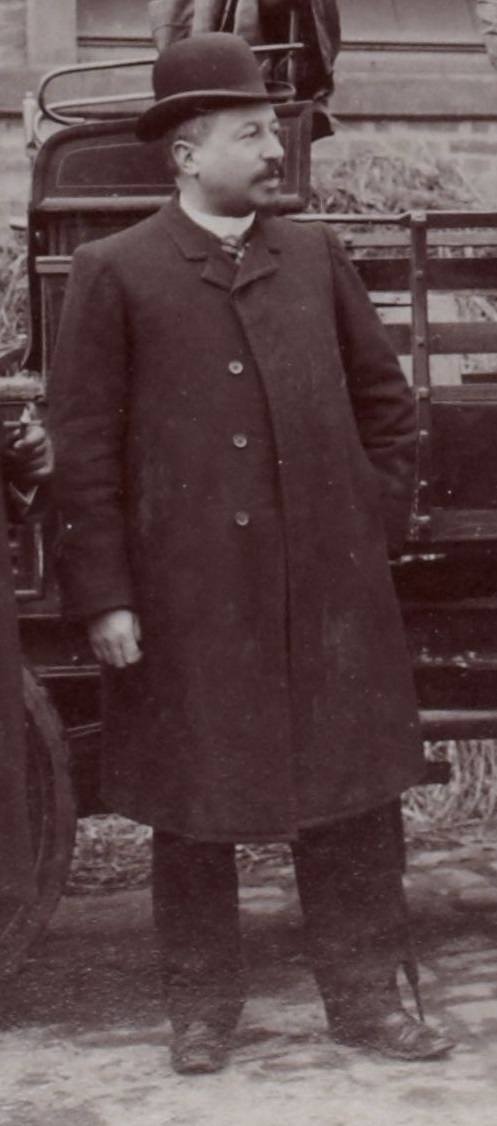

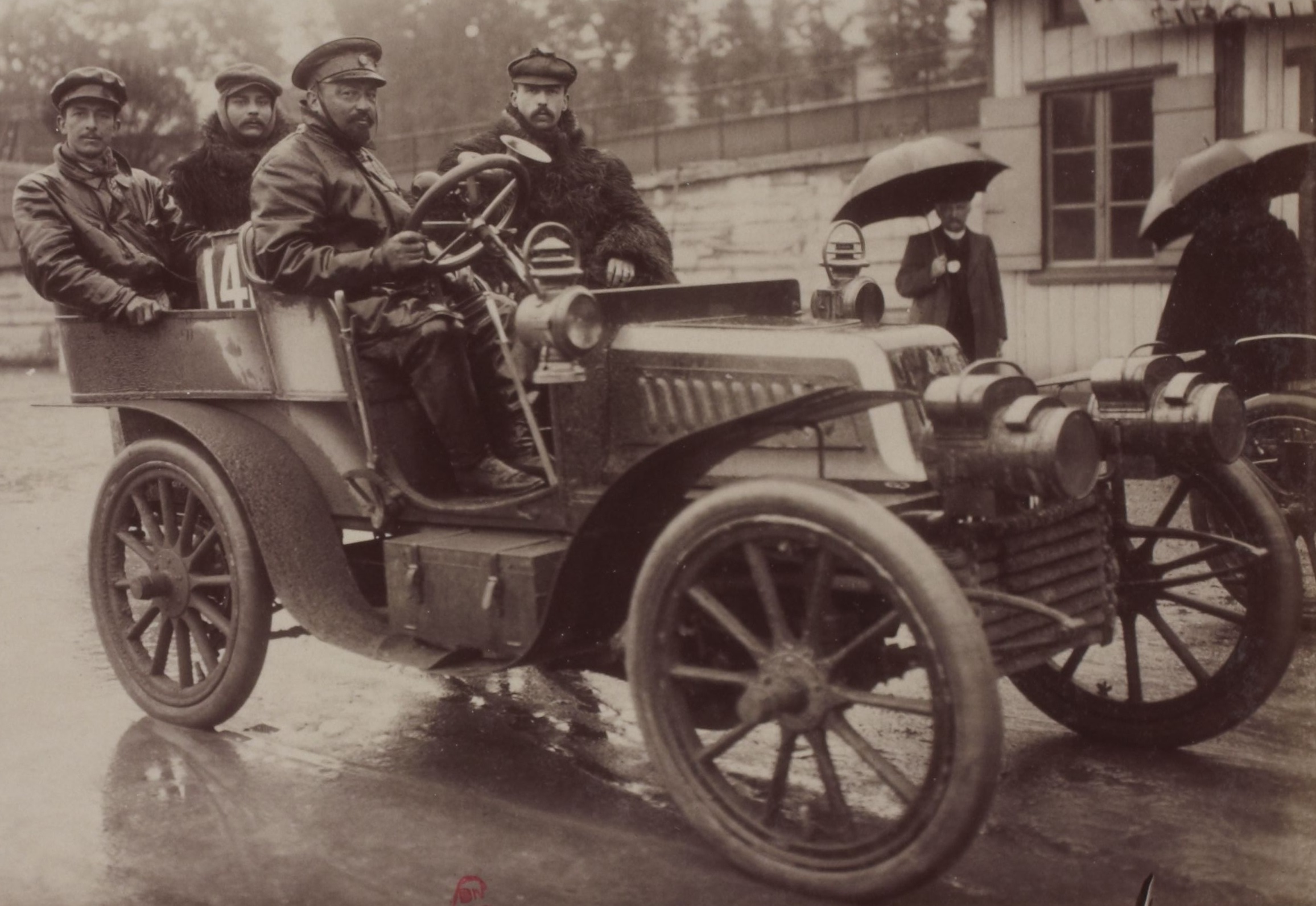
Eugène Brillié on the Circuit du Nord in 1902

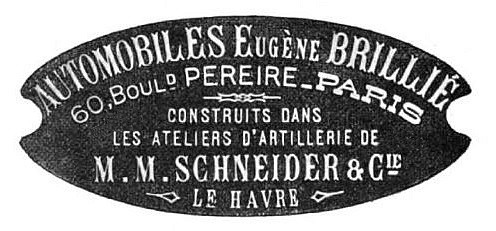
Brillié advertisement of 1907

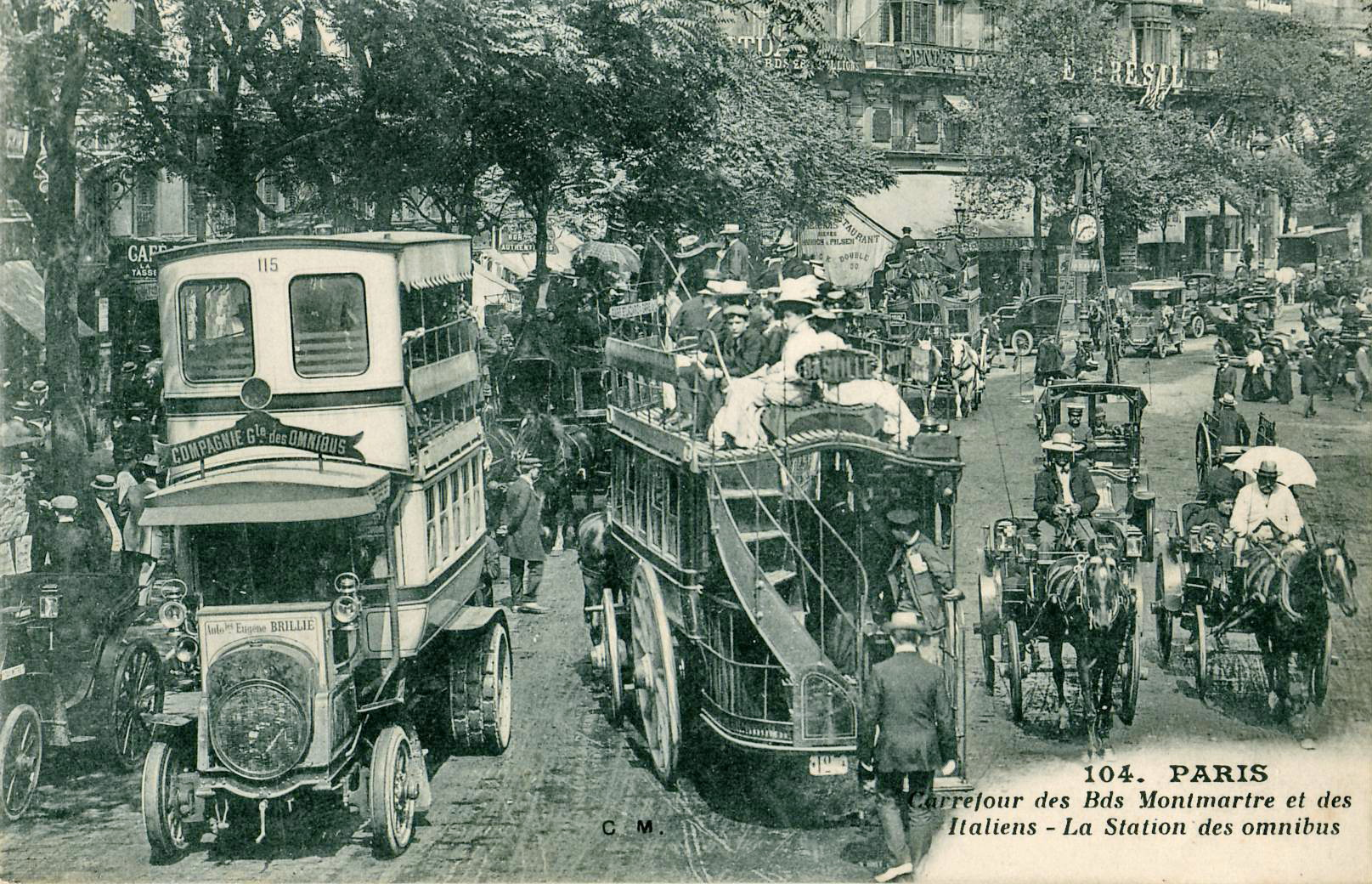
Schneider Brillié omnibus in Paris between 1907 and 1911

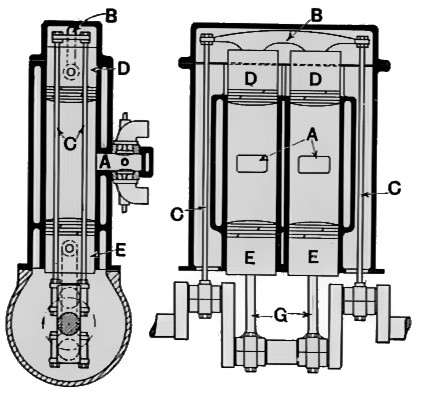
The opposed-piston engine used in Gobron-Brillié cars

Auguste Eugène Brillié (1863-1940) was a French engineer, who invented the first French battle tank, the Schneider CA1.

== Biography ==
=== Early years ===
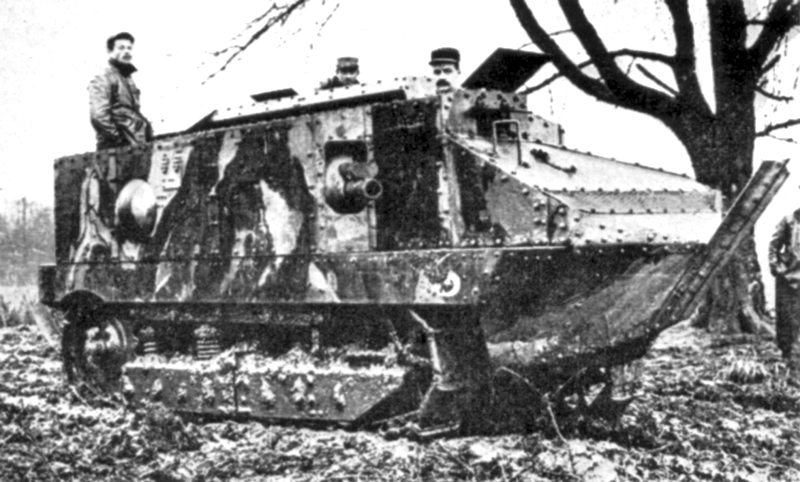
Schneider CA1 the tank designed by Brillié

Brillié was born on 8 May 1863 in the 19th arrondissement of Paris. After his studies at the École Centrale Paris, he began his career from 1887 to 1898 at the Compagnie des Chemins de fer de l'Ouest.

=== Cars ===
Gobron-Brillié

He joined with Gustave Gobron to create the Société des Moteurs Gobron-Brillié and to develop an opposed-piston engine he had invented. The Gobron-Brillié brand acquired a certain fame. It participated in the Paris–Madrid race of 1903, and set speed records, including that of being the first car to exceed 160 km/h (100 mph). In 1903 the UK agents for Gobron-Brillié were Botwood and Egerton. In 1905 the Gobron-Brillie British Motor Company was established.

Eugène Brillié

In 1903, Eugène Brillié ended his partnership with Gobron. He created the automobile company Eugène Brillié and had cars of his design built by the workshops of Schneider & Cie at Le Havre (former Forge Artillery Workshops and Chantiers de la Méditerranée, bought by Schneider in 1897). His brand was then offering passenger cars and utility cars. Schneider gradually took over the Brillié Company. While working for Schneider he designed the artillery tractor for the first motorized artillery system for Portugal. The design was based on one of his dump trucks.

Nagant-Gobron-Brillie

In Belgium, Leon and Maurice Nagant of Liège made some Gobron-Brillie products under licence.

=== Locomotive ===
Brillié designed an experimental Naphthalene locomotive, which was built by Schneider in 1913.

=== Tanks ===
During the First World War, a meeting between Colonel Estienne and Brillié led to the development of a tank project in December 1915. In early January 1916, Marshal Joffre authorized the continuation of the project and, on 31 January, asked for the purchase of 400 of what were then called "land battleships" armed with 75 mm guns. These were the first French tanks, the Schneider CA1.

=== Death ===
Brillié died on 28 May 1940 in Seignelay (Yonne).
