= Naphthalene locomotive =

Locomotive using naphthalene as fuel

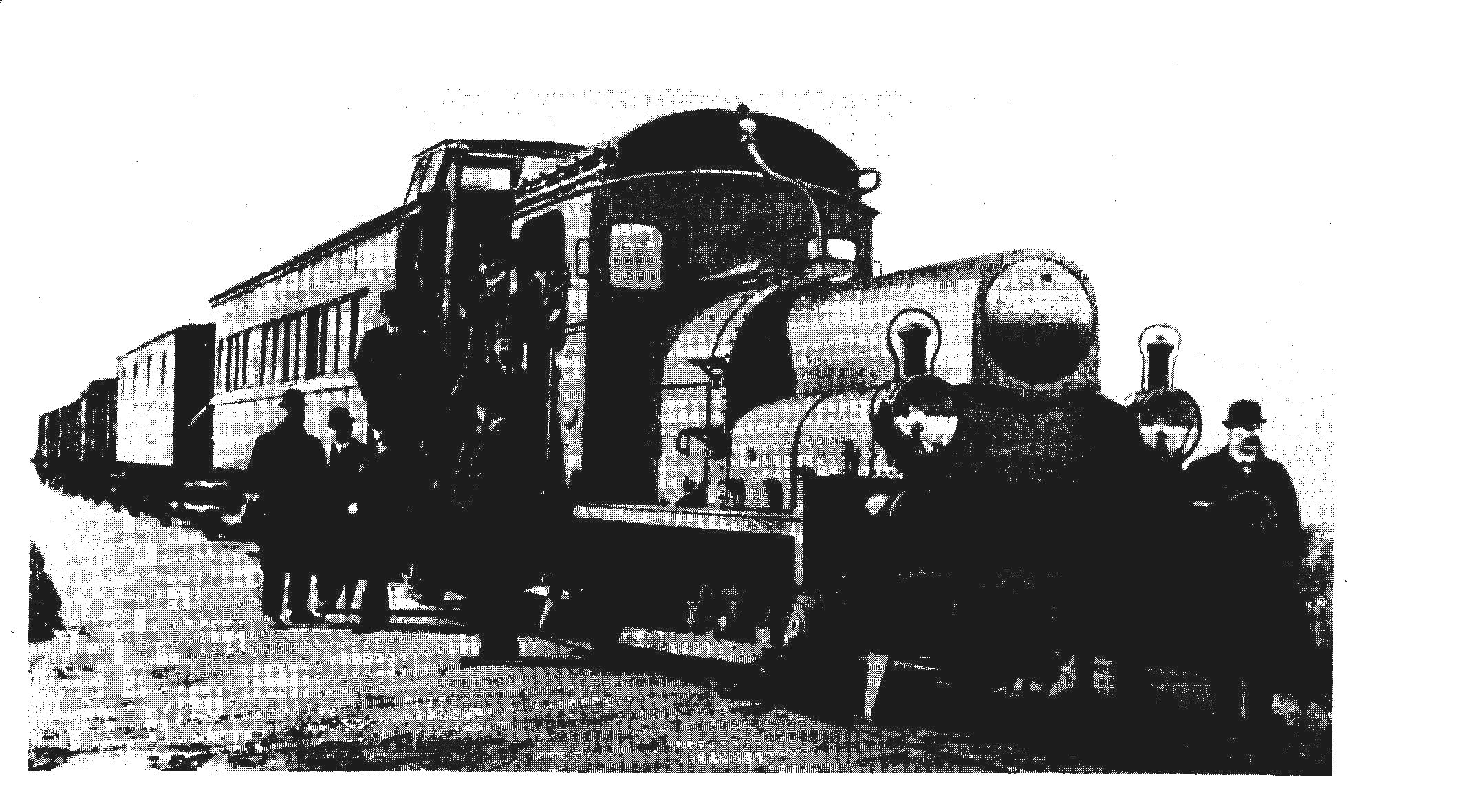
Naphthalene locomotive, 1913

A naphthalene locomotive was tested in France in 1913. It was built by Schneider-Creusot for use in their own plant.

== Overview ==
At the beginning of the twentieth century, steam locomotives continued to dominate the railways but alternatives were being considered. One of the problems to be solved was that of finding a cheap fuel. Liquid fuels, such as naphtha, petrol, benzole and alcohol had all been tried, but were expensive. Naphthalene seemed attractive because of its low cost, due to its origin from coal tar. An experiment was carried out by Schneider-Creusot. The Schneider establishment consisted of two distinct areas that were connected to each other by a rail link running through a tunnel. Steam traction was in use and the tunnel was filled with smoke from the locomotives. Following experiments carried out on a Renault car, it was decided to build a small naphthalene-powered locomotive.

== The project ==
The prototype was designed by the chief designer of Schneider, Eugène Brillié, in conjunction with the Society of French Civil Engineers. The locomotive was standard gauge with a cab and a bonnet containing the engine. There were two sets of buffers, at different heights, for coupling to normal railway wagons and to flat wagons for internal use within the plant. It was equipped with an automobile-derived internal combustion engine with four cylinders, a displacement of 12.3 L (750 in^{3}) and a maximum power of 50 kW (67 hp). The engine was designed by Brillié.

=== Fuel supply ===
Since naphthalene is solid at room temperature and pressure, the engine was started with petrol or benzene. The naphthalene tank was enclosed in a water jacket, which was heated to boiling point by engine exhaust. Once the naphthalene liquefied at 80 °C (176 °F), it could be used as a fuel. British patent 26541 awarded to Gaston Paul Jean Lion and Eugène Brillié in 1907, describes a fuel melting system but it differs from that described above. There was no water jacket and the solid fuel was heated directly by the exhaust gas. It would be difficult to regulate the temperature in such a system and this may be why the water jacket was introduced. The water jacket system was a Schneider patent, GB190821478.

=== Transmission ===
Transmission of power from the engine to the wheels was by a pneumatic transmission system called the "Hautier aerothermal transformer". It consisted of an air compressor, driven by the prime mover, which fed a compressed air motor which drove the wheels. Hautier is not identified but he may have been Camille Jean Hautier who held several patents for compressed air transmission systems, e.g. GB190928918 and GB191308846. The general construction of the machine was similar to that of other locomotives of its time. From the little information available, it seems that it was only equipped with a handbrake.

== Operation ==
The locomotive began its service in 1913 within the Schneider plant. The company's management then asked the Chemins de fer de l'État to test it with their dynamometer car. The trials took place in April 1913 on a two-kilometre link between the Harfleur workshops and the Le Hoc range. The locomotive hauled a load of up to 160 t (157.5 long tons; 176.4 short tons) with a tractive effort of 7.9 kN (1,800 lbf). In regular use within the Schneider plant, the locomotive met expectations for traction but its maintenance proved to be very difficult. A similar, but narrow-gauge, locomotive of 150 kW (200 hp) was built for a railway company in southern Algeria but it appears to have been scrapped after only a few years.

== Other countries ==
=== United Kingdom ===
There was also interest in the use of naphthalene as a motor fuel in the United Kingdom. In 1917, the Commercial Motor reported on experiments conducted by J.H. Willis and G.G. Wilson, of Birmingham Corporation Gas Works, using naphthalene fuel in a 10 hp (7.5 kW) motor boat engine. The tests were hailed as a success but nothing further seems to have been done.

=== Mexico ===
The idea seems to re-surface periodically. A 1997 patent of Luis Cisneros Zazueta claims: "The invention can be used for all type of four-cycle gasoline engines operating under the Jammes Otto thermodynamic cycle, which comprise a carburetor or a fuel injection system, the number of cylinders being unimportant. Naphthalene low cost and efficiency make the use of this device inexpensive".
