= Renfe Class 340 =

Class of Spanish diesel-hydraulic locomotive

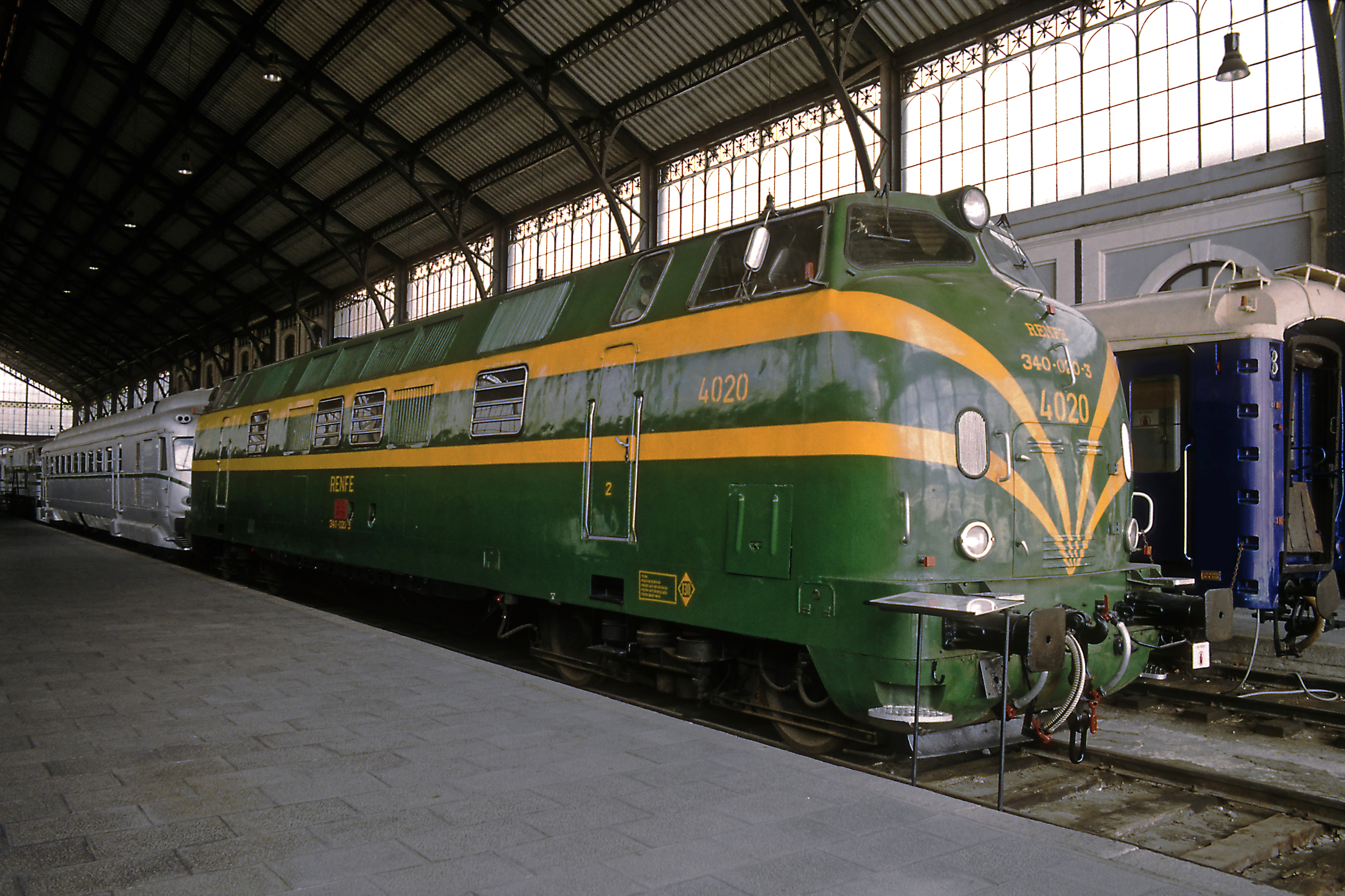
- Renfe 340 020 (previously 4020) in the National Railway Museum in Madrid
Type and origin
- Power type: Diesel-hydraulic
- Builder: Krauss-Maffei 4000 to 4010; 4011 onwards: Babcock & Wilcox
- Build date: 1966
- Total produced: 32
Specifications
- Configuration
  - UIC: B'B'
- Gauge: 1,668 mm (5 ft 5 21/32 in)
- Length: 19.75 m (64 ft 9.6 in) (20.35 m or 66 ft 9.2 in over buffers)
- Width: 3.08 m (10 ft 1.26 in)
- Height: 4.26 m (13 ft 11.72 in)
- Loco weight: 88 t (87 long tons; 97 short tons)
- Fuel capacity: 5,000 L (1,100 imp gal; 1,300 US gal)
- Prime mover: 2 Maybach diesel model MD 870
- Cylinders: V16
- Transmission: Hydraulic Maybach Mekydro K 184 BT
Performance figures
- Maximum speed: 130 km/h
- Power output: 2 x 2,000 hp (1,500 kW)
Career
- Operators: Renfe
- Locale: Spain
- Last run: 1987

The Class 340 of Renfe (4000 under the previous numbering scheme) were a class of 4-axle diesel-hydraulic locomotives built by Krauss-Maffei (and Babcock & Wilcox) for the Spanish Railways. The design is similar in outward appearance and technology to the DB Class V 200. 32 units were built.

== Background and History ==
The locomotives had a total power of 4,000 hp (3,000 kW) from 2 motors (each a 16-cylinder Maybach/Mercedes-Benz MD870) diesel engine. Hydraulic transmissions used were two Mekydro K184.

The contract consisted of a series of 32 units which were shipped between 1966 and 1969, ten manufactured in Germany by Krauss-Maffei and the remaining twenty-two manufactured Spain by Babcock & Wilcox. The locomotives were similar to the V 200.1 Series of the Deutsche Bundesbahn, but with more power, more weight and slightly longer.

The units were conceived as locomotives for passenger services, with a maximum speed of 130 km/h (81 mph), but then were also used for freight trains which together with inadequate maintenance led to many failures in this series.

None are currently in service and 30 of the 32 units have been scrapped, the 4020 (Renfe 340 020) is in the Museo del Ferrocarril de Madrid and the 4026 (Renfe 340 026) is in the process of being restored by the AZAFT (Asociación Zaragozana de Amigos del Ferrocarril y Tranvías).
