= Renfe Class 353 =

Class of Spanish diesel-hydraulic locomotive

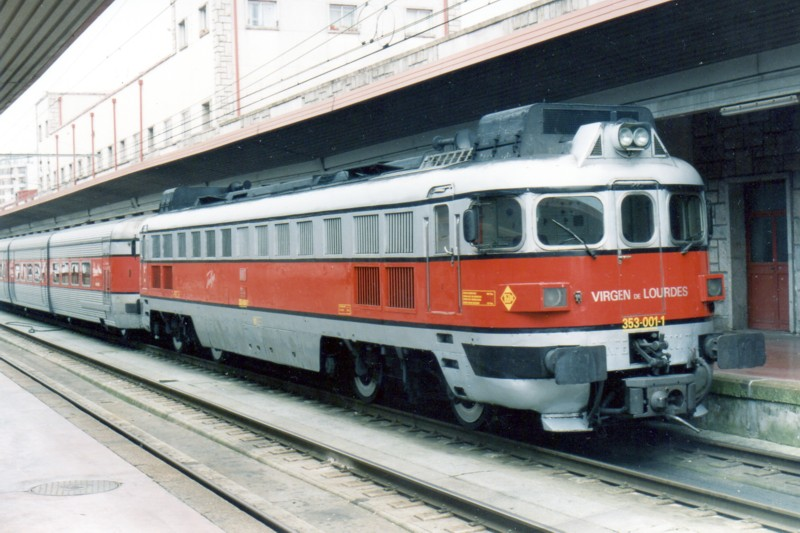
- Renfe 353 001 at Irun (Guipúzcoa)
Type and origin
- Power type: Diesel-hydraulic
- Build date: 1968-1969
- Total produced: 5
Specifications
- Configuration
  - UIC: B'B'
- Gauge: 1,668 mm (5 ft 5 21/32 in)/1,435 mm (4 ft 8 1/2 in)
- Wheel diameter: 1,150 mm (45.28 in)
- Length: 19 m (62 ft 4.0 in)
- Width: 3.04 m (9 ft 11.69 in)
- Height: 3.45 m (11 ft 3.83 in)
- Loco weight: 88 t (87 long tons; 97 short tons)
- Fuel capacity: 4,000 L (880 imp gal; 1,100 US gal)
- Power supply: 2 auxiliary motors for electrical supply @ 175 kW (235 hp) each
- Prime mover: 2 Maybach MD 655 Z
- Engine type: Four-stroke(?) diesel
- Cylinders: V12
- Transmission: Hydraulic: Maybach Mekydro K184 U
- MU working: Yes
- Safety systems: ASFA
Performance figures
- Maximum speed: 180 km/h (110 mph)
- Power output: 3,000 hp (2,200 kW)
Career
- Operators: Renfe
- Locale: Spain
- Delivered: 1968/1969

The Renfe Class 353, formerly known as the T-3000 are a class of diesel-hydraulic locomotives built by Krauss-Maffei for express trains in Spain.

== Background and design ==
The class could be described as the bigger and better version of the Renfe Class 352, being similar in design, and from the same builder, but with more power and also two cabins to simplify operation.

They were delivered between 1968 and 1969, built to a similar two-engined hydraulic transmission design as the Class 352 but with Maybach 12-cylinder engine developing more power, 1,500 hp (1,100 kW) (at 1600 rpm) each, giving a tractive effort of 268 kN (60,000 lb_{f}). Built with two interior walkways via the cabins, the locomotives were a little heavier than their predecessors at 88 t (87 long tons; 97 short tons).

The locomotives were fitted with coupling screws and Scharfenberg couplers. Auxiliary generators provide electrical power for the coaches.

Two sets of standard gauge bogies were also supplied, for cross border work (bogie exchange).

The locomotives were painted in red-silver.

== Operations ==
A total of five diesel were acquired to pull the Talgo III coaches at a record speed of over 220 km/h (140 mph). Their commission was related to the inauguration of the Talgo III RD (dual gauge) coached train from Madrid to Paris via Burgos, Vitoria, Hendaya and Bordeaux.

The trains also worked other international trains such as Barcelona to Geneva via Narbonne, Montpellier and Culoz, and the Paris to Barcelona; taking charge of the train after it passed the change of gauge to broad Iberian gauge at the stations of Irún and Portbou.

In May 1972, one of them reached a speed of 222 km/h (138 mph) between Guadalajara and Azuqueca de Henares. Between Alcázar de San Juan and Rio Záncara, on 4 May 1978, 353-001 reached 230 kilometres per hour (140 mph), for some time the class held the world speed record for diesel traction.

The mass electrifications in the eighties reduced the radius of action of both the Class 352 and Class 353, operating primarily in the axes Badajoz / Lisbon, Granada / Almería, Murcia / Cartagena and direct corridor from Madrid to Burgos.

The standard gauge bogies found a use unexpected at the time of the locomotives inception – in 1991 was used to tow a Talgo Pendular train on the high speed Madrid to Seville AVE line.

The class was retired on 25 September 2003. The 353-005-2 is preserved in working condition at the museum of Vilanova.

== Fleet details ==
Original number	UIC number	Name	Manufacturer	manufacturers number	Introduction	Withdrawal	Kilometres travelled
3001 T	353-001-1	"Virgen de Lourdes"	Krauss-Maffei	19449	1968	9 March 2003	5913610
3002 T	353-002-9	"Virgen de Fatima"	Krauss-Maffei	19450	1968	5 August 2001	5765725
3003 T	353-003-7	"Virgen del Yugo"	Krauss-Maffei	19451	1968	25 September 1990	4385799
3004 T	353-004-5	"Virgen de la Paloma"	Krauss-Maffei	19452	1969	9 February 1983	2894871
3005 T	353-005-2	"Virgen de la Bien Aparecida"	Krauss-Maffei	19453	1969	25 September 2003	6041510

== See also ==
- Renfe Class 352, Renfe Class 354 - Predecessor and successor classes, built to a very similar design by Krauss-Maffei.
