= Renfe Class 269 =

Spanish electric locomotive class

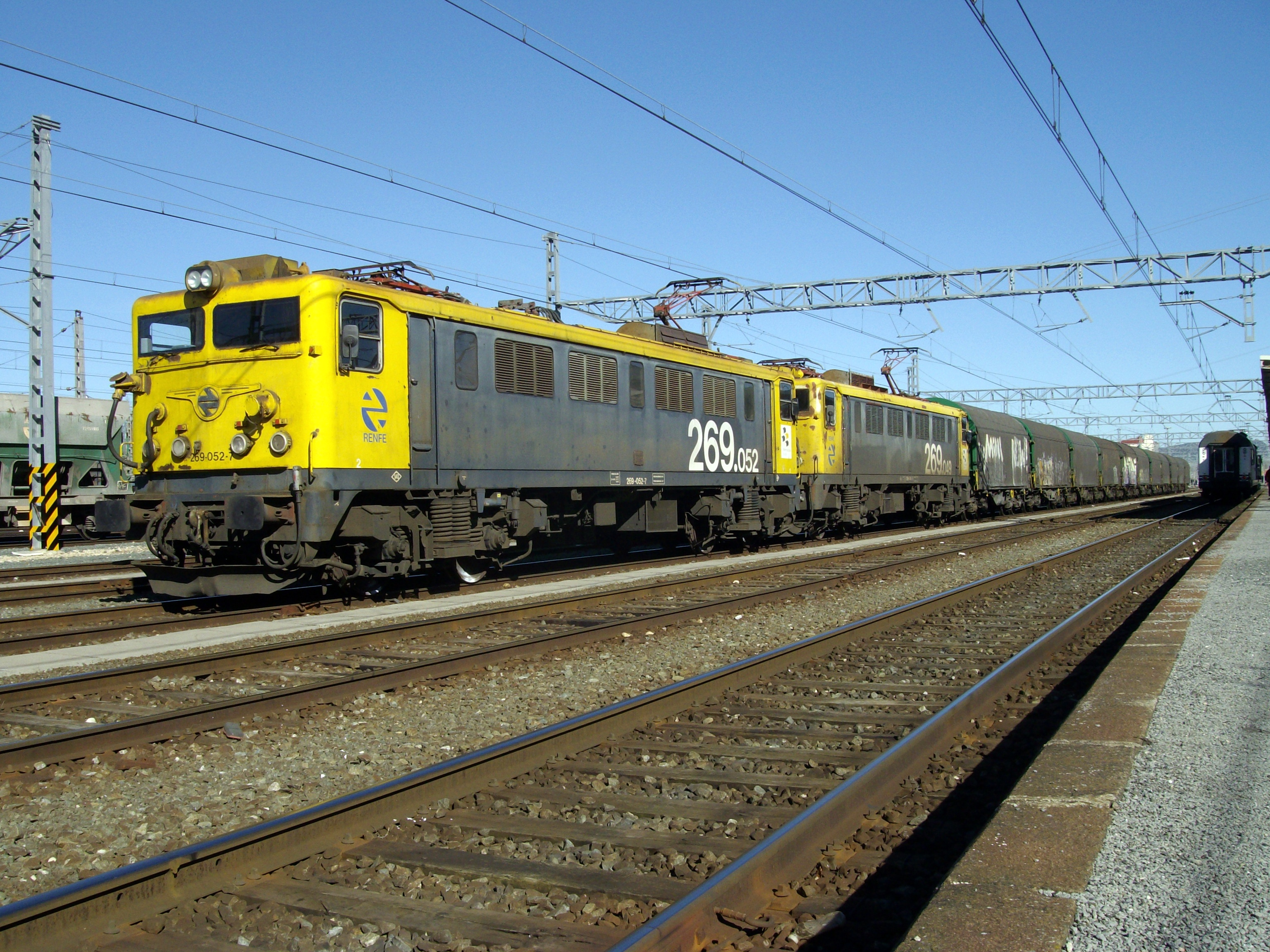
- Two Class 269s hauling a freight train in February 2009
Type and origin
- Power type: Electric
- Builder: CAF, Macosa, Mitsubishi Heavy Industries; Electrical equipment: Mitsubishi Electric, Cenemesa, Westinghouse, General Electric
- Build date: 1973–1985
- Total produced: 265
Specifications
- Configuration
  - AAR: B-B
- Gauge: 1,668 mm (5 ft 5 21/32 in)
- Wheel diameter: 1,250 mm (4 ft 1 in)
- Length: 17,270 mm (56 ft 8 in)
- Width: 3,126 mm (10 ft 3.1 in)
- Height: 3,680 mm (12 ft 1 in)
- Loco weight: 88 t
- Electric system/s: 3000 V DC overhead catenary
- Current pickup: Pantograph
- Loco brake: Rheostatic
Performance figures
- Maximum speed: between 80 km/h (50 mph) and 200 km/h (125 mph) (depending on series and gear)
- Power output: 4,185 hp (3,121 kW)
Career
- Operators: Renfe; Empresa de los Ferrocarriles del Estado
- Disposition: Spain, Chile

The Renfe Class 269 is a class of electric locomotives operated by Renfe in Spain. They were built by CAF and Macosa under license from Mitsubishi.

After the turn of the millennium RENFE began to sell some, three even went to Chile. A large number was withdrawn around 2015 after they had been replaced by more modern and more powerful locomotives with three-phase traction motors, most notably the series 252 and 253.

== Variants ==
Multiple variants of the Class 269 exist:

- 269.0: 80/140 km/h freight variant
- 269.2: 100/160 km/h variant for intermodal and passenger trains
- 269.5: 90/160 km/h variant for intermodal and freight trains
- 269.7: 120 km/h (75 mph) variant for intermodal trains
- 269.9: 140 km/h (85 mph) variant used for overnight services
- Four rebuilt locomotives with streamlined cabs for 200 km/h (125 mph) operation
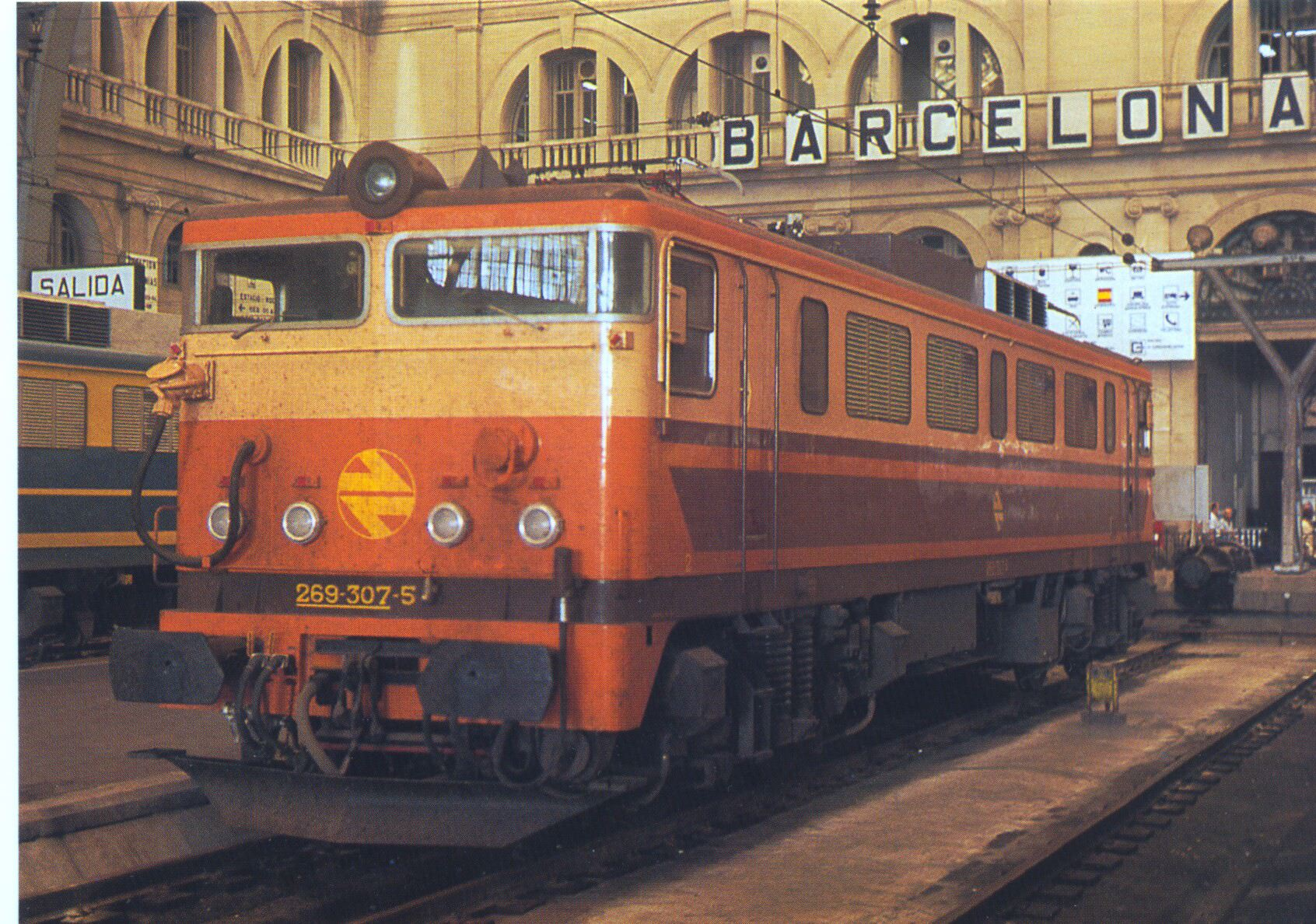
269-307 in Estrella-livery in June 2005

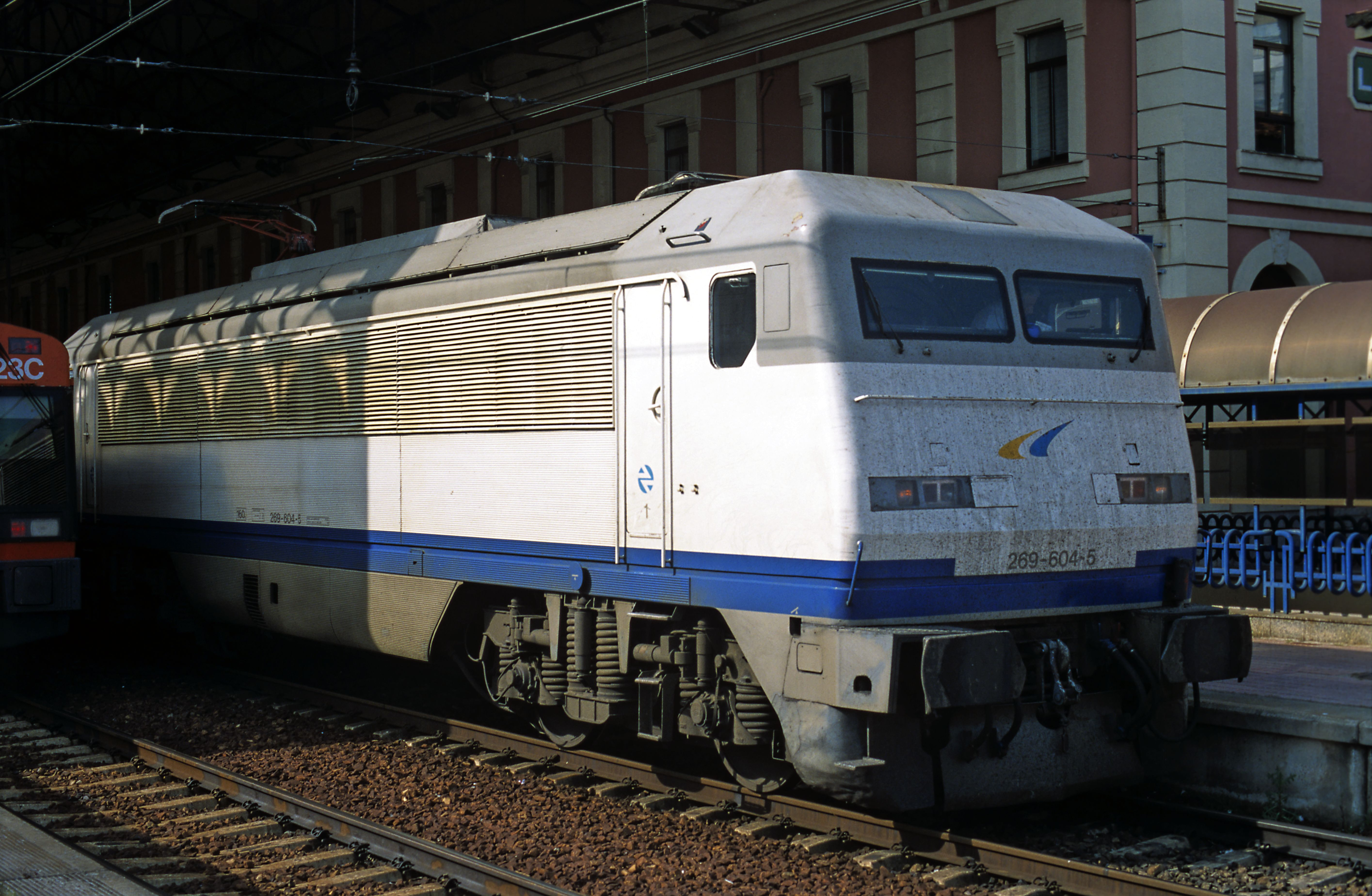
Streamlined 269 with a Talgo train in June 2004

== Technical specifications ==
The locomotives are equipped with monomotor bogies, which have two gears. They use rheostatic braking.

== History ==
The locomotives were introduced in 1973. A total of 265 locomotives have been built.

Four Class 269 locomotives were sold to Empresa de los Ferrocarriles del Estado (EFE), the Chilean national rail operator, in 2003. Further withdrawn Class 269 locomotives went on sale in 2010.
