= Hohenzollern Locomotive Works =

German manufacturer (1872–1929)

- Company type: Limited company (Aktiengesellschaft)
- Industry: Mechanical engineering and plant manufacturing
- Founded: 8 June 1872
- Defunct: November 1929
- Headquarters: Düsseldorf-Grafenberg

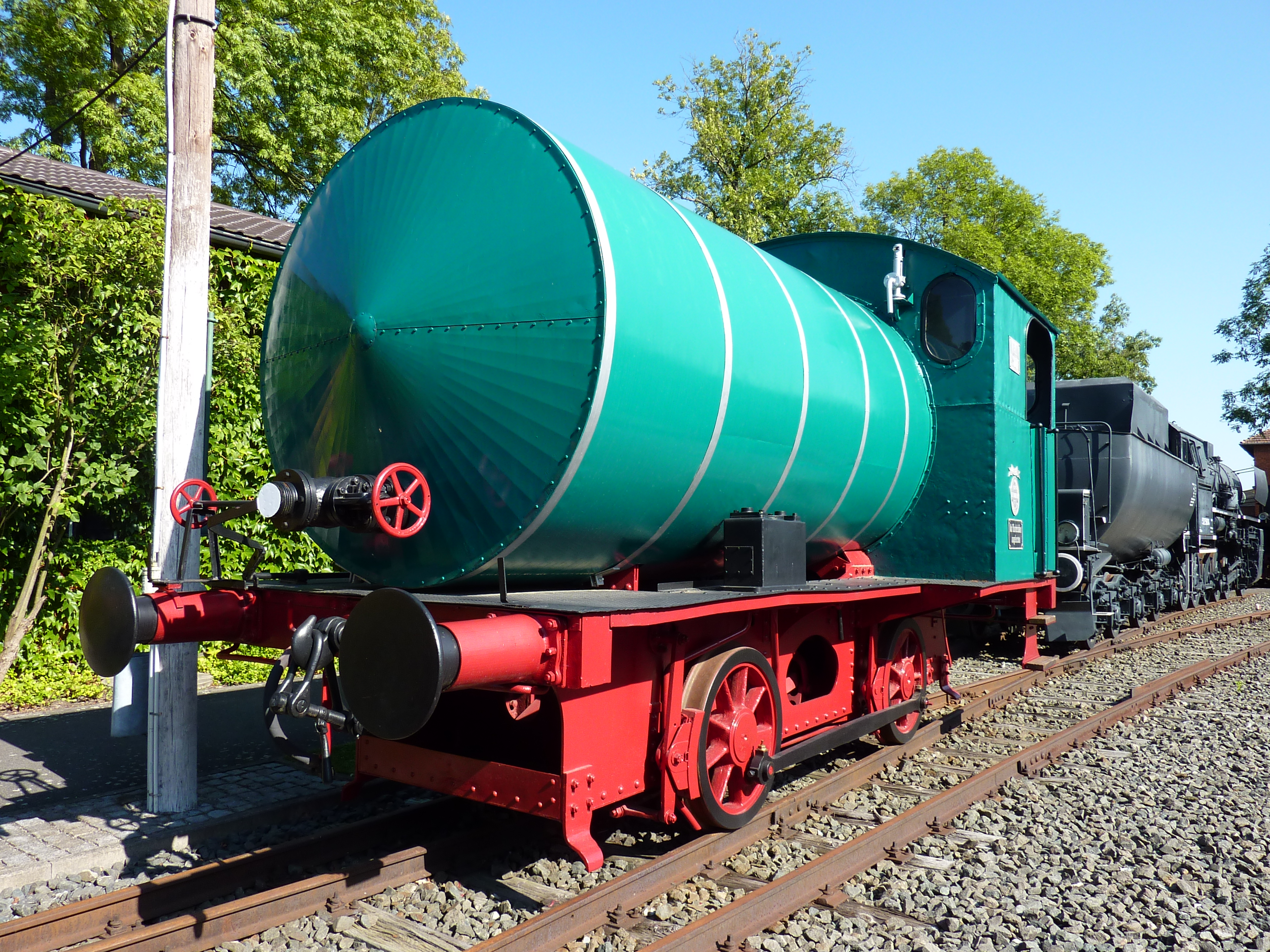
No. 2542

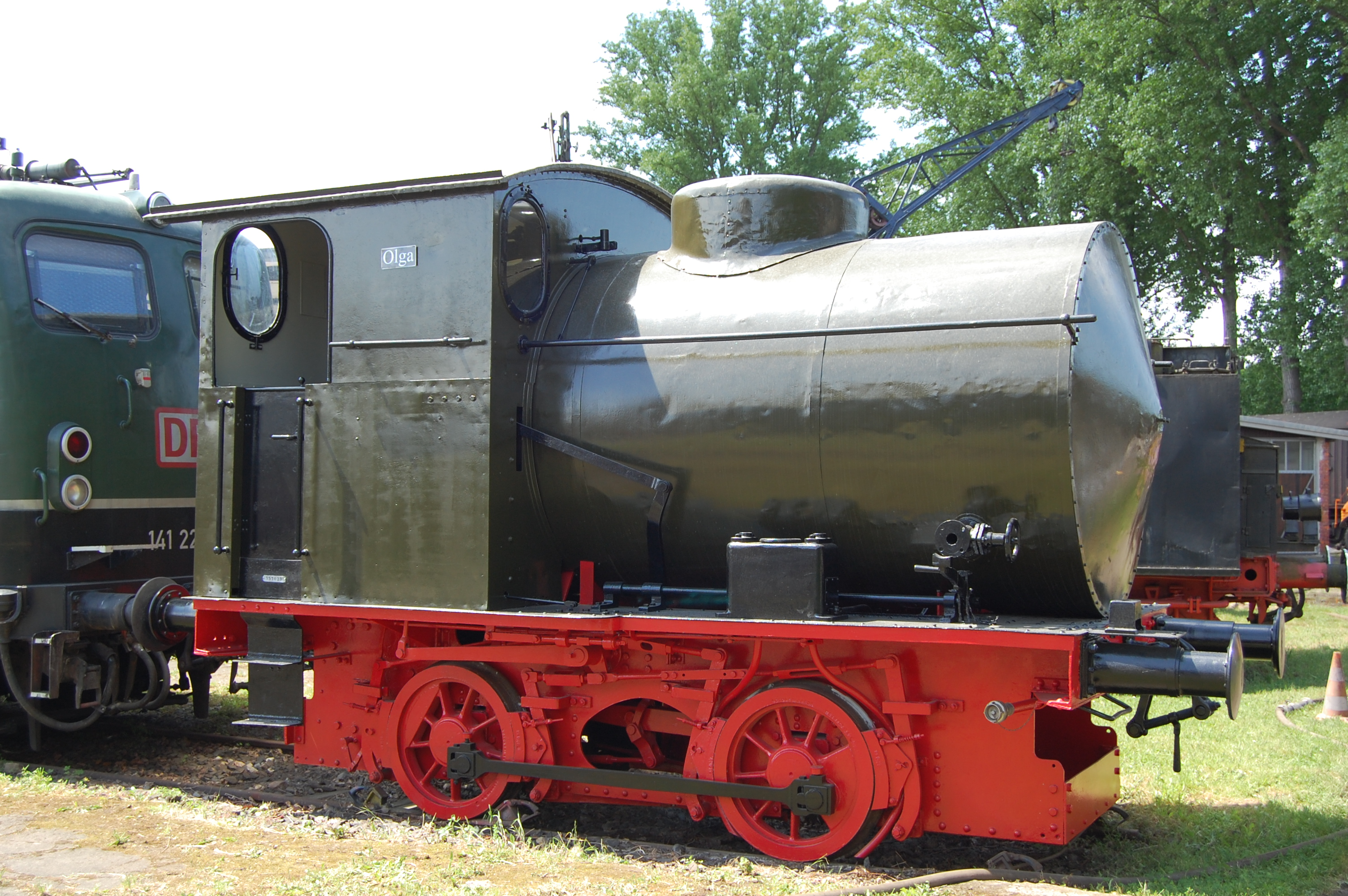
Fireless locomotive built by Hohenzollern in 1911

The Hohenzollern Locomotive Works (Aktiengesellschaft für Lokomotivbau Hohenzollern) was a German locomotive-building company which operated from 1872 to 1929. The Hohenzollern works was a manufacturer of standard gauge engines and about 400 fireless locomotives as well as diesel locomotives of various rail gauges.

The company was founded on 8 June 1872 in Grafenberg near Düsseldorf. The firm produced around 4,600 locomotives. After the increasingly critical situation in the German locomotive building industry around 1929 the works was closed in November 1929. The Hohenzollern AG had hoped in vain for follow-on orders for the DRG Class 80 from the Deutsche Reichsbahn-Gesellschaft (DRG).

Locomotive number 80 030 in the Bochum-Dahlhausen Railway Museum was one of the last built by the Lokomotivbau Hohenzollern and is preserved today in photograph-grey livery. The last locomotives left the factory in September 1929; it was immediately torn down.

== Fireless steam locomotives ==
Hohenzollern built a large number of fireless locomotives, including some articulated fireless locomotives with a cab at each end. Hohenzollern's fireless locomotives were unusual in having inside cylinders. The German term for fireless steam locomotive is Dampfspeicherlokomotive, meaning steam storage locomotive.

Each locomotive had two 2-axle bogies. On no. 1685 only one axle was powered, but on the others, two axles were powered. For an explanation of wheel arrangements see: AAR wheel arrangement. Nos. 1685 and 2107 (both designed for use in mines) had air-cooled condensers to condense the exhaust steam.

Works no.	Date built	Gauge	Wheel arrgt	Name	Condenser
1685	1904	840 mm (2 ft 9 1/16 in)	1A-2	BERGMANN	Yes
2107	1907	840 mm (2 ft 9 1/16 in)	B-2	GNOM	Yes
2483	1909	780 mm (2 ft 6 23/32 in)	B-2	–	No

== Diesel locomotives ==
Hohenzollern supplied a 1,200 horsepower (890 kW) diesel-mechanical locomotive to the Russian State Railways in the 1920s. This had a constant-mesh gearbox with an individual electromagnetic clutch to engage each gear.

Around the same time, Russian State Railways also took delivery of a 1,200 horsepower (890 kW) diesel-electric locomotive, class E el-2, designed in Russia by Professor Lomonosov. Work on this locomotive was started by Hohenzollern, but for political reasons, it was later transferred to Maschinenfabrik Esslingen.

== See also ==
- South African Class 16DA 4-6-2
- VMH 1-4

== Sources ==
- The Locomotive Engineers' Pocket Book 1934, (UK), publisher unknown, page 286
- The Industrial Railway Record, published by the Industrial Railway Society, ISSN 0537-5347, no. 166 (2001), page 10 and no. 170 (2002), pp 216–218
