= Kīlauea Sugar Plantation Railway =

Railway network in Kilauea, Kauaʻi, Hawaii

Kīlauea Sugar Plantation
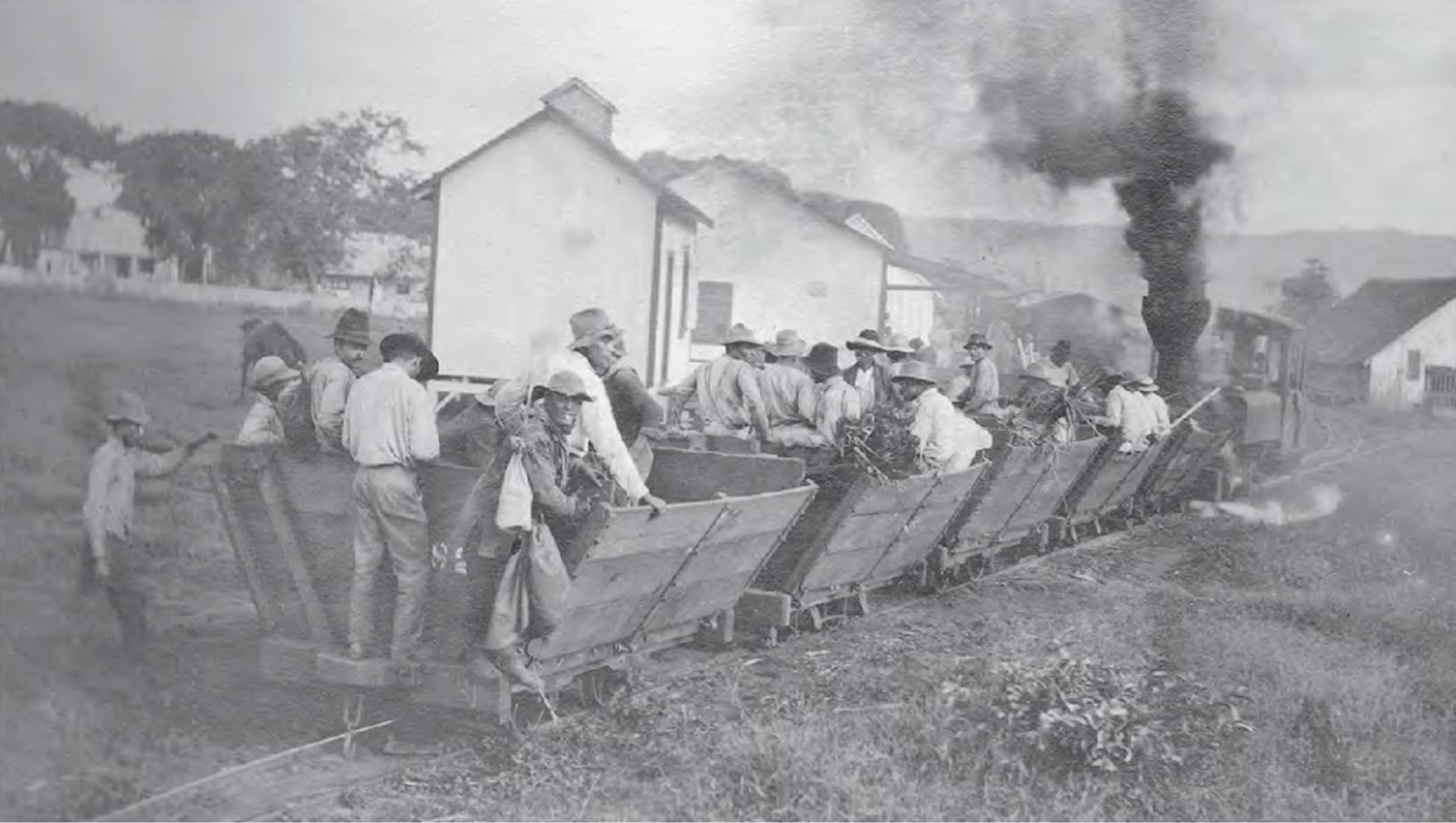
- Laborer's train

Technical
- Line length: 17 1/2 miles (28 km)
- Track gauge: 2 ft (610 mm)

The Kīlauea Sugar Plantation Railway or Kīlauea Track Line was, from 1881–1944, a 12 1/2 miles (20 km) long narrow gauge railway network with a gauge of 2 ft (610 mm) for transporting sugarcane and sugar at the Kilauea Sugar Plantation in Kilauea on Kauaʻi of Hawaii.

== History ==
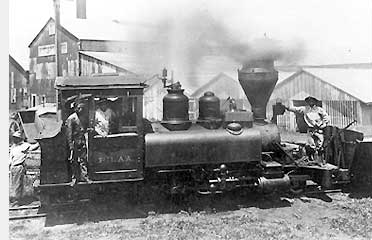
Locomotive 'Pilaa' on the mill yard of Kīlauea Sugar Co. in 1895 (probably Dale W. Anderson Collection)

The Kīlauea Sugar Plantation imported in 1881 a steam locomotive and the material needed for constructing the track. John Fowler & Co., based in Leeds, England, delivered a complete package of 4,248 railway sleepers, rails, bends and switches, hardware and other products, as well as several tons of coal, in addition to the Fowler narrow gauge steam locomotive with works No 4085. It arrived in Honolulu on 27 August 1881 aboard The City of Glasgow from Glasgow, Scotland, and was subsequently shipped from there to Kauai.

On 24 September 1881, the track construction work began when Princess Lydia Pākī, later Queen Lili'uokalani hit the first spike in one of the railway sleepers. C.V. Houseman managed the track laying work. At the end of November 1881, a 3 miles (5 km) route had already been laid and put into operation.

In 1882, the plantation acquired by the Hohenzollern Locomotive Works another locomotive, which was built in Düsseldorf with the factory number 284 and Kilauea was called. The plant also acquired in 1894 and 1902 the locomotives Pilaa and Kahili from the Baldwin Locomotive Works in Pennsylvania. The network consisted in 1910 of 12 1/2 miles (20 km) permanent track and 5 miles (8 km) portable track, 200 sugarcane transport cars, six sugar transport cars and four locomotives. The locomotives could each haul up to ten cars loaded with sugar cane.

== Route ==
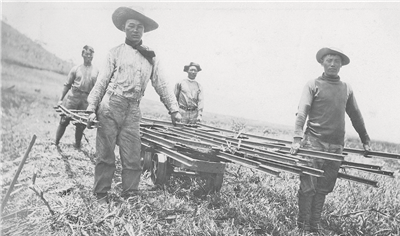
Portable track

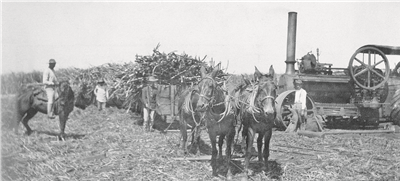
Horse-drawn cars in the fields

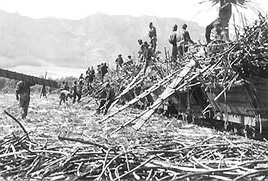
Sugarcane loading

The track was the first laid on the territory of Hawaii. The 3 miles (5 km) long mainline began at the northern end of Aalona Street in Kilauea and led southwards over Kolo Road onto Pukalani Square. It crossed the Kuhio Highway and headed then southwards along Kuawa Road, crossed Waiuli Dam and crossed the Puukumu Stream for a total of 3 miles (5 km).

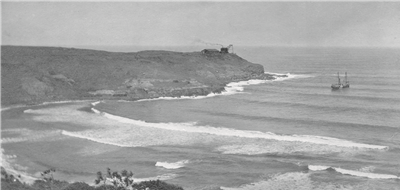
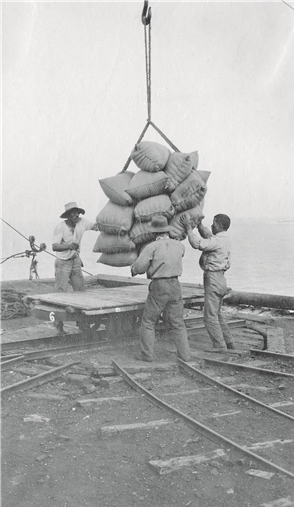
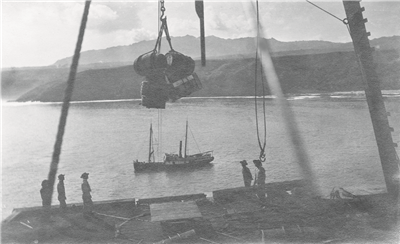
Shipping of the refined sugar at Kahili Landing near Mo’ko’lea Point

The second, also 3 miles (5 km) long line led from the sugar mill to Kahili Landing, where the packaged, ground sugar was loaded onto the steamers anchored at Mo'ko'lea Point using a wire rope winch. It started halfway on Kilauea Road, then northwards and eastwards to Makanaano Square and ended at Kahili Landing above Mo'ko'lea Point. There the ships anchored to be loaded with 125 pounds (57 kg) sugar bags each. The operations at Kahili Landing and on the railway line leading there were abandoned in 1928, whereupon the sugar was transported from the sugar mill to Ahukini Landing for shipment.

A third line started at the Lili'uokalni Street crossed the Kilauea River on a wooden trestle bridge and ended in the ahupua'a of Lepeuli. Remnants of the former Kilauea Sugar Plantation railway and the Ko'olau ditch can be seen in Lepeuli.

The sugar cane transport was carried out with five steam locomotives. Each of the locomotives could haul up to ten cars loaded with sugar cane. The railway operation was ramped-down in late 1939, because truck transport proved to be more advantageous. By the spring of 1942, road transport had replaced railway locomotives and trucks were used to transport sugar cane to the Kilauea mill.

== Sugar mill ==
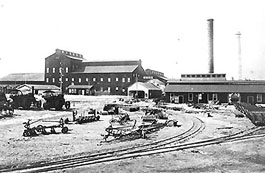
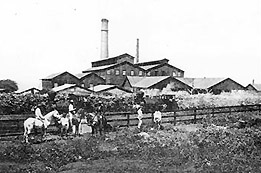
Railway operation at the sugar mill

The company was founded in 1880 in Hawaii under the name Kilauea Sugar Company Limited. It was called Kilauea Sugar Plantation Company after it had been bought in April 1899 by a Californian company. The company's headquarters were in San Francisco, California, with a local office in Kilauea. The company's commercial agency in Honolulu, CA Brewer and Company Ltd, became the major share holder of the company in 1955, which was subsequently renamed Kilauea Sugar Company Limited again. Eventually, the sugar company extended over more than 10,000 acres in 8 ahupua’as. Approximately, 4,500 acres were used as sugar cane fields and approximately 2,000 acres as ranch land. The operation was closed-down on 31 December 1971.

== Environmental pollution ==
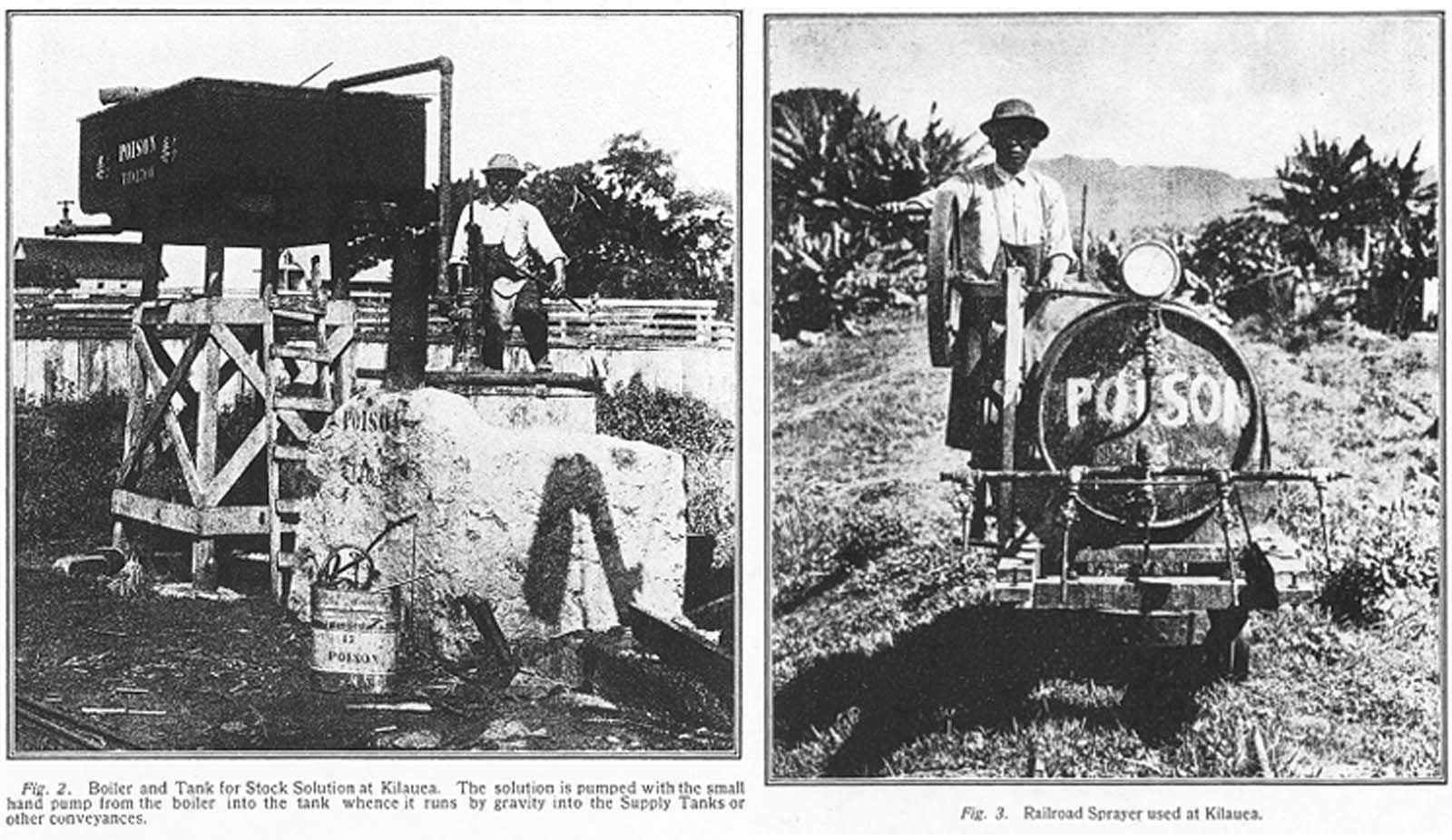
Plantation worker standing amidst containers marked “poison”, 1914

The photographs of a herbicide poison train taken in 1914 alarmed the Health Department’s Hazard Evaluation and Emergency Response Office to investigate and mitigate the environmental pollution caused by the sugar cane industry. Subsequently an extensive cleanup program was conducted in 2012, including in the removal of 814 tons of contaminated soil in the area.

== Wai Koa Loop Trail ==
The Wai Koa Loop Trail (22.210146°N 159.416059°W) is an easy hike of up to 8 km (5 mi) to the foundations of the bridge piers of the former railway. In the bicycle rental, gift shop & café of the Kauai Mini Golf & Botanical Gardens are Trail Waver forms available that must be signed before the walk, as the trail leads through private property through a mahogany plantation and several smaller family businesses.

== Literature ==
- Carol Maclennan: Kilauea Sugar Plantation in 1912: A Snapshot. The Hawaiian Journal of History, vol. 41 (2007). (47.6 MB)
- Kaua’i Historical Society: Finding Aid to the Kilauea Sugar Plantation Company Records, Kilauea, Kaua’i, Hawai’i. Records, 1877-(1932-1950s)-1971.

== See also ==
- Kauai Railway
- Kauai Plantation Railway
