= 25 kV AC railway electrification =

Standard current and voltage settings for most high-speed rail

Railway electrification systems used in Europe: Non-electrified 750 V DC 1.5 kV DC 3 kV DC 15 kV AC 25 kV AC High-speed lines in France, Spain, Italy, the Netherlands, Belgium and the United Kingdom operate under 25 kV, as do high power lines in the former Soviet Union.

Railway electrification systems using alternating current (AC) at 25 kilovolts (kV) are used worldwide, especially for high-speed rail. It is usually supplied at the standard utility frequency (typically 50 or 60 Hz), which simplifies traction substations.

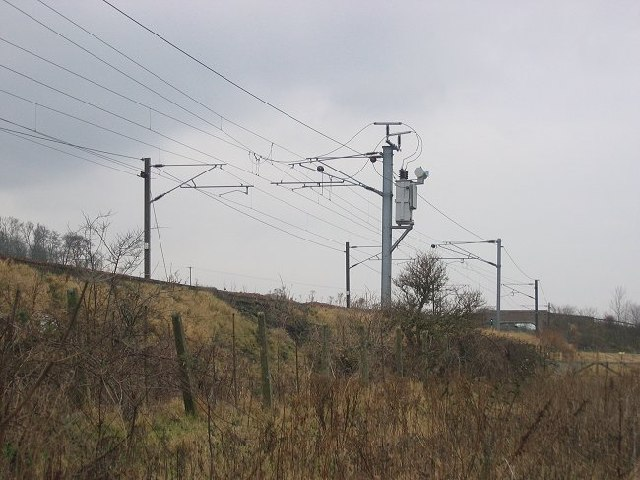
The East Coast Main Line in the United Kingdom is electrified using 25 kV 50 Hz overhead lines.

This electrification is ideal for railways that cover long distances or carry heavy traffic. After some experimentation before World War II in Hungary and in the Black Forest in Germany, it came into widespread use in the 1950s.

One of the reasons it was not introduced earlier was the lack of suitable small and lightweight control and rectification equipment before the development of solid-state rectifiers and related technology. Another reason was the increased clearance required under bridges and in tunnels to prevent arcing. Where existing loading gauges were more generous, this was less of an issue.

Railways using older, lower-capacity direct-current systems have introduced or are introducing 25 kV AC instead of 3 kV or 1.5 kV DC for their new high-speed lines.

== History ==
Many trial sites were developed at the beginning of the 20th century but developing a main frequency electrification was not easy. One of those trials, the Seebach-Wettingen railway electrification trial, not successful at 50 Hz for problems at the motors and interferences with the near telegraph lines, was the beginning of the standardization of the low frequency railway electrification.

The first successful operational and regular use of a utility frequency system dates back to 1931, tests having run since 1922. It was developed by Kálmán Kandó in Hungary, who used 16 kV AC at 50 Hz, asynchronous traction, and an adjustable number of (motor) poles. The first electrified line for testing was Budapest–Dunakeszi–Alag. The first fully electrified line was Budapest–Győr–Hegyeshalom (part of the Budapest–Vienna line). Although Kandó's solution showed a way for the future, railway operators outside of Hungary showed a lack of interest in the design.

The first railway to use this system was completed in 1936 by the Deutsche Reichsbahn who electrified part of the Höllentalbahn between Freiburg and Neustadt installing a 20 kV 50 Hz AC system. This part of Germany was in the French zone of occupation after 1945. As a result of examining the German system in 1951 the SNCF electrified the line between Aix-les-Bains and La Roche-sur-Foron in southern France, initially at the same 20 kV but converted to 25 kV in 1953. The 25 kV system was then adopted as standard in France, but since substantial amounts of mileage south of Paris had already been electrified at 1.5 kV DC, SNCF also continued some major new DC electrification projects, until dual-voltage locomotives were developed in the 1960s.

The main reason why electrification using utility frequency had not been widely adopted before was the lack of reliability of Mercury arc rectifiers that could fit on the train. This in turn related to the requirement to use DC series motors, which required the current to be converted from AC to DC and for that a rectifier is needed. Until the early 1950s, mercury-arc rectifiers were difficult to operate even in ideal conditions and were therefore unsuitable for use in railway locomotives.

It was possible to use AC motors (and some railways did, with varying success), but they have had less than ideal characteristics for traction purposes. This is because control of speed is difficult without varying the frequency and reliance on voltage to control speed gives a torque at any given speed that is not ideal. This is why DC series motors were the most common choice for traction purposes until the 1990s, as they can be controlled by voltage, and have an almost ideal torque vs speed characteristic.

In the 1980s, high-speed trains began to use lighter, lower-maintenance three-phase AC induction motors, and in more recent times, many have begun to use synchronous motors. The N700 Shinkansen, for example, uses a three-level converter to convert 25 kV single-phase AC to 1,520 V AC (via transformer) to 3 kV DC (via a phase-controlled rectifier with thyristors) to a maximum 2,300 V three-phase AC (via a variable voltage, variable frequency inverter using IGBTs with pulse-width modulation) to run permanent magnet synchronous motors. The system works in reverse for regenerative braking.

The choice of 25 kV was related to the efficiency of power transmission as a function of voltage and cost, not based on a neat and tidy ratio of the supply voltage. For a given power level, a higher voltage allows for a lower current and usually better efficiency at the greater cost for high-voltage equipment. It was found that 25 kV was an optimal point, where a higher voltage would still improve efficiency but not by a significant amount in relation to the higher costs incurred by the need for larger insulators and greater clearance from structures.

To avoid short circuits, the high voltage must be protected from moisture. Weather events, such as "the wrong type of snow", have caused failures in the past. An example of atmospheric causes occurred in December 2009, when four Eurostar trains broke down inside the Channel Tunnel.

== Distribution ==
Electric power for 25 kV AC electrification is usually taken directly from the three-phase transmission system. At the transmission substation, a step-down transformer is connected across two of the three phases of the high-voltage supply and lowers the voltage to 25 kV. This is then fed, sometimes several kilometres away, to a railway feeder station located beside the tracks. Switchgear at feeder stations, and at track sectioning cabins located halfway between feeder stations, provides switching to feed the overhead line from adjacent feeder stations if one feeder station loses grid supply.

Since only two phases of the high-voltage supply are used, phase imbalance is corrected by connecting each feeder station to a different combination of phases. To avoid the train pantograph bridging together two feeder stations which may be out-of-phase with each other, neutral sections are provided at feeder stations and track sectioning cabins. Static VAR compensators are used for load balancing and voltage control.

In some cases dedicated single-phase AC power lines were built to substations with single phase AC transformers. Such lines were built to supply the French TGV.

== Standardisation ==
Railway electrification using 25 kV AC has become an international standard. There are three main standards that define the exact voltages allowed:

- EN 50163:2004+A1:2007 – "Railway applications. Supply voltages of traction systems"
- IEC 60850 – "Railway Applications. Supply voltages of traction systems"
- IEC 60038 – "IEC standard voltages"

This system is now part of the European Union's Trans-European railway interoperability standards (1996/48/EC, "Interoperability of the Trans-European high-speed rail system" and 2001/16/EC, "Interoperability of the Trans-European Conventional rail system").

=== 25 kV AC at 60 Hz ===
In countries where the nominal grid frequency is 60 Hz, 25 kV AC at 60 Hz is used for railway electrification.

- In Japan on the Tokaido, San'yō, Kyushu, and Nishi Kyushu Shinkansen lines.
- In South Korea on the Korail network.
- In Taiwan on the Taiwan High Speed Rail line (standard gauge) and on Taiwan Railway's electrified lines (1,067 mm or 3 ft 6 in narrow-gauge).
- In the United States on newer electrified portions of the Northeast Corridor (i.e. the New Haven-Boston segment) intercity passenger lines, New Jersey Transit commuter lines, Denver RTD Commuter Rail, Caltrain, and select isolated short lines.
- Haramain High Speed Railway in Saudi Arabia.

=== Permissible voltage deviations ===
The permissible range of voltages allowed are as stated in the standards and take into account the number of trains drawing current and their distance from the substation.

Electrification system	Voltage				
Electrification system	Minimum		Nominal	Maximum	
Electrification system	Instantaneous	Permanent	Nominal	Permanent	Instantaneous
25 kV; 50 or 60 Hz	17.5 kV	19 kV	25 kV	27.5 kV	29 kV

== 2 × 25 kV autotransformer system ==
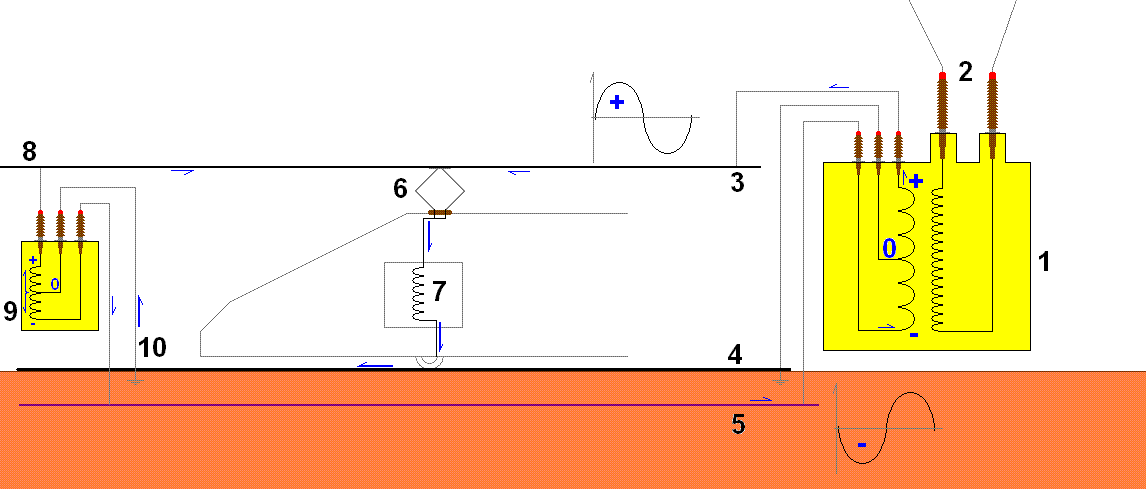
1. Supply transformer; 2. Power supply; 3. Overhead line; 4. Running rail; 5. Feeder line; 6. Pantograph; 7. Locomotive transformer; 8. Overhead line; 9. Autotransformer; 10. Running rail

The 2 × 25 kV autotransformer system is a split-phase electric power system which supplies 25 kV power to the trains, but transmits power at 50 kV to reduce energy losses. It should not be confused with the 50 kV system. In this system, the current is mainly carried between the overhead line and a feeder transmission line instead of the rail. The overhead line (3) and feeder (5) are on opposite phases so the voltage between them is 50 kV, while the voltage between the overhead line (3) and the running rails (4) remains at 25 kV. Periodic autotransformers (9) divert the return current from the neutral rail, step it up, and send it along the feeder line.

This system was initially deployed on San'yō Shinkansen in Japan in 1972 and in Paris-Lyon High speed rail line in France in 1981, and has gone on to be used by New Zealand Railways in 1988, Indian Railways, Russian Railways, Italian High Speed Railways, UK High Speed 1, most of the West Coast Main Line and Crossrail, French lines (LGV lines and some other lines), most Spanish high-speed rail lines, Amtrak and some of the Finnish and Hungarian lines.

Diagram of New Haven system forerunner of 2 × 25 kV system

The 2 × 25 system traces its roots back in the upgrading of the electrification of the New York, New Haven and Hartford Railroad which was electrified in 1907 and upgraded in 1914. The line was initially electrified with 11 kV 25 Hz system and then upgraded as a "2 × 11 kV" system (but it was never named in this way).

Although the railroad considered the 1907 electrification highly successful, two problems required an ultimate redesign of the transmission system. The first was electromagnetic interference in adjacent, parallel telegraph and telephone wires caused by the high currents in the traction power system.

The second was that the system's geographic growth and the evolving state of electrical technology created a need for higher transmission voltages. The railroad could have simply raised the operating voltage of the entire system, however this would have required all the catenary insulators to be upgraded to withstand a higher potential, and replacement of all the locomotive high voltage equipment. And while higher transmission voltages had become common in the seven years since the initial electrification, generators were still limited to a maximum output voltage of around 11 kV.

The solution decided upon by the railroad, after several years of study, was a balanced autotransformer system.

== Variations ==
For TGV world speed record runs in France the 25 kV voltage was temporarily boosted, to 31 kV.

== Multi-system locomotives and trains ==
Trains that can operate on multiple voltages, such as 3 kV and 25 kV, are established technologies. Some locomotives in Europe are capable of using as many as four different voltage standards.

== See also ==
- 15 kV AC railway electrification
- Three-phase AC railway electrification
- List of railway electrification systems
- Rotary phase converter
