= Gagarin, Russia =

Gagarin (Russian: Гагарин; masculine) or Gagarina (Гагарина; feminine, or masculine genitive) is the name of several inhabited localities in Russia.

Urban localities

- Gagarin, Smolensk Oblast, a town in Gagarinsky District of Smolensk Oblast

Rural localities

- Gagarin, Vologda Oblast, a pochinok in Terebayevsky Selsoviet of Nikolsky District in Vologda Oblast
- Gagarina, Krasnoyarsk Krai, a settlement in Petropavlovsky Selsoviet of Abansky District in Krasnoyarsk Krai
- Gagarina, Tyumen Oblast, a village in Berdyuzhsky Rural Okrug of Berdyuzhsky District in Tyumen Oblast
