= VMH 1-4 =

Series of locomotives

VMH 1-4 was a series of locomotives built by Hohenzollern, with serial numbers 2835 to 2838, for the Stoomtramweg-Maatschappij Venlo – Maasbree – Helden (VMH) in 1911. They entered service in 1912, named VENLO, PANNINGEN, HELDEN, and MAASBREE.

== Description ==
A condenser with four pipes of diameter 152 mm and a length of 3150 mm was part of the locomotive equipment. It was removed at a later date. At the absorption of the VMH into the Limburgsche Tramweg Maatschappij (LTM) in 1923 the locomotives were numbered 13-16.

== History ==
The MBS purchased all former VMH lines and equipment of the LTM in 1929. These locomotive retained their numbers at that time. The name plate of VMH 1 VENLO was placed on VMH 5 (LTM 17).

In 1935 the passenger service on the line Venlo-Beringen was terminated and the locomotives were taken out of service. Locomotives 13, 15 and 16 were sold for scrap in 1937. Locomotive 14 remained, without axles, wheels, and driving rods in the workshops of the MBS in Gennep. It was used as heating boiler.

Although during the war between 1940 and 1945 there were plans to restore the locomotive to full service, these were not executed. The locomotive was lost without a trace during the war activities of the liberation of The Netherlands in 1944–1945.
