= Seebach-Wettingen railway electrification trial =

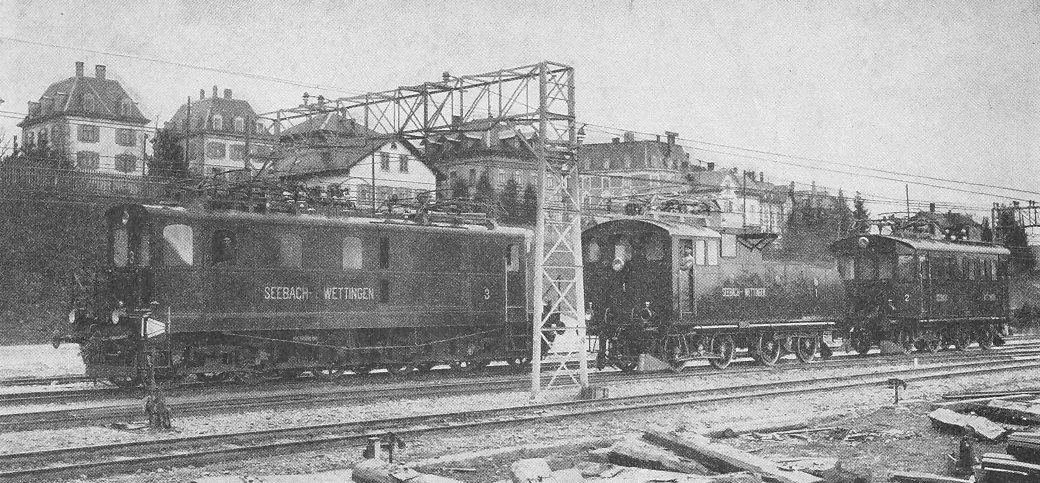
Locomotives of the pilot scheme: left, number 3 from Siemens-Schuckert, then the Oerlikon-built machines 1 and 2

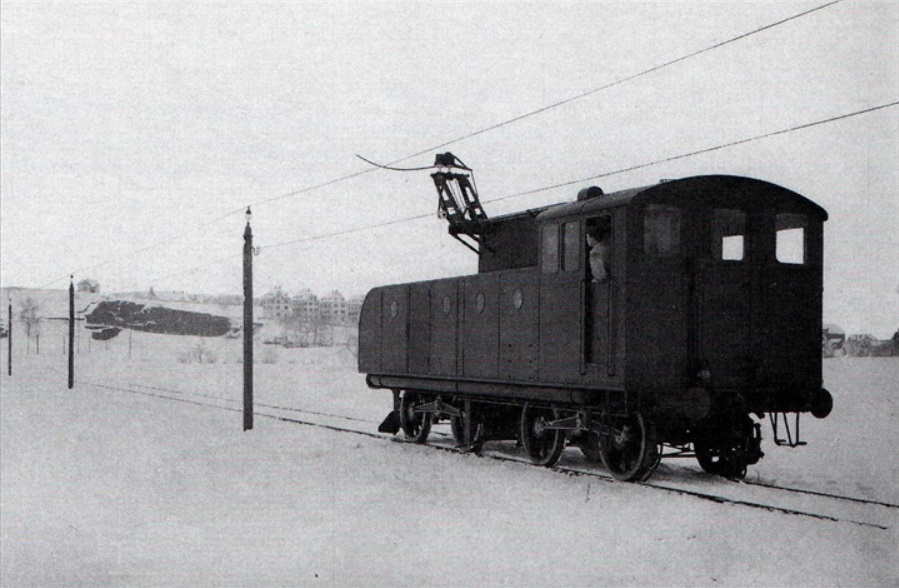
Locomotive number 1

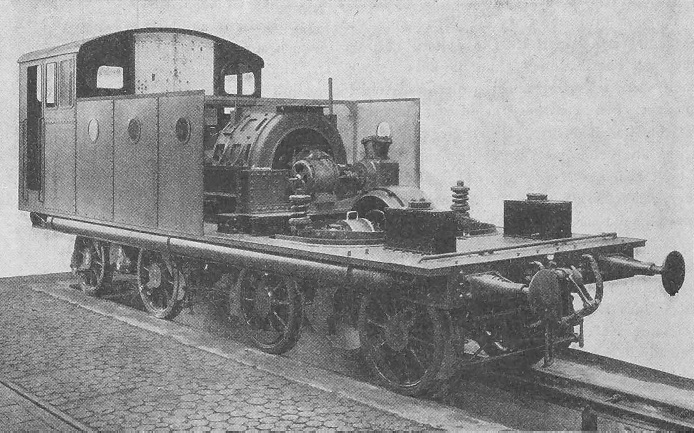
Locomotive number 1, partially dismantled

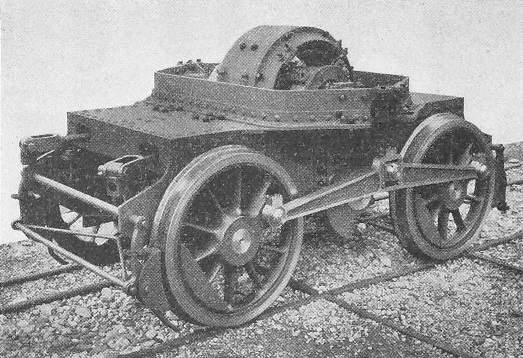
Bogie of the type used on Locomotives 1 and 2

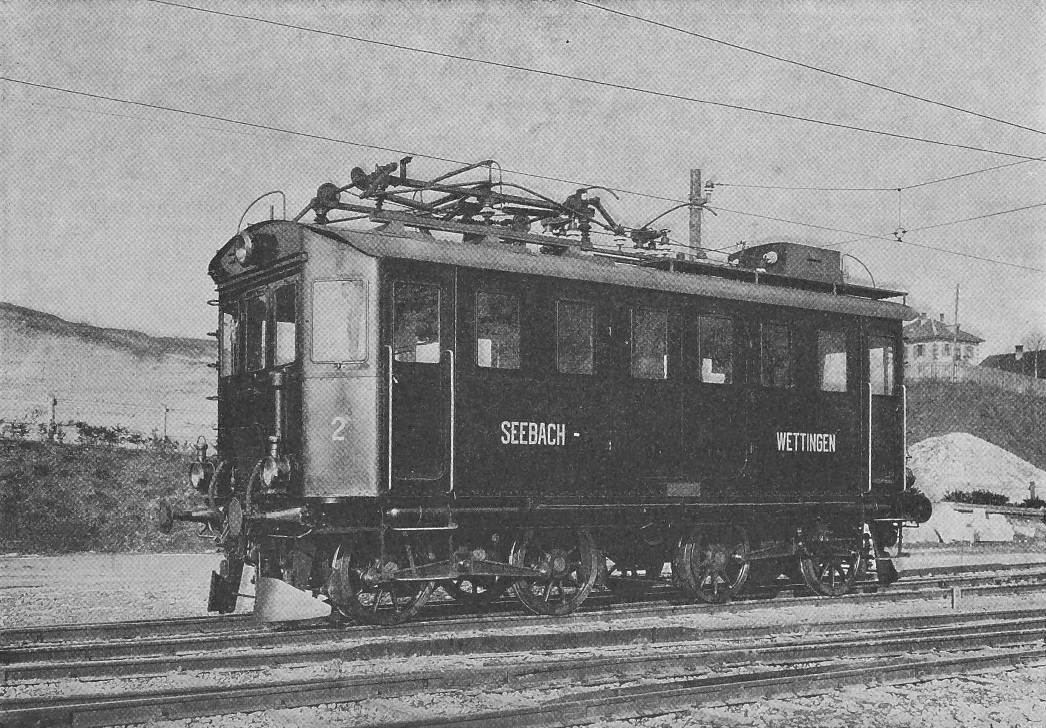
Locomotive number 2

The Seebach-Wettingen railway electrification trial (1905-1909) was an important milestone in the development of electric railways. Maschinenfabrik Oerlikon (MFO) demonstrated the suitability of single-phase alternating current at high voltage for long-distance railway operation with the Seebach-Wettingen single-phase alternating current test facility. For this purpose, MFO electrified the 19.45-kilometre-long Swiss Federal Railways (SBB) route from Seebach to Wettingen at its own expense with single-phase alternating current at 15,000 volts.

== Overview ==
By 1900, the use of direct current (DC), usually at 500-600 volts, to supply power to electric trams and trains was well-established. Examples include Trams in Budapest (from 1887) and the Liverpool Overhead Railway (opened 1893). This was satisfactory for urban systems but, for long distance railways, a higher voltage was desirable to reduce energy losses. The 106 km Valtellina line in Italy was electrified using three-phase alternating current (AC) at 3,000 volts and opened on 4 September 1902. The system was designed by Kálmán Kandó and a team from the Ganz Works in Budapest. This was an advance but the three-phase system had disadvantages. Two overhead wires were required and this limited the voltage because the two wires had to cross at junctions. The use of single-phase AC, which only required one overhead wire, had been held back by the lack of suitable motors. The three-phase system used induction motors but the single-phase universal motor was in its infancy and problems were experienced with overheating and excessive sparking at the commutator.

The Seebach-Wettingen trial used two different approaches. The first was to supply power at the standard 50 Hz mains frequency and use a rotary converter on the locomotive to convert this to direct current for the traction motors. The second was to use a low-frequency (15 Hz) supply to power universal motors on the locomotive. It was expected that the low frequency would minimise the overheating and sparking problems and this was the case.

The test track was operated between 1905 and 1909 and provided evidence for the construction of overhead line and pantograph types to allow operation with a voltage of 15,000. Because of the high voltage, the wooden passenger coaches were provided with a device that protected the passengers from the consequences of contact with drooping overhead lines.

== Experimental operation at 50 hertz ==
At the suggestion of MFO, the Swiss Federal Railways (SBB) agreed on 31 May 1902 to set up a trial operation on the Seebach-Wettingen route with single-phase alternating current at 15,000 volts. This system allowed a higher overhead line voltage than usual at this time, and thus a greater distance between substations, and a single-wire instead of a two-wire overhead line as was then successfully in use on three-phase routes in northern Italy.

Since the traction motors could not yet be operated with single-phase alternating current with the technology of the time, MFO first built the four-axle pilot locomotive No. 1 with a rotary converter, which converted the overhead line voltage of 15,000 volts AC into direct current for the operation of the traction motors. The rotary converter system was patented, patent US754565 of 1904.

Before the start of operation of the test track, the electrification of the approximately 700-metre-long connecting track of their factory premises with the station at Seebach was completed by MFO and tests with the converter locomotive were started. On 16 January 1905, the regular test runs between Seebach and Affoltern were started with a timetable set by SBB. For these trips, until 10 November 1905, the converter locomotive No. 1 was used.

== Experimental operation at 15 hertz ==
Operation with the converter locomotive did not continue for long. In the summer of 1904, MFO introduced locomotive number 2, with alternating current motors, but using 15 instead of 50 hertz. Thanks to the reduced frequency, as well as the compensation winding, the single-phase series motor developed by Hans Behn-Eschenburg at MFO had similar characteristics to a direct-current motor and sparking at the commutator was greatly reduced.

The 50 Hertz overhead line led to strong interference on the telephone line from Zurich to Baden, which ran parallel to the railway line. The reduction in frequency to 15 hertz led to an improvement. Modification of the motors and the use of twisted pair wiring on the telephone line caused the interference to cease.

Despite the different electrical equipment, the mechanical parts of locomotives numbers 1 and 2 were similar, except that number 2 had two driver's cabs. The power supply was changed on 11 November 1905 from 50 Hertz to 15 Hertz and locomotive No. 2 took over the train operation. So that locomotive No. 1 could continue to be used, it was rebuilt with 15 Hz AC motors, to match No. 2, and the converter was removed. The two locomotives became the model for the low-frequency AC powered locomotives, as they were built until the 1970s, in Germany, Austria, Switzerland, Norway and Sweden. On 2 June 1906, the trial operation was extended to Regensdorf.

For financial reasons, MFO accepted a proposal from Siemens-Schuckert to participate in further experiments with a third locomotive. Locomotive No. 3 was delivered on 3 August 1907 but failed on 7 October 1907 with overheating problems.

== Power generation ==
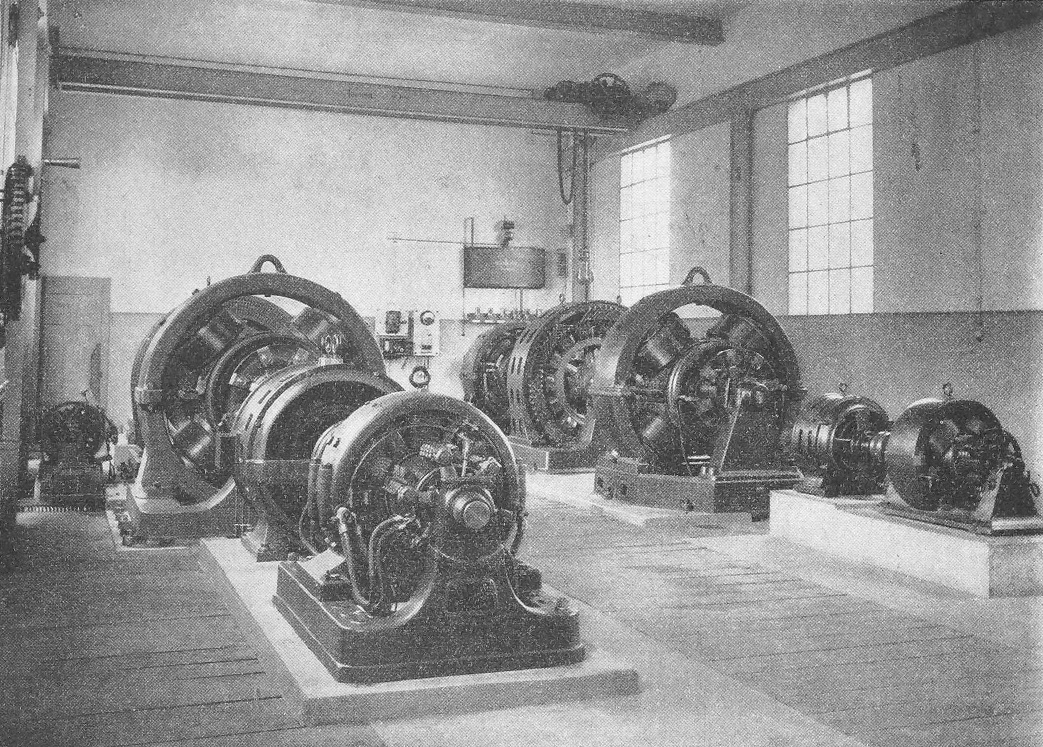
Interior view of the converter station

At Maschinenfabrik Oerlikon, a small steam power plant was built to supply the energy needed for the Seebach-Wettingen line. The tubular boilers in which the steam was produced for the turbine had a heating surface of 300 m² each and an output of 18,000 kilograms of steam per hour. The three-stage steam turbine ran at 3000 revolutions per minute. The three-phase current produced had a voltage of 230 volts and a frequency of 50 hertz to match the factory's existing power plant. The converter station with AC buffering was housed in a special building, which was located near the steam turbine plant. The two converter groups had a capacity of 700 and 500 kilowatts. The 375 element backup battery had a capacity of 592 ampere hours. Next to the engine room was the transformer room, in which four transformers increased the voltage of the single-phase current from 700 to 15,000 volts. The exact layout of the converter station is unclear but the presence of the batteries suggests that it used a back-to-back connection. The three phase AC would have been converted to DC and then the DC converted to single phase AC.

== Catenary ==
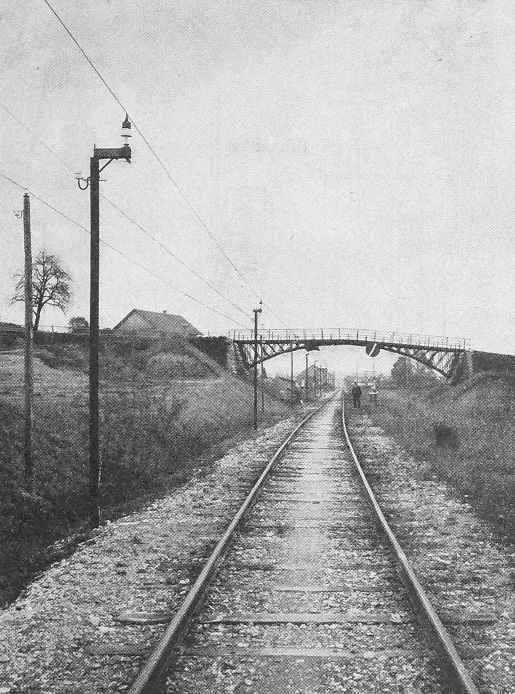
Overhead line (MFO system) at Seebach

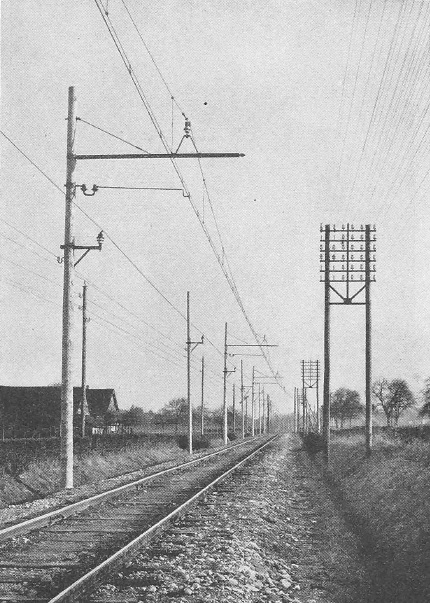
Overhead lines, MFO system and Siemens-Schuckert system running parallel

Seebach to Regensdorf

On the section from Seebach to Regensdorf, MFO tested an overhead line at the side of the track. The current collector mounted on the roof of the locomotive, the so-called tail, consisted of a slightly curved tube with a replaceable contact strip. The tube was pressed by spring force against the contact wire and could describe more than a half circle, so that contact with the contact wire from above, from the side or from below was possible. Normally, the wire was located at the side of the track. The system proved unreliable at speeds above 50 km/hour.

Regensdorf to Wettingen

On the section from Regensdorf to Wettingen, Siemens-Schuckert installed a standard catenary and, on 1 December 1907, operation was started. At the exit from Regensdorf station, the overhead line ran approximately 400 metres parallel to the side-mounted line so that the current collector could be changed while driving. The contact wire was located six metres above the rail above the middle of the track. To test a low contact wire height in tunnels and underpasses, the contact wire between Otelfingen and Würenlos was laid only 4.8 meters above the rails over a distance of one kilometre. The pantograph (current collector) was usable for both directions of travel and could follow height differences of the overhead line even at high speeds. The lifting of the pantograph was done by compressed air.

== After the trial ==
From 4 July 1909, the Seebach-Wettingen line was again operated with steam traction and the overhead lines were dismantled. Because it was a secondary line with easy gradients, SBB did not consider it economical for electric operation. Locomotives No. 1 and 2 were stored and, in 1919, were sold to SBB. Locomotive No. 3 returned to Berlin and was converted there into a DC locomotive. In 1944 it was destroyed in a bombing raid.

Despite the cessation of operations, the attempt was successful. In 1907, MFO supplied railcars BCFe 4/4 to the Maggiatalbahn for operation at 5000 volts, 20 Hertz. In July 1910, the Bernese Alpine Railway Company Bern - Lötschberg - Simplon (BLS) opened its Spiez-Frutigen test track electrified at 15,000 Volts, 15 Hertz. In 1913, Prussia, Bavaria and Baden jointly defined a traction current frequency of 16 2/3 Hz, whereupon the BLS also adopted this frequency. On 15 July 1913, the BLS started continuous operation between Spiez and Brig using 15,000 volts, 16 2/3 Hertz. In the same year, the Rhaetian Railway opened its Engadine line using 16 2/3 Hertz, but with a voltage of 11,000 volts. From 7 July 1919, the SBB operated their feeder line from Bern-Thun to Lötschbergstrecke using 15,000 volts, 16 2/3 Hertz and from 28 May 1922, the trains on the Gotthard route of the SBB began to operate electrically.

== See also ==
- 15 kV AC railway electrification
- Three-phase AC railway electrification
