= Yury Lomonosov =

Russian railway engineer (1876–1952)

Yury Vladimirovich Lomonosov
- Юрий Владимирович Ломоносов
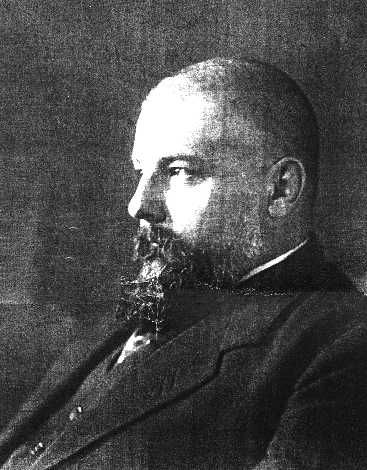
- Born: 24 April 1876; Gzhatsk (now Gagarin), Russia
- Died: 19 November 1952 (aged 76); Montreal, Canada
- Known for: First operational diesel locomotive

Yury Vladimirovich Lomonosov (Russian: Юрий Владимирович Ломоносов; 24 April 1876 – 19 November 1952) was a Russian railway engineer and a leading figure in the development of Russian Railways in the early 20th century. He was best known for design and construction of the world's first operationally successful mainline diesel locomotive, the E el-2. This was completed in 1924 and went into service in 1925. In the late 1920s, Lomonosov immigrated to Europe and later became a British citizen.

In his homeland, he is best known for being a member of the Bolshevik Party, during the February Revolution, stopping the Tsar's Train heading to Tsarskoe Selo. This predicted the abdication of the throne, the end of the monarchical Russian Empire and the victory of the revolution.

== Early years ==
Lomonosov was born in 1876 in Gzhatsk (now Gagarin), a town in Smolensk Oblast of Russia. His father Vladimir Grigorievich Lomonosov was a former cavalry officer who worked as a judge since 1870. His mother Maria Fedorovna Lomonosova (née Pegelau) was a housewife known for establishing a public library.

In 1887 following the family tradition, Lomonosov entered the Moscow 1st Cadet Corps. However, he then decided to abandon his military career in favor of engineering. In 1893 Lomonosov passed the entrance exam and started his studies at the St. Petersburg Institute of Communications. After graduation, he worked at Kharkiv Locomotive Plant and then, in October 1898, became assistant director of the depot of the Kharkiv-Mykolaiv railways. In 1898 he started designing and testing locomotives which became the occupation of his life. In 1899 he was offered a teaching position at the Warsaw Polytechnic Institute where he taught a course on the theory and management of locomotives. In the meantime, the Russian Ministry of Communications approved him for the position of Inspector of the Russian State and Private Railways.

== Personal life ==
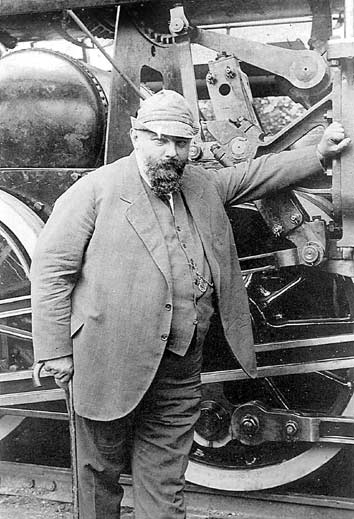
Yury Lomonosov

In May 1897 Lomonosov married Sofya Alexandrovna Antonovich, the daughter of railway constructor A. I. Antonovich. On their honeymoon, the couple visited Germany, Belgium, Britain and Sweden. Their relations became cold toward 1907 when Sophia Alexandrovna went to Switzerland to study medicine, taking their children with her. Her departure put an end to their marriage. Lomonosov's secretary Raisa Rosen took care of his home and later in August 1908 became his wife. They had a son Yuri who was born in Nikopol and worked most of his life in Britain.

== Work in Kiev ==
In 1902 Lomonosov became a professor at the Kiev Polytechnic Institute. Later, with a group of 100 students he was sent to inspect the Chinese Eastern Railways (CER) for the purpose of their reconstruction. During the trip, he visited numerous cities of the Far East including Irkutsk, Harbin, Port Arthur, Vladivostok, as well as some cities in Japan (Nagasaki) and China (Beijing). The results of the expedition were partly reported in a meeting with the Minister of Finances Sergei Witte, with whom Lomonosov openly talked about theft and corruption at the CER. This meeting reinforced the image of Lomonosov as an honest and uncompromising public official.

During his stay at Kyiv Polytechnic Institute, Lomonosov joined the rapidly growing socialist movement and became an avid Marxist. He however, did not join the Communist Party which hindered many of his further appointments after the October Revolution. As inspector at the Russian Railways, Lomonosov often traveled abroad to get acquainted with experience of the organization of transport in other countries. In November 1902 he attended the International Congress of Railway Transport Engineers, held in Vienna, where he became acquainted with the work of Austrian and Hungarian engineers. In the spring of 1903 he also visited Italy, Switzerland, France and Spain.

In April 1905 Lomonosov defended his habilitation on the dynamics of locomotives and became the youngest full professor of the institute. In December 1907 he was appointed head of the locomotive section of St. Catherine's railroads. During this period, he became convinced of the futility of steam engines and concluded that the future belongs to the more fuel-efficient locomotives with internal combustion engines. In 1909 he started to design the engine-oil tankers with a friction-based transmission (from the diesel engine to the driving axle). In July 1914 the Ministry of Railways has approved his design and allocated funds for the production of 2 locomotives, but the project was halted by World War I.

During these years, Lomonosov became a recognized authority in the field of locomotive equipment in Russia and headed a department at the Kyiv Polytechnic Institute. He had launched the theory of traction locomotives and developed the scientific basis for the exploitation of railways that was summarized in 2 books published in 1912: "Traction calculation and application of graphic methods to them", and "Scientific problems of railway operation ". Together with his students, in 1908 Lomonosov formed the first research institute devoted to locomotives – "The office of the experimentation over the types of engines", which was converted after the October Revolution to the "Experimental Institute of Communications".

== In Soviet Russia ==
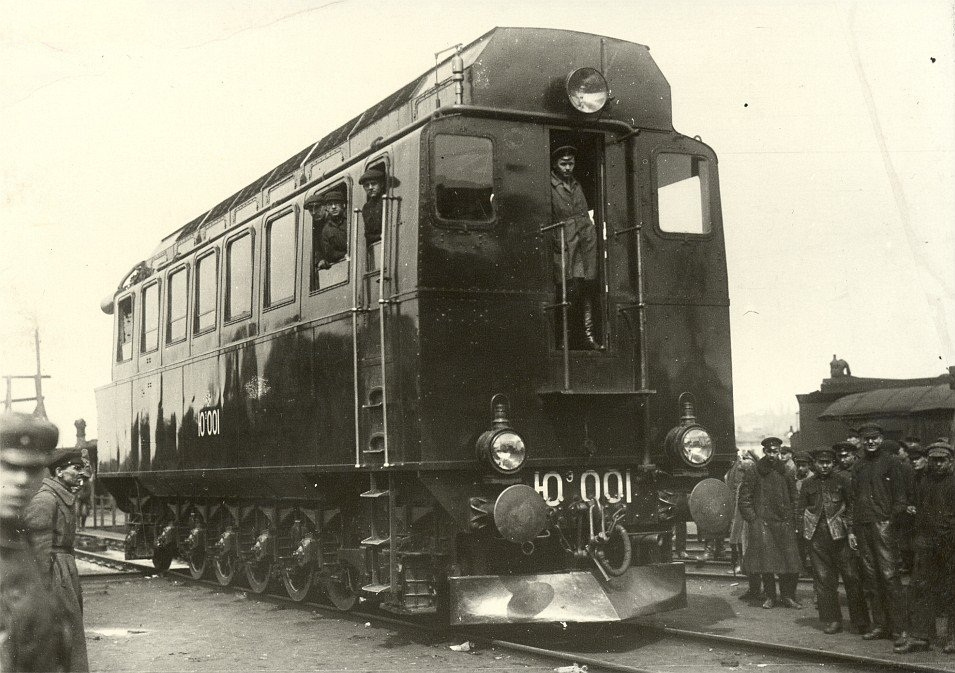
The Юэ 001 locomotive

In June 1917 the Provisional Government sent Lomonosov to the U.S. diplomatic mission, as a representative of the Ministry of Railways. There he learned about the October Revolution in Russia. In Autumn 1919, he returned to Russia because the Americans decided to suspend their sales of engines to Soviet Russia. In November 1920, Lomonosov was appointed to the Council of People's Commissars as responsible for rail orders abroad. In this function, he went to Berlin where in 1920–1923 he had organized the purchase of German and Swedish locomotives for Russia.

During this time, Lomonosov did not stop his engineering and scientific activities. From 1923 to 1924 he took on a task of creating the first Russian diesel engine with electric transmission. Using his administrative skills, Lomonosov assembled a creative team of engineers and scientists who managed to design and build a prototype as early as in Spring 1924. The locomotive passed all State tests and examinations and in February 1925 was officially listed under number Юэ 001 at the Soviet railways. Although several other prototype designs were constructed much earlier and in different countries, this locomotive is considered as the world's first operationally successful mainline diesel locomotive.

== Life abroad ==
Between 1924 and 1925, Lomonosov lived and worked in Berlin, sending reports on his communications with German locomotive plants. Despite being recognized as the father of the first Russian diesel locomotive, his popularity among the Soviet politicians had declined. During this period, Lomonosov decided not to return to the Soviet Union. He continued publishing books and began working as a consultant and a teacher. Several factors, including insufficient knowledge of German and English, his relatively low popularity and Soviet origin, hindered his professional employment since then – Lomonosov hardly ever regained the popularity and work possibilities that he had had in Russia. Between 1927 and 1948, he moved around several countries in Europe and the United States, taking various temporal positions and projects. In Britain, he collaborated with a talented physicist Pyotr Kapitsa; in particular, they unsuccessfully tried to obtain a patent on an electromechanical brake system for a locomotive.

In 1938 Lomonosov and his wife Raisa took British citizenship. In 1948–1950, together with his son Yuri, he went to the U.S. to visit friends and then moved to Canada, where he died after a brief illness.

== Bibliography ==
- Heywood, Anthony (1999). Modernising Lenin's Russia: Economic Reconstruction, Foreign Trade, and the Railways 1917–1924. New York: Cambridge University Press. ISBN 0-521-62178-X.
