= Gagarin, Vologda Oblast =

Gagarin Гагарин
- Village
- Location within Vologda Oblast Location within Russia
- Coordinates: 59°39′N 45°22′E
- Country: Russia
- Region: Vologda Oblast
- District: Nikolsky District
- Time zone: UTC+3:00

Gagarin (Russian: Гагарин) is a rural locality (a village) in Terebayevskoye Rural Settlement, Nikolsky District, Vologda Oblast, Russia. The population was 4 as of 2002.

== Geography ==
The distance to Nikolsk is 13 km (8.1 mi), to Terebayevo is 5 km (3.1 mi). Burakovo is the nearest rural locality.
