= Hans Behn-Eschenburg =

Swiss engineer (1864–1938)

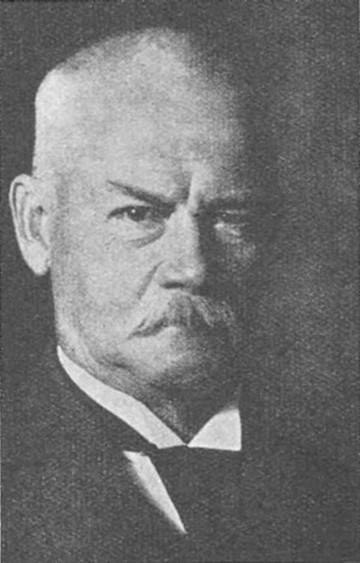

Hans Behn-Eschenburg (10 January 1864 – 18 May 1938) was a Swiss engineer.

== Biography ==
Behn-Eschenburg was born in Obertrass (now Zürich), Switzerland. His work on the AC single-phase motor was important to the electrification of railways.

He studied mathematics and physics in Zürich and Berlin between 1886 and 1890. In 1892, Behn-Eschenburg worked at Maschinenfabrik Oerlikon, where he became chief electrician (1897–1911), director (1911–1913), director General Technical (1913–1928) and Administrative Counselor (1919-1938). Oerlikon was prominent in the construction of single-phase motors with commutators for traction. He died on 18 May 1938 in Küsnacht.

His work focussed on alternating current technology, including the asynchronous motor and the AC single-phase motor. which marked a major turning point in the electrification of railways.

Behn-Eschenburg gave his name to a vector diagram for synchronous reactance.
