= Kryšpín's system =

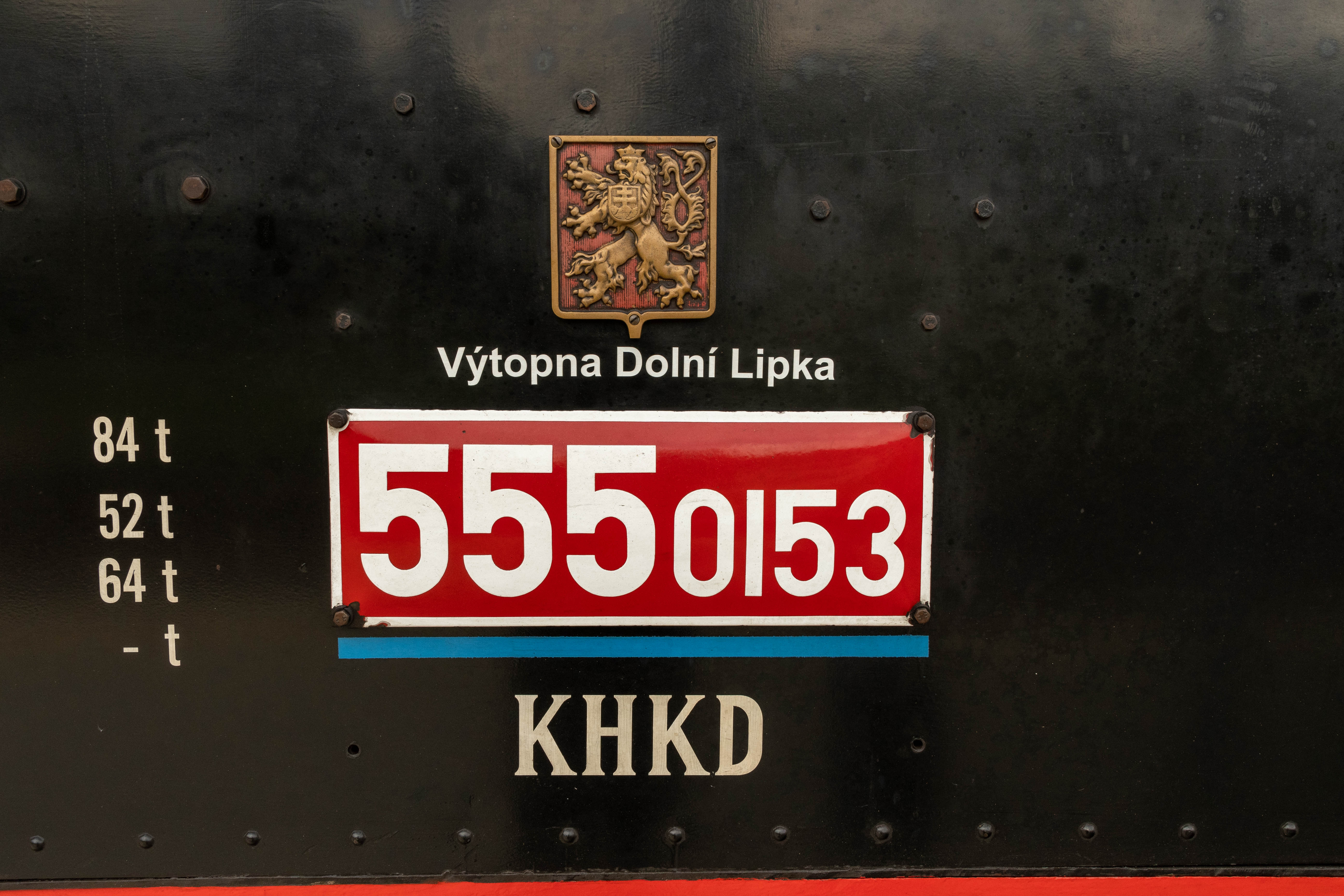
Sign with locomotive number in Kryšpín's system

Kryšpín's system refers to the locomotive class nomenclature used in Czechoslovakia from September 1923 to the late 1980s. It is named after Ing. Vojtěch Kryšpín, director of one of the Czechoslovak locomotive manufacturers, who invented the system. It was accepted in September 1923 by the decree of the Ministry of Railways under reference number 54 024/v/3-23.

== Standard gauge vehicles ==
For standard gauge vehicles, the class name had the form Y ASW.GNNN. Here Y is the type of the vehicle:

- Y is missing: steam locomotives
- A: draisines, track motor cars; later used for accumulator locomotives
- E: DC current electrical locomotives
- S: AC current electrical locomotives
- ES: electrical locomotives capable of using both AC and DC current.
- EM: DC electrical railway motor cars
- SM: AC electrical railway motor cars
- T: diesel locomotives
- TL: gas-turbine locomotives
- M: railway motor cars
- ET, TA: hybrid locomotives

A is the number of live or coupled axles. S marks the maximum speed in km/h. It is constructed as (max. speed - 30 km/h) div 10 km/h. For example, if the maximum speed is 100 km/h, S = (100-30)/10 = 7. If the maximum speed exceeds 120 km/h, 9 is used. If it is less than 30 km/h, 0 is used. W+10 is the weight per live or coupled axle in metric tonnes. For example, W=8 means the vehicle has 18 tonnes per live or coupled axle.

G is the so-called design-group. As you can see from the above explanation, even very different vehicles can have the same Y ASW. G is used to distinguish between various designs with the same number of live axles, maximum speed and weight. For example, 464.1 and 464.2 were totally different designs.

NNN is the "serial" number - it is 001 for the first locomotive of class Y ASW.G produced, 002 for the second one and so on.

== Narrow gauge vehicles ==
For narrow gauge vehicles, the class had the form Y AW.GNNN where Y was one of the following

- U: narrow gauge steam locomotives
- TU: narrow gauge diesel locomotives
- MU: narrow gauge railway motor cars
- EMU: DC electric narrow gauge railway motor cars

All other symbols had the same meaning as for the standard gauge vehicles.

== Examples ==
- 310 a steam locomotive, 3 live or coupled axles, max. speed 40 km/h or less, 10 tonnes or less per live or coupled axle
- 498 a steam locomotive, 4 live or coupled axles, max. speed 120 km/h or greater, 18 tonnes per live or coupled axle
- T478 a diesel locomotive, 4 live or coupled axles, max. speed 100 km/h, 18 tonnes per live or coupled axle
- ES499 an electric locomotive capable of using both AC and DC current, 4 live or coupled axles, max. speed 120 km/h or greater, 19 or more tonnes per live or coupled axle.
- TU47 a diesel locomotive, narrow gauge, 4 live or coupled axles, 17 tonnes per live or coupled axle.

== Notes on electrification systems used in Czechoslovakia ==
Czechoslovakia (and the Czech Republic and the Slovak Republic as its descendants) used two different main railway electrification systems. The railways in the north part of the country are electrified with 3000 V DC, while south is electrified with 25 kV AC, 50 Hz. This has historical reasons. Massive electrification started in 1950s when AC locomotives were difficult to build. However, as technology advanced, AC locomotives became easier to build and the AC current was used because it is more economical. Before the massive electrification started in 1950s, other systems were also used, including three-phase current. Nowadays, the only line in the Czech Republic with such a system remaining is Tábor-Bechyně using 1500 V DC. The E class refers both to the 3000 V DC and 1500 V locomotives.

- http://droopy.czweb.org/index.php?kapitola=6

== Literature ==
- Palát, Hynek (2011). "Označování parních lokomotiv". Parní lokomotivy ČSD (in Czech). Brno: Computer Press. pp. 62–65. ISBN 978-80-251-3641-6.
