= Soviet locomotive class E el-2 =

Early German-built Russian diesel–electric locomotive

E el-2 (Ээл2) diesel–electric locomotive
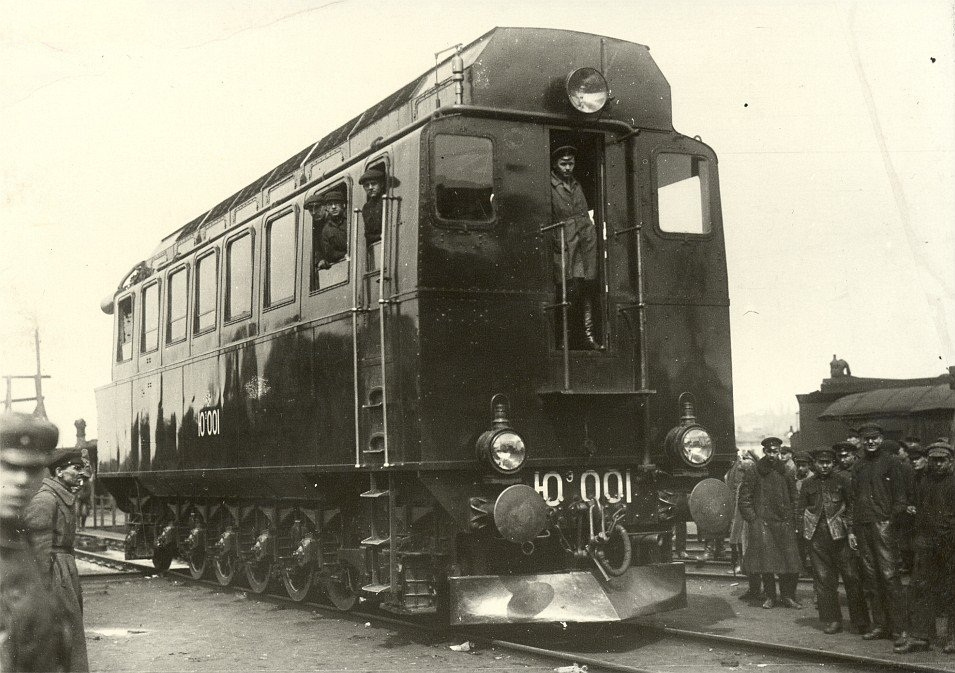
- The sole E el-2 locomotive was built in Germany in 1924 for the Soviet Union
Type and origin
- Power type: Diesel–electric
- Builder: Hohenzollern Locomotive Works; Maschinenfabrik Esslingen
- Build date: 1924
- Total produced: 1
Specifications
- Configuration
  - Whyte: 2-10-2DE
  - AAR: 1-E-1
  - UIC: 1′Eo1′
- Prime mover: MAN diesel engine
- Transmission: Diesel–electric
Performance figures
- Power output: Diesel: 883 kW (1,184 hp); Motors: 800 kW (1,100 hp)
Career
- Numbers: 001 (only)
- Retired: 1954

The E el-2 (Cyrillic script: Ээл2) was a Soviet diesel–electric locomotive designed by Yury Lomonosov and built in Germany. The work was started by Hohenzollern Locomotive Works in Germany, but for political reasons it was later transferred to Maschinenfabrik Esslingen. The locomotive was completed in 1924 and in January 1925 it was transferred to the USSR and presented to the press and officials. It spent the remainder of that year on several USSR mainline routes then worked mostly between Moscow and Kursk. Later it was moved to Ashkhabad (Ashgabat) in Turkmenistan. Despite some technical troubles in its early years, it underwent several modifications and lasted until 1954, running about 1,000,000 kilometres (620,000 mi) in total.

== Powertrain ==
The prime mover was an MAN submarine-type diesel engine, weighing 26 t (25.6 long tons; 28.7 short tons), and there were five traction motors, one for each driving axle. A semi-flexible coupling was installed between the diesel engine and the generator.
