= Keith Heller =

Canadian transport executive (born 1948)

Keith L. Heller
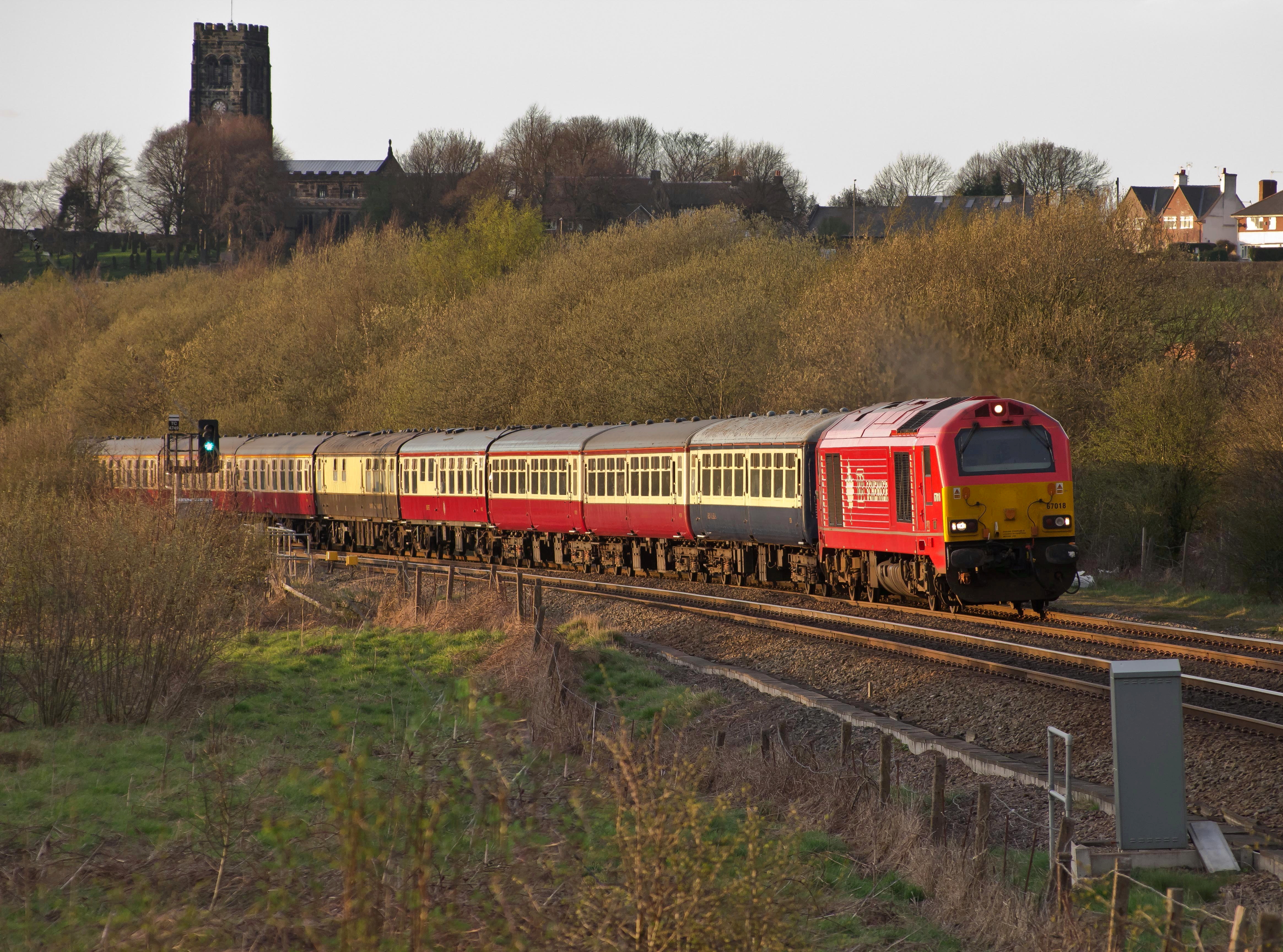
- DB Cargo UK Class 67 locomotive named after Keith Heller, with maple leaf on the side
- Born: Keith Louis Heller; 3 April 1948 (age 78); Ontario, Canada
- Occupations: Senior vice-president Canadian National Railway; Chief-Executive English Welsh & Scottish Railway; Co-Chairman of DB Schenker Rail; Director UK Coal
- Years active: 1960s–
- Spouse: Dolores Smith
- Children: 3

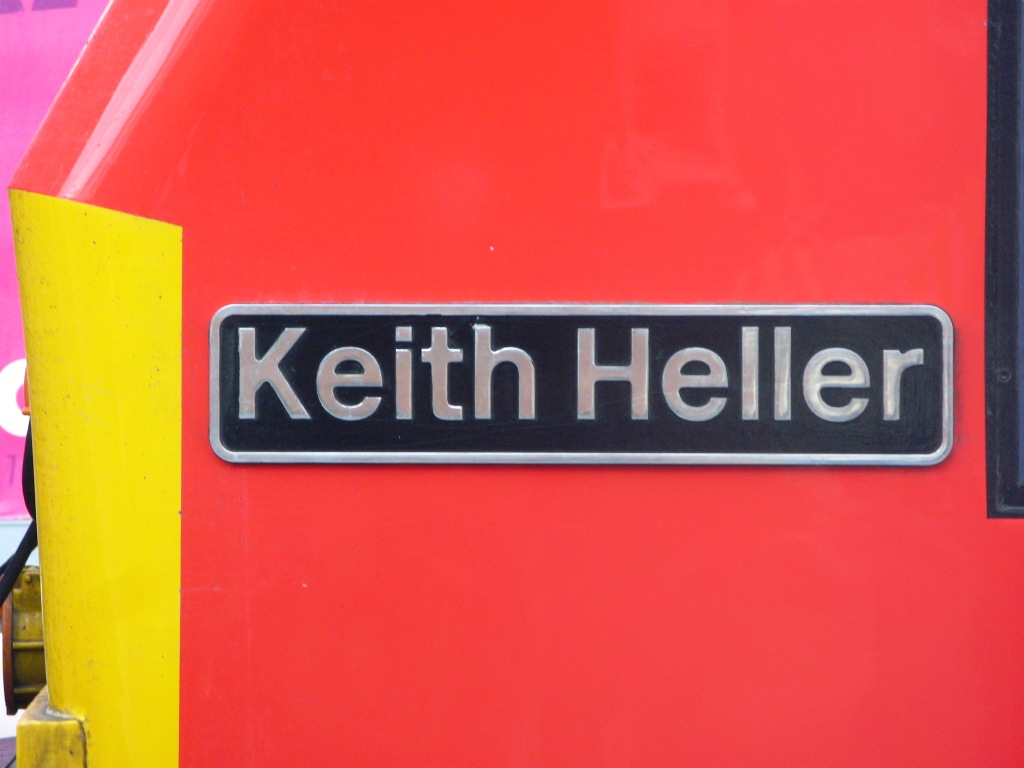
Keith Heller nameplate on 67018 in 2010

Keith Louis Heller (born 3 April 1948) is a Canadian transport executive in the rail freight transport industry. In 2005 he was ranked 57 in the Power 100 listing published by Country Life magazine. Heller is notable for having run major rail freight providers in both North America and Europe.

Heller was head of the Eastern Region of the Canadian National Railway, at the time the most successful privatised rail business in the world. In 2004, he moved to Europe and became chief executive of English Welsh & Scottish Railway, the largest rail freight operator in the United Kingdom, and subsequently DB Schenker Rail co-chairman and head of the Western Region, covering rail freight across Great Britain, France, Spain and Portugal.

== Personal life ==
Heller's parents Lorne Nelson Heller and Mildred Sophia Heller (née Schweitzer) married on 10 November 1945 and subsequently jointly ran a hardware store called "Rural Hardware" from 1953 to 1992. Keith Heller grew up on his father's farm in Ontario and attended Elmira District Secondary School. He was the oldest child. Heller married Dolores Smith, and together they had one son, who remains living in Canada. He also has two children from a previous marriage who reside in Canada.

== Career ==
Heller's first job whilst still at school was working as a baggage porter.

=== Canada ===
Heller began with Canadian National Railway (CN) in 1966. By the end of 1993, he had become chief of transportation for CN's North American. In May 1997 CN removed one layer of management and so Heller moved from senior vice-president, CN East, to be senior vice-president, Line Operations. Following the merger between CN and Illinois Central Railroad, CN was split into five regions, and in May 1999 Heller was placed in control of the largest division, the new Eastern Canada Region, described as covering an area the size of Europe. Heller had the reputation of a hard-hitter, with aggressive determination.

In 2001 Heller enabled the sale of ten kilometres (6 mi) of city-centre tracks connecting the Michigan Central Railway Bridge through Niagara Falls, Ontario, following diversion of Canadian Pacific Railway trains via CN's International Railway Bridge on 11 December 2001.

On 14 February 2003 Heller with another CN executive, Scott Roberts, held a meeting with Gordon McGuinty of the Notre Development Corporation discussing potential plans to use the Adams Mine in Ontario for dumping landfill from Toronto, instead of shipping to Michigan.

During a restructuring of CN's executives in mid-2003, Heller continued in his position as senior vice-president for the Eastern Canada Region, and reporting to the Canadian National CEO.

Upon being due to retire Heller owned a large number of shares in Canadian National which by 2005 were worth eight-times their original value.

=== Europe ===
In January 2004 Heller became the CEO of English, Welsh & Scottish Railway (EWS), Great Britain's largest rail freight operator, taking over from Philip Mengel. Heller previously had his own private train in Canada, and commissioned Interfleet Technology to develop the EWS Company Train for use in Great Britain. In April 2005 Heller invited Queen Elizabeth II to name one of the British Royal Train locomotives 67006 Royal Sovereign in a ceremony at Bristol Temple Meads railway station.

Heller was chairman of EWS and involved with its sale to Deutsche Bahn to become DB Schenker Rail (UK), and then DB Cargo UK. When Heller was CEO of EWS and the company was sold to Deutsche Bahn it had 4,900 employees and a turnover of 783 million euros.

In 2007 Robert Wright of the Financial Times described Heller as being a "well-regarded chief executive". In 2009 he was a member of the Rail Safety and Standards Board Sustainable Development Steering Group. Heller initiated a programme of withdrawing British Rail Class 60 locomotives, then overhauling the locomotives as "Super 60s".

Heller retired from Deutsche Bahn in January 2011 and was succeeded by Alain Thauvette also from Canada, who took over the Western Region covering the UK, France, Spain and Portugal. After retirement Heller continued as an adviser to DB Schenker. At the Rail Safety and Standards Board, in his appointment as a non-executive director he was replaced by Neil McDonald in early-2010, also from DB Schenker Rail UK. Heller had been based in the United Kingdom, something which did not occur with his successors until the appointment of Geoff Spencer as CEO of DB Schenker Rail UK in September 2013.

=== Other companies ===
As of April 2011 Heller was a non-executive director of the company behind the Rail-Pod robotic track geometry car system, and was involved with the Rail-Veyor mining transportation system.

As of 2012 Heller was a non-executive director of UK Coal, serving on the board of directors, on the audit committee, nomination committee and as chair of the health & Safety Committee. Heller's salary and fees for being a non-executive director of UK Coal were paid to the Canadian company S/Dolo, Inc. At the end of 2012 Heller transferred from the board of UK Coal Plc, to oversee the creation of the UK Coal Employee Benefit Trust responsible for 67% of the voting rights on behalf of former employees.

== Philanthropy ==
In 2009 Heller made a donation of over $100,000 to the University of Western Ontario.

In 2014 the Heller Family Foundation covered the cost of repainting the Canadian Railway Museum's locomotive number 1382 in traditional yellow and green livery.

In 2016 the Heller's foundation funded computers for 256 pupils and staff at schools within Carrillo, in the Guanacaste Province of Costa Rica in conjunction with educational programmes arranged by the Quirós Tanzi Foundation.

Heller is a vice-president of the UK-based Railway Benevolent Institution/Railway Benefit Fund. He became a vice-president in 2011 at the same time as Matthew Parris and Tom Harris.

== Recognition ==
Heller was invited by the Chartered Institute of Logistics and Transport to deliver their annual Sir Robert Reid lecture on 6 February 2008. He became only the second lecturer from a freight background. The lecture was entitled "Creating a Stronger European Rail Freight Network", and was chaired by Richard Brown with Chris Green leading the formal vote of thanks.

In April 2009 Heller appeared on the cover of Rail Professional magazine.

On 15 January 2010 diesel locomotive 67018 was named Keith Heller at the National Railway Museum in York, United Kingdom. This was the first British Rail Class 67 to be painted in DB Schenker livery.

In mid-2011 an N scale model of 67018 Keith Heller was released by Dapol. In January 2012 an OO gauge model of 67018 Keith Heller was released by Hornby Railways.
