= ECJS =

ECJS may refer to:

- Education civique, juridique et sociale, Citizen education in France
- East coast joint stock, British railway entity
