= British Royal Train =

Royal train for the use of the British royal family and staff

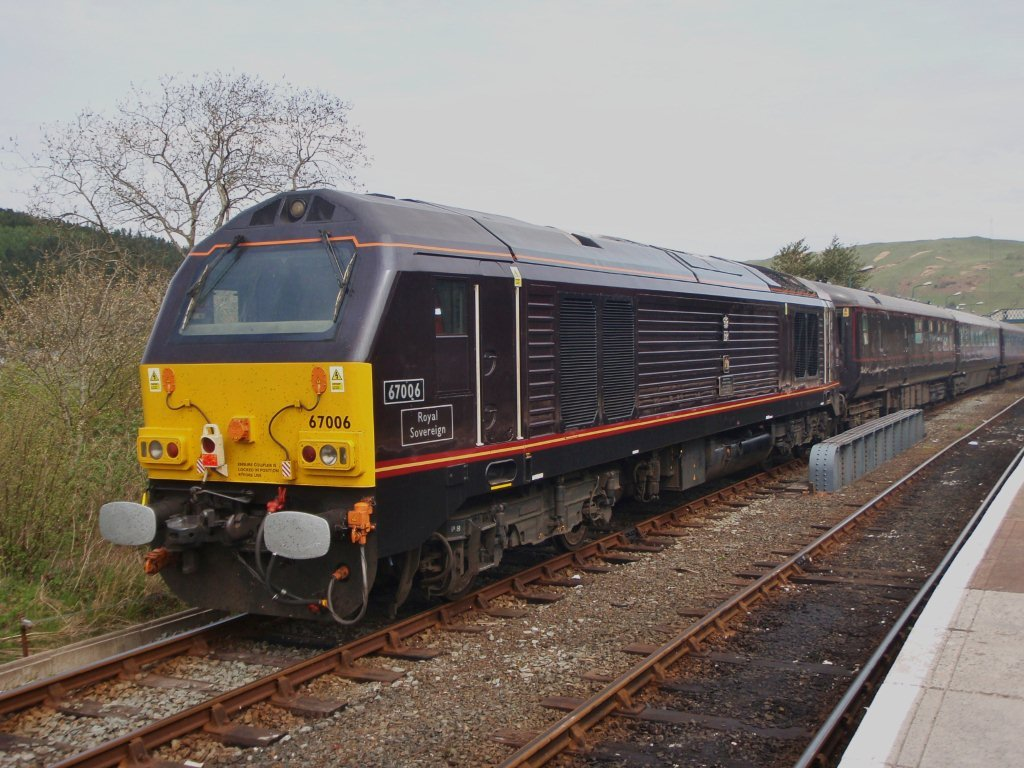
- Royal Train hauled by Class 67 67006 Royal Sovereign during a royal visit to Machynlleth in April 2010

Overview
- Service type: Royal train
- Current operator: DB Cargo UK

Technical
- Rolling stock: Class 67; Mark 3 carriages

The British Royal Train is used to convey senior members of the British royal family and associated staff of the Royal Household around the railway network of Great Britain. It is owned by Network Rail, and maintained and operated by DB Cargo UK.

The Royal Train comprises a dedicated set of claret-liveried sleeper, dining and lounge carriages. The current rolling stock dates from 1977 to 1987. They are arranged according to requirements, and stored when not in use. The earliest royal coaches date back to the mid-19th century in the reign of Queen Victoria; until an upgrade in 1977 there were multiple sets based in different regions, a legacy of the pre-nationalisation era of railways in Britain. Many are now in museums or on heritage railways; the National Railway Museum in York has a royal themed exhibition.

Dedicated locomotives have never traditionally been part of the Royal Train, first appearing in special livery only in the 1990s, but also seeing use on other trains since 2003. In the 21st century, various steam locomotives have also hauled the train on special occasions. Although regularly cited by critics as one of the unnecessary luxuries of the Royal Family, which has led to an increase where possible in the use of normal scheduled services as an alternative, supporters argue that the current arrangement emphasises utility over luxury, and is still often the most practical and secure mode of travel to fit the required itinerary and avoid disruption to the public.

In December 2020, the then Duke and Duchess of Cambridge travelled across Britain by the Royal Train to thank communities and key workers for their efforts during the COVID-19 pandemic. In November 2020, the American PBS network aired a two-part series, Secrets of Royal Travel, with the first episode featuring the train and its history.

== History ==
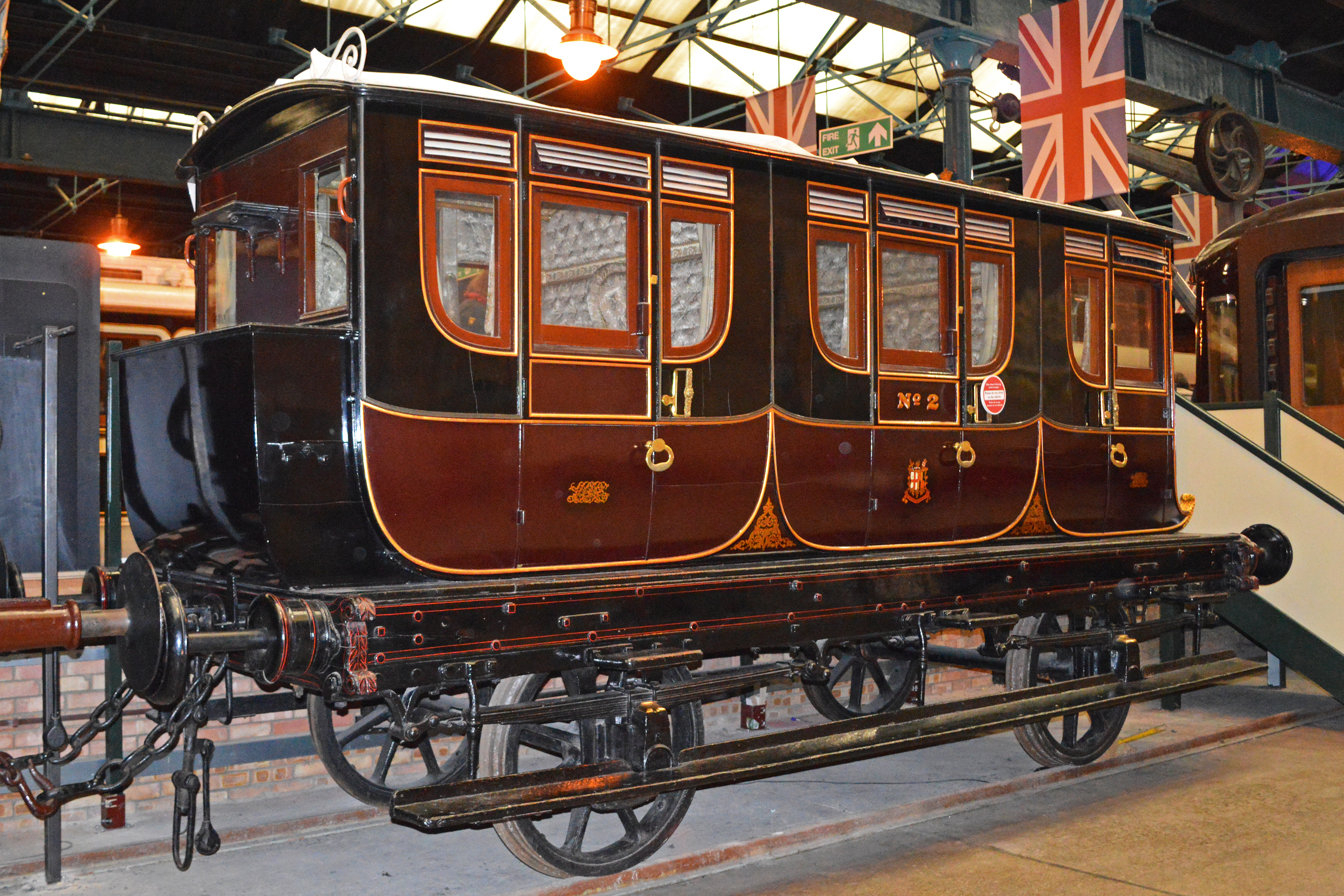
A special carriage built by the London and Birmingham Railway in 1842 for Queen Adelaide

The first member of the British royal family to travel by train was the Dowager Queen Adelaide, who took a train from Nottingham to Leeds on 22 July 1840. Queen Victoria was the first British monarch to travel by train, on 13 June 1842 on the Great Western Railway (GWR), which ran the line between London Paddington and Windsor for Windsor Castle. The train transported the queen from Slough to London Paddington, and was hauled by the locomotive Phlegethon, driven by Daniel Gooch assisted by Isambard Kingdom Brunel. The Queen used a royal saloon which had been constructed by the GWR in 1840. According to the historian Kate Williams, the Queen "saw travelling the country as her duty, whereas monarchs didn't necessarily think that before".

The first carriage built for the exclusive use of a member of the British Royal Family was constructed in 1842 by the London and Birmingham Railway for Queen Adelaide. This carriage is now on display in the National Railway Museum in York.

In 1869, Queen Victoria commissioned a pair of coaches for £1,800 (equivalent to £185,000 in 2025) from the London and North Western Railway.

In 1874, the GWR built a new royal saloon at its Swindon Works for the use of the queen. It was constructed under the supervision of Joseph Armstrong. It was 43 feet (13 m) long.

In 1877, the London and South Western Railway built a royal saloon for the use of the queen. It was built at the company workshop at Nine Elms and was 50 feet (15 m) long.

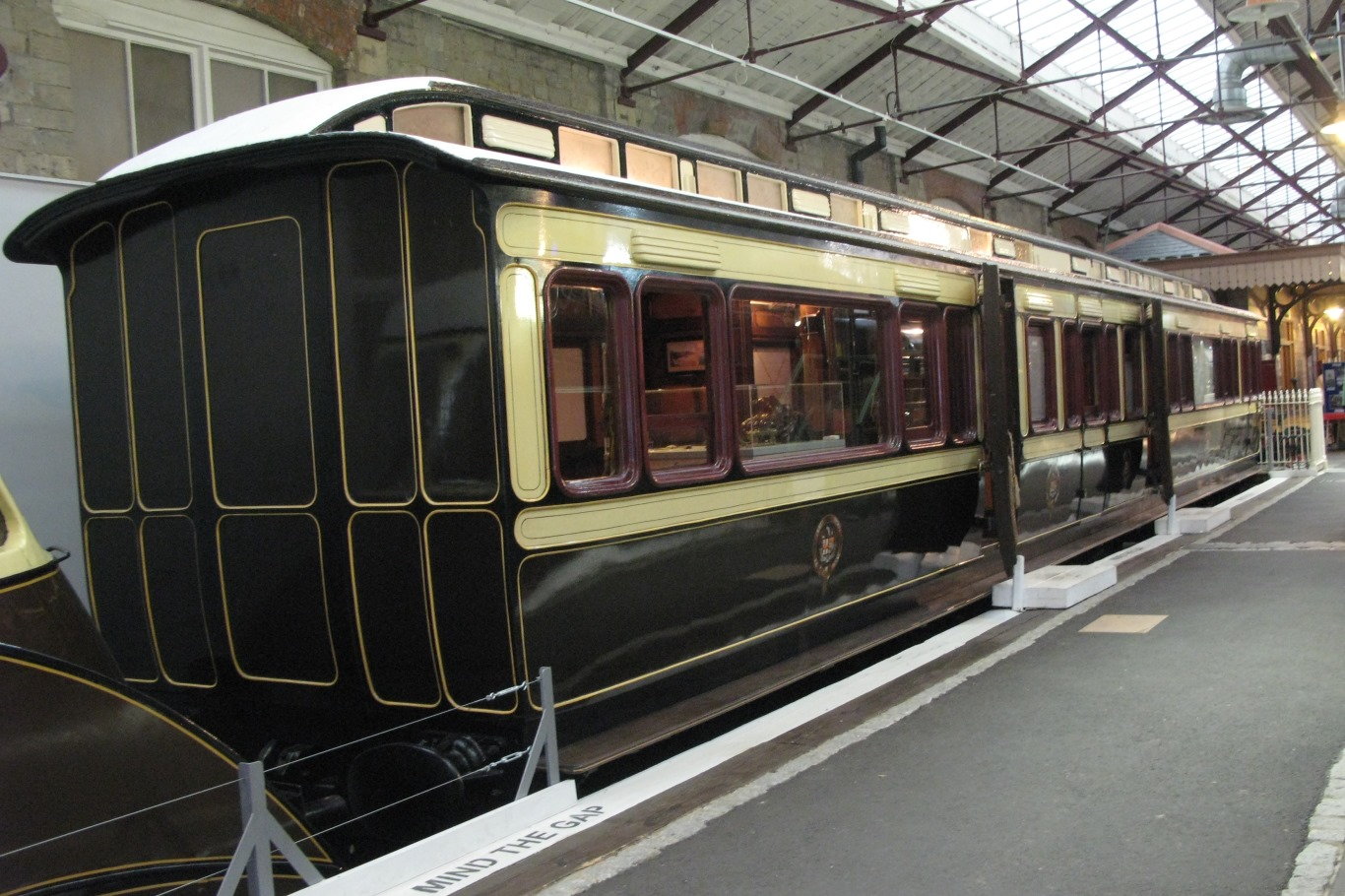
Queen Victoria's GWR saloon of 1897 in Swindon

In 1897, the GWR marked the Diamond Jubilee of Queen Victoria by providing a new royal train of six coaches. Until then, railway companies had provided special saloon carriages, but there was no regular royal train until this one was constructed. It replaced the GWR royal carriage of 1874, which was re-fitted and lengthened to 53.5 feet (16.3 m).

By the 1890s, the Queen's train was equipped with electric lighting and a toilet, although she insisted on stopping at stations to use the facilities.

In 1899, the London, Brighton and South Coast Railway provided a new royal train of five carriages, each 52 feet (16 m) long, comprising the royal saloon in the centre and saloon carriages at either end. The Morning Post of 17 April 1899 reported:

The Royal Saloon is divided into two sections, the larger portion being especially fitted for the Princess of Wales, and the smaller portion for the Prince of Wales. In the matters of the decorations and furniture of the saloons the Company consulted their Royal Highnesses, whose choice rested on quiet, and at the same time artistic, ornamentation. The chief woods employed are kauri pine, Cuba mahogany, and satinwood. The inlaid panels and Lincrusta-Walton dados, in which the rose, shamrock, and thistle are designed, show great taste of skilled workmanship, and the same remark may be applied to the furniture in the saloon, which consists of sofas and easy-chairs upholstered in dark green morocco, that being the colour and material which her Royal Highness preferred to any other.

Nearly sixty years after her first train journey, after her funeral in 1901, Queen Victoria's coffin was taken to London Paddington and transported on the royal train back to Windsor, where she is buried.

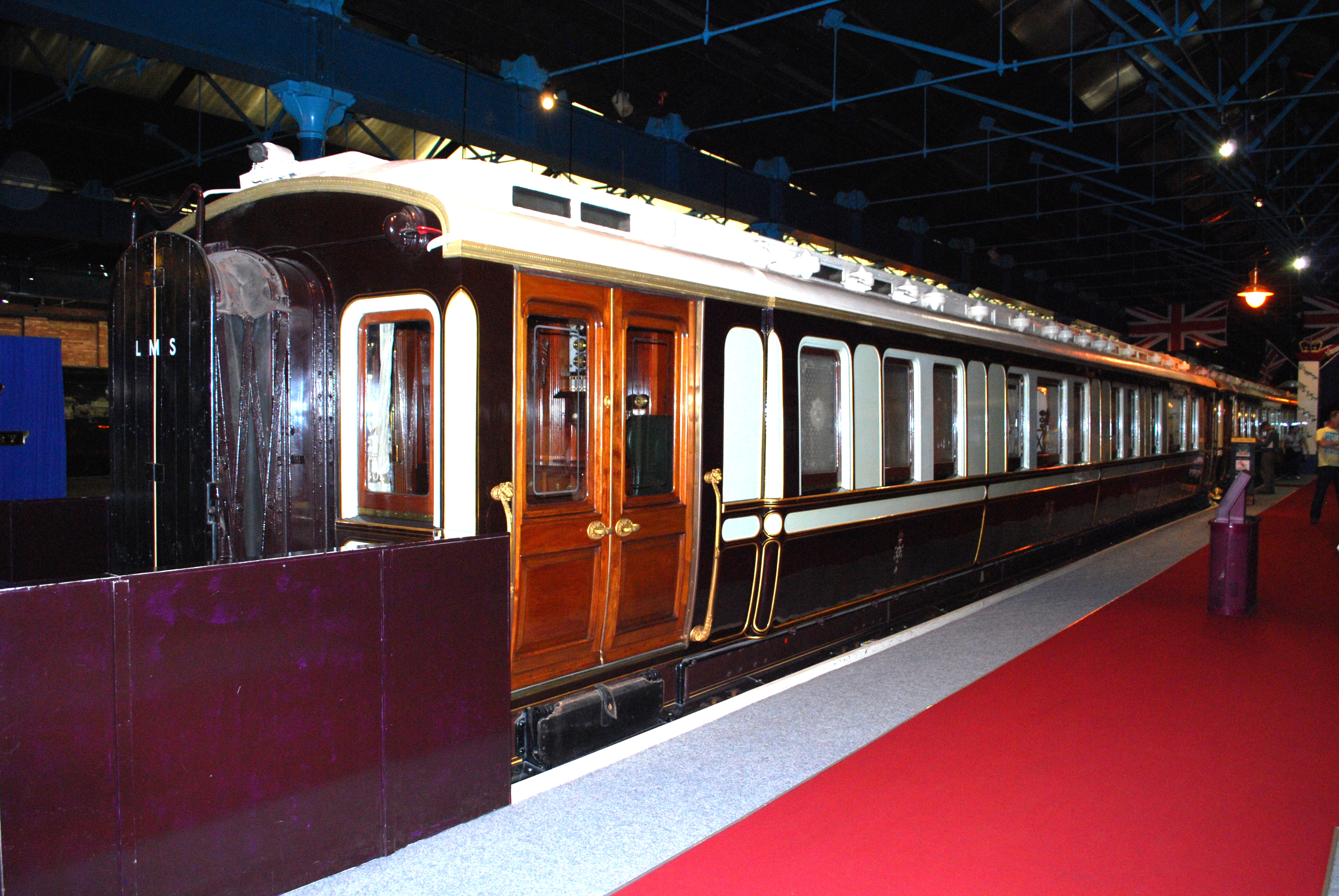
King Edward's saloon of 1902 at the National Railway Museum York

In 1902, her son Edward VII commissioned new royal saloons from the London and North Western Railway. They were built in the Wolverton Works under the direction of C. A. Park. Two saloons were provided, one for the king and one for the queen. The interior decoration was carried out by S.J. Waring and Sons. The king's saloon had a smoking room in mahogany, with inlays of rosewood and satinwood, and a day compartment in the Colonial style, in white enamel. The saloons included electric heating. These saloons are now preserved at the National Railway Museum in York.

In 1908, the Great Northern Railway and North Eastern Railway jointly provided two new saloons and a brake van for use over their lines. Edward VII used this for the first time on 7 September 1908 for a journey to Ollerton railway station when visiting Rufford Abbey to stay with Lord and Lady Savile for the Doncaster Races.

In 1912, the Midland Railway provided a royal saloon for George V. It was built at the company workshops in Derby under the supervision of D. Bain, the works superintendent, and fitted out by Waring & Gillow. It was numbered 1910 to mark the year of the king's accession and first used in July 1912 when the king and queen travelled from Yorkshire to London. The Midland Railway Company also provided a dining car which could be attached to the saloon when required.

Prior to the partition of Ireland in 1921, royal trains were occasionally used for the British Royal Family when Ireland was under British rule. In 1897, the Great Northern Railway provided a new royal train of six vehicles comprising a drawing-room saloon, a dining saloon, first-class carriage, composite coach, and two vans. This was constructed in their own workshops and used for the first time during a visit by the Duke and Duchess of York in September 1897 and a trip from Banagher to Clara over the tracks of the Great Southern and Western Railway. This use of a royal train continued in Northern Ireland until the last British royal train there in the 1950s.

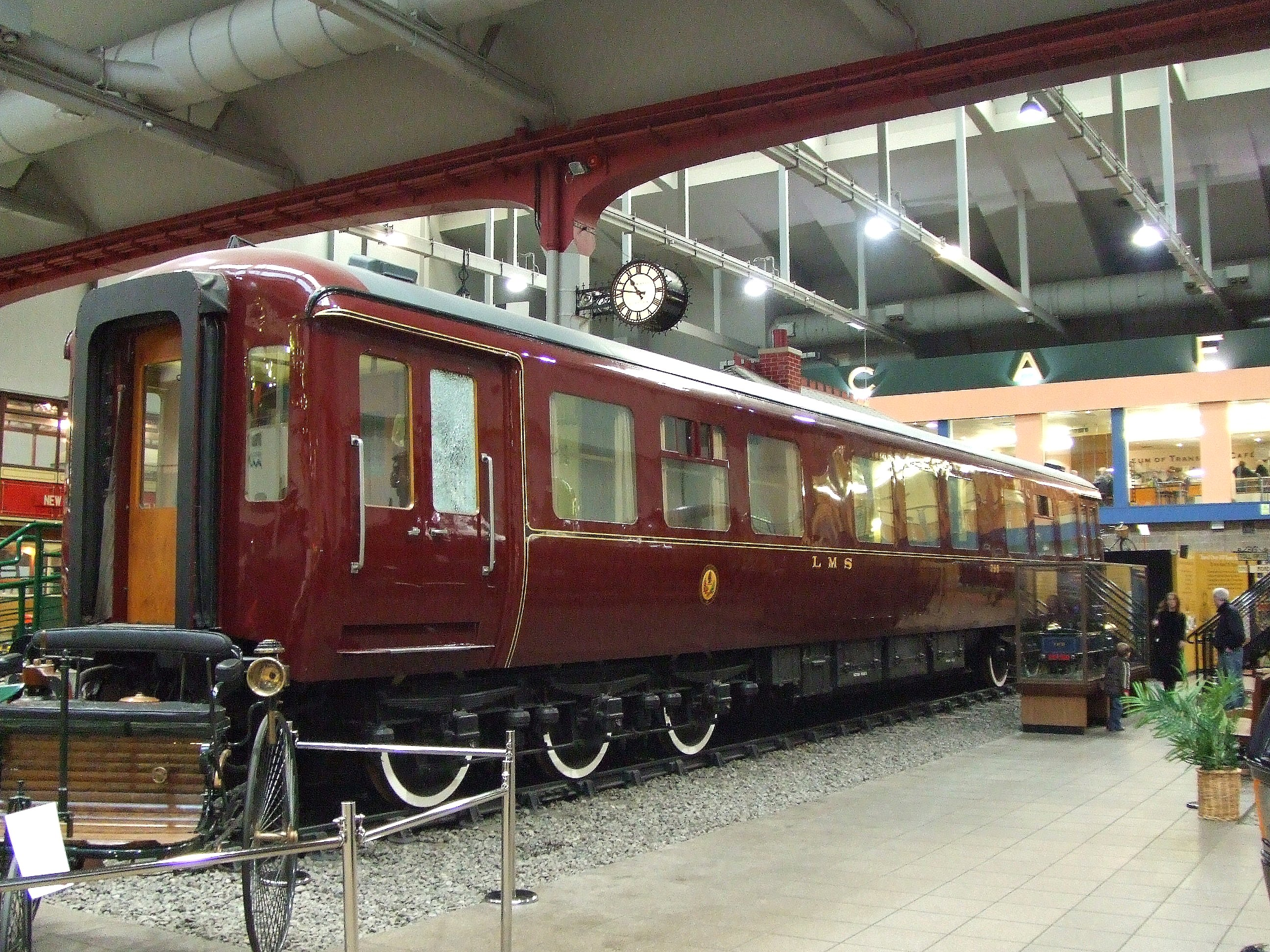
George VI's armoured saloon of 1941, built by the London, Midland and Scottish Railway (LMS) (now with armour plating removed), in the Glasgow Transport Museum

The Great Western Railway abandoned its old royal saloons of 1897 during the 1930s and borrowed stock from the LMS when required. In 1941, the LMS built three armour-plated saloons with safe cabinets for documents, for George VI, who travelled to parts of England that were under bombing raids during World War II. During that period, the existence of the Royal Train was still a state secret.

Shortly after the war, the armour plating was removed. New saloons were provided by the royal family for their train. Two of these cars have survived into preservation.

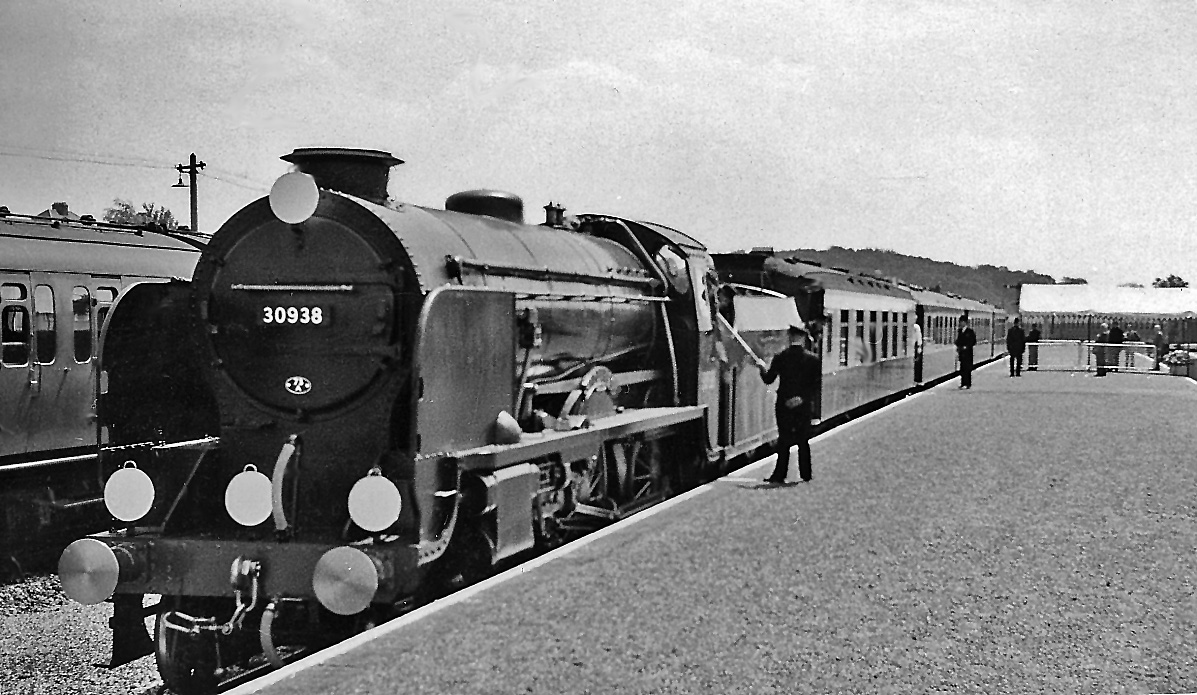
Royal Train arriving at Tattenham Corner on Derby Day in 1959. Notice the station master marking the stopping point for the driver.

After the formation of British Railways in 1948, the individual regions continued to maintain the constituent railway companies' royal train carriages. A single "Royal Train" was formed in 1977 as a response to the demands of the Silver Jubilee of Elizabeth II, with the carriages painted "a rich burgundy colour known as Royal Claret". The interiors have since been upgraded; some of the features ensure greater safety for their occupants. The royal family have also travelled on ordinary service trains more frequently in recent years to minimise costs.

The train currently consists of nine carriages, seven of these being of the British Rail Mark 3 design, including two that were built for the prototype HST train. Not all of these are used to form a train, as different vehicles have specified purposes. A 2020 report stated that they included a lounge for the Queen and another for Prince Philip, as well as carriages that serve as bedrooms, bathrooms, a dining car and a couchette. The Queen's private carriage included a "bathroom complete with a full-sized bathtub". Carriages are also available for staff, including sleeping quarters.

Two locomotives are designated for use on the train, and a third is available. All are painted in the claret livery of the royal household, but are used for other traffic when not hauling the royal train. A 2020 report stated that the Class 67 locomotives use "bio-fuel made from waste vegetable oil".

The carriages may be used for other heads of state, but they cannot be hired by private users. The train was used to convey officials to the 24th G8 summit in May 1998. When not in use, the train is stored in Wolverton Works, where it is maintained by DB Cargo UK. From the 1960s to the 1990s, the train was stored in the dedicated Royal Train Shed at Wolverton.

As part of the privatisation of British Rail, ownership passed to Railtrack. It is currently owned by Network Rail.

Train drivers are specially selected based on their skills, including the ability to make a station stop within six inches of the designated position.

In June 2025, it was announced that the Royal Train is to be retired.

== Incidents ==
On 10 October 1881, the train carrying the Prince and Princess of Wales and Princess Louise from Ballater to Aberdeen lost a tyre from one of the tender wheels.

In November 1883, at the time of the Fenian dynamite outrages in England, the government received anonymous information that an attempt would be made against Queen Victoria's forthcoming journey from Windsor to Ballater. The report could not be corroborated, and could have been a mischievous hoax, but the Home Secretary, William Harcourt, asked George Findlay, general manager of the LNWR, to arrange special protection. Jointly with the other companies along the route, platelayers and other workers were mobilised to inspect every bridge along the 600-mile (970 km) journey and to watch over the line, each watcher in sight of the next, until the train had passed.

On 21 June 1898, David Fenwick, engine driver, was killed whilst driving the Royal Train between Aberdeen and Perth. The inquest found that he had climbed onto the coal tender to attempt to resolve a problem with the communication cord, and was killed after an impact with a bridge.

The Royal Train has had a very good service record. However, Gerald Fiennes wrote in his autobiography I Tried to Run a Railway of one incident on the Eastern Region when an ex-LNER A4 class 4-6-2 was used to pull the Royal Train. The first vehicle was a BR Midland Region generator van, and the difference between the 'buckeye' couplings on the A4 and on the van was about two inches. Various attempts to separate the couplings failed, leading the crew to couple up the station pilot (standing at the rear of the train) and apply the brakes. The A4's regulator was then opened to full cut-off, resulting in the engine breaking free from the generator van. The standard screw coupling was then used instead of the 'buckeye' couplings on the two vehicles.

In June 2000, a member of the Royalty Protection Branch (SO14) accidentally discharged his 9mm Glock automatic pistol while the train was halted for an overnight stop in South Wales. Both the Queen and Prince Philip were on board at the time, but were undisturbed by the accidental discharge, only becoming aware of it the following morning when notified by staff.

== Locomotives nominated for the Royal Train ==
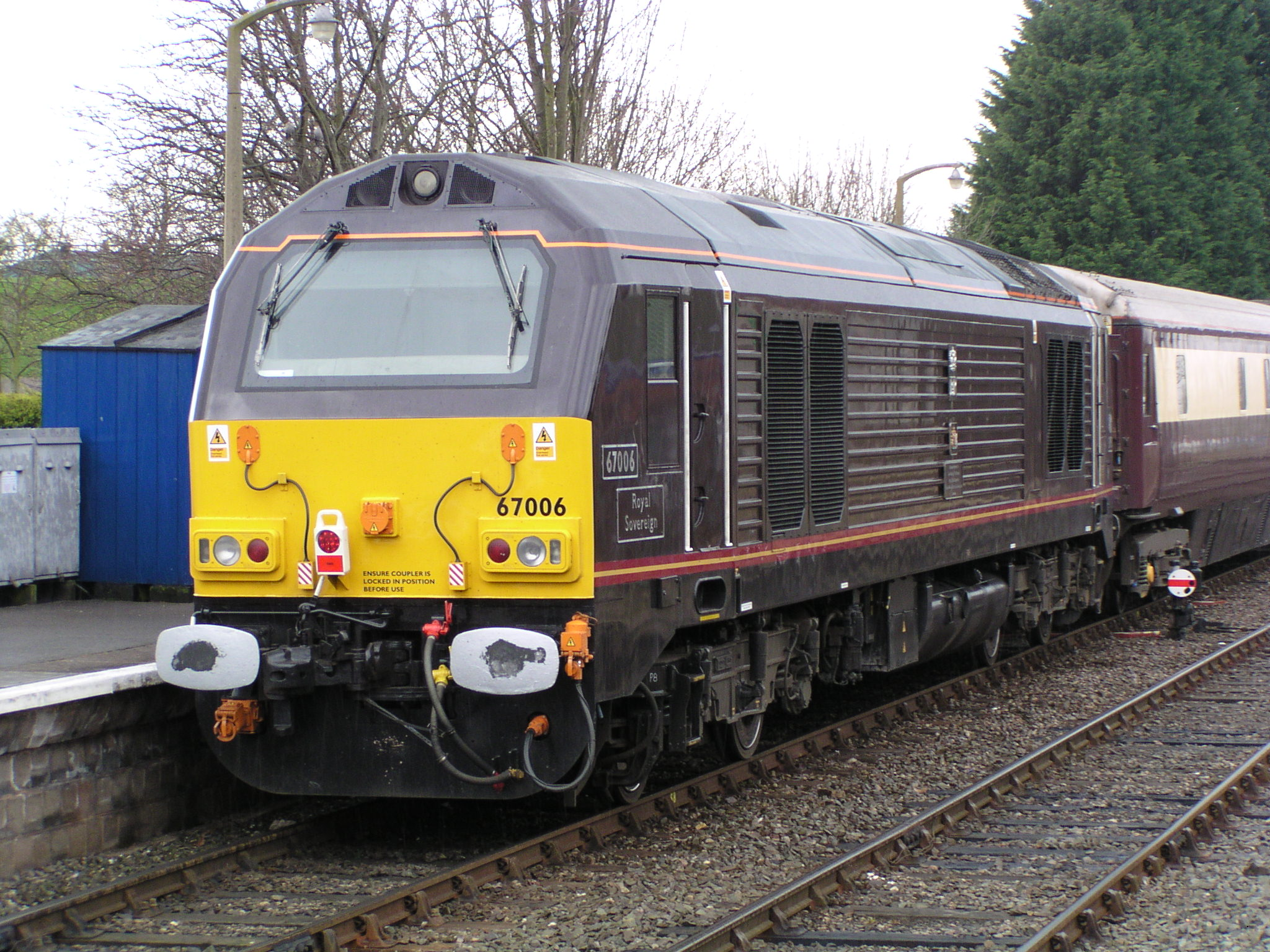
Class 67, no. 67006 "Royal Sovereign" at Evesham on 26 March 2005, hauling the Northern Belle. This is one of the two locomotives painted in Royal Claret livery for hauling the Royal Train.

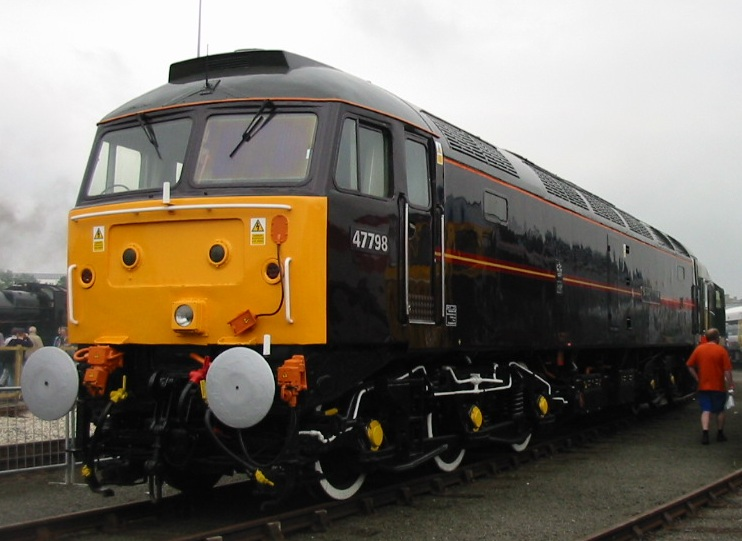
Former Royal locomotive 47798 Prince William at the Rail200 railfest at the National Railway Museum 1 June 2004.

Although railways often had nominated locomotives for hauling the Royal Train (with special high maintenance regimes), no locomotives were dedicated solely to the train until the 1990s, when two Class 47 locomotives were painted in the claret livery of the Royal Household. They were replaced in 2003 by two Class 67 locomotives, both operated by EWS (now DB Cargo UK). The new locomotives are often used for special charter train services and on other occasional passenger services when not required. Occasionally the Royal Train is hauled by other engines.

Locomotives nominated for working the Royal Train have included:

- 1990–2004: Class 47 47834 Fire Fly and 47835 Windsor Castle (in InterCity livery) and later refurbished, renumbered and renamed 47798 Prince William and 47799 Prince Henry (in Royal claret). Both are now withdrawn and have entered preservation: Prince William is preserved at the National Railway Museum, York, while Prince Henry is at the Eden Valley Railway, Warcop.
- Since 2004: Class 67 67005 Queen's Messenger and 67006 Royal Sovereign (in Royal claret). Since 2012 an extra locomotive, Class 67 67026 Diamond Jubilee (in Diamond Jubilee silver), has been allocated to Royal duties.

=== Steam locomotives ===
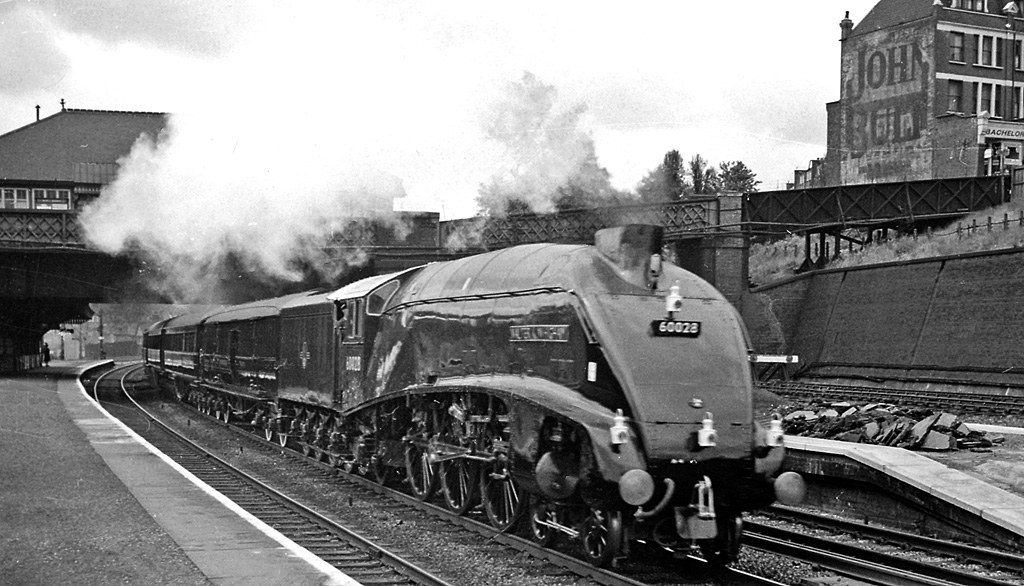
The Royal Train passing Harringay West in 1961, the locomotive, Gresley A4 Pacific No. 60028 'Walter K. Whigham' carries a four-lamp headcode that was reserved for the Royal Train

In the pre-preservation era, the Royal Train was always hauled by steam locomotives for the relevant British Rail region. Examples of royal trains hauled by preserved steam are as follows. In preservation examples include the visit of Prince Edward, Duke of Kent to the Keighley & Worth Valley Railway on 10 July 2008: 6233 Duchess of Sutherland (an LMS Princess Coronation Class 4-6-2), 6024 King Edward I (a GWR 'King' Class 4-6-0), and 60163 Tornado (a new LNER-design Peppercorn A1 4-6-2).

On 11 June 2002, the restored 6233 Duchess of Sutherland was the first steam locomotive to haul the Royal Train for 35 years, transporting Queen Elizabeth II on a tour to North Wales, from Holyhead to Llandudno Junction, as part of her Golden Jubilee. The trip also marked the 160th anniversary of the first Royal train in 1842.

On 22 March 2005, Duchess of Sutherland again hauled the Royal Train, the second time for a steam locomotive in 40 years, transporting the Prince of Wales from Settle to Carlisle over the Settle-Carlisle line. The trip marked the 25th anniversary of the formation of the "Friends of the Settle and Carlisle" pressure group. On the trip, the Prince spent 15 minutes behind the controls of the locomotive.

On 10 June 2008, 6024 King Edward I hauled the Royal Train, transporting the Prince of Wales and the Duchess of Cornwall on board, from Kidderminster Town to Bridgnorth, on a visit to the Severn Valley Railway. Once again, the Prince of Wales took the controls of the locomotive for a period.

On 19 February 2009, the Royal Train was hauled by the first standard-gauge steam locomotive to be built in Britain in over 40 years, 60163 Tornado, an LNER-design Peppercorn Class A1 4-6-2, with the Prince of Wales and the Duchess of Cornwall on board, the Prince travelling in the cab.

On 4 February 2010, Tornado again hauled the Royal Train, taking the Prince of Wales and the Duchess of Cornwall to the Museum of Science and Industry in Manchester.

On 24 January 2012, BR 70000 Britannia hauled the royal train, taking the Prince of Wales from Preston to Wakefield for a renaming ceremony to commemorate 70000's recent return to traffic after an overhaul.

On 11 July 2012, the Queen visited Worcester and the train was hauled by namesake locomotive 6201 Princess Elizabeth. This was also one of the locomotives considered for use during the Queen's tour of North Wales in 2002, although 6233 Duchess of Sutherland was eventually chosen for the trip from Newport to Hereford, and then from Worcester to Oxford.

On 23 July 2012, Tornado again hauled the Royal Train, taking the Prince of Wales from Kemble to Alnmouth.

On 7 December 2018, 35028 Clan Line hauled the train, taking the Prince of Wales to Cardiff.

On 12 June 2023, King Charles III travelled behind LNER Class A3, 4472 Flying Scotsman in the Royal Carriages along the North Yorkshire Moors Railways heritage line to Pickering, in part to mark the 50th anniversary of the official opening of the railway. In keeping with tradition, the cab of the Flying Scotsman had the roof painted white, and new lamps fitted.

== Royal Train carriages ==
=== Historic carriages ===
The table below lists historic Royal Train carriages, from Britain and Ireland, in chronological order to 1977. Where a separate date is shown for building, the vehicle was converted rather than built new.

| Key: | In service | Withdrawn | Preserved | Returned to normal traffic | Departmental use | Scrapped |

| Number(s) | Introduced | Original owner | Withdrawn | Status | Notes on use | Current location |
|---|---|---|---|---|---|---|
| | 1840 | Great Western Railway | unknown | Scrapped | Saloon. Not used by Queen Victoria until 1842. | Scrapped |
| 2 | 1842 | London and Birmingham Railway | 1850 | Preserved | Queen Adelaide's saloon | National Railway Museum, York |
| | ca. 1843 | London and South Western Railway | unknown | Scrapped | Saloon. Later went to the K&ESR, later sold to SR, withdrawn and body grounded. Later broken up in 1964 due to being "a little bit rotten". | Scrapped |
| | 1848 | Great Western Railway | unknown | Scrapped | Saloon. Converted to Standard Gauge in 1889 | Scrapped in 1903 |
| 17 | 1850s | London, Brighton and South Coast Railway | unknown | Scrapped | Saloon | Scrapped |
| | 1851 | London and South Western Railway | 1876 (To passenger stock) | Scrapped | Saloon | |
| | 1866 | London, Chatham and Dover Railway | unknown | Scrapped | Saloon. | Scrapped |
| (LMS 802) | 1869 | London and North Western Railway | 1902 | Preserved | Queen Victoria's saloon. Originally two vehicles until combined on one underframe in 1895. | National Railway Museum, York |
| 229 / 9001 | 1874 | Great Western Railway | 1912 | Preserved | Queen Victoria's saloon | Small section at National Railway Museum, York |
| 10 | 1877 | London and South Western Railway | 1925 | Preserved | Prince of Wales' Saloon | Stoborough |
| 8 | 1881 (Built 1877) | Great Eastern Railway | 1897 (To passenger stock) | Preserved | Prince of Wales' Saloon | Embsay |
| 17 | 1887 (Built 1885) | London and South Western Railway | 1913 (To passenger stock) | Preserved | Saloon | Bolton Abbey |
| 153 | 1897 | Belfast and County Down Railway | 1924 (To passenger stock) | Preserved | Irish Saloon | Downpatrick and County Down Railway |
| 233 / 9002 | 1897 | Great Western Railway | 1930 | Preserved | Diamond Jubilee train saloon | Museum of the Great Western Railway, Swindon |
| 234 / 9003 | 1897 | Great Western Railway | 1930 | Preserved | Diamond Jubilee train saloon | St Germans station |
| 5 | 1898 | Great Eastern Railway | 1925 (To departmental stock) | Preserved | Princess of Wales' Saloon | Furness Railway Trust |
| 85 | 1899 | London, Brighton and South Coast Railway | unknown | Scrapped | Saloon | Scrapped |
| 86 | 1899 | London, Brighton and South Coast Railway | unknown | Scrapped | Saloon | Scrapped |
| 87 | 1899 | London, Brighton and South Coast Railway | unknown | Scrapped | 1st and brake | Scrapped |
| 1 | 1901 (Built 1898) | Great North of Scotland Railway | 1910 (To passenger stock) | Preserved | Saloon | Bo'ness and Kinneil Railway |
| (LMS 800) | 1902 | London and North Western Railway | 1947 | Preserved | Edward VII's saloon | National Railway Museum, York |
| (LMS 801) | 1902 | London and North Western Railway | 1947 | Preserved | Queen Alexandra's saloon | National Railway Museum, York |
| 351 | 1903 | Great Southern and Western Railway | 1974 (as Irish State Coach) | Preserved | Irish Saloon | Iarnród Éireann Inchicore Works |
| (CIÉ 346) | 1903 | Midland Great Western Railway | Last used in 1932 | Scrapped | Irish Saloon | Scrapped 1960s |
| 72 / 5072 / 10504 / 804 | 1903 | London and North Western Railway | 1948 | Scrapped | Semi-Royal saloon, used by Winston Churchill during World War II | Scrapped 1998 |
| 74 / 5074 / 10506 / 806 | 1903 | London and North Western Railway | 1971 | Preserved | Semi-Royal saloon | Bluebell Railway |
| 1R / 7930 | 1903 | South Eastern and Chatham Railway | unknown | Scrapped | Saloon. Built by the Metropolitan - Amalgamated Railway Carriage & Wagon Company for £3,670. | Withdrawn September 1947 |
| 82 / 109 | 1908 | East Coast Joint Stock | 1977 | Preserved | Royal Train brake van | National Railway Museum, York |
| 395 | 1908 | East Coast Joint Stock | 1977 | Preserved | Edward VII's saloon | National Railway Museum, York |
| 396 | 1908 | East Coast Joint Stock | 1977 | Preserved | Queen Alexandra's saloon | Preserved, Bressingham Steam Museum |
| 1910 / 809 | 1912 | Midland Railway | 1951 (To passenger stock) | Preserved | George V's saloon. In passenger stock 1923–33, numbered 2795 | Midland Railway - Butterley |
| 10070 / 5154 | 1924 (Built 1905) | London, Midland and Scottish Railway | 1977 | Preserved | Staff car with generators in brake van | National Railway Museum, Shildon |
| 10071 / 5155 | 1924 (Built 1905) | London, Midland and Scottish Railway | 1977 | Preserved | Staff couchette | National Railway Museum, Shildon |
| 798 | 1941 | London, Midland and Scottish Railway | 1977 | Preserved | George VI's armoured saloon | Severn Valley Railway |
| 799 | 1941 | London, Midland and Scottish Railway | 1977 | Preserved | Queen Elizabeth's (later Queen Elizabeth the Queen Mother) armoured saloon | National Railway Museum, York |
| 31209 / 2910 | 1941 | London, Midland and Scottish Railway | 1989 | Scrapped | Staff sleeper with generator, retained for post-1977 train | Scrapped 1991 |
| 9006 | 1945 | Great Western Railway | 1984 | Preserved | Queen Elizabeth's (later Queen Elizabeth the Queen Mother) Saloon | Midland Railway - Butterley |
| 9007 | 1945 | Great Western Railway | 1984 | Preserved | Queen Elizabeth's (later Queen Elizabeth the Queen Mother) Saloon | National Railway Museum, York |
| 45000 / 2911 | 1948 (Built 1920) | British Railways | 1990 | Preserved | Saloon, retained for post-1977 train | Midland Railway - Butterley |
| 45005 | 1948 (Built 1942) | British Railways | 1977 | Preserved | Saloon | Fawley Hill |
| 45006 / 2912 | 1948 (Built 1942) | British Railways | 1989 | Scrapped | Saloon, retained for post-1977 train | Scrapped 1991 |
| 2900 | 1955 | British Railways | 1994 | Preserved | Royal Family lounge, bedrooms and bathroom, retained for post-1977 train | Preserved, Fawley Hill Railway |
| 499 / 2902 | 1956 | British Railways | 1994 | Preserved | Royal Family dining car with kitchen, retained for post-1977 train | Preserved, Midland Railway - Butterley |
| 2901 | 1957 | British Railways | 1994 | Preserved | Royal Household office, bedrooms and bathrooms, retained for post-1977 train | Preserved, Bressingham Steam Museum |
| 2013 / 2908 | ? (Built 1958) | British Railways | 1984 | Scrapped | Staff sleeper, retained for post-1977 train | Scrapped 2012 |
| 325 / 2907 | ? (Built 1961) | British Railways | 1993 (To passenger stock) | Return to normal traffic | Staff dining car with kitchen, retained for post-1977 train | In passenger stock as number 325 |

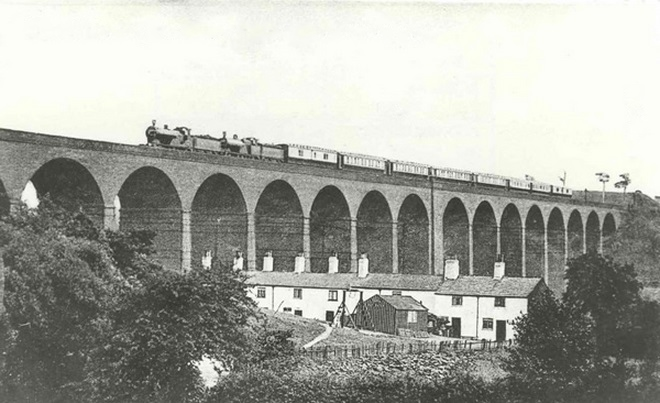
The LNWR Royal Train travels over the Reddish Vale Viaduct in 1905.

=== Fleet from 1977 ===
In 1977, the Royal Train was considerably changed to update it for use during Elizabeth II's Silver Jubilee celebrations. A number of new carriages were added to the train, and old ones either refurbished or withdrawn. Since this time all Royal Train vehicles have been painted Royal Claret and numbered in a dedicated series commencing at 2900.

The new 1977 vehicles were converted Mark 3 carriages originally built for the prototype High Speed Train (HST) in the early 1970s. The new formation has a higher maximum speed, depending on the locomotive, an important factor if slots are to be found for the train on crowded main lines.

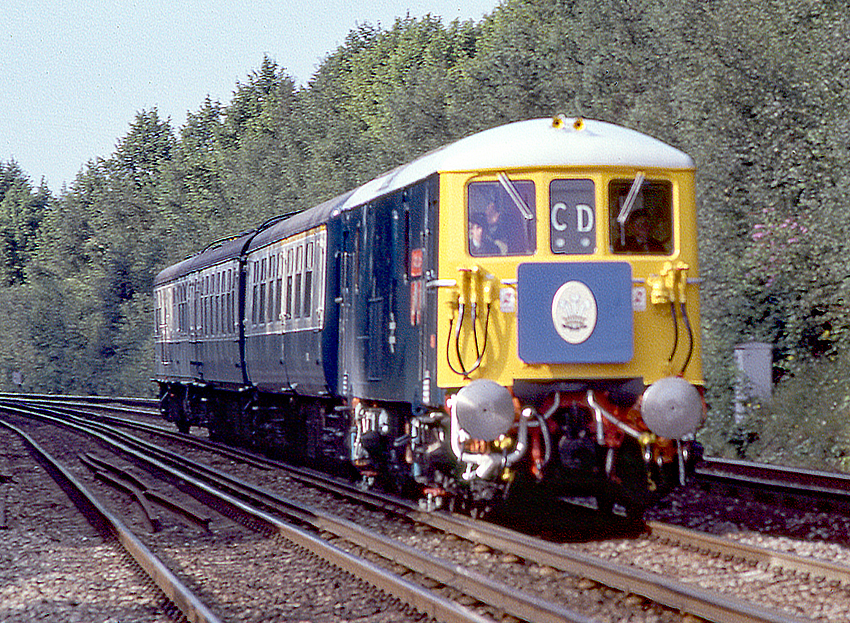
Charles & Diana's honeymoon special passing Shawford.

Following the wedding of Prince Charles and Lady Diana Spencer on 29 July 1981, the honeymoon royal train configuration was formed with inspection saloon 975025 Caroline.

The table below lists all the vehicles used in the fleet since 1977 in numerical order.

| Key: | In service | Withdrawn | Preserved | Returned to normal traffic | Departmental use | Scrapped |

| Number | Previous numbers | Converted | Status | Intended use | Current location |
|---|---|---|---|---|---|
| 2900 | - | New (1955) | Preserved | Royal Family lounge, bedrooms and bathroom | Preserved, Fawley Hill Railway |
| 2901 | - | New (1957) | Preserved | Royal Household office, bedrooms and bathrooms | Preserved, Bressingham Steam Museum |
| 2902 | 499 | New (1956) | Preserved | Royal Family dining car with kitchen; renumbered 1977 | Preserved, Midland Railway - Butterley |
| 2903 | 11001 | 1977 | In Service | The King’s lounge, bedroom and bathroom | In service |
| 2904 | 12001 | 1977 | In Service | The Queen's lounge, bedroom and bathroom | In service |
| 2905 | 14105 | 1977 | Returned to Normal Traffic | Royal Household couchette, diesel generator & brake van | Sold to Riviera Trains 2001, renumbered 17105 |
| 2906 | 14112 | 1977 | Departmental Use | Royal Household couchette | To departmental service 2001 with Network Rail, renumbered 977969 |
| 2907 | 325 | 1977 | Returned to Normal Traffic | Royal Household dining car with kitchen | Returned to ordinary passenger stock, 325 |
| 2908 | 2013 | 1977 | Scrapped | Royal Household sleeper | Scrapped 2012 |
| 2909 | 2500 | 1981 | Withdrawn | Royal Household sleeper | Withdrawn, West Coast Railways, Carnforth |
| 2910 | M31209M | New (1941) | Scrapped | Royal Household sleeper, generator & brake van; renumbered 1983 | Scrapped (1991) |
| 2911 | LNWR 5000, M45000M | New (1920) | Preserved | Special saloon; renumbered 1983 | Preserved, Midland Railway - Butterley |
| 2912 | M45006M | New (1942) | Scrapped | Special saloon; renumbered 1983 | Scrapped (1991) |
| 2914 | 10734 | 1985 | Returned to Normal Traffic | Royal Household sleeping car | Sold to Cotswold Rail 2001, renumbered 10734, later became part of the Northern Belle |
| 2915 | 10735 | 1985 | In Service | Royal Household sleeping car | In service |
| 2916 | 40512 | 1986 | In Service | Royal Family dining car with kitchen | In service |
| 2917 | 40514 | 1986 | In Service | Royal Household dining car with kitchen | In service |
| 2918 | 40515 | 1986 | Withdrawn | Royal Household car | Stored |
| 2919 | 40518 | 1986 | Withdrawn | Royal Household car | Stored |
| 2920 | 14109, 17109 | 1986 | In Service | Royal Household couchette, diesel generator & brake van | In service |
| 2921 | 14107, 17107 | 1986 | In Service | Royal Household couchette, kitchen & brake van | In service |
| 2922 | – | New (1987) | In Service | The Prince of Wales's sleeping car | In service |
| 2923 | – | New (1987) | In Service | The Prince of Wales's saloon | In service |

== Royal Train use ==
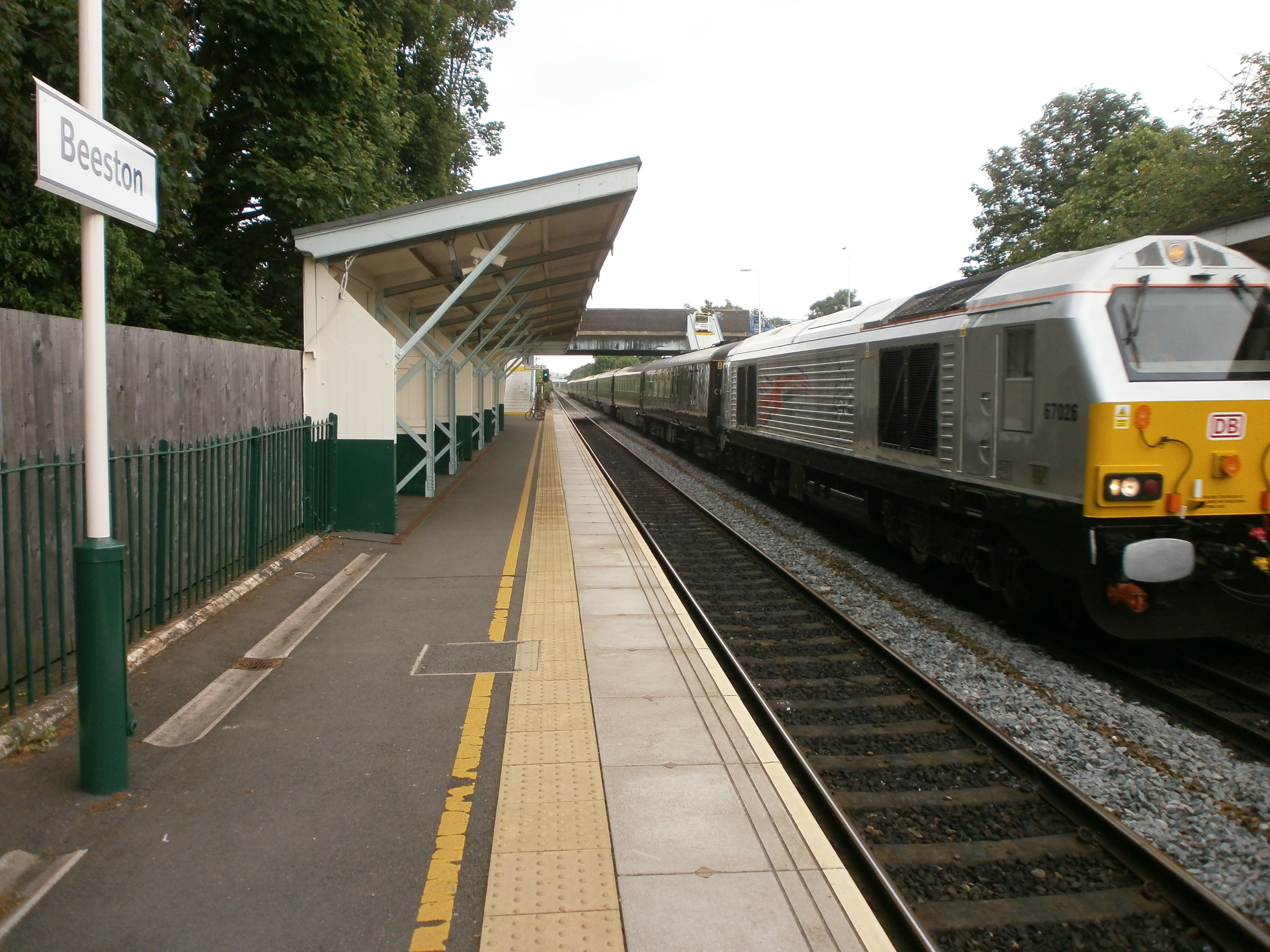
Typical 8-carriage royal train configuration of 2921, 2903, 2916, 2922, 2923, 2917, 2915, 2920 between top and tail royal Class 67s during 2012.

Royal Train Use
| year | end | trips | miles/trip | Cost/year |
|---|---|---|---|---|
| 2012 | 31 March 2012 | 13 | 912 | £900,000 |
| 2011 | 31 March 2011 | 14 | 931 | £900,000 |
| 2010 | 31 March 2010 | 19 | 751 | £1,000,000 |
| 2009 | 31 March 2009 | 14 | 696 | £800,000 |
| 2008 | 31 March 2008 | 19 | 755 | £900,000 |
| 2007 | 31 March 2007 | 11 | 655 | £700,000 |
| 2006 | 31 March 2006 | 14 | 700 | £600,000 |
| 2005 | 31 March 2005 | 19 | 691 | £700,000 |
| 2004 | 31 March 2004 | 18 | 736 | £800,000 |

Although this type of travel is expensive compared to scheduled services, the train enables members of the Royal Family to carry out busy schedules over an extended period, in a secure environment that minimises disruption and inconvenience to the public and provides accommodation and office facilities. On at least one occasion, Charles III has conducted a dinner meeting on board the train.

Some members of Parliament have argued that the Royal Train, like the Royal Yacht, is an expensive under-used relic. However, the train was recognised as being a very secure way for the queen to complete overnight trips. The yearly cost of the Royal Train when it was introduced in 1977 for The Queen's Silver Jubilee was £1.9 million (equivalent to £11,163,063 in 2025), and has since been considerably reduced. Edward Leigh, the Conservative chairman of the House of Commons Public Accounts Committee, said the Royal Train was twice as expensive as using air travel but hardly luxurious. He said, "It's a rather Formica-laminated affair. I don't think it's that grand or that comfortable."

In the FY 2011, the Royal Train was used for 14 trips, averaging 931 miles (1,498 km). Ten trips were by The Prince of Wales, and four by The Queen and The Duke of Edinburgh. Nineteen nights were spent on the train during the course of the 14 trips. To control costs, Parliament permits the Royal Train to be used only by the King and Queen, or by the Prince and Princess of Wales.

In December 2020, the Duke and Duchess of Cambridge embarked on a three-day tour of England, Scotland, and Wales via the British Royal Train "to pay tribute to the inspiring work of individuals, organisations and initiatives across the country that have gone above and beyond to support their local communities" throughout the year. Prime Minister Boris Johnson expressed his support for the initiative, while First Minister of Scotland Nicola Sturgeon criticised the tour, citing travel restrictions; UK, Scottish and Welsh governments were consulted before planning the tour.

It was expected, following the announcement that Queen Elizabeth II had died on 8 September 2022 whilst at Balmoral Castle in Scotland, that the Royal Train would be used to convey the Queen's body from Edinburgh to London in preparation for her funeral. The use of the train had apparently been a long-standing part of plans prepared in the event that the Queen should die in Scotland. However, on 10 September, the Royal Household published details of arrangements for the funeral showing that the Queen's body would be conveyed by air instead.

In June 2025, it was announced that the Royal Train would be decommissioned before its maintenance contract ends in early 2027. The Keeper of the Privy Purse described the move as part of a broader effort toward “fiscal discipline” and modernising royal transport, with King Charles III supporting the decision.

== See also ==
- Royal Mews
- State and royal cars of the United Kingdom
- List of royal yachts of the United Kingdom
- Royal barge of the United Kingdom
- Air transport of the British royal family and government
- Purple Corridor
- Royal trains in Canada
