= DB Cargo Company Train =

Special train owned by DB Cargo UK

Company Train
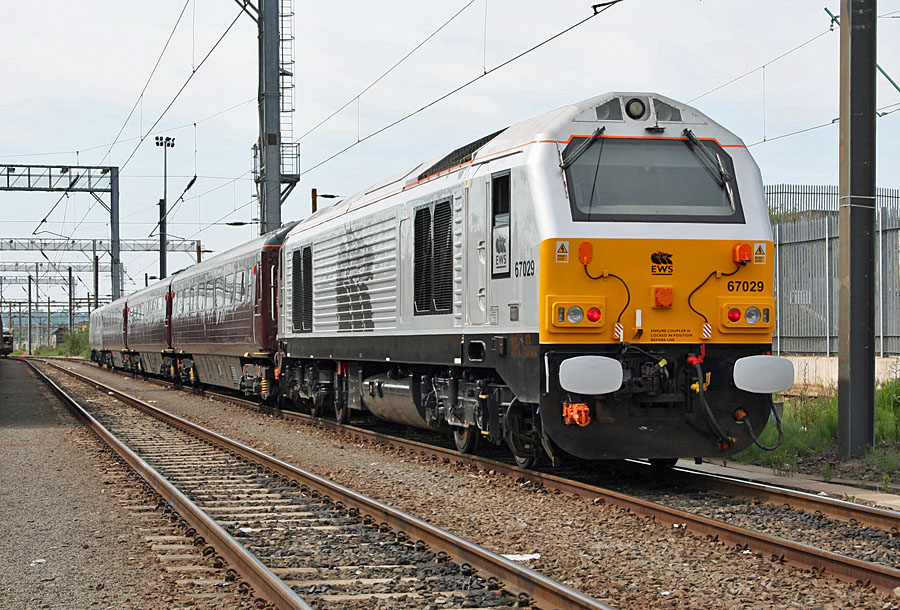
- 67029 with the DB Schenker Company Train, painted in a special EWS livery.
- In service: 19 October 2004—
- Manufacturers: Interfleet Technology; Engineering Support Group Limited (ESG); WillB Branding Consultants
- Replaced: Inspection saloons
- Formation: 5 vehicles
- Fleet numbers: 82146+ 10546+ 10211+ 11039+ 67029
- Operator: DB Cargo UK
- Depot: Toton TMD

Specifications
- Train length: 109 metres
- Platform height: (accessible from trackside)
- Maximum speed: Day: 110 mph (180 km/h); Night: 80 mph (130 km/h)
- Weight: 253 tonnes
- Prime mover: Class 67
- UIC classification: 2'2'+2'2'+2'2'+2'2'+Bo'Bo'
- Track gauge: 1,435 mm

The DB Cargo Company Train (formerly the DB Schenker Company Train and the EWS Company Train) is a special train operated in the United Kingdom by freight operator DB Cargo UK (formerly DB Schenker Rail (UK) formerly English Welsh & Scottish), a division of Deutsche Bahn. It was built as an inspection saloon replacement, and is also used to entertain corporate clients. The train cost £3 million and took only nine months from concept to completion.

The design concept of using a Class 67 locomotive and Mk3 DVT in push pull mode was subsequently adopted by passenger operators such as Chiltern Railways, Wrexham & Shropshire and Arriva Trains Wales for commercial operations.

== History and design ==
Shortly after Keith Heller was appointed CEO of EWS, Interfleet Technology was commissioned to design a private train for the company. The train was assembled as the replacement for the company's aging inspection saloon, and is used for entertaining corporate clients, for staff trips, managers, customers, functions, and as a "moving office". In the first year of its operation, the Macmillan Cancer Support charity were allowed to use the train too for fund-raising.

The fixed configuration set consists of three British Rail Mark 3 coaches between a Mark 3 driving van trailer and Class 67 locomotive. The interior of the train was converted to a business/office/corporate entertainment environment, including a 'conference coach' room with 50-inch cinema screen, and seven-metre-long conference table, a dining coach, and a sleeper coach with bedrooms and en-suite washing facilities.

The trainset was fitted with a wiring system allowing the Class 67 to work in push–pull mode with the DVT and Mark 3 coaches. (Note: 67029 is connected to the other vehicles using the AAR jumper, and RCH lighting control jumper cables, air brake pipe, main reservoir pipe, dual electric-train-supply connectors, Cab to Train data jumper; and (except for the locomotive) a central door locking jumper. If being worked by a Class 90 the 27-way AAR multiple working jumper, and Cab to Train data jumper are not connected.) In addition to normal inter-carriage connections this includes the addition of Multiple Working Jumper cable, and Cab to Train Data cable. The DVT retains its Time Division Multiplexer (TDM) support but this is isolated and non-operational unless the company train is operating in push-pull mode with a Class 90 locomotive. Locomotive 67029 was also modified to include a slight modification to the auto-couplers to enable connecting to the existing Mk3 buckeye couplers without touching the coach's rubbing plate—although it is normally attached using buffer-and-chain coupling. When not in use hauling the company train 67029 is used for normal railway working.

The train is explicitly exempted from regulations covering "Working of Passenger Trains Over Non-Passenger Lines", allowing the train to operate between freight depots without additional documentation requirements. The train does not carry passengers per-se—all those on-board are regarded as either staff or invited guests.

Formation of DB Company Train
Vehicle	Number	Livery	Notes
Class 67	67029	Silver (Note: The EWS (later DB) logos are grey, on a silver background.)	Locomotive (cab-mounted cameras)
Mk3a FO	11039	Maroon (Note: The maroon paint colour is darker than the standard EWS maroon colour.)	First Open, conference room and cinema
Mk3 RFM	10211 (Note: No. 10211, formerly No. 40510 ex-HST TRUK (Trailer Restaurant Unclassified Kitchen))	Maroon	Restaurant and bar facilities
Mk3a SLEP	10546	Maroon	Sleeper Either Pantry (5 bedrooms, 2 ensuite)
Mk3 DVT	82146	Silver	Driving Van Trailer with forward-facing camera

In February 2012, the EWS 'Three Beasties' logo on the train's locomotive and driving van trailer was replaced with a Deutsche Bahn 'DB' logo.
