= Rail Professional =

British railway magazine

- Cover of the March 2024 issue
- Categories: Rail transport
- Frequency: Monthly
- Publisher: Rail Professional Ltd
- Founded: 1996
- Country: United Kingdom
- Website: https://www.railpro.co.uk

Rail Professional is a monthly UK rail news magazine covering the business side of rail transport in Great Britain. It is published 10 times a year by Rail Professional Ltd.

Rail Professional also publishes an annual hardback guidebook titled "Rail Professional Industry Reference Book & Supply Chain Directory". As of 2024, the guidebook is in its tenth edition. These yearbooks provide up to date information on all the major train operating companies and light rail and tram networks across the country which includes route maps, key contacts, and serves as a one-stop shop for sourcing products and services from a rail supply chain of around 5,000 firms.

== History and profile ==
Rail Professional was established in 1996. The magazine was launched soon after the privatization of British Rail, with the aim of creating a forum for managers to communicate across the industry and stay updated on developments in other companies. Under British Rail, managers met regularly with their counterparts across the UK, but the fragmentation of the railways into separate train operating companies made it harder for managers to remain up-to-date on developments outside of their own organization. Rail Professional, launched by former British Rail manager Andrew Goodman, aimed to fill this gap.

== Content ==
Rail Professional covers rail news from train operating companies, Network Rail, the Department for Transport and other organizations related to the UK rail industry, featuring expert analysis and case studies alongside interviews from the biggest names in rail in its monthly magazine and on its website alongside commentary from professionals that work in the railway industry in the United Kingdom and around the world.

The editor, as of July 2023, is Sam Sherwood-Hale.

== Controversies ==
In September 2009, freight operator First GB Railfreight issued a 'clarification' on its website after an unguarded comment by its managing director John Smith, reported in Rail Professional, appeared to make a flippant reference to lifespan of one of his rivals. In an article celebrating ten years of GBRF, there was some discussion of the difficulties faced by the freight industry and the tendency of Keith Heller, the then head of the UK's largest rail freight carrier DB Schenker, to be outspoken on such matters. John Smith is quoted as saying: 'Someone does need to say these things, but I think he's pissing in the wind. The same with longer trains, which he also talks about. But Keith's 60, he'll certainly be dead before anything changes!'

After the article was published, a clarification appeared on First GBRf's website saying: 'The context of the remarks were made in reference to the frustrations and difficulties the freight industry faces compared to the passenger sector and John's remarks were intended to highlight the length of time it can take for freight issues to be addressed, as opposed to any slight on Keith himself.'

== See also ==
- List of railroad-related periodicals
