= British Rail Class 67 =

Class of diesel-electric locomotives

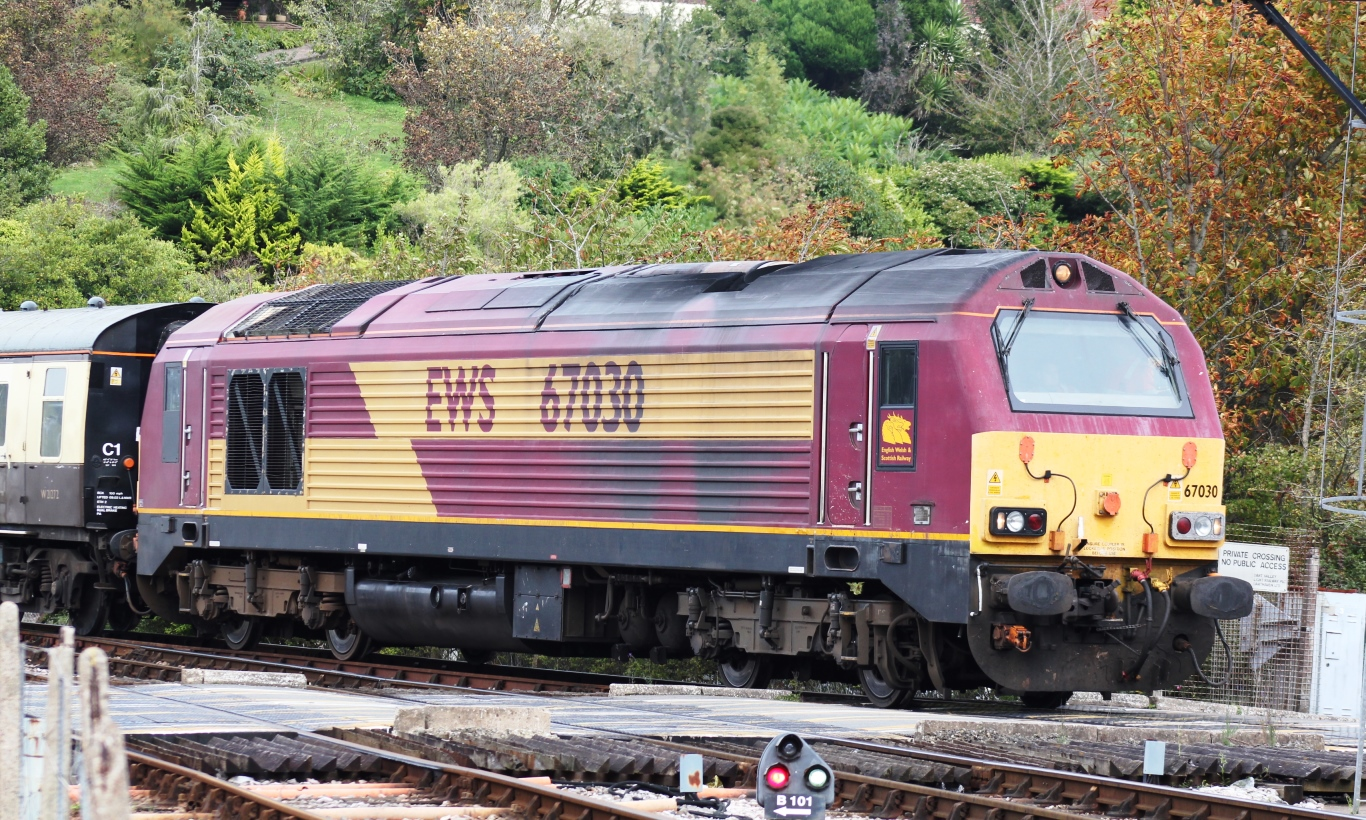
- 67030 in EWS livery (Kingswear 2017)
Type and origin
- Power type: Diesel-electric
- Builder: Alstom Meinfesa, Valencia
- Model: EMD JT42HW-HS
- Build date: 1999–2000
- Total produced: 30
Specifications
- Configuration
  - UIC: Bo′Bo′
  - Commonwealth: Bo-Bo
- Gauge: 1,435 mm (4 ft 8 1/2 in) standard gauge
- Wheel diameter: 965 mm (3 ft 2 in)
- Minimum curve: 75 m (3.7 ch)
- Wheelbase: Bogie wheelbase: 2.80 m (9 ft 2 in); Bogie pivots: 11.63 m (38 ft 2 in)
- Length: 19.71 m (64 ft 8 in)
- Width: 2.71 m (8 ft 11 in)
- Height: 3.93 m (12 ft 11 in)
- Loco weight: 88–90 tonnes (87–89 long tons; 97–99 short tons)
- Fuel type: Diesel
- Fuel capacity: 5,400 litres (1,190 imp gal; 1,430 US gal)
- Prime mover: EMD 12N-710G3B-EC
- Alternator: EMD AR9AC6HEX
- Traction motors: EMD D43FM
- MU working: AAR system (59, 66, 67, 68 008-015, 69, 70, and 73/9)
- Train heating: Electric Train Supply (index: 66 / 330 kW)
- Loco brake: Electropneumatic
- Safety systems: AWS; TPWS; ETCS (Note: Locomotive 67002 only, as part of 'first in class' testing for the East Coast Main Line digital signalling programme.)
Performance figures
- Maximum speed: Design speed: 125 mph (201 km/h)
- Power output: Engine: 3,200 bhp (2,386 kW) @900 rpm; At rail: 2,500 hp (1,864 kW); Continuous: 92 kN (20,700 lbf) @75 km/h (47 mph)
- Brakeforce: 780 kN (78 long tons-force)
Career
- Operators: Colas Rail; DB Cargo UK; Transport For Wales
- Numbers: 67001–67030
- Nicknames: Skips
- Axle load class: Route availability 8
- Current owner: DB Cargo UK; Colas Rail (Only 67023, 67027); Transport For Wales (Only 67026, 67028)
- Disposition: 21 in service, 6 stored, 3 scrapped
- Sources: except where noted

The Class 67 locomotives are a class of Bo-Bo diesel-electric locomotives that were built for the English Welsh & Scottish Railway (EWS) between 1999 and 2000 by Alstom at Meinfesa in Valencia, Spain with drive components (engine, generator and traction motors) from General Motors' Electro-Motive Division.

EMD's designation for this locomotive type is JT42HW-HS.

== History ==
=== Design, testing and introduction ===
EWS ordered thirty locomotives via leasing company Angel Trains in a £45 million contract split between Alstom and Electro Motive Diesel, for use as Class 47 replacements for hauling high-speed Royal Mail trains and passenger trains. The locomotives were obtained on a 15-year lease from Angel Trains. At the end of the fifteen-year contract, ownership of the locomotives was transferred to DB Cargo UK.

The bodyshell is a monocoque load-bearing Alstom design, the bogies are an "H" frame Alstom design, the engine, traction motors and control electronics are GM-EMD products, and the same as used in the Class 66. Unlike the Class 66, the traction motors are frame mounted rather than axle hung to reduce unsprung mass and the gear ratio is increased allowing higher speeds. The cab design has a central driving position.

The locomotives are able to provide Electric Train Supply for passenger train heating and air-conditioning, and are equipped for both buffers and chain couplers and buckeye couplers, the latter attached by a swing arm mount.

High-speed running tests were undertaken with 67002 starting at Alstom's facility at La Sagra (Toledo, Spain) and running on the standard gauge Madrid-Toledo high-speed rail line. A top speed of 143 miles per hour (230 km/h) was obtained.

The first locomotive to be delivered was 67003, which arrived in October 1999. Initial plans were for a rapid acceptance into service, however, problems with the locomotives being slightly out of loading gauge caused delays. Acceptance trials began in December of that year, and all 30 units had been delivered to the UK by early 2000.

The high axle load of the locomotive caused an initial speed restriction to 110 mph (177 km/h) and modifications to the bogies were required; locomotive 67023 was passed for 125 mph (201 km/h) running in July 2001, and all 30 units had been modified by June 2003.

== Operations ==
=== DB Cargo UK ===
The type was initially used primarily on mail trains. In June 2003, EWS lost the Royal Mail mail train contract, with services diminishing to complete cessation in March 2004.

The locomotives have since been used by First ScotRail on the Caledonian Sleeper on non-electrified lines north of Edinburgh. In April 2015, GB Railfreight commenced a contract to haul the Caledonian Sleeper with 67004 repainted and renamed for use on the service. When GB Railfreight started to provide the trains and crews for the Serco franchise in 2015, it was planned to use rebuilt Class 73/9s. The first of these came into service in February 2016 but the Class 67s continued to be used on some services for another couple of years.

Class 67s are also used as Thunderbird rescue locomotives, for failed trains on the East Coast Main Line, on some freight trains, and for use on chartered tourist trains. Two locomotives were assigned to, and received special liveries for use with the Royal Train from 2003, and a third had a commemorative jubilee livery applied for use with the Royal Train during the Diamond Jubilee of Elizabeth II in 2012.

Five locomotives were also dedicated to Wrexham & Shropshire's services until it ceased operating in January 2011.

Chiltern Railways began using ex-Wrexham & Shropshire Class 67 hauled passenger sets in December 2010, in September 2011 after improvements to the Chiltern Main Line infrastructure, Chiltern began running a 100 mph (160 km/h) service from London to Birmingham branded Mainline using Class 67 powered sets. Chiltern Railways leased six Class 68s from December 2014, to replace Class 67s on its Chiltern Main Line services.

In December 2023, DB Cargo UK listed 10 Class 67s for sale.

=== Colas Rail ===
In January 2017, DB Cargo UK sold 67023 and 67027 to Colas Rail, which were repainted at Toton TMD for use on Network Rail infrastructure monitoring trains. In December 2018, these two Class 67s were included in a sale of 67 France and UK based locomotives to Beacon Rail Leasing. They were subsequently leased back to Colas Rail.

=== Transport for Wales Rail ===
The Transport for Wales Premier Service was originally introduced in 2008 running between Holyhead and Cardiff Central via Chester, Shrewsbury and the Marches Line to Newport. The original operator of this service was Arriva Trains Wales, using subleased Virgin Trains West Coast Class 57s. In 2012, these were replaced by DB Schenker Class 67s.

The use of Class 67s was expanded in January 2023, with TfW eventually leasing 12 locomotives from DB Cargo UK. These Class 67s have been fitted to allow Push-Pull operation with the rakes of British Rail Mark 4 coaches with a Driving Van Trailer at the opposite end to the locomotive. These Class 67s operate in a number of different liveries.

== Former operators ==
=== GBRf ===
In mid-2022, GBRf took over the leases for 67023 and 67027, though issues with the locomotives meant that GBRf did not take over their operation until November 2022 when 67023 was moved to Scotland to start work on the Caledonian Sleeper contract on the Edinburgh – Inverness legs of the Highland diagrams. 67027 moved to Arlington Works (Eastleigh) for a repaint into GBRf livery, with maintenance work also being completed. 67023 ran its first Caledonian Sleeper diagram in December 2022.

In June 2023, 67027 was returned from GBRf to Colas, being stripped of its GBRf branding and having Colas decals applied. 67023 was also returned to Colas later in the year.

== Fleet ==
=== Illustrations ===
Diagram of a Class 67 in a blank livery.

=== Fleet List ===
Locomotives that do not currently carry their names are shown with the name in brackets.

Key:	In service	Stored	Scrapped

Number	Name	Operator	Livery	Status	Notes
67001	(Night Mail)	DB Cargo UK	Arriva Blue	In service	
67002	(Special Delivery)	DB Cargo UK	DB Cargo	In service	Involved in a serious crash at Lawrence Hill, Bristol in November 2000.
67003		DB Cargo UK	Arriva Blue	Scrapped	Scrapped at EMR at Kingsbury on 27 May 2025
67004	Cairn Gorm (Post Haste)	DB Cargo UK	DB Cargo UK Red	In service	
67005	King's Messenger (British Royal Train locomotive)	DB Cargo UK	Royal Claret	In service	
67006	Royal Sovereign (British Royal Train locomotive)	DB Cargo UK	Royal Claret	In service	
67007		DB Cargo UK	Queens Platinum Jubilee Purple and White	In Service	Operational As of June 2022
67008		DB Cargo UK	Transport for Wales Rail Red And White	In service	Leased to Transport for Wales Rail for Premier Services
67009		DB Cargo UK	EWS Maroon & Gold	Stored	Stored October 2016
67010	(Unicorn)	DB Cargo UK	DB Cargo UK Red	In service	Leased to Transport for Wales Rail for Premier Services
67011		DB Cargo UK	EWS Maroon & Gold	Stored	Stored June 2016
67012	(A Shropshire Lad)	DB Cargo UK	Wrexham & Shropshire Silver	In service	Leased to Transport for Wales Rail for Premier Services
67013	(Dyfrbont Pontcysyllte)	DB Cargo UK	DB Cargo UK Red	In service	Leased to Transport for Wales Rail for Premier Services
67014	(Thomas Telford)	DB Cargo UK	Transport for Wales Rail Red & White	In service	Leased to Transport for Wales Rail for Premier Services
67015	(David J Lloyd)	DB Cargo UK	DB Cargo UK Red	In service	Leased to Transport for Wales Rail for Premier Services
67016		DB Cargo UK	Transport for Wales Rail Black & Red	In service	Leased to Transport for Wales Rail for Premier Services
67017	Arrow	DB Cargo UK	Transport for Wales Rail Red & White	In service	Leased to Transport for Wales Rail for Premier Services
67018	Keith Heller (Rapid)	DB Cargo UK	DB Cargo UK Red with Maple Leaf	Stored	Stored March 2019
67019		DB Cargo UK	EWS Maroon & Gold	Scrapped	Scrapped at EMR Kingsbury in December 2025
67020		DB Cargo UK	Transport for Wales Rail Black & Red	In service	Leased to Transport for Wales Rail for Premier Services
67021		DB Cargo UK	Belmond British Pullman Brown & Cream	In service	
67022		DB Cargo UK	Transport for Wales Rail Black & Red	In service	Leased to Transport for Wales Rail for Premier Services
67023	Stella	Colas Rail	Debranded Colas Rail Yellow & Orange	In service	Returned to Colas by GBRf
67024		DB Cargo UK	Belmond British Pullman Brown & Cream	In service	
67025	(Western Star)	DB Cargo UK	Transport for Wales Rail Red & White	In service	Leased to Transport for Wales Rail for Premier Services
67026	Diamond Jubilee	Transport for Wales Rail	Jubilee Silver	Stored	Stored June 2016. Sold to Transport for Wales Rail May 2024
67027	(Rising Star) (Charlotte)	Colas Rail	GB Railfreight with Colas decals	In service	Returned to Colas by GBRf
67028		Transport for Wales Rail	DB Cargo UK Red	In service	Sold to Transport for Wales Rail May 2024
67029	Royal Diamond	DB Cargo UK	DB Cargo UK Silver	In service	Leased to Transport for Wales Rail for Premier Services
67030	Schenker	DB Cargo UK	EWS Maroon & Gold	Scrapped	Scrapped at EMR Kingsbury in December 2025

== Liveries and namings ==
The locomotives were initially painted in EWS's maroon and yellow livery. In 2003, 67005 and 67006 replaced the two previous Class 47 locomotives hauling the Royal Train. These were repainted in the Royal Claret colour and named Queen's Messenger and Royal Sovereign, respectively, in December 2000 and February 2005.

In October 2004, 67029 was repainted silver, with full bodyside height EWS logos, to haul the EWS Company Train. On 12 October 2007, 67029 was named Royal Diamond at Rugeley Trent Valley railway station, in honour of the 60th wedding anniversary of Queen Elizabeth II and Prince Philip.

In 2008, 67012–67015 were repainted in Wrexham & Shropshire's silver and grey livery. In 2008, these were named A Shropshire Lad (3 July), Dyfrbont Pontcysyllte (9 July), Thomas Telford (14 July) and David J Lloyd (16 May), respectively. These were joined by 67010 in March 2009, to add resilience to the sub-fleet. The sub-fleet was dispersed at the end of 2014, with locomotives receiving further repaints appropriate to their new roles.

In January 2010, 67018 was repainted into DB Schenker red with a maple leaf and named Keith Heller at the National Railway Museum. in honour of the Canadian-born former EWS and DB Schenker UK chairman.

In 2011, 67001–67003 were repainted into Arriva Trains Wales blue livery, although without any company decals, for use on the daily Cardiff-Holyhead service.

In March 2012, 67026 received a silver livery, union flag and Diamond Jubilee logo for use during the Diamond Jubilee of Elizabeth II celebrations, being named Diamond Jubilee by Queen Elizabeth II on 23 March at London Victoria station.

In March 2015, 67004 received the Caledonian 'Midnight Teal' livery and was named Cairn Gorm. This, along with similarly repainted 67010, was used on the non-electrified parts of the Serco Caledonian Sleeper until the release of sufficient Class 73/9s for use by GB Railfreight. Both 67004 and 67010 have since been repainted into DB Cargo red livery, and are now both operational (67004 being stored for nearly two years).

In June 2017, Colas Rail duo 67023 and 67027 received the names Stella and Charlotte, respectively, on nameplates carried centrally on the bodysides.

During October 2017, saw 67021 and 67024 rolled out in (unbranded) Belmond British Pullman umber and cream livery, receiving Belmond British Pullman logos a few months later.

In October 2018, the Royal locomotives, 67005 and 67006, were repainted into a slightly revised version of the Royal claret livery.

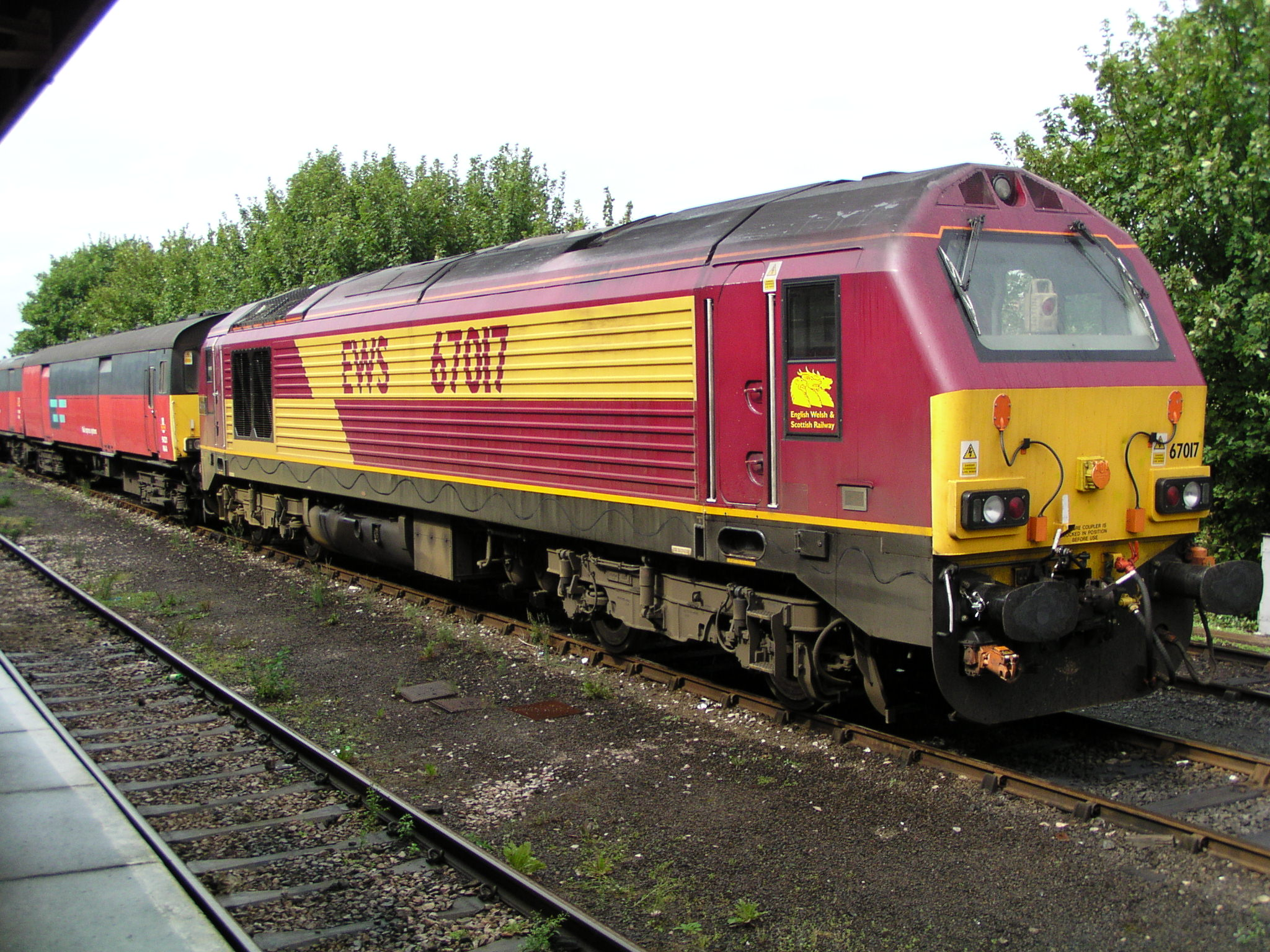
Original EWS livery (67017, Plymouth 2003)

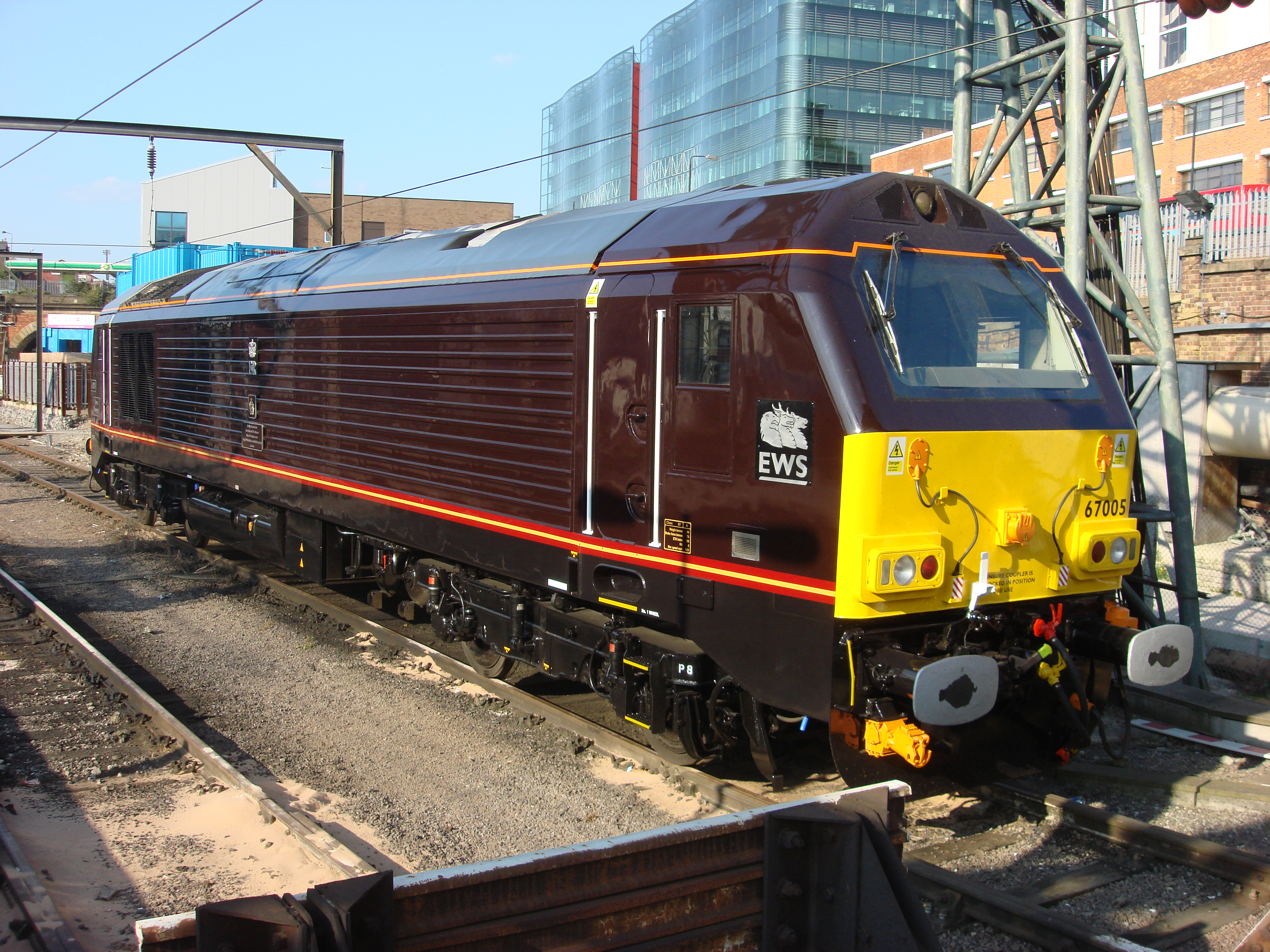
Royal Train livery (67005, King's Cross 2008)

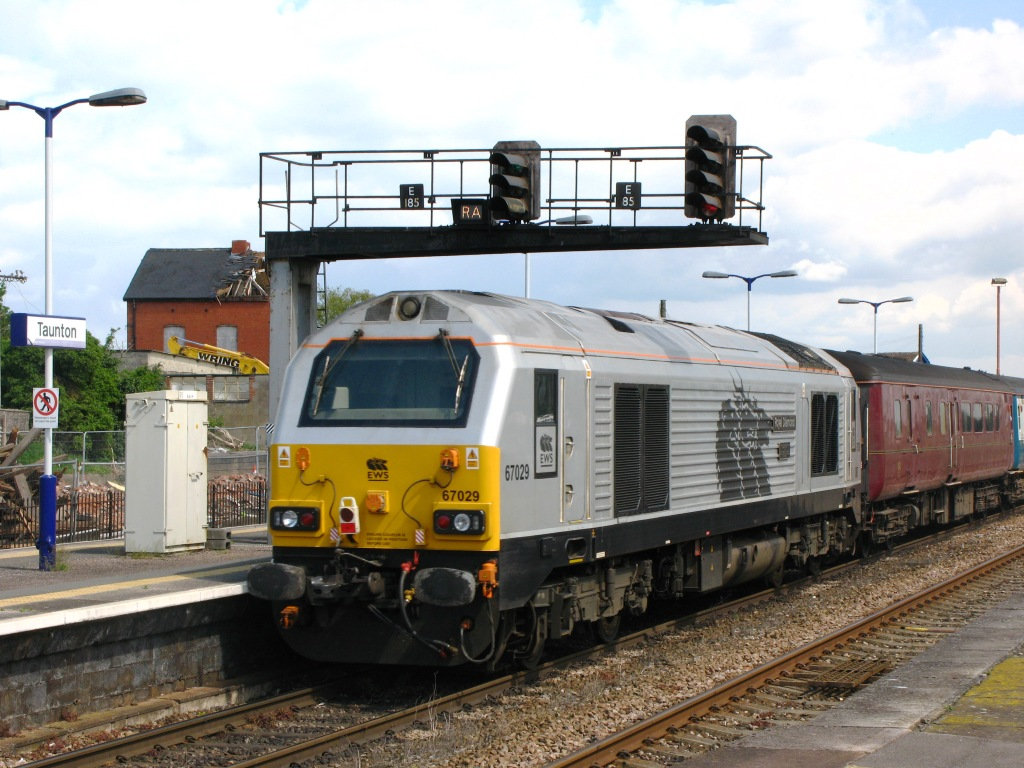
Silver jubilee livery (67029, Taunton 2010)

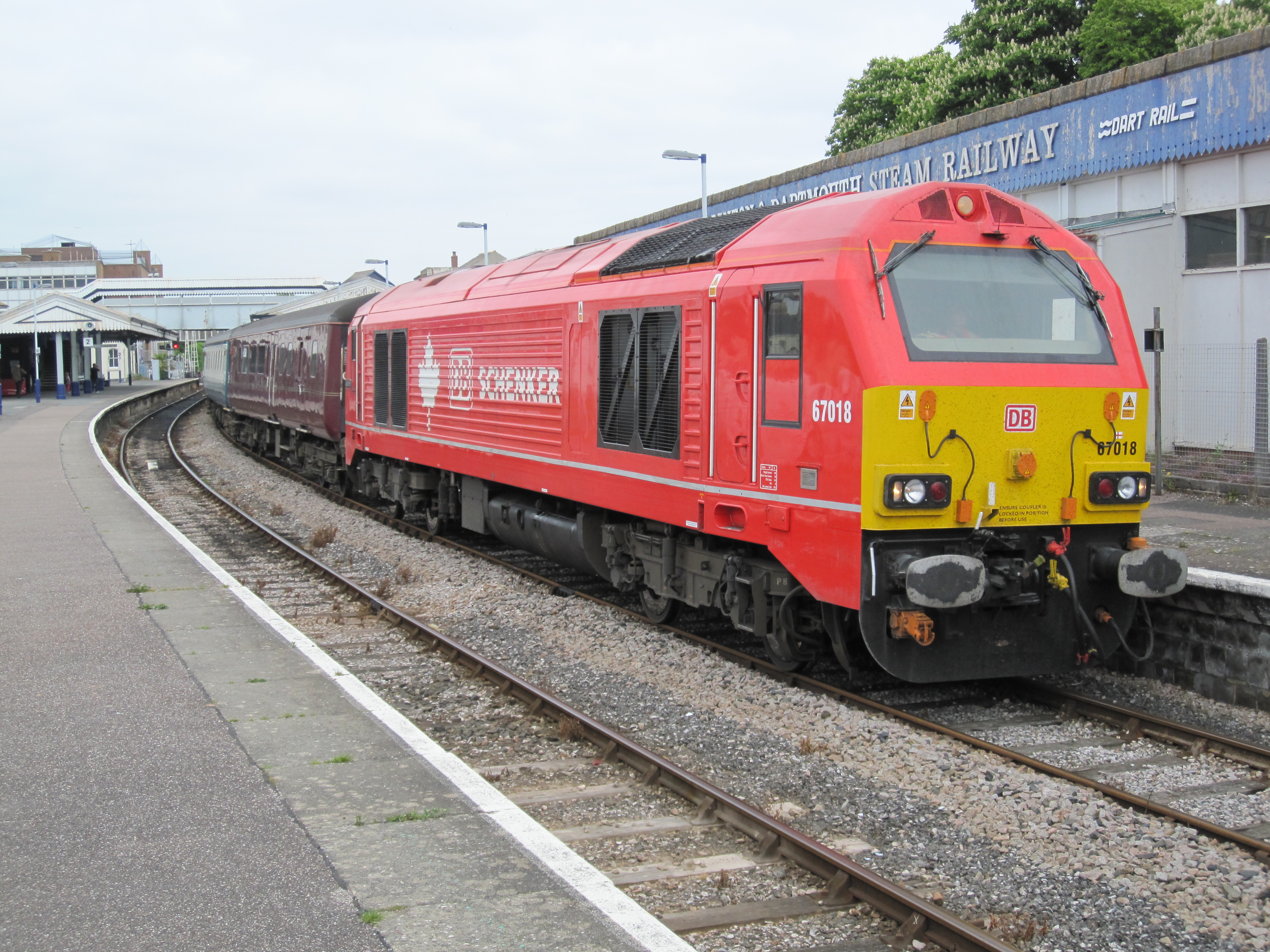
DB Schenker livery (67018, Paignton 2010)

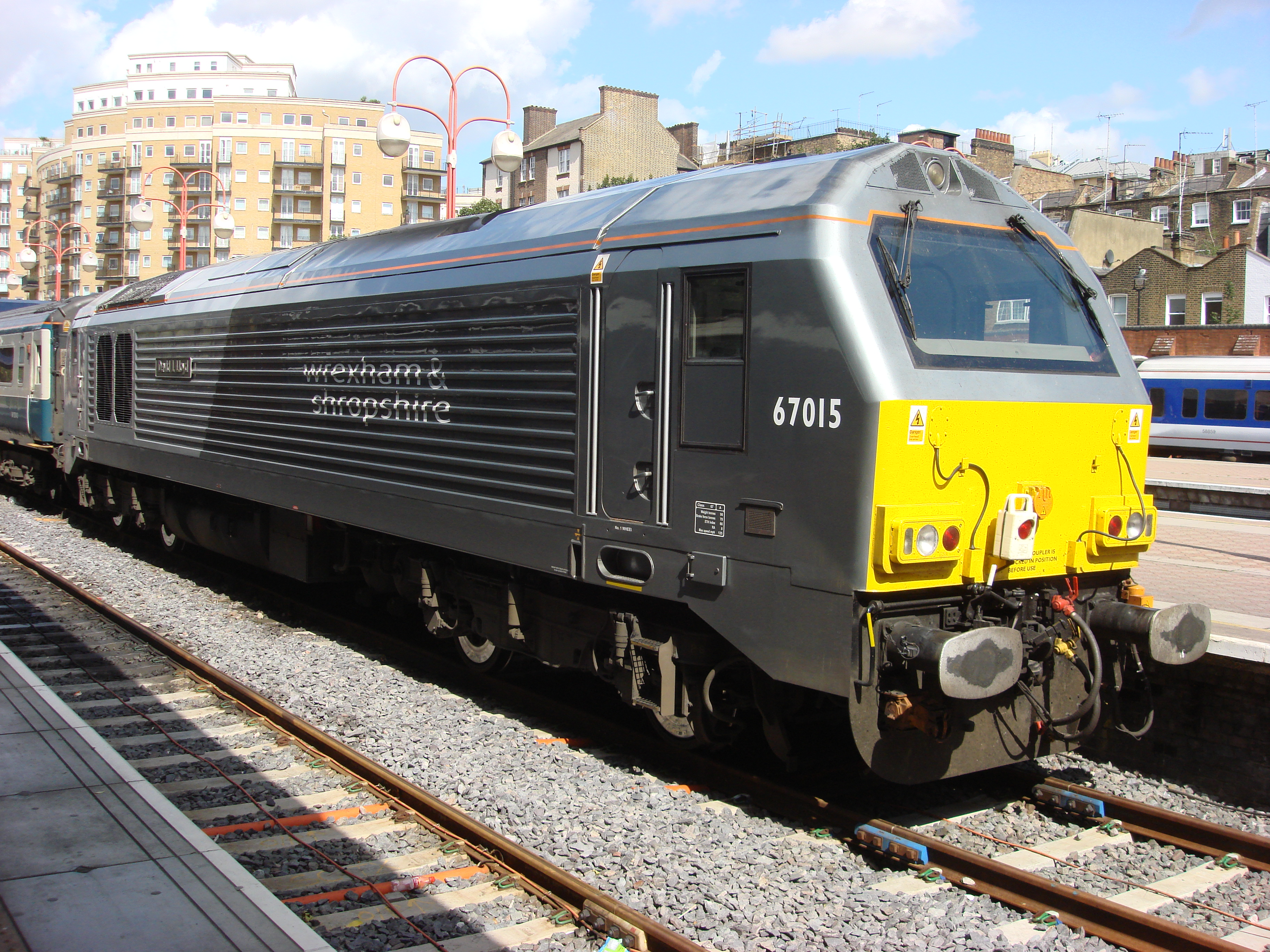
67015 in Wrexham & Shropshire livery (Marylebone 2008)

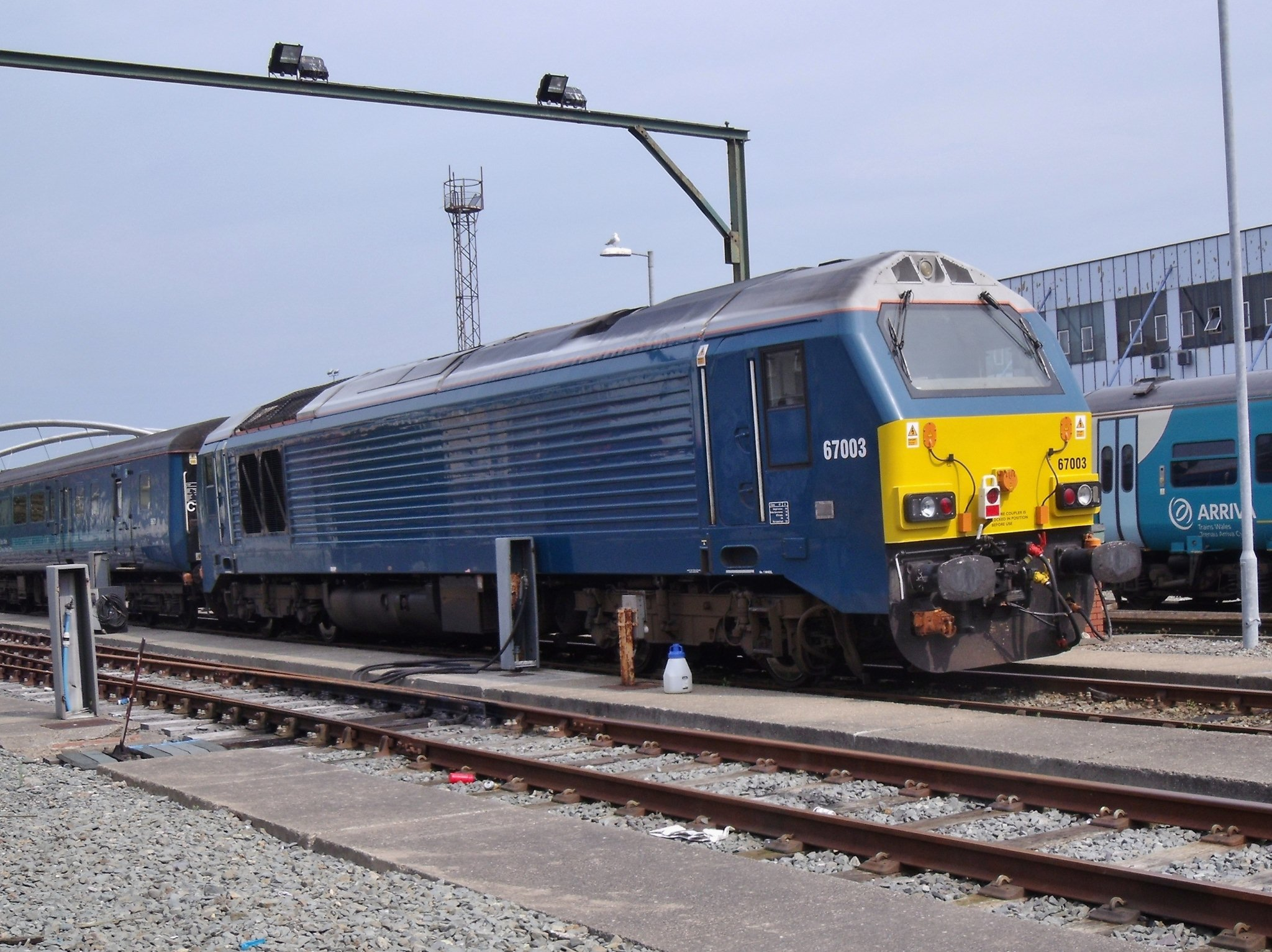
Arriva livery (67003, Holyhead 2012)

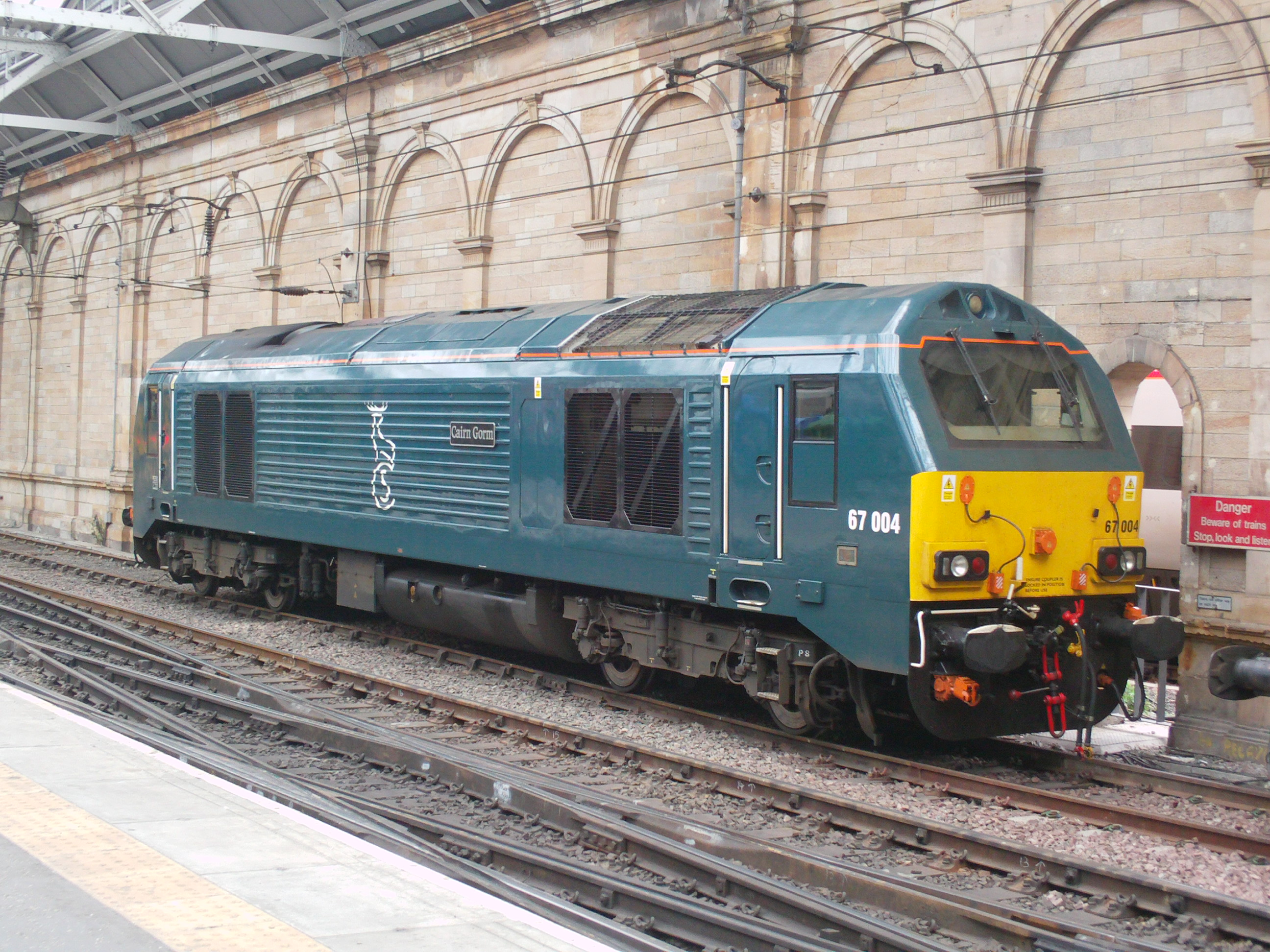
Caledonian Sleeper livery (67004, Edinburgh Waverley 2015)

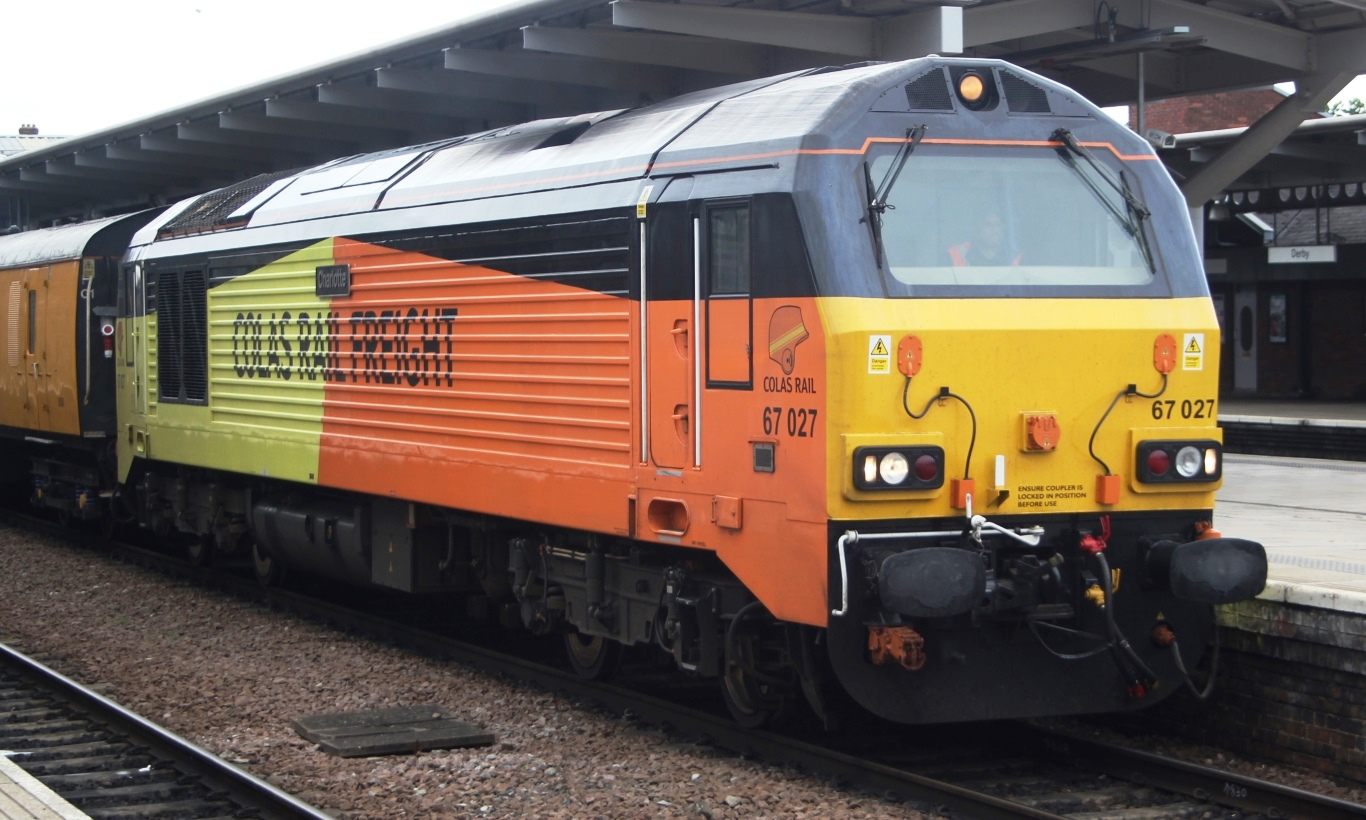
Colas Rail livery (67027, Derby 2017)

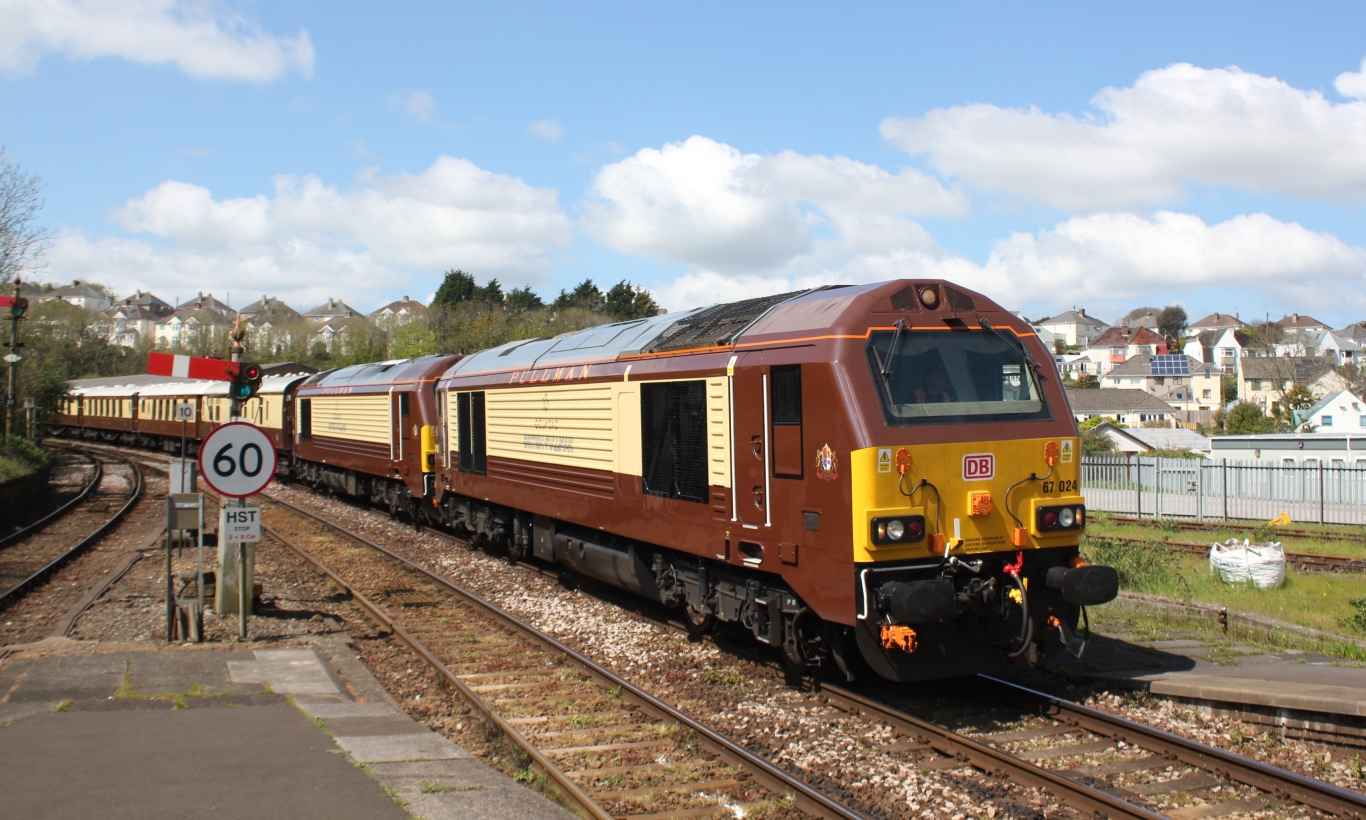
Pullman livery (67024 & 67021, Truro 2018)

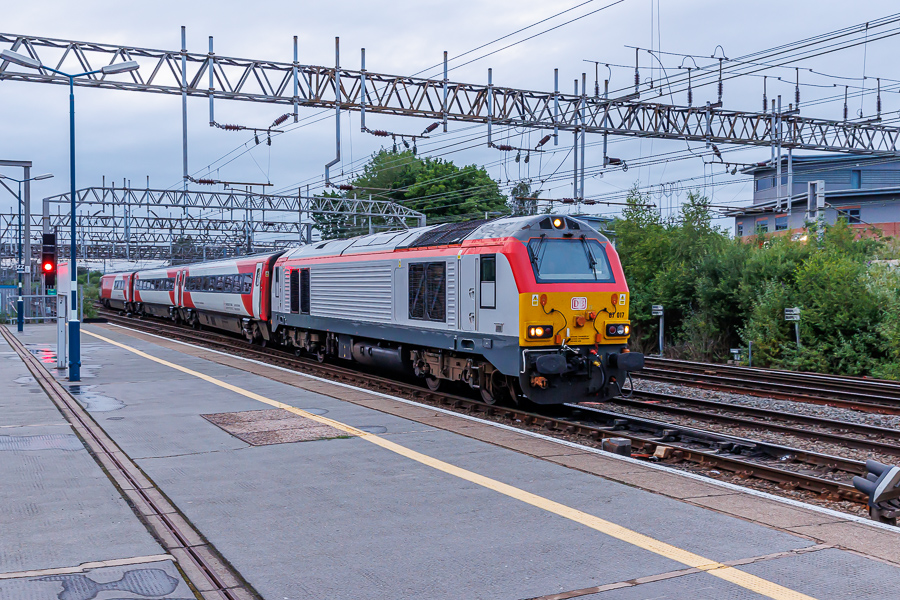
Transport for Wales Silver & Red livery (67017, Crewe 2024)

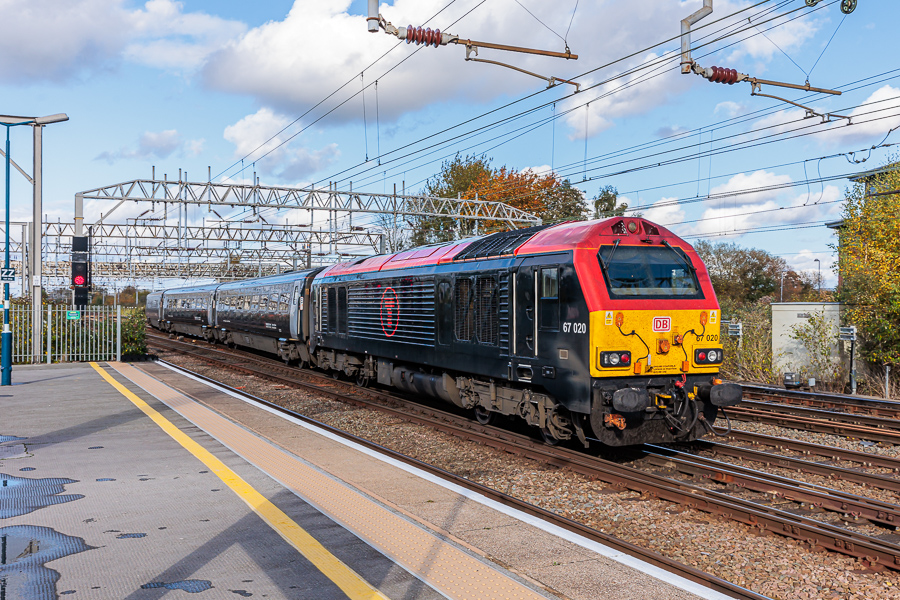
Transport for Wales Black & Red livery (67020, Crewe 2024)

== Incidents ==
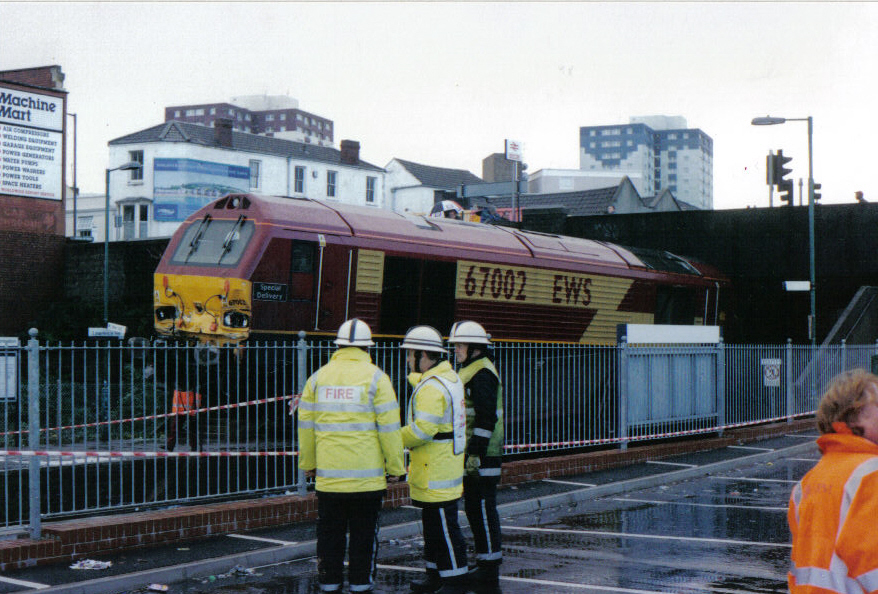
67002 at Lawrence Hill

A serious crash occurred with 67002 at Lawrence Hill (Bristol) on 1 November 2000, when a Royal Mail train passed two red signals and ran into the back of a coal train at around 3:30 am. The mail train, hauled by 67002 "Special Delivery" with 67012 at the rear, was travelling at 50 miles per hour (80 km/h) when the incident occurred. The locomotive climbed over the back of the coal train, coming to rest 40 yards (37 m) later on top of a coal wagon and against the A420 Church Road bridge. The driver of the mail train suffered a broken arm and cuts to the face and chest, but there were no other injuries. The incident was initially suspected to be caused by faulty brakes but was later found to be caused by misunderstanding and incorrect use of the locomotive's brake pipe isolation valve by railway staff.

== Model railways ==
In 2006, Hornby Railways launched its first version of the BR Class 67 in OO gauge range in a variety of liveries. The class 67 is also one of the few British locomotives commercially available in T Scale.

== See also ==
- The Israel Railways JT 42BW and Renfe Class 333.3 are a similar design
- Vossloh Euro 4000 – Related locomotives built at the same factory (former Alstom Valencia plant)

== References and sources ==
=== Sources ===
- Fox, Peter; Hall, Peter; Pritchard, Robert (2004). British Railways Locomotives & coaching stock 2004. Sheffield: Platform 5. ISBN 1-902336-39-9.
- Waller, Mike (December 2010). "Skips for Hire" (PDF). The Marlow Donkey. No. 131. Marlow & District Railway Society. pp. 13–16. (some minor inaccuracies in article)
