= Elmira District Secondary School =

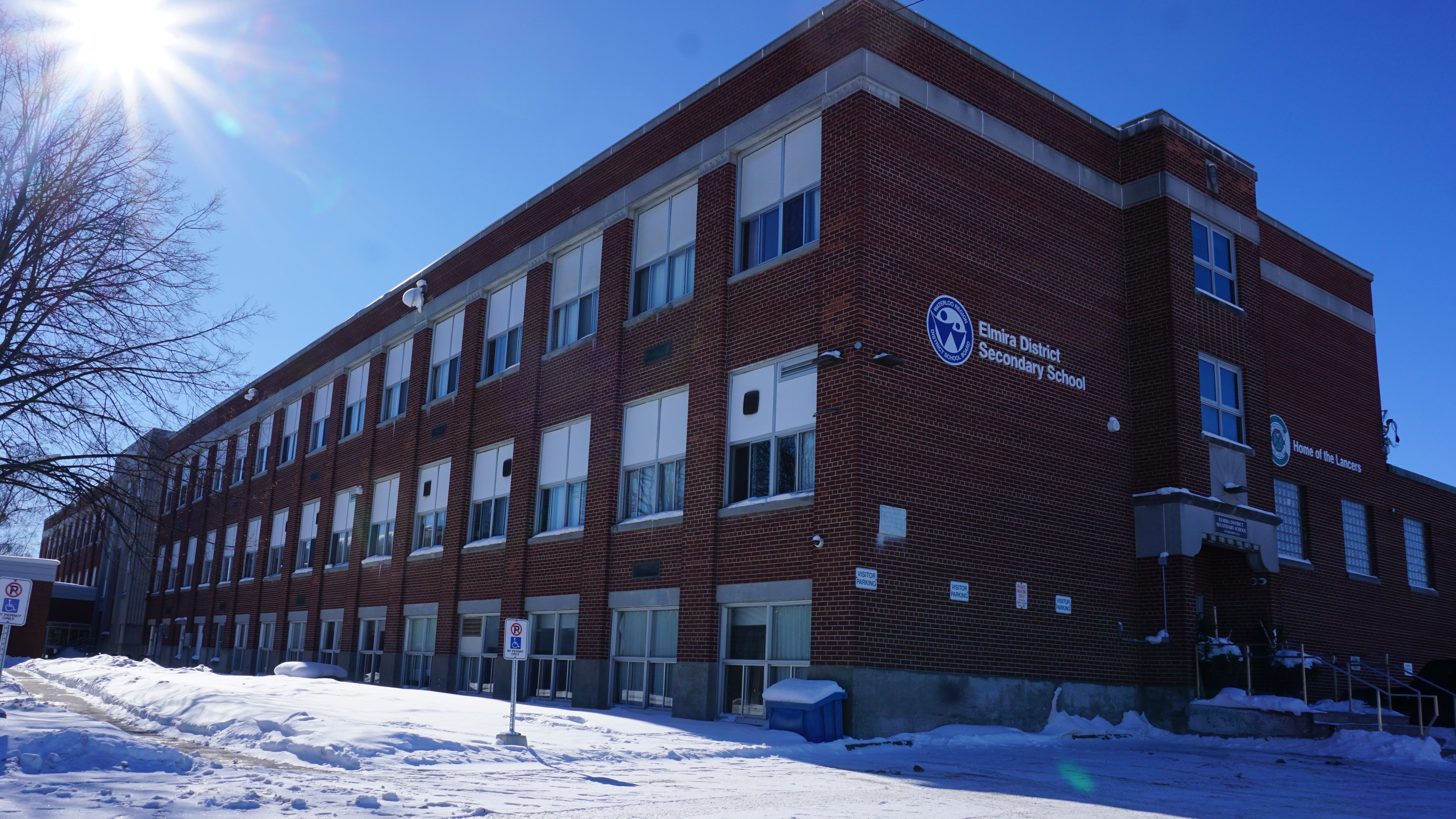

Location
- 4 University Ave. W Elmira, Ontario, N3B 1K2; Canada; 43°35′40.15″N 80°33′37.61″W

Information
- School type: Public, high school
- Motto: Ab obscuritate ad lucem ("From darkness into light")
- Established: 1939
- School board: Waterloo Region District School Board
- School number: 908142
- Principal: Sandy Millar
- Staff: 102
- Grades: 9-12
- Enrollment: 1 308 (November 2017)
- Language: English
- Colours: Green, grey, black and white
- Team name: Lancers
- Website: eds.wrdsb.ca
- Last updated: September 1st, 2024

Elmira District Secondary School (EDSS) is a secondary school serving the town of Elmira, Ontario, Canada and the surrounding area.

== Notable alumni ==
- Malcolm Gladwell — Canadian journalist, author, public speaker, writer for The New Yorker since 1996.
- Bruce Headlam — Canadian Journalist, Media Desk Editor of The New York Times.
- Keith Heller — head of Canadian National Railway east division, and DB Schenker Rail co-chair in Europe
- Roger Martin — Dean of the Rotman School of Management at the University of Toronto from 1998 to 2013 and an author of several business books.
- Paul Frey — opera singer.
- Paul Straus — president and director of Home Hardware.
- Garrett Rank — referee in the National Hockey League, professional golfer.
- Ken Seiling — chair for the Regional Municipality of Waterloo from 1985 to 2018.
- Sarah Mercey — animator.
- Lucas Bryant — actor

== See also ==
- Education in Ontario
- List of secondary schools in Ontario
