= Rail-Veyor =

Light-rail haulage solution

Railveyor
- Type: Private
- Industry: Mining, material handling, material hauling
- Founded: 1999
- Founder: Risto Laamanen
- Headquarters: Sudbury, Ontario, Canada
- Key people: Jim Fisk, Executive Chairman; Ron Russ, CEO; Mike Dibble, Inventor; Joe Capers, Inventor
- Website: Railveyor

Railveyor is a remote controlled, electrically powered light-rail haulage solution for surface and underground applications in the mining and aggregate industries. Railveyor Technologies Global Inc. is a private Sudbury, Canada-based industrial bulk material handling and material haulage company that manufactures and installs Railveyor systems.

== History ==
Railveyor's light-rail system was first demonstrated by its inventor, Mike Dibble, in conjunction with the Florida Institute of Phosphate Research from 1999-2001. Since then it has been installed commercially by Harmony Gold at its Phakisa Gold Mine in Free State, South Africa. Canadian entrepreneur Risto Laamanen incorporated the business, secured the global distribution rights, and set up a second demonstration and test site with Vale S.A. at their Frood Stobie mine in Sudbury, Ontario, Canada in 2008. Following successful testing of the system at the Frood Stobie test site, a Railveyor system was installed at Vale's Copper Cliff Mine 114 Ore Body Mine and became operational in 2012, with the intention of using the Railveyor system as an enabling technology for rapid mine development and high speed production.

Risto Laamanen died on July 7, 2009, but the Laamanen family continue to be large investors in the private company, Railveyor Technologies Global Inc., along with investors from Canada and the United States of America.

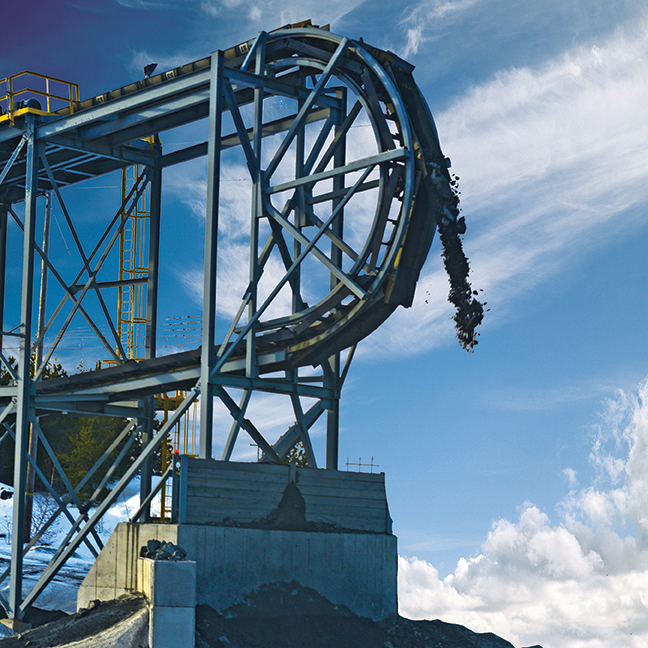
Railveyor transporting cargo.

== About ==
The Railveyor system incorporates a remotely operated electrically powered series of two wheeled railcars driven by power stations located along on a light-rail track. Because the cars are remotely operated and compact in size, they can be used as an enabling technology for rapid development and high speed production at the working face. The Railveyor system can reduce capital costs and infrastructure, travelling below shafts and in spaces as small as 10 by 12 feet or 3.05 m by 3.66 m. Using multiple train systems in tandem optimizes continuous material haulage. The railcars can travel at variable speeds up to 18 mph, or 8 metres/second, and climb grades of 20%. The company claims that the system combines the best features of conveyors, rail, and truck haulage, including travelling on 20% inclines, increased capacity and availability, reduced installation time, a small profile, and a short turning radius of 95 feet or 30 m. The system is used for underground and surface applications in the mining and aggregate industries.

== Awards ==
- 2013 Bell Canada Business Excellence Award for Innovation
- 2020 Mining Cleantech Challenge winner
