= East Coast Joint Stock =

Fleet of passenger railway coaches in the UK

The East Coast Joint Stock (ECJS) was a fleet of passenger railway coaches in the UK jointly owned by the Great Northern Railway (GNR), the North Eastern Railway (NER) and the North British Railway (NBR). These were the main operators of the East Coast Main Line prior to the creation of the London and North Eastern Railway at grouping in 1923.

The GNR, NER and NBR, together with the Edinburgh and Glasgow Railway and the Scottish Central Railway, which between them owned the railway lines connecting London (King's Cross) and Perth via York, Edinburgh (Waverley) and Stirling came to an agreement in November 1855 regarding "the East Coast Route" and how the traffic over that route was to be obtained and shared. At first, the carriages used for the through services were provided by the different companies, but in 1860 representatives of the GNR, NER and NBR met to agree the setting up of "a common East Coast stock of passenger carriages", which was finalised in August–September 1860. There were to be fifty carriages, costing a total of £13,450, to be apportioned according to the respective mileages of the companies which operated the London-Edinburgh services: GNR £6,425; NER £5,080; NBR £1,945. The ECJS was set up in 1861 when it comprised 50 coaches; there were 63 in 1865, and 89 in 1873. On 21 May 1872, 36 coaches were allocated to services running between London (King's Cross) and Edinburgh (Waverley); 17 to services between London and Glasgow (Queen Street); and 24 to services between London and Aberdeen.

== Preservation ==
A number of former ECJS vehicles remain extant on various heritage railways and at the NRM, some being over 100 years old. These include: Dining Car no. 189, built in 1894, withdrawn in 1927 and transferred to departmental use, which is now owned by the London and North Eastern Coach Association (LNERCA) and located at the North Yorkshire Moors Railway; three vehicles from the Royal Train, built in 1908 and which are now part of the National Collection: the two Royal Saloons – no. 395 (built for the use of King Edward VII) and no. 396 (for the use of Queen Alexandra and Princess Victoria) – both of which had been withdrawn in 1978; and brake van no. 109 (originally no. 82), which had run until 1961.
