= Alstom Prima diesel locomotives =

Diesel-electric locomotive

Prima
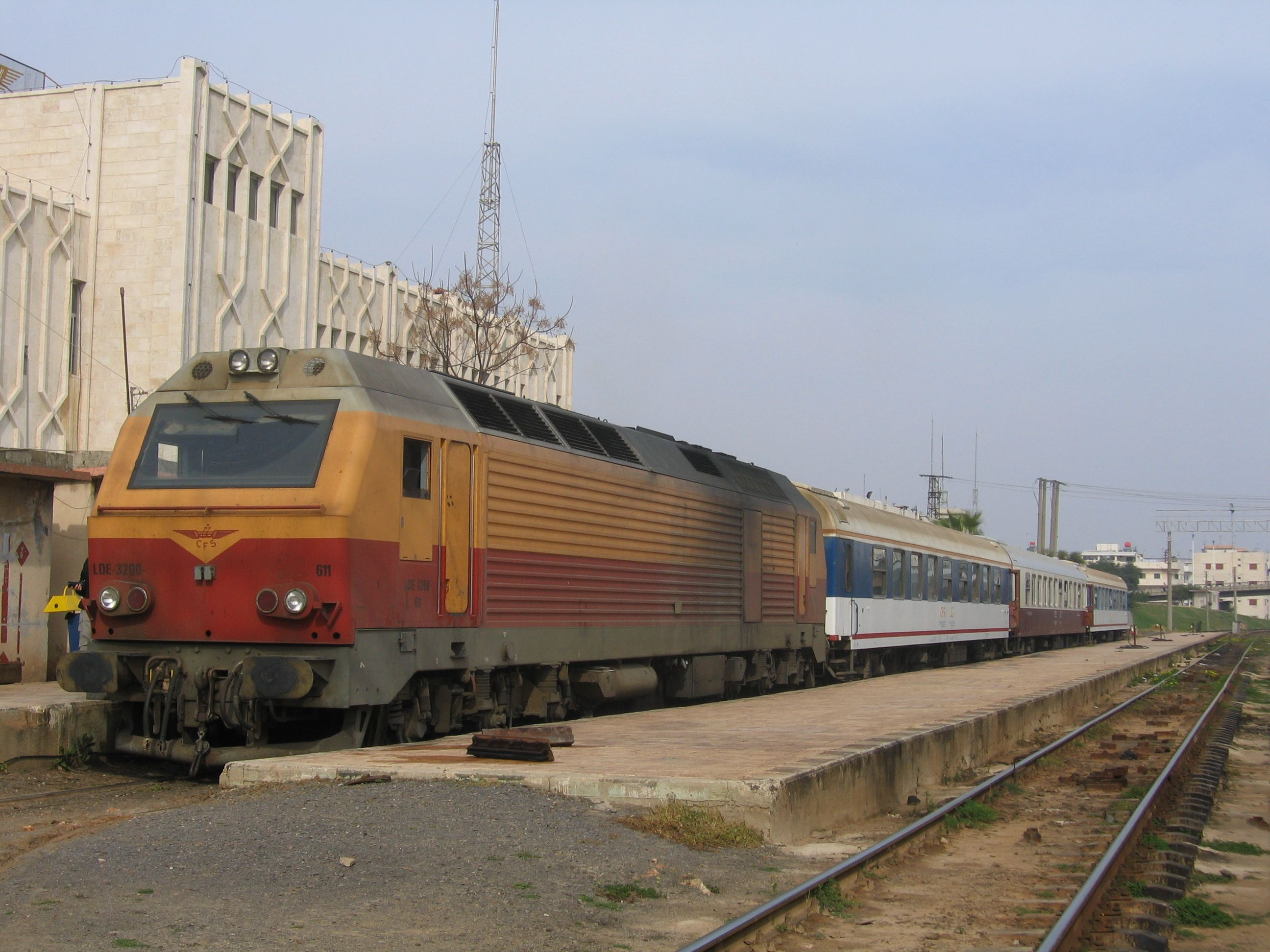
- A Syrian Railways Prima DE 32 AC
Type and origin
- Power type: Diesel
- Builder: Alstom with engine from EMD or Ruston; Except BB 47500: Alstom / Siemens with engine from MTU
Specifications
- Transmission: Diesel electric

The Prima Diesel-electric locomotives are a class of medium and heavy, four- and six-axle, passenger and freight mainline locomotives. They have been built both to 1,435 mm (4 ft 8 1/2 in) standard and 1,668 mm (5 ft 5 21/32 in) broad gauges, and find use in the Middle East, Europe and North America. Alstom is the primary designer in cooperation with both General Motors (now EMD) and Siemens.

== History ==
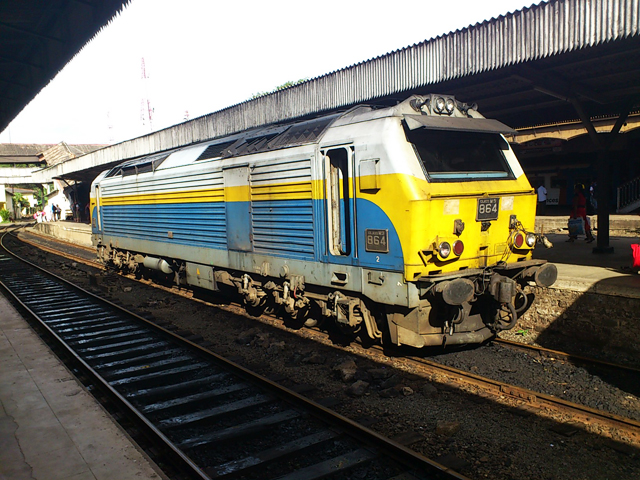
AD32C Locomotive (M9) Operated By Sri Lanka Railways

Initially the Prima locomotives were electric only, with the technology demonstrator and test platform being built in 2002 in Belfort France by Alstom. Next came the Prima 6000 technology demonstrator; this too was an electric locomotive, with 6000 kW of power and primarily intended to test and demonstrate multi-voltage operations for European cross-border operations.

A series of diesel locomotives also associated with the Prima name were also built. These were the General Motors (GM)-engined machines built by Alstom at its Spanish plant in Valencia, and Ruston-engined locomotives built in Belfort, France.

The Valencia plant was sold to Vossloh in 2004. Locomotives continued to be built there using EMD engines and electrical transmission systems – including almost total rebuilds of the RENFE 333 class. Vossloh changed the names of the products produced there to the "Vossloh Euro" platform (see Vossloh Euro locomotives) and the end came of the association of the Valencia plant with the Prima name.

Also produced in the 1990s were Prima diesels countries outside Europe. The DE32C was produced for Syrian Railways, and Sri Lanka received 10 locomotives which it designated M9 class. A DE43C model was exported to Iran (AD43C). Nevertheless, the Euro 3000 and Euro 4000 products produced at Vossloh España continue to show similarities with the earlier Prima products—such as the centrally located driver position with radially located controls, the single drivers window, and general body shape and design of the rigid body shell.

Alstom and Siemens collaborated to produce the BB 75000 diesel, which has received orders for at least 400 locomotives from SNCF with a possibility of 100 more. A Siemens/Alstom BB 75000 mock-up was unveiled on 25 March 2004, The first locomotive was produced in 2006.

In 2008 Alstom unveiled the 'Prima II' platform; diesel versions are to be offered, so it is expected that further models of the Prima diesel locomotive family will appear.

== Technology ==
The Prima type locomotives built at Alstom's Valencia plant were engined with General motors engines; in fact the entire power train – engine, generator, electronics and motors were supplied by General Motors for the Valencia built Primas. For the locomotives built in France – primarily those exported outside Europe Ruston engines were used. The Prima diesels for SNCF Fret used MTU engines.

Modern innovations in the Prima class included – a centrally located drivers seat with ergonomically arranged controls, a monocoque rigid bodyshell.

The BB 75000 retains the Prima appearance – the single window, drivers position, body design, but the 'innards' are supplied by Siemens, the engine from Caterpillar.

== Variants ==
Type	Operator (name)	Engine	UIC wheels	v km/h	Number built	Build date	Notes
JT 42BW	Israel Railways	EMD 710 V12	Bo'Bo'	140	48	1996-2006	Primarily passenger use
JT 42CW	Israel Railways	EMD 710 V12	Co'Co'	110	8	1996	Primarily freight use
AD 32C	Sri Lanka Railways (M9)	Ruston RK 215 V12	Co'Co'	110	10	1997-2000	1676mm gauge. Engine de-rated from 3220 hp to 1800 hp
DE 32 C AC	Syrian Railways (LDE3200)	Ruston RK 215 V12	Co'Co'	120	30	1999	Built for Syrian Railways, 2,160 kW (2,900 hp) of power at wheel. Also referred to as AD 33.
JT 42HW-HS	EWS (Class 67)	EMD 710 V12	Bo'Bo'	200	30	1999-2000	Mixed use
DE 43 C AC	Iranian Railways (AD43C)	Ruston RK 215 V16	Co'Co'	110	100	2000-2009	A passenger version is specified with a 150 km/h top speed. First 20 units built by Alstom, remainder by Wagon Pars, Iran
PL42AC	NJT	EMD 710 V16	Bo'Bo'	160	33	2003-2006	Single ended machines for passenger use
Class 333.3	RENFE	EMD 645 V16	Co'Co	120	92	2000-2005	1668mm gauge. Rebuilt from 1970s Macosa built, NOHAB design, EMD engined RENFE 333 – only EMD 645 engine plus generator retained
Class 333.4	RENFE	EMD 645 V16	Co'Co	160	8	2003-	1668mm gauge. Rebuilt from RENFE 333.3 subclass for higher speed use on passenger services
DE30BAC	SNCF (BB 75000)	MTU 4000 R41 16V	Bo'Bo'	120	400	2006-2015	Collaboration between Alstom and Siemens (approx. 60:40 split). Based on design elements of SNCF BB 27000 'Prima' (bodyshell) and 2016 'Eurorunner' (traction equipment). Engine is from MTU as per Rh 2016
Sources – see individual articles (linked first column), except where noted

=== RENFE 334 ===
These were the last of the Valencia-built Prima locomotives and technically should be considered part of the Vossloh Euro series of locomotives since they came off the production line after 2004. Built for passenger work on non-electrified lines in Spain, and were intended to replace older Class 333s.
