= Siemens Viaggio Light =

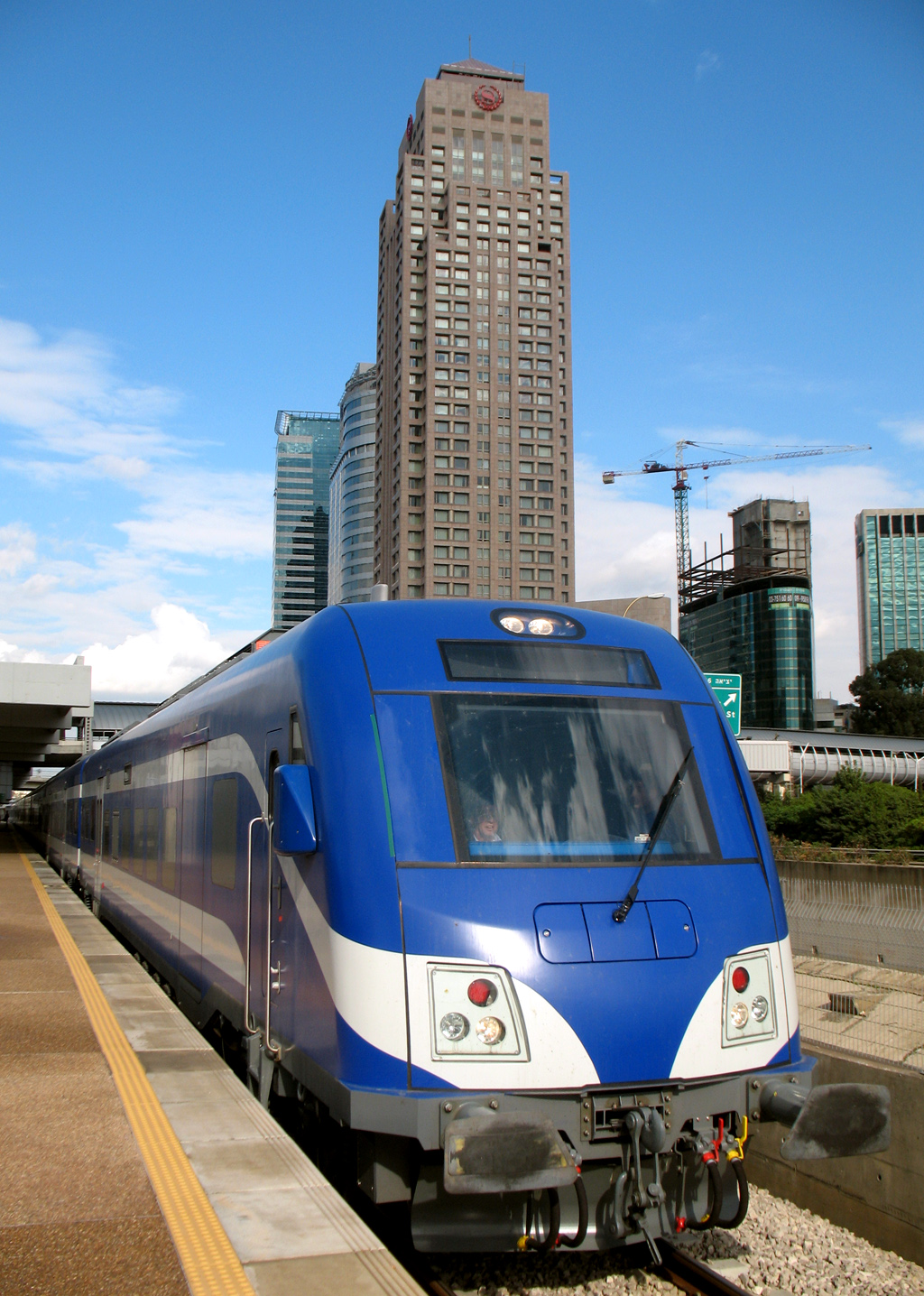
Viaggio Light in the Tel Aviv Central station

Siemens Viaggio Light is a standard gauge single-deck passenger train made by Siemens, initially as the diesel ISR SDPP (single deck push-pull) trainset for Israel Railways. The first order included 87 cars, with an option for a total of 585 cars. The cars arrived in Israel during 2008 and are gradually entering service in 2009. They were coloured blue and white after the scheme won in a public poll published by Israel Railways.

There have been a number of controversies surrounding the trains. After their delivery had been delayed by the manufacturer, problems were discovered in them and they were taken out of service in May 2009 but have since been gradually put back into service.

== Israel ==
=== Conception and delivery ===
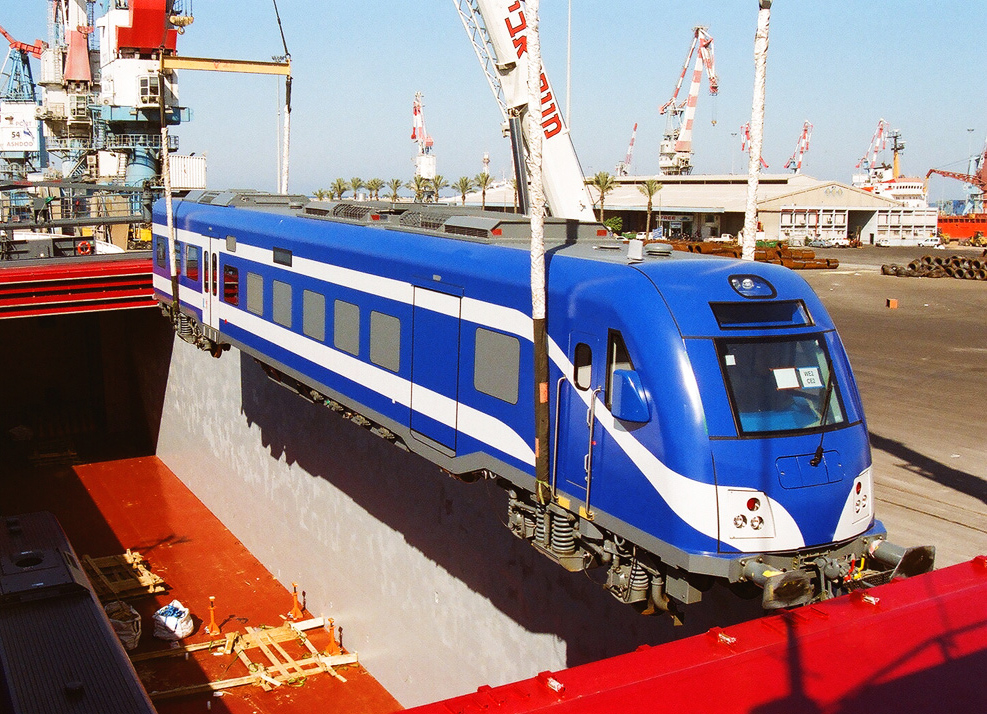
Delivery at the Port of Ashdod

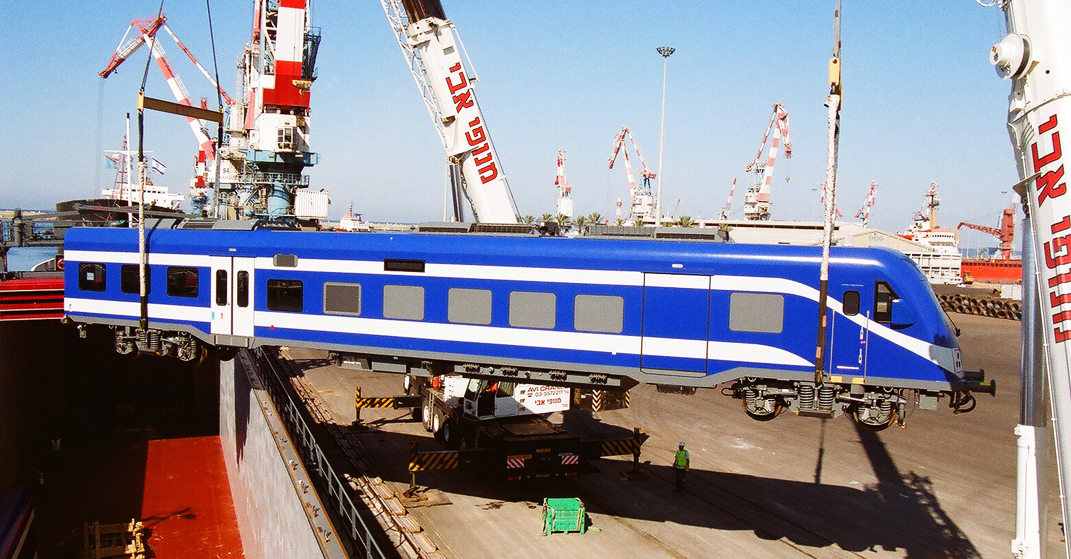

Siemens was chosen by Israel Railways to provide 87 cars for NIS 700 million, with an option for a total of 585 cars for NIS 4 billion, following an international tender in which Alstom and Bombardier also participated. The winner was chosen in January 2006 and the contract was signed in March 2006. The trains were constructed by Siemens in their factories in Prague, Maribor, and a temporary one built in Israel. The bogies were tested in Graz, Austria, and the cars in Switzerland by a company called PROSE, and delivered to Israel between 18 June, 2008, and July 2009, after three delays.

The color scheme was subject to a public poll, published by Israel Railways in newspapers and the Internet, which gave a choice of four designs: Blue and red with white stripes, blue, red with white stripes, and blue with white stripes. The blue and white design won with 34.9% of a total of 62,871 people who participated in the survey. 58,871 votes came from Internet users (at least 547 of whom were not from Israel), and an additional 4,000 rail travelers were polled by Israel Railways staff. There was no significant difference between the results of the two groups.

In early 2010, due to an anticipated equipment shortage because of the opening of new rail lines, Israel Railways exercised its option to purchase additional units, ordering 4 control cars and 27 regular cars for the sum of €46 million. They are expected to arrive in the summer of 2011.

=== Technical specifications and features ===
There are three types of cars: a control car with a power generator, a regular passenger car, and a handicap-accessible passenger car with wheelchair equipment, including the Trainlift TR 450 technology. The control car is 25.6 meters long, while the trailer cars are 26.1 m long, although all cars have a length of 26.4 m including buffers. The total train length (10 cars) is 284 m. All cars are 2.8 m wide and 4.35 m high and weigh 56.1 tons (control car), 48.1 tons (regular car) and 47.9 tons (handicap-accessible car). The floor entrance height is 1.03 m. The wheel diameter is 92 centimeters, and the bogie (model SF-300) size is 2.5 m.

The maximum service speed of the train is 160 km/h (100 mph), to be hauled by an Israel Railways Alstom/EMD JT42BW or Vossloh/EMD Euro locomotive and was initially meant to carry 10 passenger cars in total (including the control car and three wheelchair-accessible cars). The cars are connected with standard UIC gear. However, following initial testing in Israel, Israel Railways decided that only 8 or 9 cars would make up each train. The cars are connected by standard couplings as well as cables for power transmission.

The cars are a monocoque design. The floor is 1,030 mm high, and 1,250 mm over the bogie sections. The control car is capable of seating 27 passengers (23 fixed seats at 1,850 seat pitch), while the trailer cars can seat 82 each (78 fixed and 4 folding seats, 1,080 mm pitch). The doors are 1,200 mm wide and 1,900 mm in height. They close either manually or after a set time after no movement is detected by electronic sensors.

=== Controversies ===
In February 2009, Ynet reported serious problems with the Viaggio Light model, including a longer stopping distance when traveling north, narrow doors and corridors, and problems with the Trainlift TR 450 technology. Israel Railways said that the allegations were exaggerated. These and other problems caused Israel Railways to take Viaggio Light out of service in May 2009, until the issues were sorted out.
