= South African Class Afro 4000 =

Type of diesel-electric locomotive

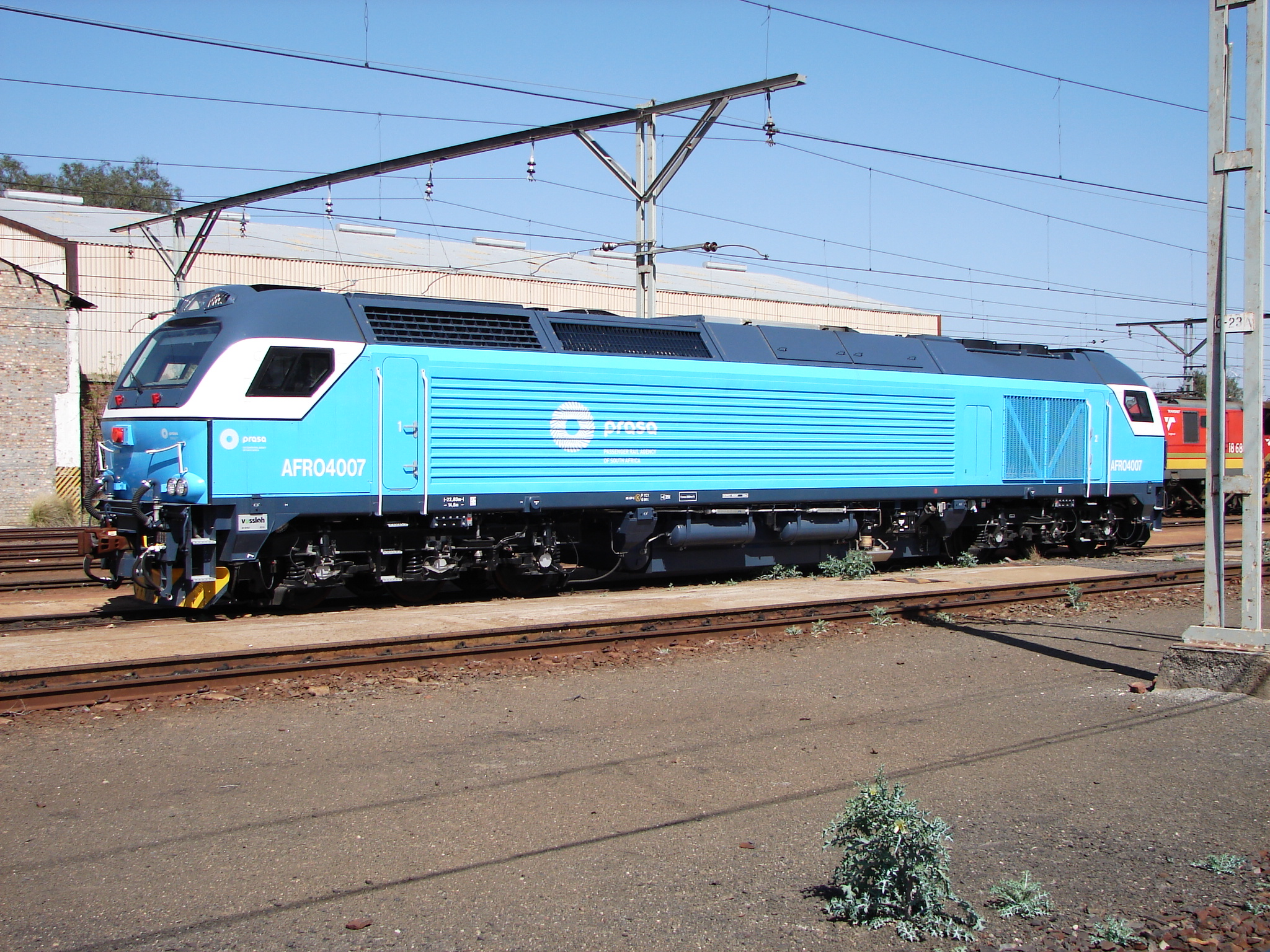
- No. 4007 at Beaufort West, 15 September 2015
Type and origin
- Power type: Diesel-electric
- Designer: Vossloh España
- Builder: Vossloh España
- Serial number: 2781-2800
- Model: Afro 4000
- Build date: 2014-2015
- Total produced: 20
Specifications
- Configuration
  - AAR: C-C
  - UIC: Co'Co'
  - Commonwealth: Co-Co
- Gauge: 3 ft 6 in (1,067 mm) Cape gauge
- Wheel diameter: 1,067 mm (42.01 in) new 991 mm (39.02 in) worn
- Minimum curve: 90 m (295.28 ft)
- Wheelbase
  - Bogie: 3,600 mm (11 ft 9 3/4 in)
- Pivot centres: 14,600 mm (47 ft 10 3/4 in)
- Length
  - Over couplers: 23,020 mm (75 ft 6 1/4 in)
  - Over beams: 22,800 mm (74 ft 9 5/8 in)
- Width: 2,850 mm (9 ft 4 1/4 in)
- Height: 4,140 mm (13 ft 7 in)
- Axle load: 20.5 t (20.2 long tons; 22.6 short tons) ± 2%
- Loco weight: 123 t (121 long tons; 136 short tons) ± 3%
- Fuel type: Diesel
- Fuel capacity: 6,693 litres (1,472 imp gal; 1,768 US gal)
- Lubricant cap.: 1,300 litres (290 imp gal; 340 US gal)
- Coolant cap.: 1,500 litres (330 imp gal; 400 US gal)
- Sandbox cap.: 480 litres (110 imp gal) in 8 sandboxes
- Power supply: Marathon 64V/L2V-420Ah battery
- Prime mover: GM-EMD 16-710G3B-T2
- RPM range: 200-904
  - RPM low idle: 200
  - Maximum RPM: 904
- Engine type: 2-stroke diesel
- Alternator: CA6 3 phase ACV 10 pole 215 V between phases at 904 rpm 120 Hz at 900 rpm
- Generator: Main: AR20 V DC; Max output current 8100 A Max output voltage 1465 V DC; Auxiliary: Brushless type Output 74 V DC; Continuous power 25 kW (34 hp)
- Traction motors: Six type D43-TR DC
  - Continuous: 950A
- Cylinders: 16 V (45°)
- Cylinder size: 230.2 by 279 mm (9.06 by 10.98 in)
- Gear ratio: 67:18
- Loco brake: Electro-pneumatic, Dynamic
- Air tank cap.: 800 litres (180 imp gal; 210 US gal)
- Compressor: Knorr-Bremse - Max effort 91 kilonewtons (20,000 lb_{f})
- Exhauster: Gardner Denver WLSA9F - 117 cu ft/min (3.3 m^{3}/min) ICFM @ 1050 rpm & 140 psi (9.7 bar; 970 kPa)
- Safety systems: Overspeed: Traction power cutout at 132 km/h (82 mph), emergency brake application at 136 km/h (85 mph)
- Couplers: AAR knuckle
Performance figures
- Maximum speed: 130 km/h (81 mph)
- Power output: 3,178 kW (4,262 hp)
- Brakeforce: 1,500 kW (2,000 hp)
- Dynamic brake peak effort: 141 kilonewtons (32,000 lb_{f}) @ 41 km/h (25 mph); 50 kilonewtons (11,000 lb_{f}) @ 120 km/h (75 mph)
Career
- Operators: PRASA
- Class: Afro 4000
- Number in class: 20
- Numbers: 4001-4020
- Delivered: 2014-2015
- First run: 2014

The Passenger Rail Agency of South Africa Class Afro 4000 of 2014 is a South African diesel-electric locomotive.

In late November 2014, the first of an intended twenty new Class Afro 4000 diesel-electric locomotives for the Passenger Rail Agency of South Africa (PRASA) came ashore in Table Bay Harbour. The locomotive, the first new engine to be acquired by PRASA since its establishment, was officially unveiled at Cape Town Station on 1 December 2014.

== Manufacturers ==
The South African Class Afro 4000 is a 3 ft 6 in (1,067 mm) Cape gauge version of the Euro 4000 which has been built since 2007 by Vossloh Rail Vehicles of Albuixech, Valencia for European 1,435 mm (4 ft 8 1/2 in) standard gauge and 1,668 mm (5 ft 5 21/32 in) Iberian gauge railways. A number is also in use by Israel Railways.

== Swifambo Rail Leasing ==
The intended twenty Afro 4000 diesel-electric locomotives, to be followed by fifty Vossloh-built AfroDual electro-diesel locomotives, were acquired by Swifambo Rail Leasing, a Black Economic Empowerment rolling stock company, and would be operated by PRASA on lease.

== Features ==
The locomotive has a Co-Co axle configuration, two-cab design, DC main and auxiliary generators and an AC auxiliary alternator, with six DC traction motors. While the majority of South African mainline electric locomotives to date have been dual-cab units, the two-cab design is a new feature on South African mainline diesel-electric locomotives. It allows travel in both directions without the requirement for turning facilities at terminals.

As a result of the narrow Cape Gauge, there was insufficient space on the axles to accommodate disk brakes. The locomotive is therefore equipped with the older design tread brakes. In addition, the locomotive's brake system was modified so that the driver can isolate the locomotive brakes from the train brakes in situations where it is not necessary to activate the whole train's brakes.

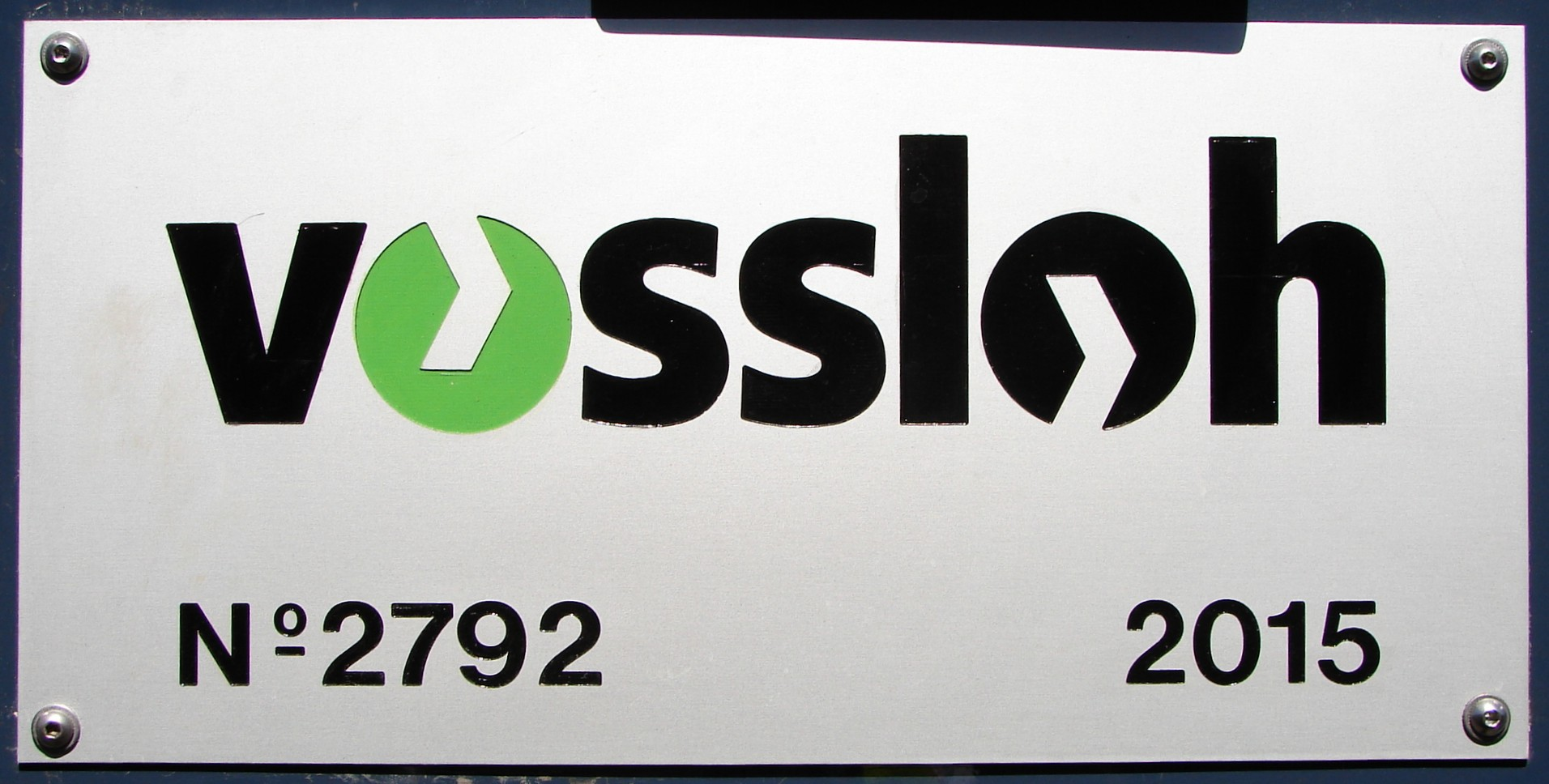
Works plate on no. 4012

The locomotive is equipped with a state-of-the-art communications system and Global Positioning System (GPS) to permit the railway to keep track of each train at all times. A Groupe Spécial Mobile (Global System for Mobile Communications or GSM) data transmission system ensures that any maintenance and repair work required is immediately relayed to the maintenance depots, thereby minimising downtime. Minimum maintenance and repair costs are made possible by a modular design which permits easy assembly, disassembly and complete module replacements with easy access to components.

The locomotive provides optimum driving conditions with a spacious cab which offers the driver unobstructed external vision. The cab is separately air-conditioned to assure agreeable conditions for the driver and features fire-protection. The windscreen is shock-resistant to further enhance the driver's safety and also ensures minimum noise levels in the cab. An integrated crash system ensures that both the driver and the locomotive are protected in the event of a collision.

Like many contemporary European locomotives which only require one crew member driving from a central position, the Afro 4000 was originally designed with only one centrally positioned seat. As a result of trade union pressure, another seat had to be added at a late stage which resulted in a cab design which has both seats occupying not much more than half of the cab area.

== Service ==
The Class Afro 4000 was the first new locomotive type to be acquired for PRASA since its establishment on 23 December 2008. It was officially unveiled at Cape Town Station on 1 December 2014. To date PRASA had been using electric and diesel-electric locomotives which had first entered service in the 1970s during the South African Railways era, and a number of Class 18E electric locomotives which had been rebuilt from older Class 6E1 units. Following testing, the first of the new locomotives entered trial service in April 2015, pending clearance for operational use by the Railway Safety Regulator.

It was intended to employ ten of the Afro 4000 locomotives on commuter runs in the Eastern Cape working out of Port Elizabeth and East London, where PRASA had been dependent on diesel-electric locomotives hired from Transnet Freight Rail. The rest, along with the AfroDual electro-diesel locomotives, would be employed on six Shosholoza Meyl intercity passenger routes throughout the country. The new locomotive fleet was intended to help resurrect PRASA's mainline passenger services which had been steadily declining over several years as a result of poor management and infrastructure theft, which led to late departures and arrivals, trains cancelled without notice, breakdowns which left passengers stranded, poor rolling stock maintenance, lax and indifferent onboard service and torched trains.

PRASA's decline has seen the total volumes carried by Shosholoza Meyl mainline passenger services drop from three million annually in 2009/10 to less than one million in 2014, while the number of trains operated was halved from 6,000 to 3,000 annually. Eight scheduled mainline train routes were discontinued by PRASA in the same week that the first Afro 4000 locomotive was unveiled, while another four mainline train routes were curtailed by discontinuing trains on certain weekdays. Some of these trains were reintroduced in April 2015.

== Loading gauge controversy ==
=== Construction ===
The Euro 4000 locomotive was designed to operate throughout Europe and is 4,264 millimetres (13 feet 11 7/8 inches) high above the railhead. During the tendering and negotiating process, PRASA submitted a loading gauge specification which called for a maximum height of 4,140 millimetres (13 feet 7 inches). Since the latter height was feasible by only modifying the detachable roof structures and some components without affecting the carbody structure or requiring major modifications, Vossloh España proceeded with the locomotive design once the contract was signed.

The Transnet Freight Rail loading gauge specification which had been submitted during the tender phase when only the Euro Dual electro-diesel locomotive was being considered in the scope of the contract, was one which made special allowance for the pantographs on electric locomotives to exceed the actual maximum height of 3,965 millimetres (13 feet 1/8 inch). The loading gauge specification for diesel-electric locomotives and other rail vehicles, specifying a maximum height of 3,965 millimetres (13 feet 1/8 inch) above the railhead, was submitted to the manufacturer in October 2013 after the locomotive design was completed. The two loading gauge versions are identical in respect of roof profile and height, and differ only in respect of the special provision for the pantographs on electric locomotives to exceed the prescribed maximum height.

Since reducing the locomotive height to 3,965 millimetres (13 feet 1/8 inch) would require a complete re-design of the vehicle equipment and the carbody structure and since the Afro 4000 locomotive, as already designed, would fit into the first submitted loading gauge for electric locomotive pantographs, PRASA accepted the locomotive design at the 4,140 millimetres (13 feet 7 inches) height.

=== Height constraint tests ===
In January and February 2014, PRASA conducted height verification at bridges with notable height constraints at Jeppe, Denver, Driehoek and New Era, towing Class 7E2 no. E7201 which is 4,190 millimetres (13 feet 9 inches) high with pantographs down and with a carbody height of 3,942 millimetres (12 feet 11 1/4 inches). Of these locations, the lowest measured height of the contact wire above the railhead was 4,150 millimetres (13 feet 7 3/8 inches) at Denver. The pantographs in the housed (lowered) position began to foul and lift the contact wire approximately 10 metres (32 feet 9 3/4 inches) from the bridges and at Denver and New Era stretched the cross spans.

Similar tests were carried out between Beaufort West and Cape Town towing Class 7E no. E7058, which is 4,200 millimetres (13 feet 9 3/8 inches) high with pantographs down and with a carbody height of 3,942 millimetres (12 feet 11 1/4 inches).

The resulting report concluded that the Afro 4000's loading gauge does not fit in the South African infrastructure clearance envelope. While the PRASA rolling stock, the Class 7E and 7E2 locomotives which were used during the tests, also do not comply with the structure gauge clearance under the bridge, there was no direct contact of the carbody with the overhead contact wire since the pantographs are insulated from the roof. The Afro 4000, however, has a minimum calculated roof clearance of only 10 millimetres (3/8 inch), which poses an operational electrical risk. Since it does not fit the designed earth clearances at bridges and tunnels and the height of the locomotive encroaches too close to the contact wire, the risk to the driver and the locomotive is high. One of the recommendations was that delivery of the Afro 4000 should be delayed, pending a suggested design review.

=== Post-delivery testing ===
In spite of the recommendations, the first locomotive was delivered in November 2014. On 13 July 2015, with thirteen locomotives already delivered and following a press report about the excessive height of the Afro 4000 locomotive, PRASA Chief Executive Officer Lucky Montana denied that the locomotive's height was excessive and insisted that PRASA had followed a strict design review process. Two days later, on 15 July, Montana was dismissed, followed on 17 July by the suspension of chief engineer and "designer" of the locomotive "Doctor" Daniel Mthimkhulu on account of his fictitious academic qualifications.

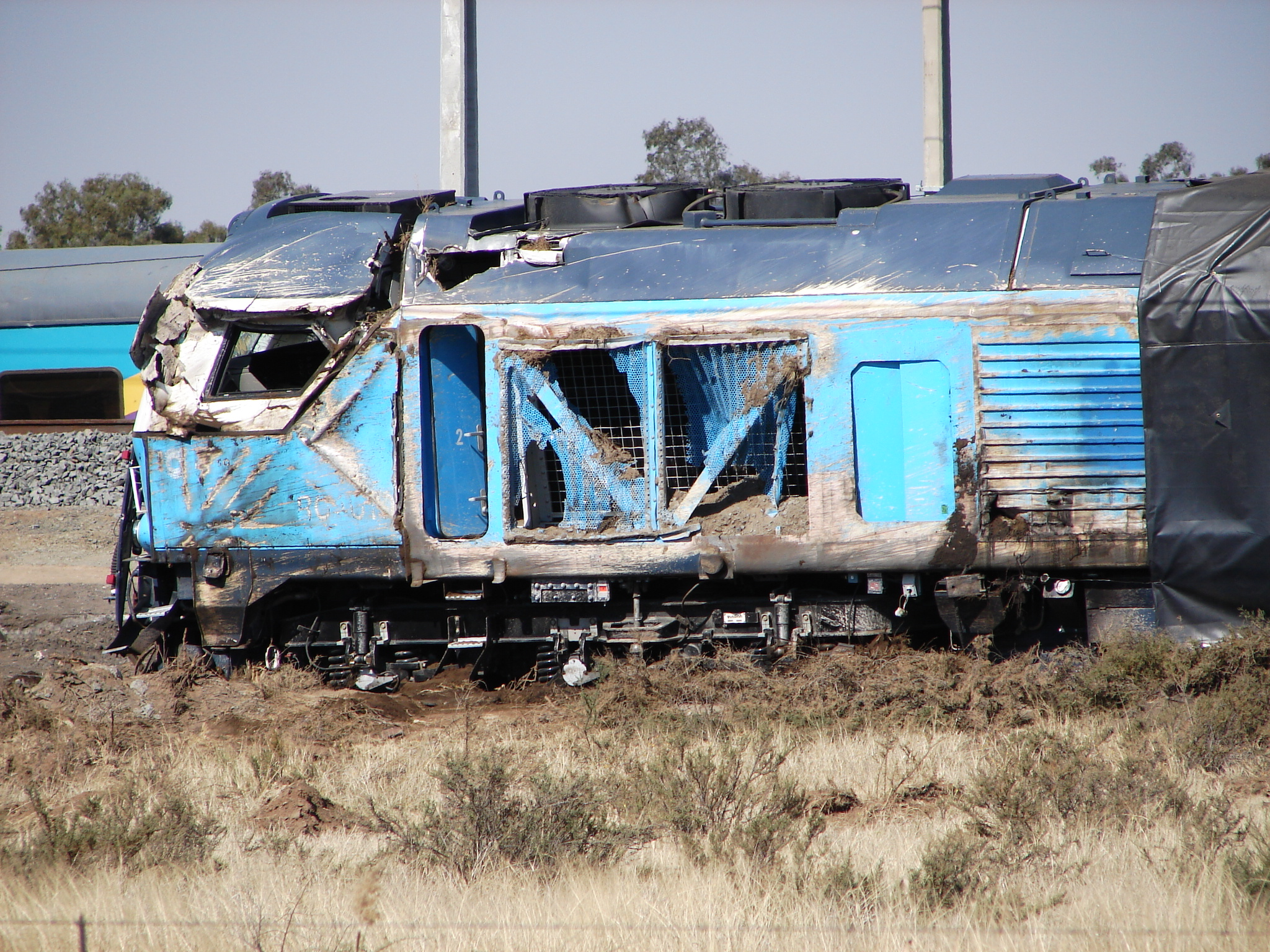
No. 4010, derailed at Modderrivier on 19 August 2015

On 19 August 2015, during the locomotive's trial period pending clearance for operational use by the Railway Safety Regulator, one of the locomotives was involved in a passenger train derailment at Modderrivier south of Kimberley. The integrated crash system was severely put to the test during the derailment, since the locomotive struck a catenary mast while toppling over and suffered extreme damage to the cab which resulted in serious injury to the driver's assistant.

=== Contract collusion ===
With only thirteen of the twenty locomotives delivered, PRASA chairman Popo Molefe approached the High Court in Johannesburg in November 2015 in an attempt to have the R4,800,000,000 locomotive contract with Vossloh España cancelled on the grounds of blatant collusion during the tender process. In an affidavit, Molefe laid out details of how the tender was allegedly rigged and specifically designed to favour Swifambo Rail Leasing, a front company owned by Black Economic Empowerment beneficiary Auswell Mashaba which was allegedly formed specifically for the "joint venture" transaction with Vossloh España.

On 2 July 2017 the High Court in Johannesburg struck down the contract, finding that the tender was rigged to favour Swifambo Rail Leasing who used its Broad-Based Black Economic Empowerment rating to front for the Spanish manufacturer. With R2,600,000,000 already paid by Prasa to Swifambo for only thirteen unusable locomotives delivered, the process to recoup the money has yet to begin.

== Works numbers ==
The locomotive unit numbers, works numbers and years of construction are listed in the table.

Class Afro 4000
Loco no.	Works no.	Year
4001	2781	2014
4002	2782	2014
4003	2783	2014
4004	2784	2015
4005	2785	2015
4006	2786	2015
4007	2787	2015
4008	2788	2015
4009	2789	2015
4010	2790	2015 (Wrecked 2015)
4011	2791	2015
4012	2792	2015
4013	2793	2015
4014	2794	2015 (Never delivered)
4015	2795	2015 (Never delivered)
4016	2796	2015 (Never delivered)
4017	2797	2015 (Never delivered)
4018	2798	2015 (Never delivered)
4019	2799	2015 (Never delivered)
4020	2800	2015 (Never delivered)

== Livery ==
The Class Afro 4000 locomotives were delivered in the Passenger Rail Agency of South Africa's blue livery.

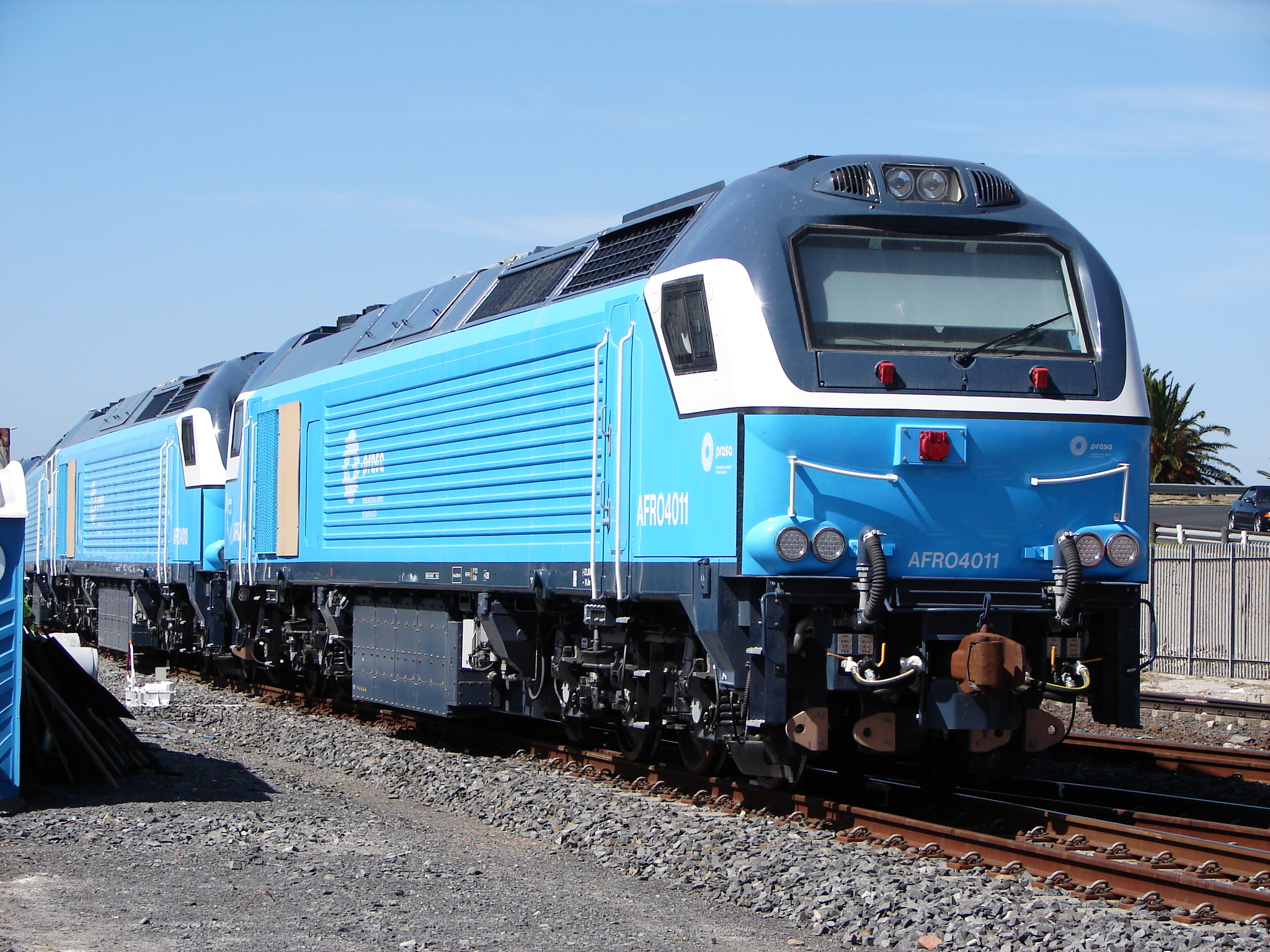
No. 4011, right side, Table Bay Yard, 2 April 2015

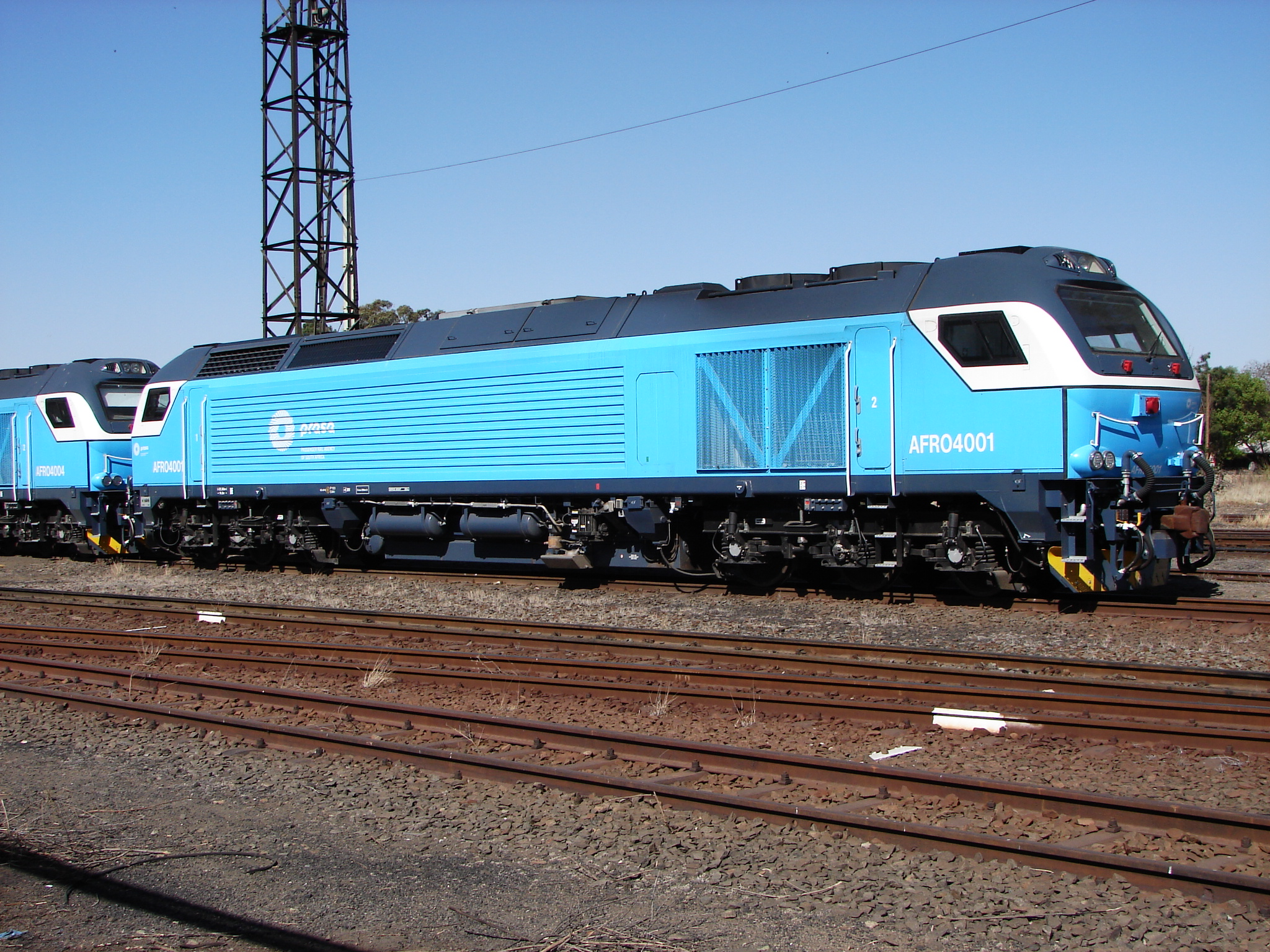
No. 4001, left side, Bloemfontein, 18 September 2015

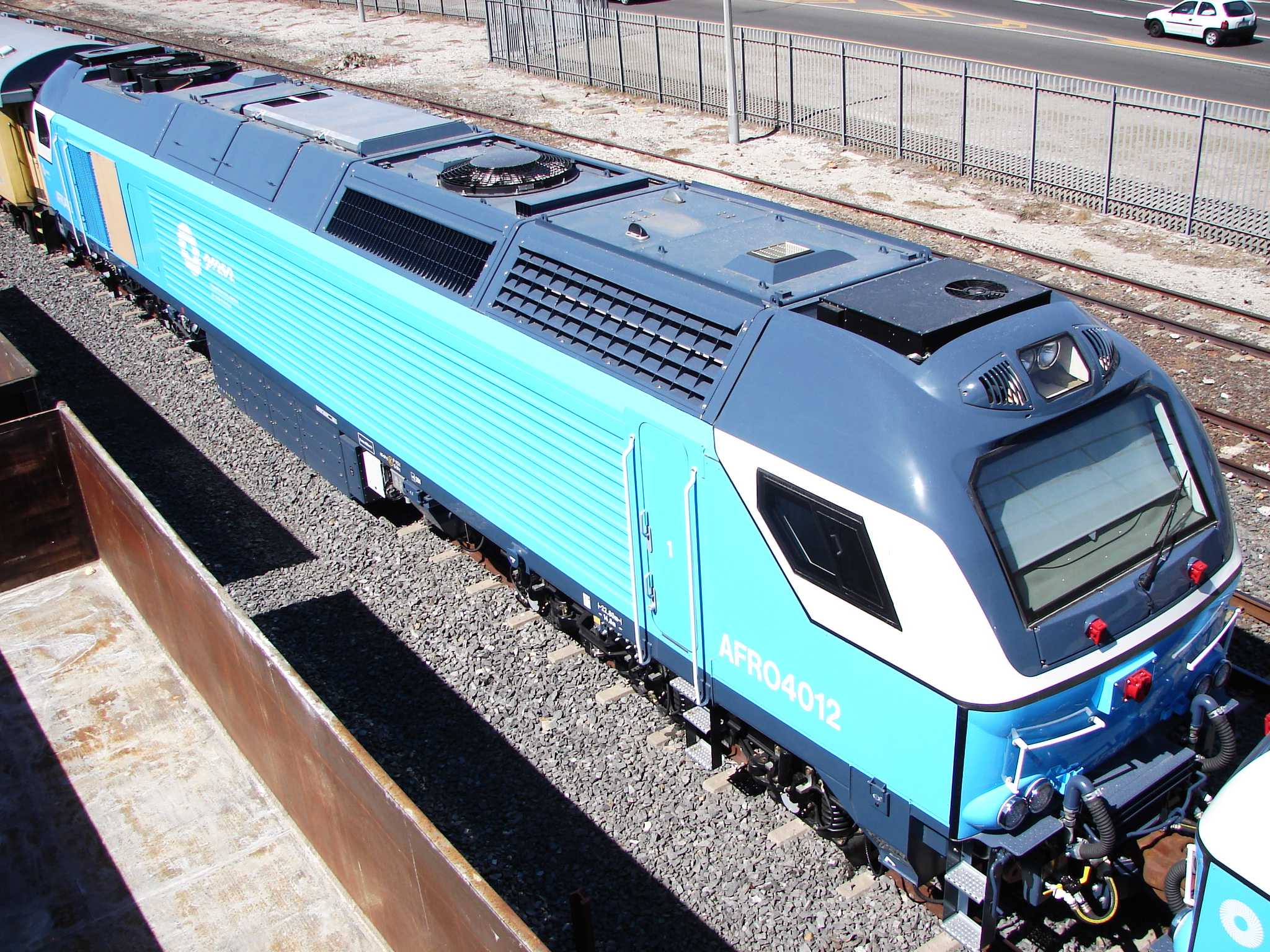
No. 4012, no. 1 end, Table Bay Yard, 2 April 2015

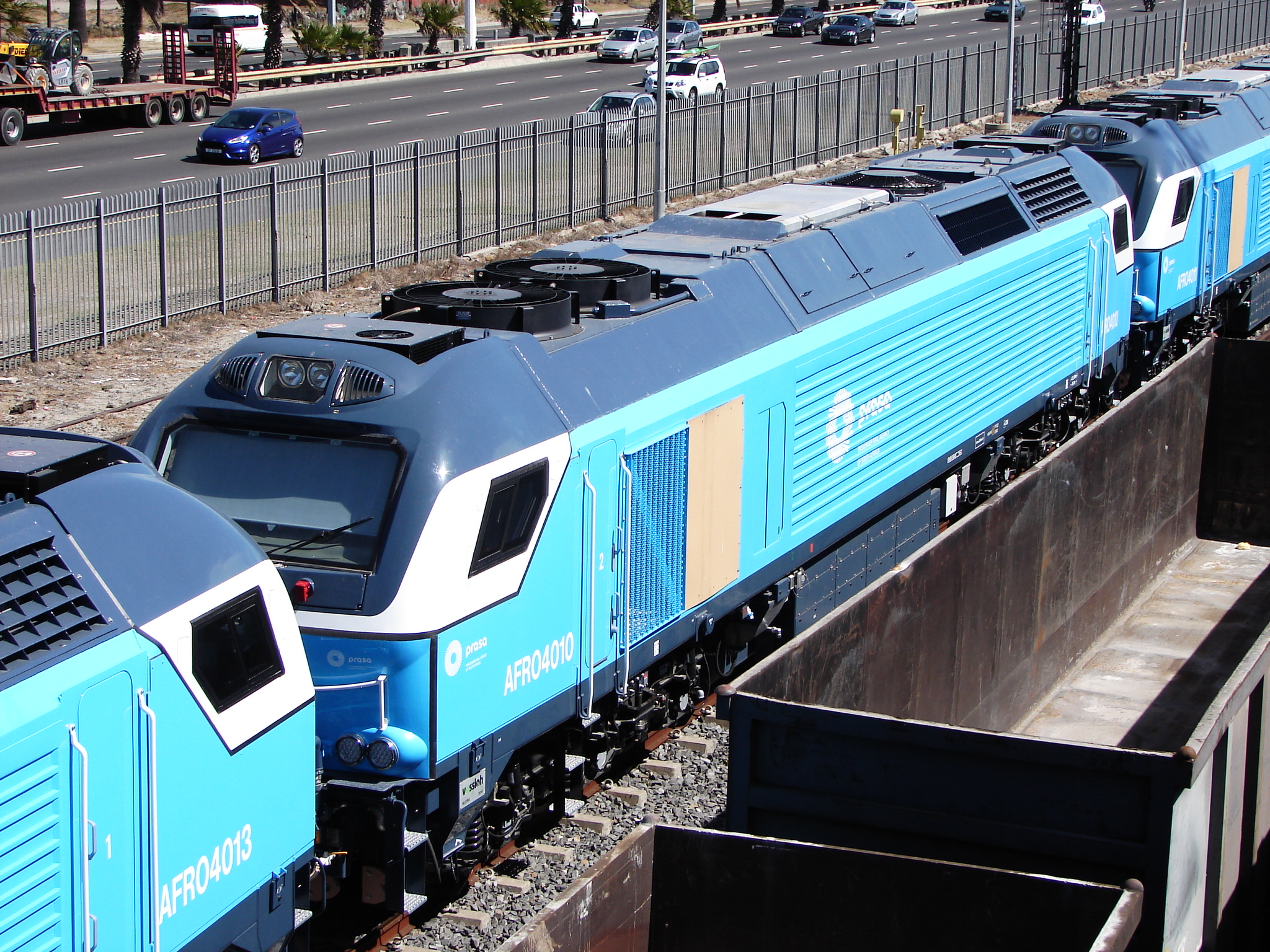
No. 4010, no. 2 end, Table Bay Yard, 2 April 2015
