= Class 333 =

Class 333 may refer to:

- British Rail Class 333, electric multiple unit train built by CAF between 2000 and 2003
- Renfe Class 333, diesel-electric locomotive built in the 1970s
