= Renfe Class 334 =

Spanish diesel locomotive class

Renfe 334/Vossloh Euro 3000
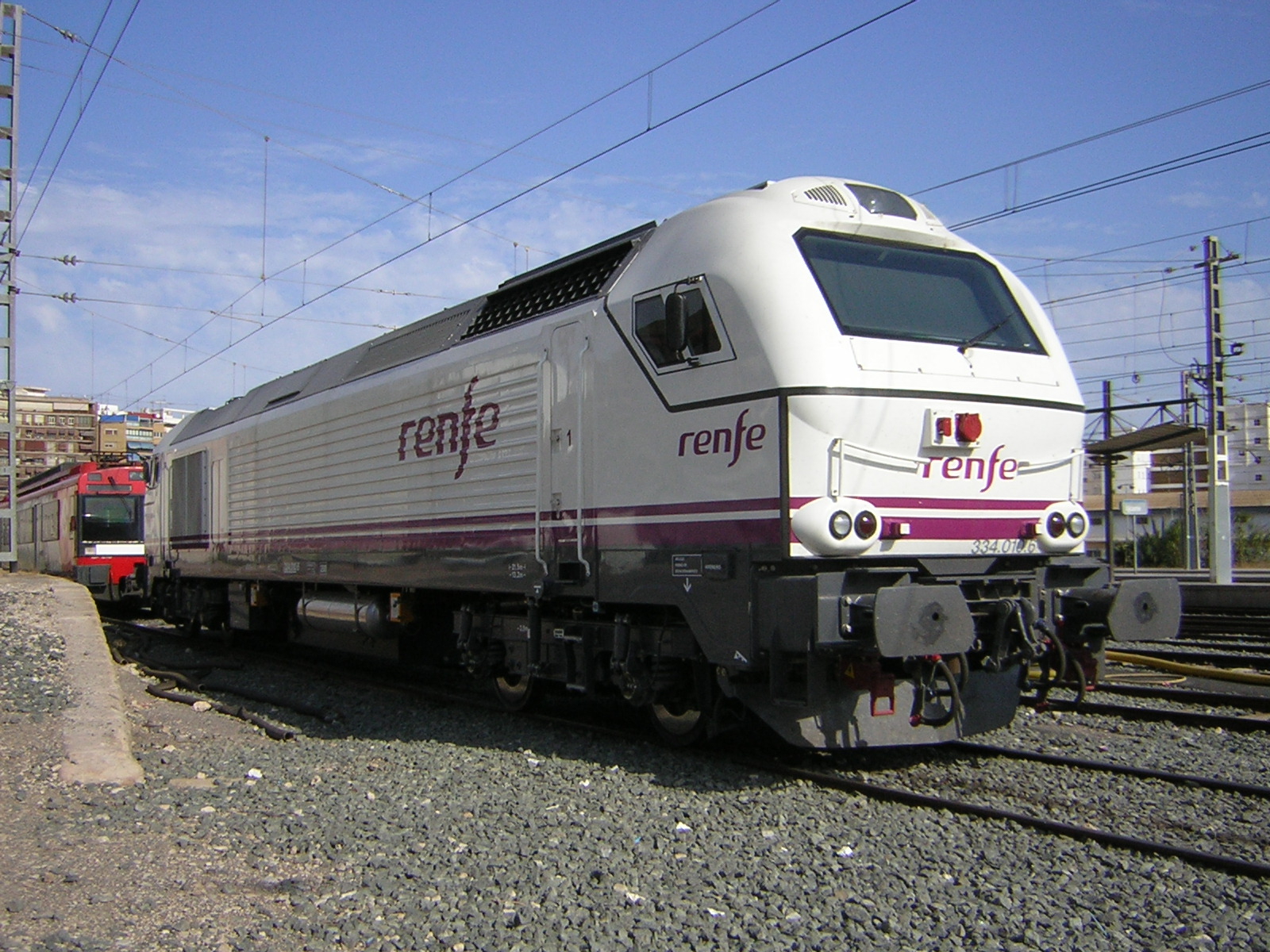
Type and origin
- Power type: Diesel-electric
- Designer: Renfe / Alstom
- Builder: Vossloh España / EMD
- Build date: (ordered 2004); Delivered 2006-2008
- Total produced: 28
Specifications
- Configuration
  - UIC: Bo′Bo′
- Gauge: 1,668 mm (5 ft 5 21/32 in) Iberian gauge
- Axle load: 20 tons
- Loco weight: 80 tons
- Fuel capacity: 4,000 L (880 imp gal; 1,100 US gal)
- Prime mover: 12N-710G3B-EC, 3,300 hp (2,500 kW) (UIC) @ 930rpm
- Engine type: Two-stroke Diesel engine
- Alternator: AR10 + D14 + HE5 (Aux. rated 25kW)
- Traction motors: Four parallel connected D43 FM
- Cylinders: V12
- Transmission: Electric
- MU working: yes
- Loco brake: Electropneumatic
Performance figures
- Maximum speed: 200 km/h (125 mph)
- Tractive effort: continuous: 92 kN (21,000 lb_{f}) at 75 km/h (47 mph) starting: 178 kN (40,000 lb_{f})
Career
- Operators: Renfe
- Nicknames: Caracoles, Caracoles de carreras (Snails, Racing snails)
- Locale: Spain
- Sources: except where noted

The Renfe 334 is a high speed, 4 axle diesel-electric locomotive built to haul passenger trains on Renfe's Talgo service on non electrified lines.

== Background ==
With the well known Renfe Class 333 locomotives having served for over 30 years the Spanish rail operator faced decisions as to their future. Different options for action were available - rebuild/repair/upgrade the locomotives or replace them with new models; at the time the company was undergoing a major modernisation project - with about 6 billion Euros being invested in rolling stock as part of a 120 billion Euro transport plan.

In the event, acting pragmatically, Renfe chose to do both. The 333 series were extensively rebuilt forming the 333.3 and 333.4 subclasses, and 28 new locomotives were ordered - these were the new build Class 334. A few components were used from old Class 333s, so technically the Class could be considered a rebuild, but the amount of material reused was small so a new class was created.

== Technical details and manufacture ==
Renfe worked with Alstom, who then owned the locomotive manufacturing plant in Valencia, to come up with a design for the new locomotives; Alstom Valencia already had produced diesel powered passenger locomotives for the UK and Israel as well as modernising the Renfe class 333.

The design was similar to the modernised 333s but with a General Motors EMD 710 engine instead of the EMD 645 used in the Class 333.4. Additionally 2-axle trucks were used instead of the 3-axle type that were re-used from the original 333 class in the rebuilt 333.4 and 333.3 models.

Curiously the twenty eight Class 334 locomotives inherit the main generator, alternator and heating equipment from Renfe Class 319.3 locomotives - which in turn have inherited the generators and alternators from scrapped Class 333 locomotives. In summary, the engine, electronics and power transmission system are from General Motors, the other components are typical of an Alstom locomotive.

Despite a change of ownership in 2004, with the factory being bought by Vossloh, the production was not affected.

== Operation ==
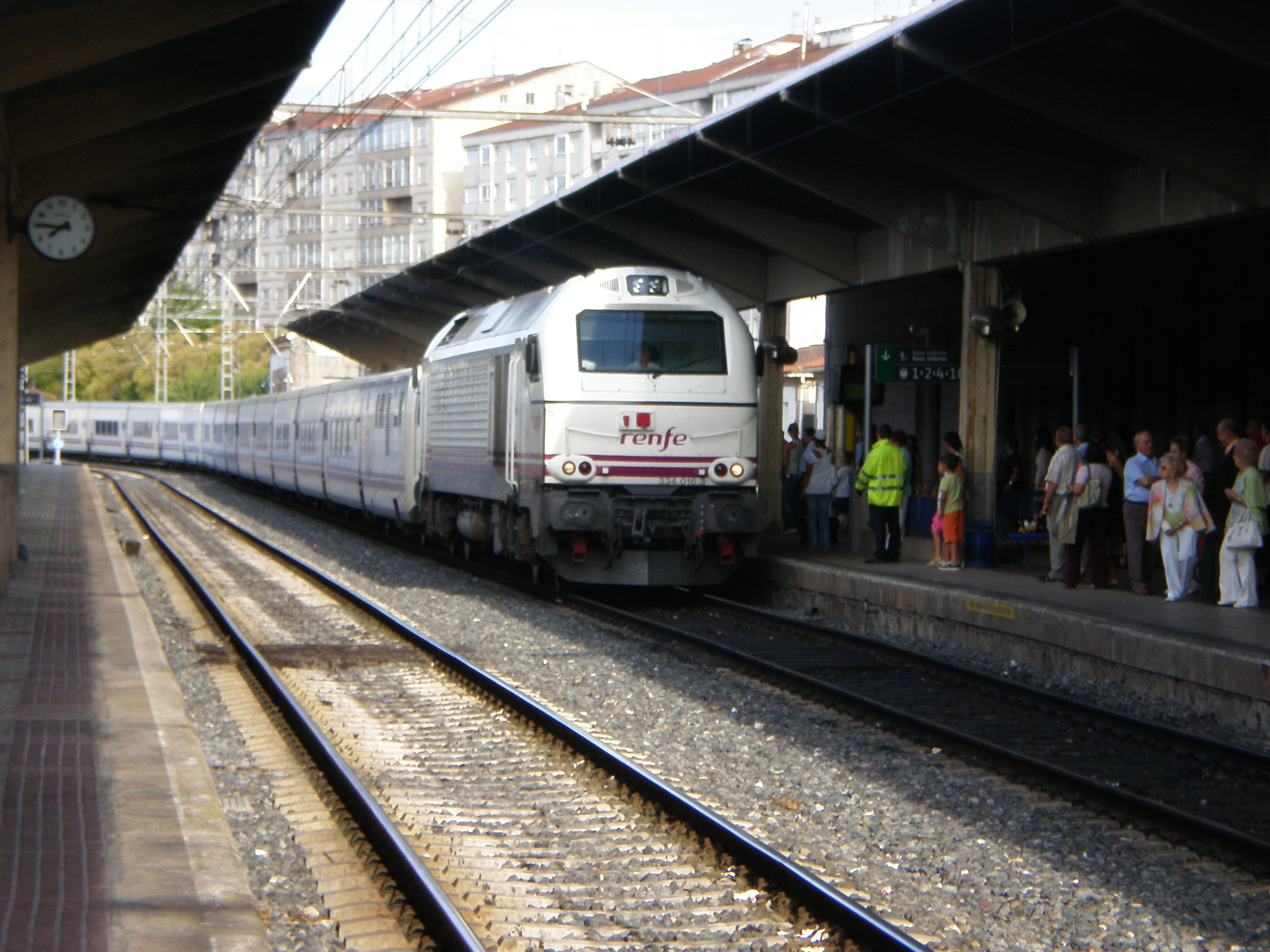
Talgo and 334 locomotive in Ourense railway station.

The Class 334 locomotives were originally intended for operations between Madrid, Murcia and Cartagena.

Six units are used to provide an Altaria service between Madrid and Murcia, the regional capital of the region of Murcia. They are also used on the daily Talgo service from Lorca (Murcia) to Montpellier (France) as far as Barcelona.

Four further units provide a Talgo service between Madrid and Almería. Their use also means that it is not necessary to change engines at the Linares-Baeza station in Baeza.

Additionally since 5 units of the Renfe Class 354 are out of action (two destroyed in a head end collision in Linarejos, three others had accidents in Hellín, Tobarra and Chinchilla and another caught fire) the Class 334 have been used to replace them (being the 354 and the 334 the only diesel locomotives capable of 200 km/h in Spain). However the lower power-to-weight ratio compared to the Class 354 units leads to the typical conclusion of lower technical performance for locomotive hauled trains.

Three locomotives are used to replace the Class 354s destroyed at Linarejos (one used as a reserve) and will operate between A Coruña and Madrid. The replacement service began in March 2007 and ends when the construction of a true high speed line is completed.

== Servicing ==
In 2006 a joint venture between Renfe and Vossloh, Erion, was created, dedicated to servicing and manufacture of rail equipment. Renfe owns 51%, Vossoh 49%. The primary business of the company will be to service the Class 334 locomotives as well as the Renfe Class 333s and Class 335 (Euro 4000). This action has met with criticism from unions as it is part of the process of privatising the Spanish Railways.

== See also ==
- Vossloh Euro locomotives - specifically the Vossloh Euro 3000
- Talgo
