= Stadler Euro =

Diesel-electric locomotive class

Stadler Euro 3000 / 3000 AC / 4000
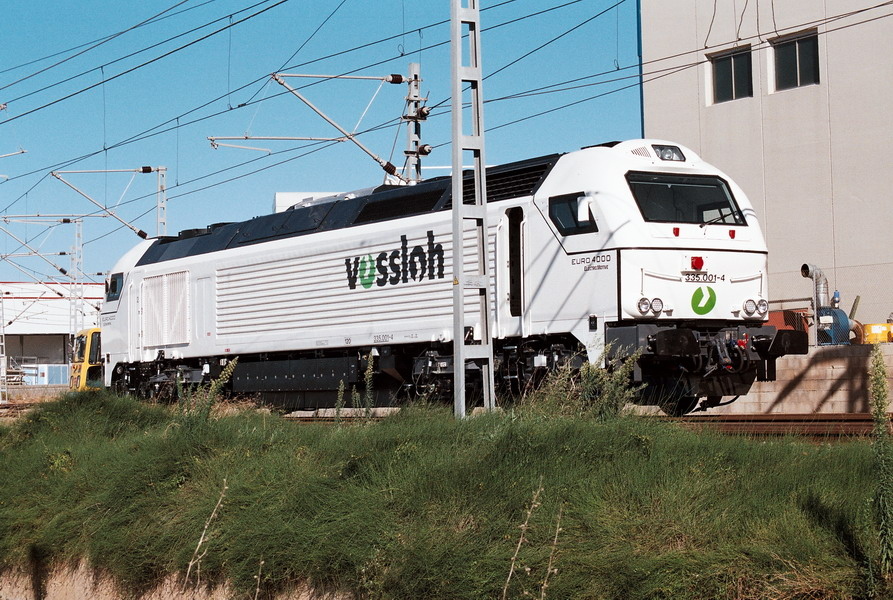
- Euro 4000 numbered 335 001 in Vossloh livery
Type and origin
- Power type: Diesel
- Builder: Vossloh (2006–2015); Stadler Rail Valencia SAU (2016–present)
- Build date: 2006–present
- Total produced: Euro 3000: 28; Euro 4000: 116; Euro 3000 AC: 24
Specifications
- Configuration
  - UIC: 3000 series: Bo′Bo′ 4000 series: Co′Co′
- Gauge: 1,435 mm (4 ft 8 1/2 in) standard gauge or 1,668 mm (5 ft 5 21/32 in) Iberian gauge
- Wheel diameter: 3000 series (freight): 1,015 mm (3 ft 4.0 in); 3000 series (passenger): 965 mm (3 ft 2.0 in); 3000 AC series (passenger): 1,117 mm (3 ft 8.0 in); 4000 series 1,067 mm (3 ft 6.0 in)
- Length: 3000 series: 21.5 m (70 ft 6 in); 3000 AC series: 21 m (68 ft 11 in); 4000 series: 23.02 m (75 ft 6 in)
- Loco weight: 3000 series (freight): 85 tonnes (84 long tons; 94 short tons); 3000 series (passenger): 82 tonnes (81 long tons; 90 short tons); 3000 AC series (passenger): 88 tonnes (87 long tons; 97 short tons); 4000 series (freight): 123 tonnes (121 long tons; 136 short tons); 4000 series (passenger): 126 tonnes (124 long tons; 139 short tons)
- Fuel capacity: 3000 series: 3,000–4,000 L (660–880 imp gal; 793–1,057 US gal); 3000 AC series (passenger): 6,000 L (1,320 imp gal; 1,585 US gal); 4000 series: 7,000 L (1,540 imp gal; 1,849 US gal) (freight); 4000 series: 6,000 L (1,320 imp gal; 1,585 US gal) (passenger)
- Engine type: 3000 Series (freight) EMD 12-710G3C-U2; 3000 Series (passenger) EMD 12-710G3C-U2; 3000 AC Series (passenger) EMD 12-710G3C-U2; 4000 series: EMD 16-710G3C-U2
- Generator: 3000 series AR9 (AR10 optional) (DC); 3000 AC series TA12 (AC); 4000 series (freight) AR20 (DC); 4000 series (passenger) AR11 (DC)
- Traction motors: 3000 series (freight) 4×D43 nose suspended 3000 series (passenger) 4×D43 frame mounted 3000 AC series (passenger) 4×1TB2624FM frame mounted 4000 series 6×D43 nose suspended
- Transmission: 3000 series DC/DC; 3000 AC series AC/AC IGBT; 4000 series DC/DC
- MU working: yes
- Train heating: Yes, 450 kW/1,000 V AC 22-50 Hz (passenger, optional); No (freight)
- Loco brake: Electro-pneumatic, Dynamic; 3000 series: shoe and/or disc 4000 series: disc
- Safety systems: ASFA, PZB, ATC and others
Performance figures
- Maximum speed: 3000 series (freight) 120 km/h (74.6 mph); 3000 series (passenger) 200 km/h (124.3 mph); 3000 AC series (passenger): 160 km/h (99.4 mph); 4000 series (freight) 120 km/h (74.6 mph); 4000 series (freight/passenger) 130 km/h (80.8 mph); 4000 series (passenger) 160 km/h (99.4 mph)
- Power output: 3000 series (passenger): 2,390 kW (3,205 hp); 3000 series (freight) 2,460 kW (3,299 hp); 3000 AC series (passenger): 2,454 kW (3,291 hp); 4000 series: 3,178 kW (4,262 hp)
- Tractive effort: Starting tractive efforts: 3000 series (freight): 280 kN (62,947 lbf); 3000 series (passenger): 178 kN (40,016 lbf); 3000 AC series (passenger): 305 kN (68,567 lbf); 4000 series (freight):400 kN (89,924 lbf); 4000 series (passenger): 325 kN (73,063 lbf)
Career
- Locale: Spain, Norway, Portugal and others
- First run: 2006

The Stadler Euro (known as the Vossloh Euro until 2015) is a class of diesel-electric locomotives built by Stadler Rail for the European market. It is available in two basic variants, the four-axle Euro 3000, (Note: As of 2012 the Euro 3000 DC motor version is unbuilt, except in the 1668mm gauge RENFE 334 equivalent - some of the figures quoted here may be considered speculative.) and the six-axle Euro 4000. These locomotives are powered by EMD 710 prime movers. A six-axle electric-only variant is marketed as Euro 6000; it is also built for the Iberian gauge.

== History and background ==
At the beginning of the 2000s, numerous private train operators emerged in mainland Europe, as open-access freight operation was already granted in some European countries before complete liberalization in 2012. These mainly used second-hand diesel locomotives formerly in use with the state railways of the respective country, or new medium-powered diesel locomotives like the EMD Class 66 or Vossloh G2000. With the success of these operators rising and trains getting heavier, the need of a complete new high-powered diesel locomotive series was becoming high, especially for cross-border freight traffic where absence of, or changes in electrification voltage made electric traction impossible or problematic.

Primarily due to environmental issues and high costs, developments for such a new locomotive series were pushed back whenever possible. In the mid-2000s development of a new series finally seemed economically viable; becoming part of Alstom's Prima locomotive programme. Development of the programme was started under Alstom supervision, but as the Alstom Valencia plant was bought by Vossloh this series got the Vossloh name: Vossloh Euro.

The family can be traced back to the Electro-Motive Diesel engined, Valencia built JT 42BW, JT 42CW and JT 42HW-HS family which were built in various configurations (including 4 and 6 axle variants) for both Israel Railways and English, Welsh and Scottish Railway (as the Class 67); these locomotives used the same GM-EMD engines and traction motors and had similar body shells to the products later built at the Valencia plant under Vossloh's ownership.

In 2004, the Valencia plant left Alstom ownership and was bought by Vossloh; because of this change of ownership, there are many similarities between the Vossloh Euro locomotives, the Alsthom/GM-EMD JT42 locomotives.

After the change of ownership, the next product to roll off the lines at Valencia was the RENFE Class 334 locomotives which are (excluding minor differences) Iberian gauge versions of the later Vossloh Euro locomotives.

== Technology ==
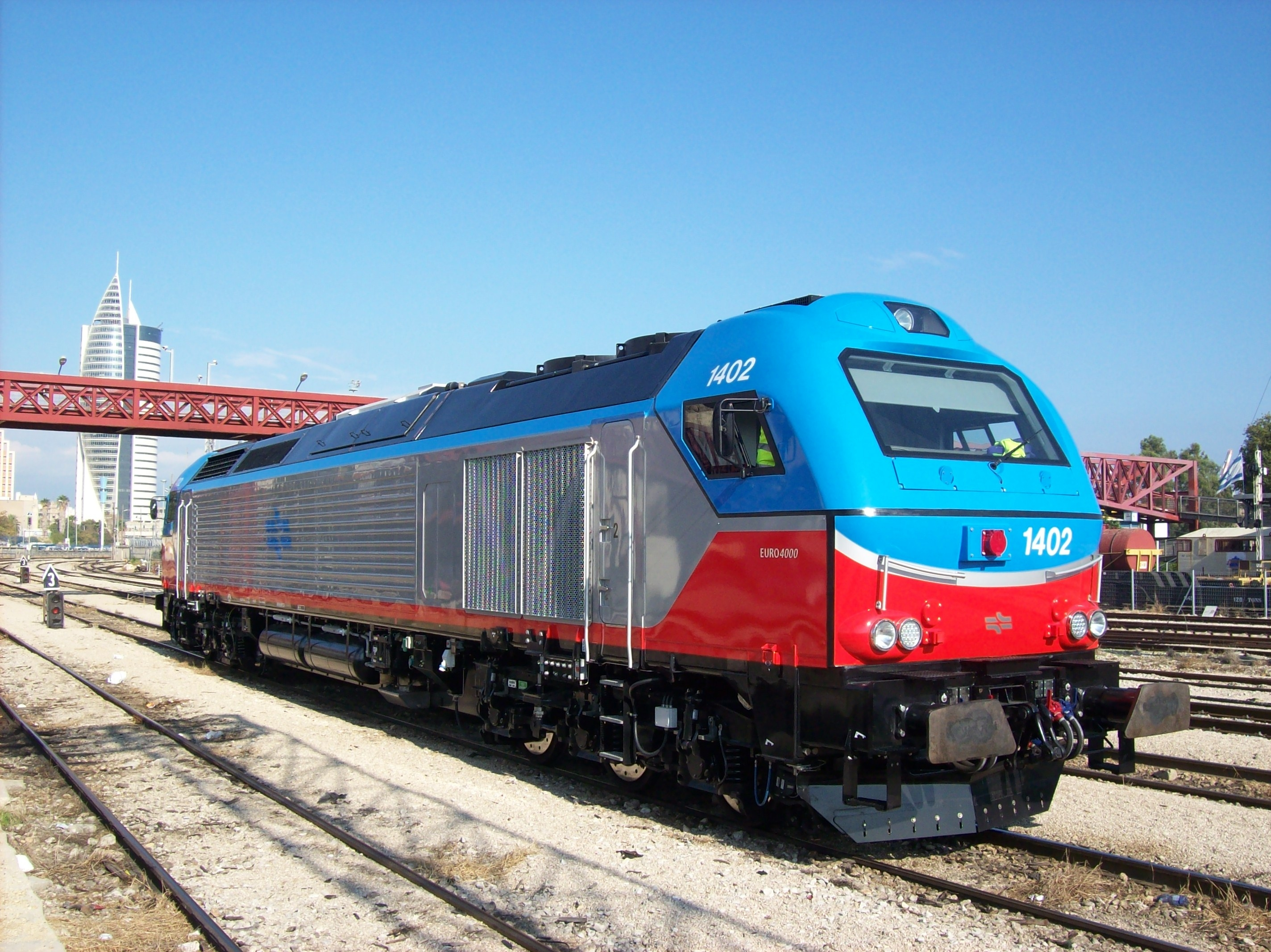
Euro 4000 introduced into Israel Railways service in November 2011

The common factor between this class of locomotives and its predecessors is the General Motors Electro-motive (now Electro-Motive Diesel, since 2010 a subsidiary of Caterpillar) EMD 710 engine and EMD D43 electric motors with associated electronic controls (except for the Euro 3000 AC introduced in 2011, which uses EMD AC electric motors). Thus EMD supplies the entire engine (see also prime mover) and power transmission system for these locomotives including the generator.

The rigid bodyshell show technical similarities with the predecessors (RENFE Class 334 and EWS class 67). The design is modular allowing easy access and change of internal components.

Vossloh suggests that the locomotives could be supplied with alternative engines subject to the customers demands.

The twin cabs have a central driving position with the controls arranged around the drivers seat, the cab is air-conditioned and temperature controlled and designed to minimise noise.

Cold weather variants are available - with additional devices to prevent snow causing problems.

As the locomotives are designed specifically with the European rail network in mind, they can be fitted a variety of different safety systems and are prepared for the ETCS (European Train Control System).

Both versions are available in passenger and freight versions, and also in 1,435 mm (4 ft 8 1/2 in) or 1,668 mm (5 ft 5 21/32 in) gauge.

While there have been several orders for the Euro 4000 model, there have only been two orders for the Euro 3000 model, in 2004 and 2011. The Euro 3000 AC units ordered by Israel Railways in 2011 differ considerably from the earlier Euro 3000 model. Their chassis will resemble that of Vossloh's new Eurolight locomotive, they will utilize a newer and more advanced variant of the EMD710 12-cylinder 3,300 hp engine, will use newer computerized control systems and employ EMD/Siemens AC traction motors (rather than DC engines on the original Euro 3000 model) which will be mounted in a Bo'Bo' bogie of a different design than the earlier Euro 3000 model.

== Career and orders ==
The passenger version Euro 3000 locomotives are essentially the same as RENFE Class 334 ordered prior to the change of ownership of the Valencia plant; they continued production under Vossloh ownership. (The RENFE 334's can be considered members of both the Alstom Prima and Vossloh Euro locomotive families). There have only been two orders for the Euro 3000 model, in 2004 and 2011, with these two Euro 3000 variants differing significantly technically (see 'Technology' section above).

The Euro 4000 demonstrator locomotive was built in 2006 and was exhibited at the InnoTrans 2006 fair. It was then tested on different German main lines before being sold to Angel Trains Cargo.

=== Afro 4000 ===
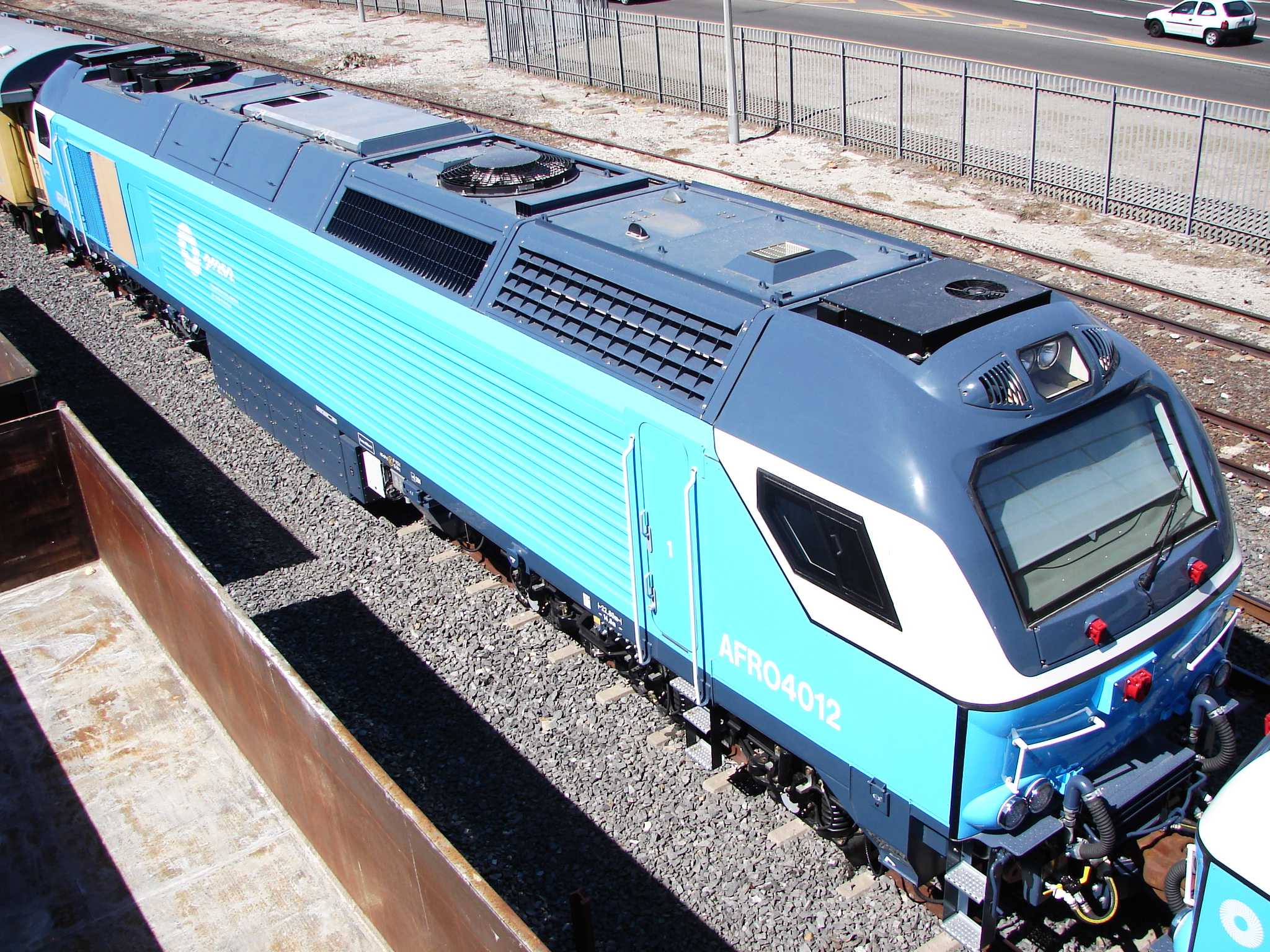
PRASA Class Afro 4000

The South African Class Afro 4000 is a 1,067 mm (3 ft 6 in) version of the Euro 4000. In late November 2014 the first of twenty new Afro 4000 diesel-electric locomotives for the Passenger Rail Agency of South Africa (PRASA) came ashore in Table Bay Harbour. The locomotive, the first new engine to be acquired by PRASA since its establishment, was officially unveiled at Cape Town Station on 1 December 2014.

The twenty Afro 4000 diesel-electric locomotives, to be followed by fifty Vossloh-built AfroDual electro-diesel locomotives, were acquired by Swifambo Rail Leasing, a rolling stock company, and will be operated by PRASA on lease.

In late 2015 Prasa began proceedings at the South African high court to terminate the contract for both the Afro4000 and other dual mode locomotives ordered from Vossloh - specific issues included the supplied diesel locomotives being substantially out of gauge for parts of the network (4.140 m or 13 ft 7 in high versus a 3.695 m or 12 ft 1 1/2 in limit specified by Transnet).

=== Orders ===
Company	Gauge	Type	Number	Date ordered	Comments
RENFE	1,668 mm (5 ft 5 21/32 in)	Euro 3000 passenger (RENFE 334)	28	2004	Ordered before the company was part of Vossloh - the RENFE Class 334 is effectively a 1,668 mm Euro 3000 passenger version.
Comsa	1,668 mm (5 ft 5 21/32 in)	Euro 4000 freight	2		Second unit was used to get the device certified in Spain and Portugal. Named "Comsa 335 series"
Allco/Railcare	1,435 mm (4 ft 8 1/2 in)	Euro 4000 freight	2	2005	Allco bought two locomotives in 2005 for their leasing operation, one was sent off to the Swedish operator Tågab for winterization and certification in Norway and Sweden. The other was used for various tests and certification in Germany. Shortly after Allco decided to divest from Europe and focus on Australia and the US and subsequently turned the engines back to Vossloh. In late 2008 the engines were certified for operation in Scandinavia and about the same time the German loco was shipped to Sweden for the same winterization treatment. Since 2009, both locomotives have been owned by the Swedish rail maintenance and haulage company Railcare.
CargoNet via Beacon Rail	1,435 mm (4 ft 8 1/2 in)	Euro 4000 freight	6	2009	Allco group's European operations were bought by Bank of Tokyo and Mitsubishi to form Beacon Rail. As mentioned above, Allco had previously owned Euro 4000 locomotives, but they were turned back to Vossloh, who in turn sold them to Railcare through Tågab. Starting all over again, Beacon Rail ordered six locomotives for a lease to CargoNet of Norway.
Angel Trains (now Alpha Trains)	1,668 mm (5 ft 5 21/32 in)	Euro 4000 freight	24	2006	"Angel trains cargo 335 series" with signaling for both Spain and Portugal
Continental Rail S.A.	1,668 mm (5 ft 5 21/32 in)	Euro 4000	4	2007	For open access operations in Spain
Takargo (Cargo Rail)	1,668 mm (5 ft 5 21/32 in)	Euro 4000 freight	7	2008	For use in Iberian Peninsula, Takargo is a subsidiary of Portuguese company MOTA-ENGIL. Probably total of 14 ordered.
MBTA	1,435 mm (4 ft 8 1/2 in)	Euro 4000 passenger	0	2007	Order has not been placed due to denied waiver of Buy America Act
Ferrovial Agroman	1,668 mm (5 ft 5 21/32 in)	Euro 4000 freight	1	2009	For use in Iberian Peninsula.
Israel Railways	1,435 mm (4 ft 8 1/2 in)	Euro 3000 AC passenger	24	2011/2	Israel Railways already operates diesel locomotives from Alstom/GM-EMD (JT42BW). The locomotives will be used in push-pull mode with Bombardier Double-deck Coaches as well as the Viaggio Light coaches. First deliveries for the Euro 3000 locos are planned for September 2012. A further 9 locomotives ordered in 2012.
Israel Railways	1,435 mm (4 ft 8 1/2 in)	Euro 4000 freight/passenger	14	2011	Israel Railways already operates diesel locomotives from Alstom/GM-EMD (JT42CW). The locomotives will first be used for passenger services, later on also for freight services. First deliveries for the Euro 4000 locos are planned for November 2011.
Europorte via Beacon Rail	1,435 mm (4 ft 8 1/2 in)	Euro 4000 freight	4	2010	Configured for France/Belgium/Germany
VFLI via Beacon Rail	1,435 mm (4 ft 8 1/2 in)	Euro 4000	6	2011	Sources:
Europorte via Beacon Rail	1,435 mm (4 ft 8 1/2 in)	Euro 4000	12	2011	Sources:
PRASA	1,067 mm (3 ft 6 in)	Afro 4000	20	2013	Owned by Swifambo Rail Leasing for lease to the Passenger Rail Agency of South Africa. Also 50 Euro Dual locomotives, for delivery 2014–2016.
ETF	1,435 mm (4 ft 8 1/2 in)	Euro 4000	2	2013	Initially for LGV construction trains.
VFLI	1,435 mm (4 ft 8 1/2 in)	Euro 4000	8	2015	6 to be leased via Beacon Rail, 2 direct purchase.
Europorte	1,435 mm (4 ft 8 1/2 in)	Euro 4000	4	2015	
VFLI	1,435 mm (4 ft 8 1/2 in)	Euro 4000	3	2016	For use in France and Belgium.

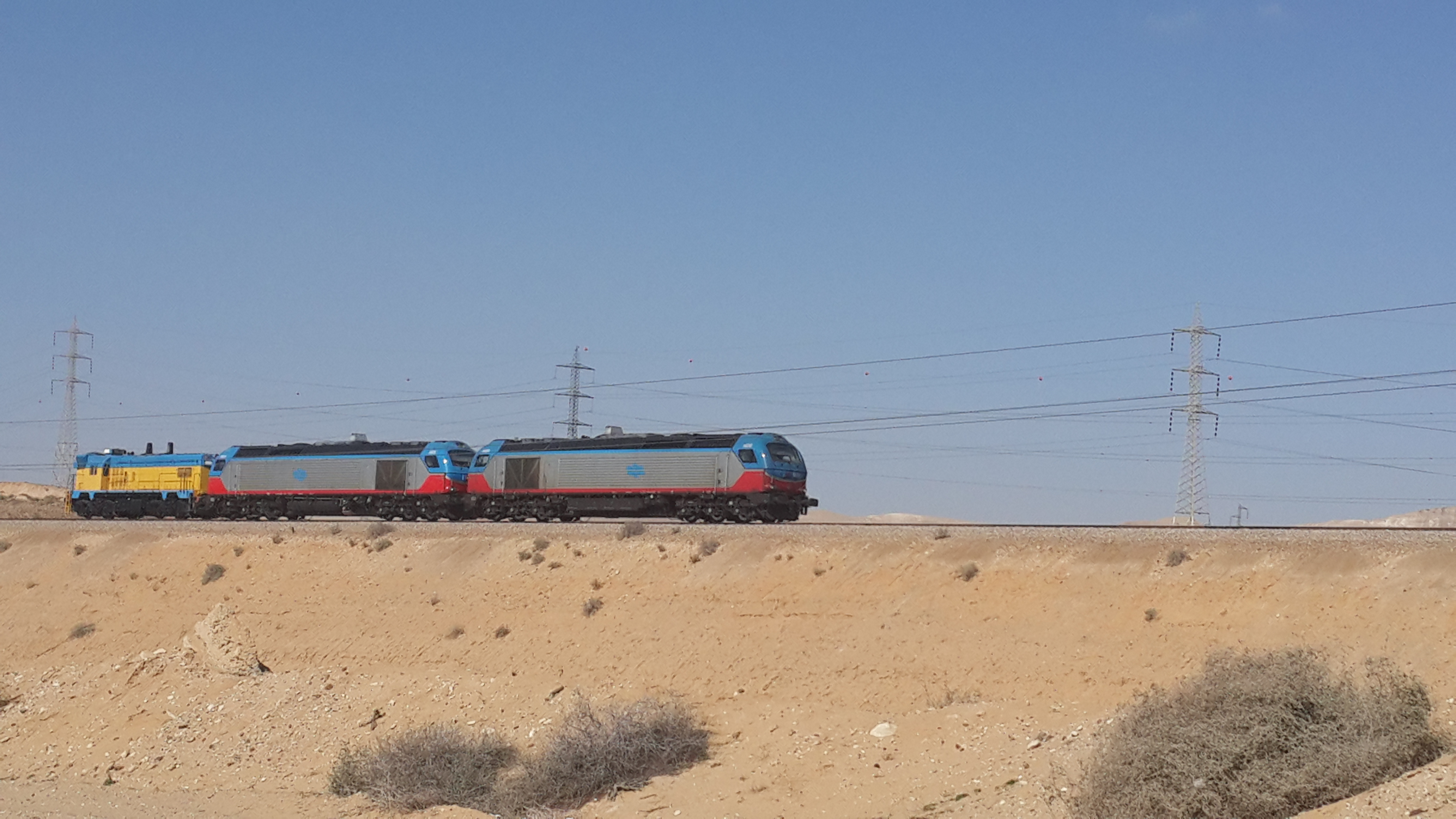
2 Euro 4000 and EMD G12 locomotives in the Negev, Israel

== See also ==
- South African Class Afro 4000
- Voith Maxima, GE PowerHaul and EMD Series 66, competitors to the Euro 4000 in 1435mm gauge.
