= Israel Railways JT 42CW =

Class of diesel-electric freight locomotives

JT 42CW
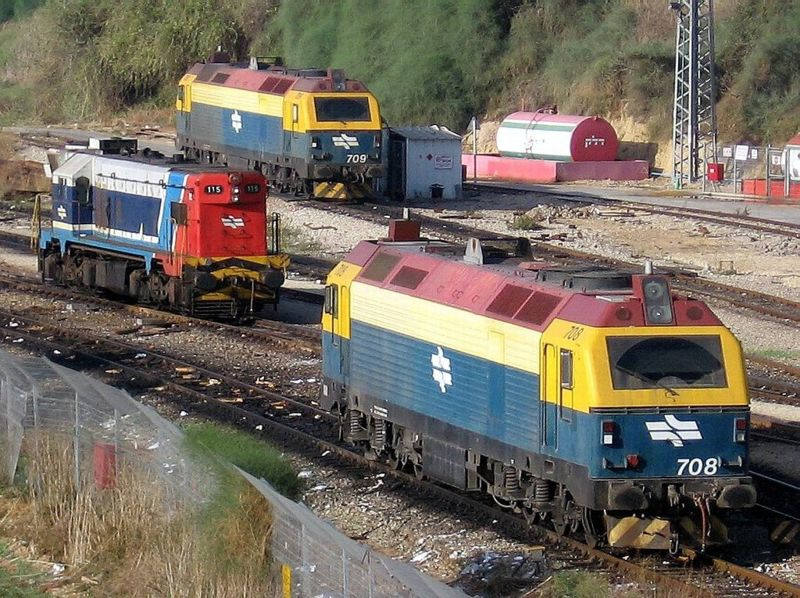
- Two JT 42CWs and an EMD G12 at Port of Ashdod
Type and origin
- Power type: Diesel
- Builder: Meinfesa (Alstom, Valencia)
- Build date: 1996
- Total produced: 8
Specifications
- Configuration
  - AAR: C-C
  - UIC: Co'Co'
- Gauge: 1,435 mm (4 ft 8 1/2 in)
- Length: 21.095 m (69 ft 2.5 in)
- Width: 2.8 m (9 ft 2 in)
- Height: 4.675 m (15 ft 4.1 in)
- Loco weight: 112 t (246,918 lb))
- Fuel capacity: 6,000 L (1,320 imp gal; 1,585 US gal)
- Prime mover: GM EMD 12N710G3B, V12, 3,200 hp (2 MW) @ 900rpm
- Alternator: AR10JBA
- Traction motors: six parallel connected D78
- Loco brake: Electropneumatic
- Safety systems: PZB, SIFA
Performance figures
- Maximum speed: 110 km/h (68 mph)
- Power output: 3,000 hp (2,237 kW)
- Tractive effort: maximum 588 kN (132,188 lbf); 306 kN (68,792 lbf) @ 22 km/h (14 mph)
Career
- Operators: Israel Railways
- Numbers: 702-709
- Sources: except where noted

The JT 42CW is a class of six axle Co'Co' diesel electric freight locomotives manufactured by Alstom's Meinfesa plant in Valencia Spain in the late 1990s for use by Israel Railways (IR).

== Description ==
The locomotives are of the Prima type, produced at Alstom's plant in Valencia, Spain in collaboration with GM-EMD; the locomotives use EMD traction equipment and an EMD 710 engine. The units were ordered in 1996 and entered service in 1998.

The locomotives were designed for freight work, but have also been used to haul passenger trains due to a shortage of locomotives.

The locomotives were specified for work hauling phosphate trains from the Dead Sea to Mediterranean ports, with loads of up to 3,000 t (6,613,868 lb) on slopes up to 1.5% to 2% (1:67 to 1:50 grades).

== See also ==
- Israel Railways JT 42BW, contemporary passenger locomotives from the same manufacturer
