= Renfe Class 333 =

Class of Spanish diesel-electric locomotive

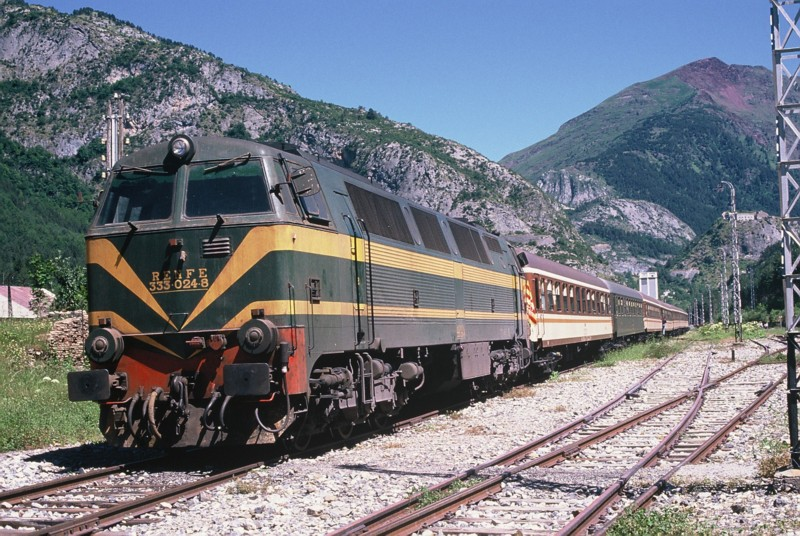
- Renfe Class 333
Type and origin
- Power type: Diesel-electric
- Designer: Macosa, General Motors, NOHAB; Refurbishment : Alstom
- Build date: Original series : 1974–1976; 333.1 1994–1995; 333.2 1997–1998; 333.3 2002–2003; 333.4 2003–2004
- Total produced: 333 (original): 93; 333.1: 8; 333.2: 4; 333.3, 333.4: 92
Specifications
- Configuration
  - UIC: Co′Co′
- Gauge: 1,668 mm (5 ft 5 21/32 in) Iberian gauge
- Bogies: General Motors 'flexicoil' type
- Length: Original: 20.7 m (67 ft 11.0 in); 333.3/333.4:: 22.33 m (73 ft 3.1 in)
- Width: Original: 3.06 m (10 ft 0.47 in); 333.3/333.4: 3.16 m (10 ft 4.41 in)
- Height: Original: 4.28 m (14 ft 0.50 in); 333.3/333.4: 4.307 m (14 ft 1.57 in)
- Axle load: 20 t (19.7 long tons; 22.0 short tons)
- Loco weight: 120 t (118 long tons; 132 short tons)
- Fuel type: Diesel
- Fuel capacity: Original: 4,500 L (990 imp gal; 1,200 US gal); 333.3: 7,200 L (1,600 imp gal; 1,900 US gal) (6,000 L or 1,300 imp gal or 1,600 US gal?)
- Prime mover: General Motors GM 16-645-E-3A 3,300 hp (2,500 kW)
- Engine type: two-stroke diesel
- Alternator: General Motors AR-10 / D-14
- Traction motors: Original: 6 of GM D-77; RENFE 333.3 and 333.4: 6 of D-78
- Cylinders: V16
- Transmission: Electric
- Loco brake: Pneumatic and rheostatic
Performance figures
- Maximum speed: 333 (original): 146 km/h (91 mph); 333.1: 160 km/h (99 mph); 333.2: 140 km/h (87 mph); 333.3: 120 km/h (75 mph); 333.4: 160 km/h (99 mph)
- Power output: Original: 1,875 kW (2,514 hp) (nominal at rail)
- Tractive effort: Original starting: 330 kN (74,000 lb_{f}) at μ=0.28 Continuous: 276 kN (62,000 lb_{f}) at 23.5 km/h (14.6 mph); Top speed: 47 kN (11,000 lb_{f}) at 150 km/h (93 mph); Rebuilt (333.3 and 333.4); Starting: 341 kN (77,000 lb_{f}) Continuous: 320 kN (72,000 lb_{f}) at 20 km/h (12 mph)
Career
- Operators: Renfe
- Nicknames: Rambo (original build)
- Locale: Spain

The Renfe Series 333 are high power six-axle diesel-electric locomotives built in the 1970s; at the time of their introduction they were the most powerful non-electric locomotives in Spain.

After three decades of service the class were rebuilt incorporating Alstom's newer technology, and thus extending their life - these rebuilt machines were given the sub-class names 333.3 and 333.4

== Background ==
Since the last 1950s, Renfe's dieselization program, with classes 316 (former 1600) and 318 (former 1800) CC locomotives, later followed by the more numerous classes 319 (former 1900) and 321 (former 2100), had displaced steam-powered traction and were responsible for much of the work requiring medium-powered locomotives. On the other hand, diesel-hydraulic class 340 (former 4000), based on the German V 200, initially intended for hauling express trains at the Madrid-Barcelona railway and other non-electrified lines, were suffering many failures from poor maintenance and being assigned to slow cargo trains. This is why Renfe was looking for a new diesel engined locomotive capable of both hauling express trains and high-tonnage heavy freight trains nationwide at a maximum speed of 62 mph.

The Class 319, produced in collaboration between Macosa and General Motors, had shown good performance, which influenced the decision to choose a locomotive of the General Motors type GT 26, (3,300 hp (2,500 kW)). In this series of locomotives, instead of taking the typical single cabin General Motors design it was decided to use a two cabined design; the Scandinavian manufacturer NOHAB had also been producing GM engined locomotives (having acquired a license to produce GM engined locomotives of its own designs), and a model was chosen based on the JT-26 with the Nohab bi-cabin box (See DSB class MZ) which was used by the Danske Statsbaner (DSB).

Renfe chose the variant model MZ1 which had a power output of almost 4,000 hp (3,000 kW), they were also able to supply electrical train heating - a first in Spain.

== Technical ==
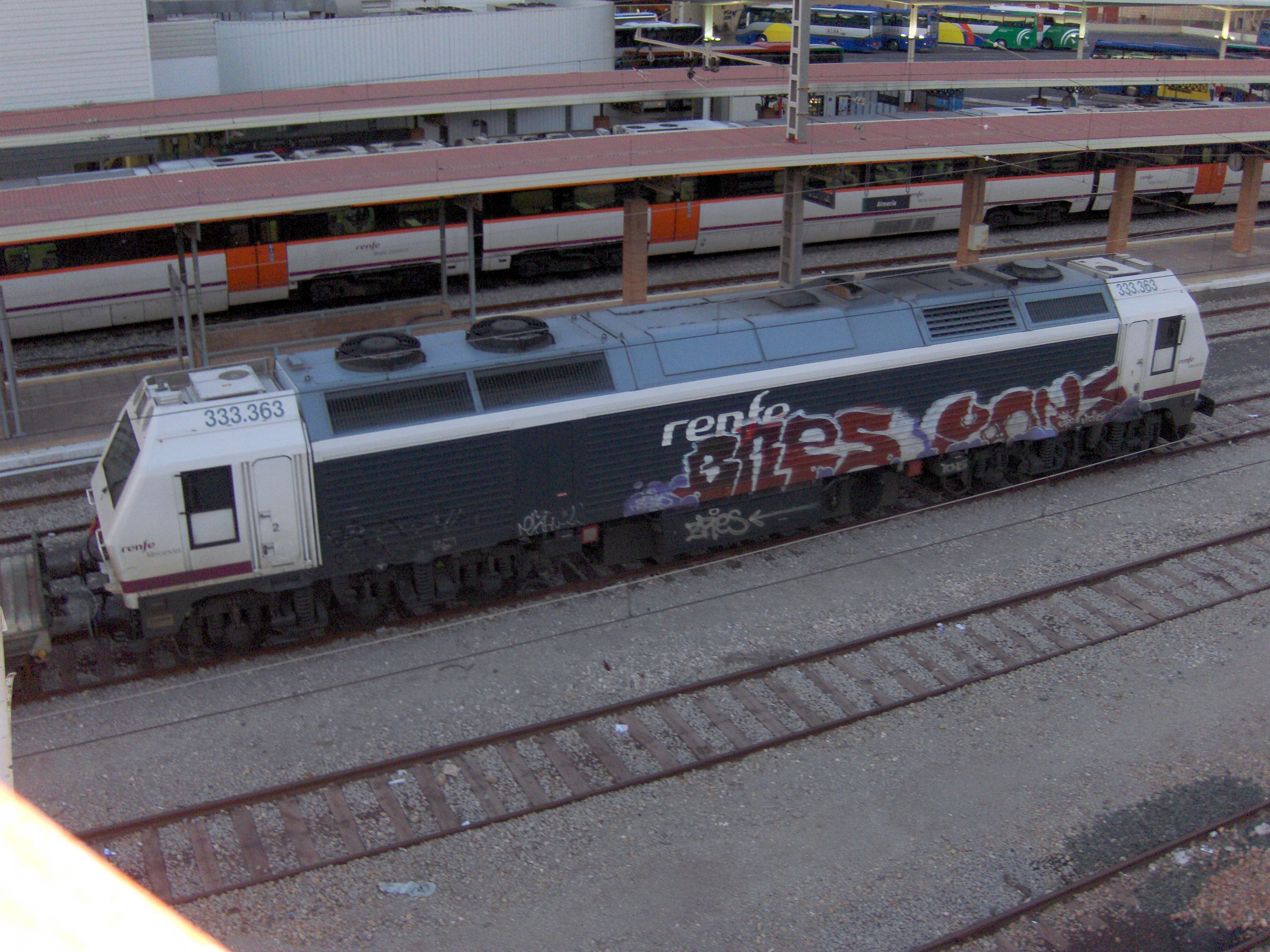
Rebuilt version 333.363 showing radiator cooling fans

The locomotives were equipped with General Motors engines, generators, traction motors and electrical equipment. The diesel engines are 45-degree offset 16 cylinder V engined, two-stroke designs (EMD 645), with a compression ratio of 14.5:1, and a displacement of 645 cubic inches (10.57 litres) per cylinder, giving a total engine displacement of 10,320 cu.in (169.12 l).

The available power for traction is 2,514 hp - produced at 600 V AC, and is rectified to DC through two groups of 30 silicon diodes, and eventually supplies six nose suspended traction motors which drive the wheels via a pinion gear at a ratio of 59:18.

The maximum speed was rated at 146 km/h (91 mph), though some of the class can travel at 160 km/h (99 mph) with appropriate modifications. The bogies are of the 'flexicoil' type.

ASFA, a Spanish train safety system was also fitted (See Train protection system)

== Service history and operators ==
The 93 units of the original series were ordered from Macosa for Renfe and delivered in several batches between 1974 and 1976. The first units were assigned to Madrid Atocha depot, where they progressively replaced class 340 on the Madrid-Burgos railway and later in other lines. Despite so, they were outran in 13 minutes by well-maintained class 340 on the 329 mile stretch between Madrid and Móra la Nova.

Other class 333 hauled services was the legendary express train from Barcelona to A Coruña/Vigo via Roda de Barà, la Plana-Picamoixons and Miranda de Ebro. Other notable services were the fast Madrid to Canfranc, and the locomotives use in dragging the Madrid to Vigo Pendular service until the line was electrified.

Ourense-junction to Medina del Campo route was served by the class 333s, which also were found in applications such as transporting coal from Samper de Calanda to thermal power stations in Andorra, and working in pairs to bring ore from Ojos Negros to the steel works at Sagunto.

On 1 January 2005 a law came into effect that began the de-monopolisation of the Spanish railway system - one effect of this new law was that private rail companies could now operate services in Spain alongside existing Renfe services. Two companies "Continental Rail" (part of ACS) and "Acciona Rail" bought Class 333.3 locomotives to operate freight services.

== Variants and rebuilds ==
Part of this class were destined to have a second life, some were upgraded in the 1990s, and yet more were totally rebuilt in the early part of the 2000s to meet new demands and at the same some losing the locomotive's distinctly 'Viking' appearance. With the rebuilding complete none of the original type remain in service.

=== Subclass 333.0 ===
These are the remainder of the original 93 locomotives, consisting of the locomotives that have remained unrebuilt, and un-upgraded. They are (or were) numbered 333.001 to 333.093

=== Subclass 333.1 ===
Eight locomotives had new bogies fitted suitable for 160 km/h operation in the early 1990s forming the subclass 333.1 They are numbered 333.101 to 333.108 and are intended for passenger operation.

=== Subclass 333.2 ===
In the 1990s four locomotives intended for mixed operation had new bogies fitted including gearing suitable for 140 km/h operation forming the subset 333.2 They are numbered 333.201 to 333.204

=== Subclass 333.3 ===
From 2000 to 2005, a total of 92 locomotives were produced from new using some components from the original series; only the engine (or prime mover) and generators as well as the ASFA train protection system were reused - the rest of the locomotive being completely new type with input from Alstom. The control electronics have been upgraded from the system of relays and contactors with a block rectifier with power electronics which are electronically controlled by microprocessors and software. The traction motors have been updated from the D-77 to D-78 type, and the fuel capacity was increased from 4,500 to 7,200 litres.

The new designs have a top speed of 120 km/h, and are intended for freight traffic. The rebuild gives improvement of 8–10% in tractive effort over the original machines, which is explained by the use of the power electronics system.

No. 333.304 (previously 333.050) was destroyed in an accident at Chinchilla de Montearagón in 2003.

=== Subclass 333.4 ===
Between 2003 and 2004 eight of the converted 333.3 machines were converted to 140 km/h running for passenger services and given the classification "333.4"

Subclasses
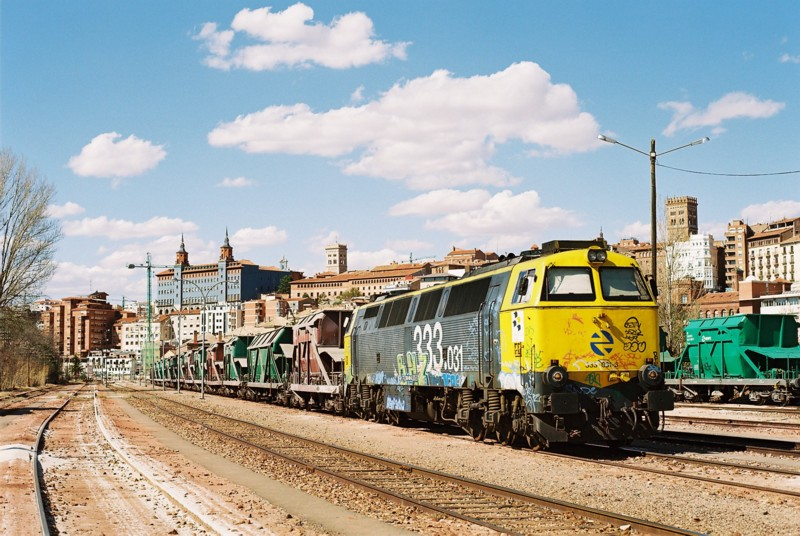
333.031 with freight at Teruel (2005)

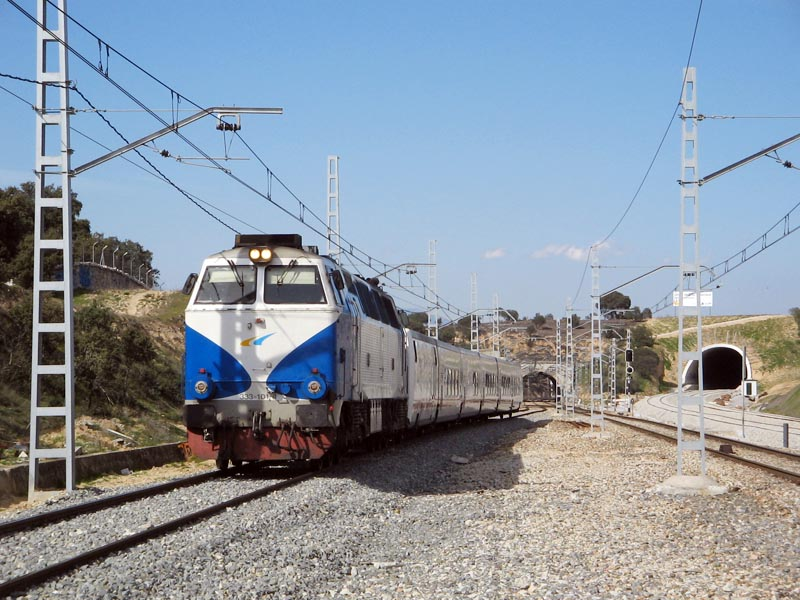
Class 333.101 pulling talgo cars (c.2006)

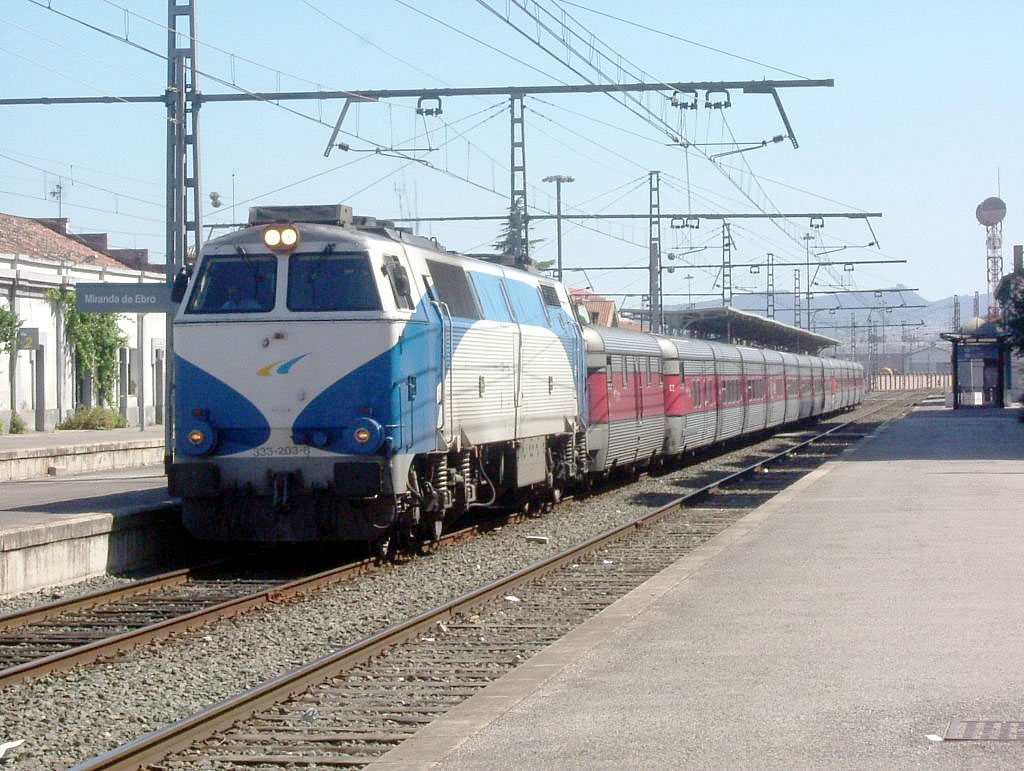
333.203 at with talgo cars (2010)

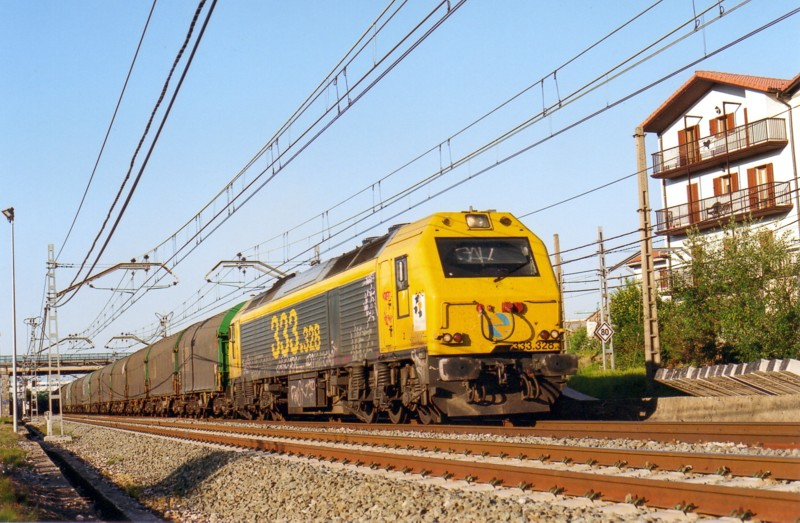
333.328 showing the new design of bodyshell (2005)

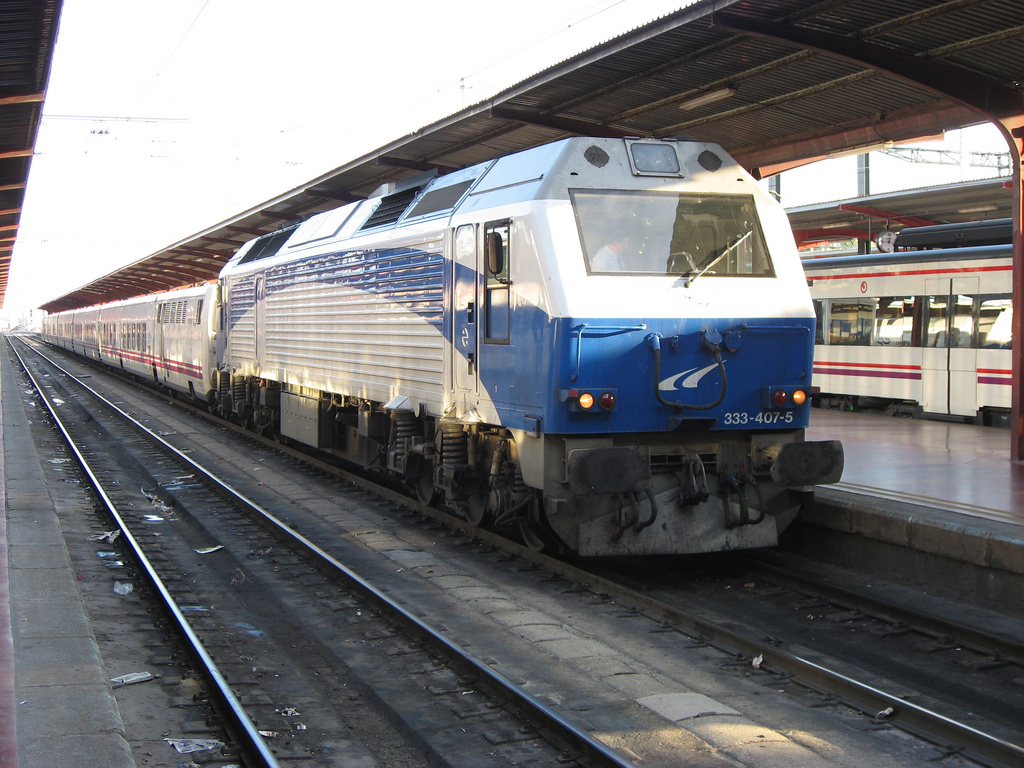
333.407 with talgo cars (2010)

== See also ==
- Renfe Class 334, a similar model to the rebuilt 333.3 and 333.4 sub types, except in that it uses a different GM-EMD engine.
- Stadler Euro, locomotives that may technically include the Class 334, and were built at the same plant in Valencia.
