= Israel Railways JT 42BW =

Locomotive

JT 42BW
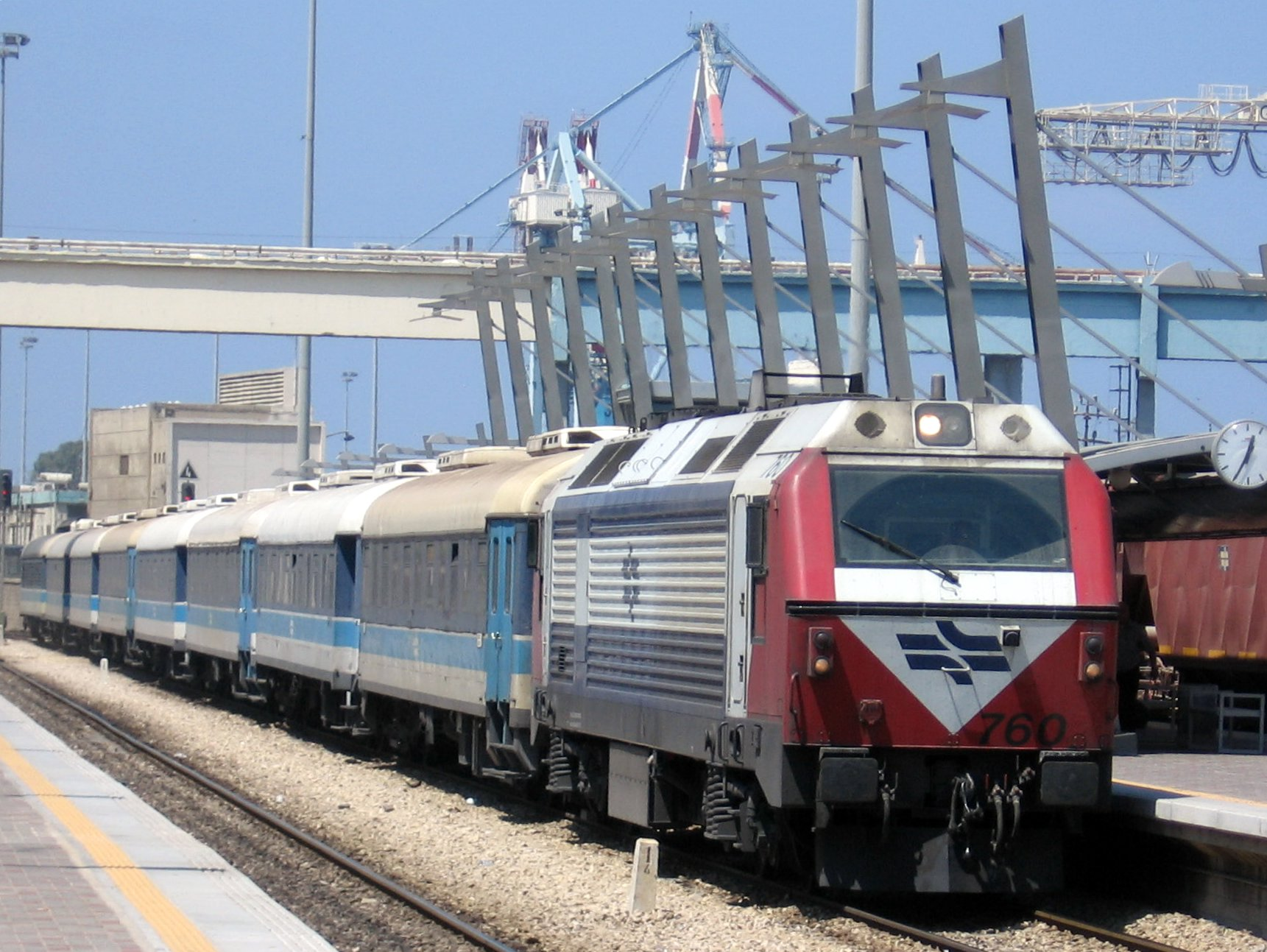
Type and origin
- Power type: Diesel
- Builder: Meinfesa (Alstom), later Vossloh España
- Build date: 1996-2006
- Total produced: 48
Specifications
- Configuration
  - UIC: Bo'Bo'
- Gauge: 1,435 mm (4 ft 8 1/2 in)
- Length: 20.46 m (67 ft 2 in)
- Width: 2.85 m (9 ft 4 in)
- Height: 4.29 m (14 ft 1 in)
- Loco weight: 90 t
- Fuel capacity: 6,000 L (1,300 imp gal; 1,600 US gal)
- Prime mover: GM EMD 12N710G3B, V12, 3,200 hp (2.4 MW) @ 900rpm
- Generator: AR10JBA
- Traction motors: four parallel connected D43 FM
- Loco brake: Electropneumatic
- Safety systems: PZB, Sifa
Performance figures
- Maximum speed: 140 km/h (87 mph)
- Power output: 3,000 hp (2.2 MW) (nominal UIC)
- Tractive effort: maximum 244kN continuous 158kN @ 44 km/h (12 m/s)
Career
- Operators: Israel Railways
- Numbers: 731-778
- Sources: except where noted

The JT 42BW is a class of four axle Bo'Bo' diesel electric locomotives manufactured by Alstom's (previously by Vossloh and now by Stadler.) Meinfesa plant in Spain for Israel Railways (IR). The locomotives were the primary passenger locomotive unit used by IR through the 2000s.

== Description ==
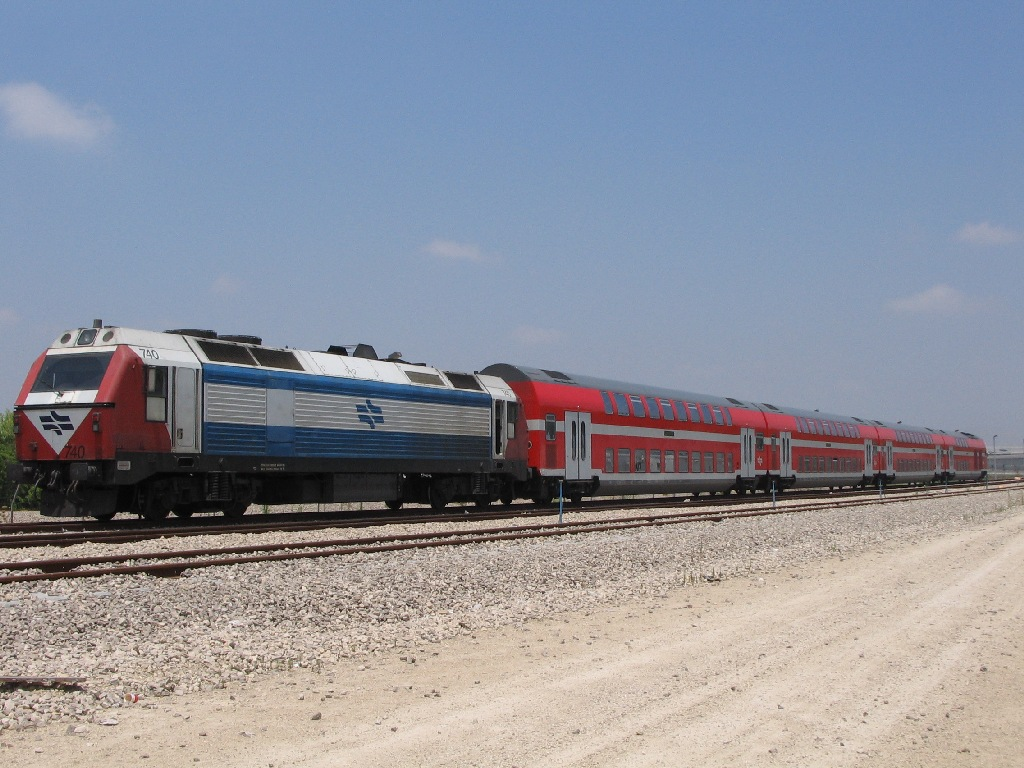
JT 42BW number 740 with double decker coaches and driving trailer

The locomotives are of the Prima type, produced at Alstom's plant in Valencia, Spain in collaboration with GM-EMD; the locomotives use EMD traction equipment and an EMD 710 engine. They were acquired to provide additional passenger services created as a result of investment in the 1990s which included the re-opening of several lines to passenger traffic. The locomotives are used to propel push-pull trains - a typical formation (2009) uses one locomotive, five double deck coaches, and a double deck driving trailer; the vehicles were the main passenger locomotive of IR, and half of its locomotive fleet (2007).

The locomotives were ordered in several batches between 1996 and 2006, the second batch of ten units allowed the 6 axle JT 42CW freight locomotives to return to their intended duties after they were transferred to passenger work due to lack of locomotives.

Two units, numbers 739 and 741 were rebuilt after being involved in accidents at Ahuzam and Beit Yehoshua.

In 2011 IR ordered 24 four axle Bo'Bo' Euro 3000 AC locomotives from Alstom Valencia successor company Vossloh España; these locomotives inherit some design features from the JT 42BW, including the use of an EMD 710 engine, though unlike the JT 42BW the locomotives use AC motors controlled by IGBT electronics.

== See also ==
- Israel Railways JT 42CW, contemporary freight locomotives from the same manufacturer
