= Stadler Rail Valencia SAU =

Spanish manufacturer of railway vehicles

- Formerly: Material y Construcciones S.A. (1947–1989); Mediterranea de Industrias del Ferrocarril, S.A. (1989–2005); Vossloh España (2005–2015)
- Type: Subsidiary
- Industry: Rail transport
- Predecessor: Construcciones Devis; Sociedad Material para Ferrocarriles y Construcciones
- Founded: 1947
- Headquarters: Valencia, Spain
- Products: Rolling stock including locomotives, bogies
- Parent: Stadler Rail

Stadler Rail Valencia SAU is a subsidiary of Stadler Rail producing products for the railway industry, located in Valencia, Spain.

== History ==
=== MACOSA ===
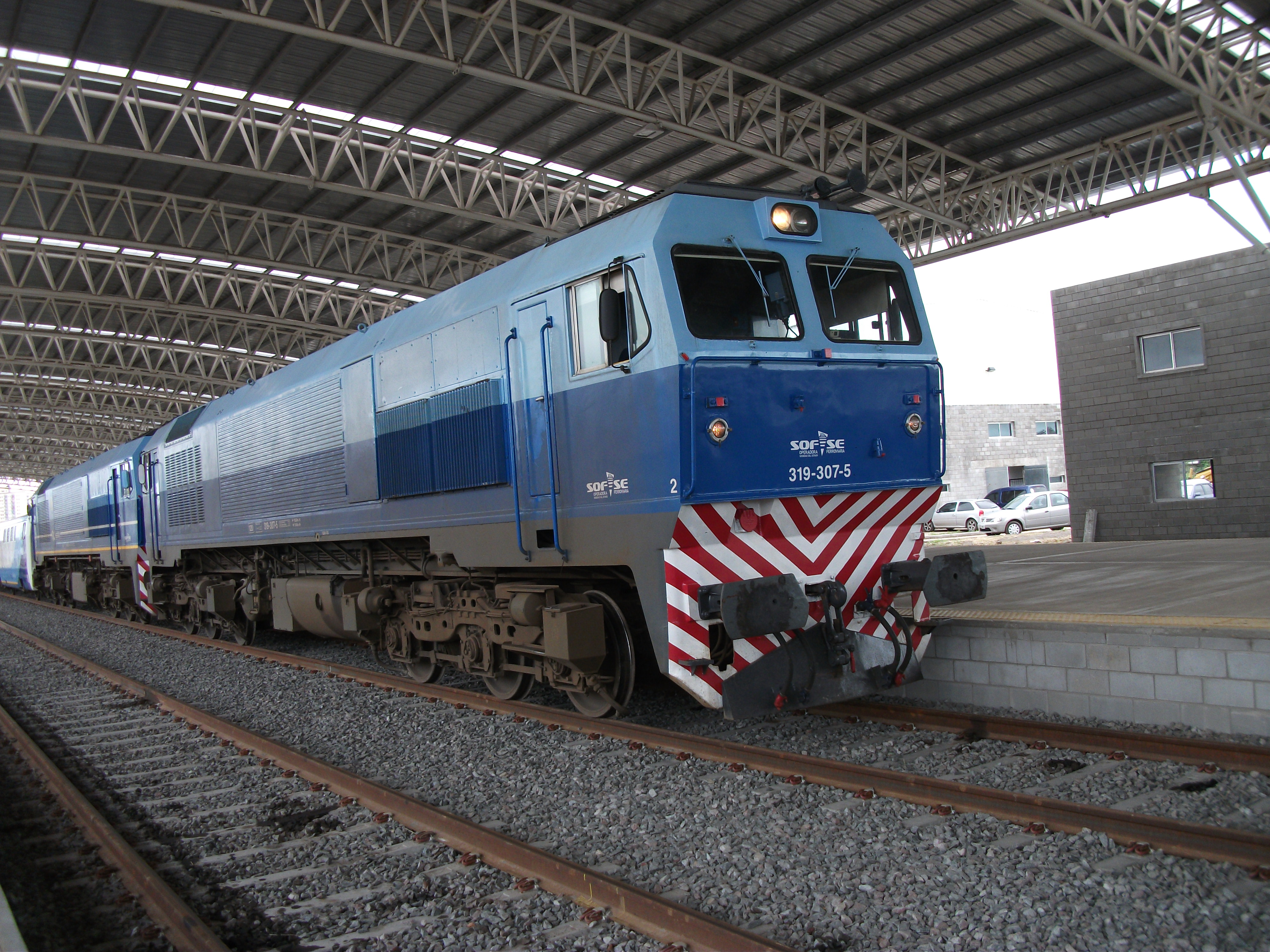
A MACOSA locomotive operated by SOFSE in Argentina.

The Company was founded in 1947 with the name Material y Construcciones S.A. (or MACOSA) by the merger of the Valencian company Construcciones Devis (founded by Talleres Devis in 1879) and the Sociedad Material para Ferrocarriles y Construcciones S.A. of Barcelona; this coincided with the beginning of the industrialisation of Spain.

Initially the organisation was not entirely rail orientated, producing buses, trolleys and other road based transportation systems. In the years following its formation the company expanded, with the Valencia plant gaining a 50,000m^{2} extension becoming one of the major producers of rolling stock in Spain. By 1952 the new company had produced 48 Type 2400 locomotives as well as two for Portugal.

The only narrow gauge locomotives constructed by MACOSA was the type 130 for the railroad of Ponferrada to Villablino in 1951 and 1956 (PV numbers 13 to 16), which were based on a type made in 1914 by Krauss-Maffeu for the Basque Railroads. (See Engerth locomotive for more information)

In the 1950s the larger Barcelona plant concentrated on casting and forming steel as well as repair of cars, buses, coaches etc. The Valencia plant produced steam boilers, as well as constructing and repairing steam and electric locomotives and other rolling stock. The valencia plant also produced other heavy engineering products such as cranes, metal parts for dams. There was also a smaller factory at Alcázar de San Juan producing and maintaining wagons.

MACOSA made the last steam locomotive for Renfe, a 2-8-2 'Mikado' with locomotive number 141-2328 produced in 1958.

Another expansion coincided with the countries' 'stabilisation plan' of 1959, and thus the company formed part of the rapid economic growth of Spain in the 1960s, triggered by the industrialised economy reaching critical mass. (See Spanish economic miracle)

During the 1960s locomotives were produced under license from General Motors, at first practically the entire locomotive was of GM design, later the company produced much of the locomotives to its own design, but still using a GM (later Electro-Motive Diesel) engine and transmission system. This arrangement continued well into the 2000s, with successor companies still manufacturing diesel electric locomotives in Valencia with GM engines and transmission systems.

In 1970, MACOSA was the second company of the rail vehicle sector in Spain, after Construcciones y Auxiliar de Ferrocarriles.

During its long history over a thousand locomotives were produced: first steam, then electric and diesel-electric as well as shunting locomotives. In addition countless other rail vehicles were produced: trams, metros, diesel and electric units and freight wagons as well as thousands of bogies, some for Spain, others for destinations around the world.

=== Meinfesa ===
In 1989 the company became Mediterranea de Industrias del Ferrocarril, S.A. (or Meinfesa) and became part of the GEC-Alsthom multinational in 1991, after this the company moved locomotive production to a new plant at Albuixech (Valencia).

After the move the huge original factory was to be demolished, and despite attempts to save it due to its historical significance to the country of Spain (as well as due to architecture of the 1920s built central core - with huge nave-like sheds), like many other derelict industrial sites around the world, progress could not be stopped, and in a final twist of fate, its destruction made space for the AVE high speed train to run through.

Shortly thereafter (1990-2), a big order from Renfe was received for the sub-types 319.2, 319.3 and 319.4; under GEC-Alstom's ownership GM-EMD engined diesel locomotives were also produced at the plant for export to the UK and Israel.

Additionally 60 General Motors type GM-8B Class 310 for Renfe between 1989 and 1991, and the GA-DE 900 AS diesel electric shunting locomotive (based on the RENFE Class 311) was produced during the 1990s for the state railways of Switzerland (SBB Am 841), the railways of Mexico, Israel Railways, and for the Egyptian National Railways.

=== Vossloh España ===
In March 2005 ownership changed again, this time to Vossloh, and the organisation was renamed Vossloh España, as part of the Vossloh group.

In the first five years of Vossloh ownership the GA 1000 AS shunter was built for SNCF, the Renfe Class 333 was rebuilt, the RENFE Class 334 was constructed and, later, the production of EMD powered Stadler Euro locomotives started. The 1,000 mm (3 ft 3 3/8 in) metre gauge 1,500 V DC electric passenger metro trains Serie 4300 were also produced in this period for Ferrocarrils de la Generalitat Valenciana.

=== Stadler Rail Valencia SAU ===
The company was sold to Stadler Rail in late 2015 for €48 million. Stadler took over the business on 1 January 2016.

== Notable products ==
Stadler Euro Dual

- CP Class 592, originally for Renfe, later operated by Comboios de Portugal (CP)
- GM SD40-2, built from 1979 to 1980 under license from General Motors for RFFSA in Brazil
- EMD G22U / EMD G22CU, built from 1971 to 1973 under license from General Motors for RFFSA in Brazil
- Renfe Class 269, built from 1973 to 1985 by CAF and Macosa under licence from Mitsubishi
- Renfe Class 333, a powerful locomotive, built using General Motors components to a NOHAB design originally found in the DSB class MZ
- Series 4300 EMUs for Metrovalencia lines 1, 2, 3, 5, 7 and 9
- Stadler Euro, Stadler Eurolight, Stadler Euro Dual
- Stadler Citylink
