= NIR MPV =

NI Railways Multi-Purpose Vehicle
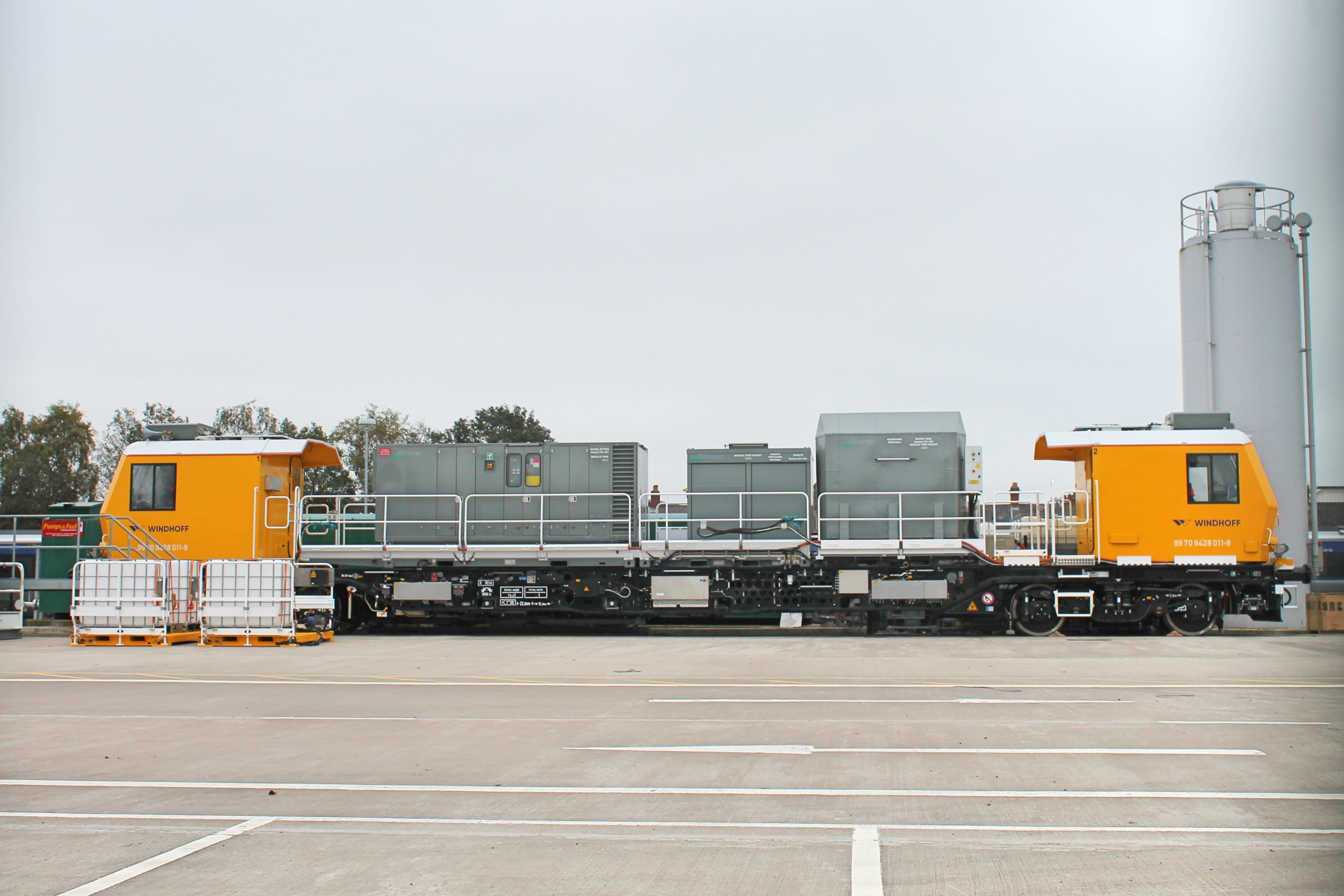
- In service: 2016–present
- Manufacturer: Windhoff
- Family name: CargoSprinter
- Replaced: NIR Class 80
- Constructed: 2016
- Entered service: 2017
- Number built: 1
- Number in service: 1
- Formation: 1 cars
- Fleet numbers: 99 70 9428 011-9 (UIC); 11 (NIR)
- Operator: NI Railways

Specifications
- Maximum speed: 100 km/h (62 mph)
- Prime mover: MTU
- Track gauge: 1,600 mm (5 ft 3 in)

The Multi-purpose vehicle is a purpose built departmental derivative of a diesel multiple unit constructed for use as a rail adhesion vehicle by NI Railways in Northern Ireland.

== History ==
The vehicle was built by Windhoff in Germany, and is based on the Windhoff CargoSprinter unit, similar to the vehicles used by Network Rail on the British network. The double ended vehicle is designed primarily to apply sandite and use high pressure water jets on the rail to improve adhesion. However, the design is modular, allowing the swapping of equipment to undertake other work, including weed spraying and tree surgery. The MPV has been built to pull wagons as required.

The vehicle was delivered in October 2016 and on the 1st if November NIR 110 number 8111 preformed break tests with the vehicle. On the 5th of November 8111 undertook gauging with the vehicle trials prior to its entry into service. This coincided with the final use of NI Railway's 80 Class sandite train during the leaf fall season in 2016. The vehicle received the UIC identification number 99 70 9428 011-9, while it was numbered as 11 by NIR.

== Gallery ==
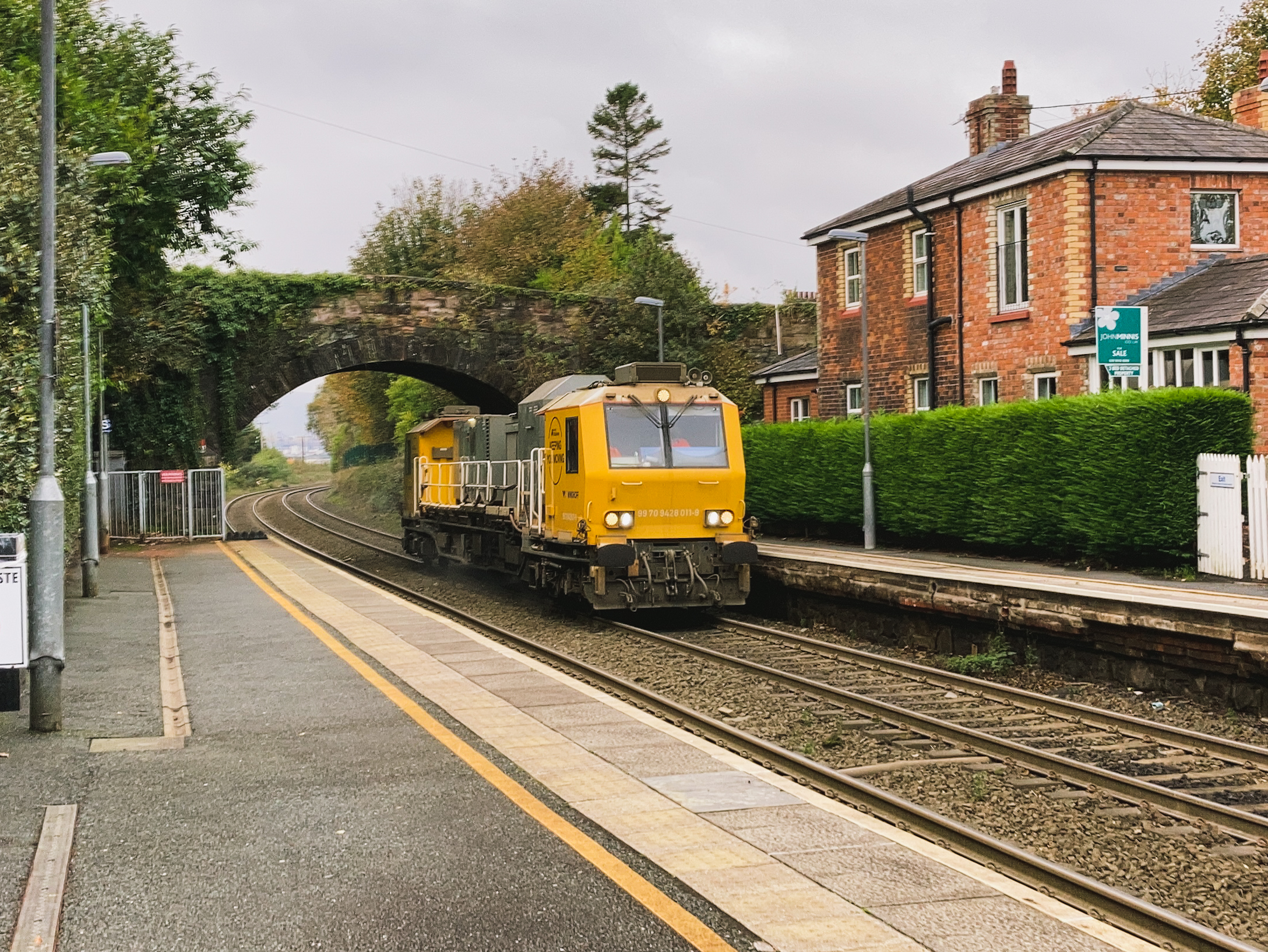
MPV passing through Marino station

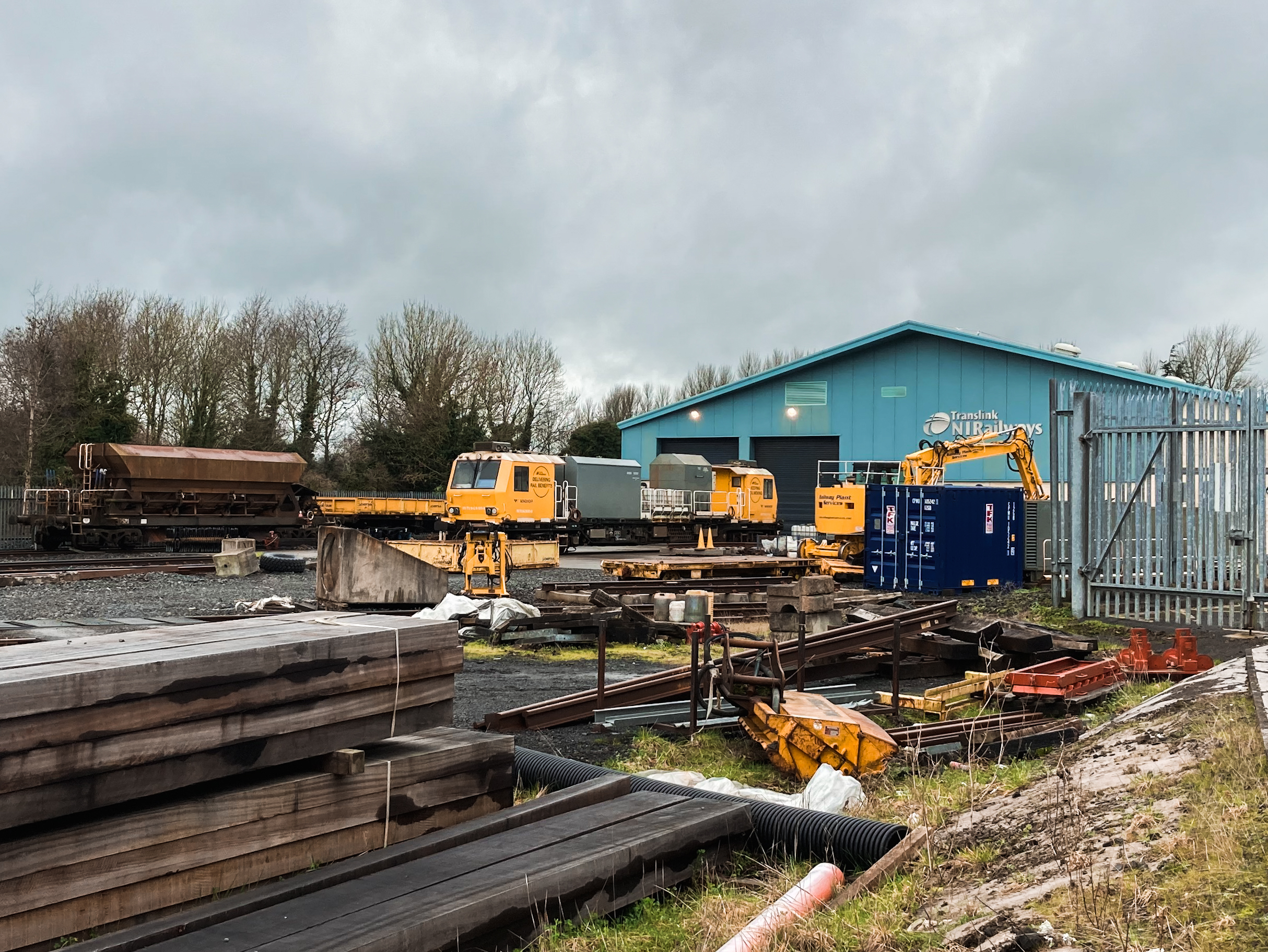
The MPV parked at Ballymena Permanent Way Yard.
