= Renfe Class 310 =

Renfe 310
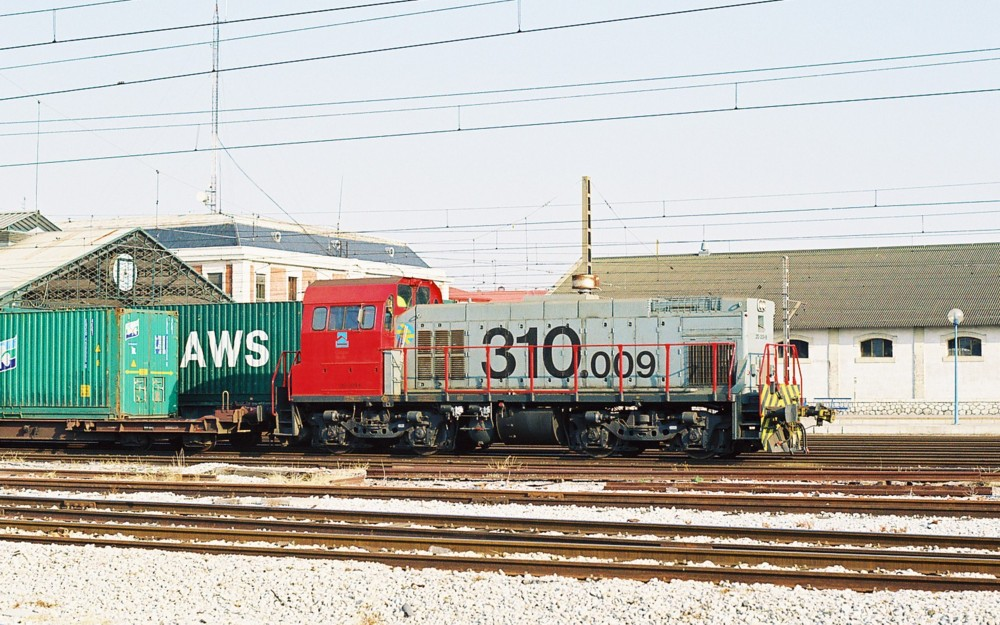
- Renfe 310.009 (August 2003)
Type and origin
- Power type: Diesel-electric
- Builder: Meinfesa, Wesa; GM-EMD (engine)
- Model: SW 1001 AC
- Build date: 1989-91
- Total produced: 60
Specifications
- Configuration
  - UIC: Bo'Bo'
- Gauge: 1,668 mm (5 ft 5 21/32 in)
- Wheel diameter: 1,067 mm (42.0 in)
- Length: 12.550 m (41 ft 2.09 in)
- Width: 3.085 m (10 ft 1.46 in)
- Height: 4.305 m (14 ft 1.49 in)
- Loco weight: 78 t (77 long tons; 86 short tons)
- Prime mover: GM 8-645-E
- Engine type: Two-stroke Diesel engine
- Traction motors: 4
- Transmission: Electric
- Loco brake: Pneumatic
Performance figures
- Maximum speed: 110 km/h (68 mph) (or 114 km/h or 71 mph)
- Power output: 598 kW (802 hp)
- Tractive effort: 131.59 kN (29,580 lb_{f}) up to 17 km/h (4.7 m/s)
Career
- Operators: Renfe
- Locale: Spain

The Renfe Class 310 is a class of 60 four axle Bo'Bo' diesel-electric locomotives for shunting and freight built by Meinfesa with General Motors Electromotive Division components (engine, electrical transmission).

In the mid-2000s 4 units were converted to a subclass 310.1; a push-pull container train with a 310 class locomotive at each end; the units later became the property of Ferrocarrils de la Generalitat de Catalunya (FGC) and became the 353 Series.

== History and design ==
The Renfe 310 was ordered in the late 1980s as a replacement for the Renfe Class 307 and 308. The order was part of a modernisation of the diesel shunting fleet in the 1980s which also resulted in the Renfe Class 309 and 311. The 310 Class is a variant of the General Motors SW1001 switcher with a modified cab shape.

The locomotives were painted in the standard silver and red livery standard for Renfe shunting locomotives.

As of 2010 the class are split between Adif and Renfe Mercancías.

=== Class 310.1 ===
4 units have been converted to a formation known as "Medium Distance Teco" (TMD) (Spanish: Teco de Media Distancia); this is a service intended to move containerised freight a distance between 120 and 300 km (75 and 186 mi), and compete with road transport. (Note: The push-pull freight train concept is also found in the CargoSprinter (Germany) and M250 series (Japan)) Each train consists of 8 60 ft (18.29 m) wagons and a class 310 locomotive at either end, with a container capacity of 24 TEU. The locomotives are connected by optical fibre. The 310.1 locomotives received modified cabs, similar to the design of the rebuilt Renfe 333.3 subclass.

Later the two sets were sold to FGC and in 2009 began use transporting car parts to a SEAT factory. Under FGC ownership the units became the class FGC 353.

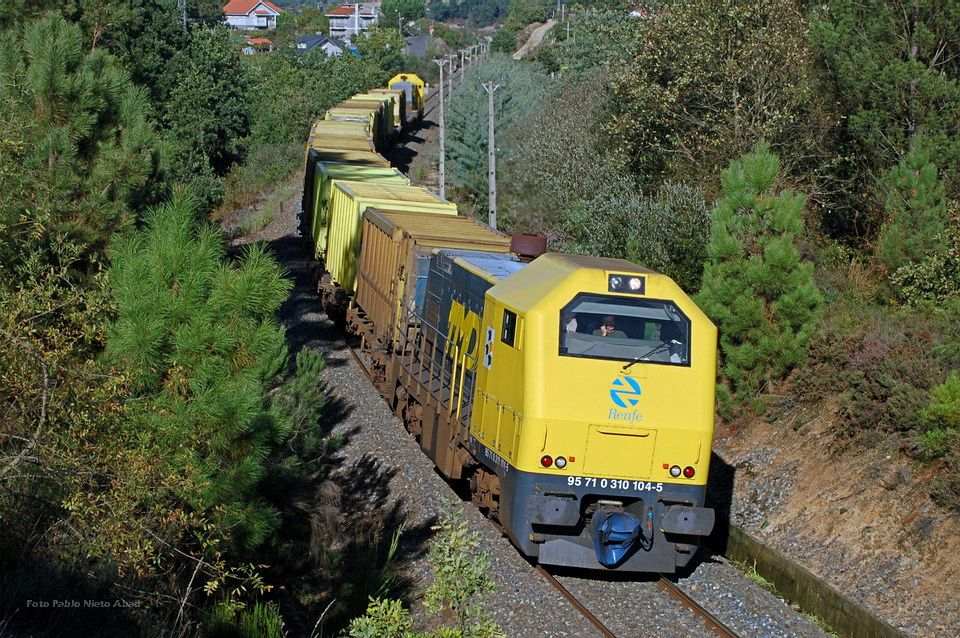
Renfe 310.1 rubbish/waste container train (August 2006)

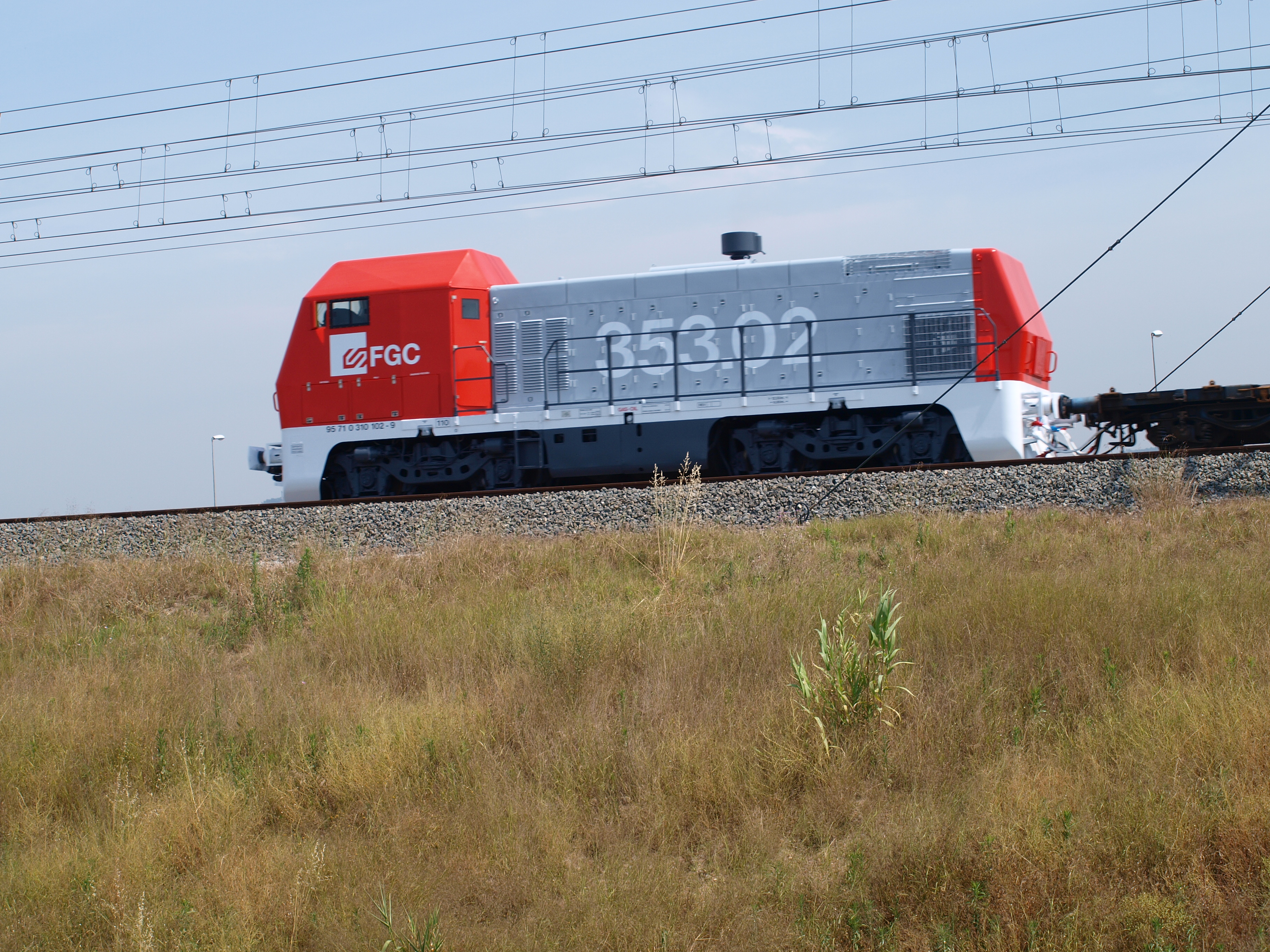
FGC 353 class (June 2009)

== See also ==
- EMD SW1001 General Motors switcher locomotive, and basis of the class 310 design
