= British Rail MPV =

British Rail diesel multiple unit

Railtrack Multi-Purpose Vehicle
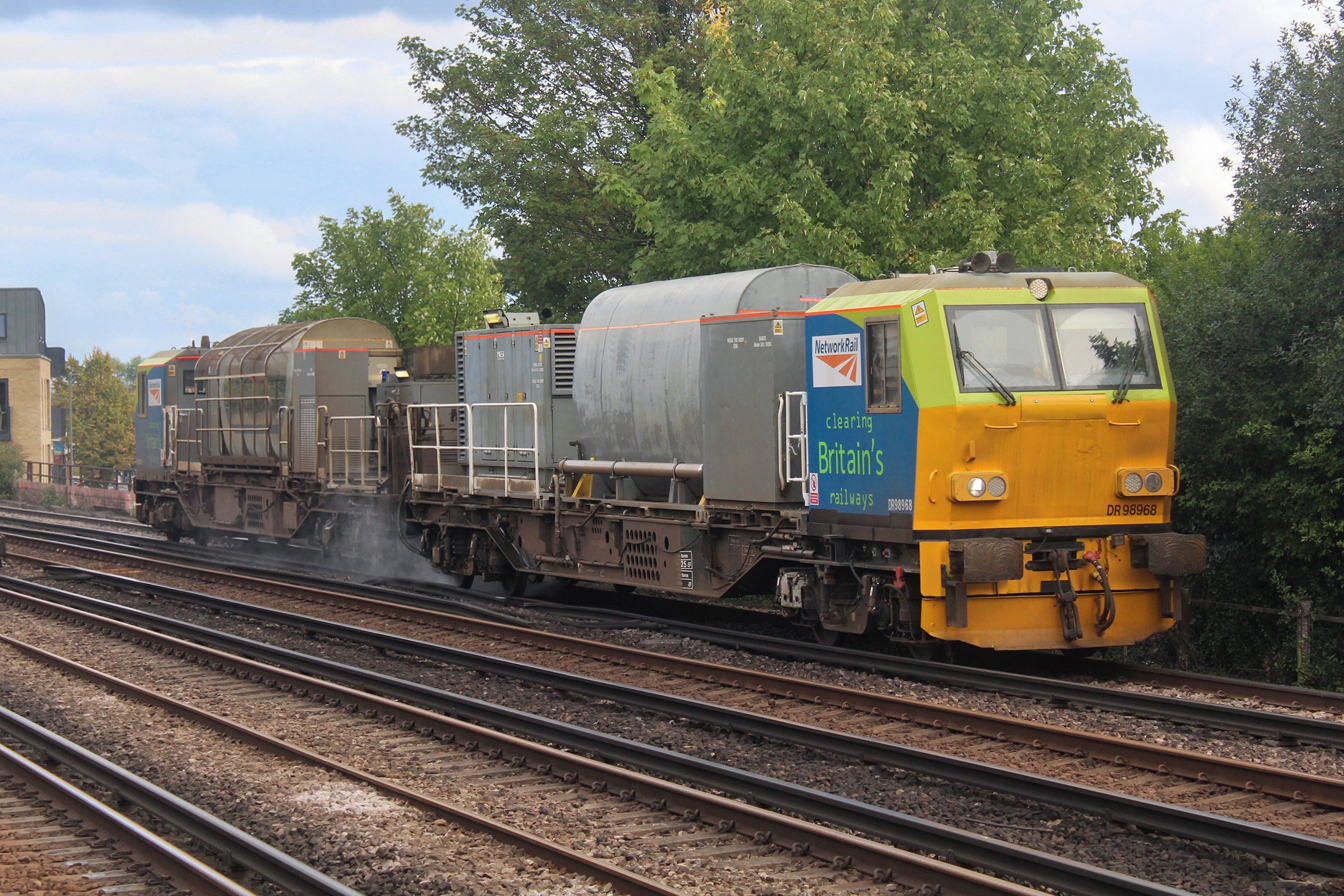
- DR98968 + DR98918 passing Raynes Park
- In service: 1999 - Present
- Manufacturer: Windhoff
- Built at: Münster
- Family name: CargoSprinter
- Constructed: 1998-2001, 2012
- Entered service: 1999-present
- Number built: 18 single units; 32 double units
- Formation: 1 or 2 cars
- Operator: Network Rail

Specifications
- Track gauge: 1,435 mm (4 ft 8 1/2 in) standard gauge

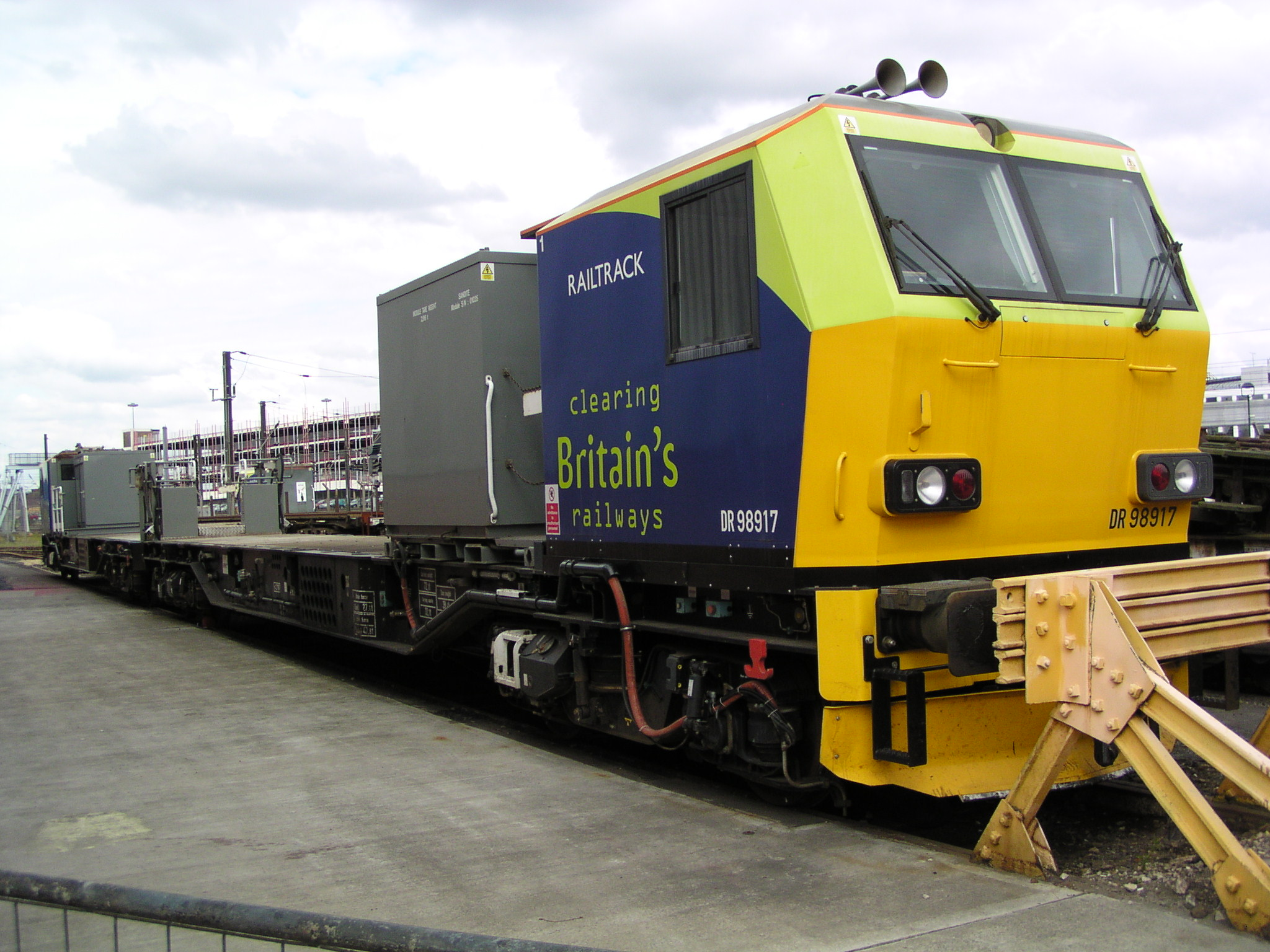
Railtrack MPV, nos. DR98917+DR98967, at Doncaster Works in 2003. These purpose-built departmental vehicles were built to replace older trains converted from former passenger vehicles.

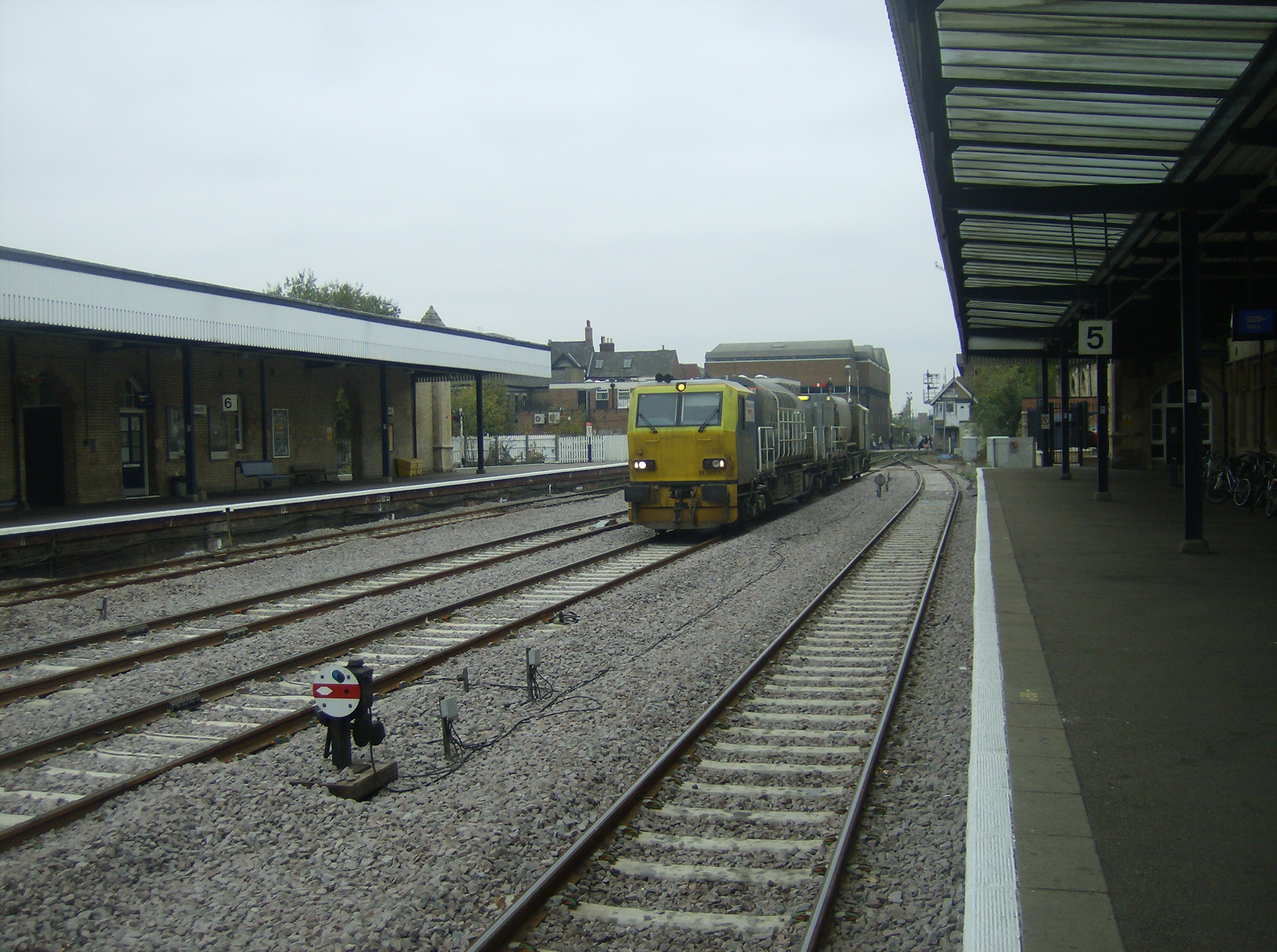
DR98915 and DR98965 passing through Lincoln in 2007

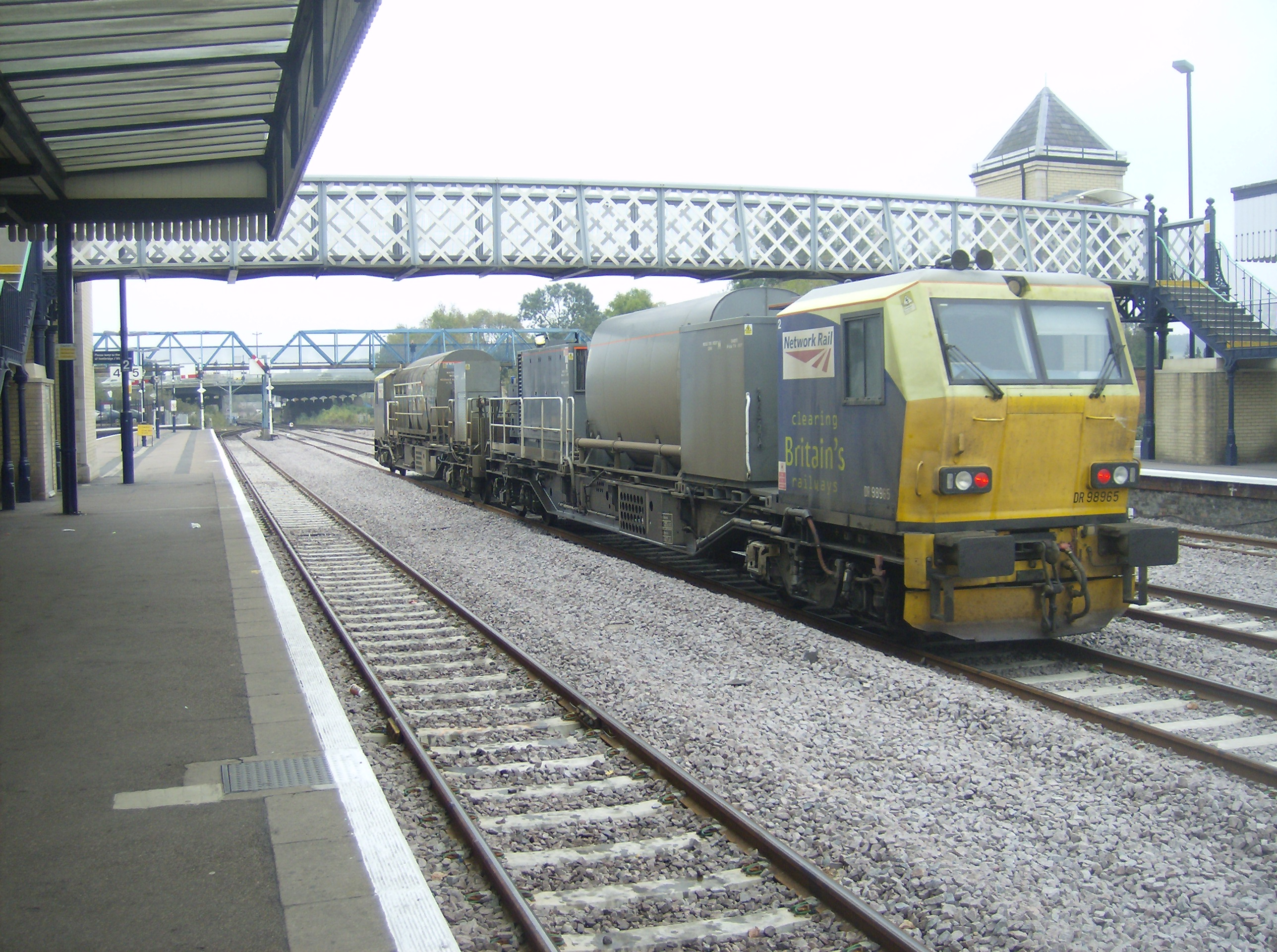
DR98915 and DR98965 passing through Lincoln in 2007

The Multiple-purpose Vehicle or MPV is a purpose-built departmental derivative of a diesel multiple unit. Twenty-five two-car units were ordered by Railtrack to enable it to replace its varied collection of ageing departmental vehicles, many of which were converted from redundant passenger stock.

The vehicles were built in Germany by Windhoff. The design is based on the Windhoff "CargoSprinter" units that are operated by Deutsche Bahn (Germany) and CRT Group (Australia). Normally a unit consists of one powered vehicle fitted with twin 265 kW (355 hp) Railpac diesel engines, semi-permanently coupled to an unpowered slave unit without engines. The later orders for the South East of England and for overhead line replacement are instead composed of two powered units, to give better acceleration and top speed. When first built there were problems with the vehicles being 'out of gauge' when running empty.

The concept of the design is that each vehicle has a driving cab and an under floor engine/transmission with Multiple unit (MU) control. The majority of each vehicle is a flat load bed that can carry combinations of 10-foot and 20-foot modules that are secured using the locking system for ISO standard containers. Modules can be changed as required to suit current requirements.

In 2005, two powered MPV units were used to form a "Freight Multiple Unit" for freight trials, made by coupling standard freight wagons in between the pair of MPV units. Temporary multiple unit control cables were run along the wagons in order to connect the two MPVs, which are acting as locomotives working as a push-pull train.

In 2025, a MPV used for removing leaves from rail track was named "Ctrl Alt Deleaf" after a public poll.

== Variants ==
There are five distinct types of MPV unit that represent the development of the concept for use in the UK. All are owned by Network Rail.

Number Range			Description	Comments
DR98901-902	+	DR98951-952	Prototypes	Work in semi-permanently coupled pairs, e.g. DR98907+DR98957.
DR98903-925	+	DR98953-974	Production units	Work in semi-permanently coupled pairs, e.g. DR98907+DR98957.
DR98926-932	+	DR98976-982	Production units	Work in semi-permanently coupled pairs, e.g. DR98907+DR98957.
DR98001-014			Overhead-Line MPV	Some painted in White livery and some now in Network Rail yellow livery. Were used on West Coast Main Line, most are now stored.
DR97011-014			Overhead-Line MPV	Painted in Blue livery. Used on High Speed 1.

=== High output wiring train ===
For the replacement of overhead lines on the West Coast Main Line at the start of the 2000s, Railtrack designed and ordered two new self-powered High Output Wiring Trains (HOWT). The order was placed with Windhoff in July 1999 and the first train available for trials in Germany in June 2000 before being shipped to the United Kingdom shortly afterwards. The replacement program using the new trains began in November 2000.

Replacement of a tensioned overhead span measuring 1000–1500 metres takes four hours with a HOWT, compared to sixteen hours for original method (using rolling stock and road-rail vehicles). Up to 30 crew are required to operate the HOWT.

The full train comprises nine vehicles; four MPV CargoSprinter-based units and five flatbed units. All of the units were designed to accept standard shipping container modules, secured with standard ISO twistlock clamps, allowing modules to be transferred as needed. After the full train has arrived at the work site it is split into five sections. The sections follow each other along the length of wire to be replaced, each performing a step in the wiring renewal process, according to the modules it carries:

1. Old wire recovery
  - MPV unit (short working platform), facing forwards
  - Flatbed unit (old wire cable drums)
2. Catenary cleanup
  - Flatbed unit (long working platform)
  - Flatbed unit (long working platform)
3. New wire deployment and tensioning
  - Flatbed unit (new wire cable drums)
  - MPV unit (short working platform), facing backwards
4. Registration and alignment
  - MPV unit (short working platform), facing forwards
  - Flatbed (long working platform)
5. Measuring and recording
  - MPV unit (recording/pantograph cabin; rotating working platform), facing backwards

At the end of February 2003, a total of 650 wire lengths had been replaced by the two trains. Two conventional wiring trains would have taken over seven years, as the conventional trains would be limited to one single sixteen-hour engineering possession per week (only available at weekends). The cost of each of the two trains was £3.3 million.

=== Welsh freight trials ===
For a five-week period beginning in March 2005, trials were undertaken in Wales, transporting timber from Aberystwyth to a wood-chip factory at Chirk.

The daily service, arrived at Aberystwyth at 09:22, allowed approximately 2.5 hours for loading of the timber and then departed, loaded, at 11:50 as 6Z21. On the single-track Cambrian Line the freight service was timed to follow in the footsteps of a regular passenger service to avoid potentials for delay. The combined freight multiple unit (FMU) reversed in platform three at Wrexham General railway station and continued to the Kronospan private siding at Chirk.

The formation used the two halves of an MPV pair, sandwiched around seven open-sided air-braked timber (OTA) wagons. The MPV vehicles are normally designed to carry a combination of short shipping containers, and for the trial, one specially built containerised timber carrying module was constructed for the trial at a cost of around £15,000 and mounted on MPV DR98919. For the trial, the other MPV vehicle (DR98916) carried a water-tank module for ballast. MPV units normally operate as pair consisting of a powered unit and an unpowered trailer; for the timber trials, both of the MPV units were powered versions. Additional mobile cab signalling equipment had to be carried.

The trial had been scheduled to being on 3 March 2005. The first trip took place on 5 March 2005 and continued on weekdays until 1 April 2005. Loading at the Aberystwyth end was done with the train directly on the running line as no suitable terminal facilities were available and could be managed in as little as 90 minutes, with the use of three lorries delivering the timber supply.

Out of the twenty-five scheduled journeys in the trial, nineteen were run, transporting a total of 2845 tonnes of timber (an average of 150–154 tonnes per trip). Loading capacity was reduced on the first journey by an imposed requirement by Network Rail to tow a British Rail Class 37 at the rear of the train as insurance up the thirteen-mile 1-in-47 incline at Talerddig.

=== Switches and Crossings video train ===
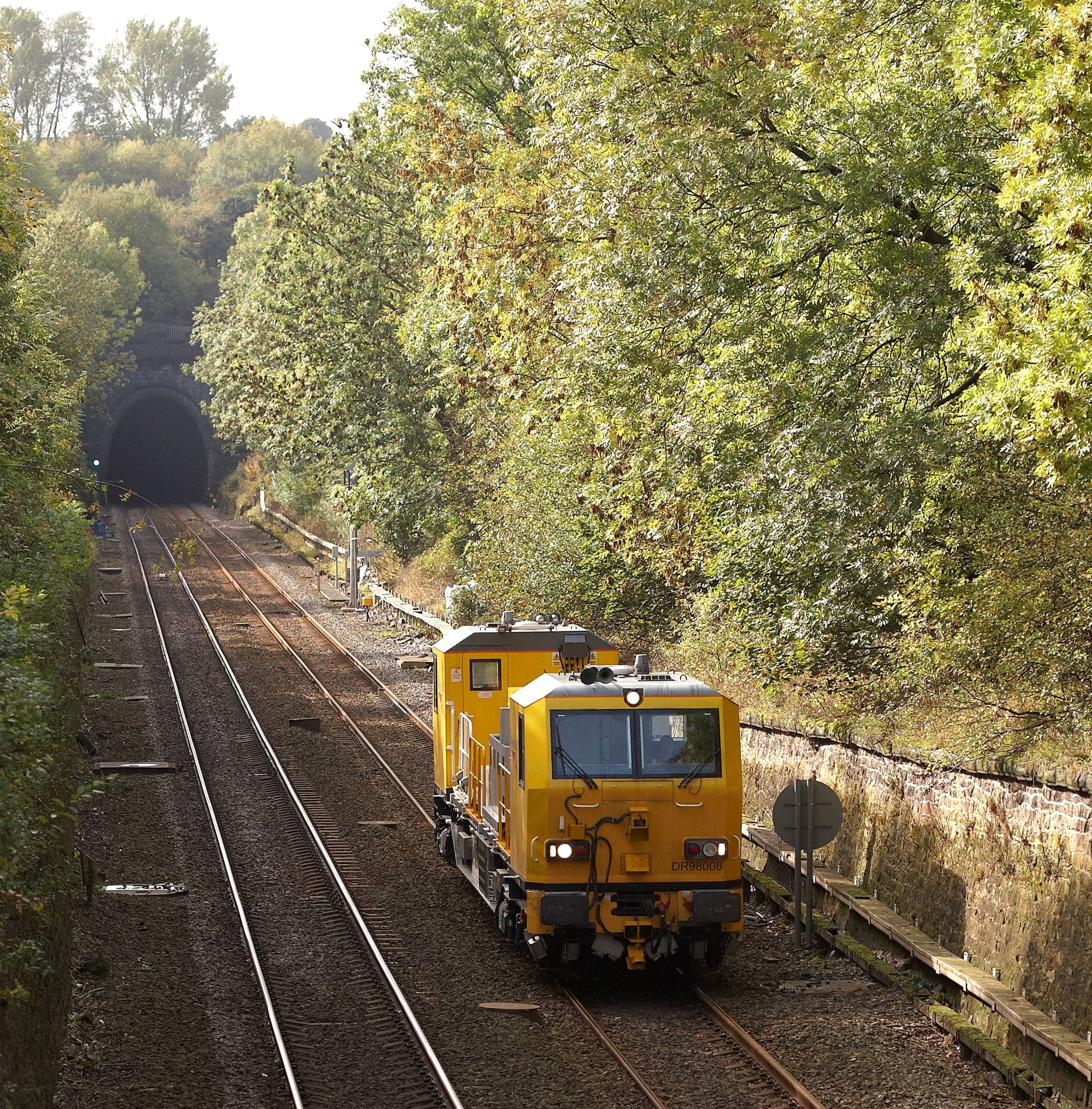
DR98008 configured as the S&C video train in 2011

Double-ended single-unit MPV number DR98008 is used by the Network Rail Asset Information department as a track geometry and video train. In the Manchester area the unit is allowed to operate permissively throughout all station areas, replacing a large number of walked inspections.

== Accidents and incidents ==
- On 3 December 2006, an MPV ran away following a collision with a tree. Similar to the later October 2017 incident, debris activated the brake release mechanism on the MPV, but was exacerbated by the operator failing to set the hand brake before dismounting to inspect the MPV for damage.
- On 22 March 2016, an MPV ran away on the East Lancashire Railway and entered Manchester Metrolink tracks, where it was derailed on catch points.
- On 17 October 2017, an MPV performing leaf removal duties near Markinch, Fife collided with a tree across the line. The accident damaged the MPV's braking system, causing the train to run away for 4 miles (6.4 km). Two crew sustained slight injuries jumping from the train. The Rail Accident Investigation Branch released their report into the incident on 11 January 2018. The RAIB determined that debris from the tree strike activated a brake release mechanism on the MPV. The debris also separated all three brake hoses, which prevented the driver from reactivating the brakes.
- On 15 August 2021, an MPV collided at low speed with a rail grinder in the Thames Tunnel, part of High Speed 1.
- On 16 November 2023, MPV DR97012 collided with tamper DR73916, which was being coupled to MPV DR97011 at the time. One person was injured. The accident occurred on High Speed 1 near Strood, Kent.

== See also ==
- CargoSprinter
- M250 series (a Japanese freight EMU)
