= Tunnel rescue train =

Tunnel rescue train may refer to:

- DB tunnel rescue train on the German railways
- SBB-CFF-FFS tunnel rescue train on the Swiss Federal Railways
