= SNCF Class BB 60000 =

SNCF BB60000
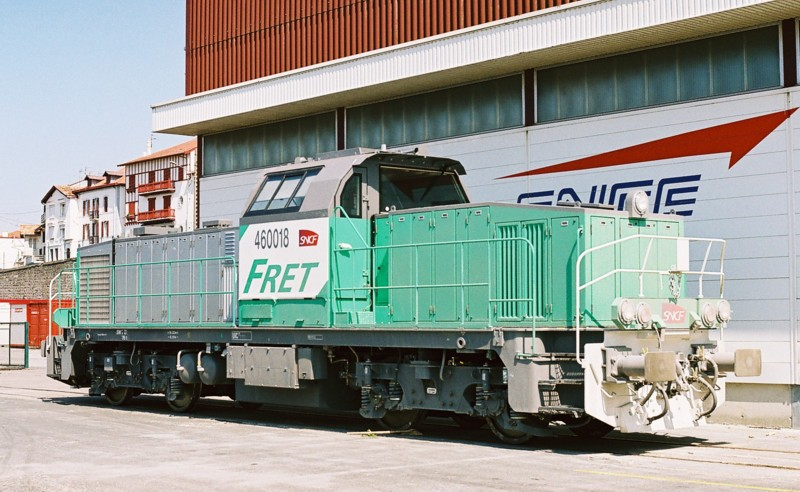
- Newly delivered BB 460018 at Hendaye
Type and origin
- Power type: Diesel-electric
- Builder: Vossloh España components Alstom & Caterpillar Inc.
- Build date: SNCF order 2004–2008
Specifications
- Configuration
  - UIC: Bo′Bo′
- Length: 15.33 m (50 ft 4 in)
- Loco weight: 76 short tons (69 t; 68 long tons)
- Fuel capacity: 3,000 L (660 imp gal; 790 US gal)
- Prime mover: Caterpillar CAT3508B
- Engine type: Diesel engine
- Traction motors: 4× Alstom FRA3055A with IGBT powerpacks ??
- Transmission: Diesel-electric transmission
- Safety systems: Crocodile, KVB
Performance figures
- Maximum speed: 100 km/h (62 mph)
- Power output: 1,000 kW (1,300 hp)
Career
- Operators: SNCF Fret / SNCF Infra
- Number in class: 175 (155 FRET, 20 INFRA)
- First run: 2006
- Disposition: in service

The SNCF Class BB 60000 are a class of 4 axle heavy shunting and light freight diesel–electric locomotives built at the Vossloh España works in Valencia. Since the class is primarily used as a freight locomotive the class is commonly referred to as SNCF BB 460000. (Note: The prefix "4" used by FRET for freight locomotives)

SNCF made an initial order for 160 locomotives in 2004. The manufacturer's designation is GA 1000 AS. Two further machines have been ordered (2009) by Egenie of France.

The class is not to be confused with the SNCF BB 60000 prototypes from the 1950s and 1960s.

== History ==
At the end of the 1990s SNCF was faced with a diesel locomotive fleet of which the larger part was older than 30 years, and thus fuel-consuming and expensive in maintenance. Some locomotive classes were re-engined (BB 66400 in BB 69400, CC 72000 in CC 72100) to overcome some of the problems on the short term. In the longer term however, new locomotives had to be ordered as also the re-engined locomotives would reach the end of their useful age.

An initial plan saw 69 medium-power locomotives (together with the SBB) and 55 high-power locomotives ordered. This plan was intensively modified, and eventually 160 low-power shunting locomotives (SNCF BB 460000) and 400 medium-power locomotives (see BB 475000) were ordered.

For the low-power shunting locomotives there were 3 biddings: Vossloh offered the G1000BB, the Italian firm Firema the D146 locomotive and Alstom with an enhanced version of the SBB Am 841 locomotives. The Vossloh bid was deemed too expensive and also Firema couldn't convince FRET, so Alstom was awarded the contract in 2004. By 2006 Vossloh had become owner of the Alstom plant in Valencia, and thus inherited and completed the order.

At first the locomotives were to be powered with an MTU engine, as those engines were used in BB 69400 and BB 75000 locomotives and had a good performance, but the MTU engine was replaced with one from Caterpillar due to financial reasons.

In October 2008 SNCF ordered an additional 15 locomotives for its Infrastructure division. These locomotives were numbered in the 660000 series, (Note: The prefix "6" is used by the infrastructure division (SNCF Infra) for its locomotives) and were painted in the yellow and grey Infrastructure livery.

== Design and construction ==
Initially SNCF wanted to buy a "catalog" locomotive, i.e. a standardised locomotive type without too many changes. Alstom proposed an enhanced version of the SBB Am 841, which were the latest shunting locomotives Alstom had built. But SNCF wanted access to the cab by frontal doors instead of side doors; thus the cab had to be completely redesigned. Because of this the BB 60000 is considered to be a type of itself instead of a version of a standard locomotive.

The locomotive has nearly all of its technology derived from the SBB Am 841, except for the cabin, engine and electric equipment. It has 2 hoods: the longer one houses the Caterpillar CAT3508B engine and the alternator, while the shorter one houses the electrical and brake equipment.

The cabin is rounder than the SBB Am 841 from which it is derived. It has 2 full control desks and is equipped with air-conditioning. Bogies are the same as its predecessors and have primary (coil springs with Silentbloc, plus vertical shock absorbers) and secondary ("Sandwich" blocs) suspension. There are two traction motors per bogie powered by IGBT based electronics. Brake equipment only consists of wheel brakes which are equipped with plastic brake pads.

The locomotives were built by Vossloh España, the electrical transmission (generator, rectifier, IGBT inverters, traction motors) was supplied by Alstom.

== Career ==
After a homologation period of 2 years the first locomotives were delivered in late 2006. They faced some teething problems such as inadequate brake pads, causing unreliable shunting operations, and unwanted shocks caused by the locomotive's software. The first ten locomotives were retrofitted by Vossloh. The rest were delivered with the modifications.

All locomotives are allocated to the depot of Sotteville, nowadays known as the EIMM Normandie. This is their home depot however the locos work elsewhere in France and are maintained locally returning to their main depot of Sotteville only for major overhauls or modifications. Spheres of operation from 2010 are Paris (Le Bourget, Villeneuve-Saint-Georges, Trappes, Montereau, Chartres) Rennes, Saint-Pierre-des-Corps, Bordeaux, Hendaye, Picardie region and Nord-Pas-de-Calais region. They cover heavy shunting and local trip work. For example, the Nord-Pas-de-Calais operate 14 non-nominated locomotives based for local maintenance at Lens and operating from Somain, Lille Delivrance and Dunkerque. Two locomotives in multiple-working are capable of hauling over 3,500 tonnes on the Lestrem branch line from Armentieres served from Lille Delivrance yard.

One unit has been used for SNCF's "Zéro pétrole" project (first decade 2000), and tested for operations using a 100% biodiesel derived fuel.

== See also ==
- SBB Am 841, GA DE900, and Renfe 311: earlier locomotives from the same factory to a similar design.
- SNCF BB 75000: higher powered mainline diesel locomotives ordered in the same period.
