= SBB Am 841 =

Swiss diesel locomotive

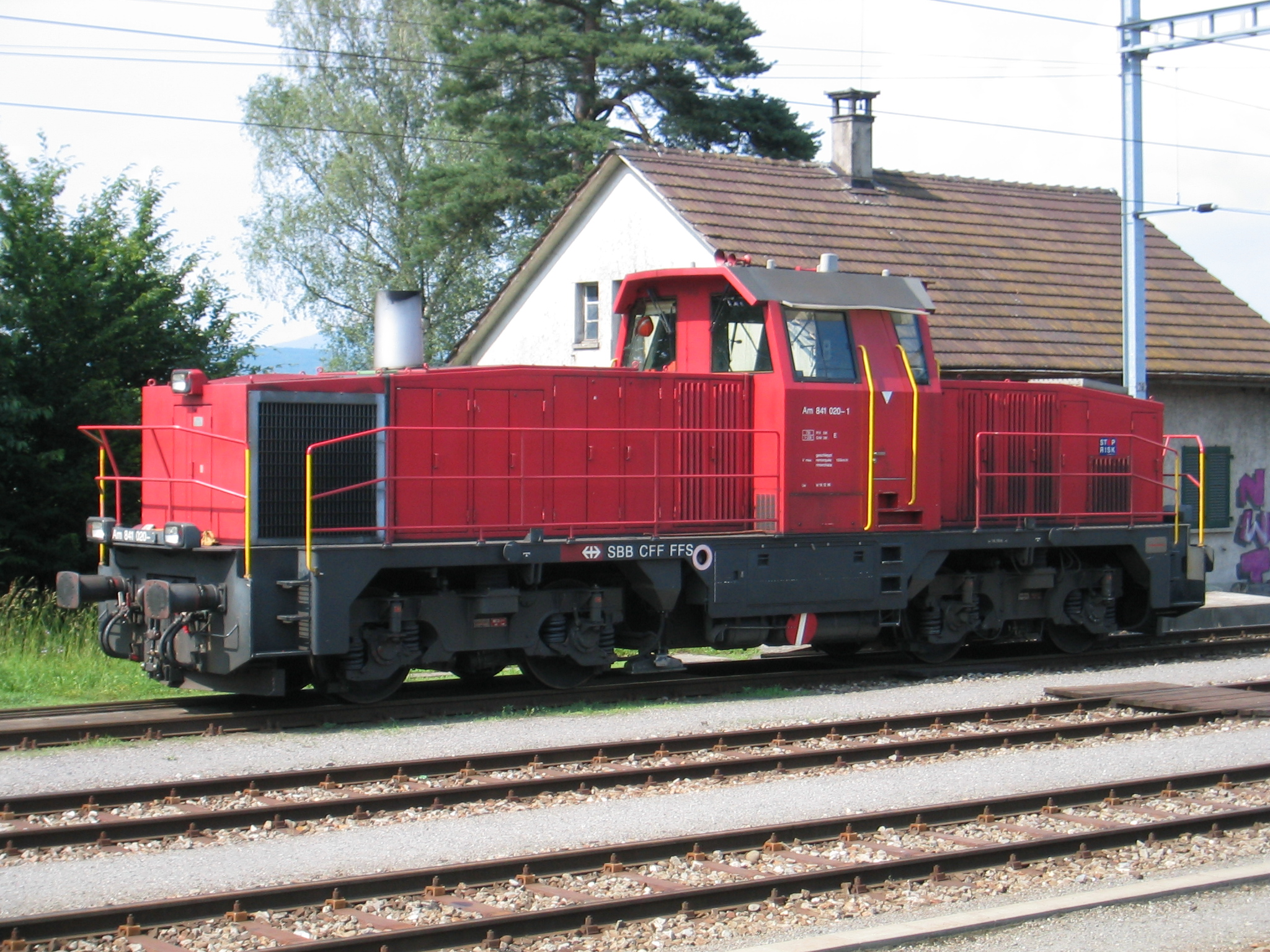
- CH SBB AM 841 at Möhlin/AG Schweiz in June 2003
Type and origin
- Power type: Diesel-electric
- Builder: Meinfesa
- Total produced: 40
Specifications
- Configuration
  - UIC: Bo′Bo′
- Gauge: 1,435 mm (4 ft 8 1/2 in)
- Length: 15.33 m (50 ft 4 in)
- Loco weight: 72 tonnes (71 long tons; 79 short tons)
- Fuel capacity: 3,000 litres (660 imp gal; 790 US gal)
- Prime mover: MTU 8V 396 TB 14
- Traction motors: 4x Alstom 4FRA3055A with GTO powerpacks
- Transmission: Diesel electric
Performance figures
- Maximum speed: 80 km/h (50 mph)
- Power output: 920 kW (1,234 hp)
Career
- Operators: Swiss Federal Railways
- Number in class: 40
- Disposition: In service

The SBB Am 841 was built at the Meinfesa locomotive plant in Albuixech, Spain in 1994. The locomotives were based on the RENFE Class 311.

== See also ==
- GA DE900 locomotives : locomotive class including the Am841 and versions sold to railways of Egypt and Israel.
- SNCF Class BB 60000 : a later and similar product from the Meinfesa factory in Spain.
