= Renfe Class 311 =

Spanish diesel shunting locomotive

Renfe 311
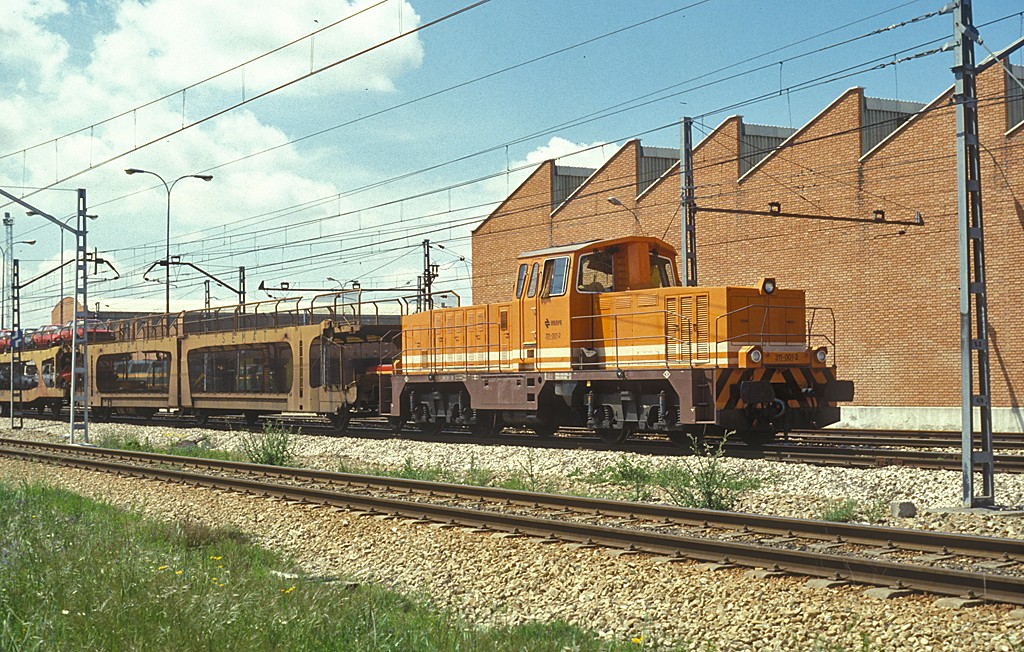
- Renfe 311.001 prototype (1986)
Type and origin
- Power type: Diesel-electric
- Builder: 311.0 prototype: M.T.M., Ateinsa, Babcock & Wilcox; 311.1: Alstom (Meinfesa), Siemens, Bazán
- Build date: prototype 1985; 1989-1991
- Total produced: 61
Specifications
- Configuration
  - UIC: Bo'Bo'
- Gauge: 1,668 mm (5 ft 5 21/32 in)
- Wheel diameter: 1,100 mm (43.31 in)
- Length: 14.200 m (46 ft 7.1 in)
- Width: 2.900 m (9 ft 6.17 in)
- Height: 4.250 m (13 ft 11.32 in)
- Loco weight: 80 t (79 long tons; 88 short tons)
- Prime mover: MTU 396 B V TC 13
- Loco brake: 311.0 prototype: Vacuum; 311.1: Pneumatic, rheostatic
Performance figures
- Maximum speed: 90 km/h (56 mph)
- Power output: 1,065 hp (794 kW)
- Tractive effort: 255 kN (57,000 lb_{f}) @ 7.5 km/h (4.7 mph)
Career
- Operators: Renfe
- Locale: Spain

The Renfe Class 311 is a class of four axle Bo'Bo' diesel electric shunting and light freight locomotives.

== Background and design ==
The prototype locomotive 311.001 was designed by M.T.M. (Barcelona), Ateinsa (Madrid) and Babcock & Wilcox (Bilbao); the project was led by the Instituto Nacional de Industria. (Note: The locomotives are sometimes known as Mabi from the initials of the companies involved in the design of the locomotive.)

The prototype locomotive led to an order of 60 units, which were assigned to the subclass 311.1, and numbered 311.101 to 311.160.

The transmission system uses 4 axle hung pinion drive three-phase asynchronous motors powered by a three phase alternator driven by a MTU engine partly license built by Bazán. Siemens supplied Sibas-16 microprocessor engine control systems.

The prototype locomotive was initially painted orange with a white stripe, the series production were all given a red/silver livery; standard for Renfe shunting locomotives. Some units have subsequently received a more recent white/grey Renfe livery. As of 2010 most of the units are operated by Renfe Mercancías, about one third have been assigned to the infrastructure company Adif.

=== Derivatives ===
The locomotives were a success for the Spanish engineering industry, and the design formed the basis of a number of locomotive types exported from the Meinfesa factory: the SBB Am 841 (40 units 1994), the GA DE900 locomotives for Mexico, Israel and Egypt (35 units, 1997-2000) and the SNCF Class BB 60000 (175 units, 2004-8).

== See also ==
- Renfe Class 309 and Renfe Class 310: contemporary shunting locomotives ordered a during the same period of modernisation of Renfe's shunter fleet.
