= CRT Group =

- Formerly: Colin Rees Transport
- Industry: Intermodal freight transport
- Founded: 1954
- Defunct: December 2014
- Headquarters: Sydney, Australia
- Revenue: $100 million (2014)
- Number of employees: 250 (2014)
- Website: www.crtgroup.com.au

CRT Group is an intermodal transport company in Australia. It was founded in 1954 as Colin Rees Transport, a taxi truck company in Sydney. In 1981 it became known as the CRT Group, and by the time of its acquisition by QR National in June 2005, was in the top 10 logistics companies in Australia with a turnover of $80 million, and moving over 600,000 tonnes of freight a year. The company specialised in the movement of food products, polymers, and plastics.

== Railway operations ==
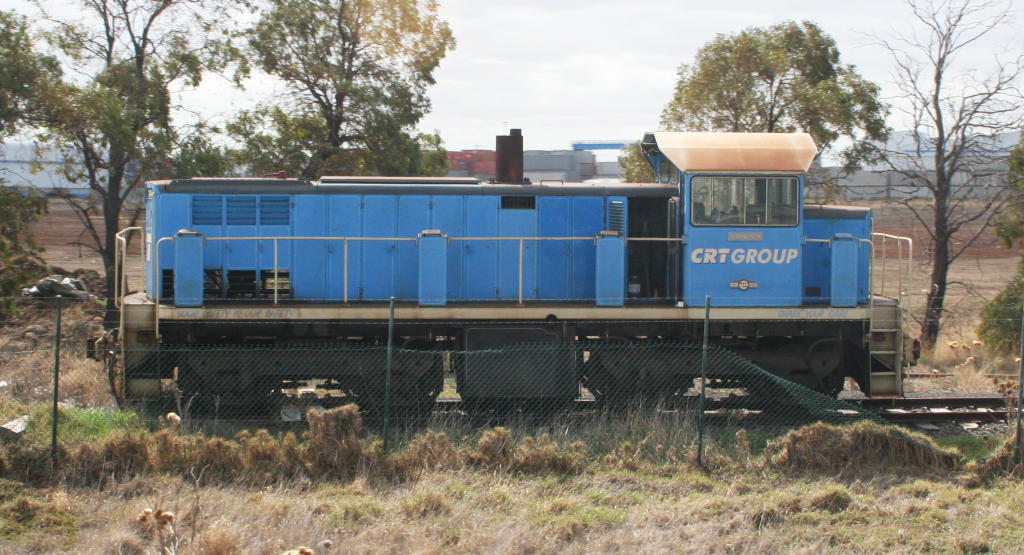
7334 at CRT Group's Altona North terminal in March 2007

CRT Group operated a number of terminals, with those at Yennora in Sydney and Altona North in Melbourne provided with their own railway sidings. Privately owned X100 and X200 class rail tractors X101, X107, X118, X208, X209 and X216 were used to shunt, as well as larger 73 class shunters 7322, 7333 and 7334 with X209, 7322 and 7334 painted in a blue and off white scheme with CRT Group logos.

CRT Group also introduced the first CargoSprinter to Australia in February 2002. Built by Windhoff in Germany this Diesel Multiple Unit consists of two driving and power units, each fitted with a full-width cab and two Volvo truck engines for propulsion, which operate in a push pull mode, with up to seven trailers in between. The radio communication system in the CargoSprinter is based around a computer running the Linux operating system, with application software written using C, Phoenix and Pascal (Kylix). Original specification CargoSprinter's used USB connections between electronics modules, second generation machines used TCP/IP across a LAN. After a number of promotional trips, the CargoSprinter operated a tri-weekly service from Melbourne to Wodonga in 2003, followed by a port shuttle from the Port of Melbourne to Altona North from 1 September that year.

The company also owned over 2000 low profile 30 feet (9.1 m) silver shipping containers that were used on their own services.

Linehaul of freight between CRT Group terminals was contracted to outside railway operators. In the early 2000s Freight Australia was contracted to move freight between Melbourne and Sydney. The contract contained a clause that if Freight Australia was acquired by a competitor of CRT Group, 10,000 hp (7,500 kW) of locomotive power (calculated by the business CRT Group was offering Freight Australia) was to be transferred to CRT Group. As a result, when Freight Australia was acquired by Pacific National in 2004, X53, X54, G516 and G534 were transferred to CRT. After this date linehaul of CRT freight passed to QR National along with the four Freight Australia locomotives, who also operated Melbourne to Brisbane services for the company.

== QR National purchase ==
In June 2005, QR National acquired CRT Group. A revised corporate image was unveiled in August 2008.

== Qube Logistics purchase ==
In August 2014, Qube Logistics entered an agreement to purchase the business from Aurizon. It was completed in December 2014 after the Australian Competition & Consumer Commission approved the sale.
