= New South Wales 73 class locomotive =

1970–73 Australian diesel-hydraulic class

New South Wales 73 class
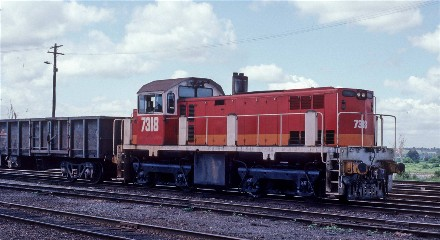
- Candy coloured 7318 shunts Grafton yard in January 1986
Type and origin
- Power type: Diesel-hydraulic
- Builder: Walkers Limited, Maryborough
- Model: G.H. 700
- Build date: 1970–1973
- Total produced: 50
Specifications
- Configuration
  - AAR: B-B
  - UIC: B'B'
- Gauge: 4 ft 8 1/2 in (1,435 mm) standard gauge
- Wheel diameter: 40 in (1,016 mm)
- Wheelbase: 26 ft 6 in (8.08 m)
- Length: Over headstocks: 36 ft 0 in (10.97 m), Over buffers: 39 ft 4 in (11.99 m)
- Width: 9 ft 3 in (2.82 m)
- Height: 13 ft 6 in (4.11 m)
- Axle load: 12 long tons 5 cwt (27,400 lb or 12.4 t)
- Loco weight: 49 long tons 0 cwt (109,800 lb or 49.8 t)
- Fuel type: Diesel
- Fuel capacity: 500 imp gal (2,300 L; 600 US gal)
- Lubricant cap.: Engine: 42 imp gal (190 L; 50 US gal), Transmission: 58 imp gal (260 L; 70 US gal), Final drive: 3.25 imp gal (14.8 L; 3.90 US gal)
- Coolant cap.: 80 imp gal (360 L; 96 US gal)
- Sandbox cap.: 10 cu ft (0.28 m^{3})
- Prime mover: Caterpillar D379 series B
- RPM range: 550–1400
- Engine type: Four-stroke V8 diesel
- Aspiration: Turbocharged
- Cylinders: 8
- Cylinder size: 6.25 in × 8 in (159 mm × 203 mm)
- Transmission: Voith L4r4U2, with Gmeinder Type GM170/EHA/469 and GM170/E/327B final drives
Performance figures
- Maximum speed: 40 mph (64 km/h)
- Power output: Gross: 700 hp (522 kW), For traction: 650 hp (485 kW)
- Tractive effort: Continuous: 25,000 lbf (111.21 kN) at 5.4 mph (8.69 km/h)
Career
- Operators: NSW Department of Railways
- Number in class: 50
- Numbers: 7301–7350
- First run: 5 October 1970
- Preserved: 7307, 7320, 7321, 7324, 7329, 7335, 7344, 7350
- Current owner: Invicta Sucrogen; Mackay Sugar; Plane Creek Sucrogen; Proserpine Mill
- Disposition: 15 in service, 8 preserved, 16 stored, 11 scrapped

The 73 class is an Australian diesel-hydraulic locomotive built by Walkers Limited, Maryborough for the New South Wales Department of Railways between 1970 and 1973.

== History ==
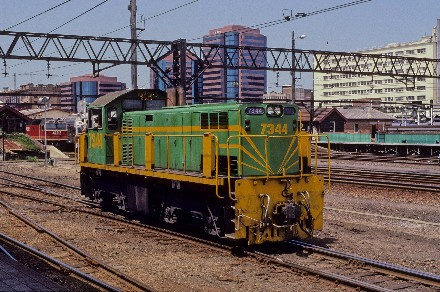
7344 shunts at Sydney Central in October 1991 painted in experimental FreightCorp green livery

The New South Wales Department of Railways placed an order in October 1969 with Walkers Limited, Maryborough for 20 B-B shunting locomotives. These were the only New South Wales locomotives to be built in Queensland.

== Delivery ==
The first unit was delivered in October 1970. When the whole of the first order had arrived, all steam shunting on the North Coast line and the Sydney Metropolitan area, as well as at Goulburn had been replaced. In July 1971 a further 30 units were ordered. The last of these arrived in March 1973 and this brought to an end all remaining steam shunting operations in New South Wales.

== In traffic ==
The New South Wales Department of Railways purchased the class mainly for shunting and their prohibition from mainline use was 'officially' due to the lack of vigilance controls. However, despite its absence, the class was still seen on many suburban trip workings and when mainline operation was a necessity, there seemed to be no hesitation to use them.

One advantage a diesel-hydraulic locomotive has over a diesel-electric variety is its ability to negotiate up to 300mm of water over the tracks. Big floods in March 1976 gave 7323 an opportunity to show off its swimming ability when water covered the line near Bourke and this locomotive was used on a couple of freight trains and a ballast train from Nyngan to Bourke and return. At least two other occasions when their water resistance was put to use were Menindee in 1976 and Hexham in 1977.

Multiple unit operation was common, although the flood event at Hexham is the only known occurrence of triple-heading. A number of units were fitted with exhaust gas scrubbers for use on Eastern Suburbs Railway construction in the 1970s.

== Depot allocation ==
As an example of the spread of the members of the class throughout the system, the fleet was allocated as follows as at 30 August 1977:

Depot	Allocation
Eveleigh	7301–7314, 7317, 7321, 7339–7345
Goulburn	7315, 7316
Cootamundra	7319
Junee	7320 (actually working at Albury)
Lithgow	7326
Orange	7322
Dubbo	7323, 7324
Parkes	7325
Broadmeadow	7327–7338
South Grafton	7318
Werris Creek	7346 (actually working at West Tamworth), 7347
Yeerongpilly	7348–7350

== Withdrawal ==
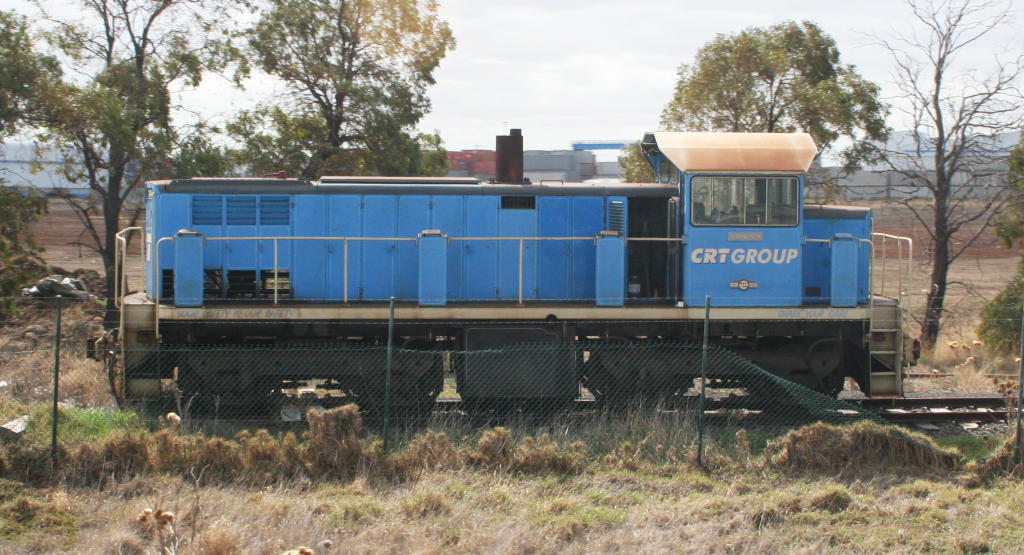
CRT Group shunter 7334 at the Altona terminal in 2007

With a reduction in locomotive hauled passenger trains and the closure of a number of yards, withdrawals began in February 1987. By October 1991 only three remained in service with SRA FreightRail. One was repainted into CountryLink livery for use as a depot shunter at the XPT Service Centre.

Disposals commenced in 1990 with three sold to the Canberra Railway Museum. Four were sold to the Manildra Group in 1991. Many were sold to Queensland sugar cane companies for conversion to 610 mm (2 ft) gauge. A number have also been preserved.

7301 & 7344 were placed on RailCorp's Heritage & Conservation Register. 7301 was subsequently scrapped in January 2014.

=== Preserved ===
The following are held by recognised preservation organisations:

- 7307 & 7321: Owned by the Oberon Tarana Heritage Railway, both in Patrick Portlink red and yellow livery
- 7320 & 7324: Privately owned, currently stored in Canberra
- 7329 & 7335: Owned by the Dorrigo Steam Railway & Museum
- 7344: Owned by Transport Heritage NSW, formerly in the custody of 3801 Limited (now East Coast Heritage Rail) until 2017 and from December 2018 is in the custody of the Rail Motor Society and is based at its Paterson Depot. The unit was repainted in the original Indian Red livery in 2020. Vigilance control and an ICE train radio have been fitted and it has also been refitted with buffers to facilitate the Society's main line operations.
- 7350: Owned by Transport Heritage NSW, semi operational at the NSW Rail Museum.

=== Sold ===
The following units were sold for further commercial operation, some being converted to 610 mm (2 ft):

- 7304, 7306, 7308 & 7341: all stored in original condition at the former North Eton Mill shed and owned by the Mackay Sugar Limited
- 7305, 7328, 7330 & 7331: all rebuilt and operational at Farleigh Mill
- 7309, 7336 & 7347: all stored in original condition at Kalamia Mill, Ayr
- 7310, 7318, 7325, 7346 & 7348: all rebuilt and operational at Invicta Mill
- 7313: rebuilt and operational at Pleystowe Mill
- 7314 & 7339: both rebuilt and operational at Proserpine Mill
- 7315: restored and operational at Shoalhaven Starches before being partially dismantled. Stored derelict in starch mill wagon repair sidings until 2021 when the repair siding was removed and relocated. Stored derelict goods on road #2 of Bomaderry station until removed in 2022. Current owner unknown, now stored on private property in Goulburn. Bomaderry Formerly owned by the Manildra Group ex Canberra Railway Museum
- 7317: rebuilt and operational at Plane Creek Mill
- 7327 & 7332: both stored in derelict condition at Mackay Sugar Co-op
- 7337 & 7343: both rebuilt and operational at Marian Mill
- 7340: restored and operational at Narranderra Mill, owned by the Manildra Group
- 7349: stored in original form at Pioneer Mill, Brandon
- 7322 & 7333: both stored and are now owned by the Manildra Group both ex CRT Group
- 7319, 7322 & 7333: have been purchased by a local company in Goulburn and are currently stored in the Goulburn Locomotive Depot, with 7333 being restored to operating condition inside the roundhouse.
- 7334: is for sale in 2018.

== See also ==
- Queensland Railways DH class
- Victorian Railways Y class (diesel)
