= EMD SW1001 =

Model of 1000 hp American diesel switcher

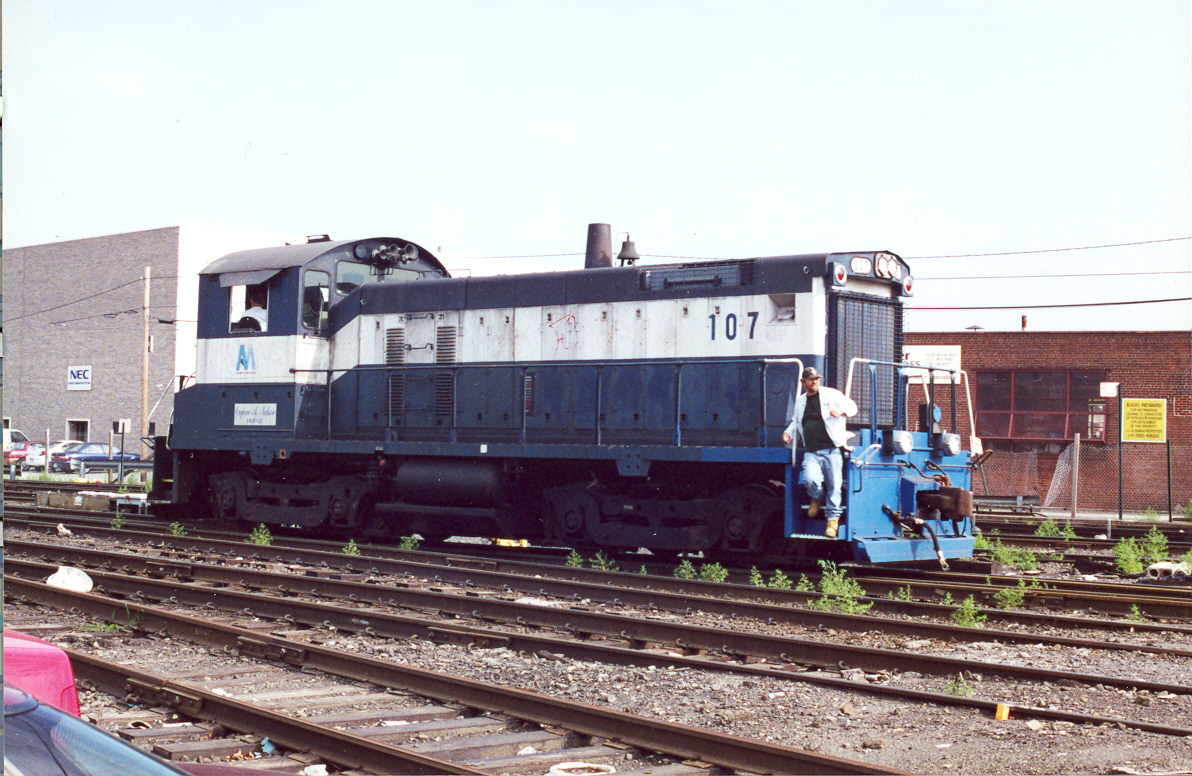
- LIRR Number 107 in operation.
Type and origin
- Power type: Diesel-electric
- Builder: General Motors Electro-Motive Division
- Model: SW1001
- Build date: September 1968 – June 1986
- Total produced: 230
Specifications
- Configuration
  - AAR: B-B
- Gauge: 4 ft 8 1/2 in (1,435 mm) standard gauge
- Prime mover: EMD 645E
- Engine type: V8 Diesel engine
- Cylinders: 8
Performance figures
- Power output: 1,000 hp (750 kW)
Career
- Locale: US (152), Canada (4), Guinea (5), Korea (28), Mexico (17), Morocco (18), Saudi Arabia (5), UK (1)

The EMD SW1001 is a 1,000-horsepower (750 kW) diesel switcher locomotive built by General Motors' Electro-Motive Division between September 1968 and June 1986. A total of 230 were constructed, mainly for North American railroads and industrial operations.

The SW1001 was developed because EMD's SW1000 model had proved unpopular among industrial railroad customers, as the heights of its walkway and cab eaves were much greater than those of earlier EMD switcher models. The overall height was similar, but the SW1000's roof was much flatter in curvature. Industrial railroads that only operated switchers often had facilities designed to the proportions of EMD's earlier switchers.

The SW1001, in essence, placed the hood and powertrain of the SW1000 with the underframe and cab of the earlier SW1200. The EMD 645-series diesel engine had a deeper crankcase and oil pan than the SW1200's EMD 567-series engine. The engine had to be mounted on risers for sufficient clearance, raising the whole hood about 6 in (152 mm) above the walkway compared to the SW1000, and requiring a spacer under the hood. The cab was similar to that of the SW1200, but not identical; it is longer, and has a different window arrangement. The SW1001 uses the same pilot plates as the SW1000; given the lower frame height, these protrude above the walkway deck height, giving the most obvious SW1001 spotting feature.

== Export models ==
The SW1001 locomotive type was used in a number of countries outside the USA: in the Americas four units were bought by Canadian businesses; two by Saskatchewan Power and two by the National Harbours Board. 18 by companies in Mexico: 12 by AHMSA, 3 by Lazaro Cardenas Steel (ArcelorMittal), and 3 by Pemex.

In Africa five were supplied to the Boke project in Guinea in the early 1970s and 18 were acquired by the railways of Morocco (ONCF) in 1982 as type DI 500. In Asia the Korean National Railway acquired 28 between 1969 and 1971.

One was acquired in 1980 by Foster Yeoman (vehicle code Y44), and another by Hanson Aggregates in 2000 both for use on quarry industrial sites in the England. They are based at Whatley Quarry and Merehead Quarry, both part of Mendip Rail operations.

Five were bought for the government railways of Saudi Arabia in 1981.

Additionally 60 variants with a redesigned cab were built under license as the Renfe Class 310 for the railways of Spain between 1989 and 1991.

== EMD ==
Railroad	Quantity	Road numbers	Date Built
Alabama By-Products Corporation	1	1000	8/1971
Aliquippa & Southern	3	1000-1002	2/1973-3/1975
American Steel Foundries	2	9G9-9G10	6/1979-7/1979
Amoco Oil	1	SE3	12/1978
Armco Steel	24	E150-E169, 1-18-38-1-18-40, 1215	10/1974-6/1982
Birmingham Southern	8	18-19, 220-225	5/1973-10/1974
Champion International	1	06056	7/1979
Chicago Short Line	2	28-29	9/1974
Coors Brewing	1	C998	12/1980
Corinth & Counce Railroad	3	1003-1005	10/1974-5/1981
Cuyahoga Valley	1	1051	2/1973
Detroit Edison	1	217	9/1968
Dow Chemical	5	1001-1003, 1008-1009	12/1980-4/1981
East Cooper & Berkeley	2	2001-2002	12/1977
Electro-Motive (Demonstrator)	1	117	12/1979
Elgin, Joliet & Eastern Railway	2	444-445	8/1971
Ford Motor Company	10	10014-10023	10/1968-12/1975
Galveston Wharves	5	301-305	10/1975-7/1980
General Motors, Central Foundry Division	1	1971	8/1971
General Motors, Chevrolet Motor Division	1	96	5/1972
Indianapolis Power & Light	1	No Number	3/1982
Inland Steel	2	126-127	3/1976
Interlake Steel	2	17-18	10/1974-11/1974
Intermountain Power	1	1	4/1985
Lake Terminal Railroad	1	1021	10/1968
Long Island Railroad	8	100-107	3/1977
Monongahela Connecting Railroad	6	420-425	2/1970-3/1976
New Haven Trap Rock	1	7357	7/1976
Newburgh & South Shore	5	1018-1022	2/1970-4/1975
Northwestern Steel & Wire	3	2-4	5/1981
Olin Corporation	1	1	6/1982
Public Service Company of Colorado	1	15-1	11/1973
Reading Company	15	2601-2615	11/1973-12/1973
River Terminal Railway	8	101-108	9/1968-12/1978
St Joseph Minerals Company	1	1004	8/1974
Savannah State Docks	2	1001-1002	4/1978
South Carolina Public Railways	1	1001	4-1975
Texas Company	1	24	1/1976
U.S. Steel, Gary Works	3	88-90	3/1970-1/1971
Union Railroad	3	101-103	3/1976
Total Built	142		

== GMD ==
Railroad	Quantity	Road numbers	Date Built
National Harbours Board	2	7601-7602	7/1976
Saskatchewan Power	2	1001-1002	11/1978
Total Built	4		

== Export ==
Railroad	Quantity	Road numbers	Date Built
Altos Hornos (Mexico)	12	142, 151-156, 159-161, 164-165	8/1974-12/1980
Boke Project (Guinea)	5	201-205	3/1972-10/1974
Foster Yeoman (Great Britain)	1	44	12/1980
Korean National Railroad (Korea)	28	2101-2128	3/1969-1/1971
Lazaro Cardenas Steel (Mexico)	1	No Number	1/1976
Mexican Petroleum (Mexico)	3	5, 24-25	8/1980-6/1986, Units 24-25 were built in 8/1980, Unit No. 5 was built in 6/1986.
Moroccan Railways (Morocco)	18	DI501-DI518	10/1982-9/1984
Saudi Government Railways (Saudi Arabia)	5	1022-1026	11/1981
Total Built	73		

== See also ==
- List of GM-EMD locomotives
