= GA DE900 locomotives =

GA DE900
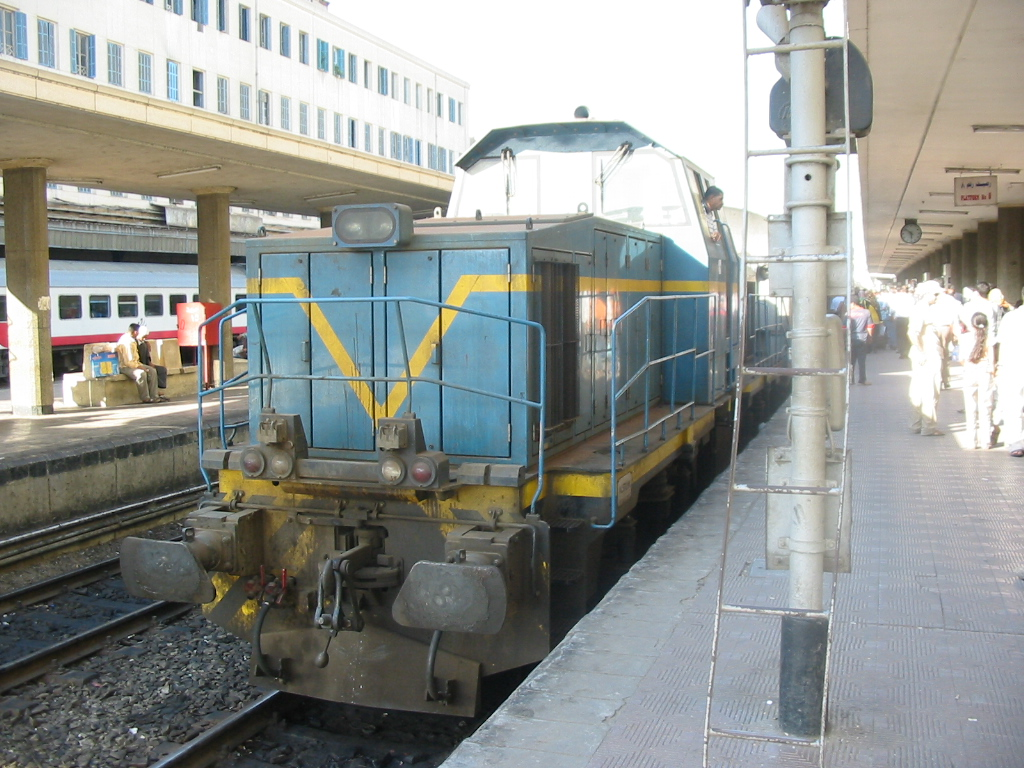
- Egyptian Railway GA DE 900
Type and origin
- Power type: Diesel
- Builder: Meinfesa / Alstom
- Build date: 1994-2000
- Total produced: 75
Specifications
- Configuration
  - UIC: Bo-Bo
- Gauge: 1,435 mm (4 ft 8 1/2 in)
- Loco weight: 72-74 tonnes
- Engine type: MTU 8V396TB14
- Displacement: 185 mm (7.3 in) (stroke)
- Cylinders: 8 (V formation)
- Cylinder size: 165 mm (6.5 in) (diameter)
- Transmission: AC electrical
- Train brakes: Electropneumatic
Performance figures
- Maximum speed: 80 km/h (50 mph)
- Power output: 900 kW (1,200 hp)
Career
- Operators: Egyptian National Railways, Israel Railways, GEO RAILMEX, Swiss Federal Railways

The GA DE900 is a family of 4 axle Bo'Bo' diesel electric locomotives manufactured in Spain, by Meinfesa.

The class derive from the RENFE Class 311 type locomotive developed by MTM, Ateinsa and Babcock & Wilcox.

== Operators ==
=== Israel ===
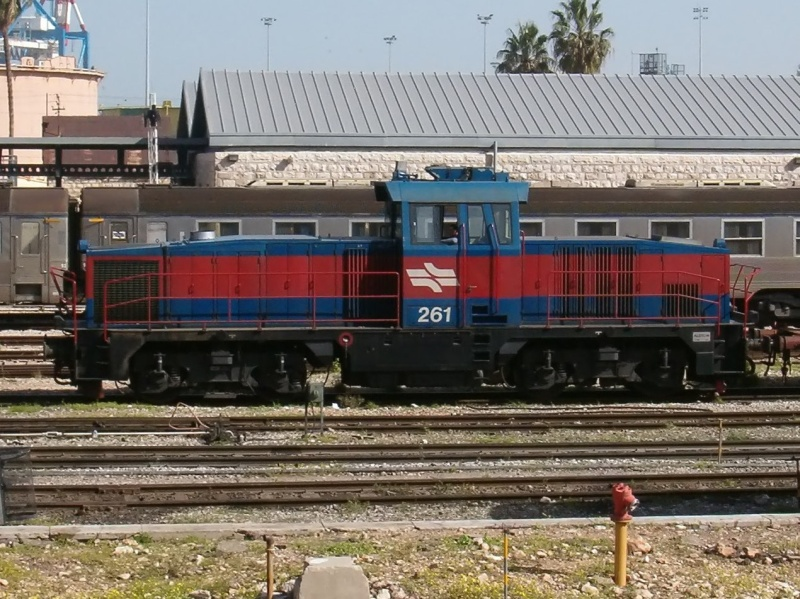
GA-DE 900 AC of Israel Railways

Three locomotives were manufactured for the Israel state railways (IR) in 1997.

=== Switzerland ===
Forty locomotives classified as SBB Am841 were produced for the state railways of Switzerland in 1994)

=== Mexico ===
Two locomotives were manufactured for GEO RAILMEX of Mexico in 1997.

=== Egypt ===
The Egyptian National Railways ordered 30 similar locomotives of type GA-DE 900 AC in 2000.
