= Windhoff =

German manufacturing company

- Founded: 1889
- Founder: Rudolf Windhoff
- Parent: Georgsmarienhütte Holding GmbH (2002–present)
- Website: www.windhoff.com

Windhoff is a German manufacturer of specialised railways rolling stock, and heavy industrial plant. The company was founded in 1889.

The company is well known for its CargoSprinter rail vehicle, and derivatives.

== History ==
The company started out as the Rheiner Maschinenfabrik (Machine Factory of Rheine) in Rheine near Münster, Germany in 1889 manufacturing machines for the weaving industry and founded by Rudolf Windhoff. By 1901 the company was employing over 100 people.

As similar control mechanisms were used for steam-driven automated weaving looms and for stream-driven railway traversers and turntables, Rudolf Windhoff also founded the Motoren- und Fahrzeugfabrik Gebr. Windhoff (Windhoff Brothers' Engine and Vehicle Factory).

In 1913, these two private companies were combined to form the share-based Rheiner Maschinenfabrik Windhoff (Windhoff Machine Factory Rheine). This combined company suffered losses during the 1930s. Later, a bomb destroyed the manufacturing premises on 5 October 1944. In 1957 the company stopped manufacturing normal locomotives and start to concentrate on tracking machines (ballast tampers).

The Windhoff company was first listed on the stock exchange in 1993. On 19 December 2001, the main company was declared bankrupt and the industrial plant and railway engineering divisions being taken over on 1 March 2002, to become part of Georgsmarienhütte Holdings GmbH. The Windhoff division, as Windhoff Bahn- und Anlagentechnik GmbH (Windhoff Railway- and Equipment Technology) continues to supply specialist railway vehicles and infrastructure with a team of around 250 people. The company is an approved railway contractor for in the United Kingdom, Sweden and Norway.

== Products ==
Windhoff manufactures specialised rail vehicles including the diesel freight multiple unit the CargoSprinter, and the Windhoff MPV, used for infrastructure and service trains, as well as electric and diesel shunting machines, shunting locomotives, and stationary shunting equipment. The company also manufactures a wide variety of rail service equipment including lifting equipment, traversers and turntables and equipment for wheelset maintenance including wheel and bogie drop machines, and wheelset and bogie measuring equipment.

Windhoff has a contract to supply Network Rail with a factory train which will be used by Amey plc in the Great Western electrification project.

The company also manufactures equipment for heavy industrial plants, including steel-works equipment such as ladle transporters and tippers, torpedo wagons (in association with IAG-MAGNUM), and machinery for steel coil handling.
