= Renfe Class 309 =

Renfe 309
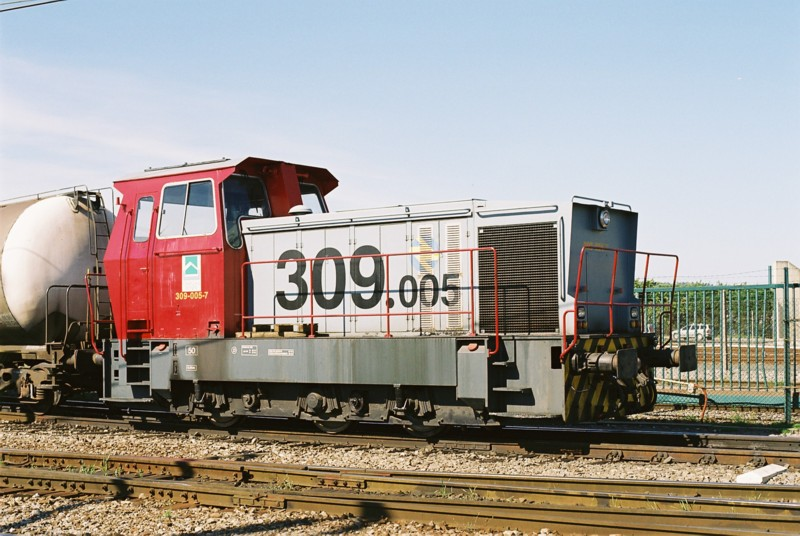
- 309005 in October 2005
Type and origin
- Power type: Diesel–hydraulic
- Builder: M.T.M (Maquinista Terrestre y Maritima)
- Model: DH-700
- Build date: 1986–1987
- Total produced: 20
Specifications
- Configuration
  - UIC: C
- Gauge: 1,668 mm (5 ft 5 21/32 in)
- Wheel diameter: 1,000 mm (39.37 in) (new)
- Length: 9.960 m (32 ft 8.1 in)
- Width: 3.200 m (10 ft 5.98 in)
- Height: 4.210 m (13 ft 9.75 in)
- Loco weight: 54 t (53 long tons; 60 short tons)
- Prime mover: MTU, built under license by Empresa Nacional Bazán
- Engine type: Four-stroke diesel
- Cylinders: V6
- Transmission: Hydraulic Voith L3r4U2
- Loco brake: Pneumatic, hydrodynamic(?)
Performance figures
- Maximum speed: 50 km/h (31 mph)
- Power output: 385 kW (516 hp)
- Tractive effort: 177 kN (40,000 lb_{f})
Career
- Operators: Renfe
- Locale: Spain

The Renfe Class 309 is a class of 20 three axle diesel–hydraulic locomotives shunters built by M.T.M. for Renfe, and introduced between 1986–7.

== History and design ==
In the late 1970s Renfe began planning to modernise its shunting locomotives; initially modernisation of the Class 303 with new engines was considered and one locomotive converted, but the experiment was not carried forward. In 1982 Renfe opened bidding for a contract for 50 locomotives of up to 1,100 hp (820 kW). M.T.M. (Maquinista Terrestre y Marítima) offered its own development, and was successful: in July 1983 Renfe placed an order for 20 units.

The first units were delivered in the red-brown/yellow/white estrella livery in 1985 and were accepted into service in 1986 after correction of technical problems.

Initially the property of Renfe, after the creation of Adif the locomotives were divided between Mercancías (formerly Cargas freight) and Adif (infrastructure services). As of 2010 about half have been painted in a red and grey livery.
