= M250 series =

Japanese train type

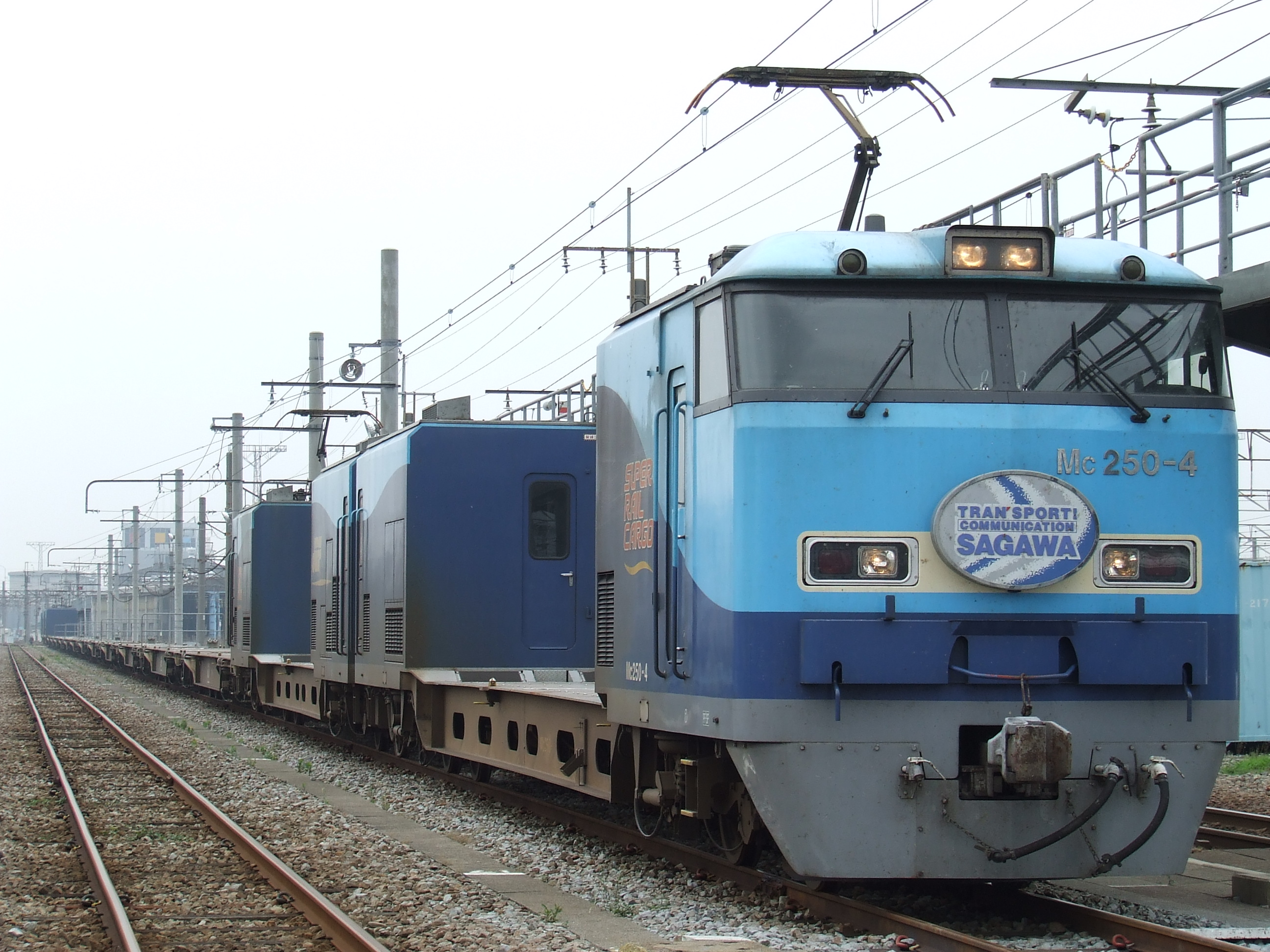
- An M250 series train in June 2007
- In service: 2004–present
- Manufacturers: Kawasaki Heavy Industries, Nippon Sharyo, Toshiba
- Constructed: 2002–2003
- Number built: 42 cars (2 full sets + spare cars)
- Formation: 16 cars per trainset
- Operator: JR Freight
- Depot: Ōi
- Line served: Tōkaidō Main Line

Specifications
- Car length: 20,300 mm (66 ft 7 1/4 in)
- Width: 2,800 mm (9 ft 2 1/4 in)
- Maximum speed: 130 km/h (81 mph)
- Traction system: Variable frequency (3-level IGBT)
- Power output: 220 kW (295 hp) x 16 = 3,520 kW (4,720 hp)
- Deceleration: 5.2 km/(h⋅s) (3.2 mph/s)
- Electric systems: 1,500 V DC overhead line
- Current collection: FPS130 single-arm pantograph
- Safety systems: ATS-SF, ATS-PF
- Track gauge: 1,067 mm (3 ft 6 in)

Notes/references
- This train won the 48th Blue Ribbon Award in 2005.

The M250 series (M250系, M250-kei), branded "Super Rail Cargo", is a freight electric multiple unit (EMU) train type operated by Japan Freight Railway (JR Freight) in Japan. It entered service in 2004 with the objective of reducing emissions and carrying general freight for small package forwarders (such as special delivery services). The M250 series is JR Freight's first container train with distributed traction. It is manufactured by Nippon Sharyo, Kawasaki Heavy Industries, and Toshiba.

== Background ==
In 2004, freight trains between Tokyo and Osaka on the Tokaido Main Line carried about 2.8 million tons of freight, which is 13% of the total annual transportation volume of JR Freight. However, because trucks are required for transporting goods between the customer and the station, trains are often not competitive for transporting small amounts of goods over medium distances.

However, JR Freight has been making efforts to shift freight transport from road to rail, and in 1999 it began to consider specializing in small-lot freight transportation. At that time, the fastest locomotive-hauled freight trains connected Tokyo and Osaka in 6 hours and 40 minutes, which did not meet the demands of courier freight carriers. Therefore, JR Freight aimed to reduce the time on that route to about 6 hours.

As a result of these considerations, a plan to increase speeds of freight trains was announced. This plan proposed using distributed power to increase acceleration and deceleration as well as reduce axle loads. It also aimed to accelerate transfers of intermodal containers. To ensure safety and reliability, principles already in use for passenger transport were to be used wherever possible.

The M250 series was developed and designed according to this policy.

== Vehicle description ==
This section describes the specifications at the time of the train's appearance.

=== Formation ===
The M250 series is a 16-car train consisting of four different types of vehicles. In the M250 designation, "M" stands for "multiple unit", the leading "2" designates a vehicle using induction motors for direct current lines, and the "50" means that this vehicle has a maximum speed of over 110km/h.

==== Mc250 ====
This Driving power car is used at both ends of the train and can carry one 31-foot container. The vehicle mass is 38.5t when empty and 50t when fully loaded.

==== M251 ====
This power car can also carry one 31-foot container. The vehicle mass is 38.5t when empty and 50t when fully loaded.

==== T260 ====
This trailer is equipped with a train monitoring system. It can carry two 31-foot containers. The vehicle mass is 21t when empty and 40t when fully loaded.

==== T261 ====
This trailer is not equipped with a train monitoring system. Its mass and capacity are identical to that of the T260.

A complete train is formed from two sets of a Mc250 and a M251 each at the ends of the train, with six sets of one T260 and one T261 trailer each in between.

=== Body ===
In parcel delivery, loads have relatively low mass in relation to its volume. In order to increase the available space for the containers as much as possible, the height of the vehicle frame had to be kept to 1,000mm above the top of the rails. On the other hand, there needed to be sufficient room for the traction motors and gears, which were adapted from other vehicles. Therefore, the powered vehicles have their frame at 1,103mm above the top of the rails at the ends, and at 1,000mm in the central section of the vehicle. The trailers have their frame at 1,000mm above the top of rail over their entire length.

The electric vehicles have crew and equipment rooms above the bogies at both ends. The front windows are as large as possible to ensure optimal visibility. These rooms have doors on the left and right sides, and a gangway connects the power cars. On the T260 trailers, ladders and handrails are provided at the end of the vehicle.

=== Cab ===
For the first time in a JR Freight vehicle, brake and power are controlled by a single lever on the left-hand side.

The M250 series is equipped with a monitoring device which allows monitoring the state of the vehicle and various equipment. The central device for this system is mounted on the Mc250 cars at the end of the train, and slave units are installed on the M251 motor cars and the T260 trailers. The T260 trailer's unit is also responsible for monitoring the T261 trailer adjacent to it. Information gathered by this system is shown on a display in the cab. When a failure occurs, the details and appropriate actions are shown on the same display, and the vehicle state is recorded so it can be analyzed later.

=== Drive system ===
The main motors are FMT130-type squirrel cage rotor asynchronous motors rated for 220kW each, one of which is installed on each axle of the motor cars.

Each motor is controlled by one VVVF inverter built by Toshiba. The gear ratio is 97:16, or 6.06.

=== Other equipment ===
A FPS130 single-arm pantograph is installed on each electric vehicle. They are installed at the front of the Mc250 vehicle, and at the rear of the M251 vehicle, to ensure to biggest possible distance between them.

An automatic coupler is installed on the Mc251 driving motor cars so the train can be towed by a regular locomotive.

== Operation ==
Sagawa Express began operating one train as a reserved "Special high speed freight train" between Tokyo Freight Terminal and Ajikawaguchi Station (Osaka) on 13 March 2004. The containers are owned by Sagawa Galaxy Highways. Running with increasing frequency, it later became a regularly scheduled train (but with service suspended on Sundays and holidays).

== Awards ==
The M250 series won the 2004 Minister of Land, Infrastructure and Transportation Eco-Products award for Eco-Service and the 2005 Japan Railfan Club Blue Ribbon Award, making it the first non-passenger vehicle to win since the JNR Class EF66 in 1969.

== See also ==
- CargoSprinter, a German freight diesel multiple unit
