= Windhoff CargoSprinter =

Freight multiple unit

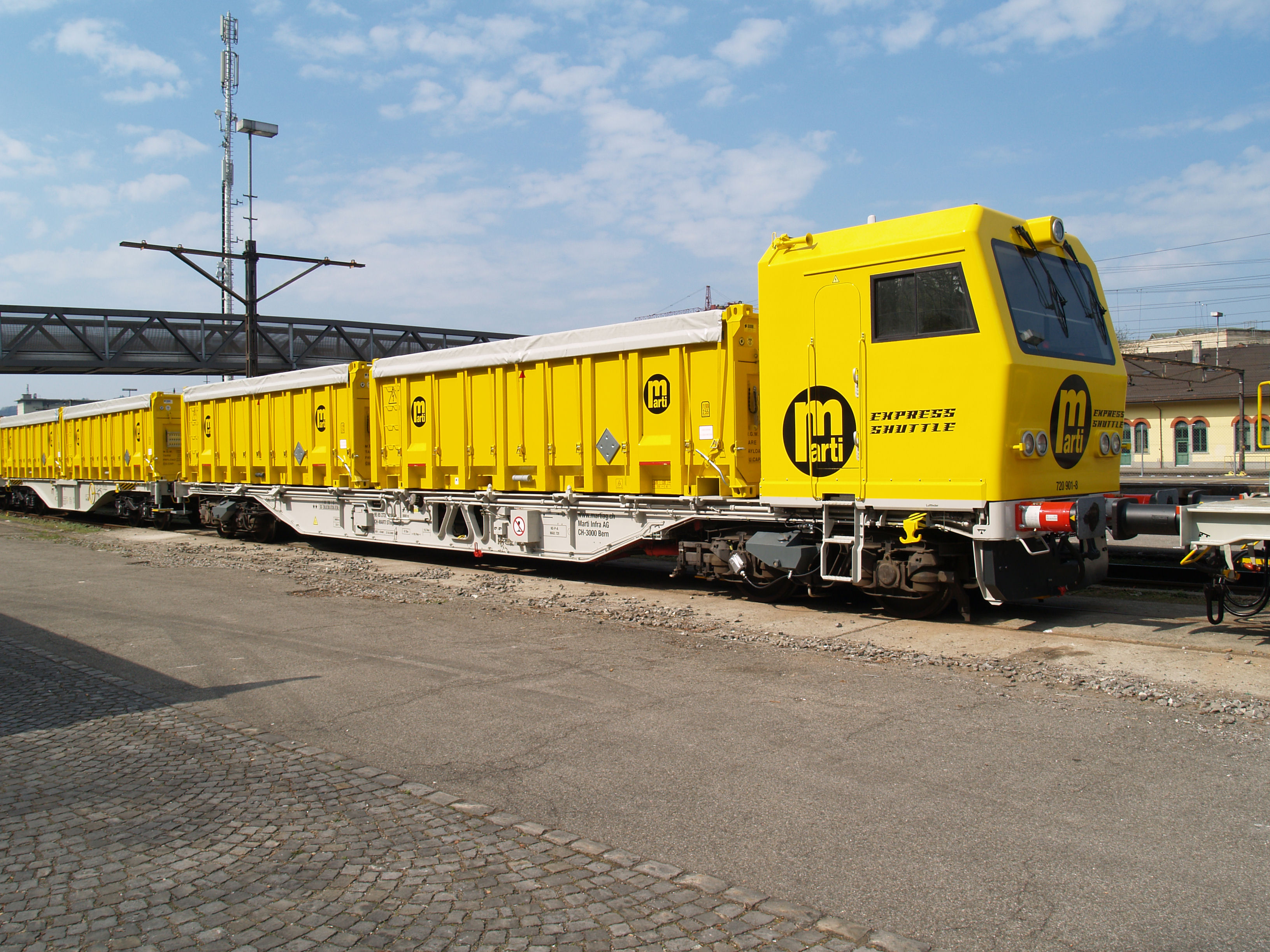
- Modified Talbot vehicle for the Marti Express Shuttle (Switzerland)
- Manufacturers: Windhoff also Waggonfabrik Talbot
- Constructed: 1996–present

The Windhoff CargoSprinter is a freight diesel multiple unit designed to transport freight or equipment, designed by German manufacturer Windhoff in the mid-1990s.

Initially seven vehicles were built for Deutsche Bahn. Four were built by Windhoff and had the reporting code DB class 690. Another three closely similar units were built by Waggonfabrik Talbot ('Talbot Talion') and given the reporting code DB class 691. The design did not lead to further freight work, several of the trains were later converted for other uses including tunnel rescue trains.

A variant for infrastructure and service trains, named the Multi Purpose Vehicle has been sold in a number of countries, mainly for use by rail infrastructure companies. These include:

- the United Kingdom (Railtrack, a track maintenance and specialised overhead electrification train),
- Switzerland (specialised tunnel rescue and firefighting version), and
- the Netherlands and Taiwan (maintenance of high speed lines).

== History and design ==
The CargoSprinter was developed in 1996 by Windhoff in association with freight operators DB Cargo and Fraport. The concept was for a self powered container carrying freight train, with a relatively high top speed enabling it to operate without disrupting passenger services. The train was a five-car permanently connected set of container-carrying vehicles (capacity ~10TEU), with driving cab at each end (motorised with underfloor engines), and capable of being easily connected and worked in multiple with other CargoSprinter trains. The original designs were taken from concept stage to production in 12 months.

The new concept was optimistically received as offering a step change in rail freight transportation, allowing rapid efficient transport of less than trainload and shortline freight, 7 vehicles were initially built (1997) for trials with Deutsche Bahn. In practice the CargoSprinter concept was not a success as a commercial freight vehicle, trials of the vehicles did not lead to regular work. Ex-freight trial vehicles later found use modified for specialised roles, such as tunnel rescue, and hybrid powered freight trains.

The design was more successful as an infrastructure and services train: in 1998 Windhoff received a 57DM million order from Railtrack (UK) for 25 trains derived from the CargoSprinter type, named Multi-purpose vehicles (MPVs), developed in association with AMEC Rail; the trains were to be used for infrastructure maintenance including rail deicing, and railhead treatment, 7 more sets were acquired in 2000.

In 2002 the CargoSprinter train was used as the mechanical basis of the CargoMover automated freight wagon concept developed by Siemens.

Other specialised designs based on the Windhoff MPV include a dedicated fire fighting and tunnel rescue trains (Switzerland; 2003, Austria; 2004), and railway overhead electrification factory trains for both wire renewal, and overhead line construction. (UK; 2000, 2011)

MPV vehicles are also in use by rail infrastructure companies in Taiwan (2007–) and the Netherlands (2007–).

== Build history and operators ==
=== Germany ===
Cargo Sprinter (DB class 690) Talion (DB Class 691)
- Manufacturers: DB 690: Windhoff; DB 691: Waggonfabrik Talbot
- Entered service: 1996–1997
- Number built: DB 690 : 3 DB 691 : 4

Specifications
- Train length: DB 690 : 90.360 m (296 ft 5.5 in); DB 691 : 89.570 m (293 ft 10.4 in)
- Car length: motor/control car DB 690 : 20.190 m (66 ft 2.9 in); DB 691 : 19.740 m (64 ft 9.2 in)
- Floor height: 1,130–1,180 mm (44.5–46.5 in)
- Maximum speed: 120 km/h (75 mph) with 112 t (110 long tons; 123 short tons) load
- Weight: DB 690 : 121 t (119 long tons; 133 short tons); DB 691 : 113 t (111 long tons; 125 short tons)
- Prime mover: four Volvo
- Engine type: Diesel
- Cylinder count: 6
- Power output: 265 kW (360 PS; 355 hp) @ 2,050 rpm
- Transmission: 5 speed mechanical transmission, with torque converter and retarder
- UIC classification: DB 690 : 1A'A1'+2+2+2+1A'A1'; DB 691 : 1A'A1'+2'(2')(2')2'+1A'A1'
- Braking systems: Disc, all axles
- Coupling system: Z-AK
- Multiple working: Yes
- Track gauge: 1,435 mm (4 ft 8 1/2 in) standard gauge 1,067 mm (3 ft 6 in) Queensland Rail

Three units were constructed by Windhoff, and four by Talbot, with the first unit operational in 1997; both were broadly similar in design with the same operating characteristics, the Talbot built vehicles (branded Talion) differed in having inner unpowered wagons articulated using jacobs bogies.

The CargoSprinter trains operated between the intermodal rail terminal Rail AirCargo Station at Frankfurt Airport, Hamburg, Osnabrück, and Hanover and between 1997 and 1999, carrying two trains per day: the equivalent of 5,000 lorry loads per year. The service was initially successful with high reliability and full utilisation; work on the connecting railway line in the second year of operation disrupted the service, causing loss of custom leading to the termination of the service.

From 2000 the units were out of service, one was used for the Siemens' CargoMover experimental freight vehicle which was displayed at Innotrans in 2002. The remaining vehicles were offered for sale in 2004, and acquired for use in Austria as tunnel rescue trains.

==== Technical description ====
Both variants of the design (DB 690 'CargoSprinter' and DB 691 'Talion') are five-car trains, with a control cabin at either end. The end cars are powered, with the inner axles individually driven by Volvo engines (6 cylinder, 265 kW (355 hp) @ 2,050 rpm, emissions to Euro stage II standards). The transmission system uses a (5-speed) mechanical gearbox with clutch, torque converter, and retarder. Fuel capacity is 700l. All the traction equipment is located below the cargo floor level.

The vehicles main frames are constructed from welded steel; there are two longitudinal support beams and several transverse members (example: Windhoff intermediate cars). The driving vehicle bogies have rubber primary suspension. The Windhoff unpowered vehicles use leaf spring primary suspension. the Talbot vehicles use rubber. All train axles have disc brakes. The vehicles are within the EBO G2 structure gauge.

The end cabs have air conditioning, and are heated using waste heat from the diesel engine cooling system; the cabins are isolated from frame vibrations by an air-suspension system. The cab control systems use electronic multifunction display, and joystick control. The trains are permanently coupled whilst in service, and can work in multiple forming consists of up to 630 m (2,066 ft 11 in) (7 trains, 35 cars) – the inter-trainset coupling is via a Z-AK type automatic coupler, which includes electrical connections for power and data.

Both Windhoff and Talbot trains are operationally compatible; differences between the versions include the electronic control systems, minor differences in dimension, and the wheel arrangement. The three intermediate unpowered vehicles in the Windhoff CargoSprinter are two axle wagons, the Talbot intermediate unpowered cars use two axle jacobs articulation between the wagons, and two axle bogies on the end wagons.

=== Austria ===
Unused ex-DB 690 and DB 691 units were sold to the Austrian Federal Railways in 2004, and converted to tunnel rescue trains (ÖBB X690).

=== Australia ===
CRT Group order CargoSprinter in 2001, and introduced the first CargoSprinter to Australia in 2002. The Australian CargoSprinters have similar technical characteristics as the original versions built for Deutsche Bahn: Push-pull operation, with 2 Volvo EU Tier II engines with 5 speed transmissions per powered end unit; a cargo capacity of 2 TEU per vehicle; all wheels disc braked; air suspended cabin with air conditioning; and the ability to work in multiple train-units; and a top speed of 120 km/h (75 mph).

Whilst CRT was acquired by Queensland Rail the CargoSprinter was retained as part of a private company by CRT director Colin Rees. In 2004 Colin Rees announced that a more powerful version of the design was being developed, with double the capacity.

=== Netherlands ===
In 2000 independent Dutch railway company Shortlines announced that it had placed a 5DM million order for CargoSprinter trains with Windoff, to operate a freight train for Philips between Eindhoven and Rotterdam. The use of CargoSprinters was cancelled due to time and cost issues relating to installing ATB safety system on the trains.

In 2007 Windhoff acquired a contract to supply two MPV vehicles were supplied to Infraspeed for infrastructure work on the HSL Zuid in the Netherlands. The design is powered by 390 kW (530 PS; 520 hp) engines, and has a top speed of 140 km/h (87 mph).

=== Norway ===
Jernbaneverket ordered 11 track and catenary maintenance vehicles in 2014, for delivery from 2016.

=== Switzerland ===
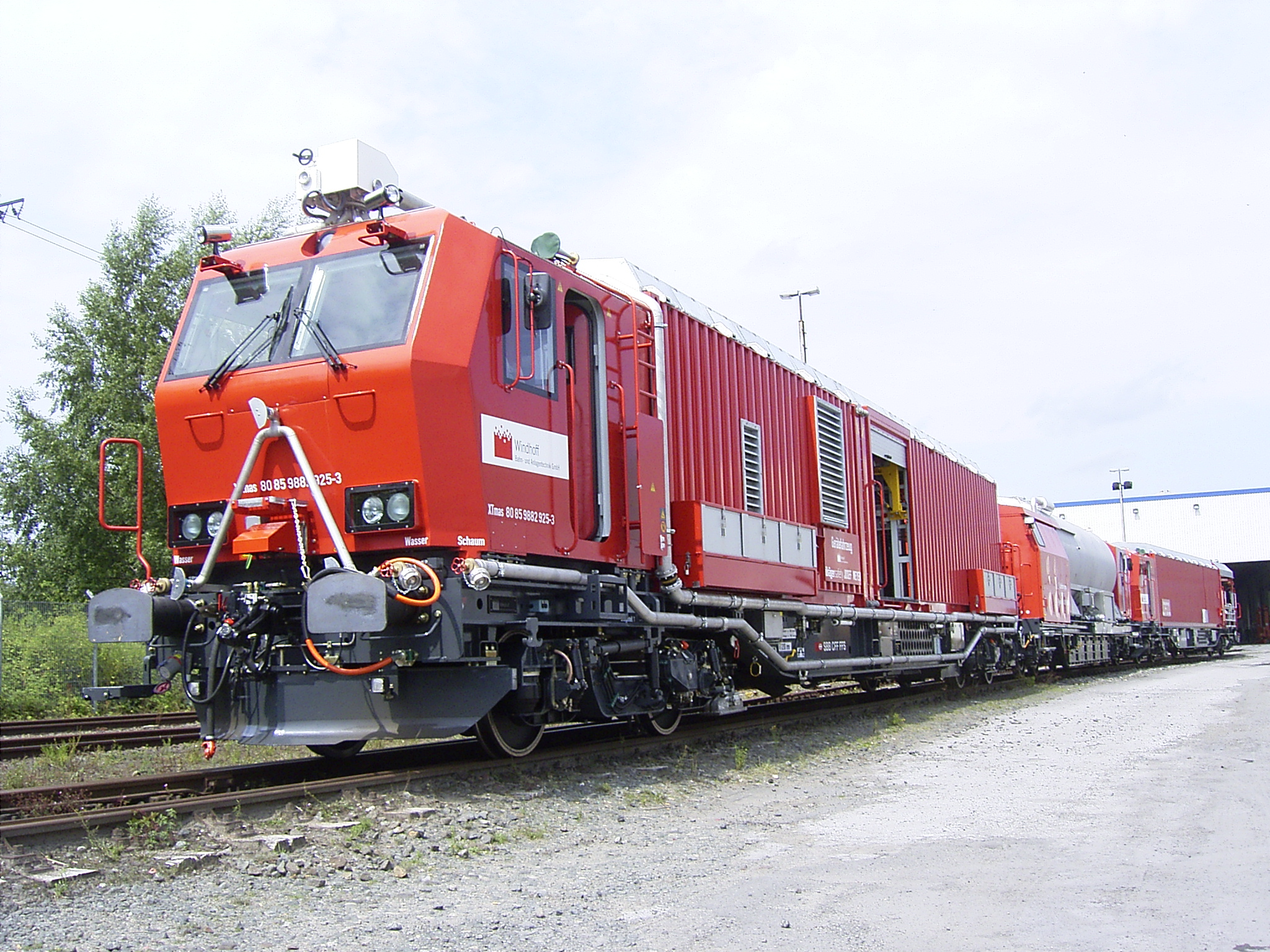
SBB fire fighting and tunnel rescue train

A fire-fighting train, the LRZ NT (Lösch- und Rettungszug Neue Technologie) was developed by Windhoff and partners (2003) for Swiss rail operators Bern-Lötschberg-Simplon (BLS) and Swiss Federal Railways (SBB-CFF-FFS) for initial use on the Lötschberg Base Tunnel. Windhoff supplied the basic train technology, derived from their MPV design. SBB acquired a three vehicle two engined train, whilst BLS acquired a four-vehicle, three-engined train (both with one unpowered vehicle). The SBB trains comprise one fire fighting vehicle, one non-powered vehicle with the water/foam supply and breathable air supply, and a rescue vehicle with space for 60 people. The BLS train has an additional rescue vehicle. Both versions are powered by MTU 6H1800 R80 type engines of 315 kW (428 PS; 422 hp) power.

In 2009 an ex-DB CargoSprinter (DB 691-502) machine was used as part of a new train design, named RailXpress – the design used a remote control modified CargoSprinter control car at one end as a control car and for shunting on non-electrified lines. At the other end of the train an electric locomotive (such as SBB Re 420) was used for mainline work, operating trains of 700 tonnes (689 long tons; 772 short tons) at up to 120 km/h (75 mph). A related design for transportation of construction materials (gravel) also began operation in 2009, named Marti Express Shuttle; the trains consist of a converted ex-DB (Talbot) driving vehicle, 8 intermediate four axle wagons, and an electric locomotive – the train has a carrying capacity of up to 540 tonnes (531 long tons; 595 short tons).

In 2012 SBB ordered 2 additional LRZs for the Gotthard Base Tunnel from a Windhoff / Dräger consortium.

In 2015 SBB ordered 35 track maintenance vehicles for delivery from 2017 to 2021.

In 2016 SBB ordered 3 additional LRZs from a Windhoff / Dräger consortium, for the CEVA line, Ceneri Base Tunnel, and the Lötschberg and Simplon Tunnels.

=== Taiwan ===
In 2007/8 Windhoff manufactured and supplied six MPV derived trains for infrastructure maintenance work on the Taiwan High Speed Rail line.

=== United Kingdom ===
In the United Kingdom, infrastructure operator Railtrack ordered 25 two-car units in 1998. The first 25 trainsets had only one driving car powered. An additional order for 7 more trainsets was placed in 2000 – these units had both end cars powered giving a top speed of 75 mph (121 km/h). The vehicles are used for weedkilling, de-icing, and water-jetting and sandite treatment of the railhead.

The MPV vehicles have also been proposed for use in revenue earning freight train services; ISO container transportation using a MPV power cars and conventional container wagons was experimentally trialled in 2000; containers were transported from the Port of Southampton to terminals in Birmingham and Barking. and technically successful trials with a two MPV power cars and 7 OTA two-axle timber wagons were carried out in 2005.

Two factory train for renewing overhead line equipment on the West Coast Mainline was ordered in 1999, and delivered in 2000. Each train-consist was made up of five separable autonomous units (four of which were single-ended MPVs); the entire train is fitted for multiple working allowing self powered transportation to a work site. In operation the train-consist splits into five sub-trains: the first unit is used to dismantle and recover previously installed wire; the second unit replaces catenary support wires ("droppers"), the third and fourth units install new wire and droppers, and the fifth unit is used for quality control – measuring and recording the new installation. To allow slow speed control the MPVs were fitted with hydrostatic drives. A Windhoff MPV was also used as the basis of a piling train – used to install catenary masts. The piling train including MPV mounted piling hammers (Fambo AB), and installation cranes (Hap, Palfinger).

In 2011 a specialised factory train for overhead line installation was ordered – the initial use of the train was expected to be the electrification of the Great Western Main Line (c.2013). The train, named the 'High Output Plant System' train was completed by late 2013. The entire train consisted of a 500 m (1,640 ft 5 in) 23 vehicles designed to be split into five separate working sections: two piling sets, one with a vibrating piler, the other with a percussion piler; a concrete mixing set; a structure erection set; and a catenary installation set.

In 2016, NI Railways had an MPV delivered to undertake sandite duties.

== See also ==
- M250 series, high speed electric multiple unit for containerised freight (Japan)
