= TransManche Link =

Defunct British-French construction consortium

TransManche Link (Cross Channel Link) or TML was a British-French construction consortium responsible for building the Channel Tunnel under the English Channel between Cheriton in England, and Coquelles in France. At the time, it was the largest privately funded construction project in the world.

== History ==
In April 1985, the British and French governments invited proposals for the construction of a link between the two countries to be privately funded. In July 1985, the British contractors formed Translink Contractors while the French consortium formed Transmanche Construction. On 18 October 1985, these two groups were merged to create the bi-national project organisation TransManche Link (TML). In January 1986, the two governments selected the proposal submitted by Channel Tunnel Group/France Manche for the construction of two undersea tunnels. On 12 February 1986, the Concession Agreement of 1986 between the governments of France and the United Kingdom with the goal of financing, building and operation of the Channel Tunnel. Shortly thereafter, Channel Tunnel Group awarded a contract for the tunnel's construction to TML.

While TML designed and built the tunnel, financing of the project was handled by Eurotunnel Group, who would own and operate it upon completion; on top of this arrangement, the British and French governments jointly controlled final engineering and safety decisions, which were later formalised through the Channel Tunnel Safety Authority. The British and French governments awarded Eurotunnel a 55-year operating concession, originally set to running from 1987; this was extended by 10 years to 65 years in 1993. Private funding for such a complex infrastructure project was of unprecedented scale. An initial equity of £45 million was raised, which was added to by £206 million private institutional placement, £770 million was raised in a public share offer that included press and television advertisements, a syndicated bank loan and letter of credit arranged £5 billion. Construction of the tunnel took place between 1988 and 1994; at the peak of construction activity, which employed roughly 15,000 people while in excess of £3 million was being expended each day.

In October 1986, Eurotunnel was partially floated, after which point shareholders, rather than the contractors or creditors, exercised direct control over the company. Over the following year, relations between TML and Eurotunnel deteriorated, with significant and increasingly public rows erupting over cost, delays and programme management.

During the winter of 1989/1900, Société d'études techniques et économiques, the independent engineering project manager for the tunnel's construction, produced a critical assessment of claimed costs by TML. Nevertheless, in September 1990, TML proceeded to formally submit a claim to Eurotunnel for additional payments related to the construction. By May 1992, TML had filed extra payment claims totalling $2.6 billion for its work. Eurotunnel Group repeatedly alleged poor workmanship in the project, which was disputed by TML. This conflicting claims would result in a long-lasting dispute between TML and Eurotunnel that continued throughout the remainder of the tunnel's construction. Into the mid 1990s, while TML maintained public disputes over a £500 million compensation claim over the delays and cost of the project, the individual contractors allocated considerable sums in reserve for a potential pay-out.

The final cost for the tunnel's construction came to around £9.5 billion, roughly double TML's original estimate of £4.7 billion. This overrun has been attributed, in part, as a response to enhanced safety, security, and environmental demands. Furthermore, financing costs were 140 percent higher than forecast. On two occasions, the Bank of England was compelled to intervene in the project's finances.

Following the completion of the Channel Tunnel in 1994, TML was dissolved.

== Organisation ==
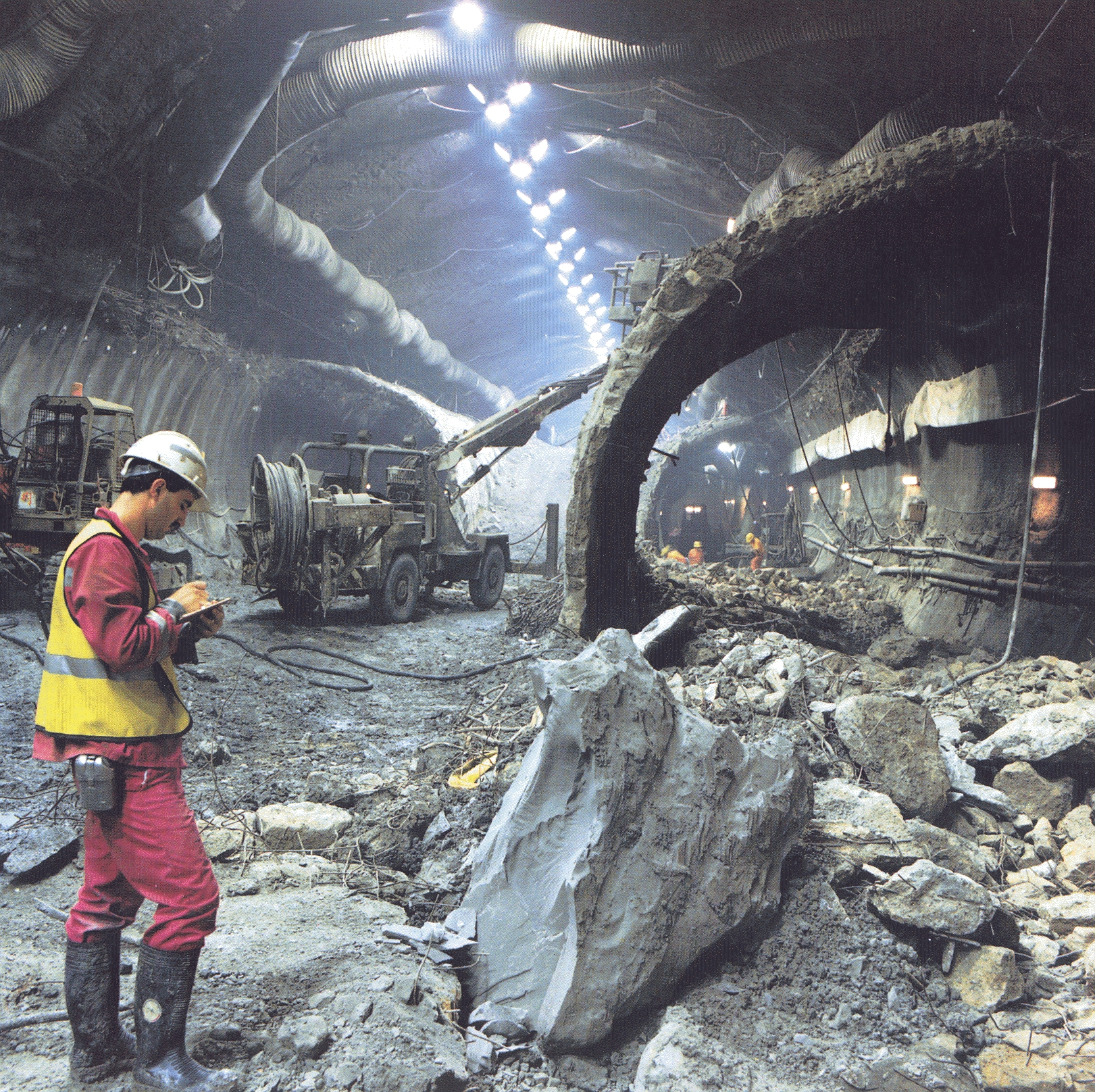

The participants were as follows:

Channel Tunnel Group (later Translink Contractors)

- Balfour Beatty
- Costain
- Tarmac Construction
- Taylor Woodrow Construction
- Wimpey International Construction
- NatWest
- Midland Bank

France Manche (later Transmanche Construction)

- Bouygues
- Dumez
- Société Auxiliaire d’Entreprise
- Société Générale d’Entreprises
- Spie Batignolles
- Crédit Lyonnais
- Banque Nationale de Paris
- Banque Indosuez
