= Aimé Thomé de Gamond =

French mining engineer

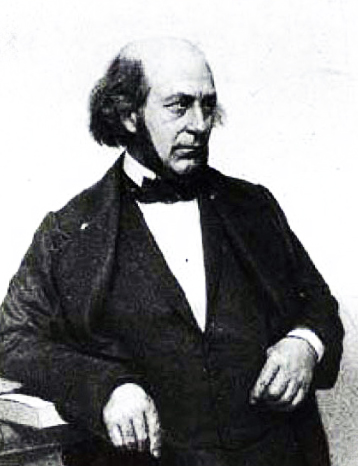
Aimé Thomé de Gamond

Aimé Thomé de Gamond (November 1807 – 1876) was a French engineer and entrepreneur who believed in the feasibility of constructing a Channel Tunnel under the Straits of Dover. However, despite his enthusiasm for such a venture, he died ridiculed and penniless because the project was not in conjunction with the political atmosphere of the period. He is now called the "father of the tunnel between France and England".

== Biography ==
De Gamond was born in Poitiers in 1807. He studied to become a mining engineer in the Netherlands before returning to France. In 1834 he proposed his first projects for a tunnel beneath the English Channel. Gamond spent all his wealth and 30 years of his life promoting his vision. However, at the time both England and France thought that separation made better political and economic sense.

In 1856, he presented a proposal to the emperor Napoleon III for a mined railway tunnel from Cap Gris-Nez to East Wear Point with a port/airshaft on the Varne sandbank, at a cost of 170 million francs, or less than £7 million. He would propose in total seven designs. His proposal was finally accepted in 1867 by Napoleon III and Queen Victoria but the Franco-Prussian War of 1870 brought an end to the project.

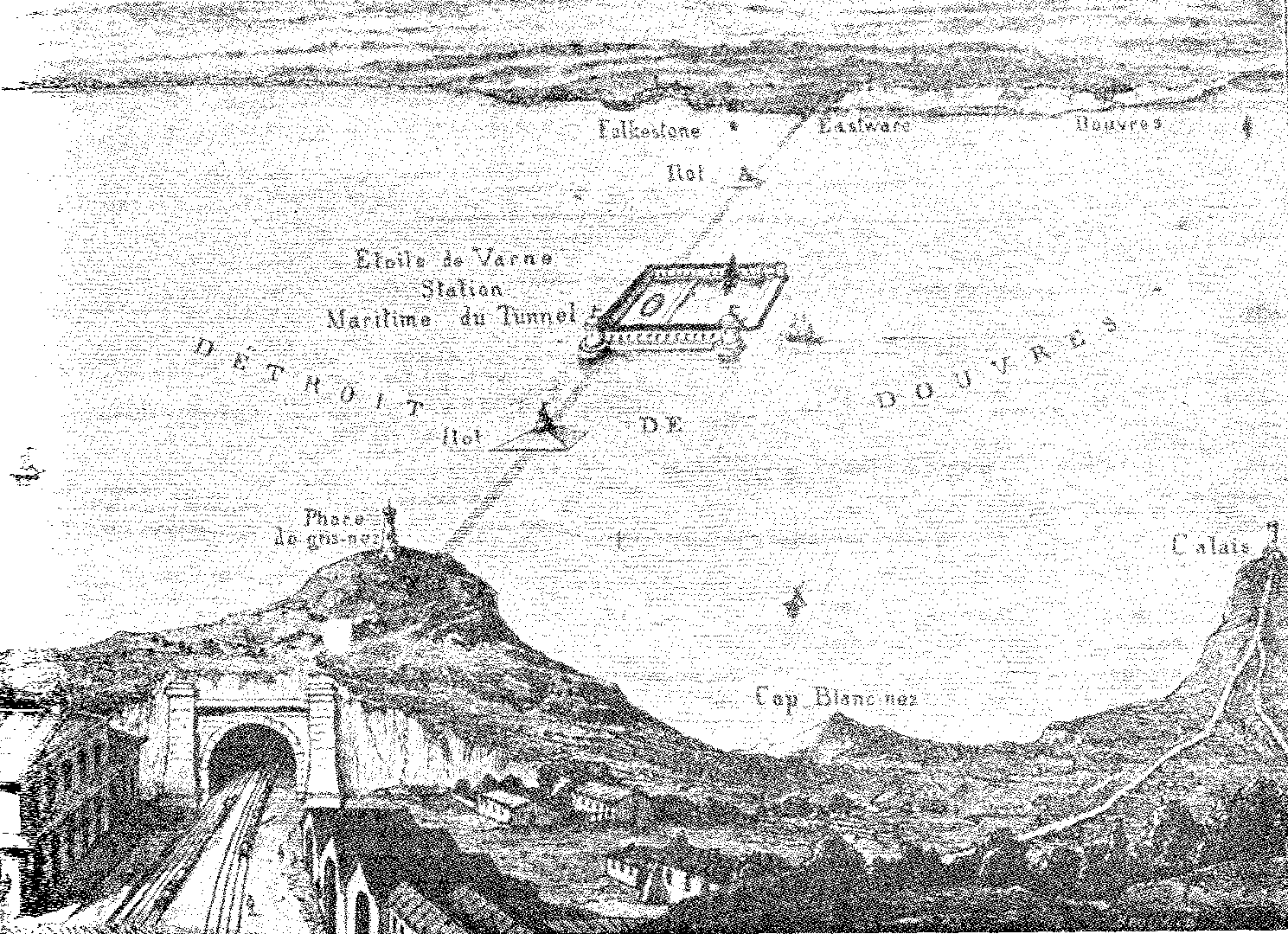
Thomé de Gamond's plan for a Channel tunnel, with a harbour mid-Channel on the Varne sandbank

Gamond's fiercest supporter was his daughter Elizabeth, who once rowed a boat into the English Channel so he could dive to the seabed to perform geological surveys on the chalk because so little was known about the Weald–Artois Anticline. Even after his money dried up, she taught music to finance his dream. However, a tunnel was never built. Gamond died ruined and humiliated in 1876.
