= Eurotunnel Class 0031 =

Class of diesel locomotives used for maintenance in the Channel Tunnel

Type and origin
- Power type: Diesel-mechanical
- Builder: Hunslet Engine Company; Rebuilt by Schöma
- Build date: 1989-1990; Rebuilt: 1993-1994
- Total produced: 12
Specifications
- Configuration
  - UIC: B
- Gauge: As built: 900 mm (2 ft 11 7/16 in); Rebuilt: 1,435 mm (4 ft 8 1/2 in) standard gauge
- Prime mover: Deutz FL10L 413FW
- Train brakes: Air
Performance figures
- Maximum speed: 50 km/h (31 mph)
- Power output: 170 kW (230 hp)
Career
- Operators: Getlink
- Numbers: 0031-0042

The Eurotunnel Class 0031 are a fleet of twelve 0-4-0 diesel locomotives used for maintenance duties in the Channel Tunnel. They were originally built to 900 mm (2 ft 11 7/16 in) gauge by the Hunslet Engine Company between 1989 and 1990 for construction work in the tunnel, and were subsequently rebuilt by Schöma to 1,435 mm (4 ft 8 1/2 in) standard gauge between 1993 and 1994.

The locomotives carry a yellow livery and are used by Getlink for shunting duties at Cheriton and Coquelles depots.

== Numbers and names ==
The locomotives are numbered 0031–0042 and all are named:

- 0031 Frances
- 0032 Elisabeth
- 0033 Silke
- 0034 Amanda
- 0035 Mary
- 0036 Laurence
- 0037 Lydie
- 0038 Jenny
- 0039 Pacita
- 0040 Jill
- 0041 Kim
- 0042 Nicole
