= France–United Kingdom border =

International border

France-UK border Frontière entre la France et le Royaume-Uni

Characteristics
- Entities: France United Kingdom

History
- Established: 1903
- Current shape: 1986
- Treaties: International arbitrations from 1977, 1978, 1982, 1988 and 1991 for the maritime border and the Treaty of Canterbury (1986) for the channel tunnel.

The border between the countries of France and the United Kingdom in Europe is a maritime border that stretches along the Channel, the North Sea and the Atlantic Ocean. The Channel Tunnel links the two countries underground and is defined as a 'land frontier', and not widely recognised as a land border.

Geological profile along the tunnel (in brown) as constructed above sea

It is defined by several international arbitrations from 1977, 1978, 1982, 1988 and 1991 for the maritime border and by the Treaty of Canterbury (1986) for the channel tunnel.

== Maritime border ==

1. 50°07′29″N 00°30′00″W (point A)
2. 50°08′27″N 01°00′00″W (point B)
3. 50°09′15″N 01°30′00″W (point C)
4. 50°09′14″N 02°03′26″W (point D)
5. 49°57′50″N 02°48′24″W (point D1)
6. 49°46′30″N 02°56′30″W (point D2)
7. 49°38′30″N 03°21′00″W (point D3)
8. 49°33′12″N 03°34′50″W (point D4)
9. 49°32′42″N 03°42′44″W (point E)
10. 49°32′08″N 03°55′47″W (point F)
11. 49°27′40″N 04°17′54″W (point F1)
12. 49°27′23″N 04°21′46″W (point G)
13. 49°23′14″N 04°32′39″W (point H)
14. 49°14′28″N 05°11′00″W (point I)
15. 49°13′22″N 05°18′00″W (point J)
16. 49°13′00″N 05°20′40″W (point K)
17. 49°12′10″N 05°40′30″W (point L)
18. 49°12′00″N 05°41′30″W (point M)
19. 48°06′00″N 09°36′30″W (point N)

In 2003, France signed an agreement with the United Kingdom to introduce 'juxtaposed controls' (in French, des bureaux de contrôles nationaux juxtaposés, or 'BCNJ') at Dover on the British side and at Calais, Dunkerque and Boulogne-sur-Mer on the French side.

This means that, when travelling from Dover to France by ferry, French immigration checks are carried out by the Police aux Frontières on British soil before boarding the ferry, whilst French customs checks take place upon arrival on French soil.

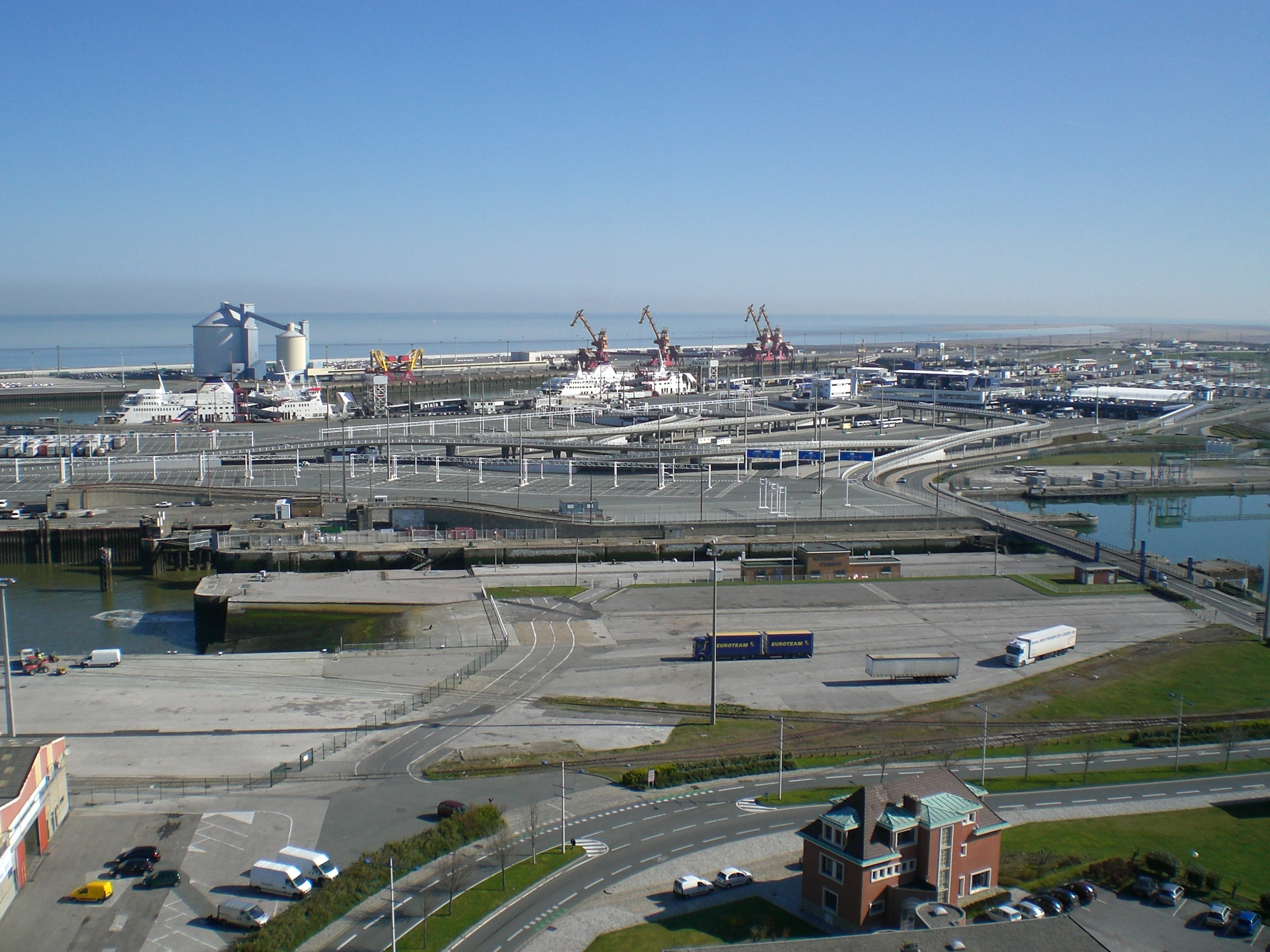
The Port of Calais

When travelling in the reverse direction from Calais, Dunkerque and Boulogne-sur-Mer in France to the UK by ferry, French immigration exit checks and British immigration checks both take place on French soil before boarding the ferry, whilst British customs checks take place upon arrival on British soil.

Border crossing point	French agency responsible for checks		Nature of presence	Ferries to/from outside the Schengen Area	
Border crossing point	Immigration	Customs	Nature of presence	Company	Foreign port(s)
Caen port	Police aux Frontières	Customs	Permanent	Brittany Ferries	Portsmouth
Calais port	Police aux Frontières	Customs	Permanent	DFDS Seaways and P&O Ferries	Dover
Carteret port	Police aux Frontières	Customs	Permanent	Manche Îles Express	Guernsey and Jersey
Cherbourg port	Police aux Frontières	Customs	Permanent	Brittany Ferries; Irish Ferries	Poole and Portsmouth; Rosslare
Diélette port	Customs	Customs	Permanent	Manche Îles Express	Alderney and Guernsey
Dieppe port	Police aux Frontières	Customs	Permanent	DFDS Seaways	Newhaven
Dunkerque port	Police aux Frontières	Customs	Permanent	DFDS Seaways	Dover
Granville port	Police aux Frontières	Customs	Permanent	Manche Îles Express	Jersey
Le Havre port	Police aux Frontières	Customs	Permanent	LD Lines	Portsmouth
Marseille port	Police aux Frontières	Customs	Permanent	Algérie Ferries	Algiers, Béjaïa, Oran and Skikda
Roscoff port	Customs	Customs	Permanent	Brittany Ferries; Irish Ferries	Cork and Plymouth; Rosslare
Saint-Malo port	Police aux Frontières	Customs	Permanent	Brittany Ferries; Condor Ferries	Portsmouth; Guernsey, Jersey, Poole, Weymouth
Sète port	Police aux Frontières	Customs	Permanent	Comarit	Nador and Tangier

== Land frontier ==
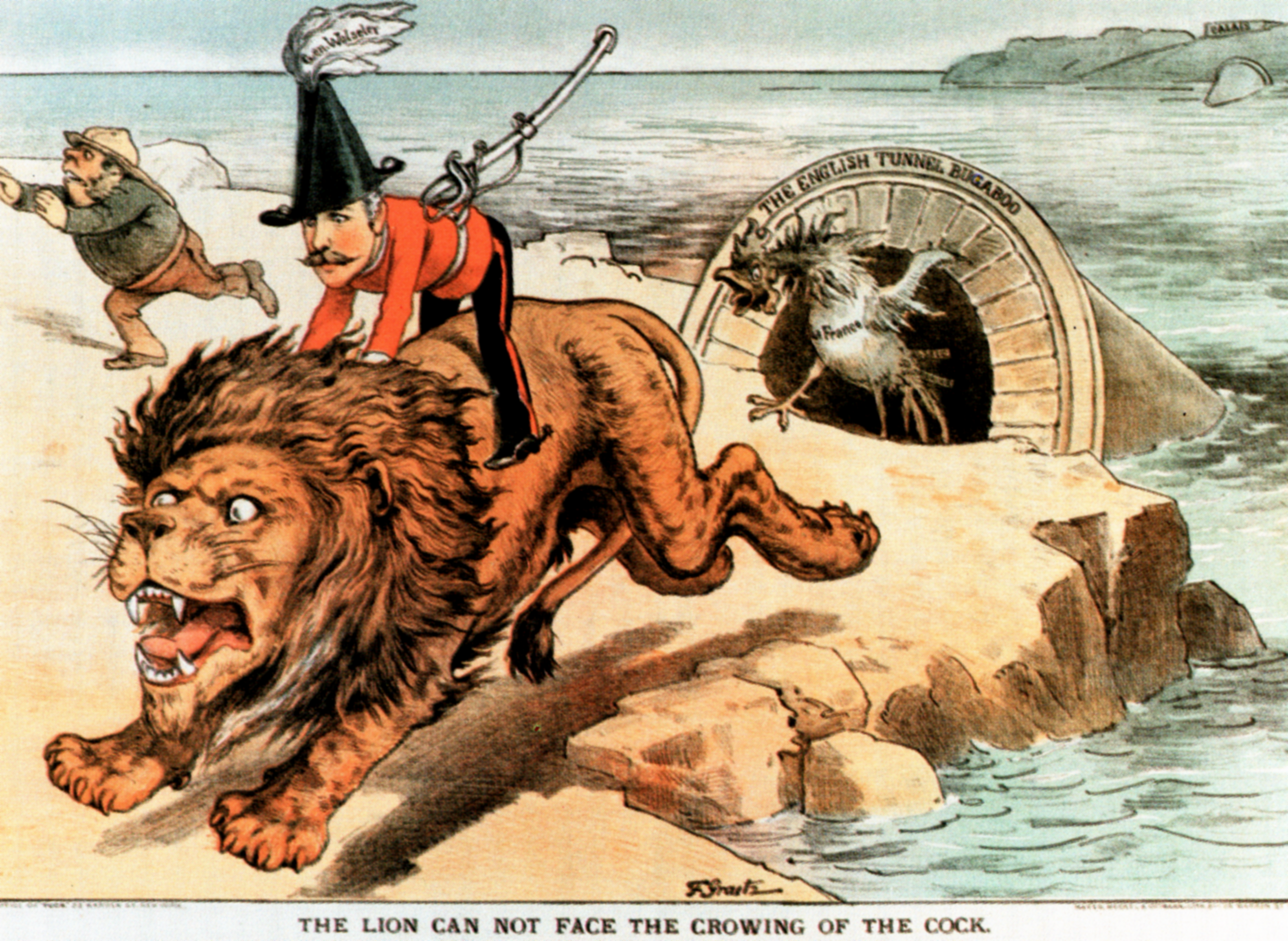
General Wolseley riding on the fleeing lion. Published in the American humour magazine Puck (approx. 1885). It depicts fears of a Channel Tunnel

Channel Tunnel course

The Treaty of Canterbury (French: Traité de Cantorbéry) was signed by British Prime Minister Margaret Thatcher and Foreign Secretary Sir Geoffrey Howe, French President François Mitterrand and Minister of Foreign Affairs Roland Dumas on 12 February 1986, and is the original document providing for the undersea tunnel between the two countries.

The Treaty of Canterbury (1986) is significant and unusual because it is a modern and recent modification to the national borders of the UK and France.

The Anglo-French Treaty on the Channel Tunnel was signed by both governments in Canterbury Cathedral. The treaty prepared the concession for the construction and operation of the fixed link by privately owned companies. It outlines the methods to be used for arbitration in the event of a dispute. It sets up the Intergovernmental Commission (IGC) which is responsible for monitoring all matters associated with the construction and operation of the tunnel on behalf of the British and French governments, together with a Safety Authority to advise the IGC.

It draws a land frontier between the two countries in the middle of the Channel tunnel – the first of its kind.

In the 1991 Sangatte Protocol, France signed an agreement with the United Kingdom to introduce 'juxtaposed controls' (in French, des bureaux de contrôles nationaux juxtaposés, or 'BCNJ') at Eurostar and Eurotunnel stations on immigration and customs, where investigations happen before travel. France is part of the Schengen Agreement, which has largely abolished border checks between member nations, but the United Kingdom is not.

These juxtaposed controls mean that passports are checked before boarding first by officials belonging to the departing country and then officials of the destination country. These are placed only at the main Eurostar stations: French officials currently only operate at London St Pancras but have previously operated at Ebbsfleet International and Ashford International, while British officials currently only operate at Lille-Europe and Paris-Gare du Nord but have previously operated at Calais-Fréthun. There are security checks before boarding as well. For the shuttle road-vehicle trains, there are juxtaposed passport controls before boarding the trains.

Border crossing point	French agency responsible for checks		Nature of presence	Trains to/from outside the Schengen Area
Border crossing point	Immigration	Customs	Nature of presence	Trains to/from outside the Schengen Area
Bourg-Saint-Maurice railway station	Customs	Customs	Seasonal (beginning of December to mid-April)	Seasonal Eurostar ski service
Calais Fréthun railway station	Police aux Frontières	Customs	Permanent	Up to three Eurostar trains per day to/from London St Pancras, Trains no longer call at intermediate stations Ashford International and Ebbsfleet International.
Eurotunnel Calais Terminal, Coquelles	Police aux Frontières	Customs	Permanent	Frequent Eurotunnel Shuttle services to/from Cheriton, Kent.
Lille-Europe railway station	Police aux Frontières	Customs	Permanent	Up to ten Eurostar trains per day to/from London St Pancras, Trains no longer call at Ashford International and Ebbsfleet International.
Marne-la-Vallée – Chessy railway station	Police aux Frontières	Customs	Permanent	Up to one Eurostar train per day to/from London St Pancras.
Moûtiers–Salins–Brides-les-Bains railway station	Customs	Customs	Seasonal (beginning of December to mid-April)	Seasonal Eurostar ski service
Paris Gare du Nord railway station	Police aux Frontières	Customs	Permanent	Up to 16 Eurostar trains per day to/from London St Pancras, Trains no longer call at intermediate stations Ashford International and Ebbsfleet International.

== Bibliography ==
- Georges Labrecque, « Les îles de l'Atlantique comme circonstances pertinentes à la délimitation des frontières maritimes », Norois, vol. 45, no 180 « L'Atlantique et les géographes », October–December 1998, p. 653–665 (DOI 10.3406/noroi.1998.6905), §1 « La frontière France/Royaume-Uni », p. 654–658.

== See also ==
- English Channel migrant crossings (2018–present)
- Calais border barrier
- France–United Kingdom relations
