= Treaty of Canterbury (1986) =

Treaty between France and the United Kingdom

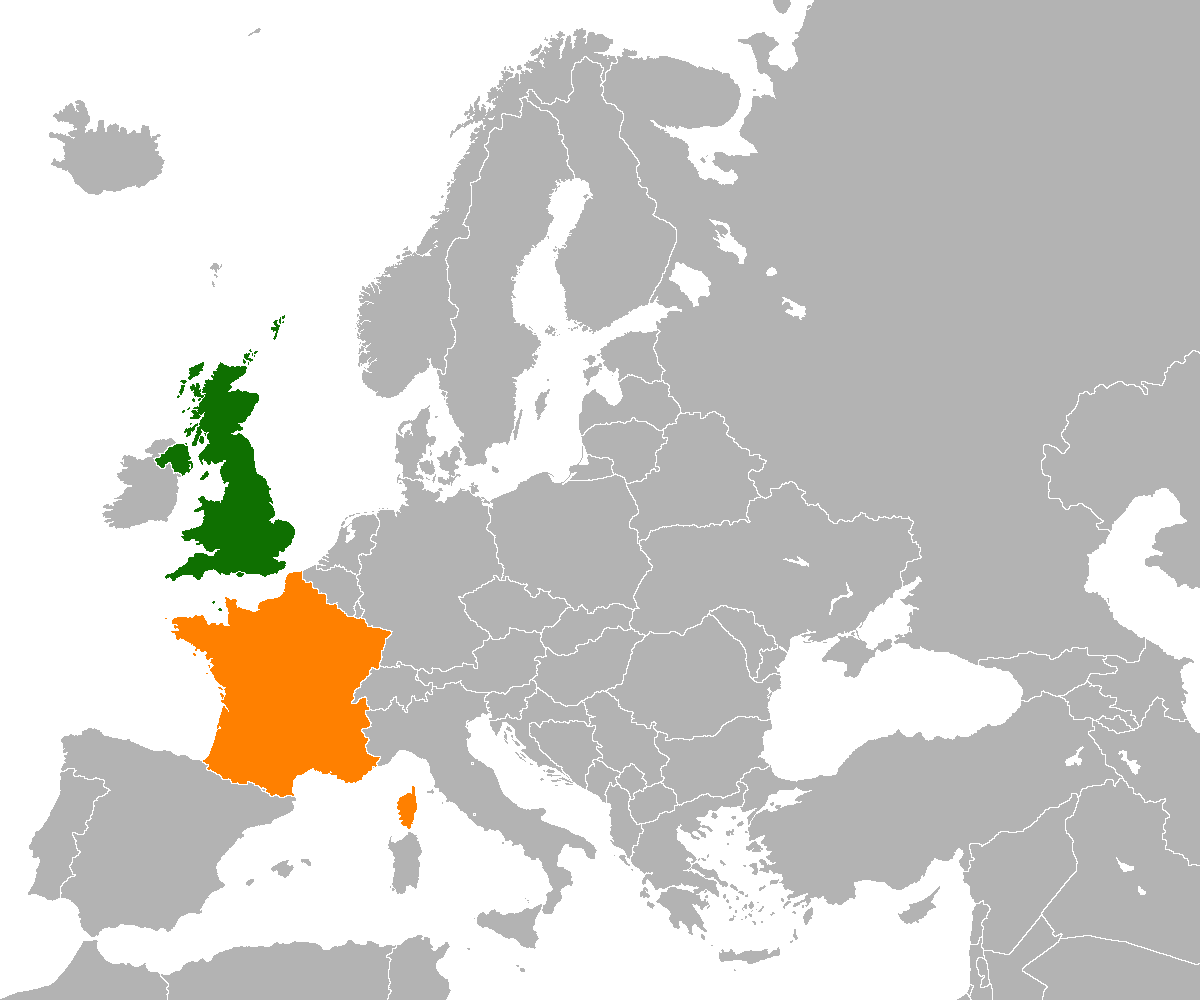
- Map of the United Kingdom and France
- Signed: 12 February 1986
- Location: Canterbury Cathedral, Canterbury, England
- Signatories: (United Kingdom) Margaret Thatcher (Prime Minister); Sir Geoffrey Howe (Foreign Secretary); (France) François Mitterrand (President); Roland Dumas (French Minister of Foreign Affairs)
- Parties: France; United Kingdom
- Languages: English and French

The Channel Tunnel crosses the maritime boundary between France and the United Kingdom between points 9 and 10 as defined by the London Agreement of 24 June 1982.

The Treaty of Canterbury (French: Traité de Cantorbéry) was signed by British prime minister Margaret Thatcher, British foreign secretary Sir Geoffrey Howe, French president François Mitterrand and French minister of foreign affairs Roland Dumas on 12 February 1986. It is the original document providing for the undersea tunnel between both countries. The treaty is significant and unusual because it is a modern and recent modification to the national borders of the UK and France. Similar proposals had made in the past but were never realised.

The Anglo-French Treaty on the Channel Tunnel was signed by both governments in Canterbury Cathedral. The treaty prepared the concession for the construction and operation of the "fixed link" by privately owned companies. The treaty outlines the methods to be used for arbitration in the event of a dispute. It sets up the Intergovernmental Commission (IGC), which is responsible for monitoring all matters associated with the construction and the operation of the tunnel on behalf of the British and the French governments, together with a Safety Authority to advise the IGC.

The treaty draws a land frontier between the two countries in the middle of the tunnel, the first of its kind.

The Treaty of Canterbury was followed a month later by the Concession Agreement, which was signed on 14 March 1986.

The Concession Agreement is a binding agreement between the British and French governments entrusting France Manche and the Channel Tunnel Group with the design, financing, construction and operation of the Channel Tunnel for a period of 55 years. The concession was later extended to 2086.

The agreement specifies, in particular, the purpose of the concession and the conditions applicable to its termination.

The appendices to the agreement cover specific aspects, including the purchase and sale of land, insurance obligations and the exercise of the right of substitution. The right of substitution provides for the temporary transfer of operation to two entities under the control of the lenders that financed the tunnel to allow them to be reimbursed. Substitution may be exercised only under specific cases of default by Eurotunnel and requires the lack of objection of either government.
