= Varne Bank =

Sand bank in the Strait of Dover, English Channel

Coordinates: 51°0′0″N 1°22′30″E

The Varne Bank or Varne Shoal is a 5 3/4-mile (9.3 km) long sand bank in the Strait of Dover, lying 9 miles (14 km) southwest of Dover in Kent, England. With the Lobourg Channel running parallel to it, the Varne bank lies immediately south-west of the deepest point 223 feet (68 m) in the strait of Dover. Its rectilinear shape is similar to other banks in the strait such as South Falls bank bordering the Lobourg Channel on the east, the Colbart bank (a.k.a. the Ridge) and others. Rectilinear banks are only present on the English side of the strait.

Lying almost in the middle of the south-west-facing international traffic lane on the English side of the English Channel, the Varne Bank is a constant concern for both British coastguards and shipping. The sea above it ripples strongly, especially during strong tides and bad weather.

With a minimum depth of about 2 metres (7 ft), it is marked by Trinity House with lighted buoys at the North, South, East and West. Due to the risk it presents, it has also marked the bank with a lightvessel since October 1860, located initially "near the west end of the Varne Shoal", 9 nautical miles (17 km) south of Folkestone church; over time it has been placed at various positions, and is now off its north-eastern end.

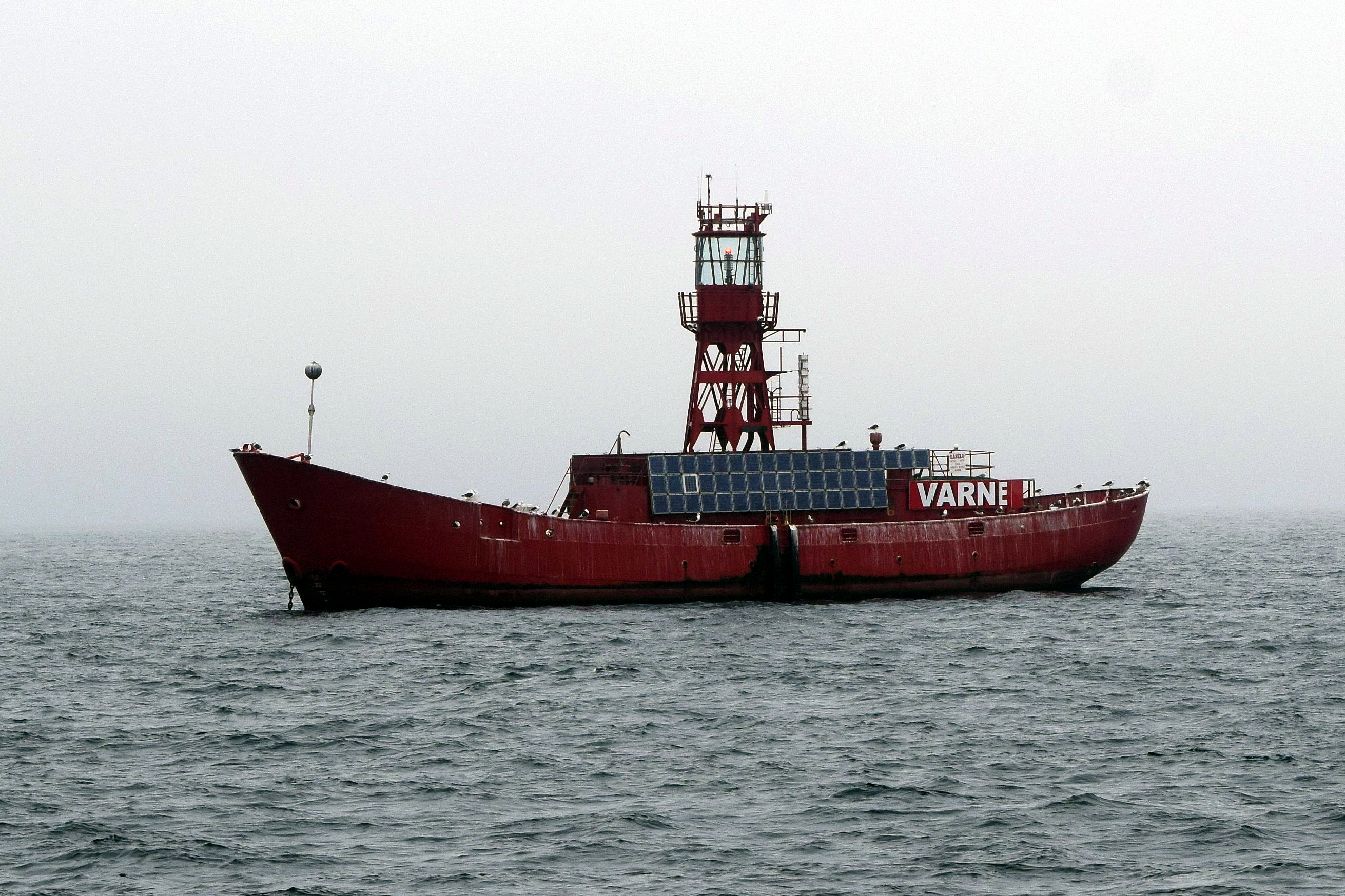
Varne lightvessel marking the Varne Bank in the Dover Strait.

Ships which founder on the Varne Bank are often stated as being lost on the Goodwin Sands in error, perhaps because the Varne Bank is less well known than its close northerly neighbour. Due to the increase of shipping through the world's busiest channel, several proposals have been made to eliminate the Varne Bank by dredging. However, also due to its shallow depth, the Varne Bank is a productive location for fishing, especially for cod and scallops.

In 1802, mining engineer Albert Mathieu made proposals to Napoleon for converting the Varne Bank into an island staging point for a Channel Tunnel.

During the 20th century, a proposal was made for a bridge across the Channel, which would have used the Varne Bank as a staging post for a support structure.

Several naval battles have been fought nearby, including the Battle of Dover and Battle of Dungeness in 1652 and the Battle of Dover Strait in 1917.

The Varne Bank along with its neighbouring bank Colbart, the Vergoyer bank, the ridens (fr) de Boulogne and the French side of the Bassurelle bank, form part of a 262 square miles (680 km^{2}) Natura 2000 protection zone listed by the name « Ridens et dunes hydrauliques du détroit du Pas de Calais » ("Ridges and dunes underwater of the strait of Pas de Calais").
