= Chemins de fer et transport automobile =

French transport company

Chemins de fer et transport automobile (CFTA) was a French transport company descended in 1966 from the Société générale des chemins de fer économiques which operated thousands of kilometres of local railways (mostly narrow gauge) in France in the late 19th century through to the 1930s.

CFTA became a part of the Veolia Transport as part of the Veolia Cargo division of the company. In 2009 Veolia Cargo was acquired by SNCF and Eurotunnel, with CFTA's freight division CFTA Cargo becoming Europorte proximity and part of Eurotunnel as part of its Europorte freight subsidiary.

The remaining part of CFTA became Transdev Rail in 2019.
