= Europort =

Europort may refer to

Ports and other logistics centres

- Wakefield Europort, Wakefield, West Yorkshire, UK
- Rosslare Europort, Rosslare Harbour, County Wexford, Ireland
- Thames Europort, Stone, Kent, UK
- Vatry Europort, Marne, France

Other

- Europort Avenue, Gibraltar
- Communauté de communes de l'Europort, former communauté de communes in Marne, France

Spelling variants

- Europoort - part of the Port of Rotterdam
- Europorte - A rail freight subsidiary of Eurotunnel
- Europorte 2 - A former rail freight subsidiary of Eurotunnel

== Similar spellings ==
- Eurosport, television sports network
