= Gounon =

Gounon is a surname. Notable people with the surname include:

- Jacques Gounon (born 1953), French senior civil servant and business manager
- Jean-Marc Gounon (born 1963), French racing driver
- Jules Gounon (born 1994), French racing driver
