= British Rail Class 18 =

Future locomotive class on British Railways

Type and origin
- Power type: Diesel-electric, with battery
- Builder: Clayton Equipment Company
- Model: CBD90 Hybrid+
Specifications
- Configuration
  - UIC: Bo'Bo'
  - Commonwealth: Bo-Bo
- Gauge: 1,435 mm (4 ft 8 1/2 in) standard gauge
- Loco weight: 90 tonnes (99 tons)
- Prime mover: JCB DIESELMAX 430
- Engine type: 4-stroke turbo-diesel
- Displacement: 2,978 mL (181.7 cu in)
- Cylinders: 4
Performance figures
- Maximum speed: 20 km/h (12 mph)
- Power output: 416 kW (558 hp)
- Tractive effort
  - Starting: 303 kN (68,000 lbf)

The British Rail Class 18 is a class of hybrid locomotives designed and built by the British railway locomotive manufacturer Clayton Equipment Company in Burton upon Trent, Staffordshire. It has also been referred to as the CBD90 Hybrid+ by Clayton and private railway customers.

The Class 18 was first revealed as the CBD90 during mid-2019; initial customers were typically operators of private railways, such as steelworks and nuclear power plants. In May 2020, the type was ordered by the rolling stock leasing company Beacon Rail, it has been envisaged as a successor to the 1950s era Class 08 and Class 09 shunters. The Class 18 is primarily battery-powered, being recharged either via track-side mains power supplies, regenerative braking, or its onboard diesel generator. A three-month trial using the first example of the type was conducted by the train operator GB Railfreight during early 2022.

== Details ==
During July 2019, British locomotive manufacturer Clayton Equipment Company revealed its development of a new battery-diesel shunting locomotive, the CBD90 Hybrid+. The company stated that its hybrid technology yielded several benefits, such as significant reductions in fuel consumption and emissions, around-the-clock availability, lower maintenance costs; furthermore, the locomotives' design made them suitable for working underground, such as in mines or other enclosed spaces. It was claimed that the manufacturing, testing and commissioning processes took a little over 24 weeks. Initial orders for the type came from multiple private operators; British steel manufacturer Tata Steel opted for an initial fleet of five CBD90s, and subsequently placed follow on orders for additional units. Another early customer was the Nuclear Decommissioning Authority's Sellafield subsidiary.

During May 2020, it was announced that the rolling stock leasing company Beacon Rail had placed an order with Clayton for the supply of fifteen CBD90 locomotives. The order had been reportedly made on a speculative basis, with no pre-arranged customer lined up to operate it at the time, as Beacon saw value in having such a locomotive in its portfolio regardless. The deal included options for further examples of the type. According to British rail freight journalist Simon Walton, at the time of the order, demand for hybrid locomotives was booming, with Clayton having reached a three-year waiting list.

These locomotives were assigned the Class 18 designation under TOPS, this selection was the next in sequence from the Class 17 Type 1 locomotives, which had also been produced by Clayton between 1962 and 1965. Beacon reportedly plans to offer the Class 18 as a replacement for Class 08 and Class 09 shunters, which are commonly used in private yards and sidings, all of which were at least 58 years old at the time of the Clayton order being placed. Company officials have been keen to emphasise the Class 18's environmental credentials, particularly its capacity for emission-free running, in comparison to legacy counterparts.

The Class 18 locomotive features a modular design and is primarily powered by 524 kWh lead–acid batteries, the latter are reportedly rated for a lifespan of seven to eight years and are easily replaceable. These batteries can be charged via a mains power supply, as well as through regenerative braking. Additionally, to increase its running time, the Class 18 also has an onboard 55 kW (74 hp) diesel generator, which is domestically manufactured by JCB Power Systems and is compliant with EU Stage V emissions regulations. The DC motors used require an unusually high operating voltage of 564V. In a standard configuration, it can reach a maximum speed of 12 miles per hour (20 km/h) and weighs roughly 90 tonnes (99 tons). Support for the Class 18 will be provided by Power Torque Engineering of Coventry. In addition to Britain's railways, the Class 18 has been homologated as to enable its operation across most of continental Europe.

On 1 February 2022, the first Class 18 locomotive, numbered 18001, was delivered to Whitemoor marshalling yards to begin a three-month trial with GB Railfreight, making the firm the type's first mainline operator. The locomotive will be primarily used in the shunting role. A follow-on trial, using 18002, will also be conducted at the Port of Felixstowe. David Golding, GB Railfreight's Asset Director, stated of the type: "The Class 18 hybrid+ shunting locomotive has the power to play a key role in the decarbonisation of our future fleet".
