= Europorte Channel =

Rail freight operator using the Channel Tunnel

- Industry: Rail freight
- Predecessor: Europorte 2
- Founded: 2003
- Headquarters: France
- Parent: Europorte
- Website: www.europorte.com

Europorte Channel (formerly Europorte 2) is a rail freight train operator which operates rail freight services between France and the United Kingdom through the Channel Tunnel. It is a subsidiary of Europorte.

In 2009 Europorte's parent company Eurotunnel acquired the French operations of Veolia Cargo leading to the rebranding of Europorte 2 as Europorte Channel.

== History ==
=== Background ===
Europorte 2 was founded in 2003. The company was established as an independent rail company, with a remit to expand freight operations around Calais. The company acquired a licence to operate in France in February 2006.

=== Operations ===
In June 2007 the Eurotunnel entered into a collaboration with the Port of Dunkirk relating to rail freight traffic through Europorte 2 subsidiary; the company was to operate trains from Dunkerque to the Delta 3 logistics terminal at Dourges, and collaborate on container shipments to the UK using the port of Dunkerque via channel tunnel. In 2010 Eurotunnel obtained a contract with the port to operate the enterprises own railway system - this contract was carried out by a new organisation Europorte Services.

In 2009 Eurotunnel acquired Veolia Cargo's French rail freight operations - during the period of absorption of these entities Europorte 2 was renamed Europorte Channel.

== Traction and rolling stock ==
A fleet of forty-six Class 92 locomotives were built by a consortium of Brush Traction and ABB between 1993 and 1996. Initially the fleet was split between Railfreight Distribution, SNCF and British Rail European Passenger Services (now Eurostar International) for operations through the Channel Tunnel.

The locomotives attached to London & Continental Railways were for operations of the Nightstar international sleeper services. Introduction of the sleeper services were delayed and then cancelled. During 2000, Eurostar International offered its seven Class 92 members (92020–21, 32, 40, 44–46) for sale, being surplus to requirements. No immediate buyer could be found, so the locomotives were decommissioned and stored at Crewe Electric TMD.

In February 2007, following a tender exercise, the seven locomotives were purchased by Eurotunnel for £2 million, for use by Europorte 2. In July 2011, Europorte 2/Eurotunnel purchased the five remaining locomotives that had belonged to SNCF, bringing Eurotunnel's total up to sixteen Class 92s.
