= GB Railfreight =

Rail freight company in the United Kingdom

GB Railfreight Limited
- Logo used since 2017

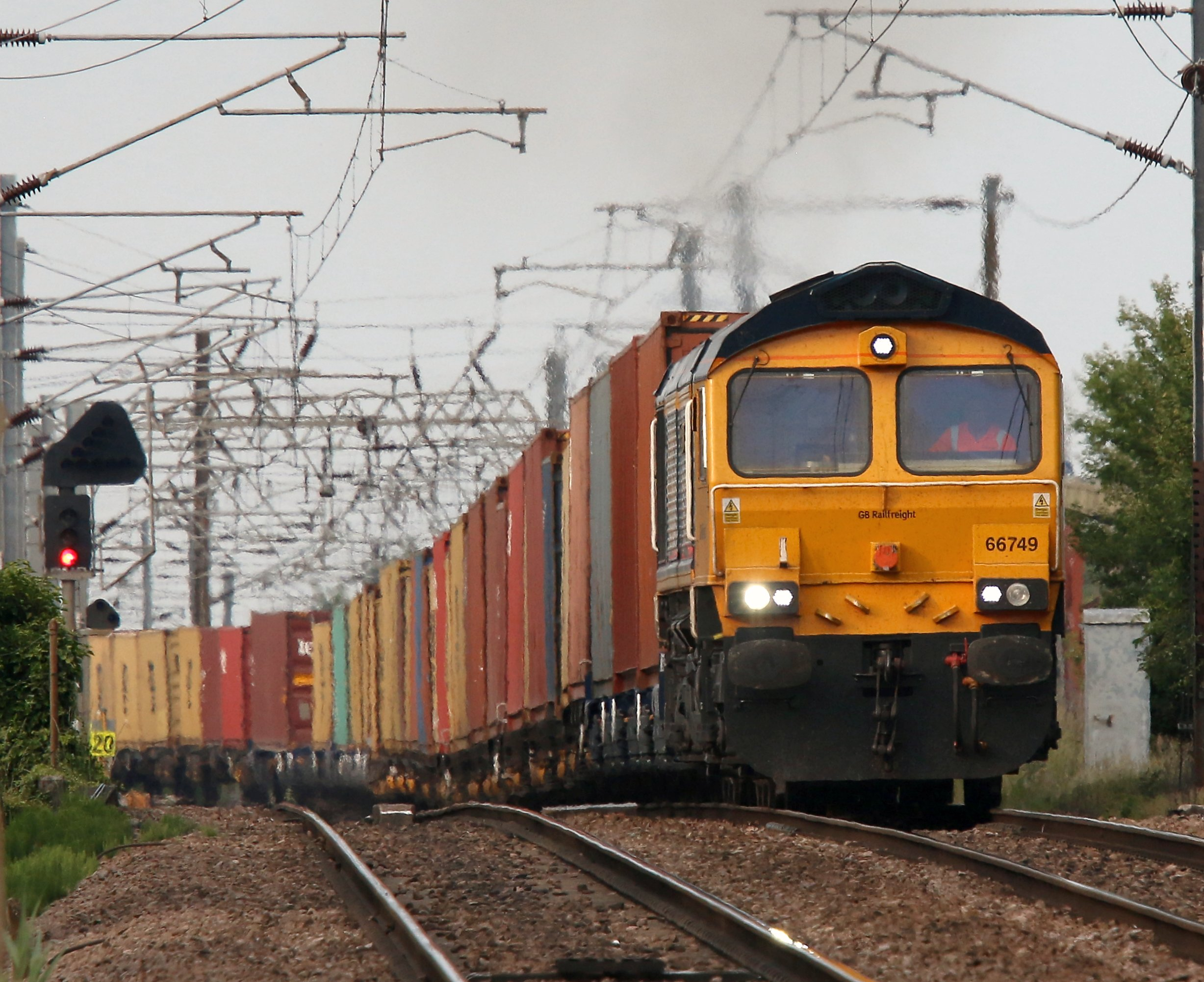
- Industry: Rail
- Founded: 2 April 1999
- Founder: GB Railways
- Headquarters: London, England
- Key people: John Smith (Managing Director)
- Services: Freight operating company
- Owner: Infracapital
- Website: www.gbrailfreight.com

GB Railfreight (GBRf) is a rail freight company in the United Kingdom. As of 2022, it is owned by the global investment company Infracapital, itself a subsidiary of M&G plc, a UK investment group.

GB Railfreight was established in April 1999 as the rail freight operating subsidiary of the train operating company GB Railways. It was granted an operator's licence in June 2000, and started running Intermodal container trains in February 2002; the haulage of other freight traffic commenced later that year. GBRf acquired numerous Class 66 locomotives to haul its trains; another early type would be the Class 20 and Class 73 locomotives. In August 2003, GBRf, via its parent company GB Railways, was acquired by FirstGroup; it was later rebranded as First GBRf. In 2005, it began running services for Royal Mail and Metronet; two years later, First GBRf ran its first coal trains. In 2009, it was granted a passenger license, after which it operated such services under contract to First Great Western.

In June 2010, the company was acquired by Europorte, after which the GB Railfreight branding and livery were promptly reinstated. Following this purchase, it took on Europorte's fleet of Class 92 electric locomotives, as well as buying additional Class 66s and Class 56s amongst other types to expand its inventory as service volume rose. Contracts to haul new-build rolling stock for operators and operate rail traffic at multiple steelworks were awarded during the early 2010s; GBRf also begun operations on hauling the Caledonian Sleeper service in April 2015. During October 2016, the company was bought by EQT AB, and was partly integrated with Hector Rail. In September 2019, GBRf's ownership changed hands again, this time to Infracapitial.

== History ==
=== Formation and launch ===
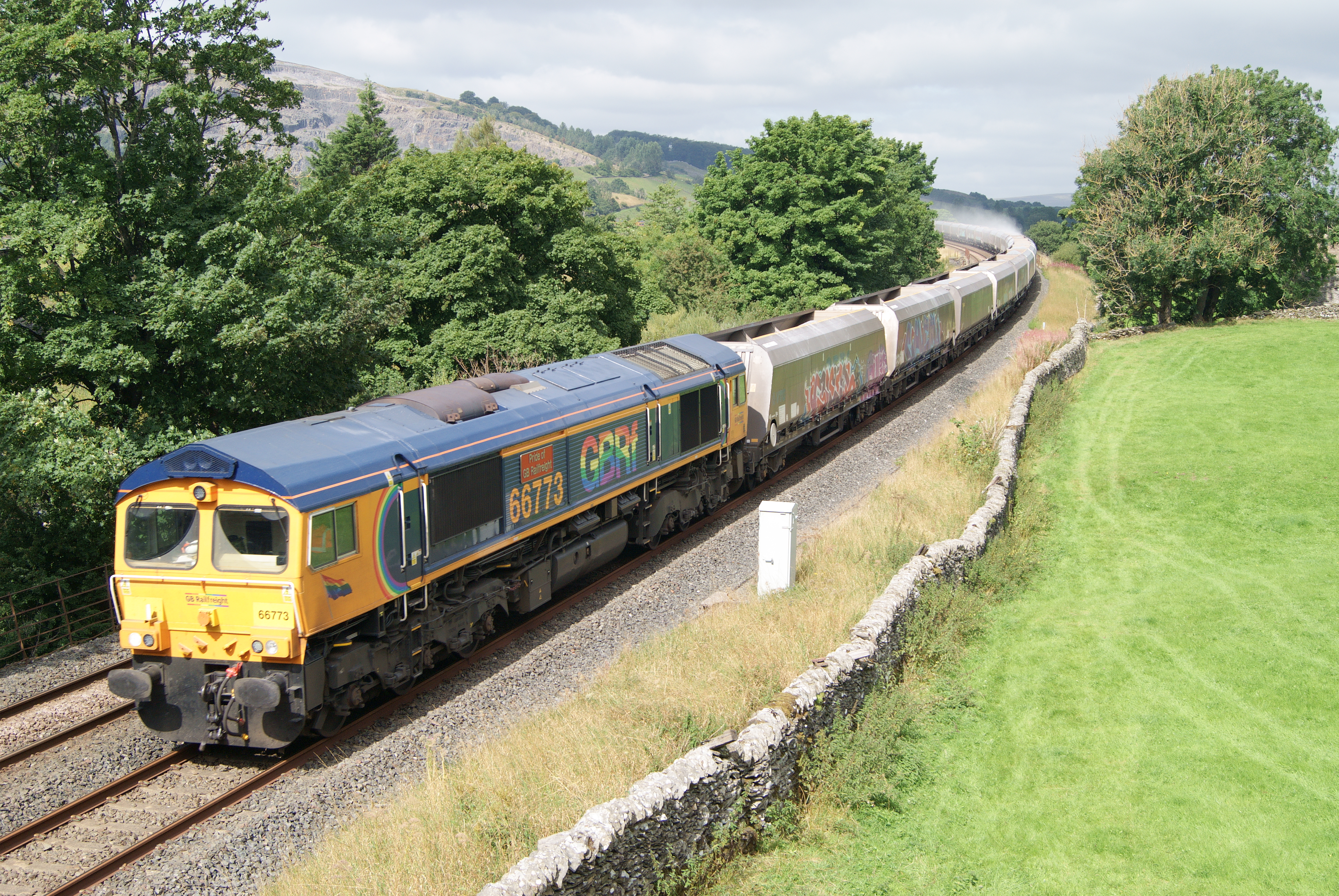
GBRf Class 66, "Pride of GB Railfeight" in rainbow livery, with a full load from Arcow Quarry, Ribblesdale

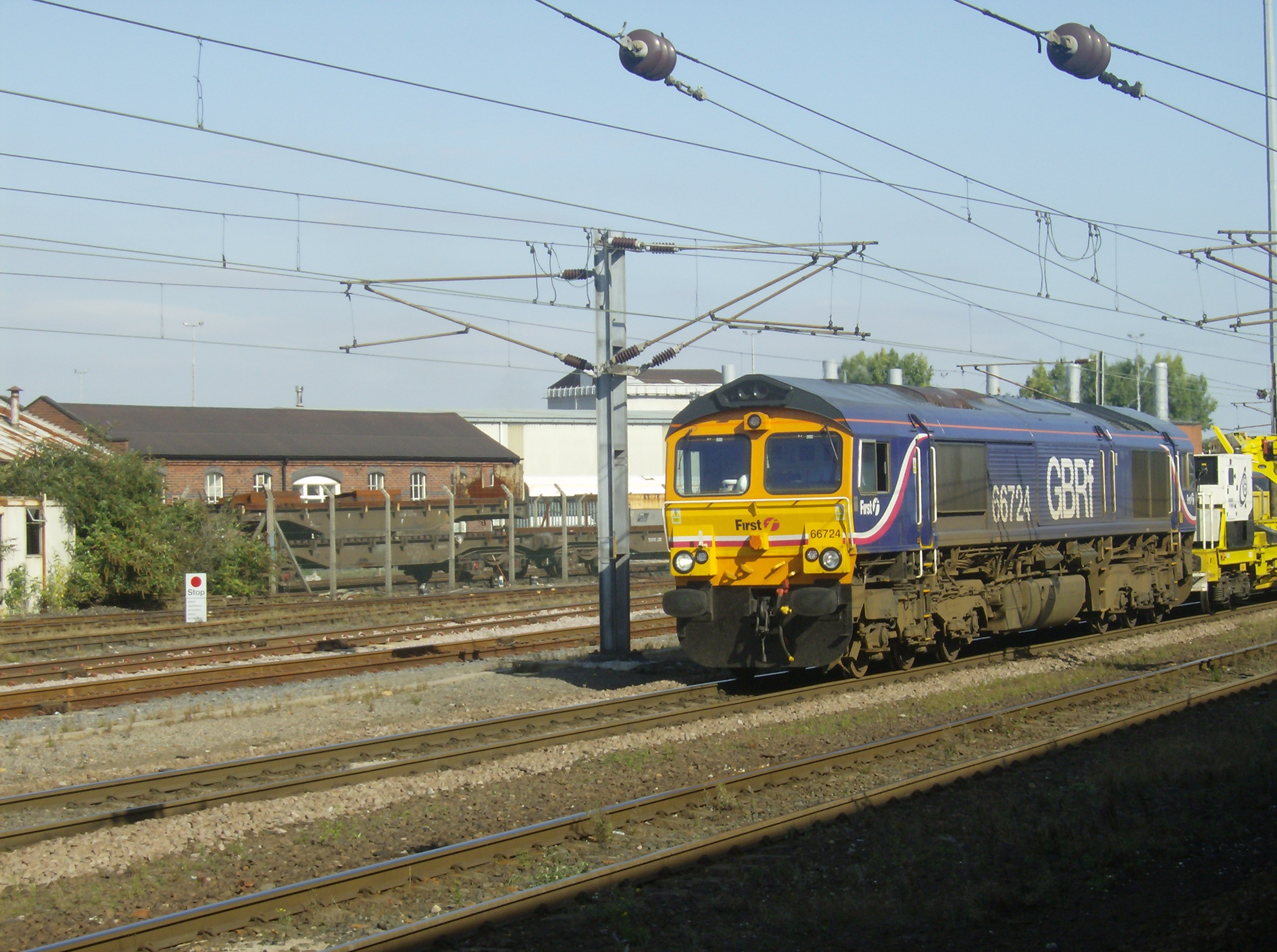
Class 66 in First GBRf livery at Doncaster station in September 2007

First GBRf logo

The origins of GB Railfreight can be traced back to early 1999, when the privately owned train operating company GB Railways decided to form its own dedicated rail freight subsidiary. Accordingly, unlike the majority of private rail freight companies that emerged in the British market during the 1990s, such as DB Cargo UK and Freightliner, GB Railfreight was not formed from any element of the privatised British Rail freight sectors.

During April 2000, following the awarding of an eight-year contract to operate infrastructure trains on behalf of British railway infrastructure owner Railtrack, the company ordered seven Class 66 locomotives. In June 2000, GB Railfreight was granted an operator's licence, permitted it to run trains on the British rail network. On 1 April 2000, it commenced operations. During February 2002, GBRf commenced operating its first Intermodal container contract from the Port of Felixstowe for MSC Mendite. Also that same year, GBRf began its first bulk freight contract for British Gypsum.

=== FirstGroup era ===
During August 2003, GB Railways was purchased by the British transport conglomerate FirstGroup; subsequently, GB Railfreight was rebranded as First GBRf. In April 2004, GB Railfreight commenced operating a five-year contract for Network Rail; it also expanded its fleet through the acquisition of four former Gatwick Express Class 73 locomotives and numerous additional wagons to work the new contract.

In May 2005, First GBRf began operating Royal Mail services using Class 325 electric multiple-units (EMUs). The company's arrangement with Royal Mail was subsequently extended through to 2010. Also in 2005, GBRf commenced operating London Underground infrastructure trains for Metronet. During March 2007, First GBRf commenced operating its first coal trains, on behalf of both Drax Group and EDF Energy.

In June 2007, the business was renamed First GBRf.

During summer 2009, First GBRf was granted a passenger licence, allowing it to operate charter services. Between December 2009 and July 2010, First GBRf operated passenger services under contract to the train operating company First Great Western. These services, running from Cardiff Central to Taunton, consisted of hired Virgin Trains Class 57/3 locomotives hauling rakes of Mark 2 carriages.

=== Europorte era ===
Logo while under Europorte ownership

During May 2010, FirstGroup announced that it was putting the business up for sale; various companies, including Europorte, Freightliner and SNCF, were reportedly interested in acquiring First GBRf. On 1 June 2010, it was announced that it had been purchased by Europorte. Following the acquisition by Europorte, the company reverted to its original name and a revised version of the original livery.

In February 2011, GBRf commenced operation of rail traffic at Cardiff Tidal/Tremorfa Works. In 2012, GBRf commenced a ten-year contract to operate the 43-mile (69 km) rail network at Sahavirirya Steel Industries Lackenby steelworks, Teesside.

During 2013, GB Railfreight were contracted to deliver Class 700 EMUs, constructed by Siemens in Krefeld, Germany, from the Channel Tunnel; the firm was also contracted to haul Class 800/801s high speed trains. For the latter contract, GBRf provided trains crews during the testing process, as well as hauling the sets.

In April 2015, GB Railfreight commenced a contract from Serco to haul the Caledonian Sleeper. Class 92s haul it from London Euston to Edinburgh Waverley/Glasgow Central with rebuilt Class 73/9s to haul it from Edinburgh to Aberdeen, Inverness and Fort William. During early 2019, GBRf worked closely with Wabtec and Serco to prepare for the launch of the new Mark 5 carriages for the Caledonian Sleeper.

In October 2016, the business was purchased by the global investment firm EQT AB, after which its operations were aligned with its Hector Rail subsidiary internationally. At the time of the acquisition, GB Railfreight reportedly operated in excess of 1,000 trainloads of freight per week, moving roughly 15% of the UK’s rail freight, and had a forecast annual revenue of £125 million.

During September 2019, EQT AB announced it had agreed to sell GB Railfreight to another investment company, Infracapital; the transaction was completed one month later. At the time of the sale, GBRf was reportedly the third largest freight company operating in the UK, moving roughly 23% of all rail freight, had a turnover of more than £200 million per year and had in excess of 900 employees.

On 9 April 2021, GBRf opened their new office in Peterborough; the building houses the company's Operations departments, its 24-hour control centre, and undertakes training using onsite simulators; in the latter aspect, there are ambitions to become a major provider of training for train drivers and managers across the whole rail sector.

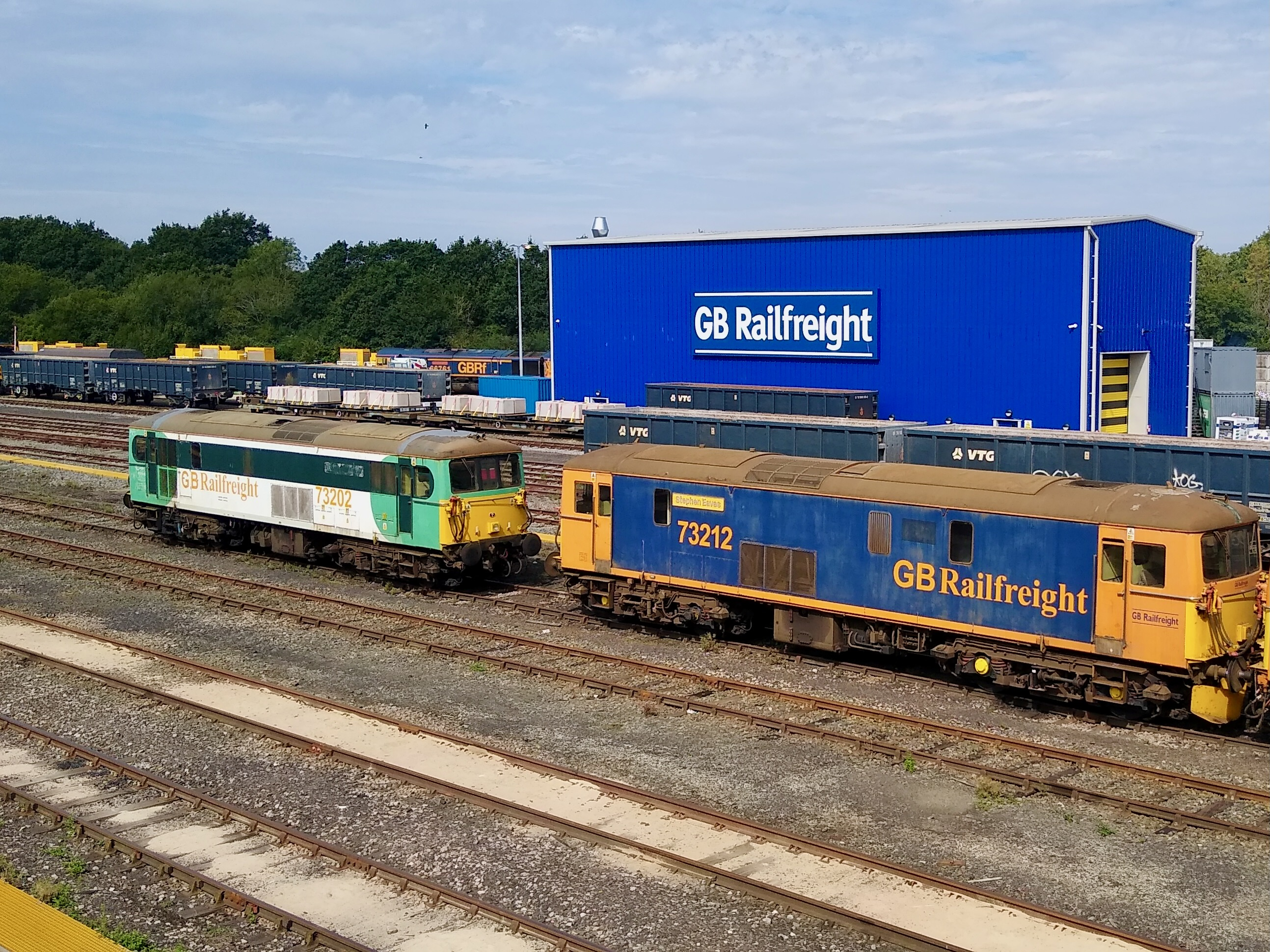
The new GBRf maintenance facility at Tonbridge West Yard, opened in September 2024

In September 2024, GBRf opened a new maintenance facility for its Class 66, Class 69 and Class 73 locomotives at its site in Tonbridge, Kent.

== Fleet ==
=== Mainline fleet ===
To commence operations, seven Class 66/7s were ordered by GB Railfreight in April 2000. The type proved its value to the company, leading to multiple follow-on orders being placed. During October 2012, three unused Class 66s, previously ordered by Crossrail Benelux and stabled in the Netherlands, were purchased and transported to Britain by GBRf. In the following year, a further two Class 66s that had previously operated in continental Europe were also obtained. These were numbered 66747 to 66751 in the GBRf fleet. By the end of 2014, the total number of Class 66s purchased by GBRf had risen to 72.

In 2015, it was confirmed a further seven Class 66s would be purchased. Even though the locomotive type no longer conforms with emissions regulations, GBRf had purchased some spare EMD 710 engines, shipped them to the United Kingdom before the 31 December 2014 deadline and then returned them to the United States for fitting to the new locomotives to be delivered in 2016. During late 2017, DB Cargo UK sold ten Class 66/0s (66008/016/046/058/081/132/141/184/238/250) to GBRf, who allocated the 66780–789 series to them in ascending order. 66789 (formerly 66250), was outshopped in British Rail Large Logo Blue and named British Rail 1948 – 1997 to commemorate British Rail's 70th anniversary. It also acquired three Class 47/7s from Colas Rail, for use on Caledonian Sleeper and stock move duties (47727, 47739, 47749)

In June 2019, GBRf secured the lease of three Class 66 locomotives from Beacon Rail that had previously been in use with Hector Rail in Sweden as T66 403–405. The first locomotive, 66790 (T66 403) arrived on 3 June and was moved from Immingham Docks to Longport, where Electro-Motive Diesel were to convert it to UK standards before it entered traffic. The locomotives date from November 2002, and were bought by Beacon Rail from HSBC Rail in 2009. During October 2020, GB Railfreight commenced the lease of a further five Class 66s from Beacon Rail, all of which being imported from Germany. The first of this batch were planned to enter service in April 2021, receiving the numbers 66793–797.

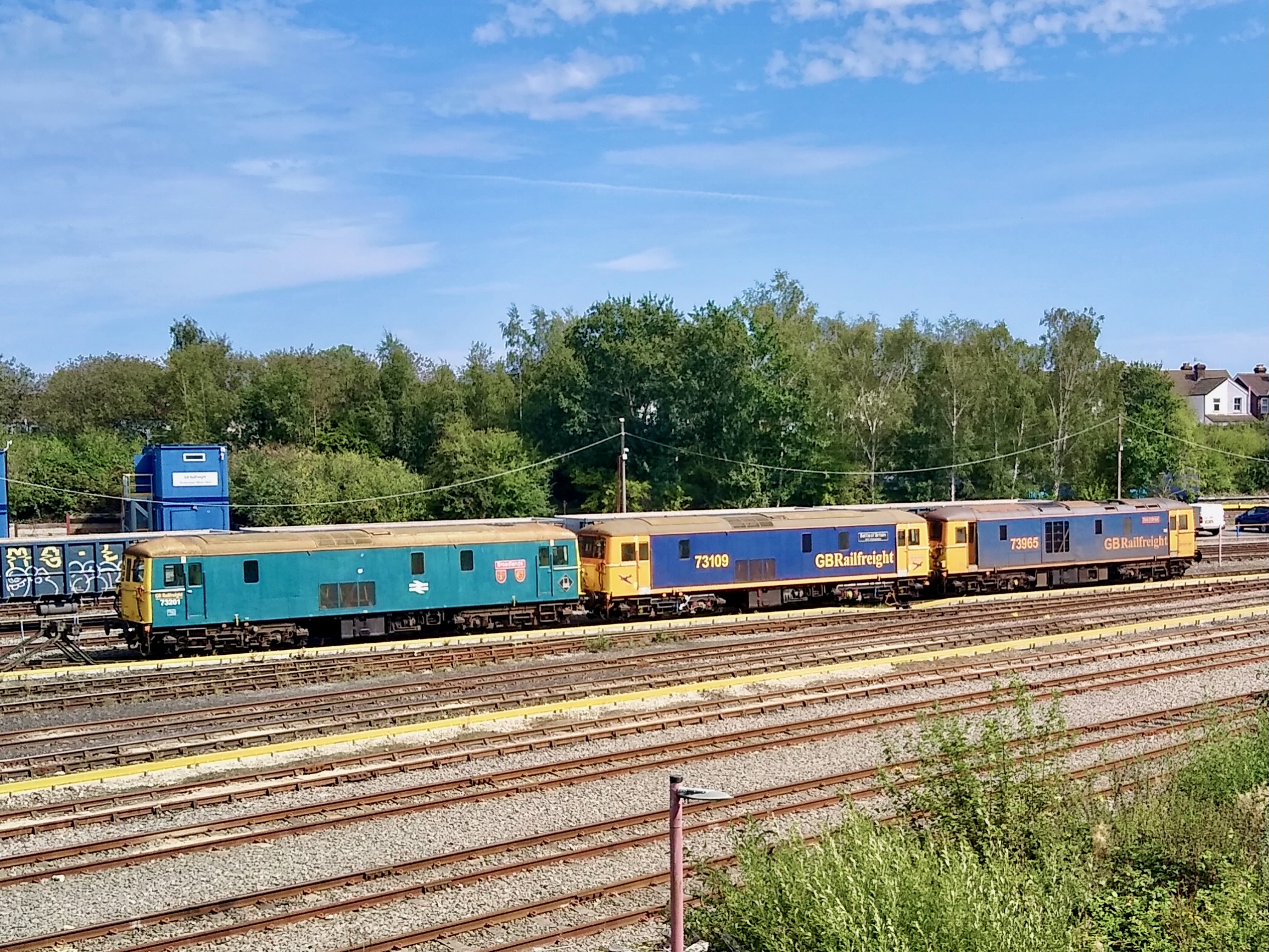
Three GBRf Class 73s at Tonbridge West Yard

In 2004, GB Railways purchased six former Gatwick Express Class 73s. After GBRf won a contract to operate Network Rail infrastructure trains in the south-east, four were overhauled by Fragonset Railways. Two more were purchased from Loram UK, and additional Class 73s were located and purchased, some from preservation, to give a total fleet, As of July 2018, of 24 locomotives. Of these, eleven were completely re-engineered between 2014 and 2015, being equipped with 1,600 hp (1,200 kW) MTU diesel power units; five were dedicated to Network Rail infrastructure traffic in the south of England while the remaining six being transferred to Scotland for use on the diesel-hauled legs of the Caledonian Sleeper services.

GB Railfreight has a fleet of 16 Class 92 electric locomotives acquired by Europorte prior to the purchase of GB Railfreight.

In August 2014, GBRf purchased a single Class 59 locomotive from the Germany company Heavy Haul Power International. This locomotive had originally been purchased by the Foster Yeoman group (along with its sister locomotives 59001/002/004/005), these being the first privately owned locomotives to operate under British Rail.

In June 2018, GBRf acquired 16 of the Class 56 locomotives owned by UK Rail Leasing (UKRL), together with various parts. Most of these were subsequently re-engineered. The locomotives were previously owned by DB Cargo and subsequently hired to Fertis for high speed rail construction trains in France; after their return to the UK, they were acquired by UKRL during 2014 for spot hire. Only 56081, 56098 and 56104 had been made operational by UKRL, with the majority stored at Leicester depot.

In early 2022, 2 ex-Colas Rail Class 67s joined the fleet. A new fleet of 16 Class 69 locomotives, converted from Class 56s, were also being delivered in different liveries and brands. Furthermore, that same year, GB Railfreight ordered 30 new Class 99 bi-mode locomotives for delivery in 2025; these are intended to replace its Class 66 fleet.

In June 2023, GBRf began leases on 57303, 57305, 57306 and 57310. They are used for Multiple Unit transfers, and have also operated as the power for passenger charter trains.

In February 2026 GB Railfreight has confirmed various diesel locomotives it will offer for sale at auction in March. It’s part of a broader fleet renewal programme. The disposal encompasses a range of older diesel traction vehicles. Inspections are scheduled to take place in the coming weeks at several locations.The decision to sell the locos is due to the staged introduction of 30 bi-mode Class 99 locomotives.

=== Heritage diesels ===
GBRf has also utilised a number of heritage diesel locomotives. Class 20s are used on London Underground S Stock moves between Derby Litchurch Lane Works, Old Dalby Test Track and London Underground's Neasden Depot. It hires these from various owners, including Harry Needle Railroad Company. During mid-2014, five Class 47s were hired from Riviera Trains for a short period. In January 2019, GB Railfreight received a pair of Class 50 locomotives on loan from the Class 50 Alliance Preservation Group, with both locomotives (50 007 and 50 049) repainted into GBRf livery and returned to service in March 2019. In August 2024, both locomotives were returned to the Severn Valley Railway.

Occasionally, GBRf has hired preserved locomotives, such as the Class 55 Deltic no. 55022 Royal Scots Grey and Class 52 Western no. D1015 Western Champion.

=== Shunter fleet ===
To operate services on the Lackenby steelworks, Teesside network, eight 1996–97-era Maschinenbau Kiel locomotives were purchased from Norwegian State Railways. They were classed as Di8.

GB Railfreight operated a pair of refurbished Vanguard 0-6-0DH locos (re-numbered DH50-1 and DH50-2) for shunting purposes at Tremorfa/Cardiff Tidal works. In December 2016, these were returned to Hunslet in favour of Class 08s (08389, 08877, 08924) hired in from Harry Needle Railroad Company.

In addition, GB Railfreight operate 2 Class 08s (08925 and 08934) and 2 Class 09s (09002 and 09009) at Whitemoor.

In August 2024, GB Railfreight announced it had acquired four Clayton Equipment Class 18 Hybrid+ CBD90 shunt locomotives, leased from Beacon Rail. These are diesel-electric + battery Bo-Bo shunters with recharging of the batteries both through a three phase shore supply and through regenerative braking. The locomotives are also fitted with a EU Stage V emissions compliant diesel engine. They are based at Whitemoor, Eastleigh, and Bescot.

=== Fleet ===
Class	Image	Type	Built	Number	Wheel Arr	Numbers/Notes
Class 08		Diesel shunter	1953	5	0-6-0	Fleet of 5 locomotives inherited from British Rail and Harry Needle Railroad Company. In 2026 the following locomotives have been put up for sale: 08925; 08934
Class 09		Diesel shunter	1959	2	0-6-0	Fleet of 2 locomotives inherited from British Rail. In 2026 the following locomotive has been put up for sale.: 09002
Class 18		Diesel-electric with battery shunter	2022	4	Bo-Bo	Trials of the new locomotive type were conducted in 2022 at Whitemoor marshalling yard
Class 47		Diesel locomotive	1962–1967	3	Co-Co	Fleet of 3 locomotives inherited from Colas Rail. In 2026 the following locomotives have been put up for sale.: 47727; 47739; 47749
Class 56		Diesel locomotive	1976–1984	2	Co-Co	Fleet of 18 locomotives. 2 are operational as of 2024.: 16 locomotives are in the process of being rebuilt as Class 69s.
Class 57		Diesel locomotive	1964–67 (rebuilt 1998–2004)	4	Co-Co	Fleet of 4 locomotives purchased from Direct Rail Services in June 2023.
Class 59		Diesel locomotive	1985	1	Co-Co	1 locomotive purchased from Heavy Haul Power International (HHPI), Germany in August 2014. In 2026 the following locomotive has been put up for sale.: 59003
Class 60		Diesel locomotive	1989	13	Co-Co	Fleet of 13 locomotives from Colas Rail and DB Cargo UK in 2018. In 2026 the following locomotives have been put up for sale.: 60002; 60021; 60026; 60047; 60056; 60076; 60085; 60087; 60095; 60096; Spare part donors 60004, 60014 and 60018 are currently not listed as for sale.
Class 66		Diesel locomotive	2000–2015	104	Co-Co	Fleet of 104 locomotives. Inherited from Colas Rail, DB Cargo UK, Direct Rail Services, Fastline Freight, Freightliner and HHPI.
Class 67	Kingswear – DB Cargo 67030 on the level crossing	Diesel locomotive	1999–2000	1	Bo-Bo	1 locomotive transferred from Colas Rail in early 2022.
Class 69		Diesel locomotive	1976–84 (rebuilt 2020–24)	16	Co-Co	Fleet of 16 locomotives converted from Class 56s.
Class 73		Electro-diesel locomotive	1962, 1965–1967	24	Bo-Bo	Fleet of 24 locomotives. 20 are operational as of 2024.: 6 locomotives are used with Caledonian Sleeper; 5 locomotives are allocated to the GBNR pool for use with Network Rail; 3 locomotives are stored; 1 locomotive has been scrapped
Class 92		Electric locomotive	1993–1996	16	Co-Co	Fleet of 16 locomotives. 12 are operational as of 2024.: 7 locomotives are used with Caledonian Sleeper; 4 locomotives are stored
Class 99	99002 on Innotrans trade fair in Berlin, 24 September 2024	Electro-diesel locomotive	2025 - Present	30	Co-Co	Fleet of 30 locomotives on order for delivery in 2025.; First 2 units delivered in July 2025.; First commercial service 28 July 2026
			Total	225		
