= Getlink =

Company operating the Channel Tunnel

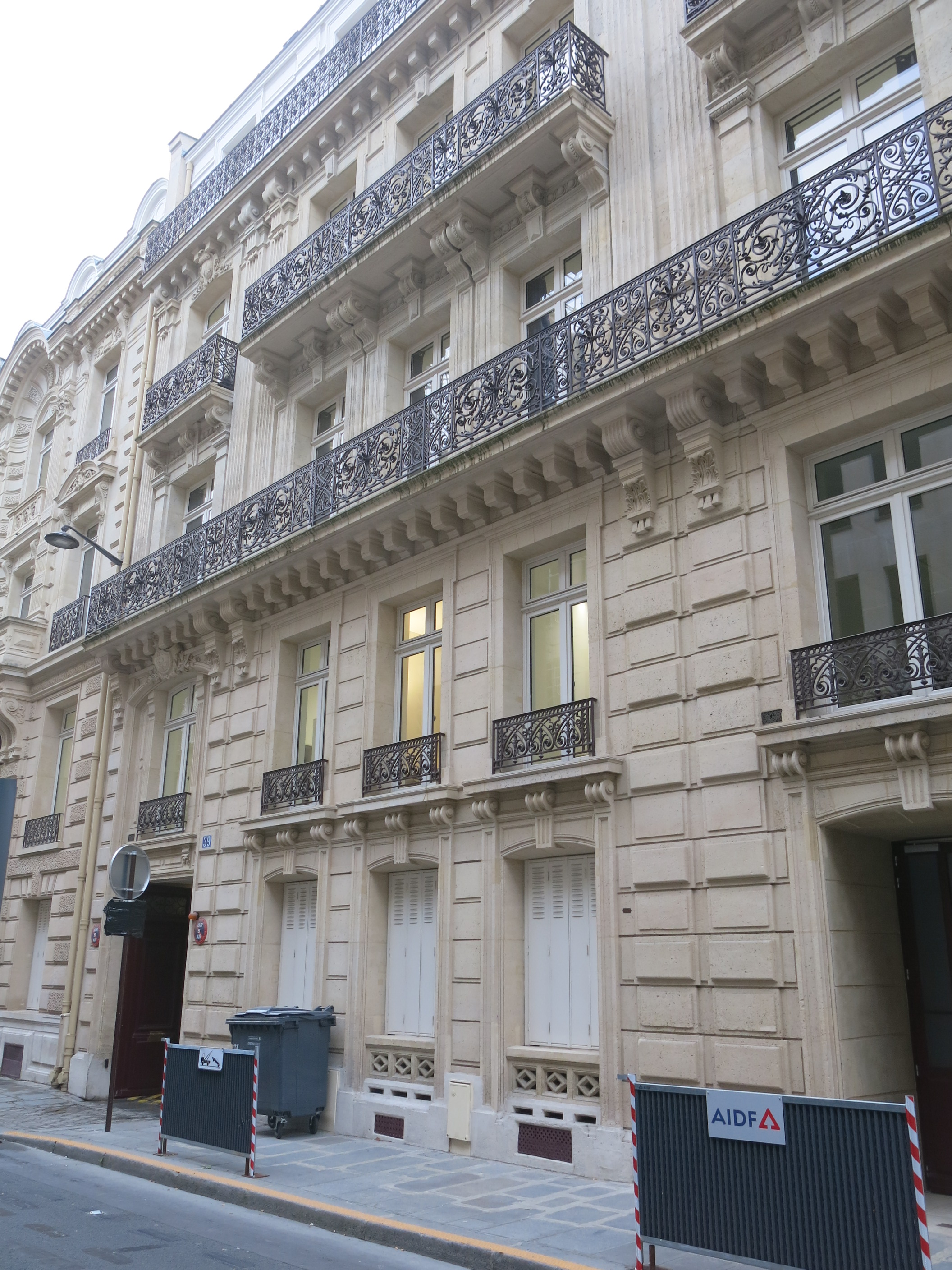
- Getlink head office in Paris
- Type: Public
- Traded as: Euronext Paris: GET; CAC Next 20 component
- ISIN: FR0010533075
- Industry: Rail transport
- Founded: August 1986; 40 years ago
- Headquarters: Paris, France
- Key people: Jacques Gounon (chairman); Yann Leriche (CEO)
- Services: Operation of Channel Tunnel infrastructure; freight rail transport; car shuttle train services
- Revenue: ▼€1.614 billion (2024)
- Operating income: 609,000,000 euro (2025)
- Net income: ▼€317 million (2024)
- Total assets: 9,006,000,000 euro (2025)
- Number of employees: 3,539
- Subsidiaries: Eurotunnel; Europorte; ElecLink; CIFFCO
- Website: www.getlinkgroup.com

Getlink S.E., formerly Groupe Eurotunnel, is a European public company based in Paris that manages and operates the infrastructure of the Channel Tunnel between France and the United Kingdom, operates the LeShuttle railway service, and earns revenue on other trains that operate through the tunnel (Eurostar passenger and DB Schenker freight).

Groupe Eurotunnel was established on 13 August 1986 to finance, build, and operate the Channel Tunnel under a concession granted by the French and British governments. The tunnel was constructed between 1988 and 1994 by TransManche Link (TML) under a contract issued by Groupe Eurotunnel; construction costs would overrun considerably, from TML's original estimate of £4.7 billion to the final cost of £9.5 billion. On 6 May 1994, the completed tunnel was officially opened. Its rail infrastructure comprises 50.45 kilometres (31.35 miles) of double track railway in the main tunnels, plus extensive surface-level terminal facilities at Folkestone in England and Calais in France. The rail network for operation of the Eurotunnel Shuttle train services is entirely self-contained, with connections near the two terminals to the respective national railway networks. Signalling and electric traction supply are also under Getlink control.

In 1995, a loss of £925 million was reported by Groupe Eurotunnel; this was partly due to many of the planned services to use the tunnel not yet being permitted. On 2 August 2006, following failed debt restructuring plans, Groupe Eurotunnel was placed into bankruptcy protection; a restructuring plan that involved a £2.8 billion funding arrangement and a debt-for-equity swap was approved by shareholders in May 2007. That same year, it reported a net profit of €1 million, the company's first profitable year. In December 2009, Groupe Eurotunnel and SNCF acquired the French rail freight operator Veolia Cargo, gaining multiple subsidiaries in the process. In June 2010, the company acquired British rail freight company First GBRf for £31 million from FirstGroup. In 2012, Groupe Eurotunnel acquired three Channel ferries formerly belonging to the liquidated SeaFrance ferry service, establishing MyFerryLink to operate them, although this was discontinued due to monopoly allegations after a brief period. On 20 November 2017, Groupe Eurotunnel changed its name to Getlink. In March 2018, the Italian holding company Atlantia acquired the 15.49% stake of Goldman Sachs in Getlink, for roughly €1 billion.

== History ==
=== Foundation and early activity ===
Getlink's origins can be traced to the formation of Groupe Eurotunnel on 13 August 1986; it was established in accordance with the Concession Agreement of 1986 between the governments of France and the United Kingdom with the goal of financing, building and operation of a tunnel between England and France. Groupe Eurotunnel awarded a contract for the tunnel's construction to the bi-national project organisation TransManche Link (TML). Furthermore, the company employed Maître d'Œuvre to act as a supervisory engineering body under the terms of the concession that monitored and reported on the project.

While TML designed and built the tunnel, financing was handled by Groupe Eurotunnel; however, the British and French governments controlled final engineering and safety decisions, later formalised through the Channel Tunnel Safety Authority. The British and French governments gave Eurotunnel a 55-year operating concession, originally running from 1987; this was extended by 10 years to 65 years in 1993. Private funding for such a complex infrastructure project was of unprecedented scale. An initial equity of £45 million was raised, then increased by £206 million private institutional placement, £770 million was raised in a public share offer that included press and television advertisements, a syndicated bank loan and letter of credit arranged £5 billion. The final cost for the tunnel's construction came to around £9.5 billion, roughly double TML's original estimate of £4.7 billion. This overrun has been attributed, in part, as a response to enhanced safety, security, and environmental demands. Financing costs were 140% higher than forecast.

Construction of the tunnel took place between 1988 and 1994; at the peak of construction activity, roughly 15,000 people were employed while in excess of £3 million was being expended each day. On 6 May 1994, the completed tunnel was officially opened by Queen Elizabeth II and President François Mitterrand; regular services commenced later that same month. In its first year of operation, Groupe Eurotunnel lost £925 million, which was attributed to disappointing revenue from both passengers and freight traffic, as well as heavy interest charges on its £8 billion of debt. The poor fiscal performance can also be partially attributed to the phased opening of the tunnel; various services awaited approval from the Channel Tunnel Safety Authority, some of which did not receive permission to commence until over a year after the tunnel's official opening date.

On 10 July 1997, a financial restructuring plan was approved by Groupe Eurotunnel's shareholders. On 19 December, both the British and French governments officially agreed to extend its concession to 2086. On 7 April 1998, the financial restructuring process was officially completed. On 30 December 1999, as required by the Concession Agreement, Groupe Eurotunnel presented a road tunnel project to the British and French governments.

=== 2000s ===
On 13 February 2004, Groupe Eurotunnel was granted a rail operator's licence in France, becoming the first company ever to possess such status.

In April 2004, a dissident shareholder group led by Nicolas Miguet succeeded in taking control of Groupe Eurotunnel's board. However, during February 2005, Jean-Louis Raymond, the Chief Executive appointed as a consequence of the boardroom coup, resigned and Jacques Gounon took complete control, becoming both Chairman and Chief Executive. During July 2006, shareholders voted on a deal that would have seen half the debt, by then reduced to £6.2 billion, exchanged for 87% of the equity. However, this plan failed, and on 2 August 2006, Groupe Eurotunnel was placed into bankruptcy protection by a French court for six months. In May 2007, a restructuring plan was approved by shareholders, whereby Deutsche Bank, Goldman Sachs, and Citigroup agreed to provide £2.8 billion of long-term funding and the balance of the debt being exchanged for equity, and the shareholders agreed to waive numerous perks, such as unlimited free travel, that they had previously been entitled to.

During June 2007, the company entered into a partnership through subsidiary Europorte 2 with the Port of Dunkirk relating to rail freight traffic. Under this partnership, Groupe Eurotunnel was to operate trains from Dunkirk to the Delta 3 logistics terminal at Dourges, and collaborate on container shipments to the United Kingdom, using the port of Dunkirk via the tunnel.

Following the restructuring, Groupe Eurotunnel was able to announce a small net profit of €1 million in 2007, reportedly for the first time in the company's existence. Half-year earnings for 2008 rose to €26 million (£20.6 million), while net profit was €40 million, despite the costs associated with traffic loss from September 2008 to February 2009 following a fire in the tunnel; this allowed Eurotunnel to issue its first-ever dividend of €0.04 per euro value.

The return to financial health allowed Groupe Eurotunnel to announce, on 28 October 2009, the anticipated voluntary redemption of some of its convertible debt. By anticipating to November 2009 the reimbursement of debt due in July 2010, it aimed to issue up to 119.4 million new ordinary shares, and thus shore up its capital while reducing its debt load.

In December 2009, Groupe Eurotunnel and the French state railway operator SNCF acquired the French rail freight operator Veolia Cargo, splitting the business between them. The company took over French operations: Veolia Cargo France, Veolia Cargo Link, and CFTA Cargo are expected to be rebranded Europorte France, Europorte Link and Europorte proximity and become part of its Europorte freight business. Socorail has not been announced as being rebranded.

=== 2010s ===
In January 2010, the Port of Dunkirk awarded Eurotunnel a seven-year concession to operate its 200 km (124 miles) railway system.

In June 2010, the company acquired British railfreight company First GBRf for £31 million from FirstGroup, to be merged into its Europorte subsidiary. It was rebranded GB Railfreight.

On 11 June 2012, a bid by Groupe Eurotunnel for three Channel ferries belonging to former operator SeaFrance (in liquidation) for lease to another operator was accepted, and Eurotunnel acquired the SeaFrance ferries Berlioz, Rodin and Nord Pas-de-Calais. Eurotunnel was chartered to start the MyFerryLink ferry company on 20 August 2012. After years of legal fights over accusations that Eurotunnel operating a ferry line was uncompetitive, the company stopped operating MyFerryLink on 1 July 2015.

Groupe Eurotunnel transferred its listing from the London Stock Exchange to Euronext London on 19 July 2012.

For the year 2015, statistics estimated that over 10.5 million passengers travelled on the Eurotunnel with 2,556,585 cars, 58,387 coaches and 1,483,741 goods vehicles.

On 20 November 2017, Groupe Eurotunnel changed its name to Getlink.

In March 2018, the Italian holding company Atlantia acquired the 15.49% stake of Goldman Sachs in Getlink and its 26.66% voting rights, for around €1 billion.

In June 2018, Getlink and auditor EY jointly presented a recent study on UK–Europe trade flows via the Channel Tunnel to the European Commission. Findings of this study included that, in 2016, the Channel Tunnel facilitated €138 billion of trade, believed to be roughly 26% of the total trade flows between Britain and continental Europe with an equal balance of imports and exports.

In May 2019, Getlink celebrated 25 years of operation of the Channel Tunnel with the creation of a monumental fresco by street-art artist YZ on the Tunnel's French-side entrance.

=== 2020s ===
In early 2020, Getlink announced the separation of the position of chairman of the supervisory board from that of chief executive officer from July 2020; accordingly, Jacques Gounon remained President and Yann Leriche became CEO. In June 2020, the company dropped its listing on the London stock exchange; it remains listed on the Euronext Paris market.

Following the Brexit vote for the United Kingdom to leave the European Union, Getlink and subsidiary company Eurotunnel made preparations for impending border control changes. Accordingly, an additional 290 truck parking spaces at the Coquelles terminal were constructed, while all the truck controls have been grouped into a single point, the Pit-Stop. Three additional border control lanes at the Coquelles terminal and two lanes at the Folkestone were created. A smart border has been developed in collaboration with Customs and a Customs-SIVEP centre to carry out additional veterinary and phytosanitary controls has been built.

SAS PARAFE, for the identity check of coach passengers, were installed on the two terminals in 2019; furthermore, 300 French and English staff were trained in administrative and customs formalities, veterinary and phytosanitary procedures, checks and document scanning, support and information for customers.

Throughout the early 21st century, French construction company Eiffage has progressively increased its stake in Getlink. During October 2022, it was announced that Eiffage has become the largest shareholder of GetLink by increasing its stake in the firm to 20.76 per cent.

== Operations and services ==
=== Vehicle shuttle trains ===
Getlink operates two types of shuttle trains that transport vehicles through the Channel Tunnel along with two terminals to support the operation of the trains. LeShuttle trains transport personal vehicles and coaches, while LeShuttle Freight transports large trucks. Operations of the LeShuttle services comprise nearly 70% of Getlink's revenue.

=== Freight train services ===
Europorte operates cross channel freight trains and freight trains within France. The company was formed by the merger of Europorte 2 and Veolia Cargo's French operations in September 2009.

=== Passenger services ===
Getlink hosts, but does not operate, passenger train services through the Channel Tunnel. As of 2020, Eurostar is the only passenger train operator that uses the tunnel, offering services that connect the United Kingdom with France, Belgium & The Netherlands.

Eurostar trains are operated by Eurostar International Limited, whose majority owner is SNCF, the national railway of France. Eurostar International is the largest customer of Getlink, which levies charges (currently £25 per passenger per return journey) for use of the tunnel.

=== Electrical interconnector ===
ElecLink is a 1,000 MW high-voltage direct current electrical interconnector between the UK and France, passing through the Channel Tunnel. The 51 km (32 mi) cable runs via the Channel Tunnel between converter stations at Peuplingues in France and Folkestone in the UK, with an additional 14.5 km (9.0 mi) of underground AC cable on the English side to a substation and 3.5 km (2.2 mi) on the French side to a substation. ElecLink commenced operations on 25 May 2022.

=== Samphire Hoe ===
The company also owns the small Samphire Hoe nature reserve on the coast of Kent, England, which was created from Channel Tunnel spoil during construction in the 1980s/90s. The road tunnel down, the ventilation area and the reserve itself are all owned by Eurotunnel.

== Future operations ==
=== Low cost passenger train service ===
In August 2018, Bloomberg Businessweek reported that Getlink is interested in setting up an Ouigo-style low cost high speed rail service between London and Paris, travelling between the railway stations of Stratford International and Charles-de-Gaulle. In March 2022, Getlink was reportedly examining the prospects of establishing its own rolling stock leasing company in order to lower the costs involved in operating trains through the Channel Tunnel and launching such services.

=== Regional rail ===
In September 2020, Getlink announces a partnership with RATP Dev to jointly bid under the "Régionéo" brand name for regional rail services in France which will gradually opened to competitive tendering.

== Rolling stock ==
| Class | Image | Propulsion | Top speed | Number | Built | Notes |
|---|---|---|---|---|---|---|
| Class 9 | | Electric | 160 km/h (99 mph) | 58 | 1993 | Used for LeShuttle vehicle shuttles |
| Class 92 | | Electric | 140 km/h (87 mph) | 16 | 1993 | Used by Europorte for freight services |
| Class 0001 | | Diesel | 100 km/h (62 mph) | 10 | 1992 | Used for tunnel rescues/maintenance |
| Class 0031 | | Diesel | 50 km/h (31 mph) | 12 | 1990 | Used for shunting |

== See also ==
- High-speed rail in Europe
- Irish Sea Tunnel
- National Rail Enquiries
