= International Combustion =

- Company type: Public
- Industry: Engineering
- Founded: 1898
- Defunct: 1997
- Fate: Acquired
- Successor: Clarke Chapman
- Headquarters: Derby, UK
- Products: Nuclear engineering Boilers; Pulverising mills

International Combustion Limited was a major engineering business based in Derby offering products for the nuclear engineering industry. International Combustion Australia Limited was a separate non-affiliated company.

== History ==
The Company was founded by W. R. Wood, an American, in 1898 in London as the Automatic Furnance Syndicate. It changed its name to the Underfeed Stoker Company in 1902 and then to International Combustion Engineering when it moved to Derby in 1922. At that time it concentrated on the production of castings from its new foundry. It acquired Clayton Equipment Company in 1957.

By 1959 it had expanded its activities such that it was awarded the contract to provide the boilers for Trawsfynydd nuclear power station. It was acquired by Clarke Chapman in 1974 and then absorbed into Northern Engineering Industries ('NEI') in 1977; in 1989 NEI was itself acquired by Rolls-Royce plc and they decided to pass on International Combustion to ABB Group in 1997.
