= Crewe Electric TMD =

Railway traction maintenance depot in Cheshire, England

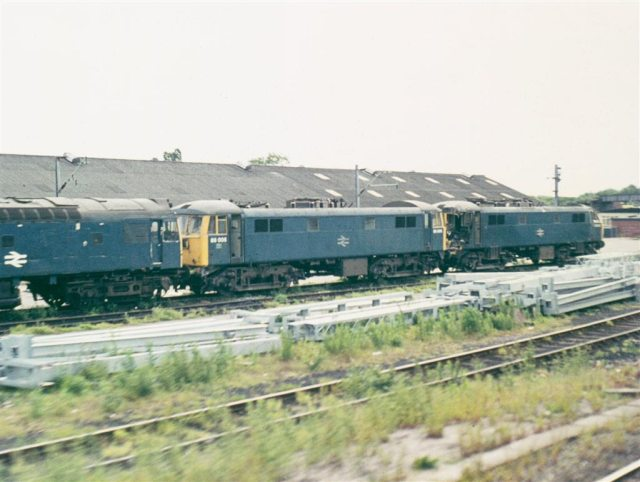
- Locomotives damaged in the Nuneaton rail crash outside the depot in June 1975
- Interactive map of Crewe Electric TMD

Location
- Location: Crewe, United Kingdom
- Coordinates: 53.0974°N 2.4578°W
- OS grid: SJ693557

Characteristics
- Owner: DB Cargo UK
- Depot code: 5H (1963-1966); CW (1973); CE (1973-)
- Type: Diesel, Electric

History
- Original: British Rail
- BR region: London Midland Region

Crewe Electric TMD (officially named Crewe IEMD – International Electric Maintenance Depot) is a traction maintenance depot for AC electric and diesel-electric locomotives; it is operated currently by DB Cargo UK. The depot is situated to the north-west of Crewe railway station on the Crewe-Chester railway line, opposite Crewe Works. Road access is from Wistaston Road.

== Depot plaque ==
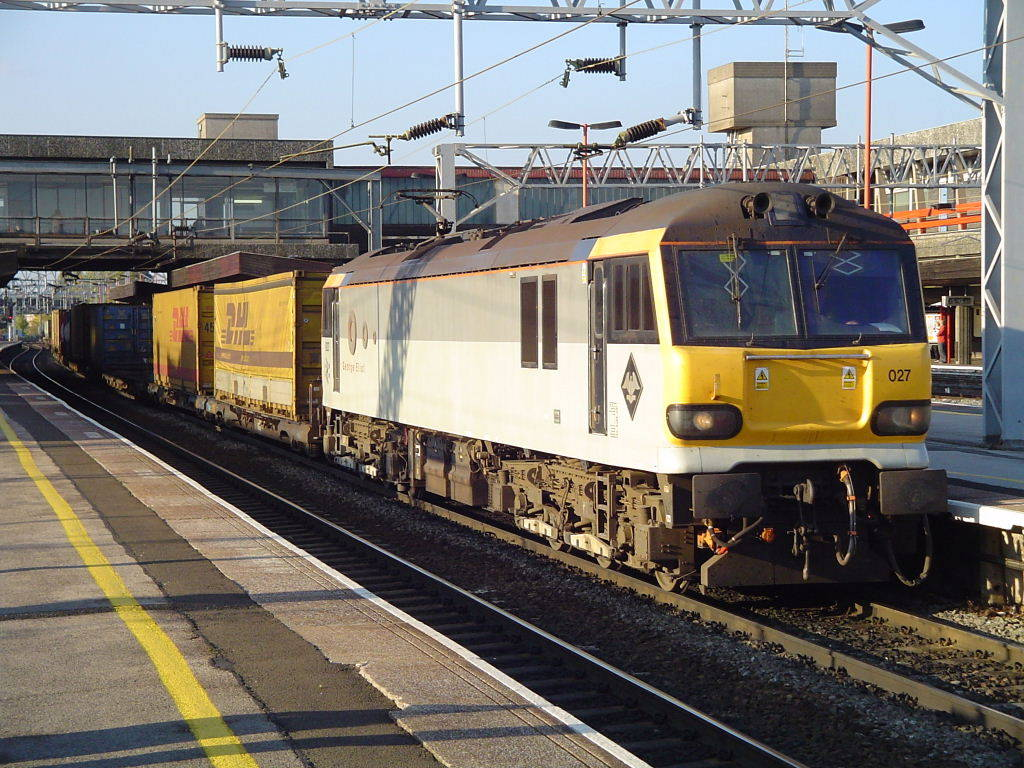
A Class 92 locomotive displaying an eagle depot plaque, fixed below the cab side window

In 1987, Railfreight introduced depot plaques on its locomotives; those allocated to Crewe IEMD carried a plaque depicting an eagle.
