= British Rail Class 92 =

British class of electric locomotives

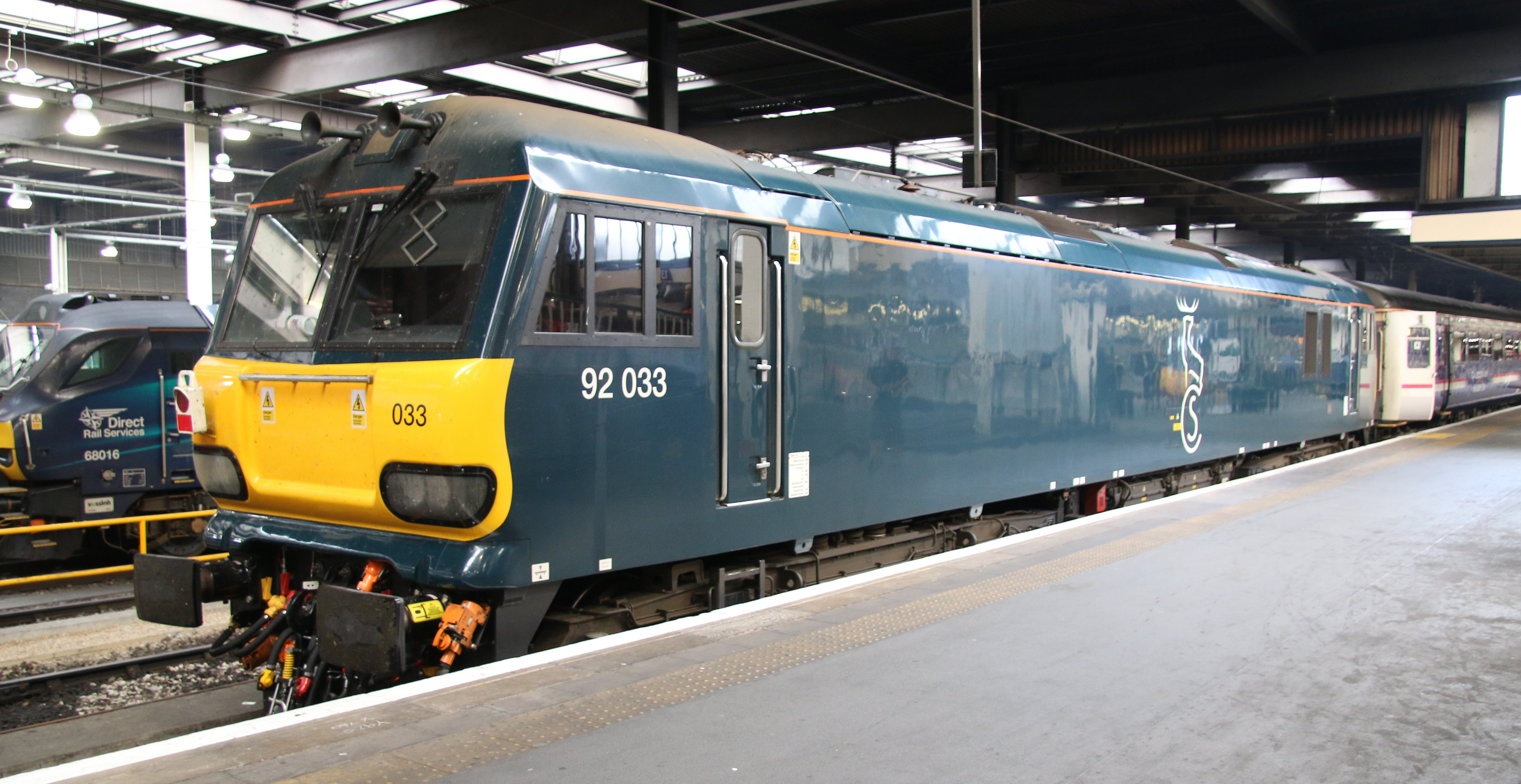
- A GBRF Class 92 in Caledonian Sleeper livery at London Euston
Type and origin
- Builder: ABB Transportation and Brush Traction
- Build date: 1993–1996
- Total produced: 46
Specifications
- Configuration
  - AAR: C-C
  - UIC: Co′Co′
  - Commonwealth: Co-Co
- Gauge: 1,435 mm (4 ft 8 1/2 in) standard gauge
- Wheel diameter: 1.14 m (3 ft 9 in)
- Minimum curve: 120 m (6 chains)
- Wheelbase: 17.22 m (56 ft 6 in)
  - Bogie: 4.29 m (14 ft 1 in)
- Pivot centres: 12.764 m (41 ft 10.5 in)
- Length: 21.36 m (70 ft 1 in)
- Width: 2.64 m (8 ft 8 in)
- Height: 3.96 m (13 ft 0 in)
- Loco weight: 126 tonnes (124 long tons; 139 short tons)
- Electric system/s: 25 kV 50 Hz AC overhead; 750 V DC third rail
- Current pickups: 25 kV: Pantograph; (Brecknell Willis high speed), 750 V: Contact shoe
- Traction motors: 6× Brush Traction; asynchronous three-phase AC
- Train heating: Electric (1500 V, 800 A); On 25 kV: index 180 (900 kW); On 750 V: index 108 (540 kW)
- Loco brake: Pneumatic (tread) and rheostatic/regenerative (Note: The rheostatic/regenerative brake is the primary locomotive and train brake and is used at speeds down to approximately 3 mph (4.8 km/h); below this speed it is blended with the conventional pneumatic brakes. On Network Rail infrastructure, the rheostatic brake is used with the regenerative capability disabled.)
- Train brakes: Pneumatic
- Safety systems: AWS, TPWS, TVM-430
Performance figures
- Maximum speed: 87 mph (140 km/h)
- Power output: On 25 kV: 5.04 MW (6,760 hp), On 750 V: 4.00 MW (5,360 hp)
- Tractive effort: 360 kN (81,000 lb_{f}), 400 kN (90,000 lb_{f}) with 'boost' mode active
Career
- Operators: Current: DB Cargo UK, GB Railfreight, DB Cargo Bulgaria, DB Cargo Romania, Transagent Rail Cargo; Former: British Rail (Railfreight Distribution), EWS, SNCF
- Numbers: 92001–92046
- Axle load class: Route availability 8

The British Rail Class 92 is a class of dual-voltage electric locomotives, which can run on 25 kV AC from overhead wires or 750 V DC from a third rail. It was designed specifically to operate services through the Channel Tunnel between Great Britain and France. Eurotunnel indicates the Class 92 as the reference for other locomotives to be certified for usage in the Channel Tunnel.

Locomotives of this type are operated by GB Railfreight/Europorte 2 and DB Cargo UK. In France, a number were also owned and operated by SNCF; these were classified as CC 92000 on French railways.

The Class 92 was intended as a mixed-traffic locomotive both for hauling international freight trains and the ill-fated, but never introduced, Nightstar passenger sleeper trains though the Channel Tunnel. Since introduction, the fleet was exclusively allocated to freight; however, in March 2015, six locomotives owned by GB Railfreight began passenger operations hauling the Caledonian Sleeper on behalf of Serco between London and Scotland, marking the first use of the class in commercial passenger service.

== Design ==
The fleet of 46 locomotives was built by a consortium of Brush Traction and ABB Traction. Parts construction was sub-contracted, with final construction and commissioning being undertaken at Brush's erecting shops at Loughborough between 1993 and 1996. The first unit was produced from 1992 and finished in April 1993.

The bodyshells, of a similar design to Brush's Class 60 diesel locomotives but with a modified front end, were fabricated by Procor Engineering of Horbury and delivered pre-painted in the then-standard Railfreight triple-grey livery. The traction system was provided by ABB and comprises GTO thyristor traction converters and ABB's then-new microprocessor-based MICAS-S2 modular electronic control system. Maximum power is 5 MW (6,700 hp) on 25 kV or 4 MW (5,400 hp) on 750 V; with a tractive effort of 360 kN (81,000 lb_{f}).

The locomotive is fitted with both rheostatic and regenerative braking, in addition to standard Westinghouse air brake equipment. An electrical train bus is fitted to enable two locomotives to work in multiple formation, either double-heading or push-pull train with a Driving Van Trailer or DBSO.

To reduce the possibility of locomotive failure in the Channel Tunnel, most of the electrical systems are duplicated.

== Operations ==
Prior to introduction to service, two locomotives (92001 and 92002) were extensively tested at the Czech Railway's test track at Velim near Kolín. One locomotive was temporarily moved from here to Vienna Arsenal for climatic testing.

The majority of the class are named after European composers and writers.

Prior to the privatisation of British Rail, ownership of the class was split between Railfreight Distribution, European Passenger Services (later Eurostar UK) and SNCF. After privatisation the ownership of the Railfreight Distribution fleet was passed to the English, Welsh & Scottish Railway (EWS, later DB Schenker/DB Cargo UK).

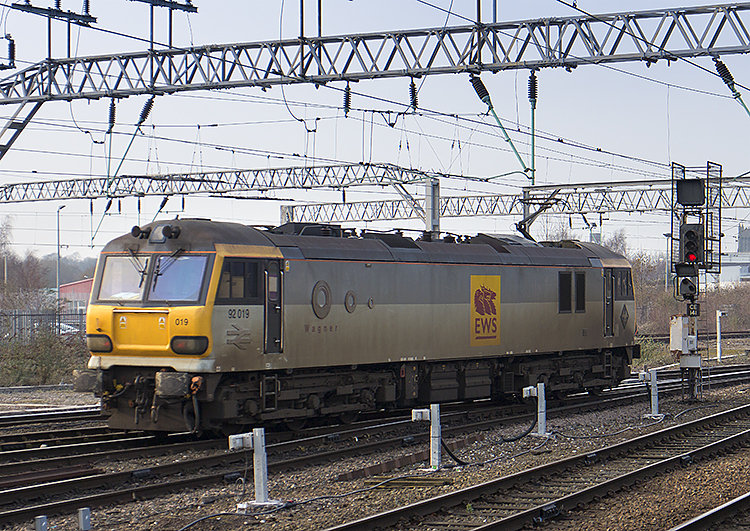
Class 92 locomotive at Crewe

During 2000, Eurostar (UK) offered their seven members of the class (92020, 92021, 92032, 92040, and 92044–92046) for sale, as they were surplus to requirements following the cancellation of Nightstar services. However, no buyer could be found so they were decommissioned and stored at Crewe International electric depot. Five of these locomotives have now been purchased by Eurotunnel to be used by their Europorte 2 rail freight undertaking for short haul rail traffic in France. In July 2011, Europorte 2/Eurotunnel purchased the five remaining locomotives that had belonged to SNCF, bringing Eurotunnel's total up to 16 Class 92s.

In 2009, an upgrade project was undertaken to allow the class to operate on High Speed 1; chiefly by modifying the installed TVM signalling. The project received funding from the European Commission and it was anticipated services would begin in early 2010. On 25 March 2011, a Class 92 locomotive ran from Dollands Moor to Singlewell using the TVM-430 signalling system for the first time. A loaded container train ran for the first time on 27 May 2011 and further trials with loaded wagons were planned until the end of June 2011. In July 2011, a trial run of wagons carrying curtain-walled swap bodies built to a larger European loading gauge was run from Dollands Moor to east London. From 11 November 2011, a weekly service using European-size swap bodies has run between Barking, London, and Poland using High Speed 1.

In April 2015, GB Railfreight commenced a contract to haul the Caledonian Sleeper. Class 92s haul it from London Euston to Edinburgh Waverley/Glasgow Central. On 31 March 2015, the first Serco Caledonian Sleeper hauled by 92018 left London Euston for Scotland.

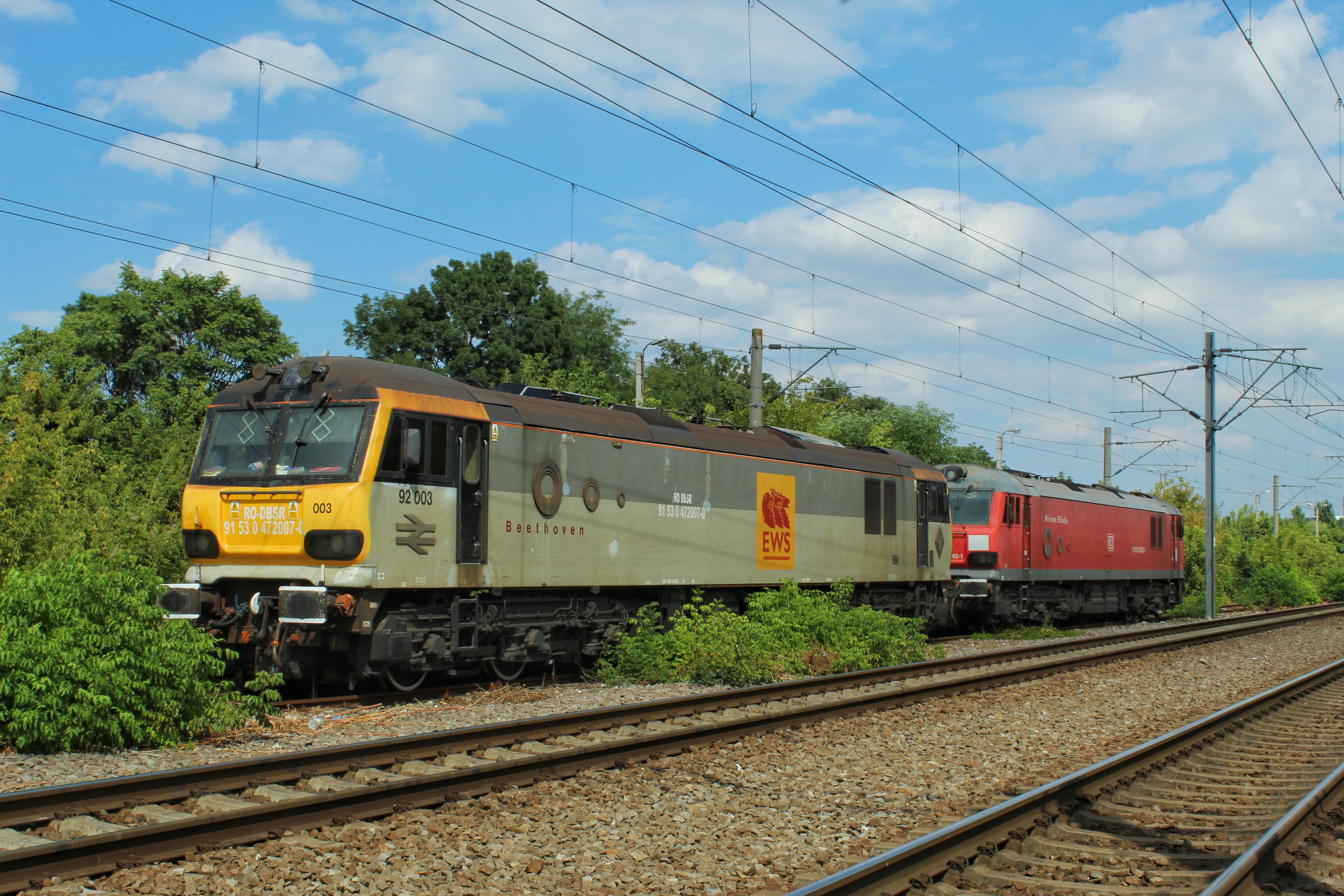
Class 92 in Romania

On 18 January 2017, the specially-branded locomotive 92015 hauled the first train of twenty flatcars loaded with 40-foot (12 m) intermodal containers to Ripple Lane, near Barking; thus completing the first direct rail freight service between China and the UK. The train left Yiwu station in eastern China's Zhejiang province on 1 January and covered 7,500 miles (12,100 km).

In 2018, DB Cargo Romania sold their fleet of Class 92s to Russian company Locotech, on the grounds that the weight of the locomotive was too high for the Romanian railway network (6 tonnes heavier than an Electroputere LE 5100, for example). Locotech rented four locomotives to Croatian open-access freight operator Transagent Rail, and these commenced operations in Croatia in September 2018. Three locomotives (92001, 92003, and 92039) were later returned to DB Cargo Romania.

== Liveries ==
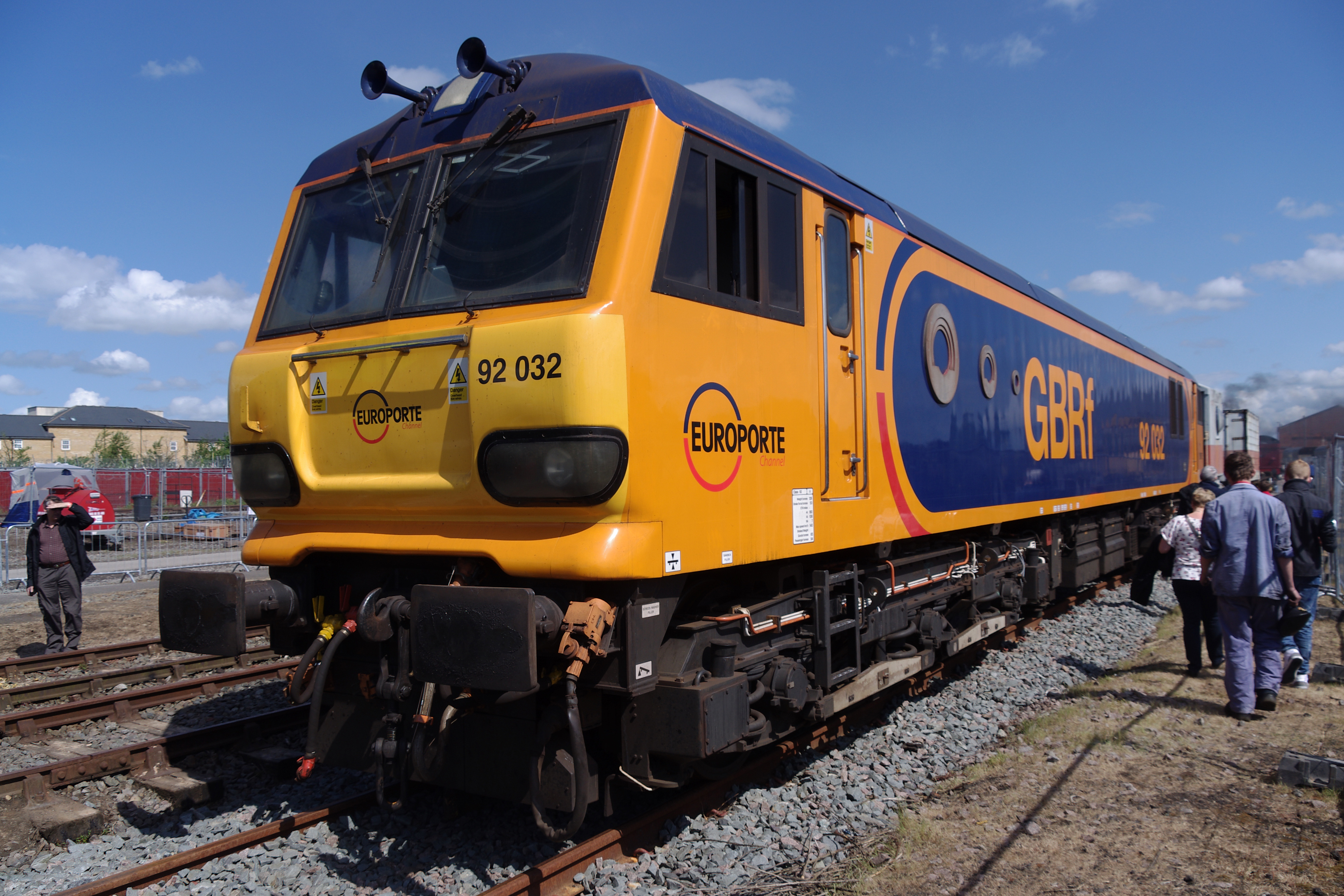
92032 was displayed at Railfest 2012 in newly painted Europorte GBRf livery.

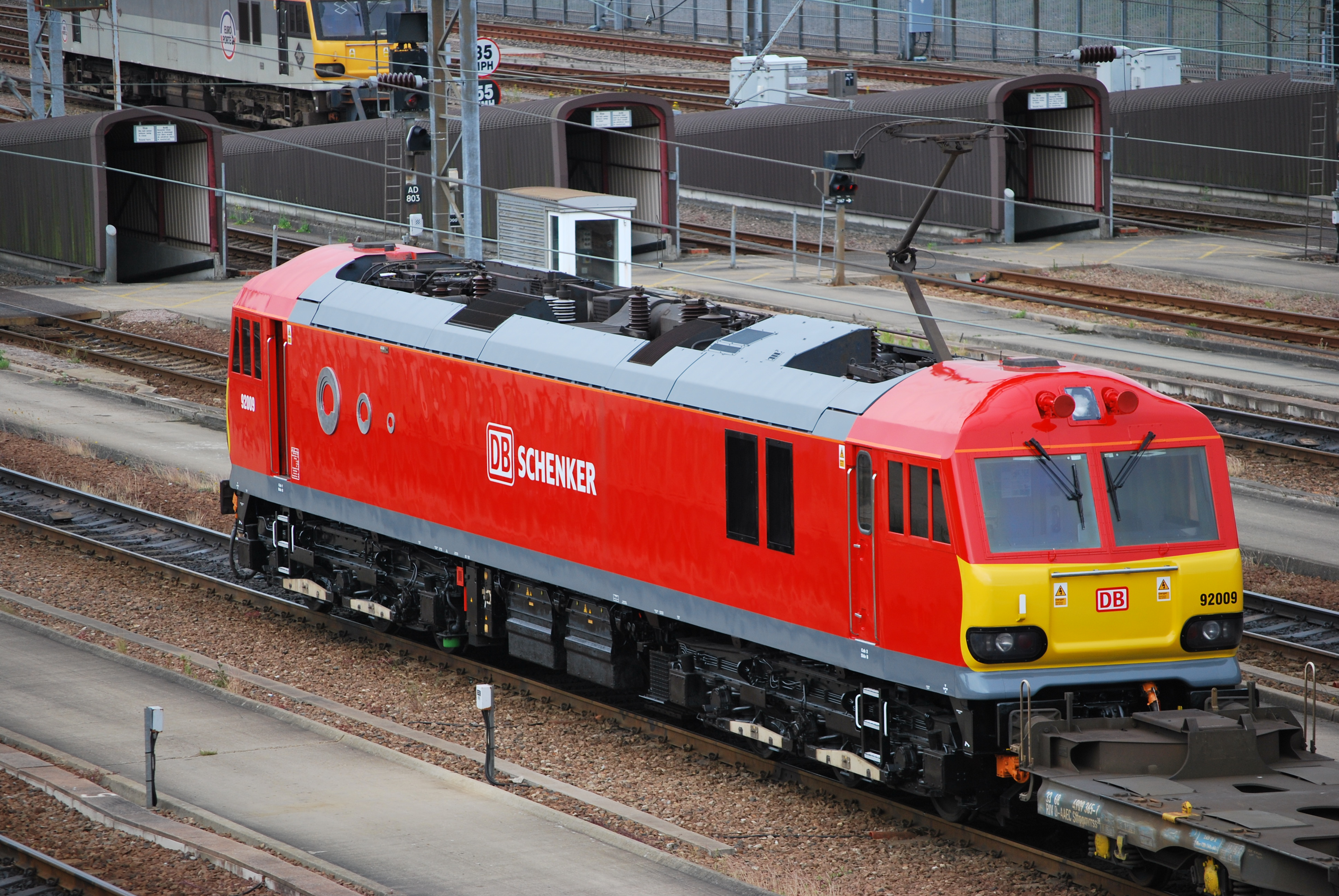
Repainted 92009 in DB Schenker red livery at Dollands Moor, during trials over High Speed 1.

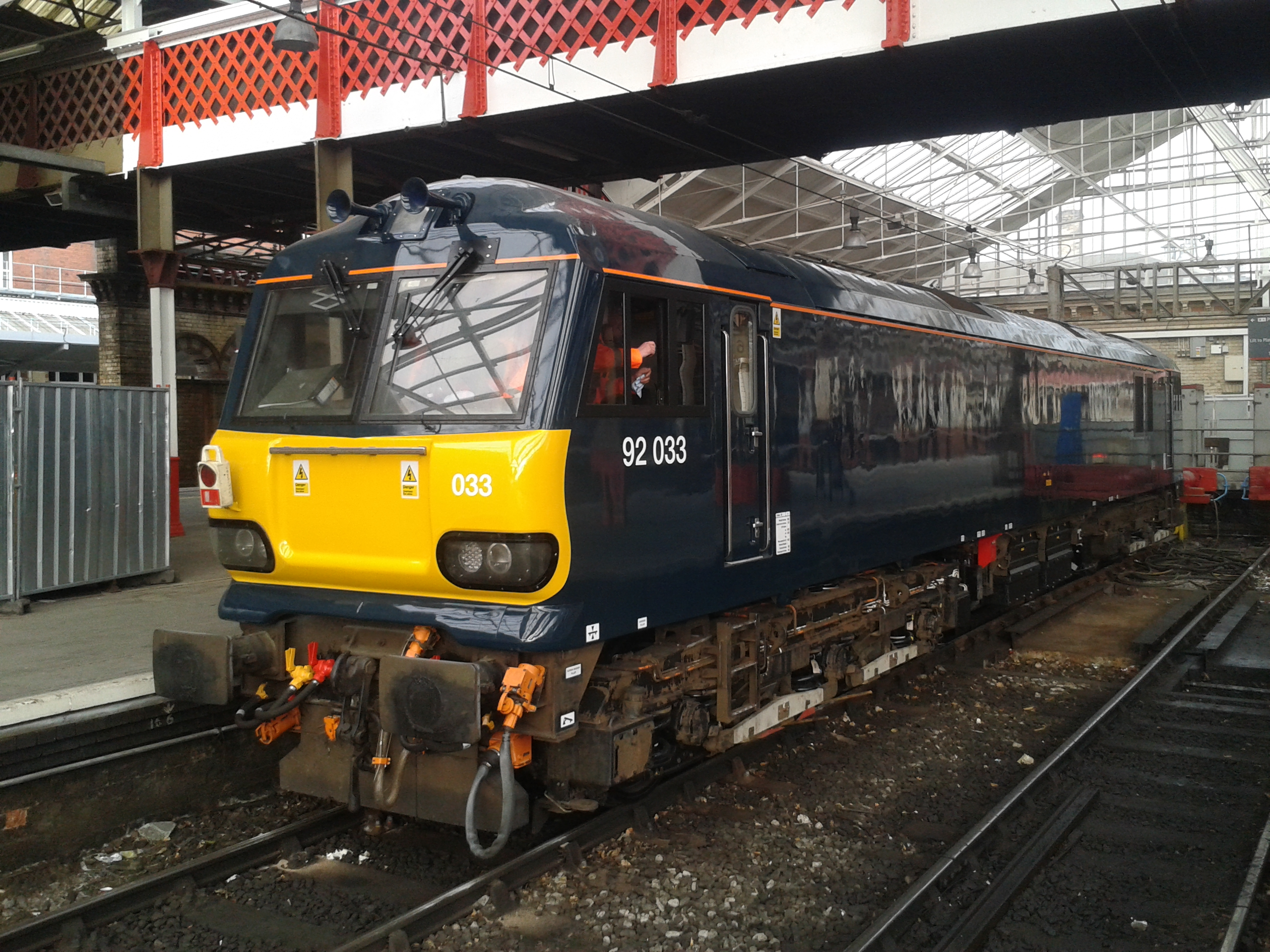
Midnight Teal liveried 92033 at Crewe, having been moved from Brush Traction to Crewe for testing.

All units were originally painted in a simplified version of the sub-sector railfreight livery of two-tone grey livery, but with a dark blue roof; the same shade as used on Eurostar trains.

To reflect their Channel Tunnel role, all were fitted with three O-shaped tunnel logos, each smaller than the next. Names were mainly blue stickers, but a limited number of locomotives gained cast nameplates. Only 92031 did not receive a name during construction, however, it did gain one under EWS ownership.

The locomotives were fitted with Crewe Electric depot plaques to reflect their maintenance facility and to reflect ownership; the nine SNCF owned machines had SNCF branding, six Eurostar owned locos had EPS (European Passengers Services) branding, with the rest having standard cast BR arrows under the drivers window reflecting British Rail ownership.

A number of Railfreight Distribution locomotives had "Railfreight Distribution" written along the locomotive side panels with a small RfD logo included.

Following the privatisation of British Rail and the EWS purchase of Railfreight Distribution, the intention was to paint the RfD Class 92s into the EWS gold and dark red colours. In the end, only two locomotives received EWS livery (92001 and 92031). Locomotive no. 92001 had an additional three flags (English, Welsh and Scottish) below the EWS logo on the cabsides, the only one so treated. The rest of the locomotives had a large EWS Logo applied halfway along the side.

Six Class 92s allocated to Eurostar retained their two-tone grey livery, although there had been a plan to repaint these locomotives into Nightstar two-tone green livery. The combination of rail privatisation, technical problems and the growth of "point to point" low cost airlines undermined the Nightstar venture; the project was abandoned before a single revenue-earning service had even begun. The locomotives remained in two-tone grey until they were purchased by Europorte 2 in the 2000s. Europorte applied the designation "Europorte 2" inside a large Eurotunnel-style circle.

Following the takeover of EWS by DB Schenker, most of the fleet of Class 92s will likely move to DB Schenker Red liveries, matching that on previously repainted Class 66s. 92009 was the first locomotive to be outshopped in the new DB Schenker Red livery. The name "Elgar" had been removed and the locomotive was subsequently renamed "Marco Polo" later during August 2011.

In 2009, locomotive 92017 (formerly Shakespeare) was painted into Stobart Rail's blue and white livery and named Bart the Engine.

On 10 March 2011, locomotive 92032 appeared in the new Europorte GB Railfreight livery.

In May 2014, Serco won the franchise to operate Caledonian Sleeper services for fifteen years from 2015, with GBRf to provide traction as part of its franchise bid. In February 2015, 92033 was first to be released from Brush Traction after component refresh and subsequent repaint into a "Midnight Teal" livery. 92006/010/014/018/023/038 have also been painted into this livery, bringing the total number of locomotives now in "Midnight Teal" to seven.

== Fleet ==
Key:	In service	Stored	Exported

T.O.P.S. Number	EVN	Other Number(s)	Names carried	Year built	Operator	Livery	Notes	Commons Link
92001	91 53 0 472 002-1		Victor Hugo; Mircea Eliade	1993	DB Cargo Romania	DB Schenker Red	Exported	Category:British Rail Class 92 92001 (EVN 91 53 0472 002-1) on Wikimedia Commons
92002	91 53 0 472 003-9		H. G. Wells; Lucian Blaga	1993	Transagent Rail Croatia	DB Schenker Red	Exported	Category:British Rail Class 92 92002 (EVN 91 53 0472 003-9) on Wikimedia Commons
92003	91 53 0 472 007-0		Beethoven	1994	DB Cargo Romania	British Rail two-tone grey.	Exported	Category:British Rail Class 92 92003 on Wikimedia Commons
92004			Jane Austen	1994	DB Cargo UK	British Rail two-tone grey.	Stored	Category:British Rail Class 92 92004 on Wikimedia Commons
92005	91 53 0 472005-4		Mozart; Emil Cioran	1994	Transagent Rail Croatia		Exported	Category:British Rail Class 92 92005 (EVN 91 53 0 472005-4) on Wikimedia Commons
92006			Louis Armand	1994	GB Railfreight	Caledonian Blue	for Caledonian Sleeper	Category:British Rail Class 92 92006 on Wikimedia Commons
92007			Schubert	1994	DB Cargo UK	British Rail two-tone grey.	Stored	Category:British Rail Class 92 92007 on Wikimedia Commons
92008			Jules Verne	1994	DB Cargo UK	British Rail two-tone grey.	Stored	Category:British Rail Class 92 92008 on Wikimedia Commons
92009			Elgar; Marco Polo	1994	DB Cargo UK	DB Schenker Red	Stored	Category:British Rail Class 92 92009 on Wikimedia Commons
92010			Molière	1994	GB Railfreight	Caledonian Blue	for Caledonian Sleeper	Category:British Rail Class 92 92010 on Wikimedia Commons
92011			Handel	1994	DB Cargo UK	British Rail two-tone grey.		Category:British Rail Class 92 92011 on Wikimedia Commons
92012	91 53 0 472 001-3		Thomas Hardy; Mihai Eminescu	1994	Transagent Rail Croatia	DB Schenker Red	Exported	Category:British Rail Class 92 92012 (EVN 91 53 0472 001-3) on Wikimedia Commons
92013			Puccini	1994	DB Cargo UK	British Rail two-tone grey.	Stored	Category:British Rail Class 92 92013 on Wikimedia Commons
92014			Émile Zola	1994	GB Railfreight	Caledonian Blue	for Caledonian Sleeper	Category:British Rail Class 92 92014 on Wikimedia Commons
92015			D.H. Lawrence	1994	DB Cargo UK	DB Schenker Red		Category:British Rail Class 92 92015 on Wikimedia Commons
92016			Brahms	1994	DB Cargo UK	DB Schenker Red	Stored	Category:British Rail Class 92 92016 on Wikimedia Commons
92017			Shakespeare	1994	DB Cargo UK	Stobart Rail livery	Stored	Category:British Rail Class 92 92017 on Wikimedia Commons
92018			Stendhal	1994	GB Railfreight	Caledonian Blue	for Caledonian Sleeper	Category:British Rail Class 92 92018 on Wikimedia Commons
92019			Wagner	1994	DB Cargo UK	British Rail two-tone grey.		Category:British Rail Class 92 92019 on Wikimedia Commons
92020			Milton Billy Stirling	1994	GB Railfreight	GB Railfreight Blue & Yellow.		Category:British Rail Class 92 92020 on Wikimedia Commons
92021			Purcell	1994	GB Railfreight	British Rail two-tone grey.	Harry Needle Railroad Company Worksop Depot.	
92022			Charles Dickens	1994	DB Cargo Bulgaria	British Rail two-tone grey.	Exported	Category:British Rail Class 92 92022 on Wikimedia Commons
92023			Ravel; Polmadie 150 1875-2025	1994	GB Railfreight	Caledonian Blue	for Caledonian Sleeper	Category:British Rail Class 92 92023 on Wikimedia Commons
92024	91 53 0 472 004-7		J. S. Bach; Marin Preda	1994	Transagent Rail Croatia		Exported	Category:British Rail Class 92 92024 (EVN 91 53 0472 004-7) on Wikimedia Commons
92025	91 52 1 688 025-1	88 025	Oscar Wilde	1995	DB Cargo Bulgaria	British Rail two-tone grey.	Exported	
92026			Britten	1995	Transagent Rail Croatia		Exported	Category:British Rail Class 92 92026 on Wikimedia Commons
92027	91 52 1 688 027-7	88 027	George Eliot	1995	DB Cargo Bulgaria	British Rail two-tone grey.	Exported	Category:British Rail Class 92 92027 (EVN 91 52 1 688 027-7) on Wikimedia Commons
92028			Saint-Saëns	1995	GB Railfreight	GB Railfreight Blue & Yellow.		Category:British Rail Class 92 92028 on Wikimedia Commons
92029			Dante	1995	DB Cargo UK	DB Cargo UK Red.	Stored	Category:British Rail Class 92 92029 on Wikimedia Commons
92030	91 52 1 688 030-1	88 030	De Falla; Ashford	1995	DB Cargo Bulgaria	British Rail two-tone grey.	Exported	Category:British Rail Class 92 92030 (EVN 91 52 1 688 030-1) on Wikimedia Commons
92031			Schiller; The Institute of Logistics and Transport	1995	DB Cargo UK	DB Schenker Red	Stored	Category:British Rail Class 92 92031 on Wikimedia Commons
92032			César Franck; I Mech E Railway Division	1995	GB Railfreight	GB Railfreight Blue & Yellow.		Category:British Rail Class 92 92032 on Wikimedia Commons
92033			Berlioz; Railway Heritage Trust	1995	GB Railfreight	Caledonian Blue	for Caledonian Sleeper	Category:British Rail Class 92 92033 on Wikimedia Commons
92034	91 52 1 688 034-3	88 034	Kipling	1995	DB Cargo Bulgaria	British Rail two-tone grey.	Exported	Category:British Rail Class 92 92034 on Wikimedia Commons
92035			Mendelssohn	1995	DB Cargo UK	British Rail two-tone grey.	Stored	Category:British Rail Class 92 92035 on Wikimedia Commons
92036			Bertolt Brecht	1995	DB Cargo UK	British Rail two-tone grey.		Category:British Rail Class 92 92036 on Wikimedia Commons
92037			Sullivan	1995	DB Cargo UK	British Rail two-tone grey.	Stored	Category:British Rail Class 92 92037 on Wikimedia Commons
92038			Voltaire	1995	GB Railfreight	Caledonian Blue	for Caledonian Sleeper	Category:British Rail Class 92 92038 on Wikimedia Commons
92039	91 53 0 472 006-2		Johann Strauss; Eugen Ionescu	1995	DB Cargo Romania	DB Schenker Red	Exported	Category:British Rail Class 92 92039 (EVN 91 53 0472 006-2) on Wikimedia Commons
92040			Goethe	1995	GB Railfreight	British Rail two-tone grey.	Harry Needle Railroad Company Worksop Depot.	
92041			Vaughan Williams	1995	DB Cargo UK	British Rail two-tone grey.		Category:British Rail Class 92 92041 on Wikimedia Commons
92042			Honegger	1995	DB Cargo UK	DB Schenker Red		Category:British Rail Class 92 92042 on Wikimedia Commons
92043			Debussy	1995	GB Railfreight	GB Railfreight Blue & Yellow.		Category:British Rail Class 92 92043 on Wikimedia Commons
92044			Couperin	1995	GB Railfreight	British Rail two-tone grey.		Category:British Rail Class 92 92044 on Wikimedia Commons
92045			Chaucer	1995	GB Railfreight	British Rail two-tone grey.	Harry Needle Railroad Company Worksop Depot.	Category:British Rail Class 92 92045 on Wikimedia Commons
92046			Sweelinck	1995	GB Railfreight	British Rail two-tone grey.	Harry Needle Railroad Company Worksop Depot.	Category:British Rail Class 92 92046 on Wikimedia Commons

== Model railways ==
In 1995, Hornby Railways launched its first version of the BR Class 92 in OO gauge. It has since released a number of models in different livery.

In 2019, Accurascale announced their intention to release a new OO gauge model of the Class 92, with the first examples being available in December 2022.
