= Jacques Gounon =

- Born: 25 April 1953 (age 72); Créteil, France
- Education: École Polytechnique
- Occupation: Chairman of Getlink

Jacques Gounon CBE, born 25 April 1953, is a French senior civil servant and business manager who currently serves as president of Getlink.

== Early life ==
Gounon is a former pupil of École Polytechnique in Paris and chief engineer of the Ponts et Chaussées.

== Career ==
From 1977 to 1981, Gounon was head of the major works district at the Departmental Direction of Equipment of Indre-et-Loire where he took care of the reinforcement and reconstruction of the Wilson bridge in Tours which partially collapsed in 1978.

From 1981 to 1986, Gounon was chief engineer, then deputy director general of the inter-municipal household waste treatment union (Syctom) of the City of Paris. From 1986 to 1990, Jacques Gounon was CEO of the Comatec group. From 1991 to 1993, Jacques Gounon was director of development for the Eiffage group's service activities.

From 1993 to 1995, Gounton was an industrial advisor to Michel Giraud's cabinet, then from 1995 to 1996, he became director of cabinet for Anne-Marie Idrac. In 1996 he also became deputy managing director of GEC-Alstom. In 2001, he piloted the LMBO operated on Cegelec by Alstom.

In 2004, Gounon joined the Eurotunnel Council. On 14 June 2005 he became CEO of TNU. On 9 March 2007 he was appointed chairman and chief executive officer of GET SA. The Eurotunnel Group returned to profits in 2008. He is recognised as the man who straightened the accounts of the Channel Tunnel. From 2007, he launched a new commercial policy and applied the principle of differential pricing, already widely used by airlines. Faced with the return of profits, he launched an investment campaign to increase infrastructure on both sides of the tunnel.

In 2019, Jacques Gounon celebrated the 25th anniversary of the Channel Tunnel and welcomed more than 500 institutional visitors to answer their questions about the Brexit preparations made by Eurotunnel. In July 2020, he became Chairman of the board of directors.

== Prizes and awards ==
- "Revelation of the year" by the BFM Awards (November 2009).

== Bibliography ==
- Jacques Gounon; John Keefe; Jean Gaumy (2009). Eurotunnel: 24 heures sous la Manche. Verlhac Editions. ISBN 978-2-916954-42-4.
