= British Rail Class 17 =

British diesel-electric locomotive

Clayton Type 1 British Railways Class 17
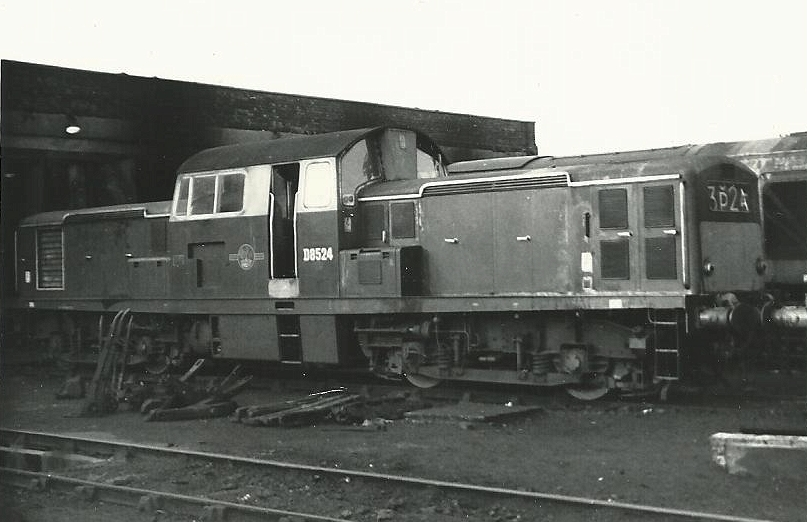
- D8524 in August 1968.
Type and origin
- Power type: Diesel-electric
- Builder: Clayton Equipment Company & Beyer, Peacock & Co.
- Build date: 1962–1965
- Total produced: 117
Specifications
- Configuration
  - UIC: Bo′Bo′
  - Commonwealth: Bo-Bo
- Gauge: 4 ft 8 1/2 in (1,435 mm) standard gauge
- Wheel diameter: 3 ft 3 1/2 in (1,003 mm)
- Minimum curve: 230 feet (3.5 chains; 70 m)
- Wheelbase: 36 ft 6 in (11,130 mm)
- Length: 50 ft 7 1/2 in (15,430 mm)
- Width: 8 ft 9 1/2 in (2,680 mm)
- Height: 12 ft 8 in (3,860 mm)
- Loco weight: 68 long tons (69 t; 76 short tons)
- Fuel capacity: 500 imp gal (2,300 L; 600 US gal)
- Prime mover: 2 × Paxman 6ZHXL; except D8586–8587: 2 × Rolls-Royce 'D' type V8
- Displacement: Paxman: 2× 29.4 L (1,790 cu in) = 58.8 L (3,590 cu in)
- Generator: D8500–D8587: GEC WT800, GEC WT auxiliary D8588–D8616: Crompton Parkinson main and auxiliary
- Traction motors: GEC WT421, nose-suspended, with single-reduction gear (4 of)
- Cylinder size: Paxman: 7 in (178 mm) diameter 7 3/4 in (197 mm) stroke
- Transmission: Diesel electric
- MU working: D8500–D8587 ◆ Red Diamond; D8588–D8616 ★ Blue Star
- Train heating: None; through steam pipe
- Train brakes: Vacuum
Performance figures
- Maximum speed: 60 mph (97 km/h)
- Power output: Engines: 450 hp (336 kW) @ 1500 rpm × 2
- Tractive effort: Maximum: 40,000 lbf (178 kN); Continuous: 18,000 lbf (80.1 kN) @ 13 mph (21 km/h)
- Brakeforce: 35 long tons-force (350 kN)
Career
- Operators: British Rail
- Numbers: D8500–D8616
- Axle load class: Route availability 4
- Retired: 1968–1971
- Preserved: D8568
- Scrapped: 1968-71, 1975
- Current owner: Diesel Traction Group
- Disposition: One preserved, remainder scrapped

The British Rail Class 17 (also known as the Clayton Type 1) was a class of 117 Bo-Bo diesel-electric locomotives built 1962–1965 by Clayton Equipment Company and their sub-contractor Beyer, Peacock & Co., on behalf of British Railways (BR).

During the 1950s and 1960s BR procured a wide range of Type 1 diesel locomotives, many of them under the Pilot Scheme. However, several officials felt that the single-cabbed arrangement used by the majority of Type 1s presented drivers with visibility difficulties in the 'less convenient' direction. BR therefore approached several manufacturers to seek a new locomotive that had a centre cab and low bonnets to maximise visibility. Clayton were selected to produce their proposed locomotive as the Class 17. Its low engine covers required the use of a pair of Paxman 6ZHXL six-cylinder horizontal engines, which had been intended for powering railcars; it was a somewhat unorthodox arrangement for the era.

Production of the Class 17 was undertaken between 1962 and 1965, with the locomotives being assigned to the north of Britain and the Scottish Region. Early on it was determined that the locomotive was not suited to heavy freight trains, and they quickly acquired a reputation for unreliability largely due to the engines, which continued to deliver poor performance even after extensive modifications. The Class 17 proved to be one of the least successful of the Type 1s, such that by 1967, long lines of unserviceable locomotives could be found stored in less accessible sidings at various locations across the Central Belt of Scotland (e.g. Ardrossan and Millerhill). Withdrawals took place from July 1968 to December 1971, meaning some members of the class had a working life of less than 5 years. One was sold to an industrial user, which has now been preserved.

== Background ==
The Type 1 was the lowest power classification for BR mainline diesels. Under BR's 'Pilot Scheme', three different designs of Type 1 locomotive had been produced. Two of these (Classes 15 and 16 under the TOPS classification system) had a layout based on the 10800 prototype, with a single off-centre cab and full-height engine covers, from which forward visibility for the crew was poor in both directions of travel, while the third (Class 20) had its cab at one end, giving good visibility in that direction only.

Having gained experience with these types, although Class 20 was widely considered to be a technical success, BR decided that it would be desirable to have a single-cab Type 1 locomotive that provided good visibility in both directions. The organisation thus approached various locomotive manufacturers with its request for proposals to meet this requirement. Among the companies that chose to respond was the British manufacturing interest Clayton Equipment Company, which had already acquired considerable experience in the design and production of various mechanical elements of existing Type 1 locomotives, and was keen to pursue its own design. Following a review of submissions BR opted to select Clayton's submission, ordering 117 locomotives off the drawing board, and announced to the railway press that these locos were to be the new Type 1 standard.

Production of locomotives D8500–D8587 was performed in-house by Clayton between September 1962 and February 1965, with subcontractor Beyer, Peacock and Company of Manchester delivering D8588–D8616 between March 1964 and April 1965.

== Design ==
The Class 17 locomotive incorporated several features that were relatively novel amongst its contemporaries; to achieve the desired visibility from a single cab, it was decided to place it in a central position and use relatively low engine bays. This arrangement contributed heavily to a key design decision: despite the widespread availability of engines capable of generating sufficient power on their own, the propulsion arrangement opted for was a pair of relatively small six-cylinder horizontal engines, each being placed on either side of the cab. According to the manufacturer, the increased maintenance costs of two engines over a single unit was a worthwhile trade-off for the improved visibility made possible by such an arrangement.

The majority of the Class 17s were powered by a pair of Paxman 6ZHXL engines of 450 hp (340 kW) each – a power unit originally intended for diesel railcars, but not adopted. The last two of the Clayton-built batch, D8586/87, had a pair of Rolls-Royce Type D 450 hp (340 kW) engines. These suffered several crankcase failures, leading to two of the four being replaced by Paxman units. The propulsion arrangement also featured an electric transmission, rather than a hydraulic counterpart; this was a somewhat unusual design choice for the era as the vast majority of contemporary twin-engined locomotives had opted for hydraulic transmissions.

Fuel was supplied from a single tank mounted in a central position. An auto-cutoff system was integrated to prevent overfilling of the tank; several other warning systems, such as for the radiator header tank fluid level, were also present. A total of four GEC WT421 traction motors, each rated for 157 hp of continuous power at 480 rpm, delivered power to the wheels via a 15/66 reduction gear. All four motors could be driven by a single engine, if desired by the driver. The motor armatures were highly balanced to reduce vibration levels; further features included for operational convenience and safety were a relay-based automatic wheelslip detection system, which reduced power without driver intervention, and an automated fire-suppression system that discharged bottled carbon dioxide into the applicable engine bay if excessive temperatures were detected.

The cab featured two identically configured driving positions, one facing in either direction. Large armour plate windows covered the majority of the forward and rear cab walls; in combination with sliding side-facing windows, these provided a high level of exterior visibility to the driver. The cab itself was largely built out of steel, with the space between the interior and exterior surfaces lined with fibreglass and other materials for both soundproofing and heating purposes. Though not included in BR's requirement, the manufacturer opted to include provisions for a steam-heat boiler to be installed in the cab area; this was to enable the Class 17 to potentially haul passenger services, which would require heating to be generated by the locomotive. In addition to steam heating, electrically heated carriages could also be handled by the type. The Clayton-built Class 17s had 'red diamond' control equipment, while the Beyer Peacock batch had the standard 'blue star' type. A maximum of three Class 17s could work in multiple with one another, as well as other types.

The superstructure was divided into three distinct sections: the cab and the two equipment casings. These were carried on an underframe which was entirely composed of welded steel and featured full-length deep-section longitudinal beams, having been designed to withstand buffing forces of up to 200 tons. Jacking and lifting brackets were incorporated to better facilitate maintenance and static transportation. Several pieces of equipment, such as the lead acid batteries, were accommodated beneath the underframe. Provisions were also made for the attachment of a standard BR snow-plough.

== Operations ==
=== Introduction and early service ===
Distribution of locomotives, August/October 1967
British Rail Class 17 is located in Scotland
Code	Name	Quantity
12A	Kingmoor	7
52A	Gateshead	18
64B	Haymarket	39
66A	Polmadie	53
Total:		117

The Clayton examples were delivered to the Scottish Region depots at Polmadie (D8500–D8553) and Haymarket (D8554–D8567), although some later migrated to Kingmoor (Carlisle) on the London Midland Region. The Beyer Peacock locomotives were new to the North Eastern Region at Thornaby (D8588–D8591) and Gateshead (D8592–D8603) and to the Eastern Region at Tinsley (12) and Barrow Hill (1). In September 1963 numbers D8501 and D8536 moved to the Tyne Dock area where they were tested in multiple on Consett iron ore trains. They proved far too underpowered for this work, and so were moved to Ardsley shed a few months later where they undertook a variety of freight work both individually and in multiple. Subsequently, all of the locomotives allocated to the Eastern Region were transferred to Haymarket where they were employed on freight traffic in southern Scotland and northern England.

=== Problems ===
This design was arguably the least successful diesel locomotive ever employed on British Railways, even more so than the ill-fated Metrovick Co-Bo. The twin Paxman engines were unreliable, being prone to camshaft and cylinder head problems amongst others; overall availability was around 60%, even after extensive modifications. Forward visibility, which had dictated the whole design of the type, was not as good as had been hoped, the long noses meaning that the crew could not see the area immediately in front of the locomotive.

Although the two Rolls-Royce engined examples, (8586 and 8587) and the 29 with Crompton Parkinson electrical equipment (8588-8616) had better reliability, no further examples were ordered and BR decided to dispose of the type, replacing them with an order for 100 of the already proven Class 20 locomotives.

=== Withdrawal ===
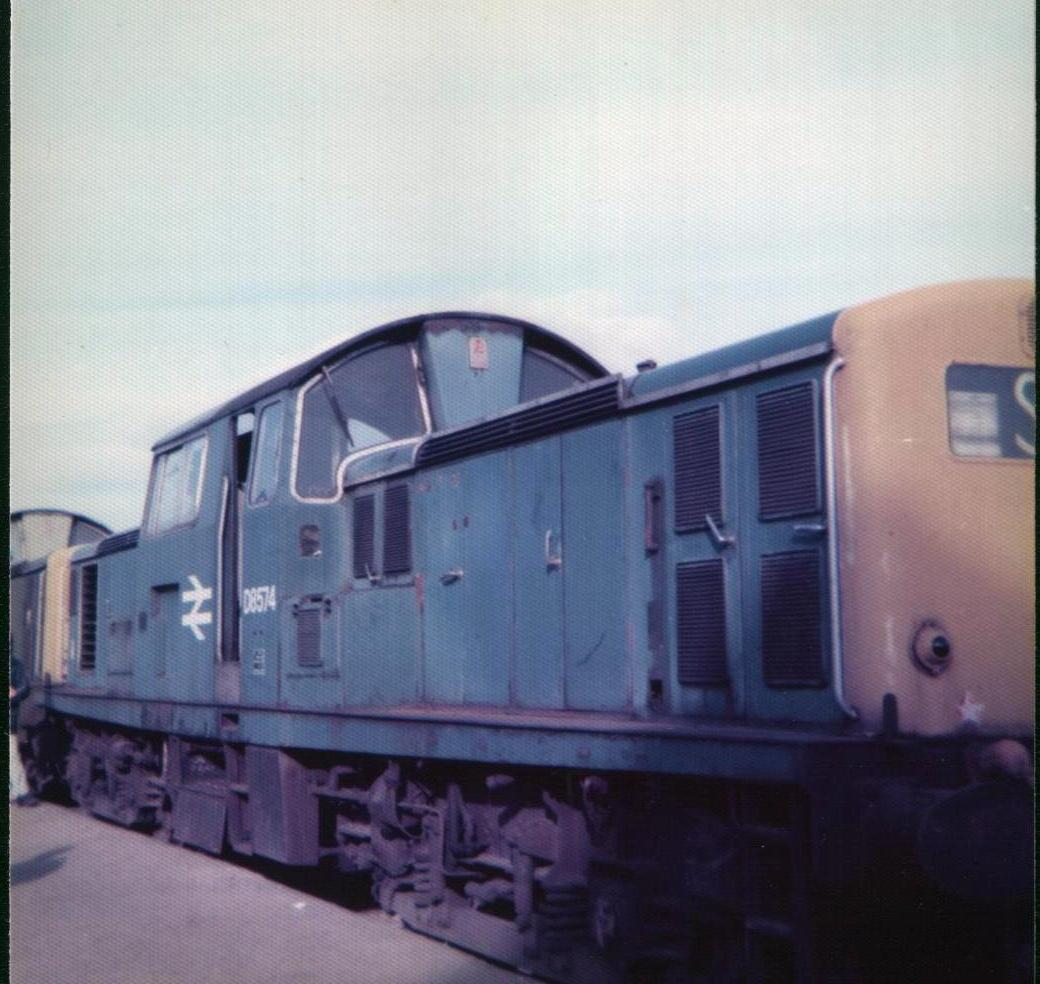
D8574 at Crewe awaiting scrapping in 1971

Withdrawals began in July 1968, and the final locomotives were withdrawn in December 1971. The Class 17s had by far the shortest lives of any significant BR diesel-electric locomotive design, with many examples having a working life of less than five years. Most had been scrapped by the end of 1975. At this time the possibility of converting nine of the remaining locos to battery operation was suggested. This came to nothing, and although D8512, D8521 and D8598 were briefly sent to Derby Research Centre, they were later withdrawn and subsequently scrapped.

== Preservation ==
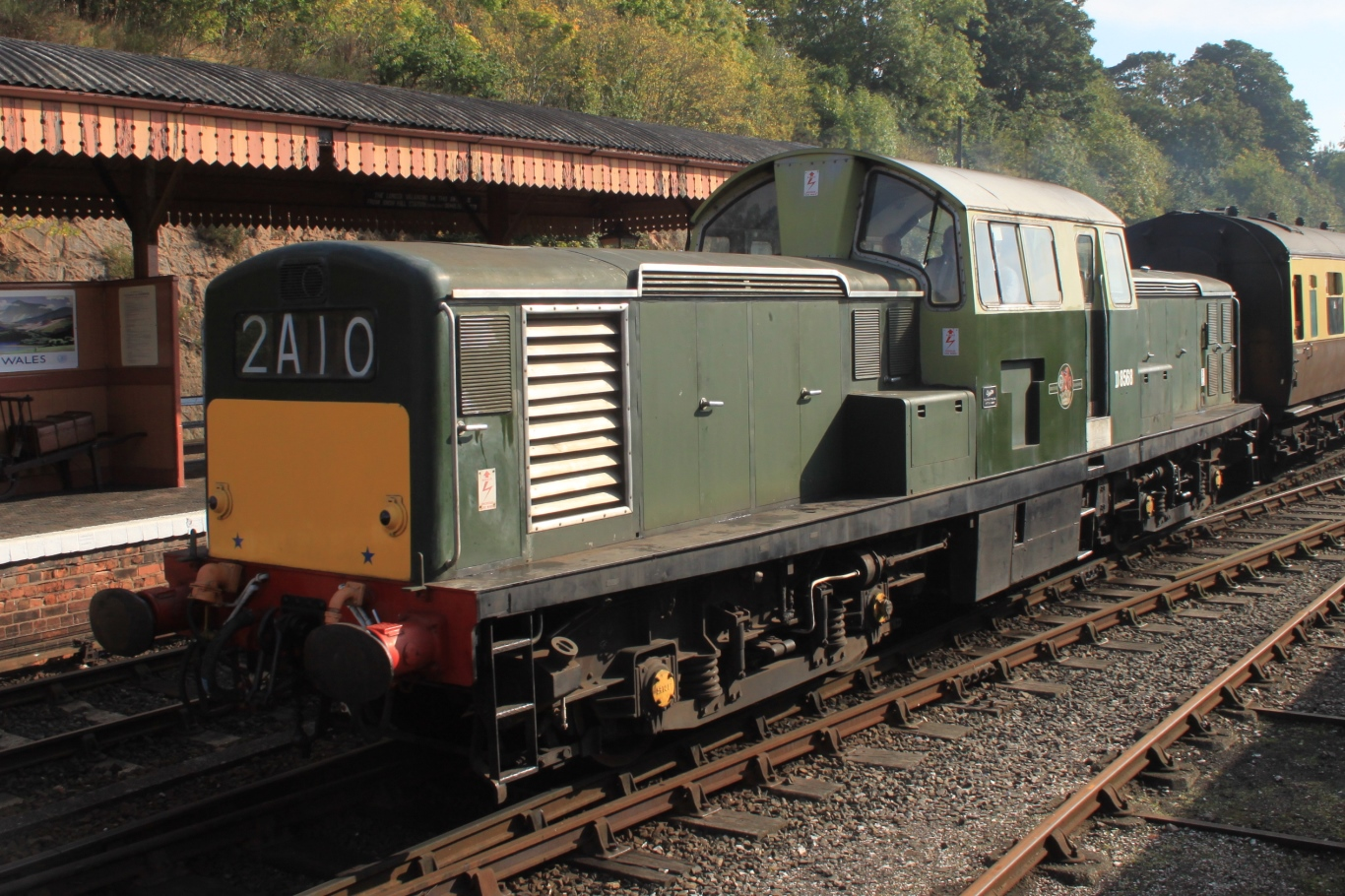
D8568 arriving from Kidderminster

After withdrawal in 1971, D8568 went on to see industrial use at Hemelite, Hemel Hempstead and at Ribblesdale Cement, Clitheroe, and was then secured for preservation. It is often based at the Chinnor and Princes Risborough Railway, but is currently at the Severn Valley Railway following an extensive overhaul.

== Models ==
Danish manufacturer Heljan launched a 00 gauge ready-to-run model of the Class 17 at the 2006 Warley National Model Railway Exhibition. This model went on sale after some production problems in early 2009.

== Sources ==
- Clough, David N. (2009). "Class 17". British Rail Standard Diesels of the 1960s. Ian Allan. pp. 14–21. ISBN 978-0-7110-3373-3.
- Stevens-Stratten, S.W.; Carter, R.S. (1978). British Rail Main-Line Diesels. Shepperton: Ian Allan Ltd. ISBN 0-7110-0617-2.
- Sugden, S.A. (April 1994). Diesel & Electric Loco Register (3rd edn). Sheffield: Platform 5. ISBN 1-872524-55-9.
- Grindlay, Jim (2006). British Railways Locomotive Allocations 1948-1968 (Part 6 - Diesel & Electric Locomotives). Troon: Modelmaster Publications. ISBN 978-0-9544264-6-0.
