= Clayton Equipment Company =

British locomotive construction company

Clayton Equipment Ltd
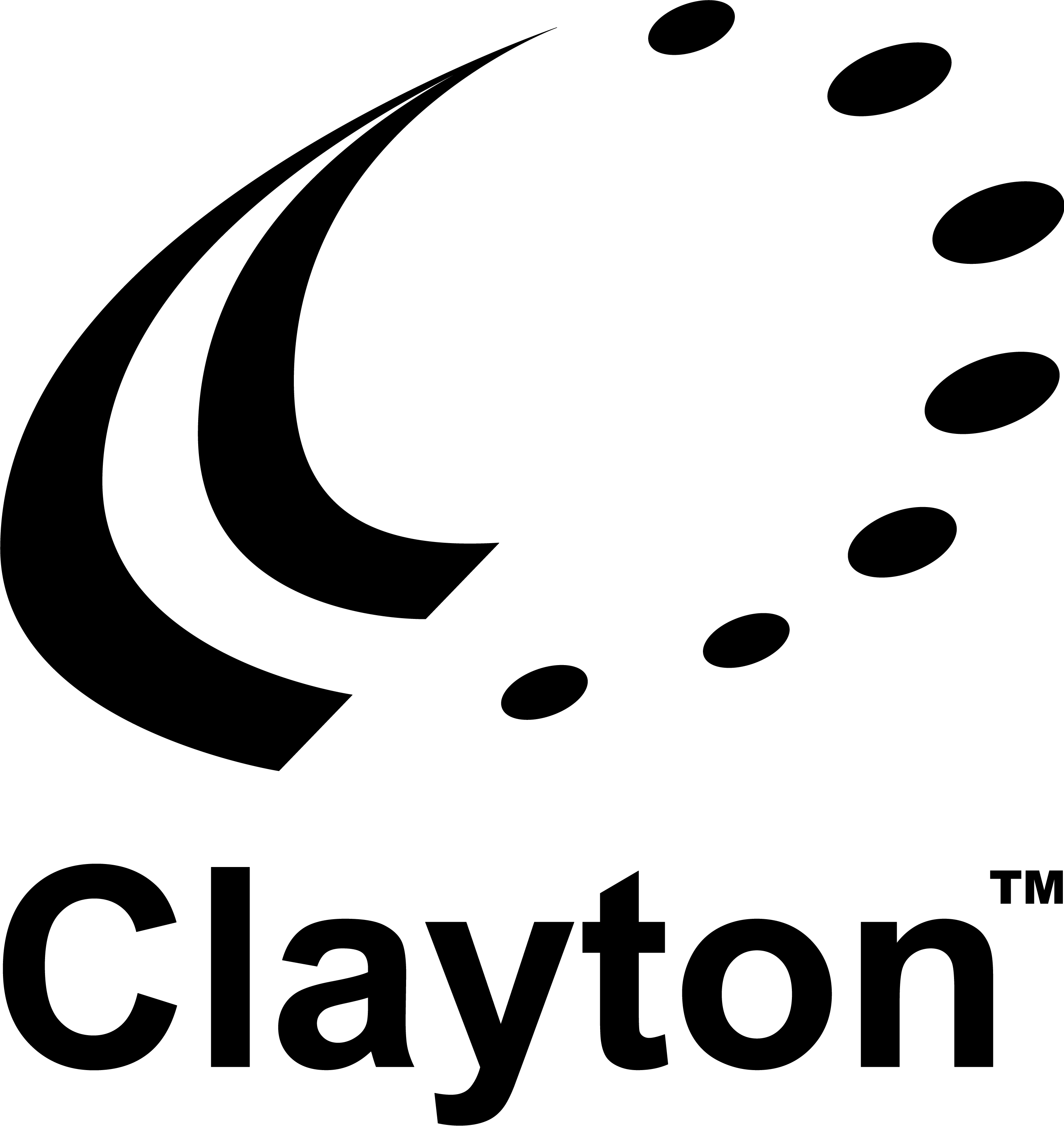
- Industry: Locomotive Construction
- Founded: 1931; 95 years ago Derbyshire, England, U.K.
- Headquarters: Burton Upon Trent, United Kingdom
- Website: claytonequipment.co.uk

Clayton Equipment Company Ltd, also known simply as Clayton Equipment Ltd or CEC and CEL, is a locomotive construction company that specialised in rail equipment, design and build, tunnelling, mining, metro, mainline and shunter locomotives. It entered administration in December 2025. However, in January 2026, the firm and its assets were acquired by engineering company Clarke Chapman.

== Inception ==
Clayton Equipment Ltd was preceded by Clayton Wagons Ltd., a subsidiary company of Clayton & Shuttleworth based in Lincoln, England. As well as railway rolling stock, Clayton Wagons also constructed motive power such as steam-powered railcars, including one of only two steam railcars to operate in New Zealand.

In February 1930, Clayton Wagons Ltd. went into receivership and its Chief Draughtsman incorporated the Clayton Equipment Company Ltd in 1931 to continue supplying spare parts and maintenance for Clayton's products. Founded in 1931 by Stanley Reid Devlin with an authorised share capital of £1000 shares of £1 each. These shares were all owned by Devlin and his wife who formed the company and were sole Directors. The Clayton Equipment Company Ltd, as it was known then, began life as a single person operating manufacturing goods and spares parts for Clayton carriage and Wagon equipment.

== Growth, acquisition, and independence ==
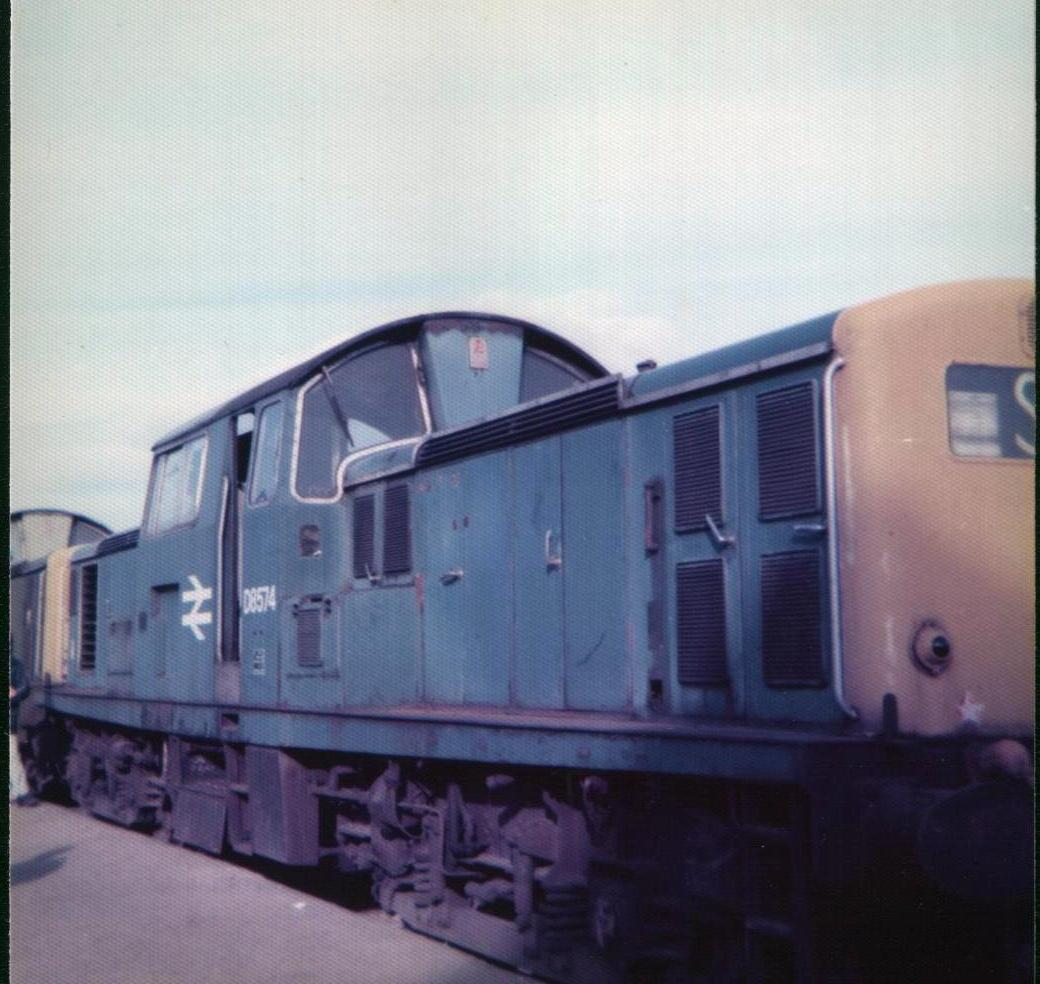
D8574, a British Rail Class 17 locomotive built by Clayton.

After World War II, Clayton Equipment Ltd experienced significant growth as it acted as a subcontractor of International Combustion, constructing various products such as farming equipment and industrial conveyors in response to a post-War shortage. The expansion necessitated the acquisition of new premises Record Works in Hatton, Derbyshire, and in 1957, Clayton Equipment was acquired by International Combustion Ltd.

British Railways, as part of its dieselisation scheme, contracted Clayton Equipment Ltd to supply eighty-eight diesel-electric locomotives (what would later be known as the Class 17), and other orders were fulfilled for international customers from nations as diverse as Australia, Korea, Cuba and Poland. A £5 million contract by British Railways for 88 mainline diesel electric locomotives followed during the same year, supplemented by 1.75 million order for ten 2,500 hp (1,900 kW) models that were exported to Cuba was obtained whilst, at the time, the company sales, particularly of mining and tunnelling locomotives, which were primarily for the export market, also continued to rise. The Cuban locomotives were based on the Brush Type 4 locomotives also been built at the same time.

In 1962, a decision was made by the National Coal Board (NCB) that all pit ponies were to be removed from mines in the United Kingdom. The NCB expressed an interest in using small locomotives to help remove material from their pits. Clayton Equipment supplied a number of these machines which were put into service, before being asked to develop a locomotive that could negotiate steeper gradients.

Devlin retired from the company in 1965. After a number of changes of ownership at higher levels, during which time Clayton Equipment Ltd established itself as a market leader in underground rail haulage solutions. International Combustion was acquired by Clarke Chapman of Gateshead in 1974 and in 1979 Clarke Chapman merged with Reyrolle Parsons of Newcastle, manufacturer of large steam turbines for power stations, etc., to form a new company called Northern Engineering Industries.

Ten years later, Northern Engineering Industries (NEI) was acquired by Rolls-Royce as part of a strategy to diversify its product line into industrial power, and Clayton Equipment became a part of the Rolls-Royce Industrial Power Group in 1989. In 1994 Rolls-Royce plc divested itself of the remaining companies within the Northern Engineering Industries Mining Equipment Group, retaining only Clayton Equipment. Consequently, the company was put under the control of Rolls-Royce Materials Handling based at Gateshead and then later Rolls-Royce Industrial Businesses in Derby. It nonetheless retained a significant measure of autonomy, and in March 2005, it became an independent company again.

On 25 November 2025, Clayton Equipment filed a notice of intention to appoint administrators, which gave the business around 10 days of protection from creditor action while its future is considered. However, in January 2026, the firm and its assets were acquired by engineering company Clarke Chapman.

== Operations ==
Much of the company's orders now come from overseas, from countries such as Ireland and Russia. The company's main products are locomotives for shunting, mainline railways, tunnelling, and underground mining. Power sources include battery-electric, battery hybrid and diesel. It also provides a special design and build service; tunnel drilling machines, cable handlers, overhauling or upgrading existing equipment, converting from old diesel to clean battery locomotives and training services.

== See also ==
- British Rail Class 17
- British Rail Class 18
