= Europorte =

European rail freight company

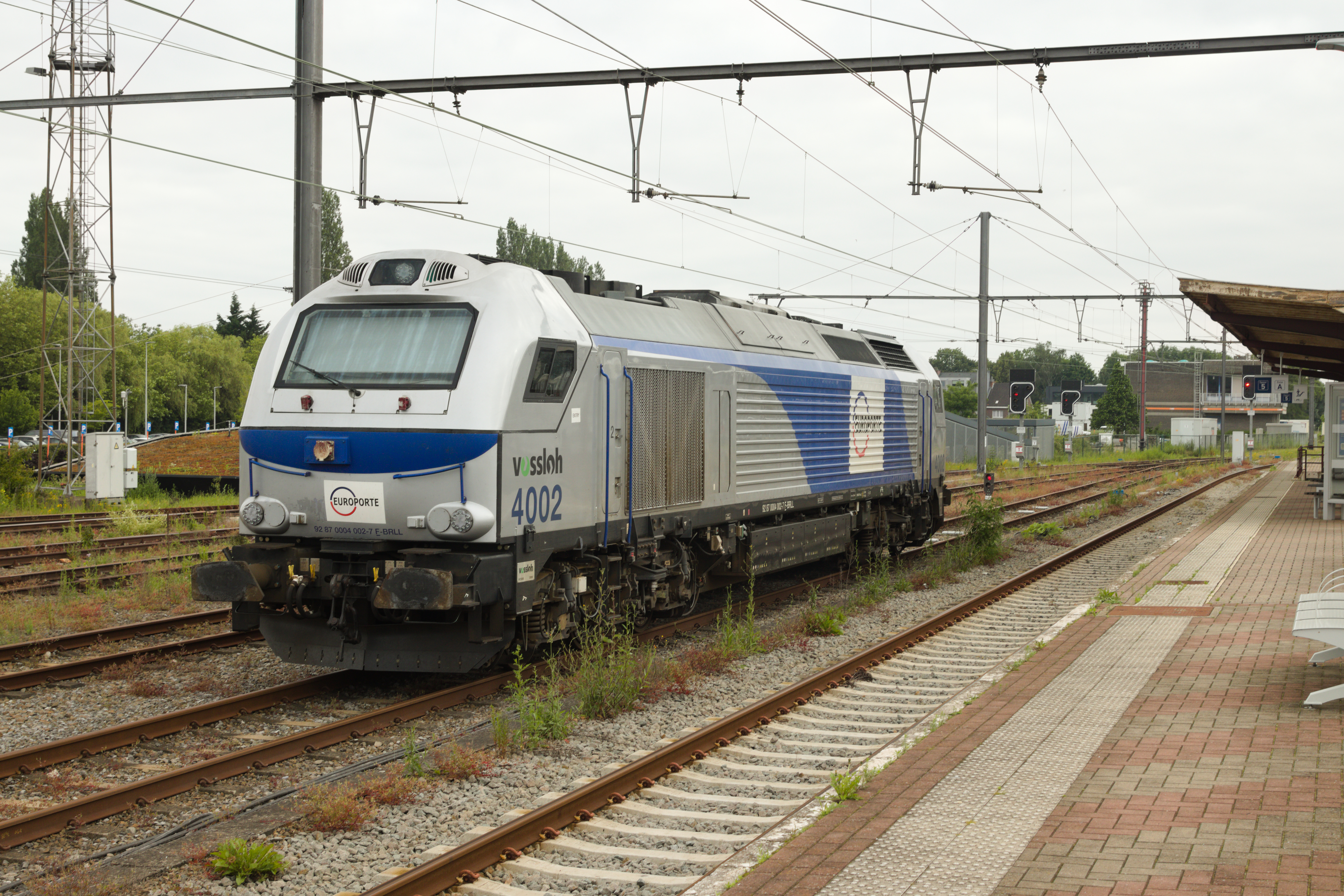
- Vossloh Euro 4000
- Industry: Rail freight
- Founded: December 2009
- Headquarters: Lille, France
- Area served: Channel Tunnel, France
- Operating income: ~€50 million (Note: Figures at time of creation of company (December 2009) from combined companies.)
- Number of employees: ~550
- Parent: Getlink
- Subsidiaries: Europorte Channel; Europorte France; Europorte Proximity; Europorte Services; Socorail
- Website: www.europorte.com

Europorte is a European rail freight company, a subsidiary of Getlink; operating in France and through the Channel Tunnel.

The company was formed in 2009 as an entity encompassing the previous operations of Europorte 2 and the France-based businesses of Veolia Cargo. Eurotunnel's original freight business, Europorte 2, was rebranded to become Europorte Channel and moved as a subsidiary under the Europorte division of the Eurotunnel Group.

== Subsidiaries ==
After the acquisition of Veolia Cargo French subsidiaries in 2009, Europorte had five subsidiaries; one previously under Eurotunnel's control and four operations arriving via the purchase. All of these five units had already held permissions as open-access operators on the French railway network since 2004. (Note: Europorte company website, section "Europorte") Veolia Cargo Link was also acquired as part of the Veolia Cargo France purchase in 2009; (Note: Europorte company website, section "Europorte France and Europorte Link") Veolia Cargo Link operated as a joint venture between CMA CGM and Veolia Cargo from 2006 until the joint venture was terminated in early 2009 due to lack of profitability. As of 2012 the subsidiary Europorte Link is not listed as operational by Eurotunnel.

UK based rail freight company First GBRf was acquired in 2010 from FirstGroup and rebranded as GB Railfreight. The subsidiary Europorte Services was established (2010) as the operating company of the rail network of the Port of Dunkirk.

=== Europorte Channel ===
During 2008 the operation had operated 2718 trains in France and 878 trains through the Channel Tunnel. Its fleet in 2009 consisted of eleven British Rail Class 92 locomotives, and one Alstom Prima electric locomotive. (Note: Europorte company website, section "Europorte Channel") In December 2008 Europorte 2 was renamed Europorte Channel, following the acquisition of Veolia Cargo France.

=== Europorte France ===
Europorte France (formerly Veolia Cargo France) was acquired in 2009. Including those in use with "Europorte Link", the subsidiary has 28 locomotives and operated over 100 trains per week, with a 163 employees combined.

=== Europorte Proximité ===
Europorte Proximité constitutes part of the former CFTA Cargo operation, acquired through the purchase of Veolia Cargo France in 2009. The company operates freight trains on the former CFTA Franche-Comté network, a group of secondary lines in France, well known for being the last place in France where a commercial steam train ran (in 1975). The present network is in two parts, based on Châtillon sur Seine (Côte D'Or) and Gray (Haute Saône) the section of line connecting the two having been out of use for some years. The company operates the former CFTA workshops at Gray, well known for maintaining preserved steam locomotives as well as operational diesel locomotives. It also has a track maintenance arm. (Note: Europorte company website, section "Europorte Proximité")

=== Socorail ===
Socorail was acquired as part of Veolia Cargo France in 2009. Socorail provides services on industrial railway sidings, and operates 61 shunting locomotives. (Note: Europorte company website, section "Socorail")

=== GB Railfreight ===
GB Railfreight was acquired by Europorte from FirstGroup in June 2010 for £31 million. In 2016, GB Railfreight was sold to EQT AB to become part of Hector Rail.

=== Europorte Services ===
In January 2010 the Port of Dunkirk awarded Eurotunnel a seven-year to operate its 200 km railway system. The subsidiary Europorte Services began operating the port's rail network in December 2010.
