= Veolia Cargo =

European rail freight transportation company

- Type: subsidiary
- Industry: Rail freight transportation
- Predecessor: formerly branded as "Connex"
- Fate: sold to: SNCF (incorporated into Captrain) and Eurotunnel (incorporated into Europorte)
- Operating income: 188 million euro (2008)
- Number of employees: ~1200
- Parent: Veolia Transport
- Divisions: Veolia Cargo France; Veolia Cargo Benelux; Veolia Cargo Deutschland; Veolia Cargo Italia
- Website: www.veolia-cargo.com

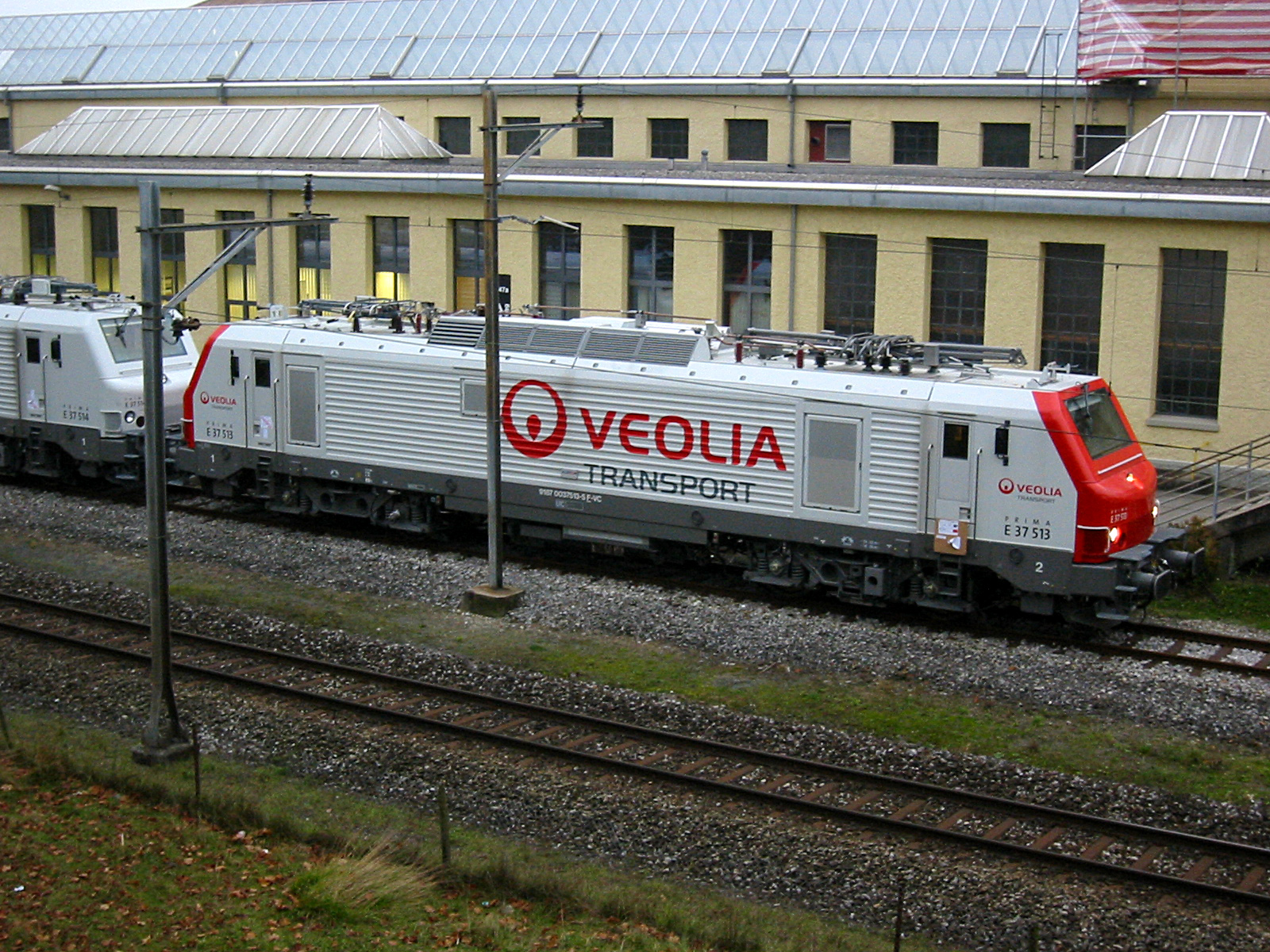
Veolia Transportation locomotive in Switzerland

Veolia Cargo was a European rail freight transportation company that operated mainly in France and Germany. On 2 September 2009, the company was acquired by Eurotunnel and SNCF, the deal being finalised on 1 December 2009.

== History ==
Prior to the creation of the subsidiary company, Veolia Transport operated both freight and passenger trains. The acquisition of 50% of the shares in Dortmunder Eisenbahn in 2005 gave Veolia a significant rail freight transport presence in Germany; as Dortmunnder Eisenbahn operated trains for the industrial giant Thyssen-Krupp, as well as operating the port of Dortmund.

Veolia Cargo was set up as a branch of Veolia Transport in 2006. Previously the rail freight operations had been done under the Connex brand as Connex Cargo Logistics.

Operations in the Netherland also started in 2006, with a contract to transport coal from across the border Germany to a power plant in Rotterdam. Additionally, in 2006, the company later started transporting bioethanol and organic oils (bio diesel, soya oil) by train for Swiss company BioEnergy.

In February 2008, Veolia Cargo acquired Rail4chem. The Italian division was founded in 2008, with the acquisition of C Rail SRL. At the time of takeover, Veolia Cargo owned (or leased) two hundred locomotives and 1,600 wagons, as well as having its own training centres and workshops.

=== Sale to SNCF and Eurotunnel ===
At the beginning of 2009, SNCF and Trenitalia were considered to be likely bidders for the business, the sale of which would reduce Veolia; the parent organisation's debt. The company was sold to SNCF and Eurotunnel in September 2009.

SNCF Geodis took over the business areas in Germany, the Netherlands and Italy; from 11 January 2010, the parts of the company acquired by SNCF were rebranded as Captrain; a brand encompassing all SNCF's international rail freight operations, other freight operating companies owned by SNCF were also incorporated into the brand.

Eurotunnel took over the French operations. The subsidiaries Veolia Cargo France, Veolia Cargo Link and CFTA Cargo acquired by Eurotunnel are expected to be rebranded as Europorte France, Europorte Link and Europorte proximity and become part of its Europorte freight business. Socorail has not been announced as being rebranded.

== Organisational structure and subsidiaries ==
The company was organised into four regional organisations which were built up mainly from acquisitions of pre existing private rail companies.:

- Veolia Cargo Benelux
  - Veolia Cargo Nederland BV
- Veolia Cargo Deutschland
  - Bayerische CargoBahn GmbH
  - Dortmunder Eisenbahn GmbH – primary steel and associated materials
  - Farge-Vegesacker Eisenbahn-Gesellschaft GmbH – railway infrastructure
  - Hörseltalbahn GmbH
  - Industriebahn-Gesellschaft Berlin GmbH
  - Regiobahn Bitterfeld Berlin GmbH – specialisation in transport of chemical and dangerous freight
  - TWE Bahnbetriebs GmbH
- Veolia Cargo Italia
- Veolia Cargo France
  - Veolia Cargo France
  - CFTA Cargo
  - Socorail

=== Joint ventures ===
Veolia Cargo Link was formed as a joint venture between CMA CGM subsidiary Rail Link Europe (49%) and Veolia Cargo (51%) in 2006. The company operated intermodal container trains from the Port of Marseilles-Fos, until the joint venture was terminated in March 2009, due to lack of profitability.

== See also ==
- Euro Cargo Rail – France based open access rail freight operator
