= Citation (disambiguation) =

A citation is a credit or reference to another document or source.

Citation may also refer to:

== Government, law, and military ==
- Citation (police), a type of summons compelling the appearance of a defendant before the local magistrate
- Traffic citation, a notice issued to a motorist accusing violation of traffic laws
- Case citation, the system used in common law countries to uniquely identify the location of past court cases
- Legal citation, the style of crediting and referencing other documents or sources of authority in legal writing
- Unit citation, a formal, honorary mention of a military unit's outstanding performance
- Law of Citations, a Roman law issued from Ravenna in AD 426
- Citation Star, a US Department of War personal valor decoration

== Transportation ==
- Chevrolet Citation, an automobile
- Edsel Citation, an automobile
- Cessna Citation, a series of business jets produced by Cessna Aircraft Company
- Citation Boulevard, a four-lane divided highway in Lexington, Kentucky

== Other uses ==
- Citation (film), a Nigerian film
- Citation (album), a 2006 album by Scott Miller
- Citation (horse) (1945–1970), a Thoroughbred champion race horse
- Gibson Citation, a guitar
- Citation Race Cars, an automobile manufacturer involved in US Formula 1000 Championship racing

== See also ==
- Cite (disambiguation)
- CIT (disambiguation)
- Citation index, a bibliographic database indexing citations between publications
