= CIT =

CIT or cit may refer to:

== Organizations ==
- Center for Information Technology, of the US government
- CIT Group, an American banking and financial services company
- Compagnia Italiana Turismo, an Italian travel agency
- Confederación Interamericana de Trabajadores, an inter-American trade union confederation
- Conflict Intelligence Team, open-source independent investigative organisation originating from Russia

=== Educational institutions ===
- CIT School, a senior secondary boys' school in Kolkata, West Bengal, India
- Canadian Institute of Technology, Tirana, Albania
- Canberra Institute of Technology
- Carnegie Institute of Technology, the former name for Carnegie Mellon University
- Cebu Institute of Technology – University, Cebu City, Philippines
- Central Institute of Technology, a corporate parent of the Wellington Institute of Technology in New Zealand
- Changchun Institute of Technology, Jilin, China
- Changshu Institute of Technology, Jiangsu, China
- Chiba Institute of Technology, Japan
- Chungyu Institute of Technology, Keelung, Taiwan
- Coimbatore Institute of Technology, India
- Cork Institute of Technology, Ireland
- Chartered Institute of Transport, London
- California Institute of Technology (Caltech), Pasadena, California, United States

== Places ==
- Çit, Kemaliye
- Çit, Taşköprü, a village in Turkey

== Science and medicine ==
- Canine infectious tracheobronchitis or "kennel cough"
- β-CIT (a.k.a. RTI-55), phenyltropane-based psychostimulant
- CIT (gene), citron kinase
- CIT Program Tumor Identity Cards, a programme for characterising tumours
- Collagen induction therapy, an aesthetic medical procedure

== Transport infrastructure ==
- Chislehurst railway station (National Rail station code CIT)
- Shymkent International Airport (IATA: CIT)
- Comprehensive Inspection Trains, a series of high-speed test and inspection trains operated by China Railway and Kereta Cepat Indonesia China
- Cibitung railway station, a railway station in Bekasi Regency, Indonesia

== Other uses ==
- Cash-in-transit, the physical transfer of banknotes, coins, credit cards and items of value
- Cit (consciousness), Sanskrit for consciousness or awareness; alternately spelled chit
- citation
- Closed inflatable trampoline
- CollegeInsider.com Postseason Tournament, in basketball
- Corporate Income Tax
- Counselor-in-Training, at a summer camp
- Crisis intervention training
- Critical incident technique
