= NSB Di 8 =

Class of diesel-electric locomotives

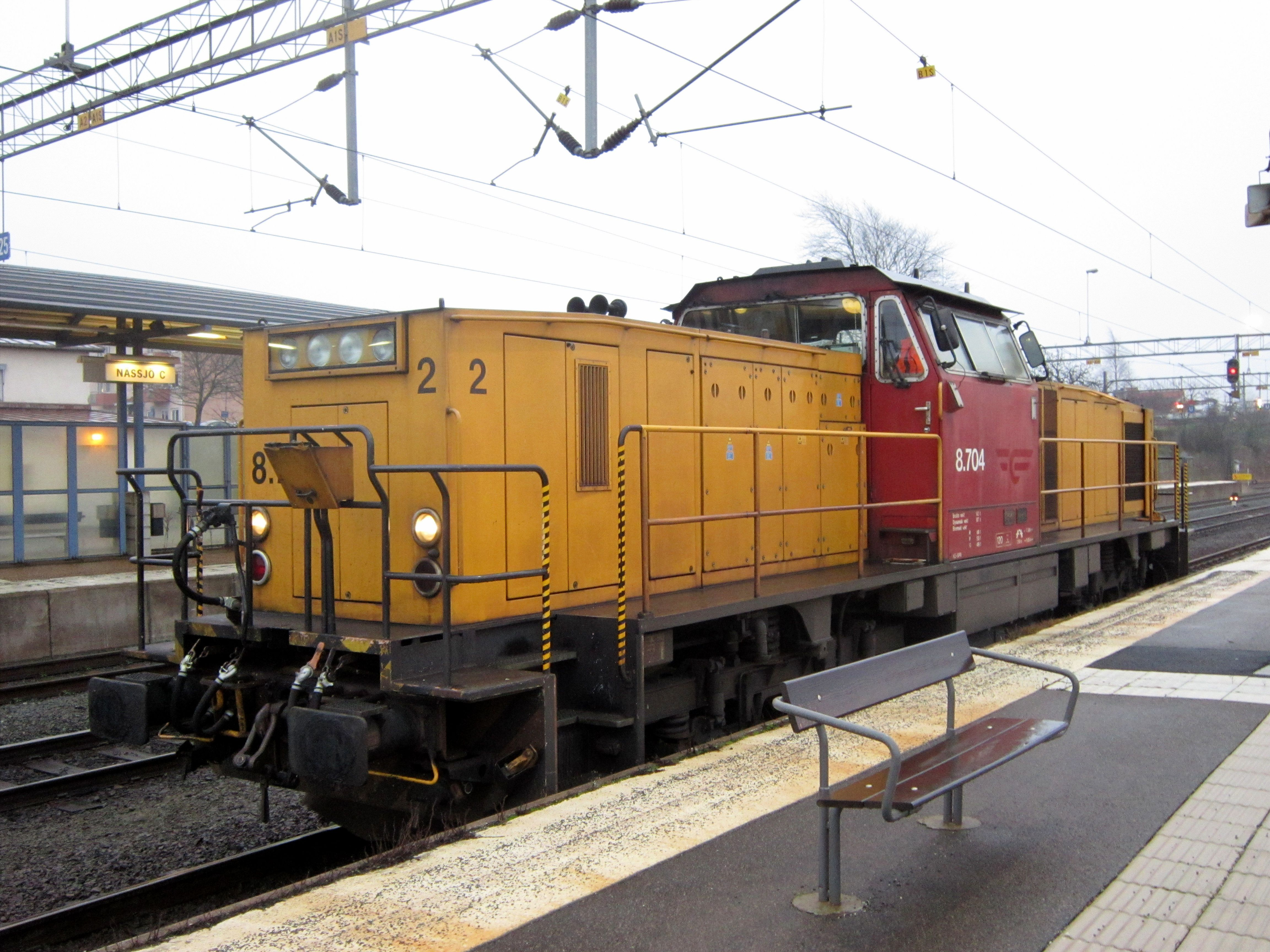
- CargoNet Di 8.704 at Nässjö Central Station, Sweden
Type and origin
- Power type: Diesel-electric
- Builder: Siemens Schienenfahrzeugtechnik
- Build date: 1996–1997
- Total produced: 20
Specifications
- Configuration
  - UIC: Bo'Bo'
- Gauge: 1,435 mm (4 ft 8 1/2 in) standard gauge
- Length: 17.4 m (57 ft 1 in)
- Width: 3.0 m (9 ft 10 1/8 in)
- Height: 4.385 m (14 ft 4 5/8 in)
- Loco weight: 82 t (81 long tons; 90 short tons)
- Fuel capacity: 3,500 L (770 imp gal; 920 US gal)
- Prime mover: Caterpillar 3516 DITA
Performance figures
- Maximum speed: 120 km/h (75 mph)
- Power output: 1,570 kW (2,110 hp)
Career
- Operators: Norwegian State Railways 1997–2002; CargoNet 2002– GB Railfreight 2011–
- Numbers: 8.701–720

The NSB Di 8 is a class of diesel-electric locomotives built by Maschinenbau Kiel (MaK), while it was part of Siemens Schienenfahrzeugtechnik, for the Norwegian State Railways (NSB). The locomotives are equipped with a Caterpillar 3516 DI-TA prime mover, which provides a power output of 1,570 kilowatts (2,110 hp) and a starting tractive effort of 270 kilonewtons (61,000 lb_{f}).

Twenty locomotives were delivered in 1996, largely based on MaK's previous production series, the Dutch NS Class 6400 and German DE 1002, although receiving some upgrades to the specifications. NSB took delivery of the class to replace the aging Di 3, and the units have been used on freight trains on un-electrified lines, including the Nordland Line and the Røros Line. They were transferred to CargoNet in 2002, when NSB's cargo division was demerged. Ten units were sold to GB Railfreight in 2011 and are used at the Scunthorpe Steel works in Scunthorpe, United Kingdom.

== History ==
During the late 1980s, the Norwegian State Railways sought a new locomotive type to replace its aging fleet of Di 3 diesel-electric locomotives, which made up the back-bone of the dieselized operations. The new locomotives were planned for use as freight and passenger trains on the Nordland Line, and to a lesser extent on the Røros Line. In 1980, NSB had taken delivery of five Di 4 from Henschel. Originally there were plans to order additional Di 4 units, but this was discarded and instead a new class was pursued, as NSB wanted similar, but slightly more modern, locomotives.

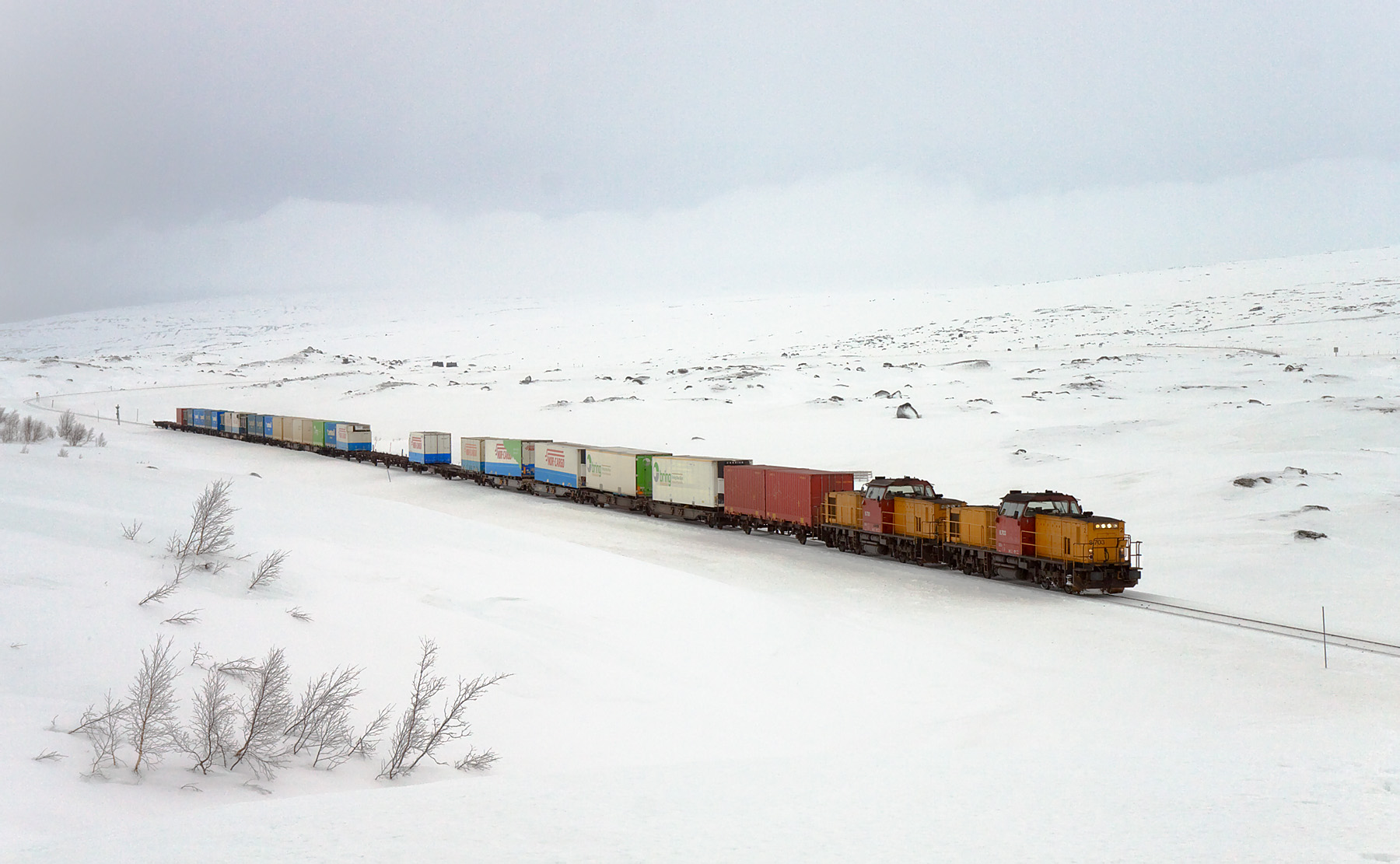
Twin Di 8 unit hauling a CargoNet freight train across Saltfjellet on the Nordland Line

A MaK-built DB Class 240 locomotive was test-run in Norway during 1990. On 23 November 1992, NSB's board decided to order ten similar units, later expanded to twelve, which would primarily be used in passenger trains. During the procurement process, NSB started to pursue the smaller locomotives for freight trains, and turned to MaK to investigate their smaller locomotives. NSB's need for hauling power was dire enough that the company leased two locomotives of two classes of diesel-electric locomotives, the SJ T44 from the Swedish State Railways and the MaK-built NS 6400 from Nederlandse Spoorwegen.

The NS 6400 was built through a cooperation between MaK and Brown, Boveri & Cie in Mannheim, with 120 units having been built between 1988 and 1992. It was again based on the DE 1002, which had been built in twenty-four copies for the Häfen und Güterverkehr Köln 1982 and 1993. Another variant of the DE 1002 and NS 6400 is the Eurotunnel Class 0001, built in 1991. The Di 8 was technically similar, although slightly larger and more powerful, than the Dutch and German variants.

Delivery of both the Di 6 and 8 commenced in 1996. The first Di 8 was delivered on 8 June 1996 and the last on 10 June 1997. NSB hoped that the combined 32 locos would be sufficient to replace all the Di 3s. However, the Di 8s were at first put into use on freight trains in Eastern Norway, largely running on electrified lines and thus not replacing the Di 3. Unlike their larger counterparts, which were unsuitable for service and returned to the manufacturer, the Di 8 proved a sufficiently reliable to remain in operation. The Di 8s were gradually introduced on the Nordland Line and Meråker Line to replace the Di 3 on freight trains. The Di 8 operated in pairs, which proved to be an optimal power ratio and driving times on the Nordland Line. On the other hand, the locomotives had high operating costs, in part because of the twin configuration, and proved less reliable than NSB had hoped.

No. 714 was plagued with operational problems because of errors in a generator. Delivered in January 1997, it was retired in late 2000 and started being used for parts from 2002. This makes it one of the shortest-serving locomotives in NSB's service. NSB's initial motivation for the smaller units was to haul conventional local freight trains and affiliated heavy-duty shunting. With the reorganization of the railways during the late 1990s and early 2000s, this job fell out of use, making the locomotives poorly suited for NSB's network. The locomotives passed to CargoNet in 2002, after the split of Norwegian State Railways (NSB) into passenger and freight companies. From the mid-2000s CargoNet started looking for a replacement for the Di 8 in the freight trains, especially for on the Nordland Line. The company decided to lease six EMD Class 66 units, which entered service in Norway in 2005. The Di 8 remained in service, but in other trains.

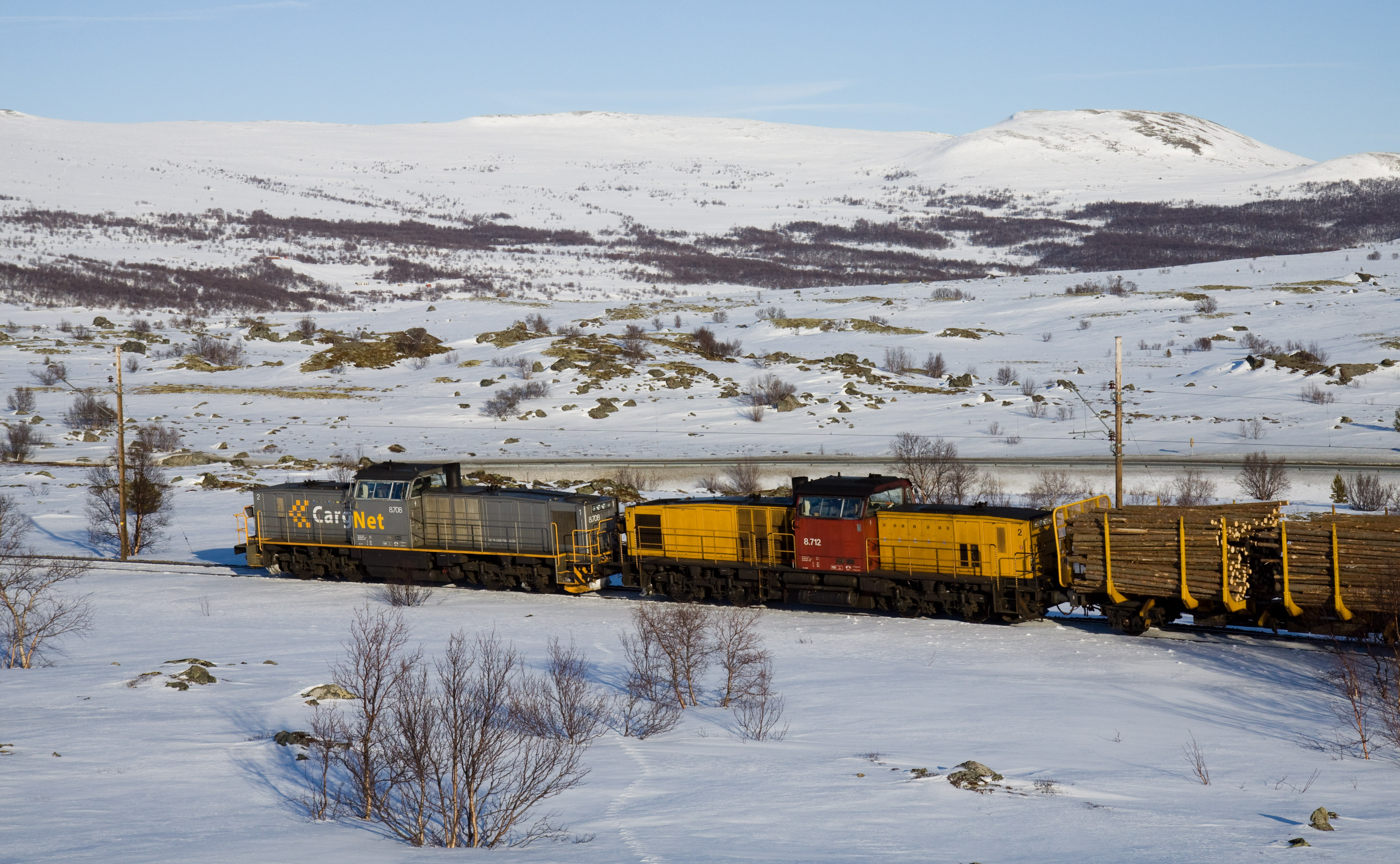
Two CargoNet units, in new and original livery, hauling a lumber train near Hjerkinn on the Dovre Line

On 4 April 2011, a fire broke out on a Di 8 locomotive at Kløfta on the Trunk Line while hauling a 16-wagon train of jet fuel to Oslo Airport, Gardermoen. The fire started in an electrical cabinet after a diesel pipe running over it had cracked. The fire fighting was complicated by the train dispatcher not wanting to disconnect the overhead wire power as he thought it was an electric train. The damages were so severe that the locomotive was scrapped. The Accident Investigation Board Norway criticized CargoNet for not having sufficient maintenance routines for diesel pipes, as they were neither part of the maintenance procedure nor where there specified intervals for replacement.

With the delivery of the Class 66 and later the Vossloh Euro, CargoNet's need for the uneconomical and underdimensioned Di 8 fell through. The Euro was put into service on the Nordland Line and the Rauma Line, and NSB started looking for a possibility to sell the locomotives. In October 2011, GB Railfreight was awarded the contract for the operation of the railway after Sahaviriya Steel Industries had bought and reopened Teesside Steelworks in Redcar, United Kingdom. They were thus in need for locomotives to haul the internal torpedo trains with liquid steel between the steelwork's blast furnaces and continuous casters. Ten Di 8s were thereby sold, of which the first five were shipped on 12 December 2011, and arrived on 20 December, and the last were delivered in January 2012. Eight of the ten locomotives will be used in revenue service; the other two will be used for parts. At that point, seven Di 8s remained in service with CargoNet, with one having been retired and one used for parts. No. 714 was, as the first Di 8, scrapped on 10 July 2013.

On closure of Teesside Steelworks in 2015, the locos were leased to Tata Steel (now British Steel) for use at their Scunthorpe works to replace the ageing Janus fleet

=== Fleet List ===
NSB Number	Status	Operator	Country
8.701	In service	Scunthorpe Steelworks	UK
8.702	In service	Scunthorpe Steelworks	UK
8.703	In service	Scunthorpe Steelworks	UK
8.704	In service	Scunthorpe Steelworks	UK
8.705	In service	NSB Berging og Beredskap AS	Norway
8.706	In service	NSB Berging og Beredskap AS	Norway
8.707	In service	NSB Berging og Beredskap AS	Norway
8.708	In service	Scunthorpe Steelworks	UK
8.709	In service	NSB AS	Norway
8.710	In service	NSB AS	Norway
8.711	Out of service, for parts	British Steel, Redcar	UK
8.712	Out of service	Scunthorpe Steelworks	UK
8.713	In service	NSB Berging og Beredskap AS	Norway
8.714	Scrapped (reliability issues)	NSB	Norway
8.715	In service	NSB Berging og Beredskap AS	Norway
8.716	In service	Scunthorpe Steelworks	UK
8.717	In service	Scunthorpe Steelworks	UK
8.718	Out of service, for parts	Scunthorpe Steelworks	UK
8.719	In service	Scunthorpe Steelworks	UK
8.720	Out of service	Scunthorpe Steelworks	UK

== Specifications ==
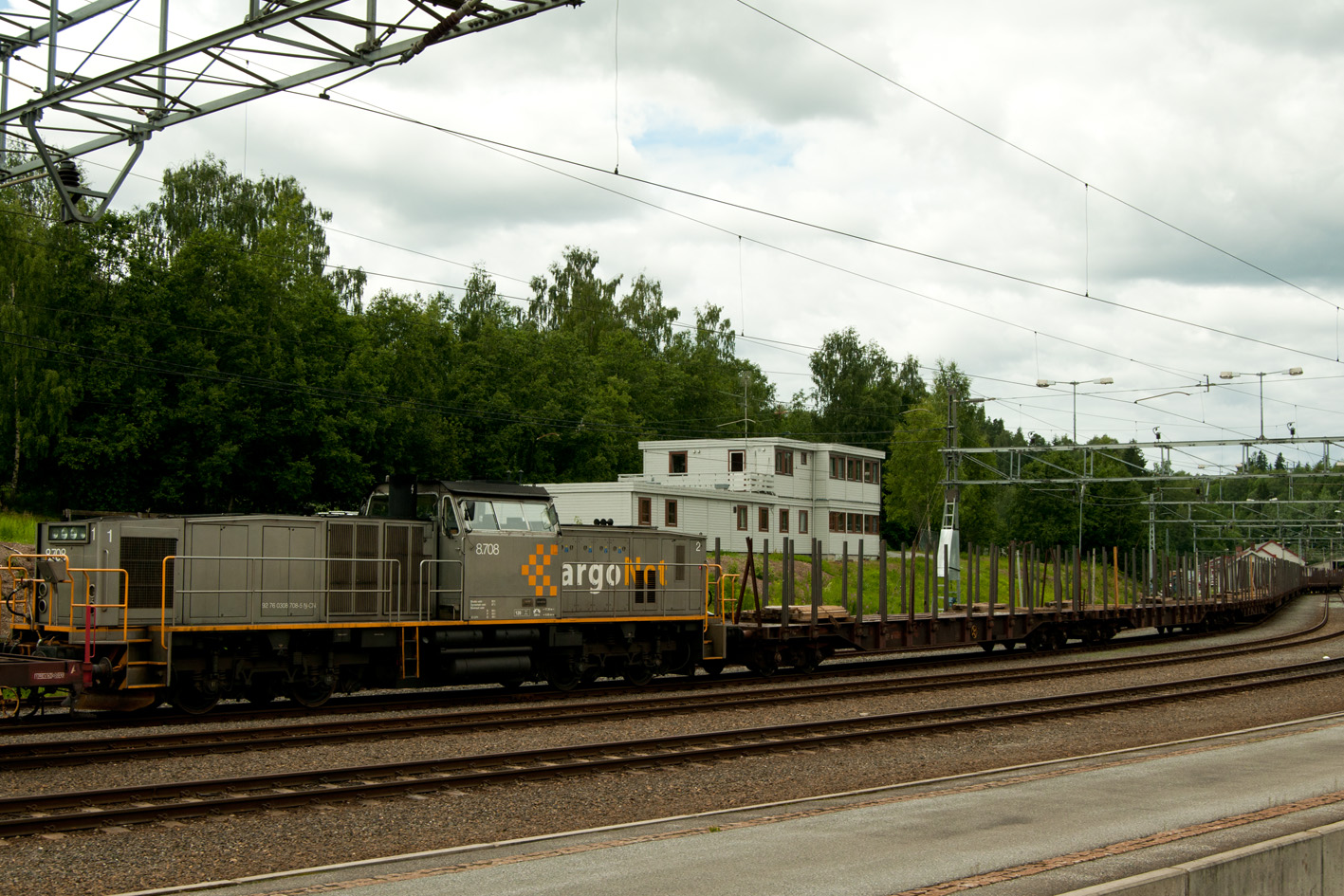
Di 8.708 hauling a timber train at Hønefoss Station

The Di 8 is a diesel-electric locomotive with a Bo'Bo' wheel arrangement. They have a weight of 82 tonnes (81 long tons; 90 short tons) and are built for standard gauge. The locomotives are 17.38 meters (57.0 ft) long, 3.00 meters (9.84 ft) wide and 4.39 meters (14.4 ft) tall. The wheelbase on the bogies is 2.40 meters (7 ft 10 in), while the wheelbase between the bogies is 9.05 meters (29.7 ft). The wheels have a diameter of 1.02 meters (3 ft 4 in) when new. Each locomotive is equipped with a Caterpillar 3516 DI-TA prime mover and a fuel capacity of 3,500 litres (770 imp gal; 920 US gal). This provides a power output of 1,570 kilowatts (2,110 hp) at 1,800 revolutions per minute, allowing for a maximum operating speed of 120 kilometers per hour (75 mph). They have a starting tractive effort of 270 kilenewtons.

The locomotives employ a Siemens Sibas 32 control system, along with an electrical transmission system from the same manufacturer. It takes advantage of water-cooled gate turn-off thyristor (GTO) semiconductor technology for pulse-width modulation inverters to supply power to the alternating current traction motors, located on a nose-suspended drive. The auxiliary electrical equipment was powered by an insulated-gate bipolar transistor (IGBT) inverter. NSB's Di 3, Di 4, Di 6 and Di 8 can all be run with together with up to three locomotives in multiple. The class is characterized by motormen as a comfortable locomotive with a good working environment. Due to their loading gauge, the Di 8s cannot be used on the British mainline railways, and are limited to being used on the internal steelworks railways.

In comparison to the NS 6400 and DE 1002, the Di 8s are 3.0 meters (9.8 ft) (NS) and 4.4 meters (14 ft) longer. The electrical transmission system saw ABB systems replaced by Siemens and the installation of GTO and IGBT systems. The power output was significantly improved, from between 1,120 and 1,380 kilowatts (1,500 and 1,850 hp). Caterpillar replace the other systems MTU and MWM motors. The increased power came at only a two-tonne weight penalty over the NS 6400.

== Bibliography ==
- Næss, Ståle (1999). Di 3: Billedboken om en loklegende (in Norwegian). BSN Forlag.
