= British Rail Class 21 (MaK) =

Class of diesel locomotives

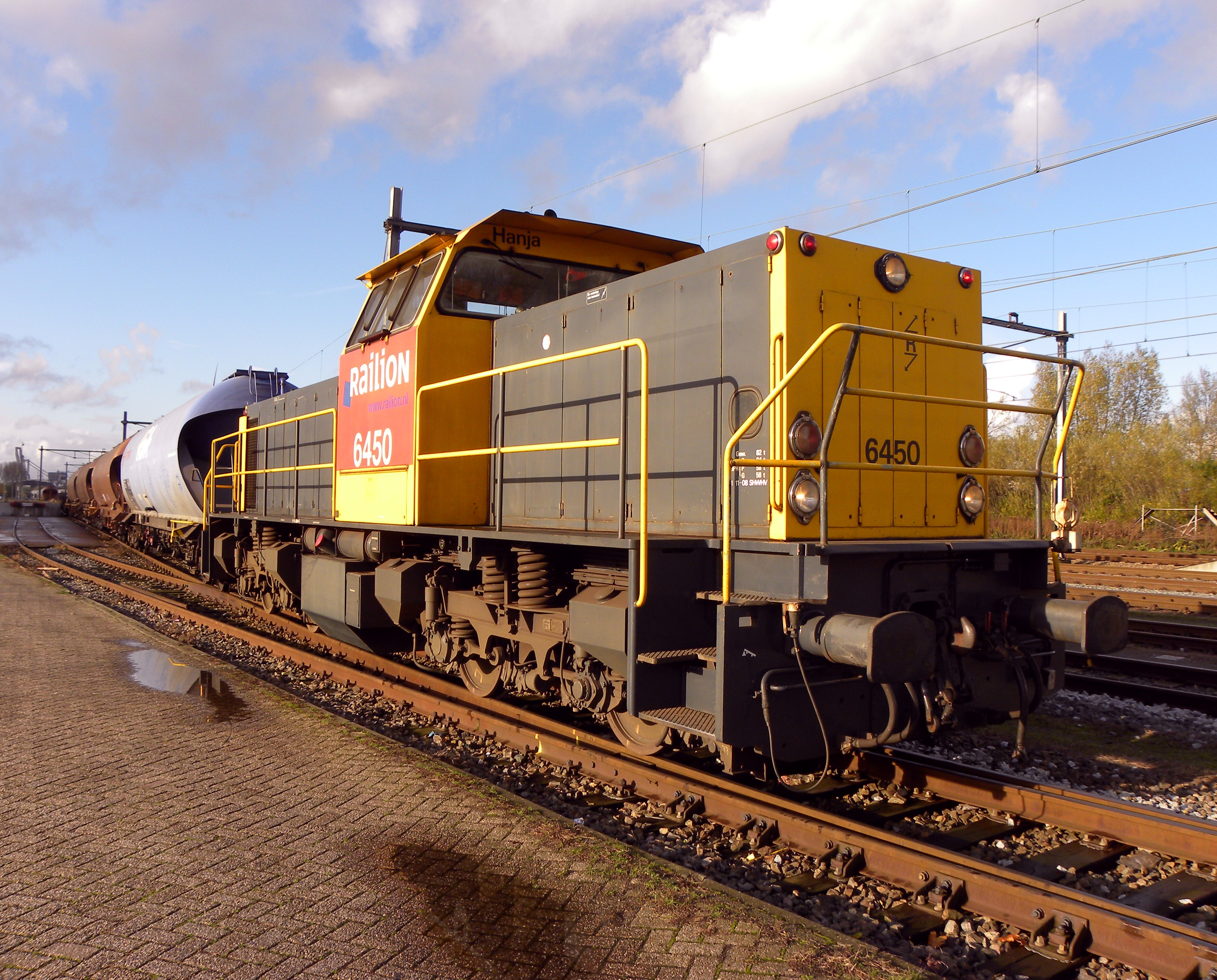
- NS 6450 in 2009 - this locomotive was subsequently procured by Eurotunnel
Type and origin
- Power type: Diesel-hydraulic; Diesel-electric
- Builder: MaK, Kiel, Germany
- Model: DE6400; DE1004; G1206; G1000
- Build date: 1990-92 (diesel-electric); 2005-06 (diesel-hydraulic)
- Total produced: 10 (diesel-electric); 6 (diesel-hydraulic)
Specifications
- Configuration
  - UIC: Bo'Bo'
- Gauge: 1,435 mm (4 ft 8 1/2 in) standard gauge
- Wheel diameter: 1,000 mm (39.37 in)
- Length: 14.7 m (48 ft 2 3/4 in) (21/5); 14.09 m (46 ft 2 3/4 in) (21/6); 14.4 m (47 ft 2 7/8 in) (21/9)
- Width: 3.3 m (10 ft 9 7/8 in)
- Height: 4.8 m (15 ft 9 in)
- Loco weight: 87 t (86 long tons) (21/5); 80 t (79 long tons) (21/6); 90 t (89 long tons) (21/9)
- Prime mover: Caterpillar 3512 B DITA-SC (21/5); MTU 8V 4000R41L (21/6); MTU 12V 396TC13 (21/9)
- Transmission: Hydraulic / L5r4szeU2 by Voith; Diesel electric / three phase electrical by ABB
- Train heating: None
- Loco brake: Air disc (21/5 and/6); Air (21/9)
Performance figures
- Maximum speed: 100 km/h (62 mph)
- Power output: 1,570 kW (2,110 hp) (21/5); 1,100 kW (1,500 hp) (21/6); 950 kW (1,270 hp) (21/9)
Career
- Operators: DB Cargo France; Getlink
- Numbers: 21544-21547; 21610-21611; 21901-21910

The second use of the TOPS classification Class 21 for locomotives used on the British railway network came through the use of a number of related diesel-hydraulic and diesel-electric locomotives procured following the opening of the Channel Tunnel. The total of 16 locomotives were obtained by two separate operators, with some used for freight, and others to propel service trains and as "Thunderbird" locomotives.

== History ==
In the early 1980s, Maschinenbau Kiel introduced its MaK DE 1002 design of diesel-electric locomotive, which was chosen by Nederlandse Spoorwegen as the basis of its Class 6400 freight locomotive. In 1991, Eurotunnel procured five similar locomotives as its Class 0001, for use both to operate service trains through the Channel Tunnel and as rescue locomotives.

In 2005, Euro Cargo Rail (ECR) was formed as a freight operator in France by English, Welsh and Scottish Railway (EWS). Its initial operations were carried out by a quartet of Vossloh G1206 diesel-hydraulic locomotives. Although these locomotives were intended for use in France, maintenance was planned to be carried out at EWS's depot at Dollands Moor, close to the Eurotunnel terminal at Cheriton. Because the locomotives would be operating on railways in Great Britain, they were allocated numbers in the TOPS system as Class 21. Two similar G1000 locomotives were procured in 2007.

In 2009, Eurotunnel's five locomotives were used extensively for rescue operations following severe snow. As a consequence, the company identified a need to have greater availability of these units, and so procured a pair of Class 6400 locomotives from DB Schenker Nederland in November 2010. At the same time, Eurotunnel registered its locomotives on TOPS - the superficial similarity to the ECR locomotives led to the Eurotunnel units also being assigned as Class 21. Eurotunnel acquired a further three secondhand units from the Netherlands in 2016.

== Fleet details ==
Class	Operator	No. Built	Year built	TOPS Number Range	Other numbers	Type	Notes
21/5	Euro Cargo Rail	4	2005-06	21544 - 21547	FB1544 - FB1547	G1206	21544 - 21545 off TOPS registration
21/6	Euro Cargo Rail	2	2005-06	21610 - 21611	FB1610 - FB1611	G1000	
21/9	Getlink	10	1990-92	21901 - 21905	0001 - 0005	DE1004	Original Eurotunnel locomotives
21/9	Getlink	10	1990-92	21906 - 21907	NS6456 - NS6457	DE6400	Purchased from DB in 2010
21/9	Getlink	10	1990-92	21906 - 21907	0006 - 0007	DE6400	Purchased from DB in 2010
21/9	Getlink	10	1990-92	21908 - 21910	NS6450 - NS6451; NS6447	DE6400	Purchased from DB in 2016
21/9	Getlink	10	1990-92	21908 - 21910	0008 - 0010	DE6400	Purchased from DB in 2016
