= 6400 class =

6400 class or Class 6400 may refer to:

- GWR 6400 Class, 0-6-0PT steam locomotives
- NS Class 6400, diesel-electric locomotives
