= CITE =

To cite is to quote or mention a source.

CITE or Cite may refer to:

- Cite (cycling team), Italy
- Cite (magazine), an American architecture quarterly
- CITE-FM, a Canadian radio station
- Center for Innovation Testing and Evaluation, a proposed facility in New Mexico, US
- Centre for IT Education, Bhubaneswar, India
- Certified Incentive Travel Executive, a meeting and convention planner

== See also ==
- Cité (disambiguation)
- CITES, a treaty
- Citation (disambiguation)
