= Cité =

Cité may refer to:

== Places ==
- Cité station, a Paris Metro station on the Île de la Cité
- Cité (Quebec), type of municipality in Quebec
- Citadel, the historical centre of an old city, originally fortified
- Housing estate, a group of homes and other buildings built together as a single development
- Île de la Cité, an island in the Seine where Paris was founded

== Arts, entertainment, and media ==
- Cite (magazine), American quarterly magazine

== See also ==
- CITE (disambiguation)
