= Scott Miller (country musician) =

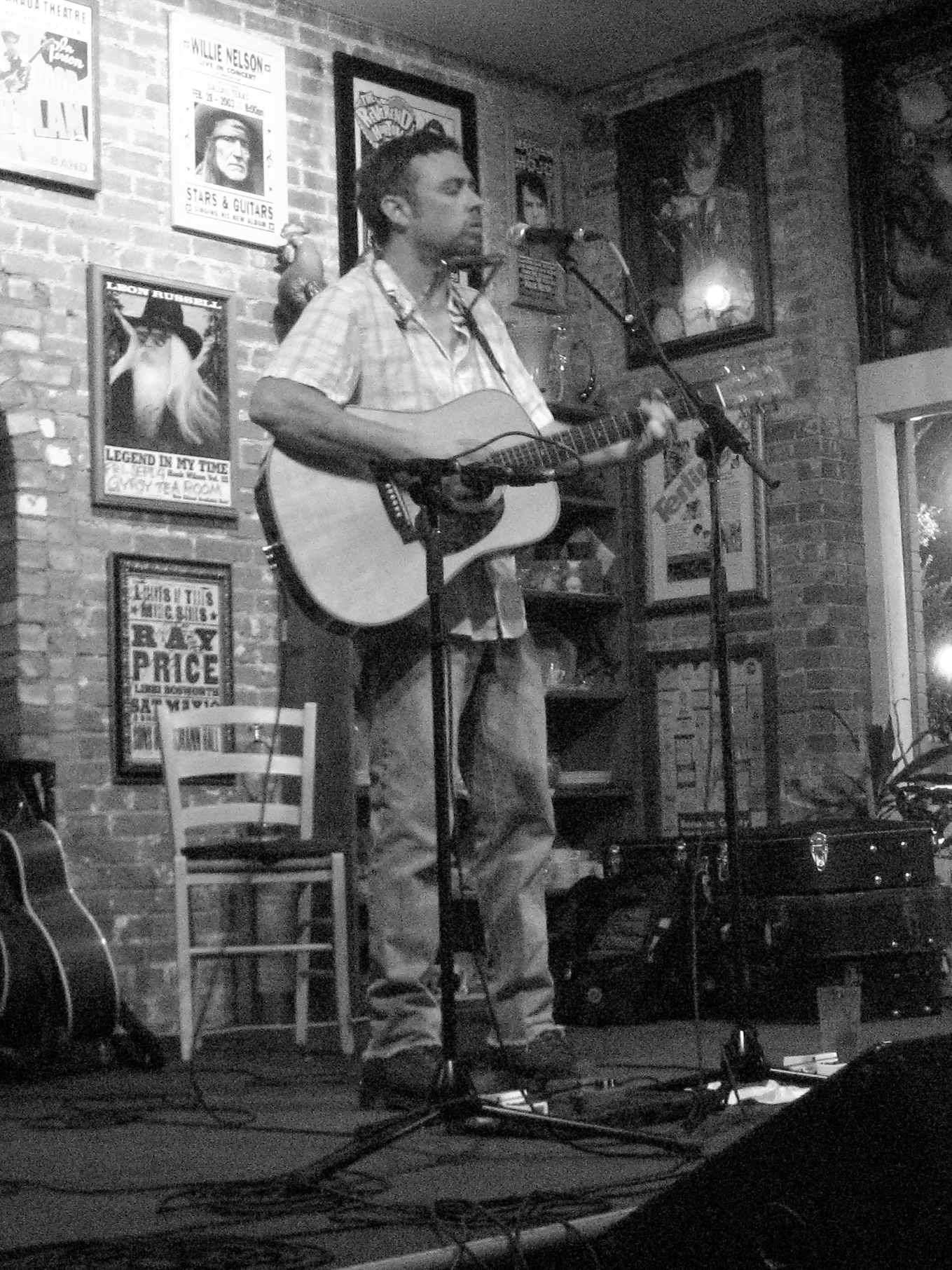
- Scott Miller performs in Dallas, Texas, on June 26, 2009

Background information
- Also known as: A. Scott Miller
- Born: Allen Scott Miller; 1968 (age 57–58); Swoope, Virginia, U.S.
- Genres: Alternative country, Southern rock
- Instruments: Vocals, guitar, harmonica
- Years active: 1996–present
- Labels: Sugar Hill; F.A.Y. Recordings

Allen Scott Miller (born 1968) is an American Southern rock and alternative country singer, songwriter, and guitarist.

== Biography ==
Miller grew up on a farm in Swoope, Virginia. After graduating from William & Mary with a degree in Russian literature, he moved to Knoxville, Tennessee in 1990. In 1994, he helped form a band called the Viceroys, which was renamed The V-Roys to avoid confusion with an existing group. The V-Roys were the first act signed on Steve Earle's label, E-Squared Records. After releasing two albums, the V-Roys split up in 1999.

Miller formed a new band, Scott Miller and the Commonwealth, who were briefly the house band on Blue Collar TV. The act was signed to Sugar Hill Records. He plays singer-songwriter, Americana music. The Lexington Herald-Leader wrote of Miller's first albums after the V-Roys as "strong, folk-infused songs" in which "the boozy charm of his music was innocuous."

Miller's songs reflect his degrees in American history and Russian studies, with references to his home, family, history, geography, writers and Appalachia. He started releasing music on his own lable, F.A.Y. Recordings, in 2007.

As of 2011, Miller was based in Staunton, Virginia, having moved back home to help manage the family cattle farm. Miller collaborated with filmmaker James Weems and photographer Glen Rose on mini-documentary Going Home which explores Miller's personal and musical journey in returning to the family farm.

In addition to solo shows, Miller played some shows with a full Commonwealth band lineup, but more often played trio shows with what he has come to call the Commonwealth Ladies Auxiliary (bass player Bryn Davies and fiddler Rayna Gellert).

In 2018, Miller was inducted into the East Tennessee Writers Hall of Fame for songwriting.

== Discography ==
Solo:

- Are You With Me? (2000) – live, independent self-release
- For Crying Out Loud (2008) – self-released on F.A.Y. Recordings
- Christmas Gift EP (2010) – self-released on F.A.Y. Recordings
- Big Big World (2013) – self-released on F.A.Y. Recordings
- Ladies Auxiliary (11/2017) – self-released on F.A.Y. Recordings

As Scott Miller & the Commonwealth:

- Thus Always to Tyrants (2001) – Sugar Hill
- Upside Downside (2003) – Sugar Hill
- Citation (2006) – Sugar Hill
- Reconstruction (2007) – live, independent self-release

With Rayna Gellert:

- CoDependents EP (2012) – self-released on F.A.Y. Recordings
