= Barendrecht train accident =

2009 fatal train collision near Barendrecht, Netherlands

Coordinates: 51°51′54″N 4°32′38″E

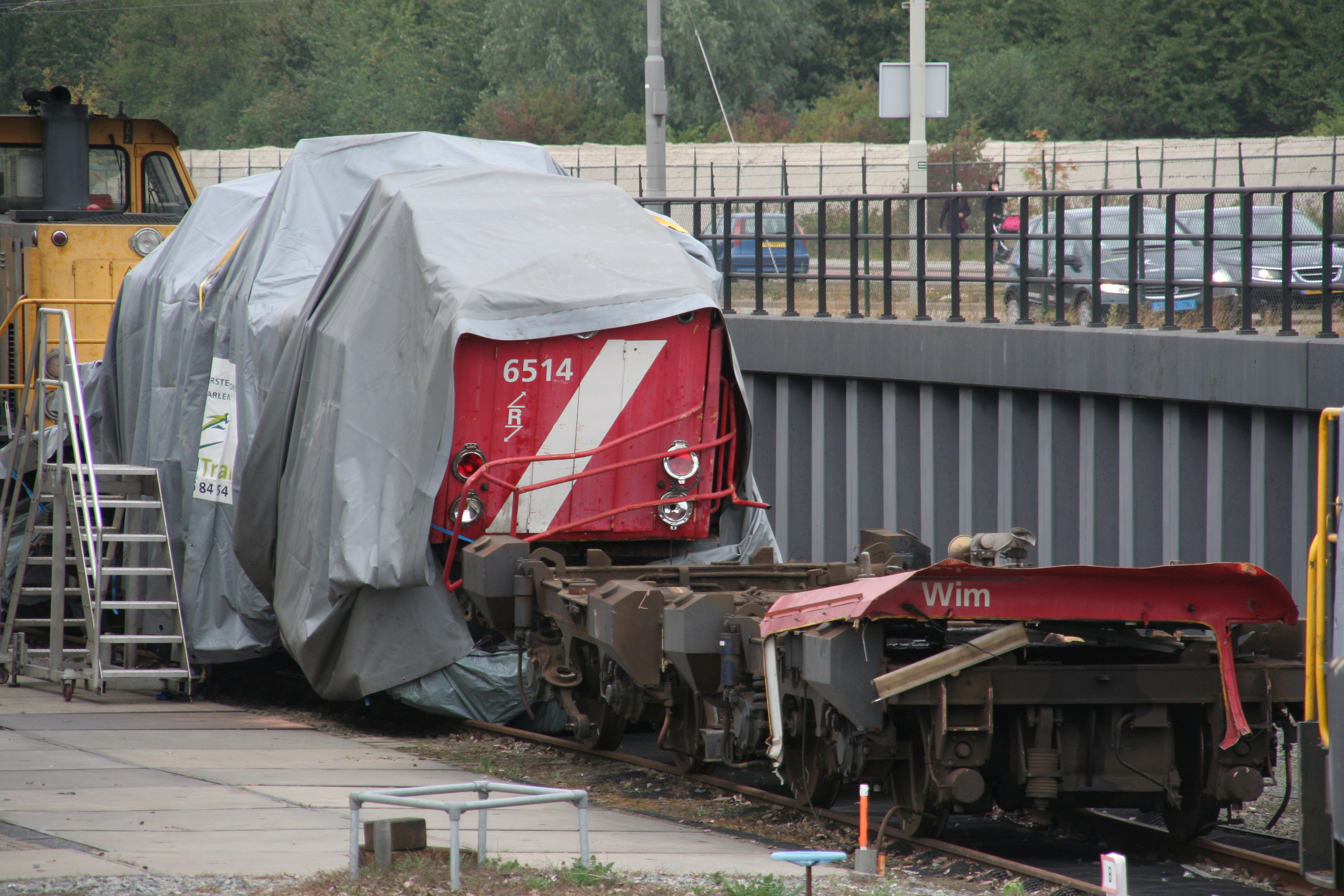
- Damaged train from the accident

Details
- Date: 24 September 2009
- Location: Barendrecht
- Country: Netherlands
- Line: Betuweroute and Breda–Rotterdam railway
- Operator: DB Schenker, ERS Railways, NS Hispeed and NS Reizigers
- Incident type: Collision

Statistics
- Trains: 4
- Passengers: 175
- Deaths: 1
- Injured: 3
Partial route map of
Breda–Rotterdam railway

The Barendrecht train accident involved the collision between two freight trains on 24 September 2009 near Barendrecht, Netherlands. One of the drivers was killed and the other was seriously injured.

== Description ==
On 24 September 2009 NS Class 6400 locomotives Nos. 6415 and 6514 were involved in a head-on collision with an EMD 66 locomotive of ERS (No. 6616) near Barendrecht close to the point the line passes under the A15 motorway. One of the drivers was killed, the other seriously injured. Further collision with a passenger train was avoided when the driver braked heavily, though some passengers were injured. In March 2010 both the locomotives 6415 and 6514 were scrapped. The cause of the collision was found to be partly due to a heart condition of one of the train drivers, and it was thought likely that the driver passed a red signal due to illness; additionally the automatic halting system on the track was of an outdated type.

== See also ==
- Lists of rail accidents
