= SNCF TGV Iris 320 =

French train

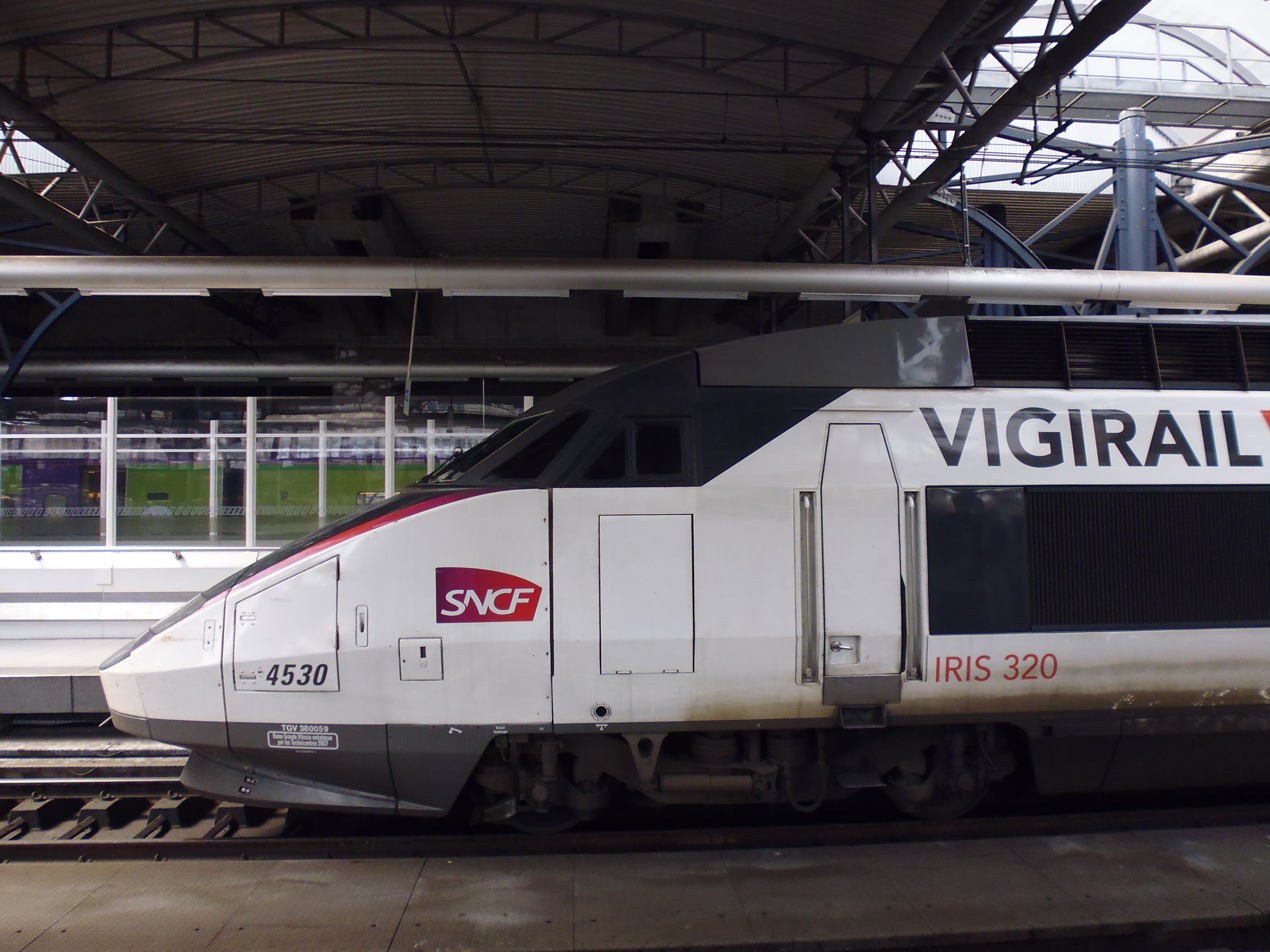
Iris 320 4530

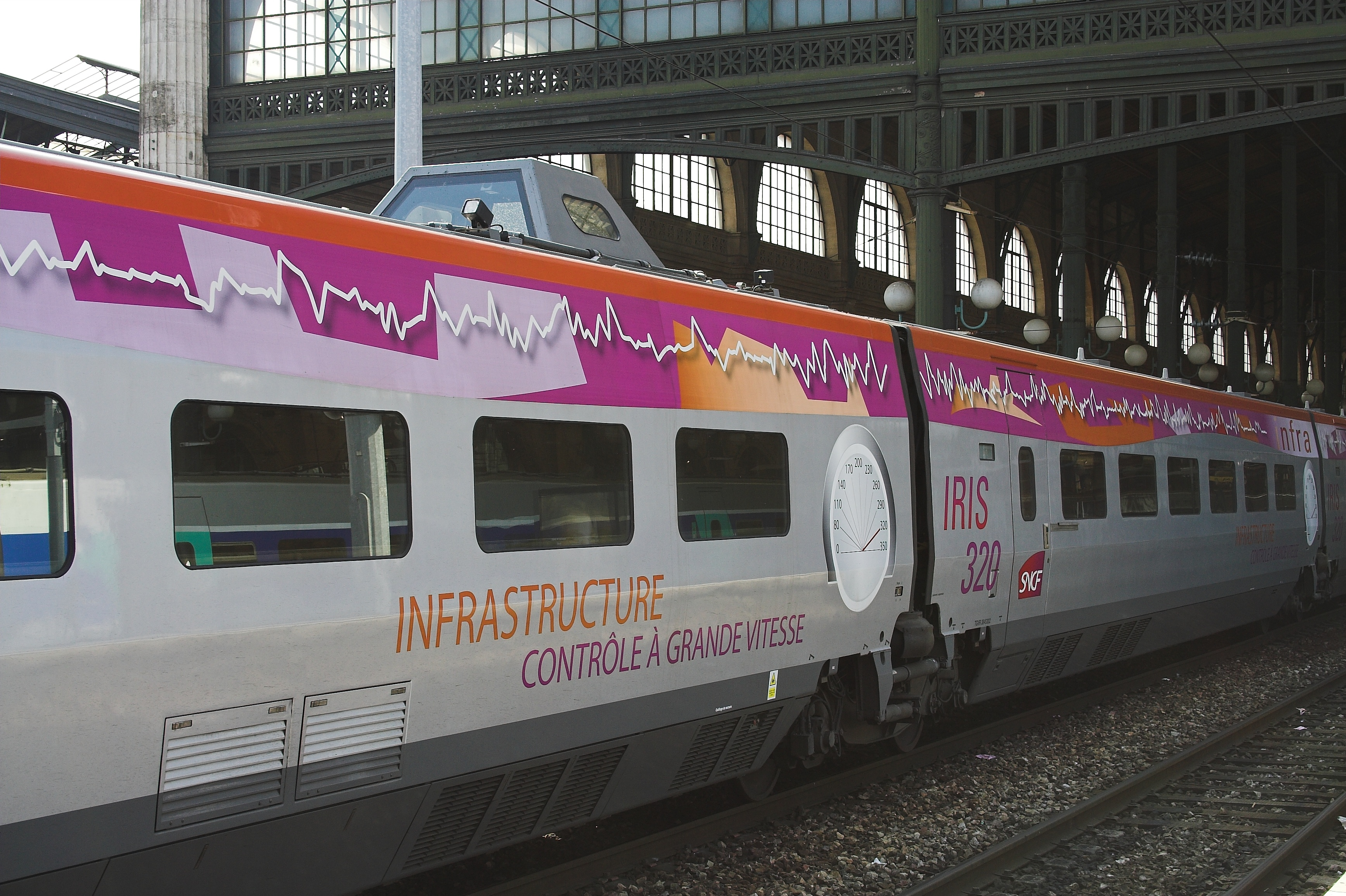
Iris 320 with pantograph monitoring dome on top.

Iris 320 is a modified TGV train operated by SNCF International as a dedicated track recording train for high-speed railways. The train can run at 320 kilometres per hour (199 mph) and consists of two power cars and eight trailer coaches, providing a 160-metre (524 ft 11 in) long laboratory. It was converted from former SNCF TGV Réseau passenger train number 4530.

The train is primarily used for monitoring the whole of the French high-speed LGV network every 15 days. In addition it surveys other main lines in France operating at above 160 km/h (99 mph) and the HSL 1 high-speed line in Belgium for Infrabel.

Once every two months, Iris 320 takes a survey of the Channel Tunnel for Eurotunnel (since December 2010) and of High Speed 1 for Network Rail (Channel Tunnel Rail Link) in the United Kingdom (since 4/5 May 2011). The cross-channel trips are diesel-hauled by Eurotunnel Class 0001 locomotives and travel at 100 km/h (62 mph).

== See also ==
- New Measurement Train, a British departmental train operated by Network Rail for track surveying, based on the British Rail Class 43 HST
- Doctor Yellow, the Japanese track surveying Shinkansen
- Comprehensive Inspection Trains, Chinese high speed departmental trains operated on track surveying duties
