= Compagnia Italiana Turismo =

Italian travel agency

The Compagnia Italiana Turismo (CIT) was an Italian travel agency and tourism promotion quango, privatized in 1996.

It was established by royal charter in 1927 as the Fascist tourist promotion agency, in contrast to the Liberal ENIT and the bourgeois Touring Club Italiano. Its first president was Ezio Maria Gray, an enthusiastic Fascist and corporatist.

Its goal was to promote Italy as an international tourist destination and to support Italian foreign tourism. To do this, it created a network of travel agencies in Italy and worldwide. Its founding members were the Ferrovie dello Stato, the Banco di Sicilia, the Banco di Napoli, and ENIT (the Italian national tourist board).

After its 1996 privatization, CIT was never able to establish itself financially, and was liquidated in bankruptcy court in Milan in 2008.
