= New Measurement Train =

Specialised train which operates in the United Kingdom

Network Rail Class 43
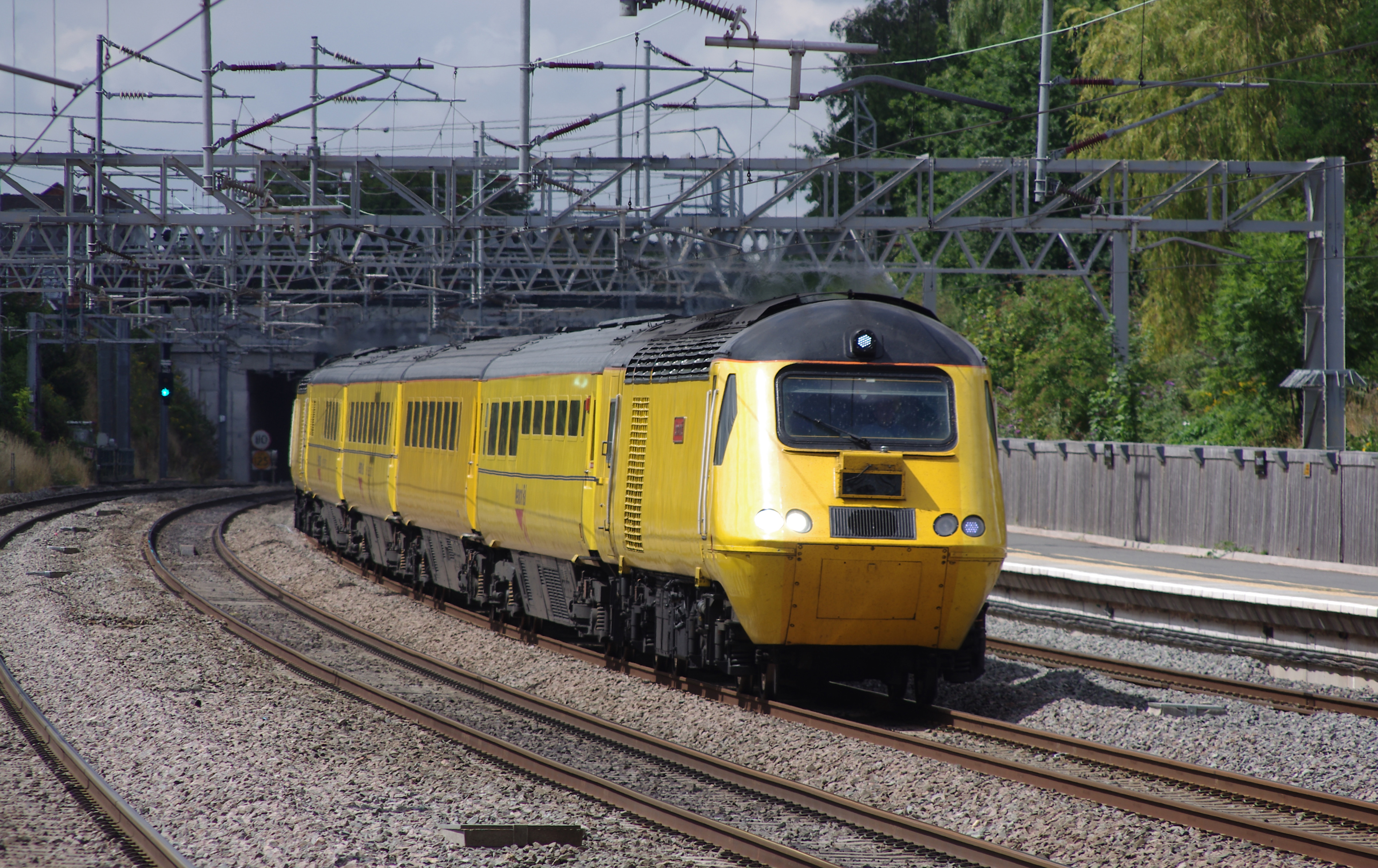
- 43062 leading the New Measurement Train at Tamworth in August 2011
- In service: 2003 – present
- Manufacturer: British Rail Engineering Limited
- Family name: InterCity 125
- Number built: 1
- Formation: 2 Class 43 power cars 5 Mark 3
- Operators: Network Rail

Specifications
- Maximum speed: 125 mph (201 km/h)
- Track gauge: 1,435 mm (4 ft 8 1/2 in) standard gauge

The New Measurement Train (NMT), nicknamed the Flying Banana, is a specialised train which operates in the United Kingdom to assess the condition of track so that engineers can determine where to work. It is a specially converted InterCity 125, consisting of two Class 43 power cars and five or six Mark 3 carriages. It can check the condition of most main lines and some secondary routes operating on a four weekly cycle. This cycle replaced its original 13-week cycle after the introduction of the Plain Line Pattern Recognition (PLPR) Design Patrolling Program.

== History ==
The NMT was formed in direct response to concern over gauge corner cracking following the October 2000 Hatfield rail crash. In September 2002 work commenced on preparing ex Virgin CrossCountry Class 43 power cars 43013, 43014 and 43062 and two Mark 2 and three Mark 3 carriages from the Railway Technical Centre fleet. Only two carriages carried testing equipment, the extra carriages being required for brake force purposes.

The NMT entered service on 9 May 2003. The two Mark 2s were replaced in 2004 with ex Virgin CrossCountry Mark 3s. In August 2005 a further Mark 3 joined the fleet fitted with a pantograph.

In 2004/05, power cars 43067, 43154 and 43196 were added while the core fleet was upgraded. Two had been placed in store by February 2006, 43196 was placed in store September 2006.

In 2009/10, 43013, 43014 and 43062 had their Paxman Valenta engines replaced with MTU engines by Brush Traction. Ex London North Eastern Railway powercars 43290 and 43299 were hired in 2021 while the regular powercars were overhauled.

== Operation ==
In the Production Vehicle (PV), lasers, vertical and horizontal actuators, gyros and accelerometers measure the interaction of the vehicle passing over the track. Outputs from the measuring system include track gauge, alignment, twist and cant. Other systems on the roof of the Development Vehicle (DV) measure features such as overhead line height and stagger. On the West Coast Main Line, particular care has to be taken to ensure that clearances are maintained for the use of tilting trains. The train captures video footage from the front and rear power cars.

The DV's equipment includes a video-based system utilising image recognition to look for defects such as missing clips. The DV also houses a non-contact overhead line monitoring system, which utilises lasers to measure the position of the wires in relation to the rails the train is on. High-powered white lights and cameras also enable the wear of the contact wire to be monitored. The wear is measured as the width of a strip on the underside, where the pantographs come into contact and wear away the cable. If the original thickness of the cable is known, this can be converted into a percentage of remaining area, which in turn when related to a maximum allowable wear can give an estimate of the remaining life. On hazy nights, the measuring equipment produces a blue glow that is visible some distance away.

The track recording systems vehicle has banks of screens allowing the team of three operators to view a range of system outputs including track faults, train location and radio signal strength. One of the mess cars hosts a system for monitoring and commissioning of Network Rail's GSM-R network.

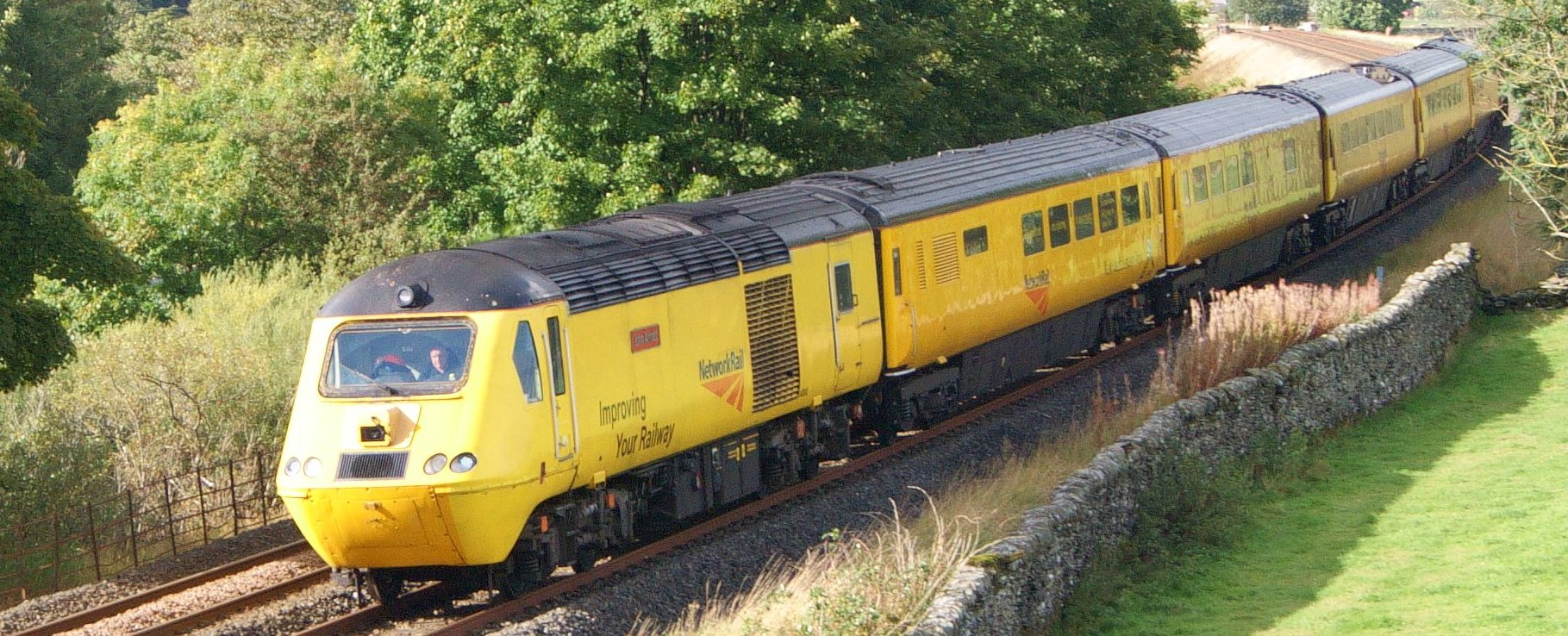
Class 43 HST New Measurement Train in operation on the Settle-Carlisle line

From January 2020, the NMT was allocated to Loram UK at the Railway Technical Centre (RTC), Derby where all vehicle maintenance and overhauls were carried out. Maintenance of the recording equipment is also carried out at the RTC by Network Rail engineers.

Effective December 2025 a new contract was awarded to Colas Rail; since then, all maintenance has been carried out by the Colas NMT technicians at UKRL's site in Leicester.

== Models ==
Hornby has released runs of 43013/14, in both the original and "improving your railway" liveries. Hornby has also released complementary MK3 trailers.

== See also ==
- Doctor Yellow – high speed measurement trains in Japan
- SNCF TGV Iris 320 – high speed measurement train in France
- China Railway comprehensive inspection trains – high speed measurement trains in China
