= Eurotunnel Class 0001 =

Class of diesel-electric locomotives

Type and origin
- Power type: Diesel-electric
- Builder: MaK / ABB
- Serial number: 1000867–1000871
- Model: DE 1004
- Build date: 1992
- Total produced: 5 (+5 ex-NS 6400)
Specifications
- Configuration
  - UIC: Bo′Bo′
  - Commonwealth: Bo-Bo
- Gauge: 1,435 mm (4 ft 8 1/2 in) standard gauge
- Wheel diameter: 1,000 mm (39.37 in)
- Length: 14.4 m (47 ft 3 in)
- Loco weight: 90 tonnes (200,000 lb)
- Prime mover: MTU 12V 396 TC13
- Cylinders: 12
Performance figures
- Maximum speed: 100 km/h (62 mph)
- Power output: 960 kW (1,290 hp)
Career
- Operators: Getlink
- Numbers: 0001–0005; 0006–0010 (ex-NS 6400)
- Sources: except where noted Details refer to original 5 locomotives acquired, for more information on the five units added in 2010 & 2016 see NS Class 6400

The Eurotunnel Class 0001 Bo-Bo diesel-electric locomotives were built by Maschinenbau Kiel (manufacturers designation DE 1004) between 1991 and 1992. They are derived from the MaK DE 1002 and NS Class 6400 (MaK DE 1003). When operating in the United Kingdom, the locomotives are assigned a TOPS classification as Class 21.

== History and design ==
Five locomotives were built, numbered 0001–0005. They carry a yellow and grey livery and are used by Getlink for rescuing trains in the Channel Tunnel, and for propelling service trains in the channel tunnel. They are cleared to travel to Calais, Ashford, or St. Pancras; since 2007 they have been authorised to rescue trains on High Speed 1 in the event of a power failure. They have also been used to haul the SNCF TGV Iris 320 test train through the Channel Tunnel.

In 2007 the locomotives were fitted with diesel particulate filters for the exhaust gases, which replaced the exhaust scrubber wagons that were previously coupled to the engines.

Following a series of tunnel breakdowns due to snow during winter 2009/10, during which the locomotives were extensively used, in November 2010 Eurotunnel announced it was to acquire two more Krupp rescue locomotives (Note: The MaK plant where the locomotives were built was part of the Krupp group in the 1990s) with co-financing from Eurostar, at a cost of €1.3 million. (Note: See 16–21 December European snowfall) The locomotives acquired were similar NS 6400 locomotives bought second hand from DB Schenker Nederland, which were renumbered as 0006-0007. Eurotunnel acquired a further three in September 2016. One of these three will be retained as a shunter to work at the goods yard at Calais-Fréthun, and has received the silver and blue Europorte livery, while the other two have the grey and yellow Eurotunnel livery identical to the remainder of the fleet.

Class		Operator	No. Built (Year)	Number Range	Notes
0001		Eurotunnel	1991–1992	0001–0005	
0001		Eurotunnel	1991–1992	0006–0010	Purchased from DB Schenker Nederland
List of locomotives
Current Number		Previous Number	Current Livery	Status	Notes
Eurotunnel	TOPS	Previous Number	Current Livery	Status	Notes
0001	21901		Eurotunnel Yellow/Grey	Operational	
0002	21902		Eurotunnel Yellow/Grey	Operational	
0003	21903		Eurotunnel Yellow/Grey	Operational	
0004	21904		Eurotunnel Yellow/Grey	Operational	
0005	21905		Eurotunnel Yellow/Grey	Operational	
0006	21906	NS6456	Eurotunnel Yellow/Grey	Operational	
0007	21907	NS6457	Eurotunnel Yellow/Grey	Operational	
0008	21908	NS6450	Eurotunnel Yellow/Grey	Operational	
0009	21909	NS6451	Eurotunnel Yellow/Grey	Operational	
0010	21910	NS6447	Europorte Silver/Blue	Operational	Shunter at Calais-Frethun
