= ENIT =

Italian governmental agency

Logo of ENIT

ENIT—Agenzia nazionale del turismo, known in English as The Italian Government Tourist Board, formerly the Ente Nazionale Italiano per il Turismo ('Italian National Agency for Tourism') is the Italian national tourism board. The national Tourist Board is situated in Rome.

== History ==
It was founded in 1919 under the Liberal-Radical government of Francesco Saverio Nitti. Following the transformation ordered by the 2005 regulation, the ENIT-Italian National Tourism Agency took over, with increased and more articulated institutional responsibilities, an almost one-hundred-year activity of the Italian National Tourist Board. In 2014 ENIT was transformed into a public economic body.

ENIT is responsible for the promoting tourism in Italy.
