= China Railway comprehensive inspection trains =

Chinese high-speed electric testing trainset

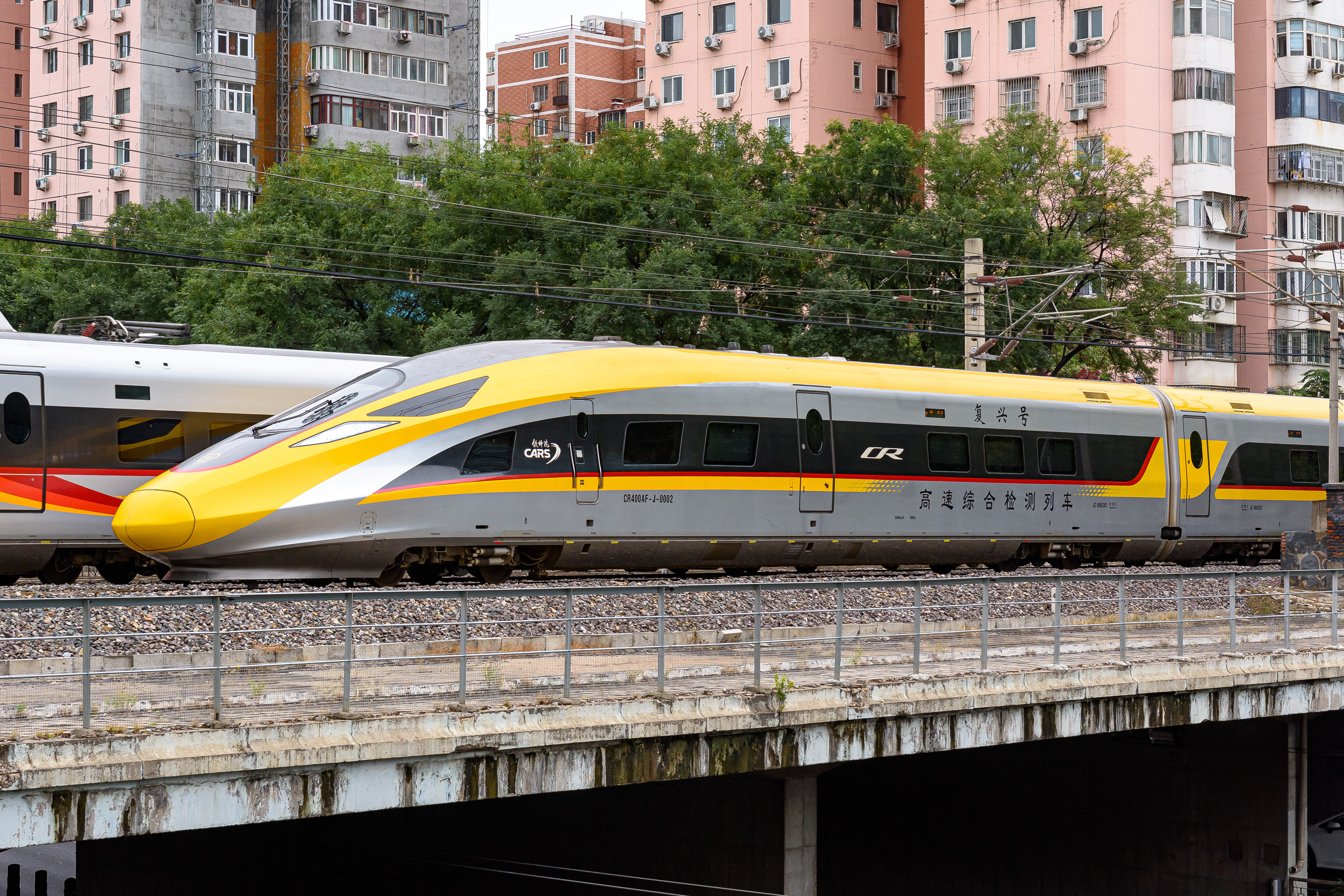
CR400AF-J-0002, inspection train derived from CR400AF

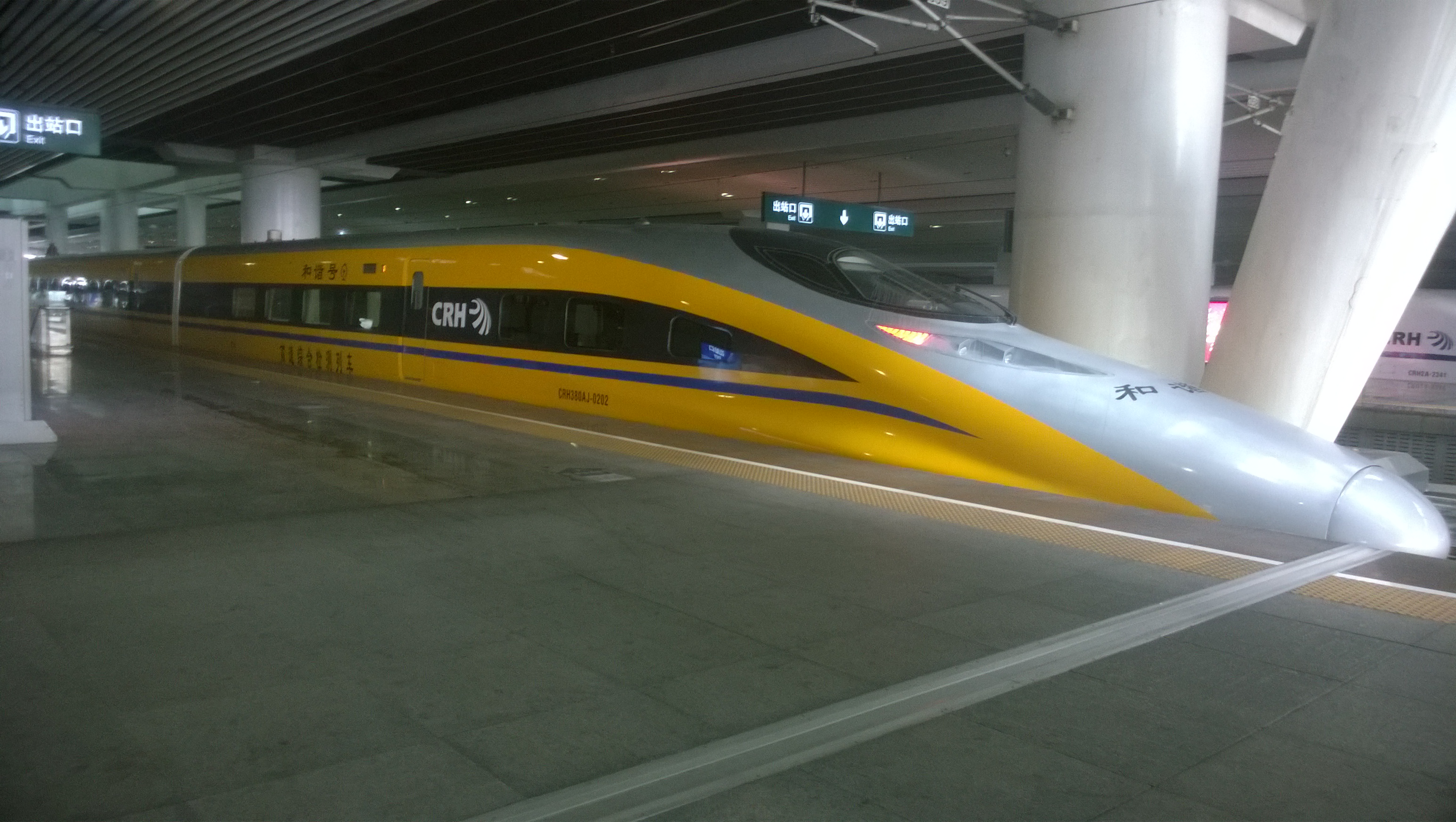
CIT400A (or CRH380AJ-0202)

China Railway comprehensive inspection trains, or CITs, are high-speed test trains used on the high-speed rail network of China and the Jakarta-Bandung High Speed Rail in Indonesia. They are normally owned and operated by China Railway or the China Academy of Railway Sciences (CARS) and Kereta Cepat Indonesia China.

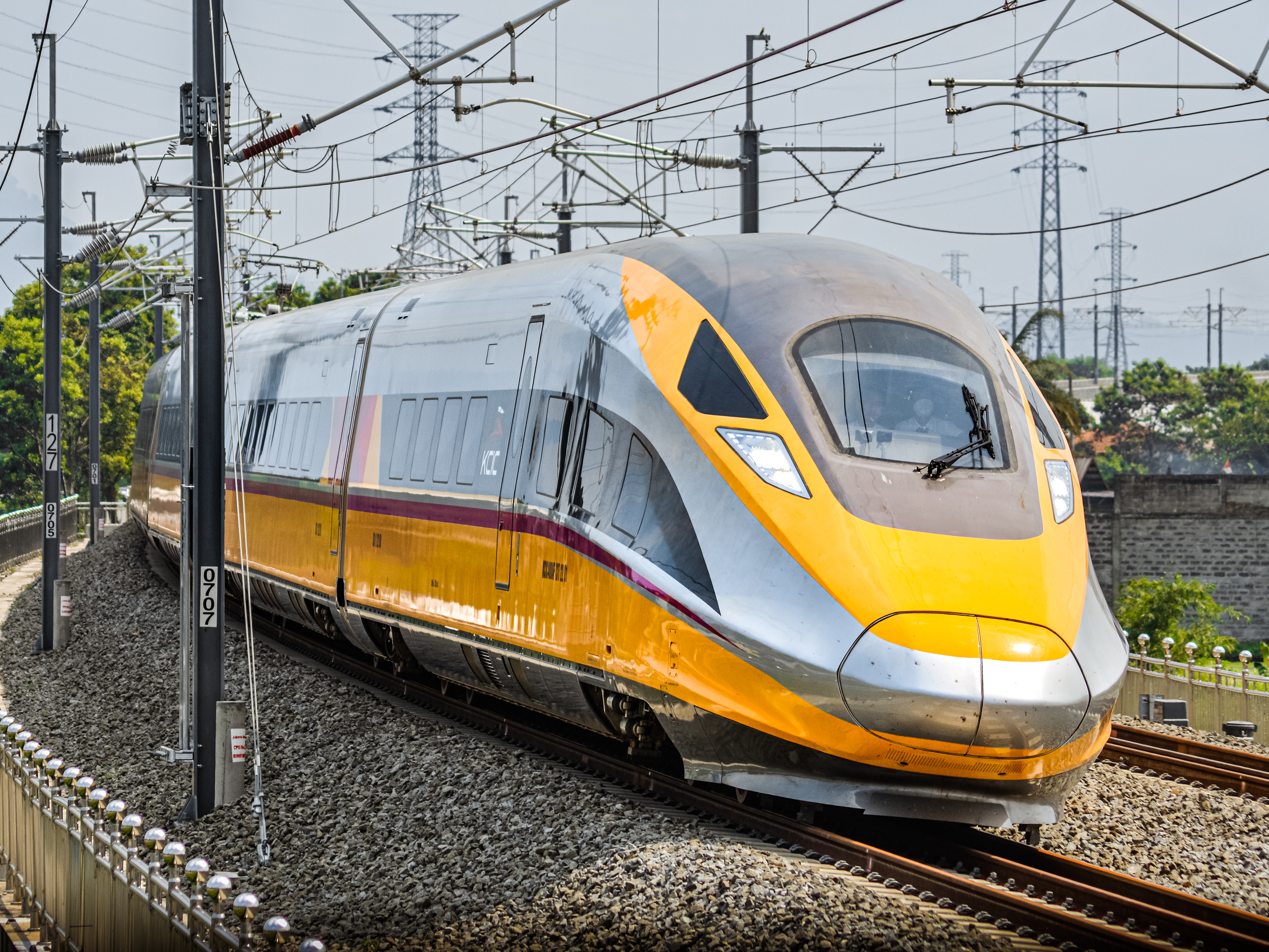
KCIC400AF CIT in use in Jakarta Bandung HSR (Whoosh)

CIT trains are equipped with special devices to monitor the conditions of the track, the wheel-rail force, a catenary-pantograph communications system, and a signal system. Stock is usually painted with yellow bands and the words "高速综合检测列车" (meaning "High-speed Comprehensive Inspection Train") are usually painted on the side. The designs of most CITs are based on originally commercial designs, like the CIT001 (based on CRH5) and CIT400A (based on CRH380A). However, the CIT380A trainset was converted from a prototype of CRH380A (CRH2-150C). Some re-vamped commercial trains used for testing purposes are not designated as CITs and have standard serial numbers appended with a "J" (e.g. CRH380AJ). This stands for "Jiǎn" (inspection).

== List of CIT trains ==
=== CRH5J-0501 ===
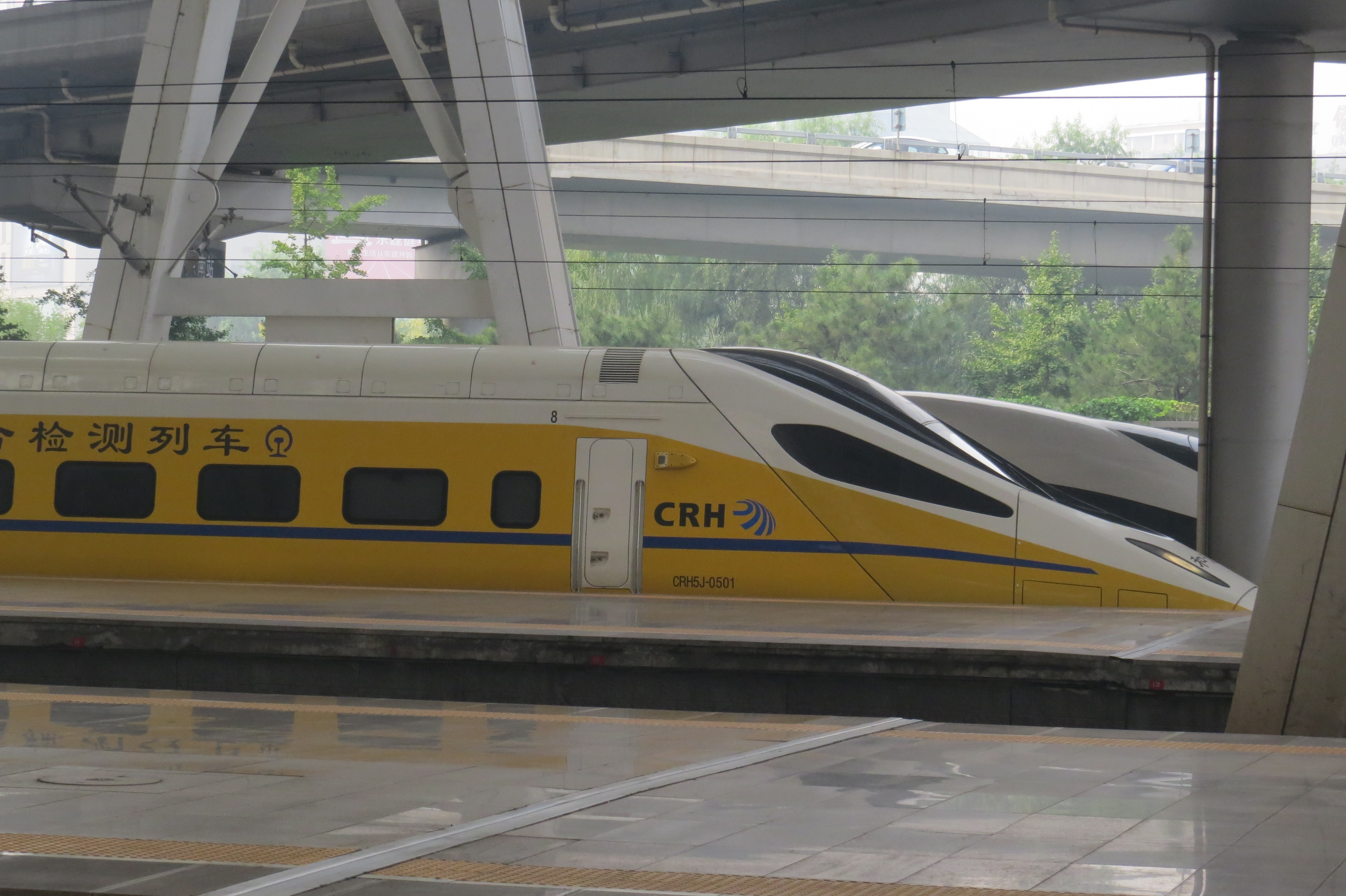
CRH5J-0501 (CIT001) at Beijing South railway station

CRH5J-0501 (original designation, CIT001) is an 8-car trainset based on the CRH5 design, which serves as a 250 km/h (155 mph) test train.

The CIT001 was ordered by the China Academy of Railway Science on 2 April 2007 and was co-designed by CARS and CNR. The official name is Code Zero Comprehensive Inspection Train. The train is painted with yellow and white striped livery and started test runs on 1 July 2007. It came into service on 6 June 2008.

Formation

Car Number	Function
CIT001-01	Communication signal inspection car
CIT001-02	Conference car
CIT001-03	Catenary inspection car
CIT001-04	Data processing car
CIT001-05	Track inspection car
CIT001-06	Dining/rest car
CIT001-07	Sleeping car
CIT001-00	Signal inspection car

=== CRH2A-2010 ===
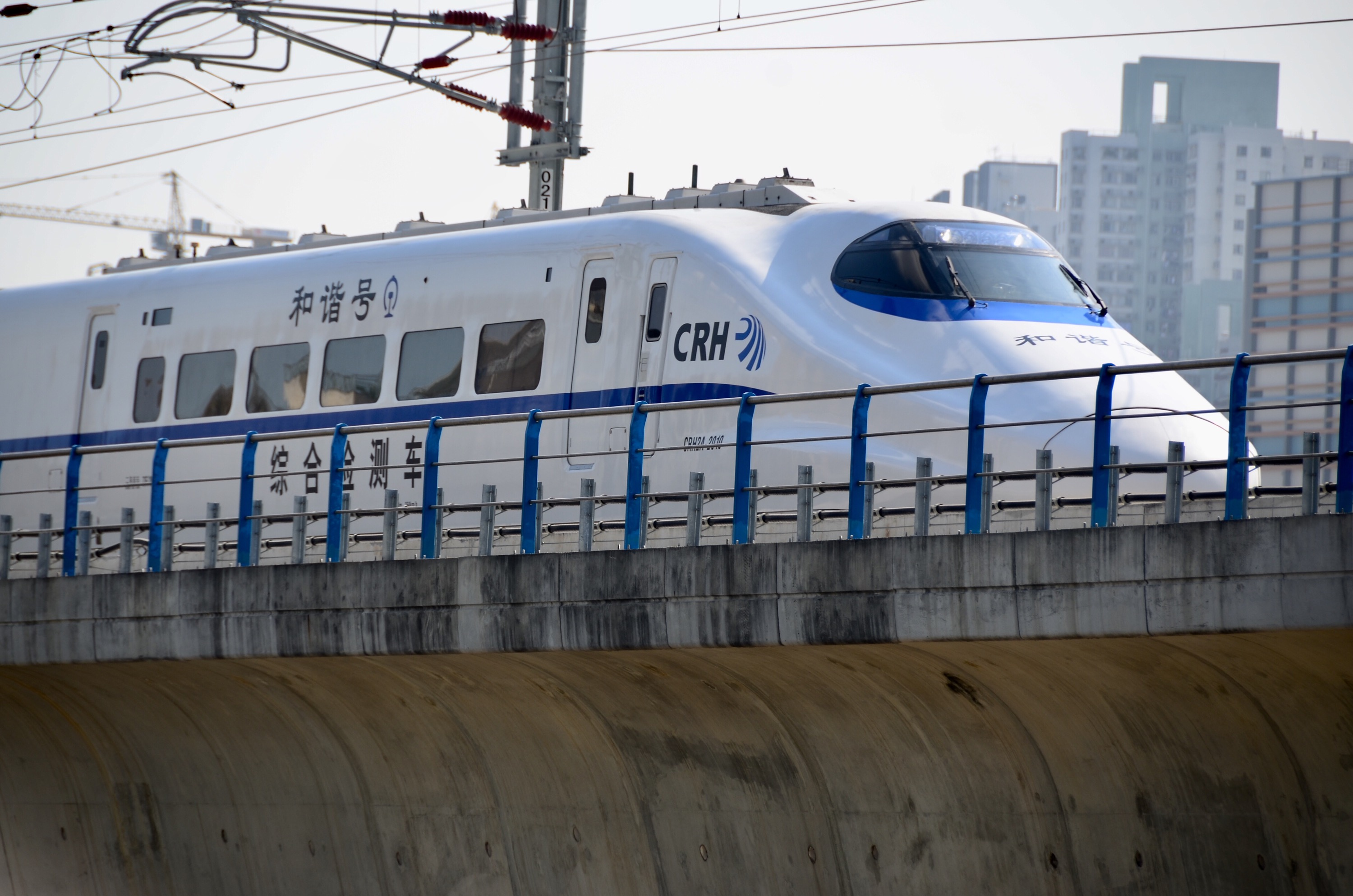
CRH2A-2010 at Zhuhai–Zhuhai Airport intercity railway

CRH2A-2010 (formerly CRH2-010A) is the first high-speed test train in China and the first CRH2 trainset manufactured by CSR Sifang. The trainset rolled off the production line on 31 July 2006. In March 2007 it was converted to be a 250 km/h (155 mph) test train. The train is equipped with ATP, signal parameter monitoring, wireless field monitoring, pantograph and catenary monitoring, track geometry monitoring, dynamics and acceleration detecting devices and a circuit-monitoring system.

=== CRH2C-2061 ===
CRH2C-2061 (formerly CRH2-061C) is the first 300 km/h (186 mph) high speed trainset manufactured by CSR Sifang. The trainset rolled off the production line on 22 December 2007 and was named CRH2-300, as the prototype of CRH2C. During a test on 22 April 2008, CRH_{2}-061C reached a top speed of over 370 km/h (230 mph) on Beijing-Tianjin high-speed rail and on 11 December 2009 reached an improved top speed of 394.2 km/h (245 mph) on the Zhengzhou-Xi'an high-speed railway line. It now serves as a 350 km/h inspection train, equipped with track inspection, catenary examination, and signal inspection devices.

=== CRH2C-2068 ===
CRH2C-2068 (formerly CRH2-068C) is a 350 km/h (217 mph) inspection train, equipped with track inspection, dynamics performance monitor and pantograph/catenary inspection devices.

=== CRH2C-2150 ===
CRH2C-2150 (formerly CIT380A) is a 350 km/h (217 mph) high-speed comprehensive inspection train. It is converted from the prototype vehicle CRH380A. The original train, CRH2-150C, was rolled off the production line in April 2010. The eight-car train was modified to a CIT train after a series of tests for the design of CRH380A, and was delivered in November 2010.

Formation

Car Number	Function
A00001	Signal inspection car
A00002	Communication test and comprehensive system test car
A00003	Office/rest car
A00004	Office/rest car
A00005	Dining/rest car
A00006	Catenary-pantograph system inspection car
A00007	Dynamics system inspection car
A00000	Signal system/track inspection car

=== CRH380AJ-0201/0202/0203/2808/2818 ===
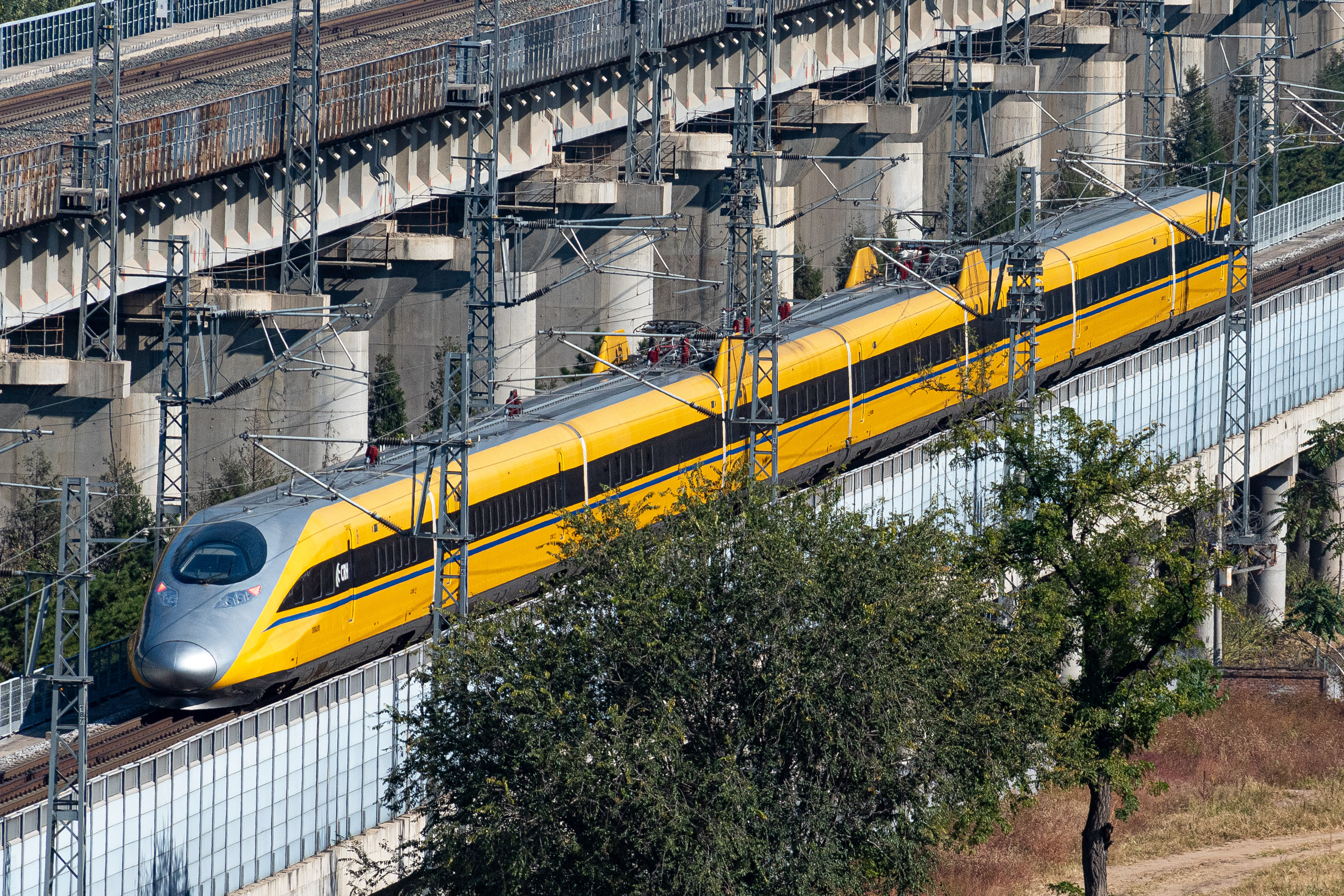
CRH380AJ-2818 in Qingta Subdistrict, Beijing

The CRH400A-001 (initially CIT400A) is the first ever 380 km/h (236 mph) CIT train of China, based on the CRH380A design. The 8-car trainset was manufactured by CSR Sifang factory and rolled off the production line on February 22, 2011. The train has a formation of 7M1T, and was designed with a top testing speed of 500 km/h (311 mph).

Development on the CIT400A started in June 2010. On February 23, 2011, the CRH400A-001 arrived at CARS; after a series of modifications to rectify problems that occurred during testing, the trainset was set to enter service on March 3, performing inspection work on the Jinghu HSR.

=== CRH380BJ-0301 ===
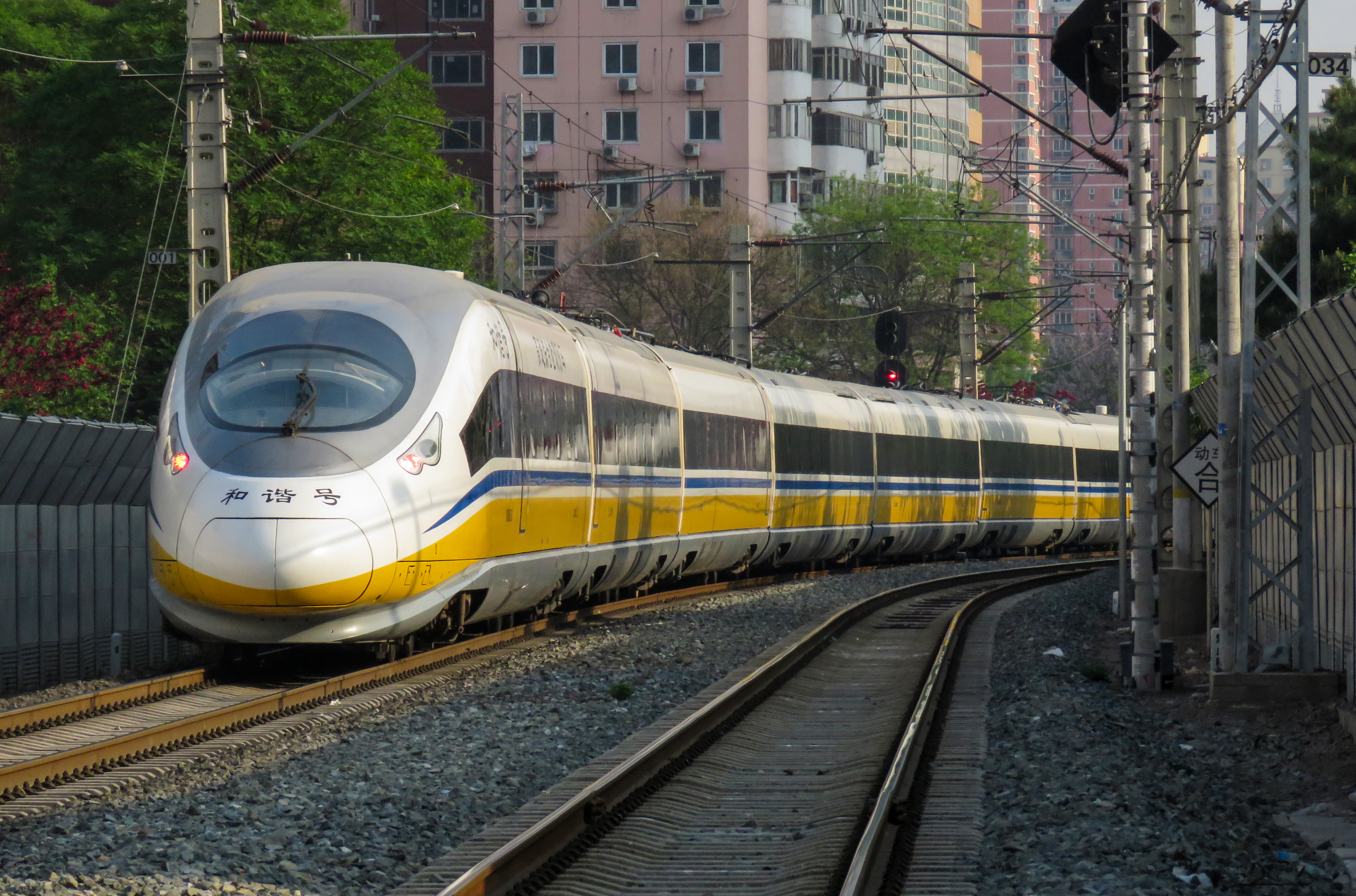
CRH380BJ-0301 on Beijing–Kowloon railway

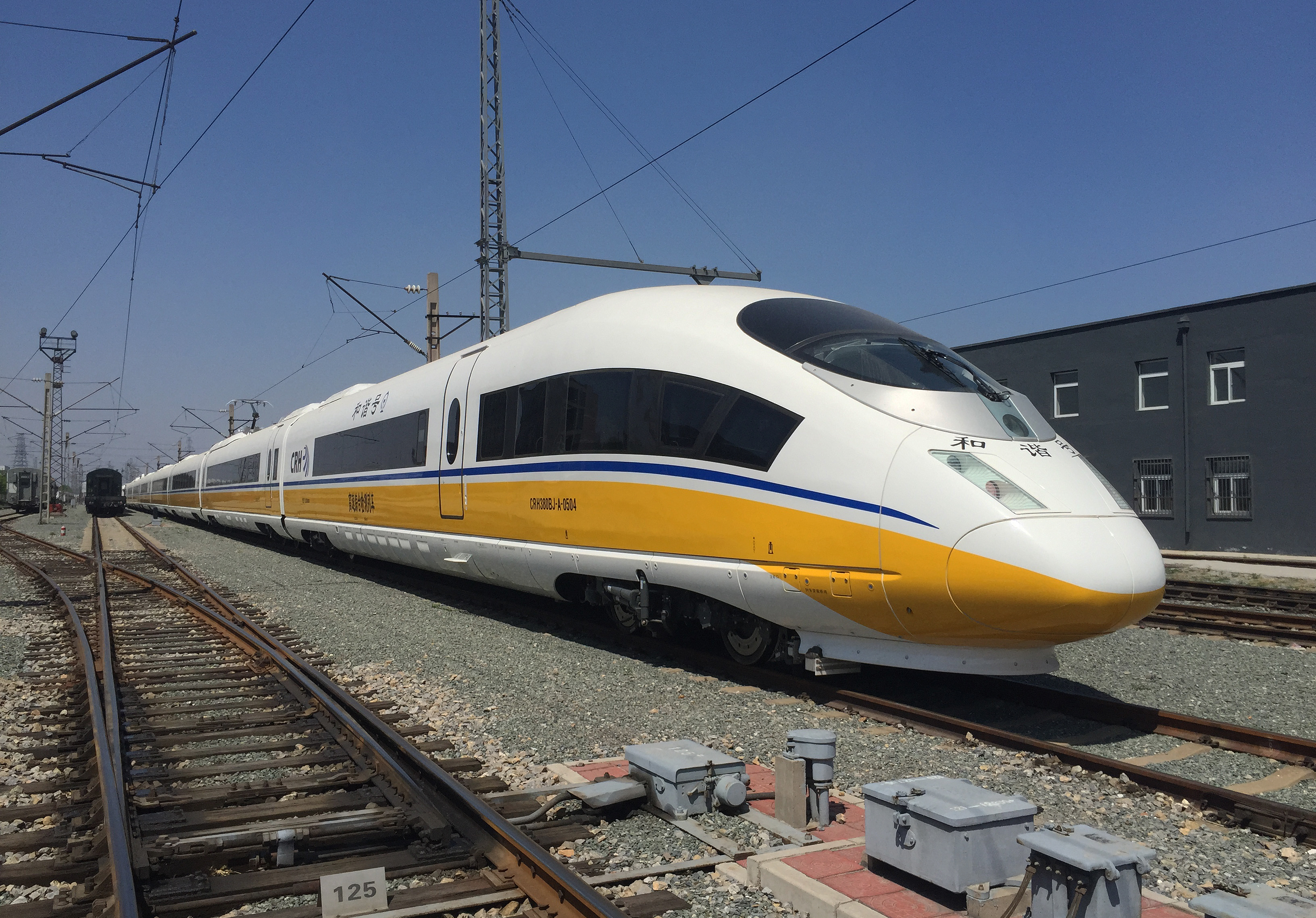
CRH380BJ-A-0504, another inspection train built for low temperature conditions in Northeast China, at the China Academy of Railway Sciences.

The CRH380BJ-0301 (initially CIT400B) is a 380 km/h (236 mph) CIT train, co-manufactured by the CNR Tangshan and CNR Changchun factories. The design is based on CNR's CRH380CL trainset, with a formation of 6M2T, a designed top speed of 500 km/h (311 mph), and a top operating speed of 400 km/h (249 mph).

Formation

Car Number	Function
ZJ10001	Communication signal inspection car
ZJ10002	Catenary and comprehensive system inspection car
ZJ10003	Track dynamics inspection car
ZJ10004	Equipment car
ZJ10005	Equipment car
ZJ10006	Dining/rest car
ZJ10007	Sleeping car
ZJ10008	Signal inspection car

=== CRH380AM ===
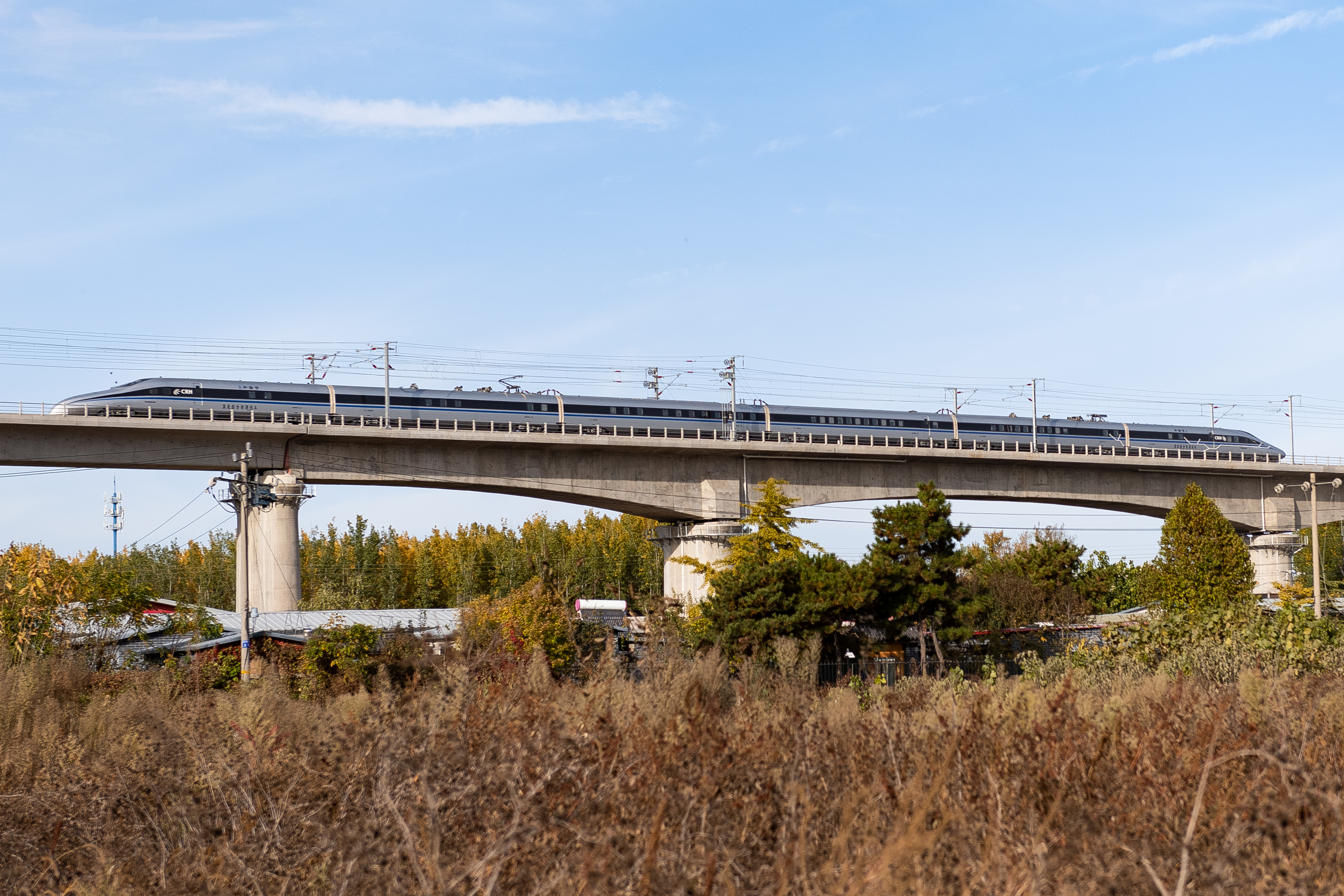
CRH380AM testing on the Beijing–Shenyang section of Beijing–Harbin high-speed railway

On December 7, 2010, during the 7th World High-speed Rail Conference held in Beijing, an officer from the CSR Group confirmed that China would perform a high-speed test in 2011 in an attempt to break the then current speed record of 574.8 km/h (357.2 mph) achieved by French trainset V150. This confirmed that CSR was developing the CIT500 (later renamed CRH380AM) trainset.

On December 22, 2011, the train, officially named "Higher Speed Experimental Train", rolled off the production line. It is scheduled to enter testing in the near future. The train set is composed of 6 motored cars with a power output of 22,800 kW (30,575 hp), which results in an extremely high power to weight ratio.

=== CRH2J ===
CRH2J-0205 (formerly CRH2-139E) is a 250 km/h high-speed comprehensive inspection train. This train was involved in the 2011 Wenzhou train collision as D301. Following the incident, the train was converted by the China Railway Corporation into a comprehensive inspection train, becoming CRH2J-0205. Under the guise of a major overhaul, it was rebuilt from cars 10 through 13, 15, and 16, and two new cars were constructed.

=== CR400BF-J-0511 ===
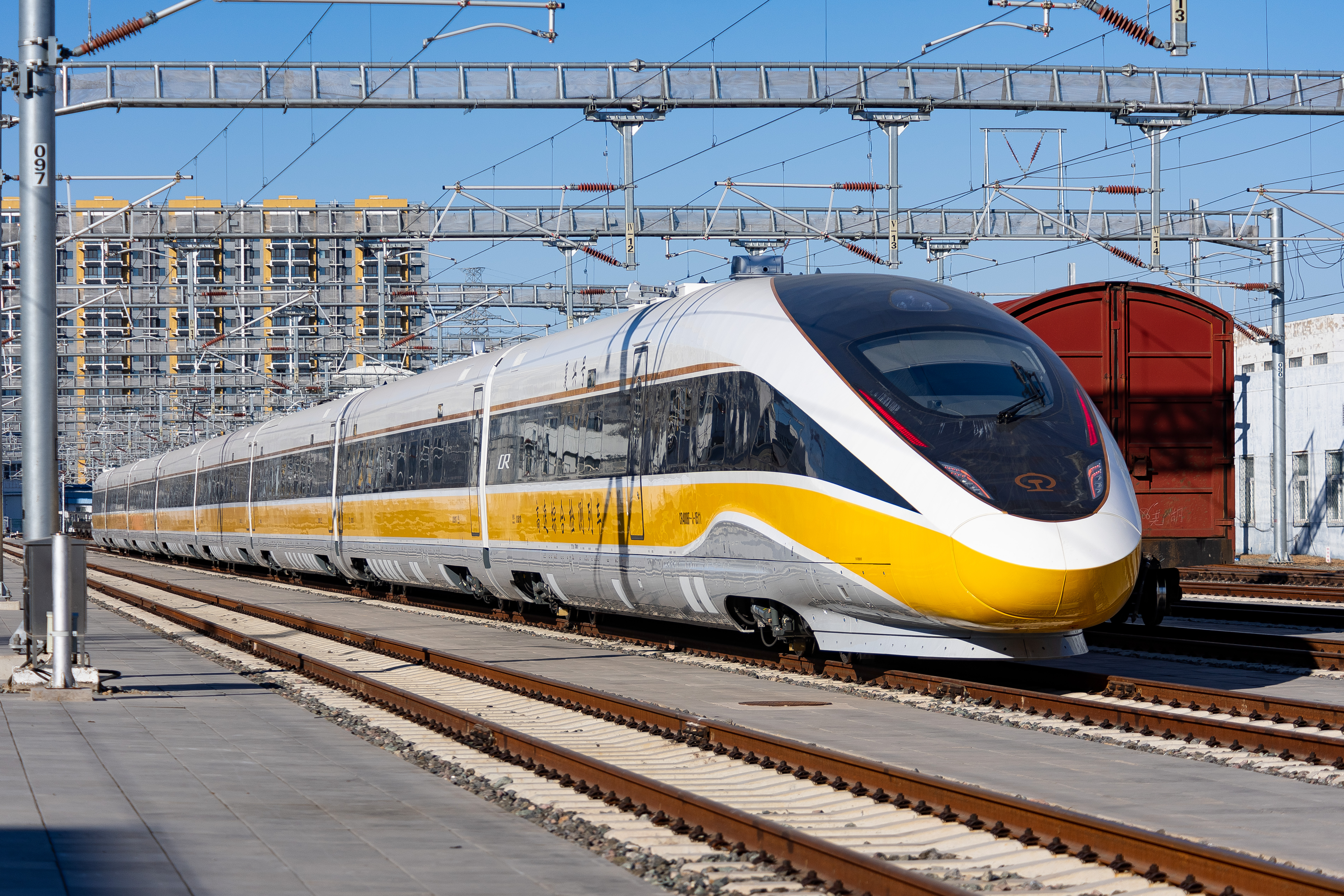
CR400BF-J-0511 in the National Railway Test Center, Beijing

CR400BF-J-0511 is based on the CR400BF-C which was designed for the Beijing–Zhangjiakou intercity railway. The train has its bogies of cars 3 and 6 equipped with eddy current brake.

== See also ==
- Doctor Yellow, high-speed inspection trains on the Japanese Shinkansen network
- TGV Iris 320, high-speed inspection trains on the French TGV network
- New Measurement Train, a British departmental train operated by Network Rail for track surveying, based on the British Rail Class 43 HST
