= The Center, New Mexico =

The Center for Innovation, Testing and Evaluation
- Established: TBA
- Research type: Applied simulation; Unclassified
- Budget: $1 billion
- Field of research: Renewable energy
- Location: between Las Cruces and Deming, New Mexico, United States of America
- Operating agency: Pegasus Global Holdings
- Website: www.cite-city.com

The Center, officially known as The Center for Innovation, Testing and Evaluation, is a proposed facility designed to test new technologies, particularly renewable natural energy. It was originally to have been located on about 15 square miles near the town of Hobbs in Lea County, New Mexico it was to have been a city with no permanent population. Due to the lack of people, The Center was described as a ghost town, since it will not have permanent residents occupying the facilities located on site. Construction was scheduled to start in June 2012, but was cancelled in July 2012. Pegasus Global Holdings' decision to build the city arose from their own testing needs.

The project appeared to be temporarily halted in 2013; however, a new report in May 2015 reported that Pegasus was resuming planning and building efforts for the project. Pegasus plans for the facility to begin its first operations as early as 2018. One of the aimed goals and purposes of the facility besides the development, testing and implementation of cutting-edge technologies is to further and harness the return on investments made in science and technology research.

== Design ==
The purpose of The Center is to “provide the opportunity for 'end-to-end' testing, evaluation and demonstration of new intelligent and green technologies and innovations such as for example an energy district to generate electricity through various forms of cutting edge power generating technologies e.g. solar, wind, hydrogen, thorium, geothermal energy plants. Because it is a city, The Center’s testing environment would have been more realistic than a laboratory's. In order to be useful for testing new technologies, The Center would have had functional utilities and telecommunications. The design of the center was inspired in part by Walt Disney World. Like Disney, The Center has the “fun stuff” above ground, while the maintenance systems would have been largely underground. The Center's lack of residents enabled experiments as well. Researchers could have tested potentially dangerous technology, like driverless vehicles, without putting anyone in harm's way. In addition to addressing safety concerns, The Center would have allow researchers to experiment with technology that, “for practical, financial, safety [or] bureaucratic…reasons,” could not be done in an inhabited area.

== Location ==
Lea County, New Mexico, announced project location

In May 2012, Pegasus announced the selection of Lea County, west of the city of Hobbs, as the project location. Reasons cited were the availability of land, community support, and existing infrastructure for its choice. The other location finalist was Las Cruces in Doña Ana County. Pegasus said that the new "city" will be modeled closely on the real-life city of Rock Hill, South Carolina. Robert Brumley, Pegasus Global Holdings’ CEO, chose Rock Hill as the model when he saw it from an airplane while flying back to his office from a design meeting about the project, where the participants had discussed the need for a city that combined old and new construction materials and styles and urban and suburban growth patterns.

When the proposal was initially announced, the location for the Center was unspecified but was to be located somewhere in the state of New Mexico. The Albuquerque-Santa Fe corridor and land near Las Cruces were named as possible locations. The company said it was looking into something close to the Interstate 40/Interstate 25 corridor or the I-25/I-10 corridor to put the facility close to the national labs, the state's universities and military installations. Pegasus sought to build on public land but had received many offers from owners of private land. Robert Brumley said New Mexico was chosen in part because “the state’s leadership in science and technology, strong university system, national laboratories, military bases, renewable energy resources, developing commercial space industry, motivated work force, and land availability made New Mexico an ideal location for The Center.” The Center will make money by charging the researchers for access and through user fees. Additionally, The Center will sell its surplus of utilities, “such as power generation, water treatment, and wireless infrastructure.” A third source of revenue will be created by subleasing some of the land outside The Center for the construction of an inhabited town for visitors to The Center. Pegasus Global Holdings hoped to begin creating The Center in June 2012 and be operational by June 2014.

In July 2012, Pegasus announced that they were pulling out of the deal because of problems acquiring land. Pegasus was reported to be reviewing proposals for other locations. In June 2014, new reports stated that development had been delayed pending determination of the borders of the new Organ Mountains–Desert Peaks National Monument, and that Pegasus had now selected a new location for the project, on Interstate 10 between Las Cruces and Deming, in Doña Ana County and Luna County.

== Pegasus Global Holdings ==
Washington, D.C.–based Pegasus Global Holdings estimates that the cost of construction of The Center will be about $1 billion. It will be one of only a few private companies to have built such a testing site. Pegasus Global Holdings also expects to create 350 jobs with this project, and indirectly create 3,900 more as a result of associated needs. The company currently has a Memorandum of Understanding with the State of New Mexico to study the project's requirements, and plans to conduct a five-month feasibility study. The State of New Mexico, which has already been working with Pegasus Global Holdings for over a year, is assisting with this study through non-financial means. A presentation on the project was made to the Dona Ana County County Commission in January 2013, which expressed support in a non-binding motion.
