= Gibson Citation =

The Gibson Citation was a top-of-the-line archtop guitar, introduced in 1969 by Gibson and still available (as of 27 July 2017) from the Gibson Custom Shop on special order. It had a 17" full-depth body with figured maple back and sides and a carved maple or spruce top with fancy inlays. The neck was made of figured maple or mahogany.

The Citation was typically equipped with a gold-covered floating BJB pickup, and was available in natural and sunburst finishes. Only about eight to ten Citation guitars were shipped during the original production run, which ended in 1971.

Gibson reissued the Citation with the same specifications and features in 1979, and again discontinued it in 1983. In 1993, Gibson introduced another reissue of the Citation. It is now part of Gibson's Historic Collection.
