= Citation (album) =

Studio album by Scott Miller
- Released: March 24, 2006
- Genre: Rock and roll
- Label: Sugar Hill
- Producer: Jim Dickinson

Scott Miller chronology
Upside Downside (2003)	Citation (2006)	Reconstruction (2007)

Citation is the 4th album recorded by alternative country musician Scott Miller. It was released on March 24, 2006.

Professional ratings
Review scores
Source	Rating
Allmusic	link

== Track listing ==
All tracks by Scott Miller

1. "Summons" – 0:25
2. "Freedom Is A Stranger" – 3:44
3. "Wild Things" – 2:42
4. "Still People Are Moving" – 4:53
5. "The Only Road" (Mic Harrison, Brad Henderson, Miller) – 3:34
6. "Only Everything" – 3:07
7. "8 Miles A Gallon" – 2:50
8. "Jody" – 3:04
9. "Hawks and Doves" (Neil Young) – 3:19
10. "Say Ho" – 3:00
11. "On A Roll" – 2:46
12. "Long Goodnight" – 2:25

== Personnel ==
- Scott Miller - vocals, guitar, harmonica
- Kristin Barlowe – photography
- Jim DeMain – mastering
- Jim Dickinson – producer, liner notes
- Eric Fritsch – guitar, keyboards, vocals
- Kevin Houston – engineer
- Shawn McWilliams – drums, vocals
- Jeremy Pennebaker - bass, vocals
- Sue Meyer – design
