= MaK DE 1002 =

Diesel-electric locomotive

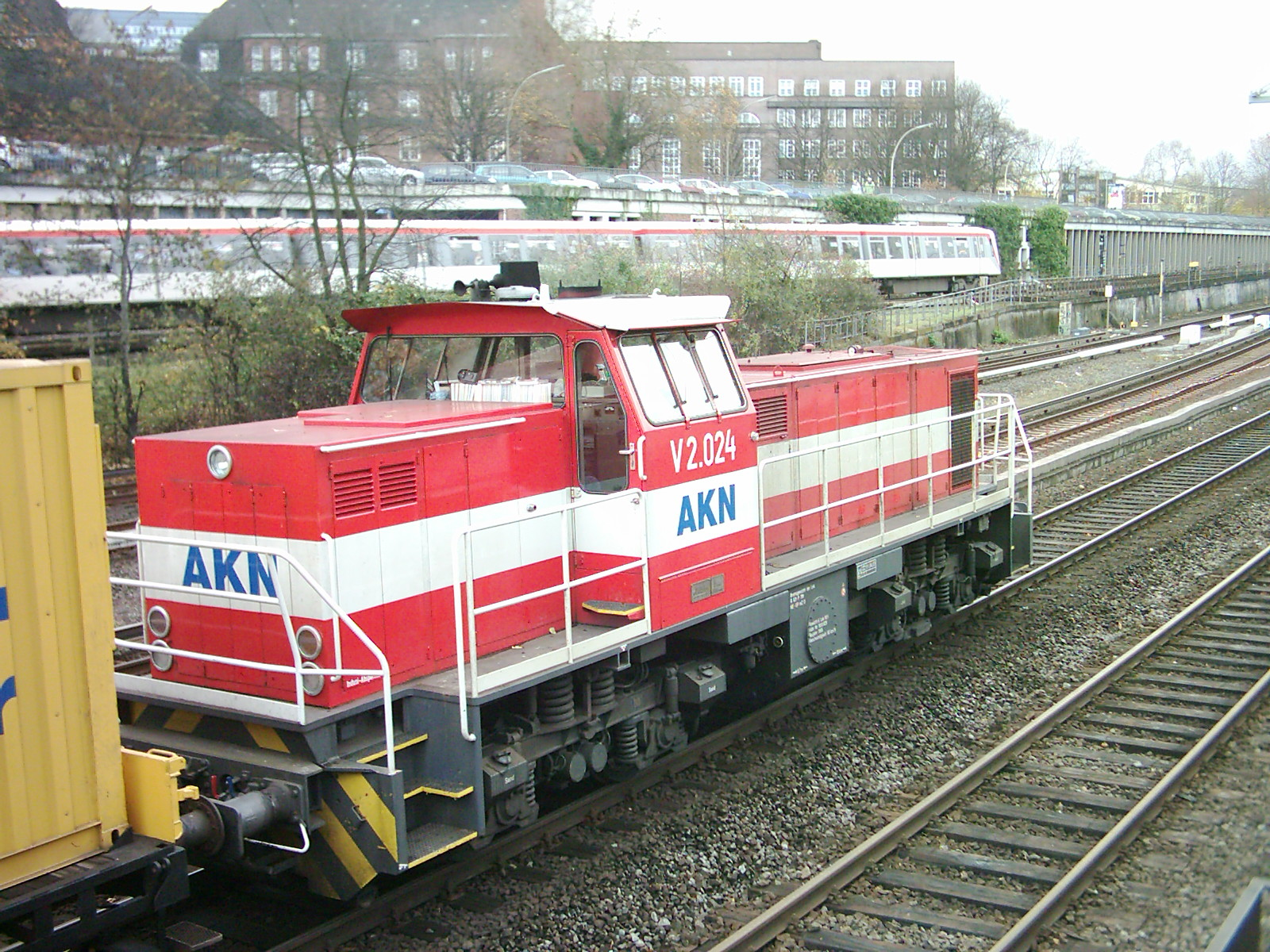
- AKN Eisenbahn MaK DE 1002
Type and origin
- Builder: MaK, BBC/ABB
- Build date: 1981–1993
- Total produced: 24
Specifications
- Configuration
  - UIC: Bo′Bo′
- Gauge: 1,435 mm (4 ft 8 1/2 in)
- Minimum curve: 60 m (197 ft)
- Wheelbase: bogie centre distance 6.700 m (21 ft 11.8 in) axle distance 2.100 m (6 ft 10.68 in)
- Length: 13.000 m (42 ft 7.8 in)
- Width: 3.100 m (10 ft 2.05 in)
- Height: 4.220 m (13 ft 10.14 in)
- Loco weight: 80–100 t (79–98 long tons; 88–110 short tons)
- Fuel capacity: 2,900 L (640 imp gal; 770 US gal)
- Prime mover: MTU 12V396TC13 or MWM TBD604BV12
- Transmission: diesel electric
Performance figures
- Maximum speed: 90 km/h (56 mph)
- Power output: 1,120 kW (1,500 hp) or 1,320 kW (1,770 hp)*
- For Köln-Bonner Eisenbahnen (KBE), Köln-Frechen-Benzelrather Eisenbahn (KFBE), and Häfen und Güterverkehr Köln (HGK)

The MaK DE 1002 is a class of 4 axle Bo′Bo′ diesel-electric locomotives built by Maschinenbau Kiel in association with Brown, Boveri & Cie (later ABB Group).

== Design and operation ==
The locomotives are a standard MaK off-centre cab design similar in appearance and power to the contemporary MaK G 1204 BB diesel-hydraulic locomotives, but with an electrical transmission supplied by BBC, (later ABB).

Eight locomotives were built with MTU engines for a variety of German private railway operators.

Sixteen locomotives were built with higher powered MWM engines; five for Köln-Bonner Eisenbahn (KBE), five for Köln-Frechen-Benzelrather Eisenbahn (KFBE), and six for Häfen und Güterverkehr Köln (HGK). All sixteen locomotive became the property of HGK in 1992 on the reorganisation of the Stadtwerke Köln (Cologne city corporation). Since 1992 the HGK locomotives carry the numbers DE 71 to DE 76, DE 81 to DE 86, and DE 91 to 94.

== Developments ==
The Eurotunnel Class 0001 and NS Class 6400 are related diesel electric developments of this type, with additional specific features for the railway customers.
