= NS Class 6400 =

Locomotive class of 120 Dutch Bo′Bo' diesel-electric locomotives

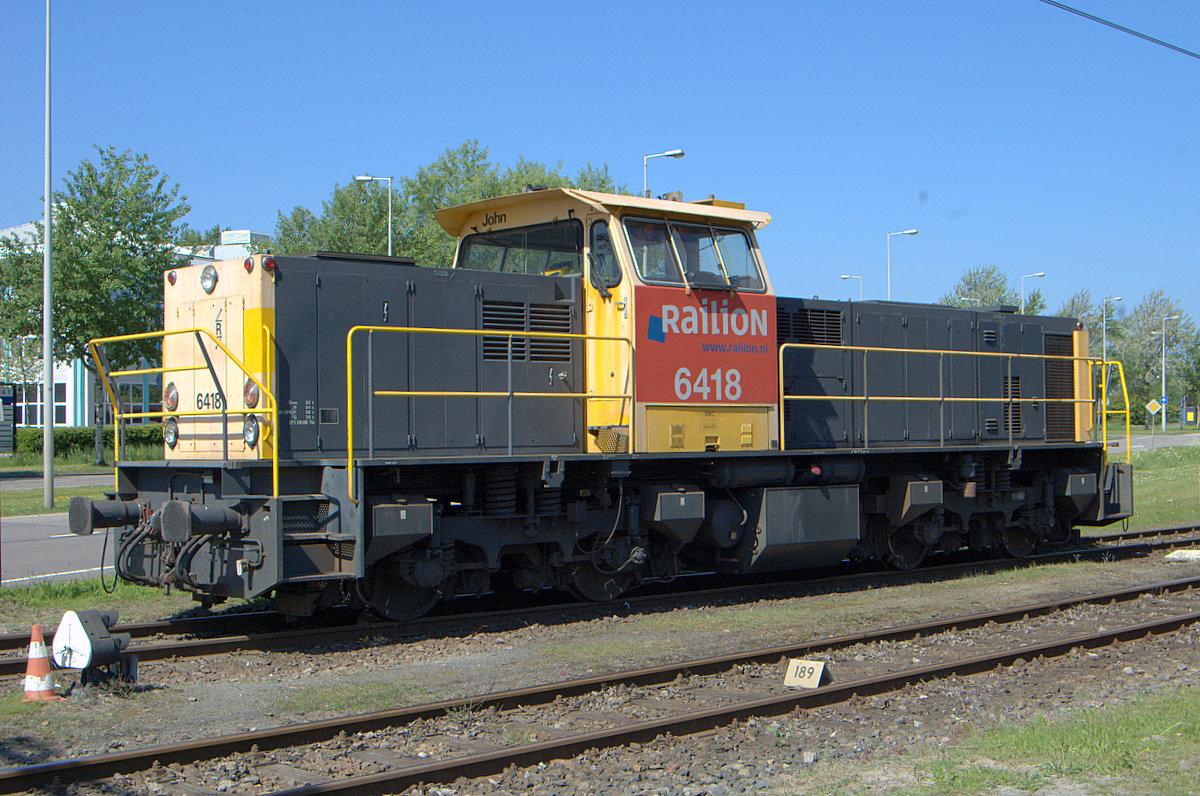
- Railion 6418 "John" (2009)
Type and origin
- Builder: MaK / ABB
- Build date: 1988–1994
- Total produced: 120
Specifications
- Configuration
  - UIC: Bo′Bo′
- Gauge: 1,435 mm (4 ft 8 1/2 in) standard gauge
- Wheelbase: bogie center distance 7.400 m (24 ft 3 3/8 in)
- Length: 14.400 m (47 ft 2 7/8 in)
- Width: 2.400 m (7 ft 10 1/2 in)
- Loco weight: 80 tonnes (79 long tons; 88 short tons)
- Fuel capacity: 2,900 L (640 imp gal; 770 US gal)
- Prime mover: MTU 12V396TC13
- Transmission: Diesel electric
Performance figures
- Maximum speed: 120 km/h (75 mph)
- Power output: 1,180 kW (1,580 hp)
- Tractive effort: 290 kN (65,000 lb_{f})
Career
- Operators: Railion Nederland
- Nicknames: Duitse Herder, Vlaamse Reus (Note: Duitse Herder and Vlaamse Reus; Dutch for German Shepherd Dog and Flemish Giant rabbit)

The NS Class 6400 is a type of Bo-Bo diesel-electric freight locomotive. 120 were built by MaK and ABB between 1988 and 1994 for Nederlandse Spoorwegen.

== Design and description ==
The locomotives were the result of a contract won by MaK and Brown, Boveri & Cie to replace Nederlandse Spoorwegen's old medium power locomotives. (Note: The NS Class 2200 and NS Class 2400) The design is based upon the MaK DE 1002 with modifications; the locomotives are 1.4 m (4 ft 7 1/8 in) longer to incorporate additional equipment, in particular an auxiliary diesel generator, as well as ATB equipment; the bogies are longer than on the DE 1002 to incorporate tread brakes instead of disc brakes.

== Operations and operators ==
For Nederlandse Spoorwegen 120 of these locomotives were built, numbered 6401–6520.

The locomotives became the property of NS Cargo, and then Railion Benelux when the company merged with DB Cargo in 2000. The locomotives subsequently became the property of the successor companies; Railion Nederland, then DB Schenker Rail Nederland (part of the DB Schenker group).

Some locomotives have had PZB (Indusi) or Memor safety systems installed to allow operations in Germany or Belgium.

The class can be seen over the whole country, with many to be found at Amsterdam Westhaven, Kijfhoek Yard, Roosendaal, Tilburg, Emmerich am Rhein (Germany), Amersfoort, Venlo, Zwolle and many other places. The locomotives often work in pairs or in threes on heavy trains.

Many of the locomotives carry boys' names; these are from the names of Dutch notables, often directors of companies and businessmen; e.g. 6401 was named Mijndert after Mijndert Pon, director of the Pon company.

In November 2010 two units were sold to Eurotunnel in 2010 to operate alongside the existing Class 0001 locomotives. Eurotunnel acquired another three in 2016.

Due to the economic downturn of the late 2000s, in 2011 numbers 6401–6410, 6419, 6420, 6443–6460, 6462, 6471–6475, 6480–6494, 6496, 6498 and 6501–6503 were out of service.

=== Accidents ===
In 1993 several locomotives were sent to the Norwegian State Railways (NSB) for assessment. On 3 October 1993 locomotive 6454 ran away downhill 5 km (3.1 mi) outside Nordstrand Station; it collided with a stationary passenger train in the station, resulting in the death of five people. As a result of the apparent brakes failure all the class were taken out of service; it transpired that mechanical failure was not the cause and that the brakes had been rendered inactive by a control valve closed in the wrong position during maintenance.

On 24 September 2009 locomotives 6415 and 6514 were involved in a head-on collision with an EMD 66 locomotive of ERS (No. 6616) near Barendrecht. One of the drivers was killed and the other seriously injured. Both 6400 series locomotives were scrapped. (see Barendrecht train accident.)

Locomotives 6424, 6429, 6430, 6442, 6444, 6465, 6491, 6493, 6497, 6499, 6516 6520 also have been damaged in collisions, 6437 was damaged by run away wagons, 6501 was involved in a crash with a tram.

== Liveries ==
The locomotives were originally in NS grey and yellow, except the last 10 units (6511–6520) which were in a red livery with diagonal white stripe on the front surface. After takeover by Railion locomotives received a red Railion sticker on the side, later some locomotives received a red railion livery. A small number of units also received RailPro livery and branding. The locomotive names are carried on the cab fronts between the roof and top of the windows.

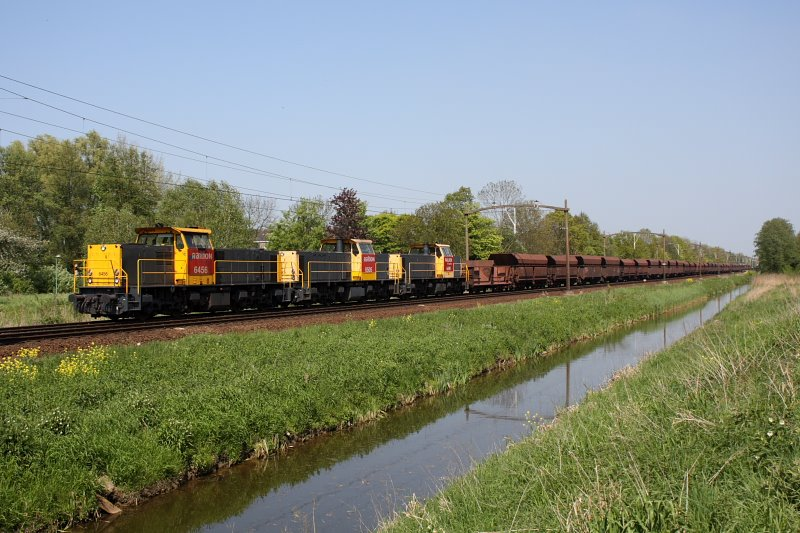
Three NS 6400 units

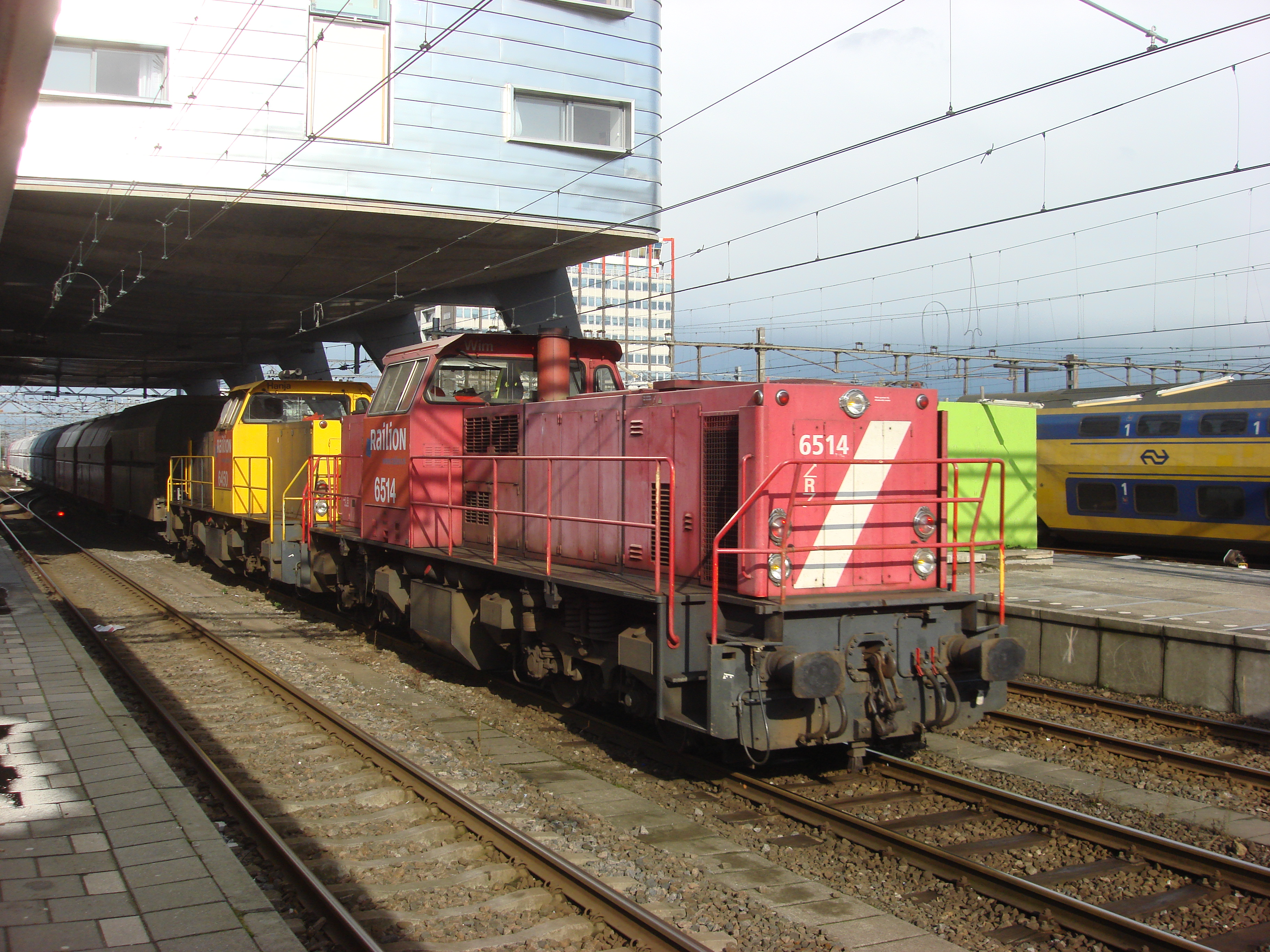
Red painted NS 6514, later involved in the Barendrecht train accident.

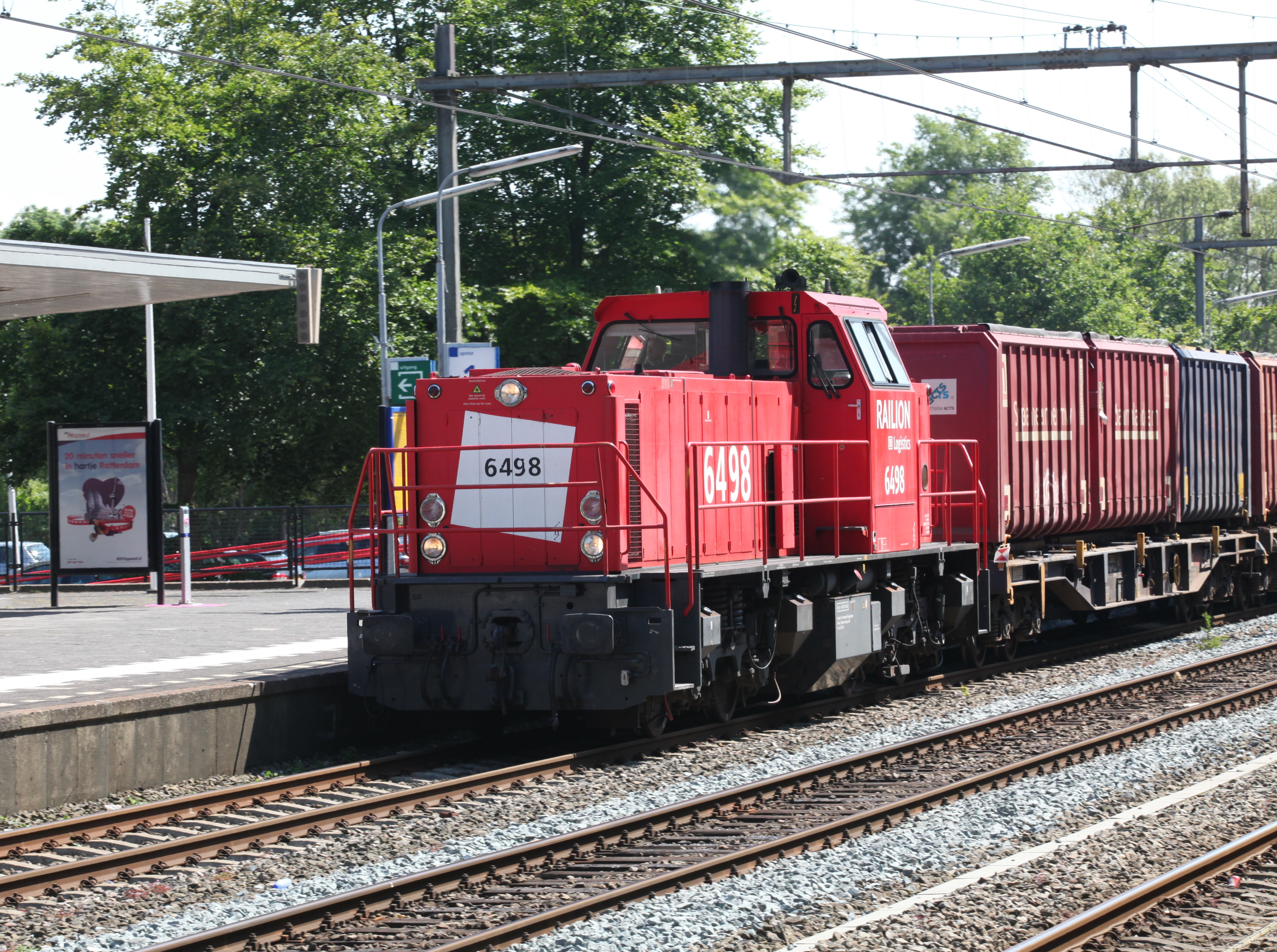
Railion liveried locomotive

== See also ==
- Barendrecht train accident
- MaK DE 1004 aka "Eurotunnel Class 0001", similar design locomotives built for eurotunnel as rescue locomotives; fitted with special smoke filtration equipment for tunnel use.
- NSB Di 8 diesel electric locomotives ordered as a result of the NS 6400 trials in Norway.
