= List of border crossing points in France =

External image
- Map of permanent border crossing points in France

The following is a list of border crossing points in France (French: points de passages frontaliers, or "PPF") forming the external border of the Schengen Area. By contrast, the term points de passages autorisés ("PPA") refers to the crossing points at the border between France and other Schengen countries (i.e. internal borders of the Schengen Area).

At the main border crossing points that receive traffic from outside the Schengen Area, the Police aux Frontières carries out immigration checks, whilst Customs are responsible for customs checks. At smaller regional border crossing points that receive limited traffic from outside the Schengen Area, Customs are responsible for carrying out both immigration and customs checks.

PARAFE self-service gates have been installed at a number of border crossing points to facilitate passage for eligible travellers (European Economic Area, Andorran, Monégasque, San Marinese and Swiss biometric passport holders aged 18 or over).

== Air borders ==
Border crossing point	French agency responsible for checks		Nature of presence	Flights to/from outside the Schengen Area
Border crossing point	Immigration	Customs	Nature of presence	Flights to/from outside the Schengen Area
Abbeville Airfield	Customs	Customs	On request	Infrequent charter flights
Agen La Garenne Airport	Customs	Customs	On request	Infrequent charter flights
Ajaccio Napoleon Bonaparte Airport	Police aux frontières	Customs	Permanent	Seasonal scheduled flights (London Gatwick)
Albert–Picardie Airport	Customs	Customs	On request	Infrequent charter flights
Amiens – Glisy Aerodrome	Customs	Customs	On request	Infrequent charter flights
Angers–Loire Airport	Customs	Customs	On request	Seasonal scheduled flights (London City)
Angoulême–Cognac International Airport	Customs	Customs	On request	Infrequent charter flights
Annecy–Haute-Savoie–Mont Blanc Airport	Customs	Customs	On request	Infrequent charter flights
Annemasse Aerodrome	Customs	Customs	On request	Infrequent charter flights
Auxerre–Branches Aerodrome	Customs	Customs	On request	Infrequent charter flights
Avignon–Provence Airport	Customs	Customs	On request	Seasonal scheduled flights (Birmingham, Exeter, London City, Southampton)
Bastia–Poretta Airport	Police aux frontières	Customs	On request outside peak season	Seasonal scheduled flights (London Gatwick, London Heathrow, Manchester)
Beauvais–Tillé Airport	Police aux frontières	Customs	On request outside peak season	Regular scheduled flights (Bacău, Bucharest-Henri Coandă, Chișinău , Cluj-Napoca, Dublin, Edinburgh, Fez, Glasgow-Prestwick, Knock, Manchester, Marrakech, Nador, Pula, Sofia, Tangier, Târgu Mureș, Timișoara )
Bergerac Dordogne Périgord Airport	Customs	Customs	On request	Regular scheduled flights (Birmingham, Bristol, East Midlands, Edinburgh, Exeter, Leeds/Bradford, Liverpool, London Gatwick, London Stansted, Southampton)
Besançon – La Vèze Aerodrome	Customs	Customs	On request	Infrequent charter flights
Béziers Cap d'Agde Airport	Customs	Customs	On request	Seasonal scheduled flights (Bristol, London Luton, Manchester, Southampton)
Biarritz Pays Basque Airport	Police aux frontières	Customs	On request	Seasonal scheduled flights (Dublin, London Gatwick, London Stansted, Manchester)
Bordeaux–Mérignac Airport	Police aux frontières	Customs	Permanent	Regular scheduled flights (Agadir, Algiers, Casablanca, London Gatwick, London Luton, Marrakech, Tunis), seasonal scheduled flights (Bristol, Cork, Dublin, Edinburgh, Liverpool, Montréal-Trudeau, Oran, Southampton)
Brest Bretagne Airport	Customs	Customs	On request outside peak season	Regular scheduled flights (London City, Marrakech)
Brive–Souillac Airport	Customs	Customs	On request	Seasonal scheduled flights (London City)
Caen–Carpiquet Airport	Police aux frontières	Customs	Permanent	Regular scheduled flights (London Southend)
Calais–Dunkerque Airport	Customs	Customs	On request outside peak season	Infrequent charter flights
Calvi–Sainte-Catherine Airport	Police aux frontières	Customs	On request outside peak season	Seasonal charter flights (London Stansted)
Cannes–Mandelieu Airport	Customs	Customs	On request outside peak season	Infrequent charter flights
Carcassonne Airport	Customs	Customs	On request	Regular scheduled flights (Dublin, Liverpool, London Stansted) and seasonal scheduled flights (Bournemouth, Cork, East Midlands, Glasgow-Prestwick)
Chalon–Champforgeuil Airfield	Customs	Customs	On request	Infrequent charter flights
Chambéry Airport	Customs	Customs	On request	Seasonal scheduled flights (Birmingham, Bristol, Exeter, East Midlands, Edinburgh, Leeds/Bradford, London City, London Gatwick, London Stansted, Manchester, Newcastle, Southampton) and seasonal charter flights (Cardiff, Dublin, Glasgow, Moscow-Domodedovo)
Châteauroux-Centre "Marcel Dassault" Airport	Customs	Customs	On request	Infrequent charter flights
Cherbourg–Maupertus Airport	Customs	Customs	On request	Infrequent charter flights
Clermont-Ferrand Auvergne Airport	Police aux frontières	Customs	On request outside peak season	Seasonal scheduled flights (Southampton)
Colmar Airport	Customs	Customs	On request	Infrequent charter flights
Deauville–Normandie Airport	Customs	Customs	On request outside peak season	Seasonal scheduled flights (London City) and charter flights (Agadir, Marrakech)
Dijon – Bourgogne Airport	Customs	Customs	On request	Seasonal scheduled flights (Southampton)
Dinard–Pleurtuit–Saint-Malo Airport	Customs	Customs	On request outside peak season	Regular scheduled flights (East Midlands, Guernsey, London Stansted) and seasonal charter flights (Leeds/Bradford)
Épinal–Mirecourt Airport	Customs	Customs	On request	Infrequent charter flights
Figari–Sud Corse Airport	Police aux frontières	Customs	On request outside peak season	Seasonal scheduled flights (London Gatwick, Manchester)
Alpes–Isère Airport	Customs	Customs	On request outside peak season	Seasonal scheduled flights (Birmingham, Bristol, Edinburgh, Guernsey, Leeds/Bradford, Liverpool, London Gatwick, London Luton, London Stansted, Manchester) and seasonal charter flights (Kyiv-Boryspil, Moscow-Vnukovo, Southampton, Tel Aviv-Ben Gurion)
La Rochelle–Île de Ré Airport	Customs	Customs	On request outside peak season	Seasonal scheduled flights (Birmingham, Bristol, Cork, Dublin, East Midlands, Edinburgh, Leeds/Bradford, London Gatwick, London Stansted, Manchester)
Lannion–Côte de Granit Airport	Customs	Customs	On request	Infrequent charter flights
Le Havre–Octeville Airport	Customs	Customs	On request	Infrequent charter flights
Lille Airport	Police aux frontières	Customs	Permanent	Regular scheduled flights (Algiers, Oran, Tlemcen, Tunis)
Limoges–Bellegarde Airport	Customs	Customs	On request	Regular scheduled flights (Bristol, East Midlands, Leeds/Bradford, Liverpool, London Stansted, Newcastle, Southampton)
Lorient South Brittany Airport	Customs	Customs	On request	Infrequent charter flights
Lyon–Saint-Exupéry Airport	Police aux frontières	Customs	Permanent	Regular scheduled flights (Agadir, Algiers, Annaba, Batna, Béjaïa, Biskra, Bodrum, Bucharest-Henri Coandă, Casablanca, Chlef, Constantine, Dakar, Djerba, Douala, Dublin, Istanbul-Atatürk, Jijel, London Gatwick, London Heathrow, Manchester, Marrakech, Monastir, Moscow-Domodedovo, Oran, Sétif, Sfax, Southampton, Tozeur, Tlemcen, Tunis, Yaoundé), seasonal scheduled flights (Antalya, Bodrum, Izmir, Montreal–Trudeau, Split, Yerevan) and charter flights (Burgas, Dubrovnik, London Luton, London Stansted, Shannon, Varna)
Marseille Provence Airport	Police aux frontières	Customs	Permanent	Regular scheduled flights (Agadir, Algiers, Annaba, Antalya, Antananarivo, Batna, Béjaïa, Biskra, Bodrum, Casablanca, Chlef, Constantine, Dakar, Djerba, Istanbul-Sabiha Gökçen, London Gatwick, London Stansted, Marrakech, Monastir, Moscow-Sheremetyevo, Oran, Sétif, Sfax, Tlemcen, Tozeur, Tunis, Yaoundé) and seasonal scheduled flights (Bristol, Dublin, Montreal–Trudeau, Quebec City, Toronto-Pearson, Yerevan)
Metz–Nancy–Lorraine Airport	Customs	Customs	On request	Regular scheduled flights (Algiers), seasonal scheduled flights (Constantine, Oran) and seasonal charter flights
Montpellier–Méditerranée Airport	Customs	Customs	On request	Regular scheduled flights (Casablanca, Fez, Nador) and seasonal scheduled flights (Algiers, Leeds/Bradford, London Luton, Oran)
Nantes Atlantique Airport	Police aux frontières	Customs	On request outside peak season	Regular scheduled flights (Agadir, Casablanca, London City, Marrakech) and seasonal scheduled flights (Djerba, Dublin, Larnaca, London Gatwick, Manchester, Monastir, Montréal-Trudeau, Shannon, Southampton, Toronto-Pearson, Tunis)
Nice Côte d'Azur Airport	Police aux frontières	Customs	Permanent	Regular scheduled flights (Algiers, Agadir, Bucharest-Henri Coandă, Casablanca, Constantine, Djerba, Doha, Dubai, Dublin, Istanbul-Atatürk, Liverpool, London Gatwick, London Heathrow, London Luton, London Stansted, Marrakech, Monastir, Moscow-Sheremetyevo, St Petersburg, Tel Aviv-Ben Gurion, Tunis) and seasonal scheduled flights (Belfast-International, Beirut, Birmingham, Cork, Djerba, Nottingham/East Midlands, Edinburgh, Glasgow, Kyiv-Boryspil, Larnaca, London City, Manchester, Monastir, Montréal-Trudeau, New York-JFK, Newcastle, Olbia, Praia, Shannon, Southampton, Toronto-Pearson, Tozeur)
Nîmes–Alès–Camargue–Cévennes Airport	Customs	Customs	On request	Regular scheduled flights (London Luton) and seasonal scheduled flights (Liverpool)
Charles de Gaulle Airport	Police aux frontières	Customs	Permanent	Regular scheduled flights
Paris Orly Airport	Police aux frontières	Customs	Permanent	Regular scheduled flights (Abidjan, Agadir, Aleppo, Algiers, Annaba, Antananarivo, Bamako, Batna, Béjaïa, Biskra, Bodrum, Constantine, Dakar, Damascus, Djanet, Djerba, Essaouira, Fes, Havana, Istanbul-Sabiha Gökçen, Izmir, Kayes, London City, London Heathrow, Luxor, Marrakech, Mauritius, Miami, Monastir, Montréal–Trudeau, Newark, Oran, Ouagadougou, Ouarzazate, Oujda, Rabat, Santiago de Cuba, Sétif, Sfax, Southampton, Tamanrasset, Tangier, Tehran-Imam Khomeini, Tlemcen, Tozeur, Tunis)
Pau Pyrénées Airport	Customs	Customs	On request	Regular scheduled flights (London City) and seasonal scheduled flights (Dublin)
Perpignan–Rivesaltes Airport	Customs	Customs	On request	Seasonal scheduled flights (Birmingham, Dublin, London Stansted, Southampton)
Poitiers–Biard Airport	Customs	Customs	On request	Seasonal scheduled flights (Edinburgh, London Stansted, Manchester)
Quimper–Bretagne Airport	Customs	Customs	On request	Seasonal scheduled flights (London City)
Rennes–Saint-Jacques Airport	Customs	Customs	On request	Regular scheduled flights (Southampton) and seasonal scheduled flights (Cork, Dublin, Exeter, Manchester, Shannon)
Rodez–Aveyron Airport	Customs	Customs	On request	Regular scheduled flights (London Stansted) and seasonal scheduled flights (Dublin)
Rouen Airport	Customs	Customs	On request	Infrequent charter flights
Saint-Brieuc–Armor Airport	Customs	Customs	On request	Infrequent charter flights
Saint-Étienne–Bouthéon Airport	Customs	Customs	On request	Regular scheduled flights (Istanbul-Sabiha Gökçen)
Saint-Nazaire Montoir Airport	Customs	Customs	On request	Infrequent charter flights

== Land borders ==
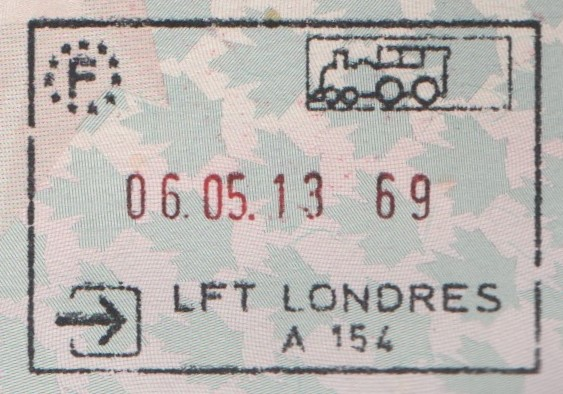
A passport stamp issued by the Police aux Frontières at the juxtaposed controls at St Pancras railway station. 'LFT' stands for 'Liaison fixe transmanche' (literally Fixed cross-Channel link).

Metropolitan France's only land border with a non-Schengen country is with Andorra, while the Channel Tunnel forms a railway link with the United Kingdom. The overseas departments and territories of France are not part of the Schengen Area. French Guiana borders Brazil and Suriname, whereas Saint-Martin borders Sint Maarten.

In the 1991 Sangatte Protocol, France signed an agreement with the United Kingdom to introduce 'juxtaposed controls' (in French, des bureaux de contrôles nationaux juxtaposés, or 'BCNJ') at Eurostar and Eurotunnel stations.

This means that, when travelling from the UK to France by Eurostar, French immigration checks are carried out by the Police aux Frontières on British soil before boarding the train, whilst French customs checks take place upon arrival on French soil. When travelling in the reverse direction from France to the UK by Eurostar, French immigration exit checks and British immigration checks both take place on French soil before boarding the train, whilst British customs checks take place upon arrival on British soil. The exception is at Marne-la-Vallée–Chessy, where the UK Border Force no longer maintains a full presence and passengers boarding the Eurostar there clear immigration and customs on arrival in the UK.

When travelling from the UK to France by Eurotunnel, French immigration and customs checks both take place on British soil before boarding the train. When travelling from France to the UK by Eurotunnel, after French immigration exit checks, British immigration and customs checks both take place on French soil before boarding the train shuttle.

Border crossing point	French agency responsible for checks		Nature of presence	Trains to/from outside the Schengen Area
Border crossing point	Immigration	Customs	Nature of presence	Trains to/from outside the Schengen Area
Bourg-Saint-Maurice railway station	Customs	Customs	Seasonal (beginning of December to mid-April)	Seasonal Eurostar ski service
Calais Fréthun railway station	Police aux Frontières	Customs	Permanent	Up to 3 Eurostar trains per day to/from London St Pancras, Ebbsfleet International and Ashford International.
Eurotunnel Calais Terminal, Coquelles	Police aux Frontières	Customs	Permanent	Frequent Eurotunnel Shuttle services to/from Cheriton, Kent.
Lille-Europe railway station	Police aux Frontières	Customs	Permanent	Up to 10 Eurostar trains per day to/from London St Pancras, Ebbsfleet International and Ashford International.
Marne-la-Vallée – Chessy railway station	Police aux Frontières	Customs	Permanent	Up to 1 Eurostar train per day to/from London St Pancras.
Moûtiers–Salins–Brides-les-Bains railway station	Customs	Customs	Seasonal (beginning of December to mid-April)	Seasonal Eurostar ski service
Paris North railway station	Police aux Frontières	Customs	Permanent	Up to 16 Eurostar trains per day to/from London St Pancras, Ebbsfleet International and Ashford International.
El Pas de la Casa Andorra road crossing	Police aux Frontières	Customs	Permanent	

== Maritime borders ==
In 2003, France signed an agreement with the United Kingdom to introduce 'juxtaposed controls' (in French, des bureaux de contrôles nationaux juxtaposés, or 'BCNJ') at Dover on the British side and at Calais, Dunkirk and Boulogne-sur-Mer on the French side.

This means that, when travelling from Dover to France by ferry, French immigration checks are carried out by the Police aux Frontières on British soil before boarding the ferry, whilst French customs checks take place upon arrival on French soil. When travelling in the reverse direction from Calais, Dunkirk and Boulogne-sur-Mer in France to the UK by ferry, French immigration exit checks and British immigration checks both take place on French soil before boarding the ferry, whilst British customs checks take place upon arrival on British soil.

Border crossing point	French agency responsible for checks		Nature of presence	Ferries to/from outside the Schengen Area	
Border crossing point	Immigration	Customs	Nature of presence	Company	Foreign port(s)
Caen port	Customs	Customs	Permanent	Brittany Ferries	Portsmouth
Calais port	Police aux Frontières	Customs	Permanent	DFDS Seaways and P&O Ferries	Dover
Carteret port	Police aux Frontières	Customs	Permanent	Manche Îles Express	Guernsey and Jersey
Cherbourg port	Police aux Frontières	Customs	Permanent	Brittany Ferries; Irish Ferries	Poole and Portsmouth; Rosslare
Diélette port	Customs	Customs	Permanent	Manche Îles Express	Alderney and Guernsey
Dieppe port	Police aux Frontières	Customs	Permanent	DFDS Seaways	Newhaven
Dunkirk port	Police aux Frontières	Customs	Permanent	DFDS Seaways	Dover
Granville port	Police aux Frontières	Customs	Permanent	Manche Îles Express	Jersey
Le Havre port	Police aux Frontières	Customs	Permanent	LD Lines	Portsmouth
Marseille port	Police aux Frontières	Customs	Permanent	Algérie Ferries	Algiers, Béjaïa, Oran and Skikda
Roscoff port	Customs	Customs	Permanent	Brittany Ferries; Irish Ferries	Cork and Plymouth; Rosslare
Saint-Malo port	Police aux Frontières	Customs	Permanent	Brittany Ferries; Condor Ferries	Portsmouth; Guernsey, Jersey, Poole, Weymouth
Sète port	Police aux Frontières	Customs	Permanent	Comarit	Nador and Tangier
