= Service national de la police ferroviaire =

French railway police service

National Railway Police Service Service national de la police ferroviaire
- Abbreviation: SNPF

Agency overview
- Formed: 2006

Jurisdictional structure
- National agency: France
- Operations jurisdiction: France
- General nature: Civilian police
- Specialist jurisdiction: Railways, tramways, rail transit systems

Operational structure
- Headquarters: Paris, France

The Service national de la police ferroviaire (National Railway Police Service), created on 27 June 2006, is a service of the General Directorate of the French National Police of the Central Directorate of Border Police (DCPAF), with national jurisdiction. It is responsible for the safety of passengers and railway operators on the metropolitan rail network. It carries out its missions on board trains and at railway stations, some of which are included in the perimeter of priority safety zones (ZSP).

== See also ==
- Sous-direction régionale de la police des transports (SDRPT) in Île-de-France, dependant of Paris Police Prefecture
- Groupe de protection et de sécurité des réseaux (GPSR), of the RATP.
- Sûreté ferroviaire (Suge), of the SNCF
