= LeShuttle =

Car shuttle train service between England and France

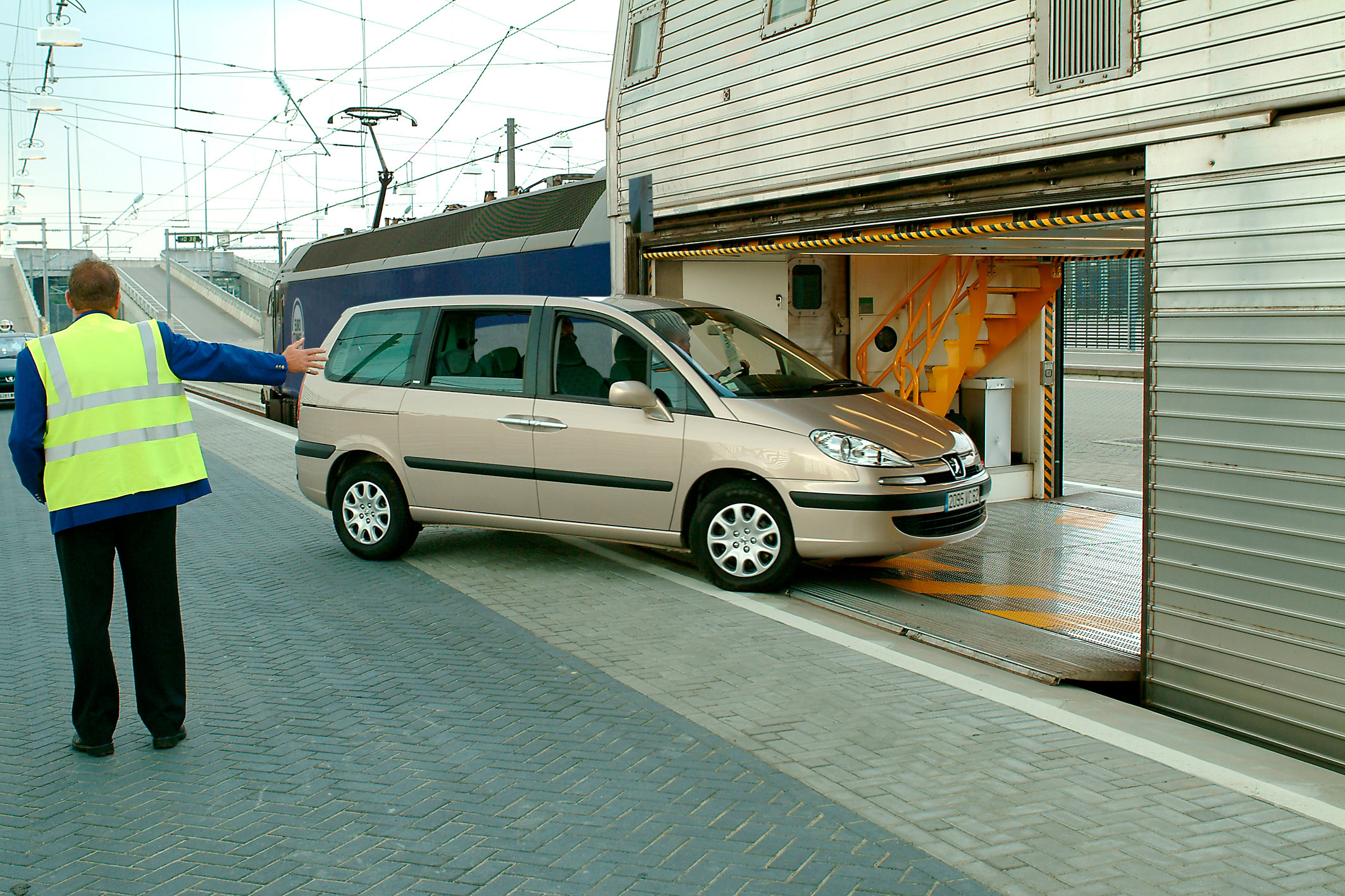

Overview
- Main stations: Folkestone, United Kingdom; Calais, France
- Fleet: 58 Eurotunnel Class 9 locomotives; 9 passenger vehicle shuttle trains; 15 heavy goods vehicle shuttle trains
- Stations called at: 2
- Parent company: Getlink
- Reporting mark: ET

Other
- Website: leshuttle.com
System map

LeShuttle (formerly Eurotunnel Le Shuttle and also known as The Shuttle) is a railway service that transports road vehicles and their passengers through the Channel Tunnel between Calais in France and Folkestone in the United Kingdom. LeShuttle (formerly Eurotunnel Le Shuttle) started operations and opened on May 6, 1994.

Smaller vehicles—including cars, vans, buses, motorcycles, and bicycles—travel inside enclosed shuttle trains, with passengers remaining alongside their vehicles. Heavy goods vehicles (HGVs) are carried on separate shuttle trains, which are largely open for safety reasons. Drivers of these freight vehicles ride in a passenger carriage known as a club car.

The service is owned and operated by Getlink, the owner of the Channel Tunnel.

== Operation ==
Both terminals are provided with vehicle check-in booths and juxtaposed controls (where pre-boarding immigration and customs checks are carried out by the French Border Police, French Customs and the UK Border Force at the same location), a large convenience outlet, long loading platforms and a loop of track. On arrival at the terminal, having booked beforehand or not, vehicles can check in (in separate freight/passenger booths). If the vehicle is too early for its booked train, the passengers may visit the terminal building with cafés and duty-free shopping, driving onto the train once called to do so.

En route to the train, passengers travel through the juxtaposed control area and are led into queues to drive onto the train. Once boarding is complete, safety announcements are played through the public address system and the train departs once the loading wagons are prepared for departure. After a train emerges from the tunnel, about 22 minutes later, it travels around the loop and stops at the terminal platform. It is then unloaded and reloaded with a new set of vehicles within just over half an hour. Arriving passengers drive their vehicles off of the train and onto the French A16 autoroute or the British M20 motorway with no further controls. During busier periods the complete journey takes at least 1 hour and 30 minutes between the highways, with the platform-to-platform crossing being 35 minutes long. During quieter periods it may be possible to board an earlier-departing train resulting in a complete journey time between the highways of just over an hour.

The rail loop at Folkestone runs clockwise and is mostly in a cut-and-cover tunnel, whereas the loop at Coquelles goes anti-clockwise and out in the open. This evens the wear on the wheels of the shuttle locomotives and carriages, as each set (left or right) spends only half the time at the outer edge of the line traversing the curves.

Interior of the LeShuttle

Depending on traffic, each hour there are between two and four passenger vehicle shuttle train departures and between four and seven heavy goods vehicle shuttle departures.

== Rolling stock ==
Boarding at the Calais Terminal

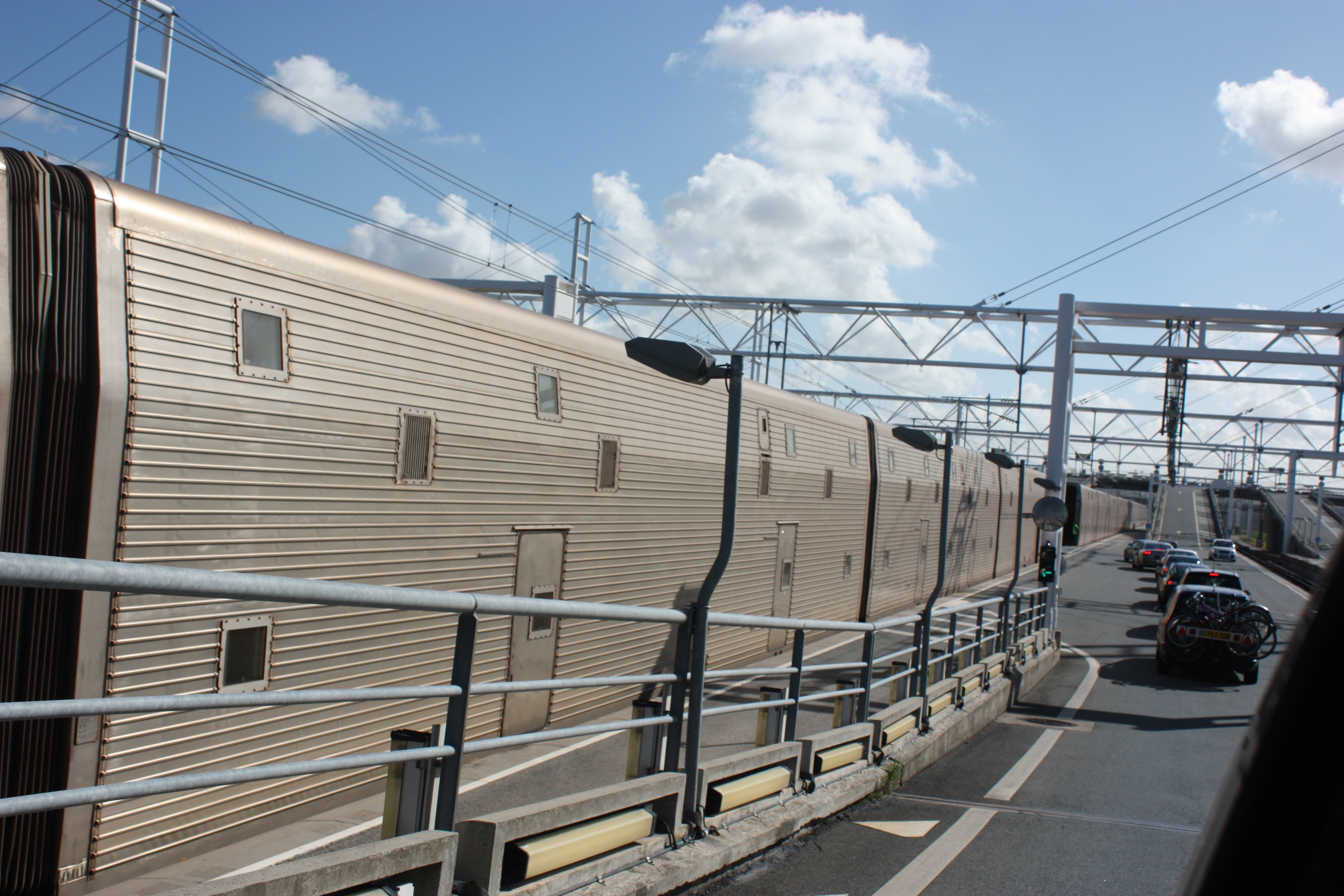
Exterior of passenger shuttle carriages, with cars queuing to board (2010)

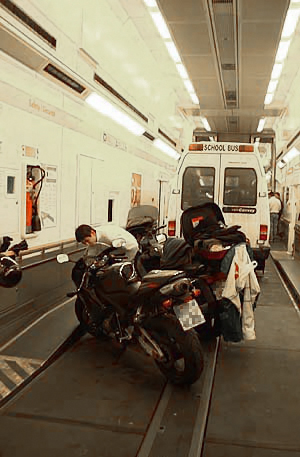
Interior of a passenger shuttle carriage

The rolling stock used for the LeShuttle service has a larger loading gauge than that of either the British or French national rail networks. As a result, the shuttle trains cannot operate outside the Channel Tunnel and its two terminals. Each train is formed of two sections (which Eurotunnel refers to as rakes), which can be uncoupled in an emergency to allow one half of a damaged train to continue out of the tunnel.

=== Passenger vehicle shuttle trains ===
LeShuttle operates nine car shuttle trains for passenger vehicles, each about 776 metres (2,550 ft) long and constructed from stainless steel. Each train consists of two sections: a single-deck portion for tall or long vehicles—such as vans, motorhomes, minibuses, coaches, and vehicles towing trailers or carrying roof racks—and a double-deck portion for vehicles under 1.85 metres (6 ft 1 in) in height. Standard cars may also be placed in unused areas of single-deck wagons.

A complete shuttle consists of 24 car-carrying wagons and four loading/unloading wagons (one at each end of each section) and can carry up to 12 coaches and 120 cars. The loading wagons are fitted with bridging plates that allow vehicles to drive between the train and the terminal platforms.

The shuttles were built by the Euroshuttle Wagon Group consortium, composed of Bombardier, BN, and ANF, with bogies supplied by GEC-Alsthom. The carriages are insulated to protect against temperature variations and are designed to resist fire for up to 30 minutes. For fire safety, each carriage is pressurised and equipped with fire-resistant end doors, as well as smoke, heat, and fire detection systems. Once loading is complete, the main doors are closed; smaller pedestrian doors allow movement between carriages while the train is in motion and close automatically after use.

Attendants manage vehicle loading, unloading, and onboard safety. While the train is underway, they patrol the carriages to monitor conditions and assist passengers as needed. To reduce staffing costs, Eurotunnel occasionally closes the upper deck of double-deck carriages when demand is low.

Passengers generally remain in their vehicles for the 35-minute journey, though they may leave to stretch or use the toilets located in every third carriage of the double-deck section and in the loading/unloading wagons of the single-deck section. No other onboard services are provided. Passengers are advised not to walk between parked vehicles except at designated crossing points, as the tunnel gradients—16 kilometres (9.9 mi) of continuous slope at 1.1% on the English side—pose a risk of vehicles rolling if parking brakes are not applied.

In 2019, Alstom (which had acquired all members of the original consortium) was awarded a contract to refurbish the passenger shuttle fleet.

=== Freight vehicle shuttle trains ===
Lorries (trucks) are carried on HGV (heavy goods vehicles) shuttles separate from passenger vehicle shuttles. LeShuttle has a fleet of 15 HGV shuttle trains which are each 800 metres (2,600 ft) long with a locomotive on each end, 31 or 32 mostly open vehicle-carrying wagons (train cars), three loading/unloading wagons (one on either side of the train and one in the middle), and a single passenger carriage called the "club car" which is 25.72 m (84 ft 5 in) long. The vehicle-carrying wagons are 20 m (65 ft 7 in) long and have a metal frame that places a metal roof over the cab of the lorry (the most likely location for a fire to ignite), but the rest of the vehicle is not enclosed.

Drivers load their own lorries onto the trains, and once they are in place and secured with wheel chocks, they are taken to the club car at the front of the train by minibus. The club car offers free Wi-Fi, toilets and vending machines with drinks and snacks. During the crossing, once determined by officials, customs status (either cleared or further checks required) is displayed on screen inside the Club Cars. At the end of the journey, drivers are taken back to their vehicle so they can drive off the train to continue their journey.

=== Locomotives ===
LeShuttle operates a fleet of 58 Class 9 electric locomotives, built by Brush Traction and ABB, and later rebuilt by Brush and Bombardier. The Class 9 locomotives are among the most powerful in Europe, with most units rated at 7 megawatts (9,400 hp) and the remainder at 5.6 MW (7,500 hp). Each locomotive is capable of hauling an entire shuttle on its own in the event of a failure of its counterpart.

All shuttle trains are operated with two locomotives, one at each end, both of which are staffed. This configuration allows the train to be driven from either end in case it must reverse direction due to an obstruction in the tunnel. In the event of a total power failure, another train equipped with two operational locomotives has sufficient power to haul both its own load and the disabled train through the tunnel.

Each Class 9 locomotive is approximately 22 metres (72 ft) long and fitted with three bogies, each having two powered axles, providing high traction. The locomotives have a top speed of 160 kilometres per hour (99 mph). The use of two locomotives per train is required both by safety regulations and by the operational characteristics of the service—train lengths of up to 800 metres (2,600 ft), loads reaching 2,500 tonnes (5,500,000 lb), and the 16 kilometres (9.9 mi) of continuous slope at 1.1% on the English side of the tunnel.

In addition to the electric fleet, Getlink maintains ten Class 0001 diesel locomotives for rescue operations and for hauling maintenance and service trains.

== Control centres ==
Rail and road traffic control centres are operated 24/7.

The overall management of the Channel Tunnel transport system is carried out from a railway control centre, the RCC. There are two control centres, one at each terminal, and each is capable of taking control of the system. The RCC manages all rail traffic (shuttles and trains) circulating on the Channel Tunnel infrastructure, including in the terminal areas.

The system consists of two parts, RTM (Rail Traffic Management) manages all rail traffic in the tunnels and in the terminal areas, and the EMS (Engineering Management System), which manages fixed equipment such as ventilation, lighting, feeding electricity to the catenary wires.

The Road Traffic Control Centres (TCC) are responsible for managing the movement of vehicles for Passenger and Freight services as they circulate around each terminal, presenting tolls, moving through border controls, boarding trains and exiting trains onto motorways (the A16 in France and M20 in the UK).

== Safety ==
Eurotunnel has been criticised for failing to implement measures to prevent or extinguish fires in the open-framed large-goods-vehicle-carrying wagons; recommendations made by the Fire Brigade Union in 1996 following a fire in the Channel Tunnel – that closed wagons should be used to prevent the spread of fire – were not acted upon.

Newer safety regulations have been tightened and relaxed. For one, trains are no longer required to have a locomotive at each end, just a driving cab at each end, as a rescue locomotive could assist a stricken train and the train does not need to split into sections. On the other hand, to stop the spread of fires, the formerly full lattice steel freight shuttle wagons now only cover the cab, and checks are carried out at each end of the tunnel to stop the risk of another fire happening in the future.
