= PARAFE =

Passport verification system in France

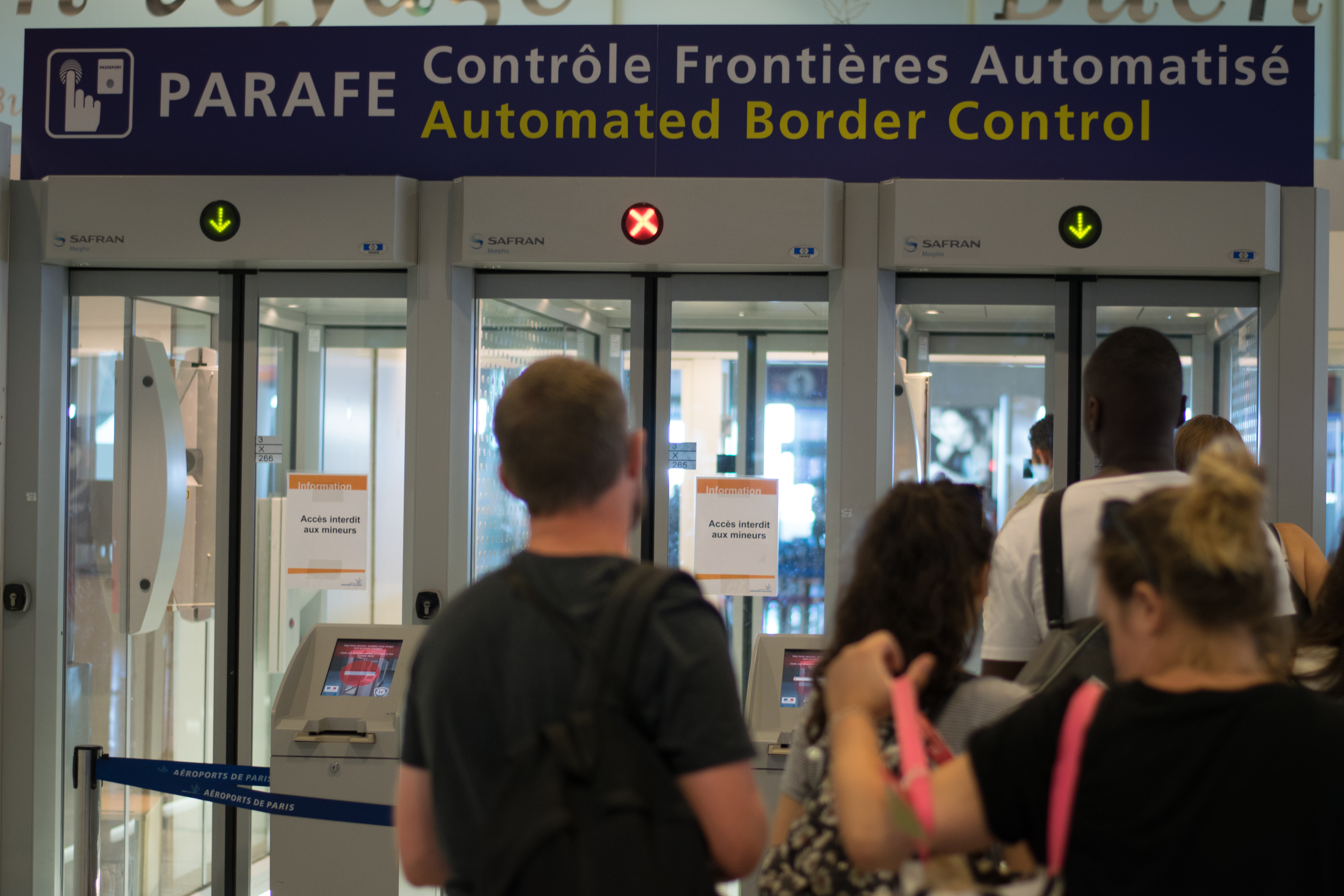
PARAFE self-service gates at Paris Charles de Gaulle Airport.

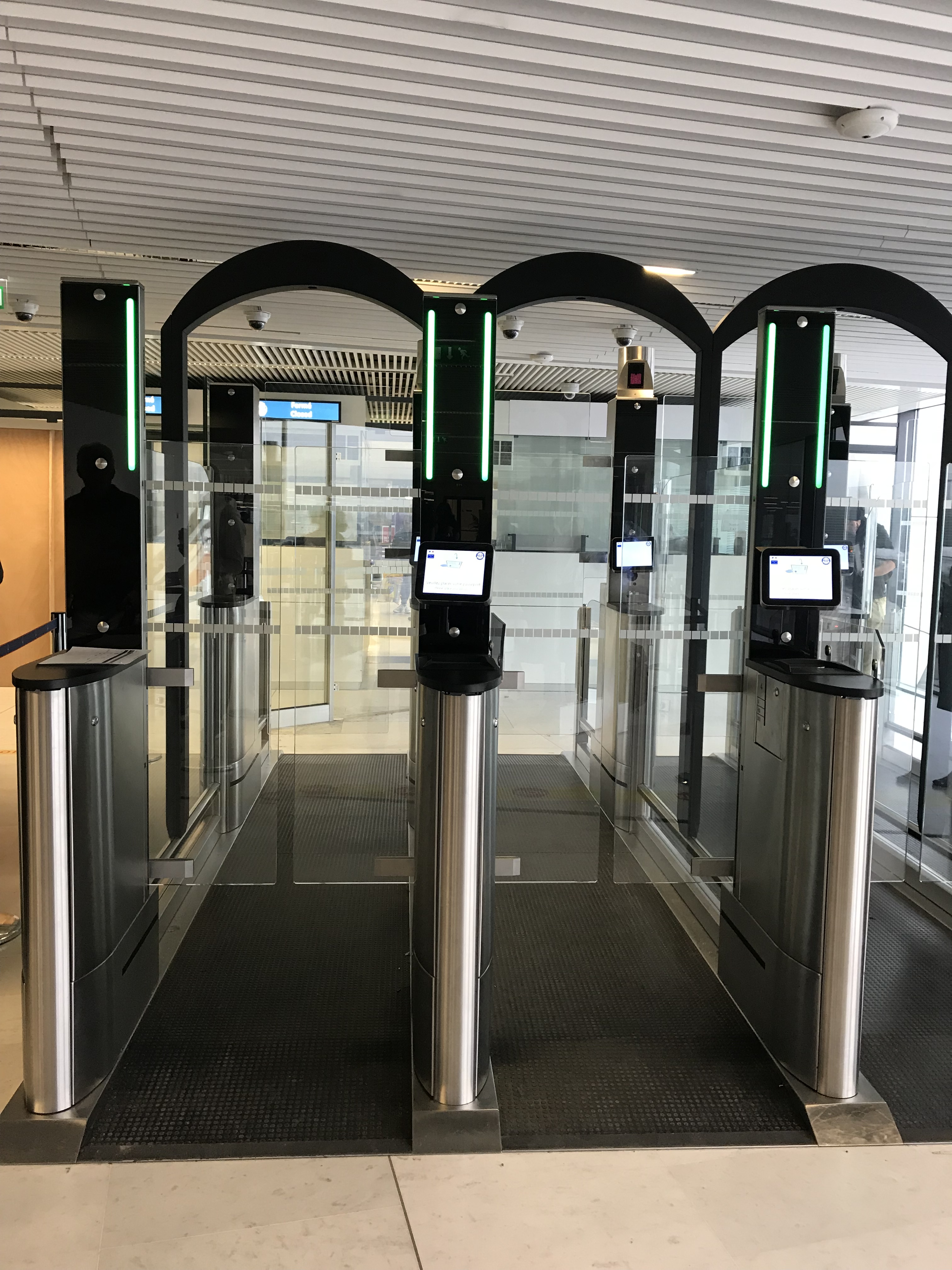
PARAFE self-service gates at Paris Charles de Gaulle Airport.

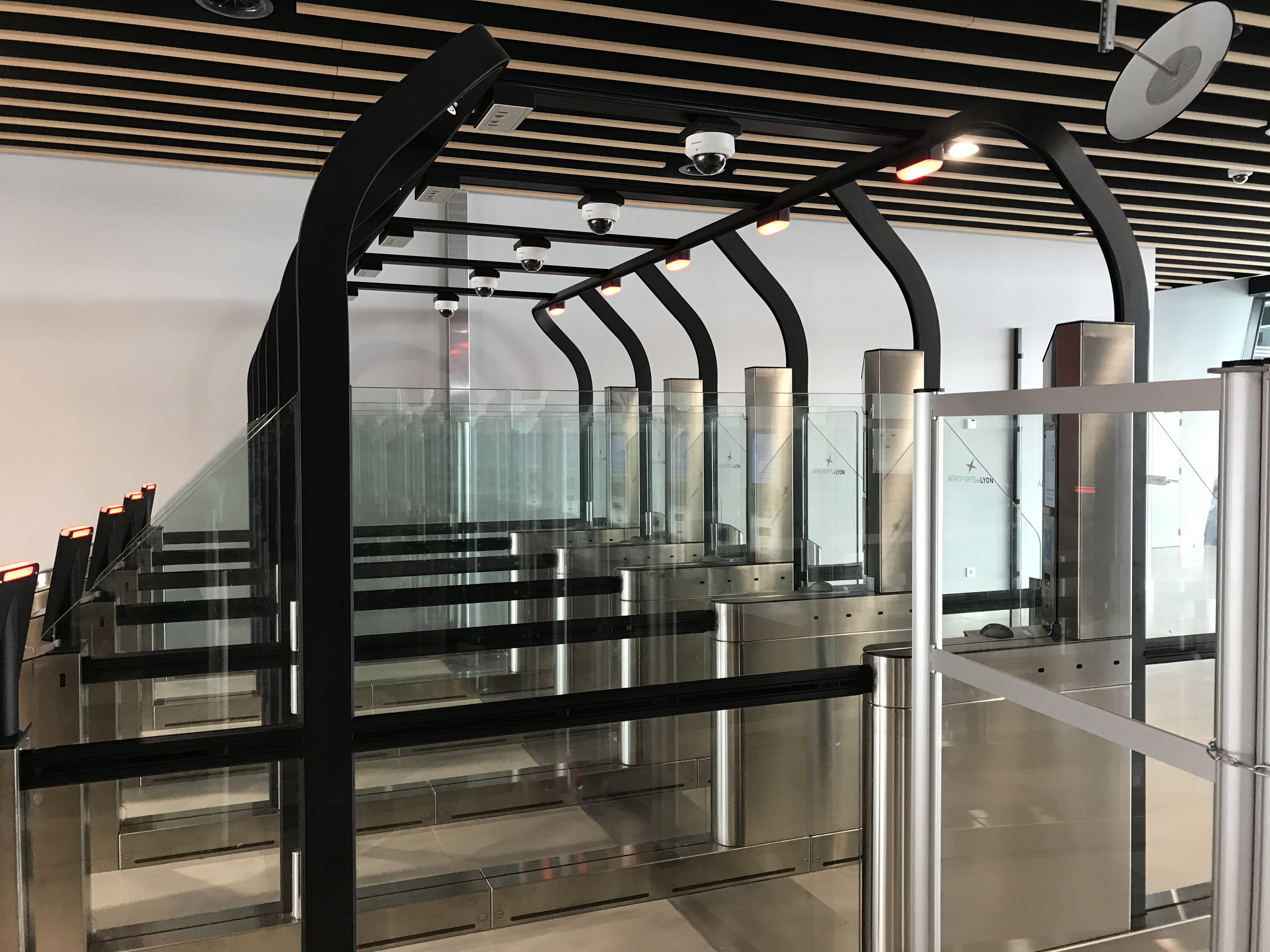
PARAFE self-service gates at Lyon–Saint-Exupéry Airport.

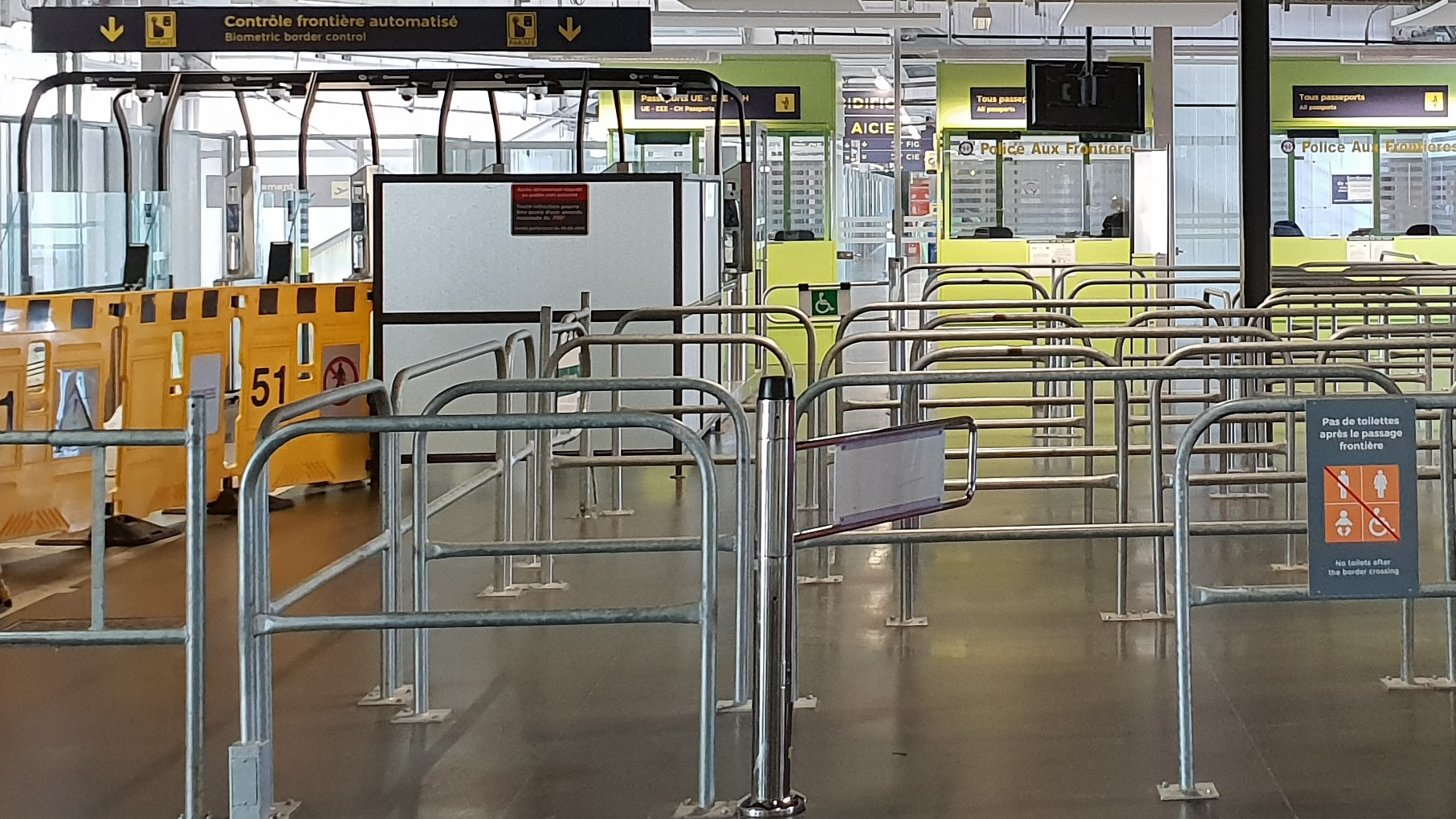
Border control at Marseille Provence Airport (with PARAFE self-service gates under construction on the left).

PARAFE (abbreviation of Passage Automatisé Rapide Aux Frontières Extérieures or automated fast-track crossing at external borders) is a passport verification and border control system deployed in France and operated by French border guards. PARAFE consists of automated self-service gates, located at certain French border checkpoints (in arrival and departure halls) and offer a faster alternative to manual checks at desks staffed by border guards. The gates use facial recognition technology to verify the user's identity against the data stored in the chip in their biometric passport.

PARAFE gates are available for travels from or to countries which are not signatory of the Schengen agreements.

== Eligibility ==
=== Eligibility for entry and exit ===
At present, citizens of the following countries can use the PARAFE gates for both entering and exiting the Schengen area, provided that they are aged 18 years or over and hold valid biometric passports.

- Andorra
- Argentina
- Australia
- Chile
- Canada
- (Europe) EU/EEA
- Israel
- Japan
- Mexico
- Monaco
- New Zealand
- Peru
- San Marino
- Singapore
- South Korea
- Switzerland
- United Kingdom
- United States

Prior to 30 March 2019, only EU/EEA and Swiss biometric passport holders could use the PARAFE gates. On 30 March 2019, eligibility was extended to Andorran, Monegasque and San Marinese biometric passport holders. On 31 December 2020, eligibility was further extended to Australian, Canadian, Japanese, New Zealand, Singaporean, South Korean and United States biometric passport holders, and continued for British passport holders after the end of the Brexit transition period.

On 30 June 2023, eligibility was further extended to Argentine, Chilean, Mexican, Israeli and Peruvian biometric passport holders.

=== Eligibility for entry only (minors) ===
Minors aged 12–17 who hold a valid biometric passport from the above table are also eligible to use the gates on arrival into Schengen territory, but not on departure because the French authorities have strict rules about unaccompanied minors leaving the country.

=== Eligibility for exit only ===
On 30 June 2023, eligibility on exit of the Schengen area was extended to all adults (aged 18 years or over), without condition of citizenship. Travellers remain subjected to the possession of a valid biometric passport. As of July 2023, this means passport holders from the following countries can use PARAFE:

- Albania
- Algeria
- Azerbaijan
- (The Bahamas) Bahamas
- Barbados
- Benin
- Bosnia and Herzegovina
- Brazil
- Cameroon
- China
- (Timor-Leste) East Timor
- Ecuador
- (Georgia (country)) Georgia
- Ivory Coast
- Kazakhstan
- Kuwait
- Lebanon
- Malaysia
- Maldives
- Morocco
- Moldova
- Montenegro
- North Macedonia
- Nepal
- Oman
- Panama
- Paraguay
- Philippines
- Qatar
- Russia
- Rwanda
- Saint Vincent and the Grenadines
- Saint Kitts and Nevis
- Serbia
- Taiwan
- Tajikistan
- Tanzania
- Thailand
- Turkmenistan
- Turkey
- United Arab Emirates
- Uganda
- Ukraine
- Uruguay
- Uzbekistan
- (Vatican City) Vatican
- Zimbabwe

=== Optional nature ===
The PARAFE system is not mandatory. Travellers can choose to have their travel documents manually checked by a border guard at the checkpoint.

== Operation ==
To use the PARAFE gates, the traveller must have a biometric passport from one of the eligible countries (these ePassports have the biometric logo on the front cover). A computer in the gate scanner reads all the information contained in the chip inside the passport, while a camera takes a picture of the passenger from which biometric patterns are verified against those from the picture saved in the passport chip. The ePassport gate scanner reads all the information contained in the chip inside the passport and runs the data against numerous databases to determine if the traveller is a security risk, while a camera takes a picture of the traveller and an officer at a control station behind the gates checks that the image captured by the camera matches the one on the passport (facial recognition). Once the data verification and facial recognition process is complete, doors will automatically either open, signifying that the traveller is permitted to enter and/or exit the country, or remain closed and a stop icon illuminate, demonstrating that the traveller has failed the security checks and will personally meet with immigration officials.

== Availability ==
At present, PARAFE Gates are available at the following locations:

- Paris Charles de Gaulle Airport
- Paris Orly Airport
- Bordeaux–Mérignac Airport
- EuroAirport Basel Mulhouse Freiburg
- Marseille Provence Airport
- Lyon–Saint-Exupéry Airport
- Nice Airport
- Eurostar Paris Gare du Nord Terminal
- Eurostar London St Pancras Terminal (juxtaposed controls)
- Eurotunnel Folkestone Terminal (juxtaposed controls)
- Eurotunnel Calais Terminal
- Port of Calais

== History ==
The previous generation of the PARAFE eGates used fingerprint technology verify the identity of the passenger and was first introduced in 2010. This was phased out since it was considered "insufficiently intuitive" (which hand, which finger), a slower process and non-French citizens had to actively sign up at a French airport every 5 years to be able to use the eGates.

The first eGates were replaced in early 2017 for a pilot project of the facial recognition technology, which was extended to more airports and St Pancras station throughout the rest of 2017 and 2018.

== See also ==
- ePassport Gates - a similar system operated in the United Kingdom
- SmartGate - a similar system operated in Australia
- European Automated Border Control systems
