= Juxtaposed controls =

Joint immigration checks

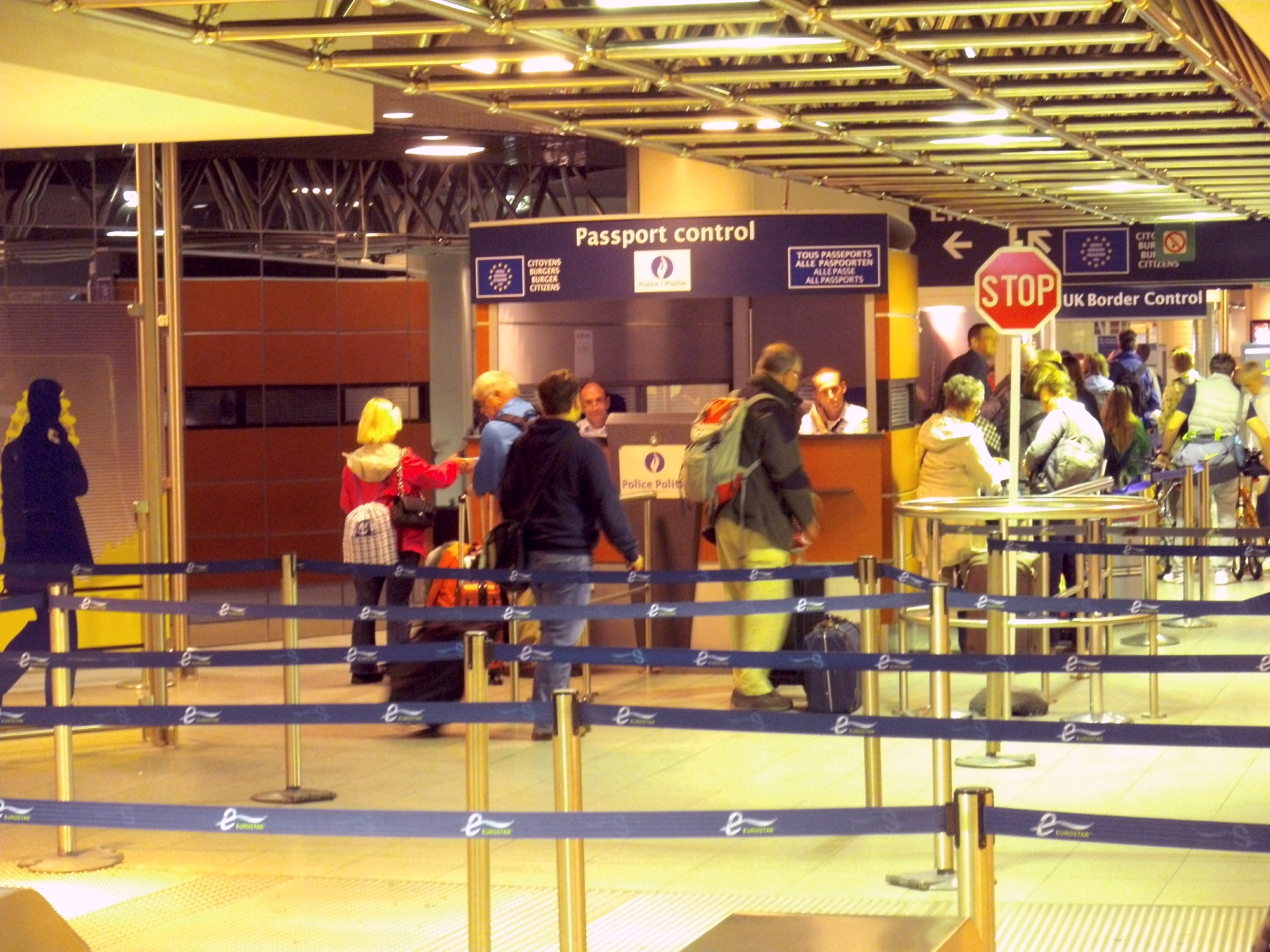
Juxtaposed immigration controls at Brussels-South railway station, with the Belgian Federal Police carrying out exit immigration checks from the Schengen Area in front, and the UK Border Force carrying UK entry immigration checks behind

Juxtaposed controls (in French: bureaux à contrôles nationaux juxtaposés, or "BCNJ"; in Dutch: kantoren waar de nationale controles van beide landen naast elkaar geschieden) are a reciprocal arrangement between Belgium, France, the Netherlands and the United Kingdom whereby border controls on certain cross-Channel routes take place before boarding the train or ferry, rather than upon arrival after disembarkation. With the exception of the Eurotunnel Shuttle route, customs checks remain unaffected by juxtaposed immigration controls and continue to take place upon arrival after disembarkation. Belgium, France and the Netherlands are all member states of the European Union and part of the border-free Schengen Area. The United Kingdom, on the other hand, has never participated in the Schengen Area, even when it was a member state of the European Union. As a result, juxtaposed controls aim to increase the convenience and efficiency of border checks when travelling by train or ferry between the Schengen Area and the UK by removing the need for immigration checks on arrival and by streamlining checks on departure. At the same time, juxtaposed controls are intended to detect and prevent illegal immigration. In 2016, there were over 56,000 instances when people were refused entry to the UK at the juxtaposed controls.

== Rail ==
=== Eurotunnel Shuttle ===
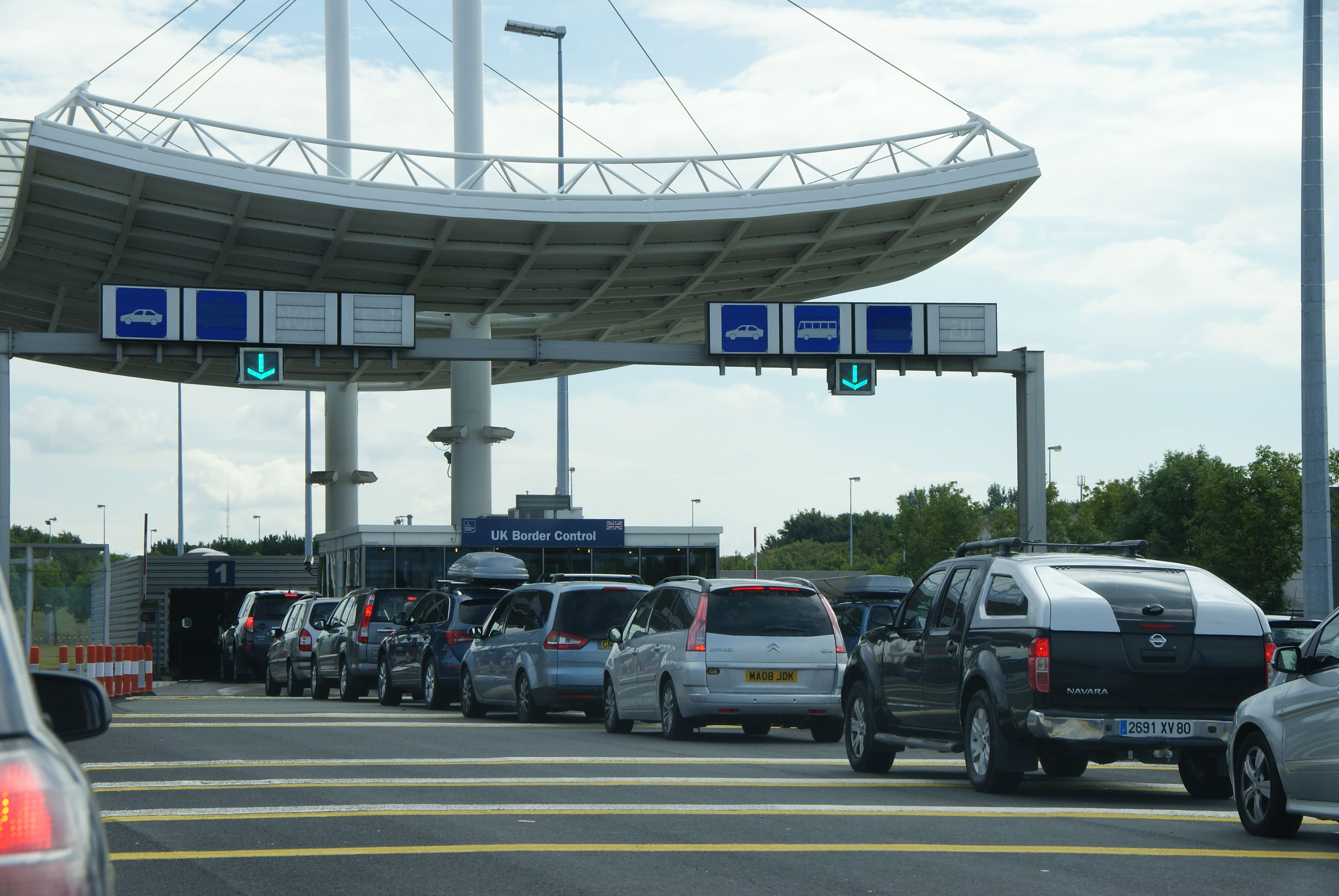
UK Border Force checkpoint at the Eurotunnel Calais Terminal, where entry checks are carried out before boarding the train to the UK

In 1991, the Sangatte Protocol was signed between France and the UK, an agreement that provided for border checkpoints to be set up by France at the Eurotunnel Folkestone Terminal in Cheriton, Kent and for border checkpoints to be set up by the UK at the Eurotunnel Calais Terminal in Coquelles, France. The Sangatte Protocol is more formally known as the Protocol between the government of the United Kingdom of Great Britain and Northern Ireland and the government of the French Republic concerning frontier controls and policing, co-operation in criminal justice, public safety and mutual assistance relating to the Channel fixed link. The Sangatte Protocol was brought into effect in France by Decree No. 93-1136 of 24 September 1993 and in the UK by the Channel Tunnel (International Arrangements) Order 1993.

As a result of the Sangatte Protocol, starting from 1994, when travelling from the UK to France by Eurotunnel Shuttle (road vehicle trains), French immigration and customs checks both take place before departing from the Eurotunnel Folkestone Terminal, rather than on arrival in France. French Border Police and Customs officers have the power to carry firearms and to arrest and detain individuals in the control zone. The UK Border Force does not carry out routine exit checks. Instead, Eurotunnel collects passengers' travel document information during the booking or check-in process, which it sends electronically to the UK Border Force. When travelling from France to the UK by Eurotunnel Shuttle, travellers have to clear both French exit checks and UK entry immigration and customs checks at the Eurotunnel Calais Terminal before boarding the train. UK Border Force officers have the power to arrest and detain individuals in the control zone.

PARAFE self-service gates are available which eligible passengers (EU, EEA, Andorran, Monegasque, San Marinese and Swiss citizens holding biometric passports) can use instead of a staffed counter to clear French entry immigration checks at the Eurotunnel Folkestone Terminal and French exit immigration checks at the Eurotunnel Calais Terminal.

Unlike the juxtaposed controls for the Eurostar and ferry which only consist of immigration pre-embarkation checks, juxtaposed controls for the Eurotunnel Shuttle consist of both immigration and customs pre-embarkation checks.

In 2002–2003, at the UK immigration checkpoint at the Eurotunnel Calais Terminal in France, 2,232 people were refused entry into the UK.

In November 2019, Her Majesty's Chief Inspector of Prisons, Peter Clarke, carried out an unannounced inspection of the UK's two short-term holding facilities (STHF) at the Eurotunnel Calais Terminal in France, both of which are managed by private contractor Mitie. The Chief Inspector observed "weak safeguarding practices for children" and had "serious concerns about adult safeguarding practice" by the UK Border Force. The Chief Inspector also raised concerns about the routine practice of detaining people in escort vehicles while awaiting the arrival of the French Border Police. He noted that few of the detainees were interviewed (regardless of their age) and their bio-data were rarely taken. Detainees refused entry to the UK would be transferred to the French Border Police, who would then release them outside the terminal area.

=== Eurostar ===
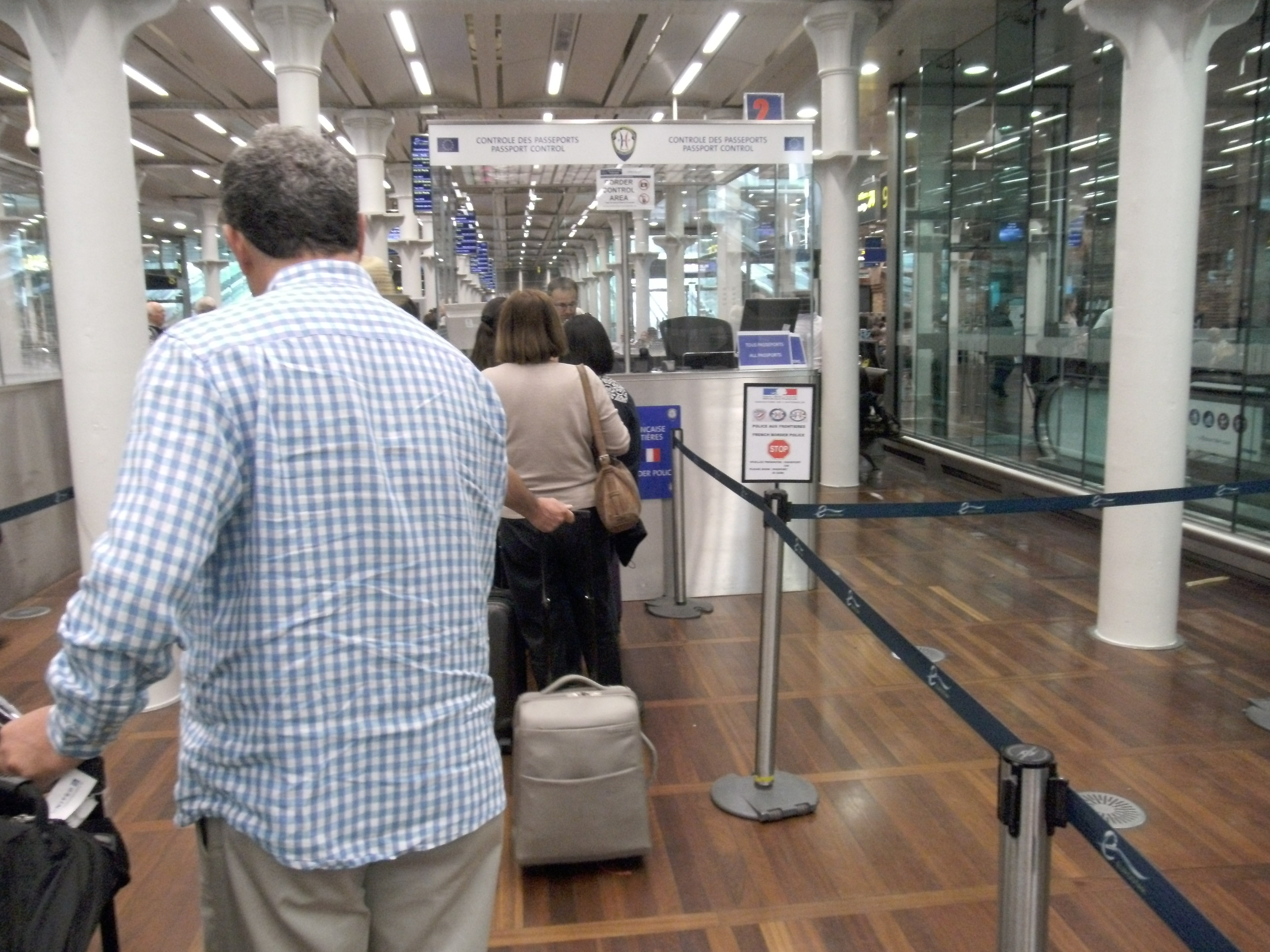
French Border Police checkpoint at London St Pancras International station, where entry immigration checks to the Schengen Area are carried out before boarding the train

On 15 December 1993, a tripartite agreement was signed by Belgium, France and the UK. This agreement allowed Belgian officials to carry out pre-embarkation immigration controls at London Waterloo International station and British officials to carry out pre-embarkation immigration controls at Brussels-Midi station for passengers travelling on direct Eurostar train services between London and Brussels. The tripartite agreement was subsequently brought into effect in the UK by the Channel Tunnel (Miscellaneous Provisions) Order 1994, in France by Law No. 94-403 of 20 May 1994 and Decree No. 98-172 of 10 March 1998, and in Belgium by the Law of 29 August 1997.

However, the pre-embarkation immigration controls arrangement did not initially apply to Eurostar trains operating between the UK and France. Initially, French Border Police officers checked passengers' travel documents while on board the train before arriving in or after departing from their station in France. No customs checks were carried out on board the train. Starting from June 1998, the French Border Police set up control booths at Paris Gare du Nord, Lille-Europe and Calais-Fréthun stations. This led to a gradual phasing out of onboard immigration checks (in 1998, 3,638 onboard checks were carried out, whereas in 2000, only 642 onboard checks were carried out). At Calais-Fréthun station, passengers were routinely checked both on arrival and on departure. However, at Paris Gare du Nord and Lille-Europe stations, passengers were only checked on departure and not on arrival. Due to the design of the arrival train platforms at Lille-Europe station, the French Border Police could only stop and check around 11% of the alighting passengers arriving from London.

On 29 May 2000, the 'Additional Protocol to the Sangatte Protocol' was signed between France and the UK, an agreement that provided for immigration checkpoints to be set up by France in Eurostar stations in the UK and for immigration checkpoints to be set up by the UK in Eurostar stations in France. The UK was eager to conclude the agreement with France because, for several years, many Eurostar passengers arrived in the UK without adequate documentation and a significant number claimed asylum on arrival. As an illustration, in the second half of 2000, around 4,000 passengers arrived at London Waterloo without the correct documentation. Furthermore, under French law, there was no liability for SNCF, the French railway company, to check the travel documents of Eurostar passengers (in fact, it was illegal under French law for SNCF to carry out documentation checks), which meant that the Eurostar was an easier way for illegal immigrants to travel from France to the UK than other means of transport (for example, in contrast, an airline carrier would be fined a £2,000 penalty for every passenger without adequate documentation who is brought to the UK, which encouraged airlines to check the travel documents of passengers more carefully). The Additional Protocol was subsequently brought into effect in France by Law No. 2001-409 of 11 May 2001 and in the UK by the Channel Tunnel (International Arrangements) (Amendment No. 3) Order 2001.

On 1 October 2004, an Administrative Arrangement was signed by Belgium, France and the UK to extend juxtaposed controls to Eurostar services between London and Brussels which make a stop in Lille. This was subsequently brought into effect in the UK by the Channel Tunnel (Miscellaneous Provisions) (Amendment) Order 2004.

As a result of the agreements, when travelling from the UK to Belgium or France by Eurostar, immigration entry checks into the Schengen Area take place before boarding the train in the UK, rather than on arrival in Belgium or France. The Schengen immigration entry checks are carried out in the UK stations before embarkation by the French Border Police (which also carries out immigration entry checks on behalf of the Belgian Federal Police for passengers travelling to Belgium). PARAFE self-service gates are available at London St Pancras International station which eligible passengers (EU, EEA, UK, Andorran, Monegasque, San Marinese and Swiss citizens holding biometric passports) can use to clear French immigration checks (instead of using a staffed counter). UK Border Force officers do not carry out routine exit checks. Instead, starting from April 2015, Eurostar security staff scan passengers' travel documents when entering the departure area of the station and send the information (the passenger's full name, nationality, date of birth, gender and travel document number, type and country of issue) electronically to the UK Border Force.

When travelling from Belgium, the Netherlands or France to the UK by Eurostar, passengers clear immigration exit checks from the Schengen Area, as well as UK immigration entry checks conducted by the UK Border Force, before boarding the train. When departing from Paris Gare du Nord, eligible passengers (EU, EEA, UK, Andorran, Monegasque, San Marinese and Swiss citizens aged 18 or older and holding biometric passports) can use PARAFE self-service gates to clear immigration exit checks from the Schengen Area (instead of using a staffed counter). ePassport gates have been installed by the UK Border Force at both Paris Gare du Nord and Brussels-Midi, which eligible passengers (UK, EU, EEA, Swiss, Australian, Canadian, Japanese, New Zealand, Singaporean, South Korean and United States citizens (as well as other foreign nationals who have enrolled in the Registered Traveller scheme) aged 12 or over holding biometric passports) can use to clear UK entry immigration instead of using a staffed counter.

Customs checks on Eurostar passengers remain unaffected by the agreements, and continue to take place upon arrival after leaving the train.

Between 2002 and 2003, 2,442 passengers were refused entry into the UK at the UK immigration checkpoints in Paris Gare du Nord and Lille-Europe stations on the basis that they had inadequate documentation. At Calais-Fréthun station, 56 passengers were refused entry into the UK at the UK immigration checkpoint there.

On 4 February 2020, the UK Transport Secretary, Grant Shapps, announced that passengers travelling on Eurostar from Amsterdam and Rotterdam to London would no longer have to disembark at Brussels-Midi station, go through immigration checks and then board another train before continuing their journey to London. According to the announcement, starting from 30 April 2020, passengers would go through juxtaposed controls in Amsterdam Centraal station before boarding the train, and starting from 18 May 2020, passengers would go through juxtaposed controls in Rotterdam Centraal station before boarding the train. However, the inauguration of juxtaposed controls in Amsterdam Centraal and Rotterdam Centraal was postponed due to the COVID-19 pandemic. Direct service between London, Rotterdam and Amsterdam subsequently commenced (together with the launch of juxtaposed controls) on 26 October 2020.

The parties to the 1993 Tripartite Agreement (Belgium, France and the UK) agreed to add the Netherlands as a contracting party by entering into a new treaty (known as the 'Quadripartite Agreement'). Accordingly, on 7 July 2020, the four countries signed the 'Special Arrangement between the Governments of France, Belgium, the Netherlands and the UK concerning Security Matters relating to Trains using the Channel Fixed Link'. On 10 July 2020, the Netherlands and the UK entered into a bilateral agreement ('Agreement concerning Border Controls on Rail Traffic between the Netherlands and the United Kingdom using the Channel Fixed Link').

==== Lille loophole ====
Belgium, France and the Netherlands are all member states of the European Union and the border-free Schengen Area. The United Kingdom was, until 31 January 2020, a member state of the European Union, but did not participate in the Schengen Area. Some Eurostar services from Brussels to London made a stop in Lille/Calais. On such trains, passengers who boarded in Brussels and disembarked in Lille would be travelling within the Schengen Area, and therefore not be subject to border checks. The Belgian Federal Police did not permit UK Border Agency officers stationed at the juxtaposed controls at Brussels-Midi station to question or check the documents of passengers travelling on a ticket from Brussels to Lille or Calais. On the other hand, passengers boarding the same train in Brussels travelling on a ticket to the UK would be subject to exit checks leaving the Schengen Area and entry checks to the UK at the juxtaposed controls in Brussels-Midi station. This situation created a loophole (which was commonly referred to as the 'Lille loophole') whereby certain passengers who buy a train ticket from Brussels to Lille or Calais and therefore not go through the juxtaposed controls before boarding the train in Brussels, but would remain on the train after Lille/Calais and continue to the UK, thereby leaving the Schengen Area and entering the UK without having undergone the proper border checks. A number of passengers were able to travel to the UK and claim asylum on arrival in the UK using this method.

After this loophole came to light in December 2011, Eurostar initially suspended the sale of point to point Brussels to Lille/Calais tickets, while maintaining the sale of season tickets on this route. Subsequently, Eurostar resumed the sale of tickets, but restricted the sale of Brussels-Lille/Calais tickets to 3 daily services. Upon arrival at Lille, the number of Brussels-Lille tickets sold were reconciled with the total number of disembarkations. Security guards conducted ticket inspections on passengers before the trains arrived at Calais, where those without a valid ticket to the UK would be instructed to disembark. In addition to the pre-embarkation juxtaposed controls, the UK Border Force also checked the travel documents of passengers travelling on these 3 services on arrival at London St Pancras International station.

In December 2013, Belgium and the UK signed an agreement clarifying that at the juxtaposed controls in Brussels-Midi station, 'Immigration controls performed by the United Kingdom are only permitted on passengers whose travel destination is stated to be within the United Kingdom'. Further, 'Where a person who on Belgium territory boarded an international train using the Fixed Link and has arrived in the United Kingdom is refused entry, having been found to have avoided United Kingdom immigration controls on Belgian territory by stating that their final destination is intra-Schengen, the authorities of Belgium may not refuse to accept such a person for readmittance'. The agreement entered into force on 1 October 2016.

In order to close this loophole, passengers travelling from Brussels to Lille or Calais go through a different departure area in Brussels-Midi station (bypassing the juxtaposed controls for passengers heading to the UK) and travel in a separate designated carriage (available in standard class only) controlled by security guards, who ensure that all of these passengers disembark at Lille/Calais before the train goes on to the UK. Until 30 January 2017, regular commuters holding a season ticket were exempt from this measure due to the high number of travellers on peak-hour services. After this exemption was removed, regular commuters complained that only one carriage (with 48 seats and standing capacity for 20 people) was allocated for passengers from Brussels to Lille on the peak hour train service departing from Brussels at 17:56.

=== List of railway stations with juxtaposed controls ===
==== In Belgium ====
- Brussels-South railway station

==== In France ====
- Bourg-Saint-Maurice
- Calais–Fréthun (suspended since March 2020)
- Eurotunnel Calais Terminal
- Lille Europe
- Moûtiers–Salins–Brides-les-Bains
- Paris Gare du Nord

Avignon-Centre also had facilities between 2002 and 2014

==== In the Netherlands ====
- Amsterdam Centraal
- Rotterdam Centraal

==== In the United Kingdom ====
- Eurotunnel Folkestone Terminal
- Ashford International (suspended since March 2020)
- Ebbsfleet International (suspended since March 2020)
- St Pancras International

Waterloo International also had facilities between 1994 and 2007

== Ferry ==
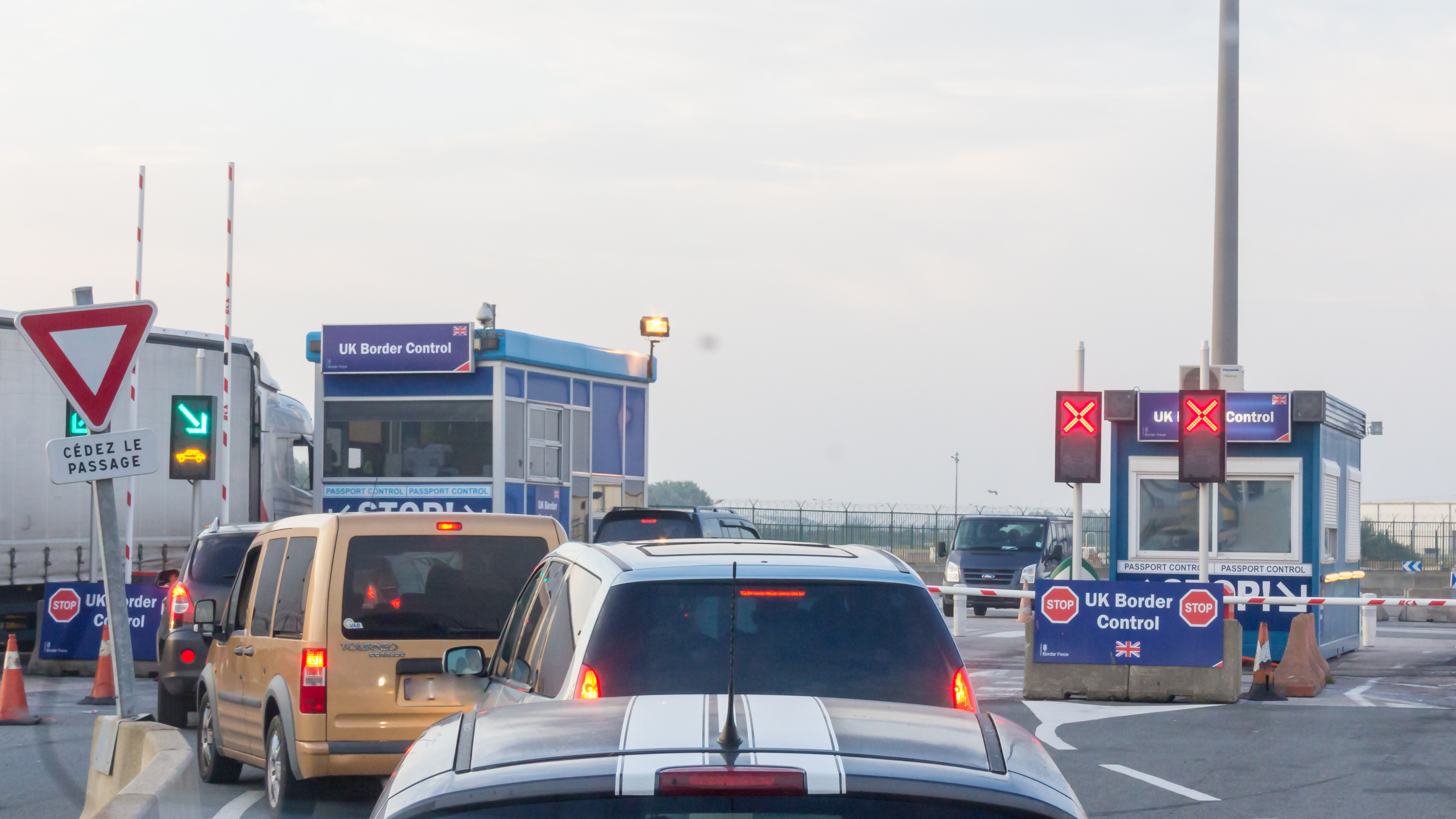
UK Border Force checkpoint in the Port of Dunkirk, where immigration checks are carried out before boarding the ferry to Dover

On 4 February 2003, France and the UK concluded the Treaty of Le Touquet (formally known as the Treaty between the Government of the United Kingdom and the Government of the French Republic concerning the implementation of frontier controls at sea ports of both countries on the Channel and North Sea). This agreement provided for juxtaposed controls on a number of cross-Channel ferry routes. The Treaty was subsequently put into effect in France by Law No. 2003-1368 of 31 December 2003 and in the UK by the Nationality, Immigration and Asylum Act 2002 (Juxtaposed Controls) Order 2003, under the authority of the Nationality, Immigration and Asylum Act 2002.

France has established immigration checkpoints at the Port of Dover, where the French Border Police carries out immigration entry checks into the Schengen Area on passengers travelling to Calais or Dunkirk. French Border Police officers have the power to carry firearms and to arrest and detain individuals in the immigration control zone in the Port of Dover. On the other hand, the UK Border Force does not carry out routine exit checks at the Port of Dover. Instead, since April 2015, the ferry operator collects passengers' travel document information during the booking or check-in process, which it sends electronically to the UK Border Force. However, coaches carrying organised school groups (consisting of students aged 16 and under accompanied by teachers or other responsible adults) are exempt from having their travel document information collected and sent to the UK Border Force.

At present, the UK has immigration checkpoints at the ports of Calais and Dunkirk (previously, the UK also had an immigration checkpoint at the port of Boulogne-sur-Mer). UK Border Force officers have the power to arrest and detain individuals in the immigration control zone in the ports of Calais and Dunkirk. Passengers travelling from Calais and Dunkirk to the UK go through French exit checks as well as UK immigration entry checks before embarkation.

Customs checks on ferry passengers remain unaffected by the Treaty and continue to take place upon arrival after leaving the ferry. Therefore, when travelling from France to Dover, although ferry passengers have already gone through immigration checks before departure, when they arrive in the UK, they might still be stopped by customs officers for a customs inspection. Similarly, when travelling from Dover to France, although ferry passengers have already been through immigration checks by the French Border Police at Dover, they might still be subject to a customs check by French Customs on arrival in France.

Between 2003 and 2007, 10,766 people were refused entry into the UK by UK immigration officers stationed in Calais.

A Joint Operational Coordination Centre has been created at the Port of Calais to strengthen co-operation between the UK Border Force, French Border Police and French Customs.

Since 2011, private security officers employed by Eamus Cork Solutions (ECS) work in the freight lanes at the juxtaposed controls at the Port of Calais and the Port of Dunkirk. Their job is to detect people concealed inside vehicles attempting to enter the UK through visual inspections, sniffer dogs, or by equipment including heartbeat monitors, carbon dioxide detectors and scanners.

At the UK-France Summit held at the Royal Military Academy Sandhurst on 18 January 2018, French President Emmanuel Macron and UK Prime Minister Theresa May announced that the UK would provide an additional €50 million in financial support for 2018 for France to strengthen border security (including fencing, CCTV and detection technology) at the juxtaposed controls at the Port of Calais, as well as to establish accommodation facilities located outside the Calais and Dunkirk areas, such as Reception and Assessment Centres. The two countries also agreed to a treaty (known as the Sandhurst Treaty) with provisions to implement the Dublin III Regulation concerning the treatment of unaccompanied asylum seeking children and to establish a Joint Information and Coordination Centre (in French: Centre Conjoint d’Information et de Coordination, or CCIC). The Sandhurst Treaty entered into force on 1 February 2018, and the Joint Centre became operational on 23 November 2018.

In 2019, the French Minister of the Interior, Christophe Castaner, has stated that if the juxtaposed controls were removed, it would lead to increased waiting times for travellers to clear immigration and customs on arrival.

In November 2019, Her Majesty's Chief Inspector of Prisons, Peter Clarke, carried out an unannounced inspection of the UK's short-term holding facility (STHF) at the Port of Calais, which is managed by private contractor Mitie. The Chief Inspector raised concerns about the routine practice of detaining people in caged escort vehicles that were in 'appalling condition, with ripped out seats' for 'prolonged periods' while awaiting the arrival of the French Border Police. Few of the detainees were interviewed and UK Border Force officers could not state the legal authority under which these detainees were held. Detainees refused entry to the UK would be handed to the French Border Police and then be released outside the port area. No onsite medical care or access to legal advice is provided in the STHF.

UK Border Force officers and Detainee Custody Officers (DCOs) employed by Mitie who work at the juxtaposed controls are either bussed in daily across the Channel from their homes in Kent, or they reside four nights a week in a hotel in Calais.

== Air ==
There are no juxtaposed controls on cross-Channel air travel. Air carriers are required under UK and Schengen rules to perform checks before boarding that passengers possess travel documents to enter the destination country. Passengers flying from the Schengen Area to the UK undergo Schengen exit checks at the departure airport and entry checks by the UK Border Force at the arrival airport in the UK. For passengers flying from the UK to the Schengen Area, the UK Border Force does not conduct routine exit checks. Instead, the air carrier takes passengers' travel document information during the check-in process, which is transmitted electronically to the UK Border Force. Passengers then go through Schengen entry immigration and customs checks on arrival in the Schengen Area.

== Implications of the United Kingdom's withdrawal from the European Union ==
The House of Lords European Union Committee has observed that the Treaty of Le Touquet led to a 'build-up of pressure in the Calais region of people who seek to come to the UK but who do not fulfil immigration requirements and are unable to seek asylum in the UK from France', and that the 'continuous establishment of unregulated camp sites for people in this position is an irritant in French politics'. As a consequence, after the result of the 2016 United Kingdom European Union membership referendum, there were increased calls in France to scrap the Treaty of Le Touquet and end juxtaposed controls, including from the then French Presidential candidates Alain Juppé and Emmanuel Macron, and from the Mayor of Calais, Natacha Bouchart. However, such calls have since receded, as political leaders in France and the UK have sought to reinforce their commitment to bilateral border cooperation (for example, by entering into the Sandhurst Treaty). At the same time, the committee has noted that although the agreements establishing juxtaposed controls are 'not formally EU-dependent, the agreements underpinning bilateral border cooperation have undoubtedly been easier to sustain under the shared umbrella of EU membership'.

On 31 January 2020, the United Kingdom ceased to be a member state of the European Union. During the transition period that ended on 31 December 2020, the arrangements for juxtaposed controls remained unchanged.

== Gallery ==
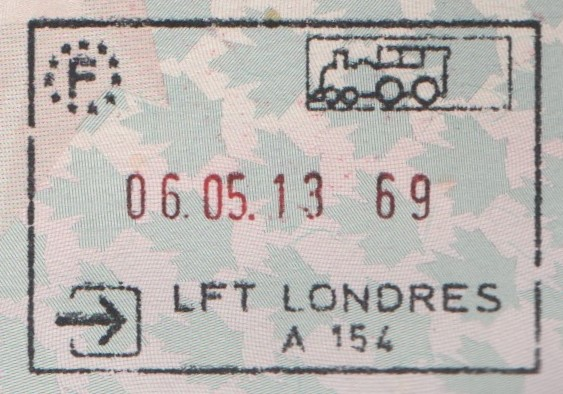
Entry stamp into the Schengen Area issued by the French Border Police at St Pancras International station. ('LFT' stands for 'Liaison fixe transmanche' (literally: cross-Channel fixed link))

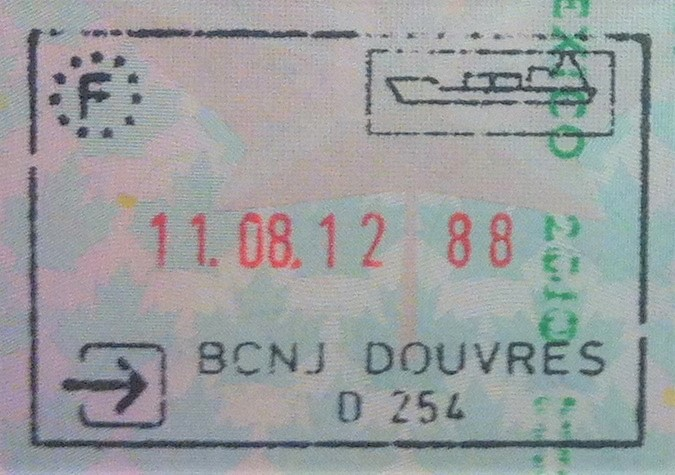
Entry stamp into the Schengen Area issued by the French Border Police at the Port of Dover. ('BCNJ' stands for 'Bureaux à contrôles nationaux juxtaposés' (literally: juxtaposed national control bureaux))

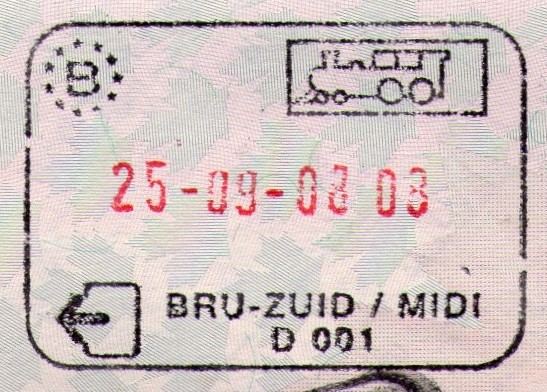
Exit stamp from the Schengen Area issued by the Belgian Federal Police at Brussels-South railway station

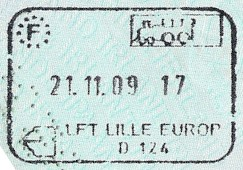
Exit stamp from the Schengen Area issued by the French Border Police at Lille-Europe station. ('LFT' stands for French: Liaison fixe transmanche (lit. 'cross-Channel fixed link').)

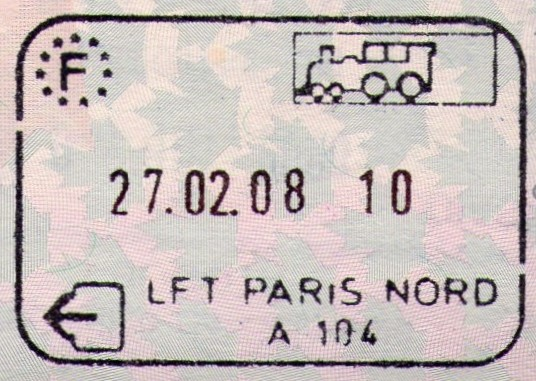
Exit stamp from the Schengen Area issued by the French Border Police at Paris Gare du Nord station. ('LFT' stands for 'Liaison fixe transmanche' (literally: cross-Channel fixed link))

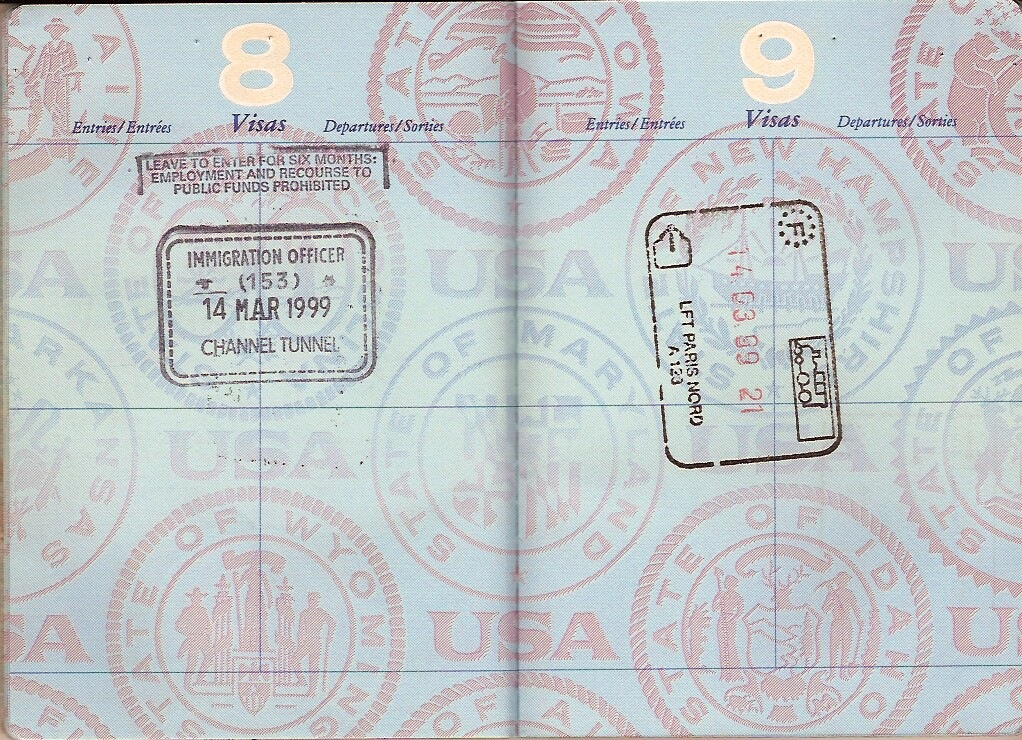
Pair of passport stamps (exit from France, entry into the UK) at the juxtaposed border controls at Paris Gare du Nord station

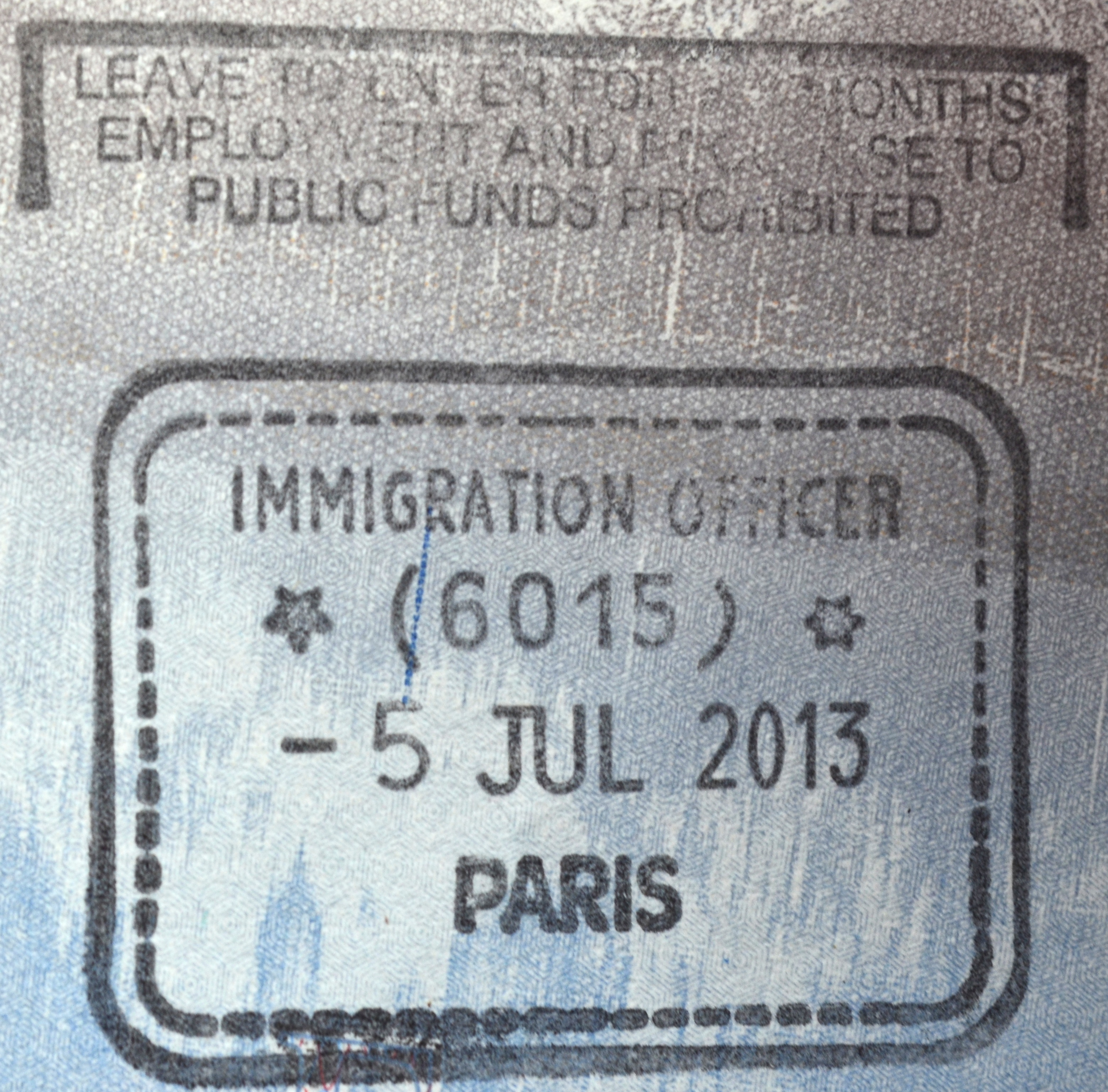
British entry stamp issued by the UK Border Force at Paris Gare du Nord station

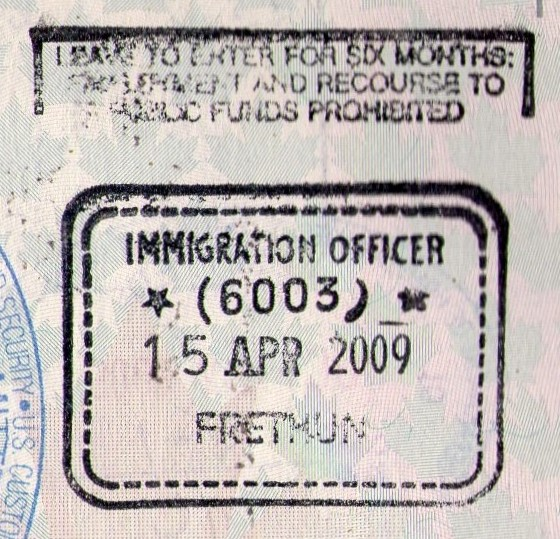
British entry stamp issued by the UK Border Agency at Calais-Fréthun station

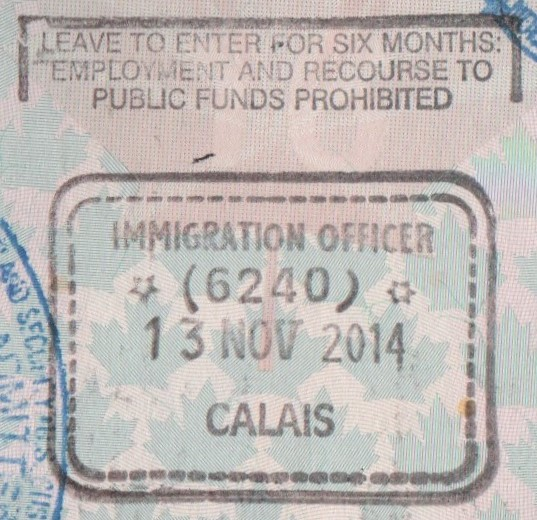
British entry stamp issued by the UK Border Force at the Port of Calais

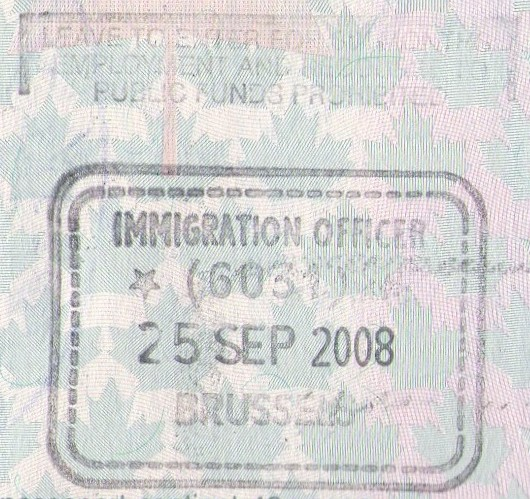
British entry stamp issued by the UK Border Agency at Brussels-Midi railway station

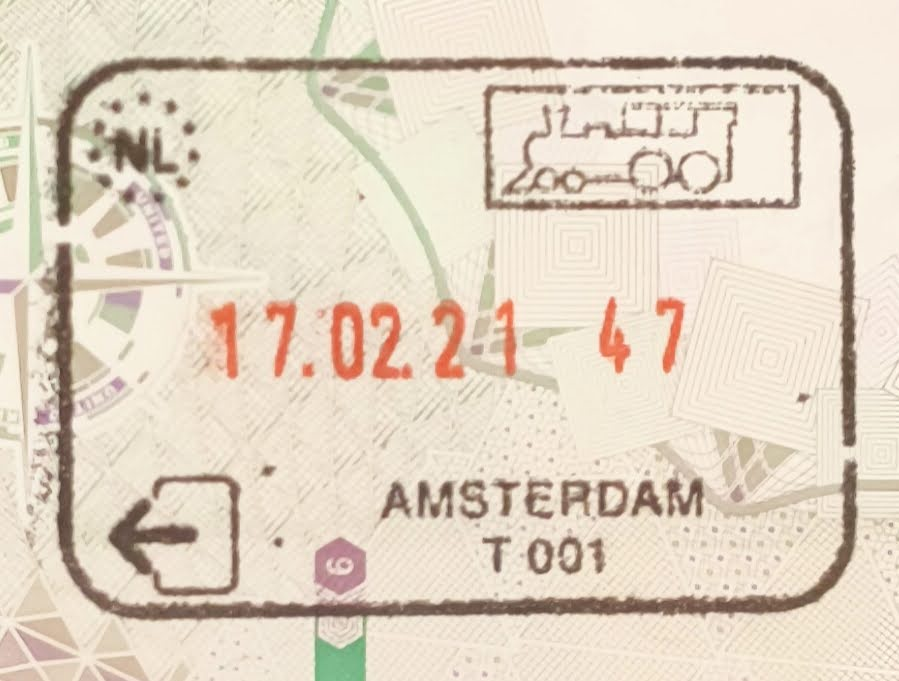
Exit stamp from the Schengen Area issued by the Koninklijke Marechaussee at Amsterdam Centraal Station

== Juxtaposed controls at other borders in other countries and regions ==
Apart from the borders along the English Channel, juxtaposed border controls or similar arrangements exist in other countries:

- France and Switzerland: Geneva Cornavin station, located entirely in Switzerland, has two platforms (7 and 8) that are designated for departures to and arrivals from France. Swiss and French border controls occur in the same building; due to both countries being in the Schengen Area, these are mostly customs checks. Trains departing from the French sector do not make any intermediate stops in Switzerland before crossing the border.
- France and The Netherlands: Princess Juliana International Airport, Sint Maarten and Grand Case-Espérance Airport, Saint Martin (where there are joint border controls pursuant to the Franco-Dutch treaty on Saint Martin border controls)
- China with its special administrative regions of Macau and Hong Kong:
  - Hong Kong West Kowloon railway station, located in Hong Kong with a Mainland Port Area where border controls to mainland China are located and mainland law (rather than Hong Kong law) applies. (bill introduced to the Legislative Council of Hong Kong in early 2018, passed on 14 June 2018)
  - Shenzhen Bay Port and Huanggang Port (a similar arrangement whereby Hong Kong carries out immigration checks at the border crossing point geographically located in the Mainland, but the area is designated as if it is part of Hong Kong and Hong Kong law fully applies)
  - Hengqin Port (a similar arrangement whereby Macau carries out immigration checks at the border crossing point geographically located in the Mainland, but the area is designated as if it is part of Macau and Macau law fully applies)
- China and Laos: There is a plan to reform the border control in the Laos-China Railway, which both CIQ facilities are housed in Mohan station.
- Malaysia and Thailand: Padang Besar railway station in Padang Besar, Malaysia which houses CIQ facilities for both Malaysia and Thailand despite being wholly within Malaysia territory.
- Singapore and Malaysia: Woodlands Train Checkpoint (a similar arrangement where passengers undergo Malaysian entry formalities at the station, despite it being located in Singaporean territory) Slated to close in 2027 and replaced by the Johor Bahru–Singapore Rapid Transit System under similar arrangements, with passengers undergoing Singaporean entry formalities at Bukit Chagar RTS station and Malaysian entry formalities at Woodlands North MRT station.
- Argentina and Uruguay: Buquebus ferries between Buenos Aires (Argentina) and Montevideo and Colonia del Sacramento (Uruguay). Uruguayan immigration and customs are cleared before boarding the ferries in Buenos Aires.
- United States border preclearance (a similar arrangement whereby the US carries out pre-embarkation immigration checks at some airports and border crossing points in Canada, the Caribbean, Ireland, and the United Arab Emirates)

== See also ==
- Migrants around Calais
- List of border crossing points in France
- France–UK border
- Belgian Federal Police
- Direction centrale de la police aux frontières (French Border Police)
- Directorate-General of Customs and Indirect Taxes (French Customs)
- Royal Marechaussee (The Netherlands)
- Border Force
- Border Control
