= Eurotunnel Folkestone Terminal =

Channel Tunnel railway terminal in Folkestone, England

Folkestone Terminal
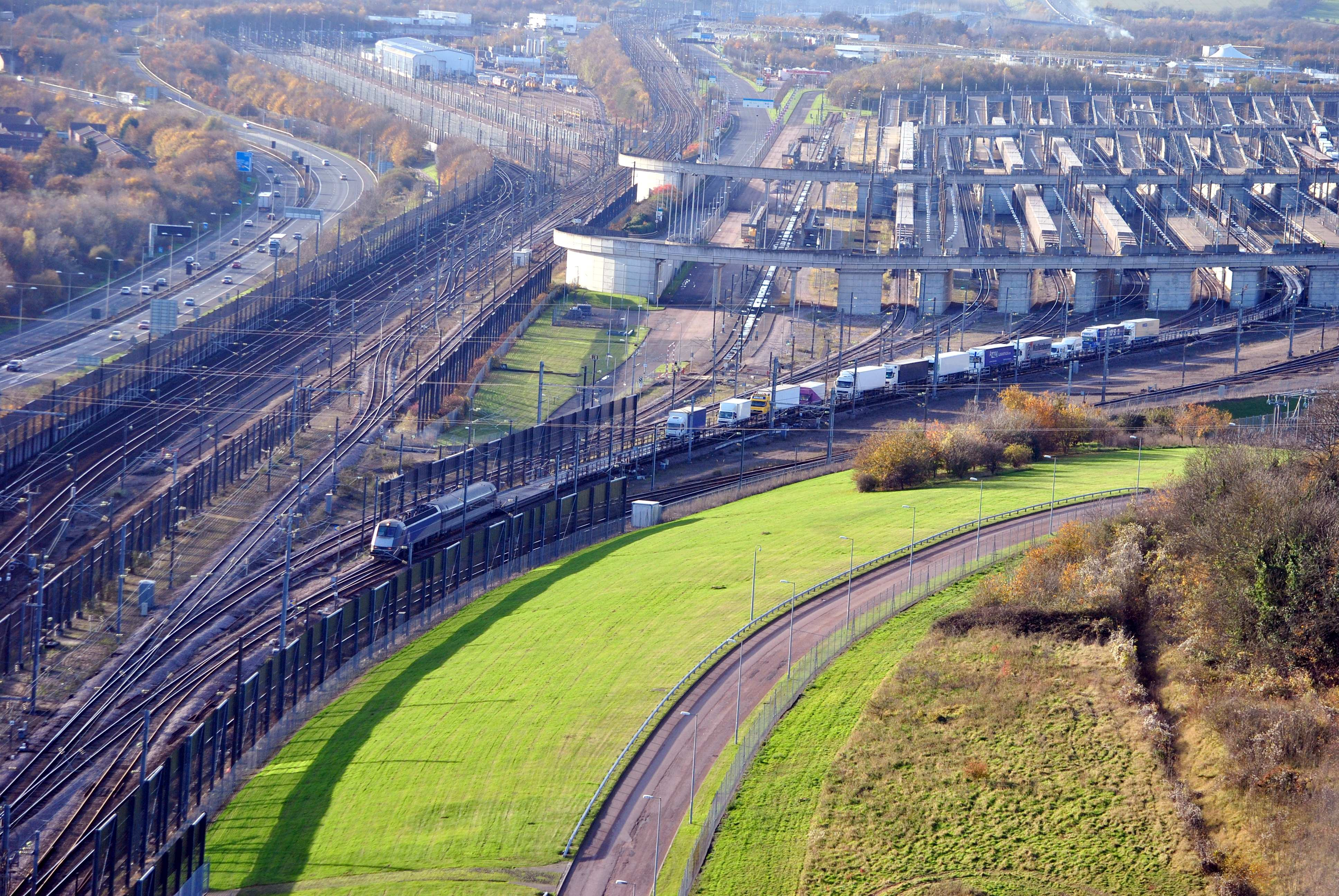
- Eurotunnel HGV Shuttle departing from Folkestone to Calais

General information
- Location: Folkestone; United Kingdom
- Coordinates: 51°05′48″N 1°08′14″E
- System: Eurotunnel Shuttle vehicle transport terminal
- Owner: Getlink
- Line: Channel Tunnel
- Platforms: 10 island platforms
- Tracks: 10

Construction
- Structure type: At-grade

History
- Opened: 6 May 1994

Services
Preceding station	Eurotunnel	Following station
Terminus	LeShuttle	Calais Terminus
Location

The Eurotunnel Folkestone Terminal is a railway terminal built for the transport of road-going vehicles on specially constructed trains through the Channel Tunnel. The station is located in Cheriton, a northern suburb of the town of Folkestone in the county of Kent. It is the terminal for the United Kingdom. On the French side is the Eurotunnel Calais Terminal located at Coquelles, near Calais. The passenger service building at the Eurotunnel Folkestone Terminal is called the Victor Hugo Terminal, named for the French author Victor Hugo.

== History ==
As part of the Channel Tunnel project, the plan for services included the use of dedicated shuttle trains that would carry both passenger and freight vehicles between Britain and France, which would compete with the cross-channel ferries. In order to accommodate these services, it was planned to build a brand new vehicle terminal on each side of the tunnel that would allow cars and lorries to be loaded quickly onto the trains. The site chosen for the British terminal was Cheriton, in Folkestone, Kent, not far from the British tunnel portal.

The site eventually came to nearly 350 acres (140 ha) in area, which was considerably smaller than the French terminal. It is bordered by both Cheriton and Newington. The hamlet of Danton Pinch was in the middle of where the terminal was to go, and so was demolished. Some ancient woodland and listed buildings were removed with care and transported elsewhere. Construction began at the same time as boring for the tunnel, which provided large amounts of soil to be used to stabilise and level the terminal site before construction of the facility was undertaken. At the same time, a pipeline was provided connecting Sandgate and Goodwin Sands for the transport of dredged sand to the site. A 6.5 kilometres (4.0 mi) pipeline was laid from Sandgate to the terminal. Dredging was by Westminster Dredging.

The major elements to be built at Cheriton were the platforms and overbridges, which connected the terminal to the M20 motorway, which was completed simultaneously with the tunnel project. The tunnel was officially opened on 6 May 1994, with services between Cheriton and Coquelles beginning in July the same year, when the first freight shuttles started running. Passenger services then started in December 1994.

As a result of the Sangatte Protocol signed between France and the UK in 1991, juxtaposed controls have been established. Travellers going from Cheriton to Coquelles clear French entry immigration and Customs checks before boarding the train in Cheriton, rather than on arrival in Coquelles.

== Infrastructure ==
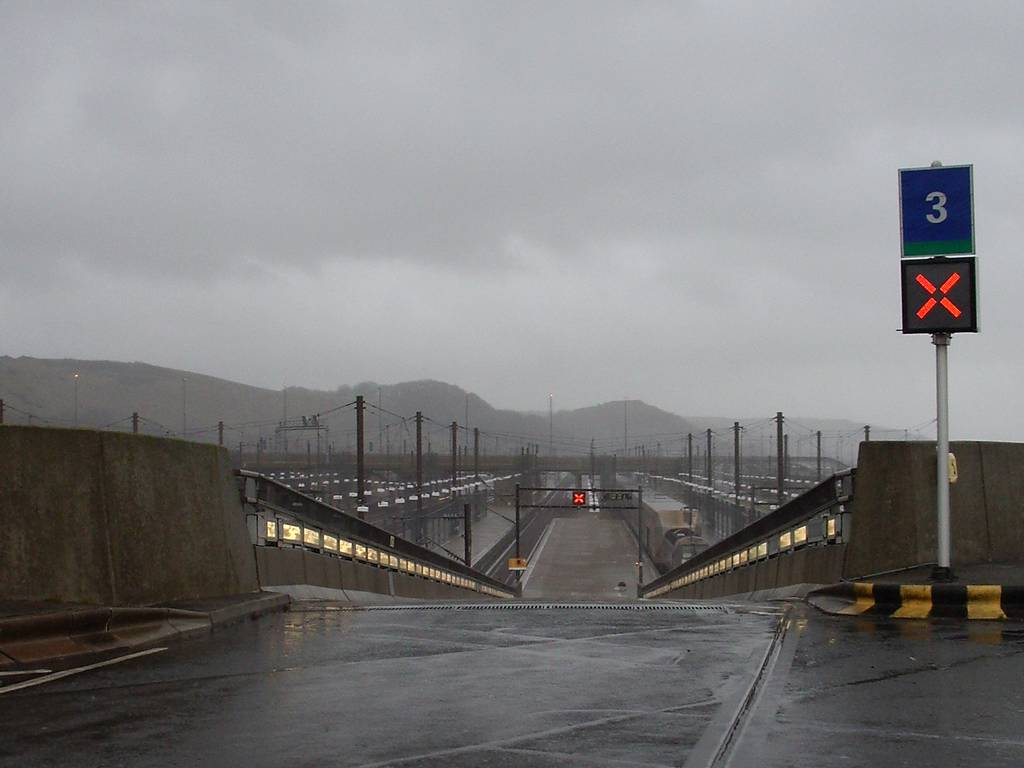
Access to platform 3.

The terminal consists of ten island platforms, which are each 800 metres (2,600 ft) in length, with four overbridges connecting them to the motorway and the terminal. The overbridges are located at approximately equidistant points along the length of the platforms so that vehicles have to drive for as little distance as possible along the platforms themselves; vehicles unloaded from the front to the middle of the train would use the furthest bridge, while those unloaded from the centre to the rear would use the next bridge in, and vice versa for those vehicles embarking. The two bridges at the western end of the platforms are intended for embarking vehicles, while those at the eastern end are for those disembarking. The island platforms are separated by single track, allowing vehicles to access the train from both sides.

The terminal is located at the end of a loop connected to the route from the tunnel; trains exiting the tunnel travel clockwise around this loop and then pull into the terminal, meaning the locomotive that pulled the train will remain at the front for the next service through the tunnel. The terminal at Coquelles also has a loop arrangement, but instead trains travel anticlockwise; this is intended to ensure equal wear on the flanges of the wheels. There was more room for a flyover on the French side to create an anticlockwise loop than at the Folkestone terminal.

The terminal has a larger loading gauge than the rest of the British network owing to the oversized trailers used to carry the road-going vehicles. As a consequence, all maintenance of the rolling stock is undertaken within the small, self-contained Channel Tunnel rail network, with the major work carried out at Coquelles (which is a much larger facility), and minor work undertaken at Cheriton. When rolling stock does need to be taken to another British location, locomotives and carriages are transported by trucks, as was done with the refurbishment of the locomotives at Brush traction in 2010/2011.

The Eurotunnel rail control centre is located within the Folkestone Terminal. All Channel Tunnel traffic is managed from here. There is a back-up centre at the Calais terminal, should it need to be used.
