= Eurotunnel Calais Terminal =

Train station served by Eurotunnel trains to the UK via the Channel Tunnel

Calais Terminal
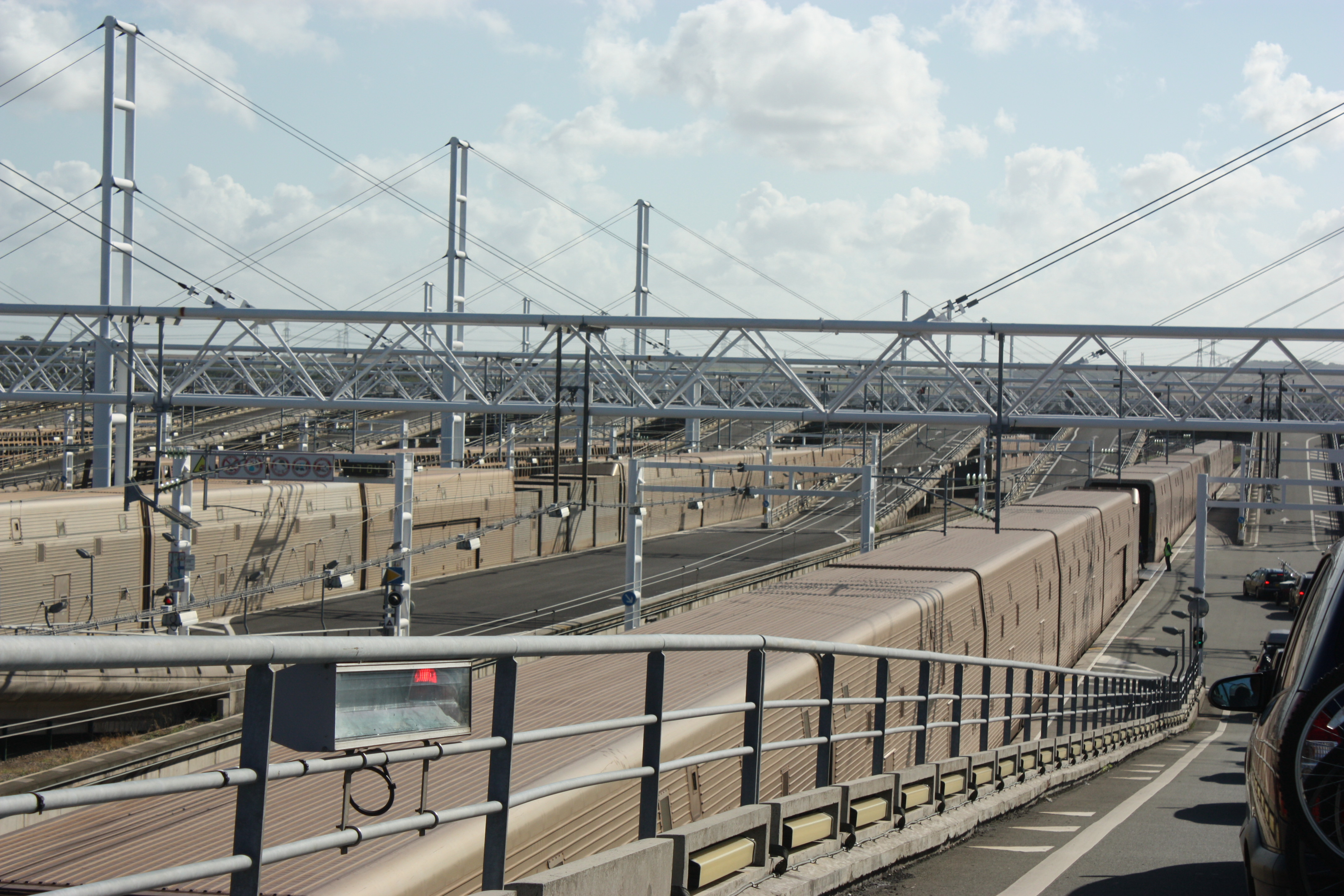
- Vehicles boarding Eurotunnel Shuttle at Calais in 2010

General information
- Location: Coquelles; France
- Coordinates: 50°55′22″N 1°48′50″E
- System: Eurotunnel Shuttle vehicle transport terminal
- Owner: Getlink
- Line: Channel Tunnel
- Platforms: 10 island platforms
- Tracks: 10

Construction
- Structure type: At-grade

History
- Opened: 6 May 1994

Services
Preceding station	Eurotunnel	Following station
Folkestone Terminus	LeShuttle	Terminus
Location

The Eurotunnel Calais Terminal is a railway terminal built for the transport of road-going vehicles on specially constructed trains through the Channel Tunnel. The station is located in the commune of Coquelles in the Pas-de-Calais department near the city of Calais. It is the terminal for the France and by extension the rest of Continental Europe. On the British side is the Eurotunnel Folkestone Terminal located at Cheriton, near Folkestone. The passenger service building at the Eurotunnel Calais Terminal is called the Charles Dickens Terminal, named for the British author Charles Dickens.

== History ==
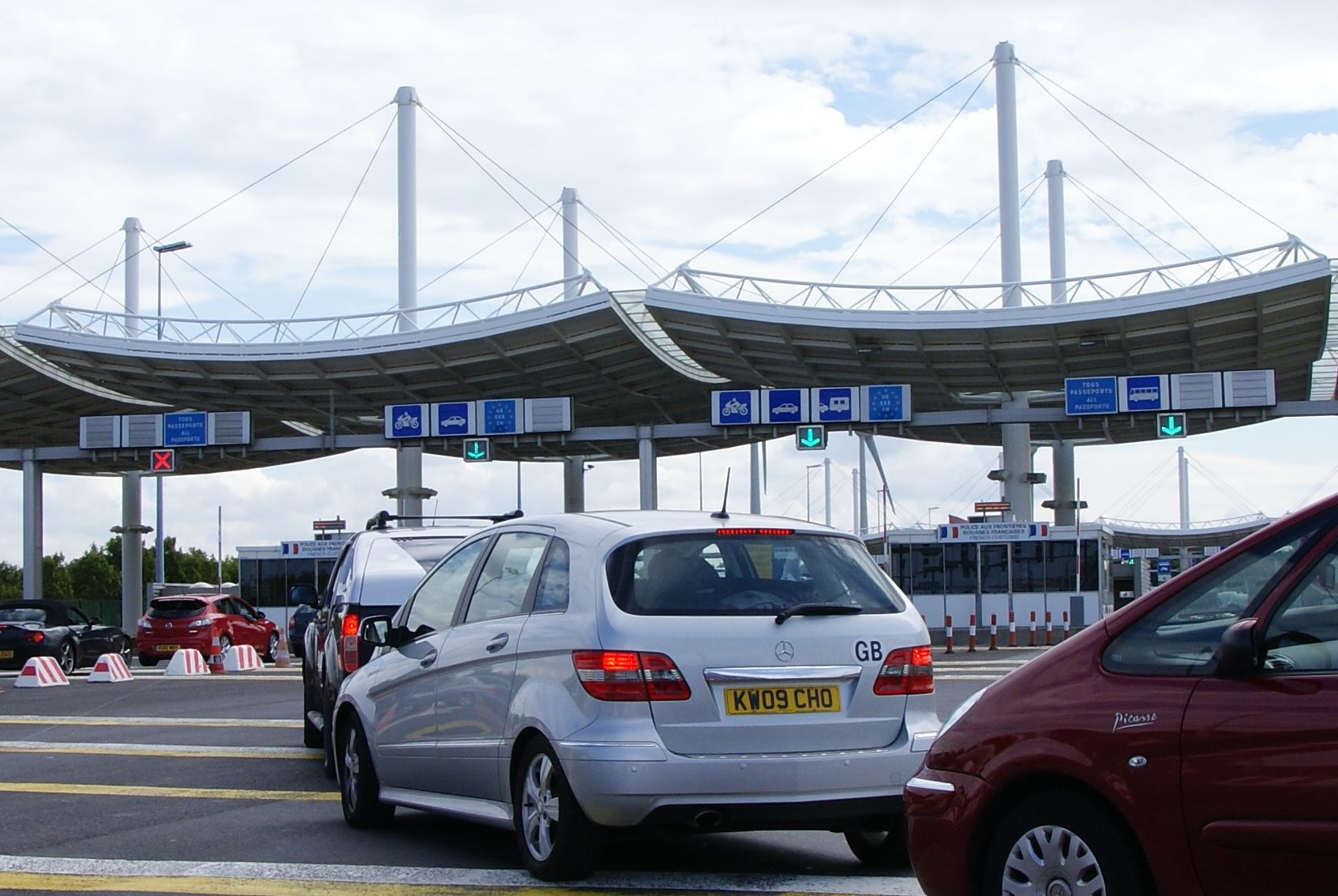
Border checkpoint for vehicles operated by the French Border Police and French Customs when leaving France and the Schengen Area at the juxtaposed controls at the Eurotunnel Calais Terminal.

As part of the Channel Tunnel project, the plan for services included the use of dedicated shuttle trains that would carry both passenger and freight vehicles between Britain and France, which would compete with the cross-channel ferries. In order to accommodate these services, it was planned to build a brand new vehicle terminal on each side of the tunnel that would allow cars and lorries to be loaded quickly onto the trains. The site chosen for the French terminal was Coquelles, near Calais, not far from the French tunnel portal.

The site chosen was a large greenfield area of more than 1700 acres, which provided significantly more space than the British terminal. However, a large proportion of the area chosen for construction was marshland, with anything from 3 to 10 metres (9.8 to 32.8 ft) of peat on top of the solid ground. As a consequence, 12,000,000 cubic metres (420,000,000 cu ft) of material had to be removed to provide solid foundations, before work could begin on building the actual facility.

The main parts of the passenger terminal to be built were the platforms and overbridges that connect it to the A16, and thence to the rest of the autoroute network. The tunnel was officially opened on 6 May 1994, with services between Cheriton and Coquelles beginning in July the same year, when the first freight shuttles started running. Passenger services then started in December 1994.

As a result of the Sangatte Protocol signed between France and the UK in 1991, juxtaposed controls have been established. Travellers going from Coquelles to Cheriton clear French exit checks and Customs as well as UK entry immigration and customs checks before boarding the train in Coquelles, rather than on arrival in Cheriton.

== Infrastructure ==
Terminal map

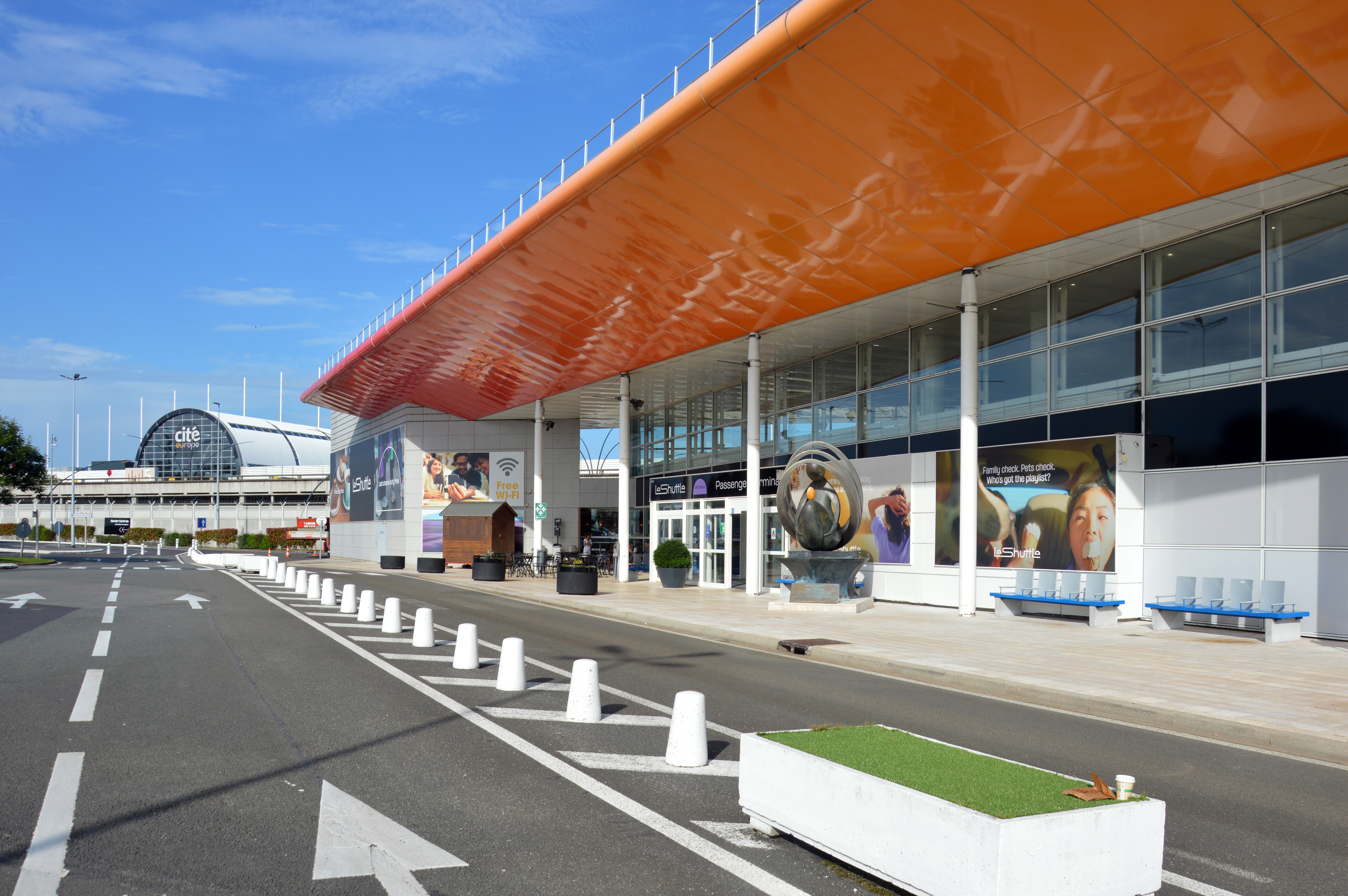
The passenger terminal building

The terminal consists of ten island platforms, with four overbridges connecting each platform to the autoroute. The overbridges are located at approximately equidistant points along the length of the platforms so that vehicles have to drive for as little distance as possible along the platforms themselves; vehicles unloaded from the front to the middle of the train would use the furthest bridge, while those unloaded from the centre to the rear would use the next bridge in, and vice versa for those vehicles embarking. The bridges at the western end of the platforms are intended for embarking vehicles, while those at the eastern end are for those disembarking. The island platforms are separated by single track, allowing vehicles to access the train from both sides.

The terminal is located at the end of a loop connected to the route from the tunnel; trains exiting the tunnel travel anti-clockwise around this loop and then pull into the terminal, meaning the locomotive that pulled the train will remain at the front for the next service through the tunnel. The terminal at Cheriton also has a loop arrangement, but instead trains travel clockwise; this is intended to ensure equal wear on the flange of the wheels.

The terminal has a larger loading gauge than the rest of the French network owing to the oversized trailers used to carry the road going vehicles. As a consequence, all maintenance of the rolling stock is undertaken within the small, self-contained Channel Tunnel rail network, with the major work carried out at the large maintenance facility at Coquelles.
