= Direction nationale de la police aux frontières =

Directorate of the French National Police

National Directorate of the Border Police
- Direction nationale de la police aux frontières (French)
- Logo of DNPAF
- Active: 1999–present
- Country: France
- Agency: National Police
- Role: Border control
- Headquarters: 18, rue des Pyrénées, Paris

Commanders
- Current commander: National Director Valérie Minne

Website
- Official website

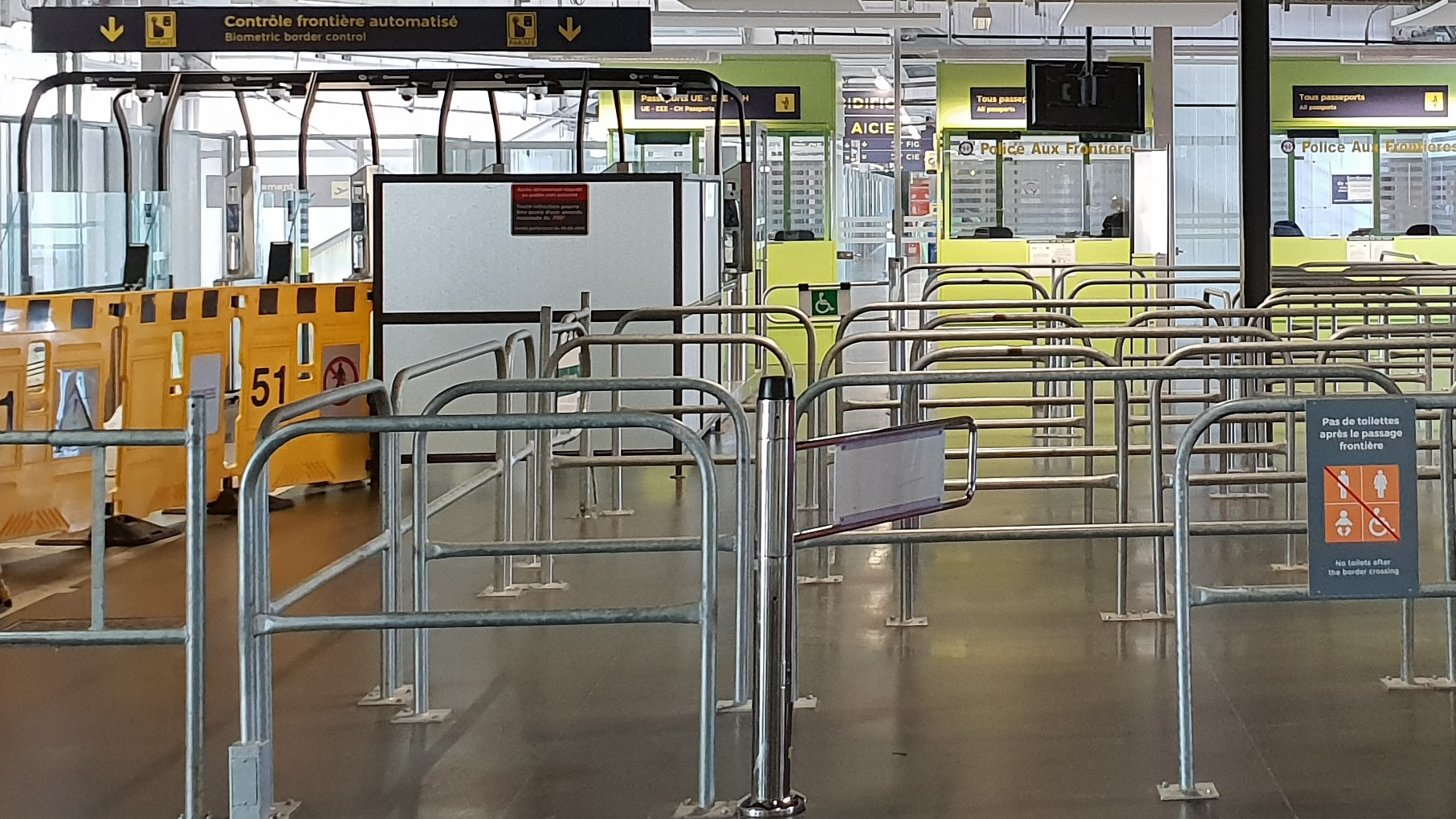
Border control at Marseille Provence Airport (with PARAFE self-service gates under construction on the left).

La direction nationale de la police aux frontières (DNPAF; English: National Directorate of the Border Police) is a directorate of the French National Police that is responsible for border control at certain border crossing points in France.

It was established in 1973 as police de l'air et des frontières. On 29 January 1999, it was given its current name, and its existing organisational character was determined in 2011.

It works alongside its British counterpart, the UK Border Force, at the juxtaposed controls in Calais and along the Channel Tunnel Rail Link with British Transport Police; and at the Port of Dover with Kent Police and Port of Dover Police.

Since 1995, customs have replaced the border police in carrying out immigration control at smaller border checkpoints, in particular at maritime ports and regional airports.

== Organisation ==
DNPAF is headed by a central director assisted by a deputy central director and includes 2 different commands:

- A central command, consisting of a staff, support services, and 3 sub-directorates;
- A territorial command, made up of DNPAF's zonal directorates.

DNPAF has 10,088 agents as of January 1, 2013.

=== Central command ===
The central command of DNPAF, headed by a central director and senior police officers from the design and management body, is composed of:

- A staff,
- Irregular immigration and territorial services sub-directorate, to which is attached the Central Office for the Suppression of Irregular Immigration and the Employment of Untitled Foreigners (OCRIEST) which coordinates and animates the activity deployed by the investigative units (mobile research brigades - BMR) of the decentralized services,
- a Resources Branch,
- a sub-directorate for cross-border international affairs and security, in particular responsible for monitoring relations with the European Border and Coast Guard Agency (FRONTEX),
- the National Railway Police Service.

=== Territorial command ===
The DNPAF extends its action throughout the national territory of France and overseas through a territorial network based on 7 zonal directorates (DZPAF North, DZPAF East, DZPAF South East, DZPAF South, DZPAF South West, DZPAF West, DZPAF Antilles-Guyane), 2 airport directorates (Charles De Gaulle Airport/ Paris–Le Bourget Airport), 4 directorates (DPAF New Caledonia, French Polynesia, St Pierre and Miquelon and Mayotte), 45 departmental directorates (DDPAF), 7 railway brigades, 7 poles of analysis and operational management, 10 brigades of aeronautical police. 15 administrative detention centres are controlled by the DNPAF.

== See also ==
- List of border crossing points in France
- Schengen Area
- Juxtaposed controls
