= Hôtel de Ville, Calais =

Town hall in Calais, France

Hôtel de Ville
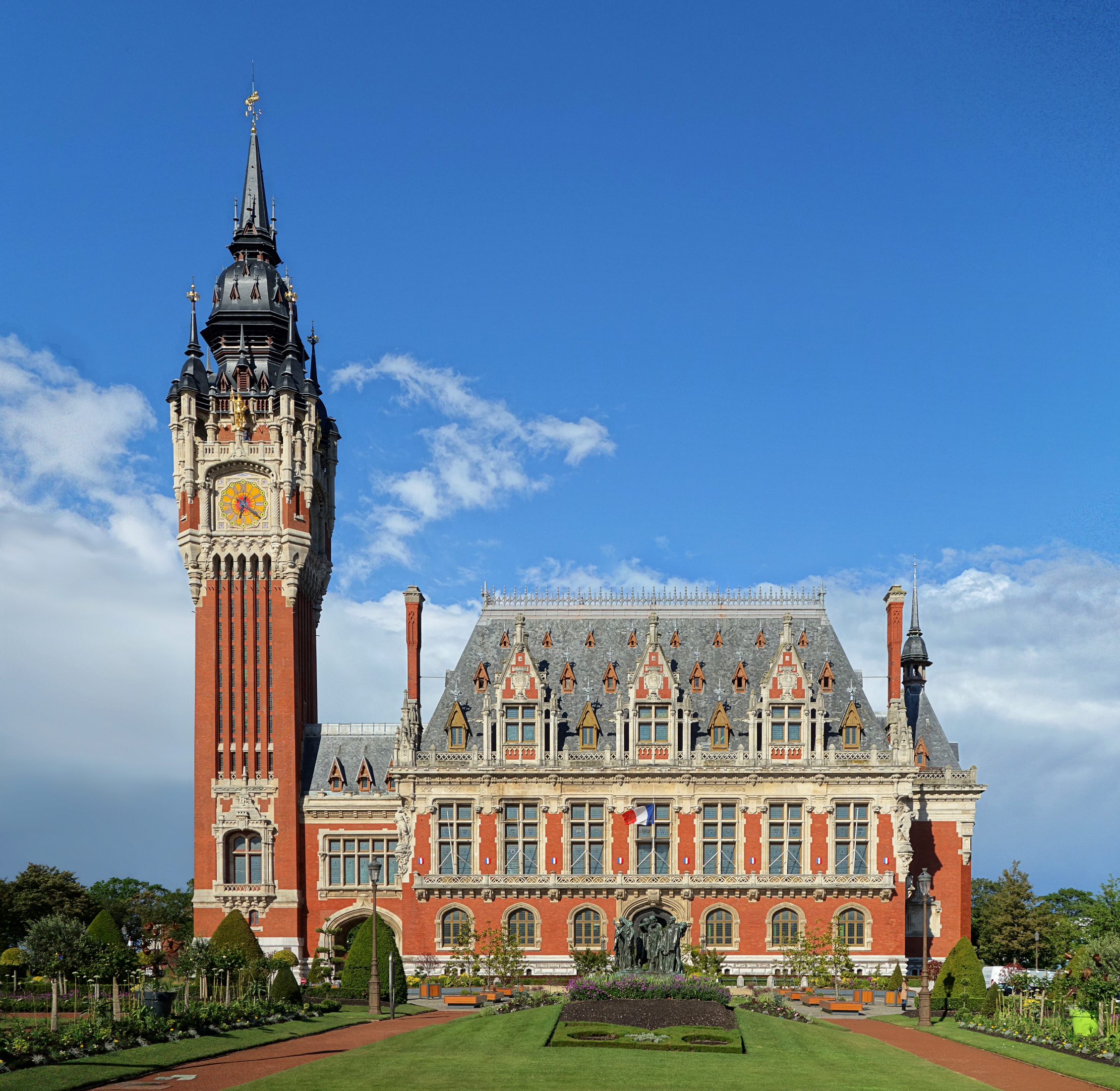
- The main frontage of the Hôtel de Ville in May 2014

General information
- Type: City hall
- Architectural style: Renaissance Revival and Flemish styles
- Location: Calais, France
- Coordinates: 50°57′09″N 1°51′16″E
- Completed: 1923

Height
- Height: 72 metres (236 ft)

Design and construction
- Architects: Louis Debrouwer

UNESCO World Heritage Site
- Part of: Belfries of Belgium and France
- Criteria: Cultural: ii, iv
- Reference: 943
- Inscription: 1999 (23rd Session)

Monument historique
- Official name: Hôtel de ville
- Type: Inscrit
- Designated: 2003
- Reference no.: PA62000055

The Hôtel de Ville (French pronunciation: [otɛl də vil], City Hall) is the seat of the city council in Calais, France. The building features a belfry of red brick and white limestone which is 72 metres (236 ft) high. It was designated a monument historique by the French government in 2003.

== History ==
An ancient Hôtel de Ville, located in Old Calais, was commissioned by Francis II, as a place where merchants could meet, in 1559. An extra terrace was erected there in 1818.

In 1885, Old Calais, which was centred round Église Note Dame on the north side of the Canal de Calais, merged with Saint-Pierre, which centred round Église Saint-Pierre on the south side of the Canal de Calais. This led to calls for a new Hôtel de Ville to serve both districts. The site the council selected was in the area between the two towns, an area known as the "Plain dite du Sahara", because it was completely covered in sand dunes.

Work on the new building started in 1912, but was temporarily paused during the First World War. The partly-built structure was hit by a German bomb on the night of 3 September 1917. Work on the building resumed after the war. It was designed by Louis Debrouwer of Dunkirk in the Renaissance Revival and Flemish styles, built in red brick from Kortrijk, white limestone and reinforced concrete, and was completed in 1923.

The design involved an asymmetrical main frontage facing west onto the Place du Soldat Inconnu. The layout involved a belfry, which was 72 metres (236 ft) high, to the north of the site, a recessed connecting bay, and a main block, of seven bays, to the south of the site. The belfry was designed in the style of a flame. The main block featured a round headed doorway in the central bay. It was fenestrated by a series of round headed windows on the ground floor, by squared headed mullioned and transomed windows on the first floor and by three tall dormer windows at attic level. There were also three rows of smaller dormer windows, decreasing in size, projecting from the slate roof. The building was officially opened on 12 April 1925.

Following the liberation of the town by the First Canadian Army on 30 September 1944, during the Second World War, a major programme of reconstruction was necessary as many buildings, including the Grand Theatre and the town hall, had been damaged in the fighting.

In 2005, the town hall belfry was added to the UNESCO World Heritage Site group of the Belfries of Belgium and France.

Works of art inside the building included stained glass windows depicting the liberation of Calais by François, Duke of Guise, in 1558, and a tapestry by Jeanne Thil depicting the Les bourgeois de Calais ("The Burghers of Calais"). This relates to the six leading citizens who were taken by Edward III of England after the siege of Calais during the Hundred Years' War. In front of the building there is a sculpture by Auguste Rodin, also depicting "The Burghers of Calais".
