= Tour du Guet =

Watchtower in Pas-de-Calais, France

Coordinates: 50.95889°N 1.84972°E

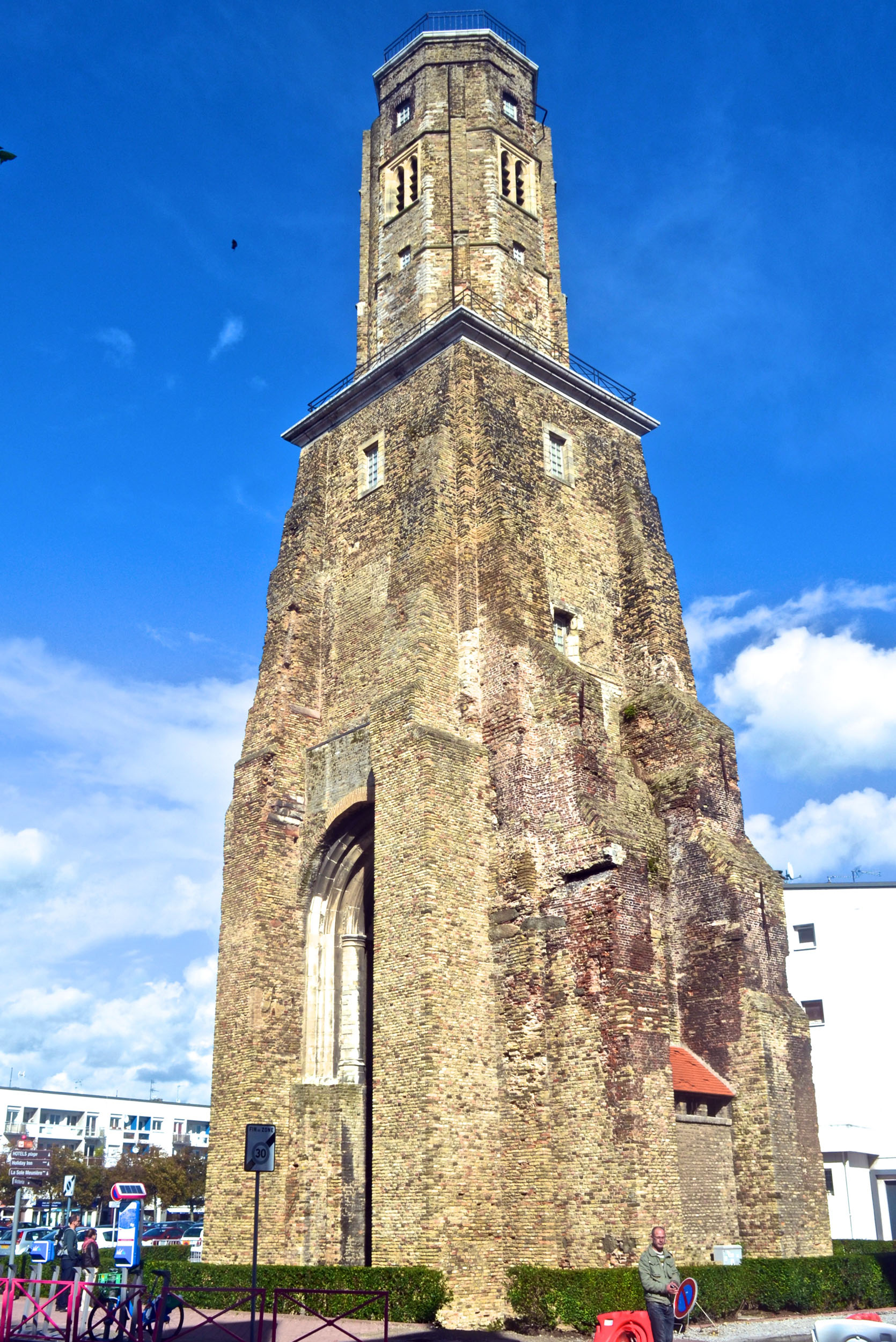
Tour du Guet, Calais.

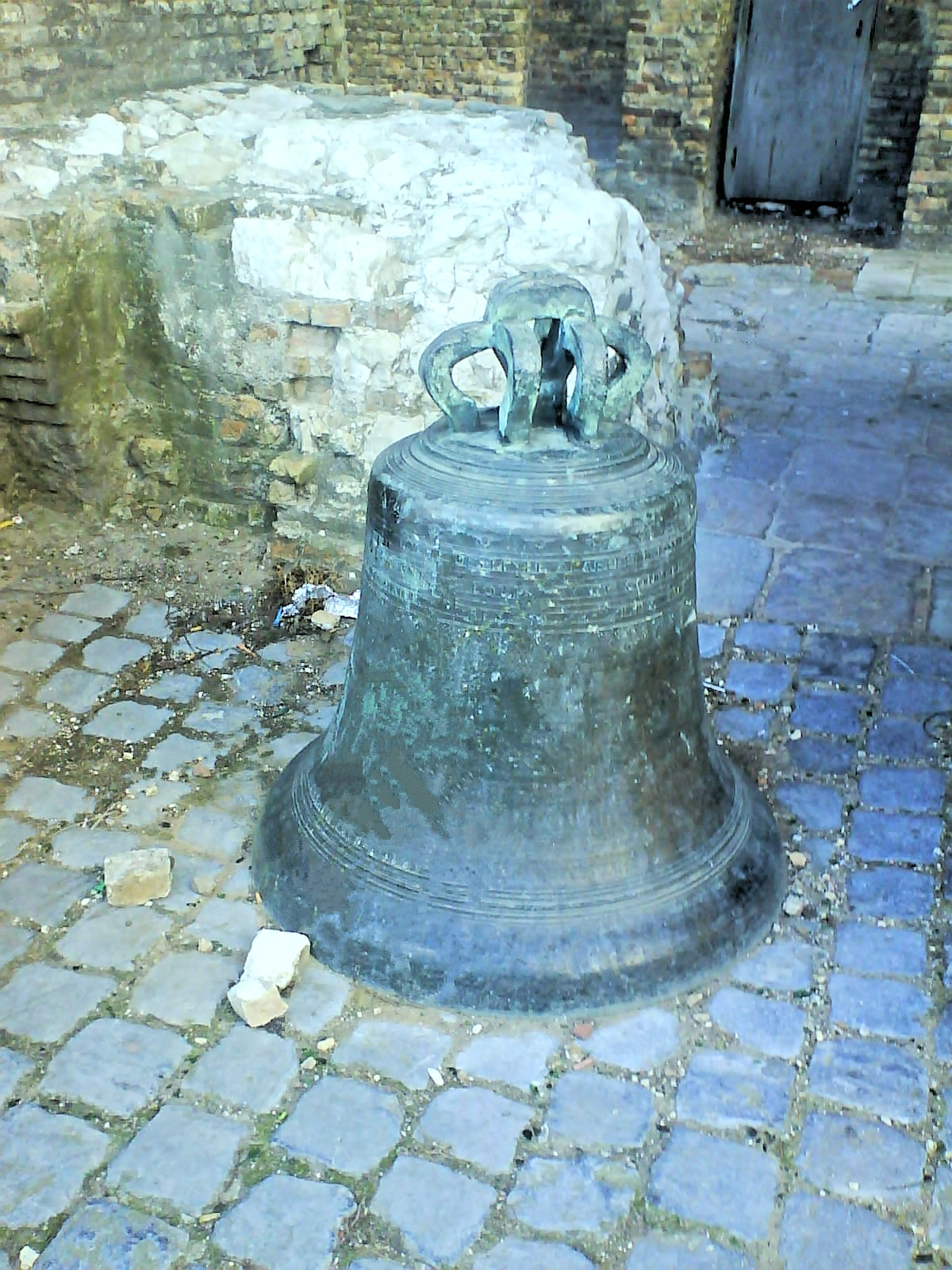
Bell at the Tour du Guet, Calais.

The Tour du Guet is a 13th-century watchtower in Calais, Pas-de-Calais, northern France. Located on Place d'Armes behind the Hotel de Ville, it is 39 metres (128 ft) in height, and features a dovecote for carrier pigeons. The tower dates from 1214, when Philip I, Count of Boulogne built fortifications in the town. Damaged by a 1580 earthquake, it was used as a lighthouse until 1848, when it became a watch tower. During World War I, it served as a military post.
