= List of mayors of Calais =

This is a list of the mayors of Calais since 1878.

- Jean François Mussel (1878–1879)
- Marie Pierre Darnel (1879–1882)
- Antoine Louis Debette (1882–1882)
- Omer Julien Dewavrin (1882–1885)
- Charles Ravisse (1885–1885)
- Paul Gustave Van Grutten (1885–1888)
- Georges Wintrebert (1888–1889)
- Émile Paclot (1889–1892)
- Omer Julien Dewavrin (1892–1896)
- Émile Salembier (1896–1898)
- Alfred Delcluze (1898–1900)
- Pierre Noyon (1900–1901)
- Edmond Basset (1901–1908)
- Émile Salembier (1908–1912)
- Charles Morieux (1912–1919)
- Joseph Duquenoy-Martel (1919–1923)
- Hans Apeness (1923–1925)
- Léon Vincent (17 May 1925 – 7 September 1933)
- Victor Mussel (7 September 1933 – 31 October 1933)
- Léon Vincent (31 October 1933 – 11 March 1934)
- Jules Lefebvre (11 March 1934 – 19 May 1935)
- Lucien Vadez (19 May 1935 – 2 September 1939)
- André Gerschel (1939–1940)
- Edgar Verschoore (1940–1944)
- Georges François (1944)
- Jacques Vendroux (1944 – 30 October 1945)
- Hubert Défachelles (30 October 1945 – 19 October 1947)
- Gaston Berthe (19 October 1947 – February 1950)
- Henri Joseph Mullard (February 1950)
- Gaston Berthe (February 1950 – 28 March 1952)
- André Parmentier (28 March 1952 – 15 March 1959)
- Jacques Vendroux (15 March 1959 – 15 March 1969)
- Charles Beaugrand (15 March 1969 – 14 March 1971)
- Jean-Jacques Barthe (14 March 1971 – 18 March 2001)
- Jacky Hénin (18 March 2001 – 16 March 2008)
- Natacha Bouchart (16 March 2008–present)
