= Calais Lighthouse =

Lighthouse in Hauts-de-France, France

Calais Lighthouse Phare de Calais
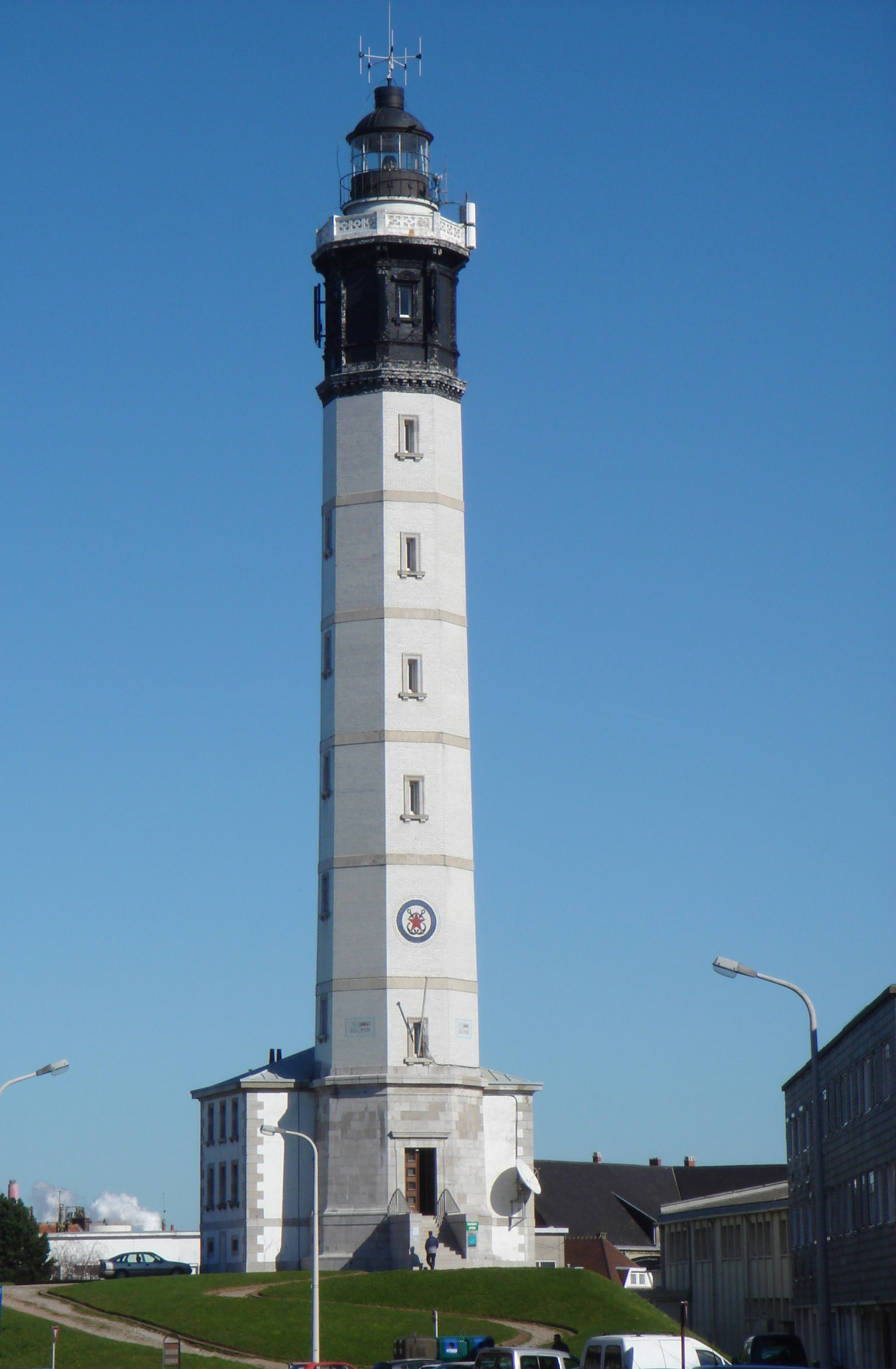
- Lighthouse located in the streets of Calais.
- Location: Calais, Hauts-de-France; France
- Coordinates: 50.961360°N 1.853622°E

Tower
- Constructed: 1848
- Construction: masonry tower
- Automated: 1987
- Height: 55 m (180 ft)
- Shape: octagonal tower
- Power source: vegetable oil, mineral oil, electricity
- Heritage: classified historical monument, monument historique inscrit

Light
- First lit: 15 October 1848
- Focal height: 59.8 m (196 ft)
- Lens: Halogen 250 MM Rotating
- Range: 23.5 nautical miles (43.5 km)
- Characteristic: Fl (4) W 15s.

Calais Lighthouse (French: Phare de Calais) is located in Calais in Pas-de-Calais. The Lighthouse is located in the residential streets near the Port of Calais and is a significant landmark as well as a navigational aid to ships and ferries using the Straits of Dover.

== History ==
There was a beacon at the summit of the watchtower from 1818. King Louis-Philippe in his plans to improve French ports decided the construction of a first-class lighthouse in Calais. This lighthouse started operating in 1848 and was electrified in 1883. After escaping the destruction of the Second World War it was automated in 1987. The Calais lighthouse is classified as a French Monument historique since 19/04/2011.

== Description ==
The lighthouse is 53m high, its tower is octagonal outside and round inside with walls 1.90m at the base and 1.50m at the summit. The foundations descend 7.40m under the cellars. The staircase has 271 steps leading up to the lantern. The central light of the lighthouse is permanent and the lantern, whose panels shut off the light, turns around the light, giving 4 flashes of 2/10th of a second every 15 seconds.

== See also ==
- List of lighthouses in France
