= Calais =

Calais Kales (West Flemish) Calés (Picard)
- Subprefecture and commune
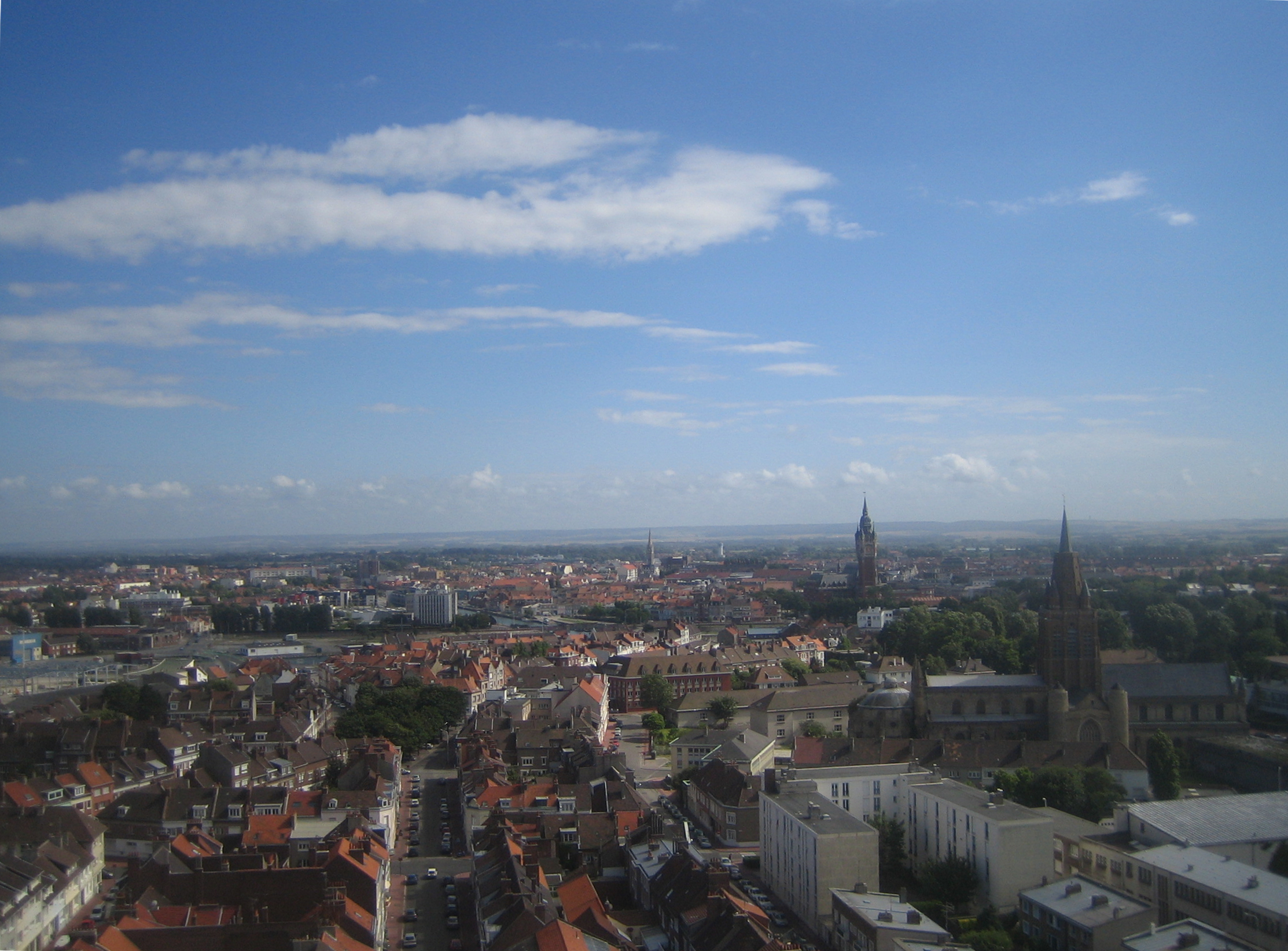
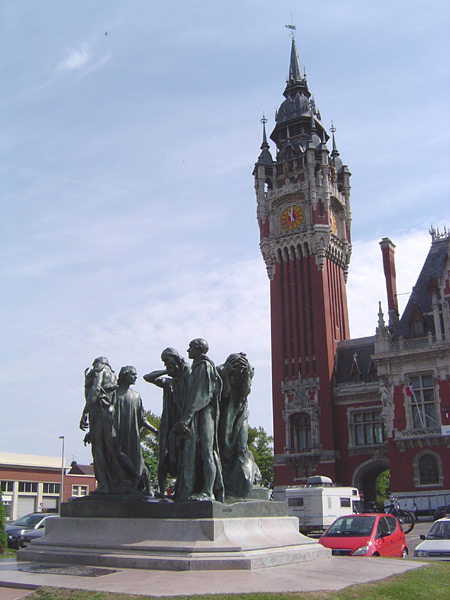
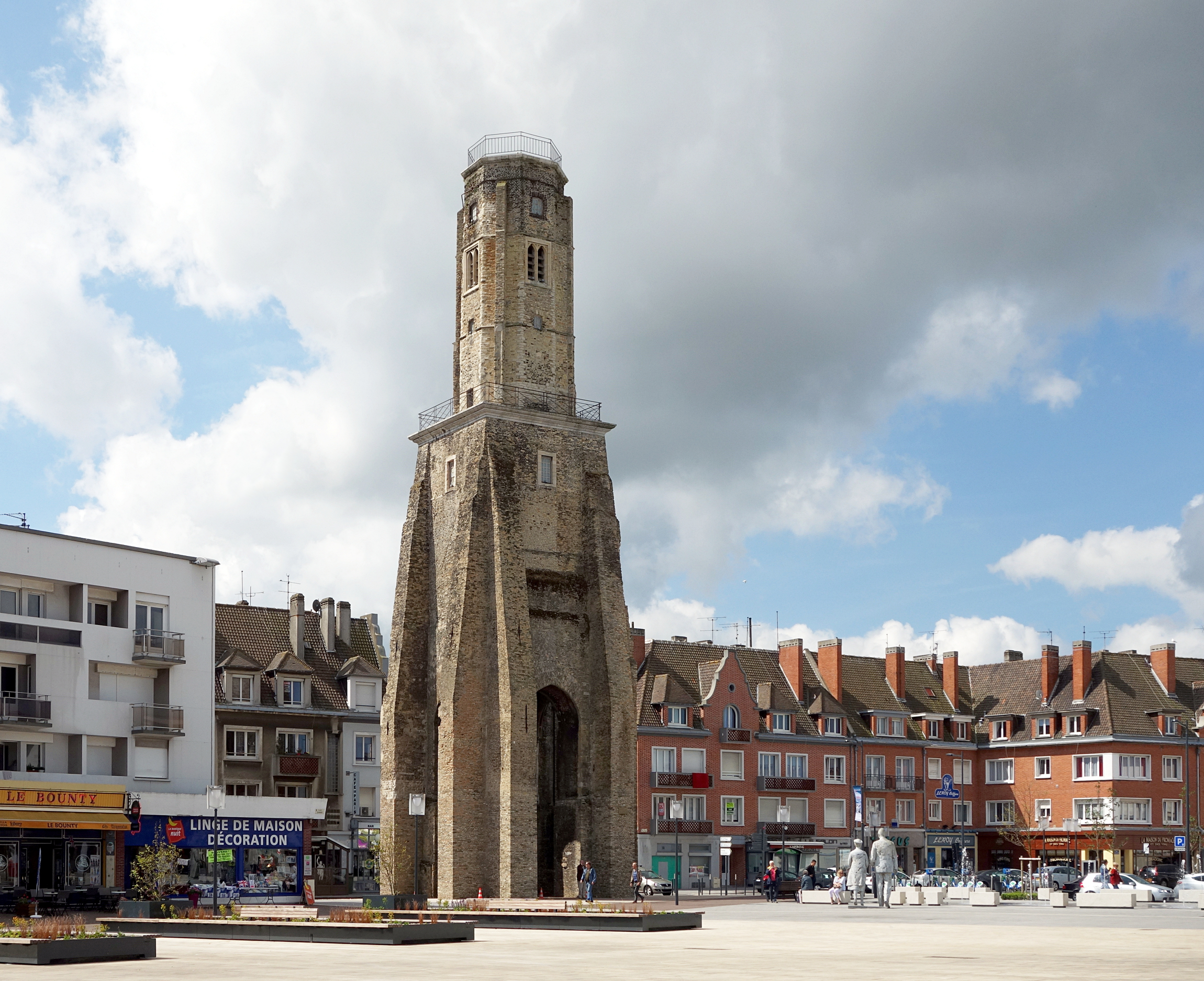
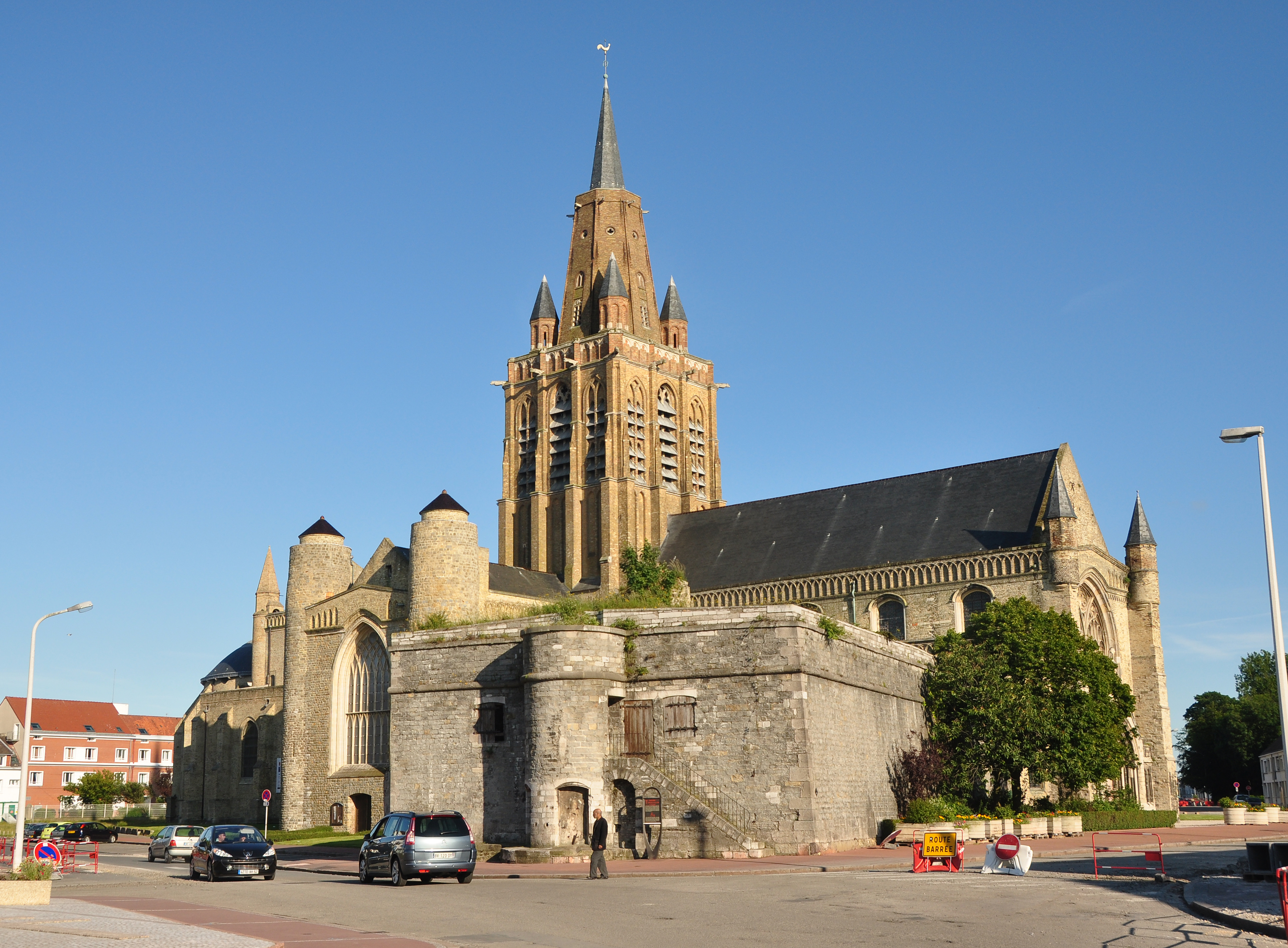
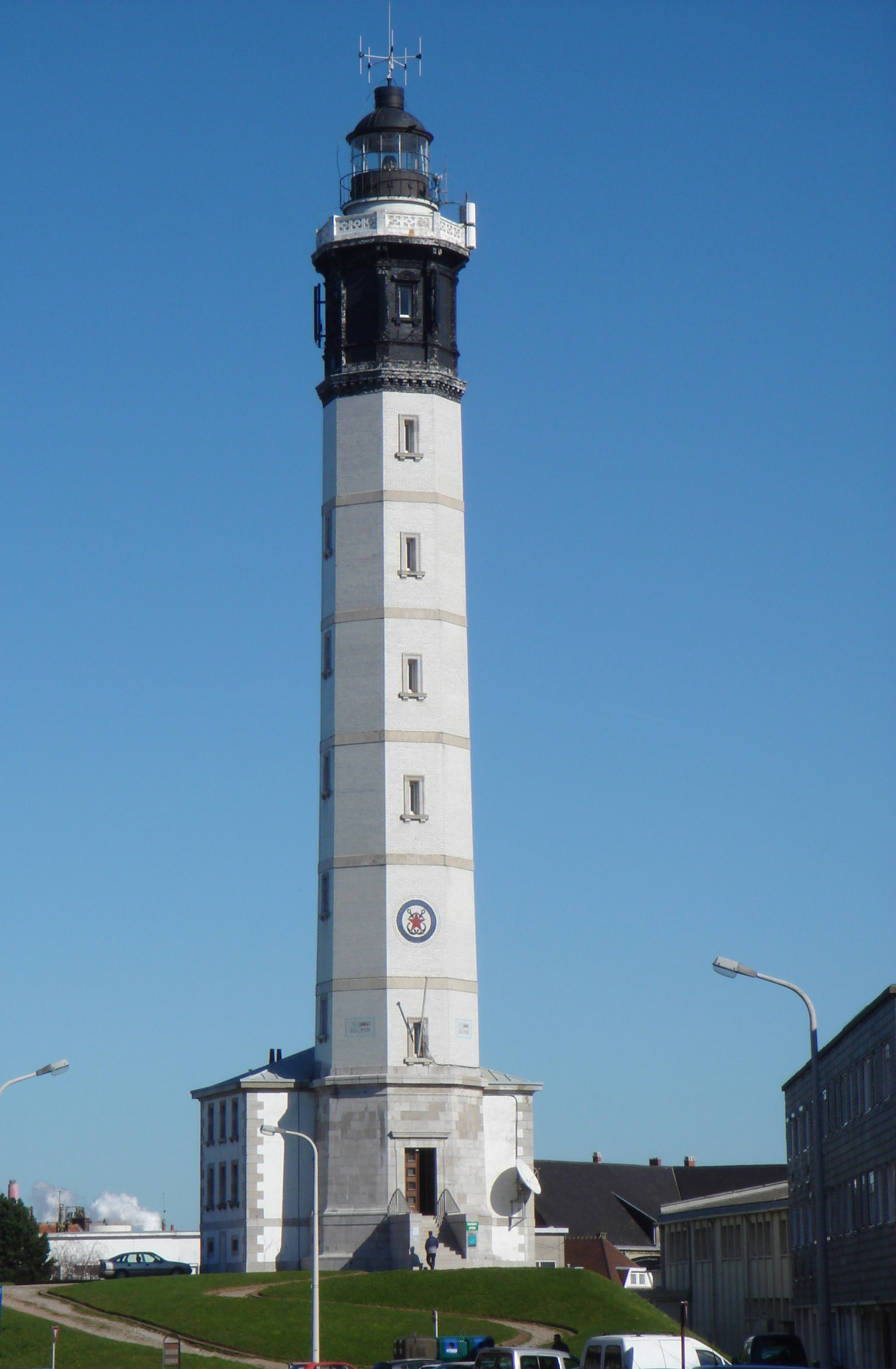
- Calais skyline Burghers of Calais and Hôtel de Ville Tour du Guet Notre-Dame de Calais Calais Lighthouse

- Flag Coat of arms
- Location of Calais
- Location within France Location within Hauts-de-France
- Coordinates: 50°56′53″N 01°51′23″E
- Country: France
- Region: Hauts-de-France
- Department: Pas-de-Calais
- Arrondissement: Calais
- Canton: Calais-1, 2 and 3
- Intercommunality: CA Grand Calais Terres et Mers

Government
  - Mayor (2026–32): Natacha Bouchart (DVD)
- Area^{1}: 33.5 km^{2} (12.9 sq mi)
- Highest elevation: 18 m (59 ft)
- Lowest elevation: 0 m (0 ft)
- Population (2023): 67,571
  - Density: 2,020/km^{2} (5,220/sq mi)
- Demonym: Calaisiens
- Time zone: UTC+01:00 (CET)
  - Summer (DST): UTC+02:00 (CEST)
- INSEE/Postal code: 62193 /62100
- Website: City; Port
- ^{1} French Land Register data, which excludes lakes, ponds, glaciers > 1 km^{2} (0.386 sq mi or 247 acres) and river estuaries.

Calais (UK: /ˈkæleɪ/ KAL-ay, US: /kæˈleɪ/ kal-AY, traditionally /ˈkælɪs/ KAL-iss, French: [kalɛ]) (Note: Picard: Calés; West Flemish: Kales.) is a French major port city in the Pas-de-Calais department, of which it is a subprefecture. Calais is the largest city in Pas-de-Calais. The population of the city proper is 67,585; that of the urban area is 144,488 (2022). Calais overlooks the Strait of Dover, the narrowest point in the English Channel, which is only 34 km (21 mi) wide here, and is the closest French town to England. The White Cliffs of Dover can easily be seen from Calais on a clear day. Calais is a major port for ferries between France and England. The Channel Tunnel has connected Calais and Folkestone since 1994.

Because of its position, Calais has been a major port and an important centre for transport and trading with England since the Middle Ages. Calais came under English control after Edward III of England captured the city in 1347, followed by a treaty in 1360 that formally assigned Calais to English rule. Calais grew into a thriving centre for wool production, and came to be called the "brightest jewel in the English crown" because of its importance as the gateway for the tin, lead, lace and wool trades (or "staples"). Calais remained under English control until its recapture by France in 1558.

During World War II, the town was virtually razed to the ground. In May 1940, it was a strategic bombing target of the invading German forces, who took it during the siege of Calais. The Germans built massive bunkers along the coast, in preparation for launching missiles at England.

The old part of the town, Calais-Nord, is on an artificial island surrounded by canals and harbours. The modern part of the town, St-Pierre, lies to the south and south-east. In the centre of the old town is the Place d'Armes, in which stands the Tour du Guet, or watch-tower, a structure built in the 13th century, which was used as a lighthouse until 1848 when a new lighthouse was built by the port. South east of the Place is the church of Notre-Dame, built during the English occupancy of Calais. Arguably, it is the only church built in the English perpendicular style in all of France. In this church, former French President Charles de Gaulle married Yvonne Vendroux. South of the Place and opposite the Parc St Pierre is the Hôtel-de-ville (the town hall), and the belfry from the early 20th century. Today, Calais is visited by more than 10 million annually. Aside from being a key transport hub, Calais is also a notable fishing port and a centre for fish marketing, and some 3,000 people are still employed in the lace industry for which the town is also famed.

== Names and etymology ==
The name Calais first appears in the historical record late in the twelfth century AD in a mention by Count Gerard of Guelders of a charter by his father Matthew of Alsace, Some references mention the Latin name Calesium being used as early as the ninth century but without providing sources for the claim. Medieval Latin Calesium derives ultimately from Latin Caletum, in turn from Caletes, a Belgic or Gallic tribe dwelling in Pays de Caux, in present-day Normandy. The Gaulish ethnonym Caletoi literally means "the hard ones", that is to say "the stubborn" or "the tough" and derives from the Proto-Celtic stem *kaletos- ("hard, cruel, strong") Early French sources use a bewildering array of spellings from Kaleeis to Kalais to Calays together with Latin-based Calaisiacum, Calesetum and Calasium. (Note: Other French variants included Kaleis, Kalet, Kales, Kalees, Chalais, Kalesium, Caleys, Calez, Calai, Chalays, Callais, Callès, Calisia and Callays.) The modern French spelling of Calais first appeared in 1331.

The earliest English name for the city was the Anglo-Norman Caleis. In Middle and Early Modern English, variants including Caleys, Calais, Calays, Callis and Cales were used. (Note: In English sources, Caleis, Cales, Caleyes, Calis, Callaice, Callais, Calles, Calleis, Calleys, Callice, Callies, Callis, Calliss, Callys, Calys and Calysse are all attested.) In later Middle English, the name of the city was most commonly spelt Cales, and this spelling survived well into the modern period, (Note: Pepys uses "Cales" in the 16 June 1664 entry of his diary.) but Shakespeare for example used the spelling Callice. Confusingly, the name Cales found in the sarcastic rhyme beginning "A gentleman of Wales, a knight of Cales" and the ballad "The Winning of Cales" collected by Thomas Percy refers not to Calais, but to Cádiz in Spain.

The Cales spelling was also used in other European languages at the time, including Spanish, Italian and German and it is reflected in the city's name in the local Picard language, Calés.

Other archaic names for the city are Portuguese Calêsio and German Kalen. Kales, the city's historic name in Dutch and West Flemish (once spoken in the area) was retained until more recently in the name for the Strait of Dover, Nauw van Kales, and is still used in Dutch sources wishing to emphasise former linguistic ties to the area.

Though the modern French spelling of Calais gradually supplanted other variants in English, the pronunciation /ˈkælɪs/ (KAL-iss) persisted and survives in other towns named for the European city including Calais, Maine, and Calais, Vermont, in the United States. In "De Gustibus" (1855), Robert Browning rhymes Calais with malice. (Note: Though paraphrasing Mary I of England: "Queen Mary's saying serves for me— (When fortune's malice Lost her, Calais.) Open my heart and you will see Graved inside of it, "Italy."". This alludes to Mary's alleged comment on the 1558 loss of Calais to France: "When I am dead and opened, you shall find 'Calais' lying in my heart.")

The pronunciation shift can be seen in the 19th century where the /ˈkælɪs/ pronunciation with the s ending was prescribed through much of the century, but was disappearing by the end. In the beginning of the twentieth century, the English pronunciation /ˈkæleɪ/ KAL-ay with stress on the first syllable was firmly established.

== History ==
=== Early history ===
Sources on the early history of habitation in the area is limited. It is sometimes claimed that the Romans called the settlement Caletum and that it was the departure point for Julius Caesar's invasion of Britain. However, the name Caletum does not appear in Caesar's accounts of the invasion. Caesar describes his departure point as Portus Itius, which is believed to have been near Boulogne. At that time Calais was an island in the North Sea.

Calais was an English outpost for many centuries while it was an island surrounded by marshes, and difficult to attack from the mainland. At some time before the 10th century, it would have been a Dutch-speaking fishing village on a sandy beach backed by pebbles and a creek, with a natural harbour at the west edge of the early medieval estuary of the river Aa. As the pebble and sand ridge extended eastward from Calais, the haven behind it developed into fen, as the estuary progressively filled with silt and peat. Afterwards, canals were cut between Saint-Omer, the trading centre formerly at the head of the estuary, and three places to the west, centre and east on the newly formed coast: respectively Calais, Gravelines and Dunkirk. Calais was improved by the Count of Flanders in 997 and fortified by the Count of Boulogne in 1224.

The first document mentioning the existence of this community is the town charter granted by Mathieu d'Alsace, Count of Boulogne, in 1181 to Gerard de Guelders; Calais thus became part of the county of Boulogne. In 1189, Richard the Lionheart is documented to have landed at Calais on his journey to the Third Crusade.

=== 14th–15th century; the Pale of Calais ===
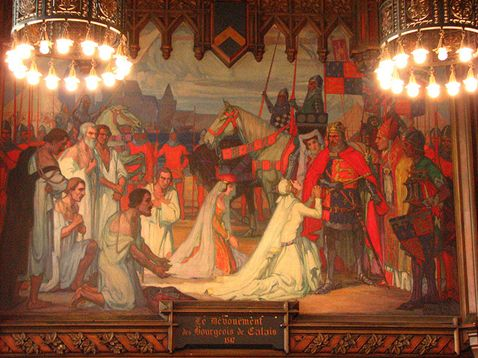
"Le Devouement des Bourgeois de Calais 1347", "The Devotion of the Burghers of Calais". Philippa of Hainault begs King Edward III to spare the lives of the six volunteers for martyrdom. 19th-century mural in Council Chamber, Hôtel de Ville, Calais.

English wool trade interests and King Edward III's claims to be heir to the Kingdom of France, led to the Battle of Crécy, between England and France, in 1346, followed by Edward's siege and capture of Calais, in 1347. Angered, the English king demanded reprisals against the town's citizens for holding out for so long ("obstinate defence") and ordered that the town's population be killed en masse. He agreed, however, to spare them, on condition that six of the principal citizens would come to him, bareheaded and barefooted and with ropes around their necks, and give themselves up to death. On their arrival, he ordered their execution, but pardoned them when his queen, Philippa of Hainault, begged him to spare their lives. This event is commemorated in The Burghers of Calais (Les Bourgeois de Calais), one of the most famous sculptures by Auguste Rodin, erected in the city in 1895. Though sparing the lives of the delegation members, King Edward drove out most of the French inhabitants, and settled the town with English. The municipal charter of Calais, previously granted by the Countess of Artois, was reconfirmed by Edward that year (1347).

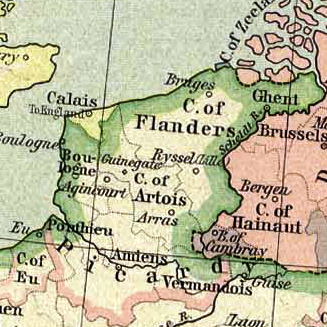
Map showing the situation of 1477, with Calais, the English Pale and neighbouring counties

In 1360, the Treaty of Brétigny assigned Guînes, Marck and Calais—collectively the "Pale of Calais"—to English rule in perpetuity, but this assignment was informally and only partially implemented. On 9 February 1363 the town was made an English staple port. It remained part of the Diocese of Thérouanne from 1379, keeping an ecclesiastical tie with France.

The town came to be called the "brightest jewel in the English crown" owing to its great importance as a gateway port for the tin, lead, cloth and wool trades (or "staples"). Its customs revenues amounted at times to a third of the English government's revenue, with wool being the most important element by far. Of its population of about 12,000 people, as many as 5,400 were recorded as having been connected with the wool trade. The governorship or Captaincy of Calais was a lucrative and highly prized public office; the famous Dick Whittington was simultaneously Lord Mayor of the City of London and Mayor of the Calais Staple in 1407.

The Marches of Calais in the time of Henry VIII. (Top: south, bottom: north): "Cales Market" within citadel, shown at bottom, top "Gyenes Castel", bottom left "Graveling", bottom right "Sand Gat"

Calais was an integral part of the English trading economy, though not regarded as being a part of the Kingdom of England until the days of King Henry VIII, from which time the Pale of Calais sent two members to the English Parliament. The continued English hold on Calais however depended on expensively maintained fortifications, as the town lacked any natural defences. Maintaining Calais was a costly business that was frequently tested by the forces of France and the Duchy of Burgundy, with the Franco-Burgundian border running nearby. The British historian Geoffrey Elton once remarked "Calais—expensive and useless—was better lost than kept". The duration of the English hold over Calais was, to a large extent, the result of the feud between Burgundy and France: both sides coveted the town, but preferred to see England control it rather than their domestic rivals. The stalemate was broken by the victory of the French crown over Burgundy following Joan of Arc's final battle in the siege of Compiègne in 1430, and the later incorporation of the duchy into France.

=== 16th century ===
The arms of English Calais recorded in the College of Arms

In 1532, the English King Henry VIII visited Calais and his men calculated that the town had about 2,400 beds and stabling to keep some 2,000 horses. Following the royal visit, the town's governance was reformed in 1536, aiming to strengthen ties with England. As part of this move, Calais became a parliamentary borough sending burgesses to the House of Commons of the Parliament of England. However, despite these attempts to ingratiate Calais within the kingdom, the historian David Potter states that Calais was "never totally anglicised".

In September 1552, the English adventurer Thomas Stukley, who had been for some time in the French service, betrayed to the authorities in London some French plans for the capture of Calais, to be followed by a descent upon England. Stukley himself might have been the author of these plans.

On 7 January 1558, King Henry II of France sent forces led by Francis, Duke of Guise, who laid siege to Calais. When the French attacked, they were able to surprise the English at the critical strongpoint of Fort Nieulay and the sluice gates, which could have flooded the attackers, remained unopened. The loss was regarded by Queen Mary I of England as a dreadful misfortune. When she heard the news, she reportedly said, "When I am dead and opened, you shall find 'Philip' [her husband] and 'Calais' lying in my heart." In the 1564 Treaty of Troyes, Queen Elizabeth I agreed to a final acknowledgement that the French would retain Calais, with the English receiving a payment of 120,000 crowns. The historian David J. Wildman describes the loss of Calais as a 'Tudor Brexit', and that it had the unintended consequence of forcing the English to look to the New World for economic opportunities.

The region around Calais, then-known as the Calaisis, was renamed the Pays Reconquis ("Reconquered Country") in commemoration of its recovery by the French. Use of the term is reminiscent of the Spanish Reconquista, with which the French were certainly familiar—and, since it occurred in the context of a war with Spain (Philip II of Spain was at the time Queen Mary's consort), might have been intended as a deliberate snub.

The town was captured by the Spanish on 24 April 1596 in an invasion mounted from the nearby Spanish Netherlands by Archduke Albert of Austria, but it was returned to France under the Treaty of Vervins in May 1598.

=== 17th century to World War I ===
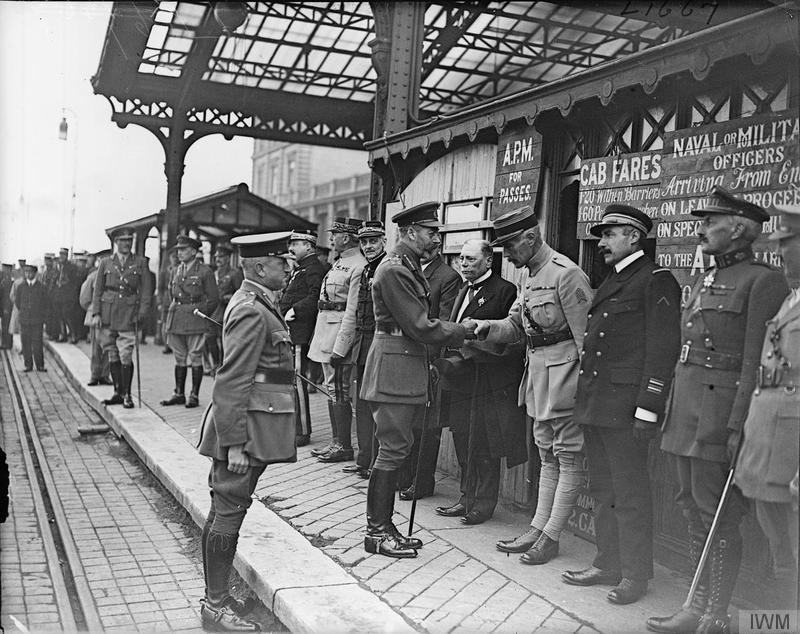
George V of the United Kingdom meets French and Belgian officers in Calais in 1918.

Calais remained an important maritime city and smuggling centre throughout the 17th century. However, during the next century, the port of Calais began to stagnate gradually, as the nearby ports of Boulogne and Dunkirk began to rise and compete.

The French revolution at the end of the 18th century did not disturb Calais and no executions took place.

In 1805, Calais hosted part of Napoleon's army and invasion fleet for several months before his aborted invasion of Britain. From October to December 1818, the British army used Calais as their departing port to return home after occupying post-Waterloo France. General Murray appointed Sir Manley Power to oversee the evacuation of British troops from France. Cordial relations had been restored by that time and on 3 December, the mayor of Calais wrote a letter to Power to express thanks for his "considerate treatment of the French and of the town of Calais during the embarkation."

The population in 1847 was 12,580, many of whom were English. It was one of the main ports for British travellers to Europe.

In World War I the British Expeditionary Force or BEF arrived in Calais on its way to the nearby frontline cutting through Nord-Pas-de-Calais and Flanders. Calais was a key port for the supply of arms and reinforcements to the Western Front. In the 1930s, the town was known for being a politically socialist stronghold.

=== World War II ===
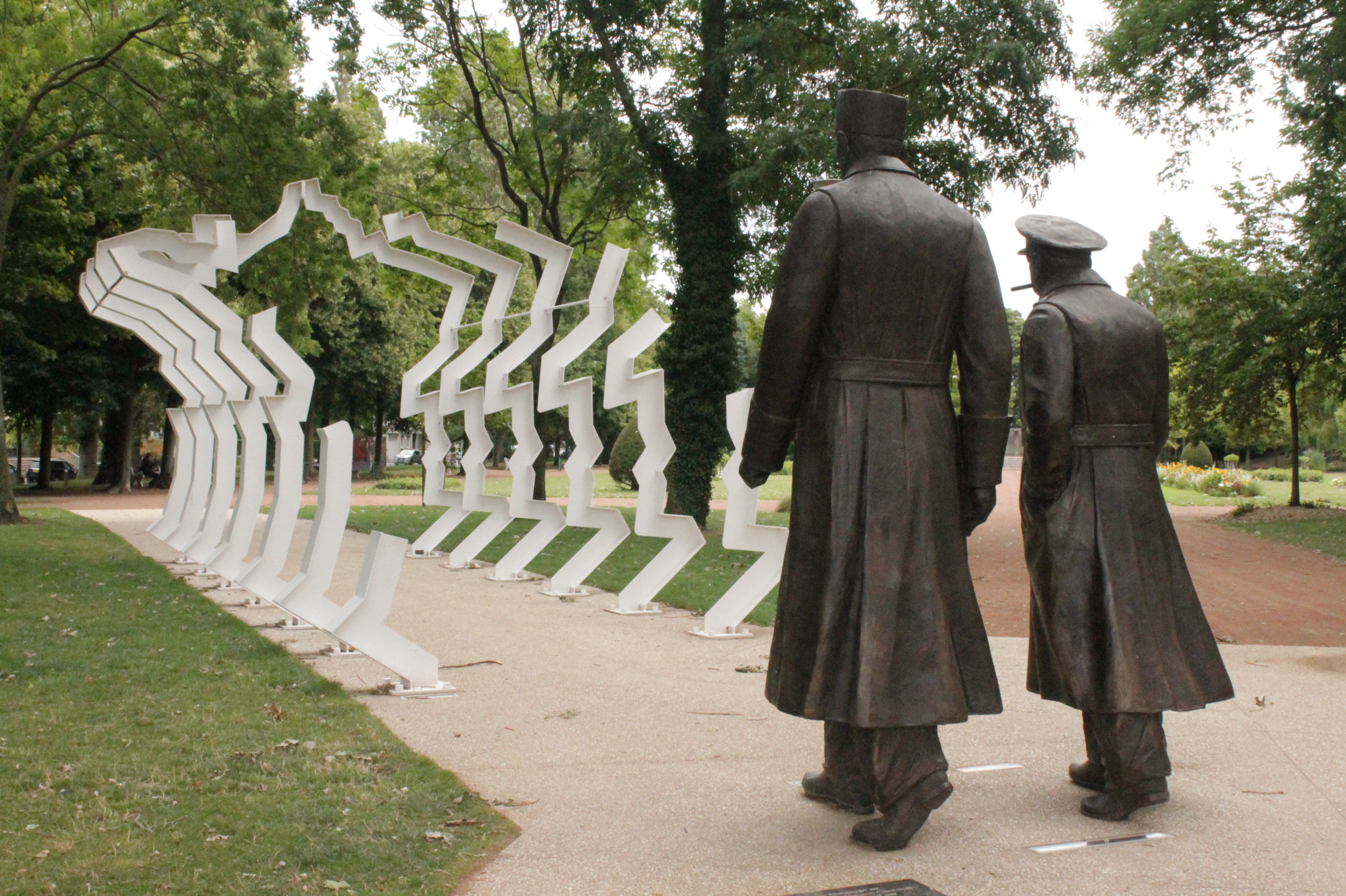
Monument to Charles de Gaulle and Winston Churchill in Calais

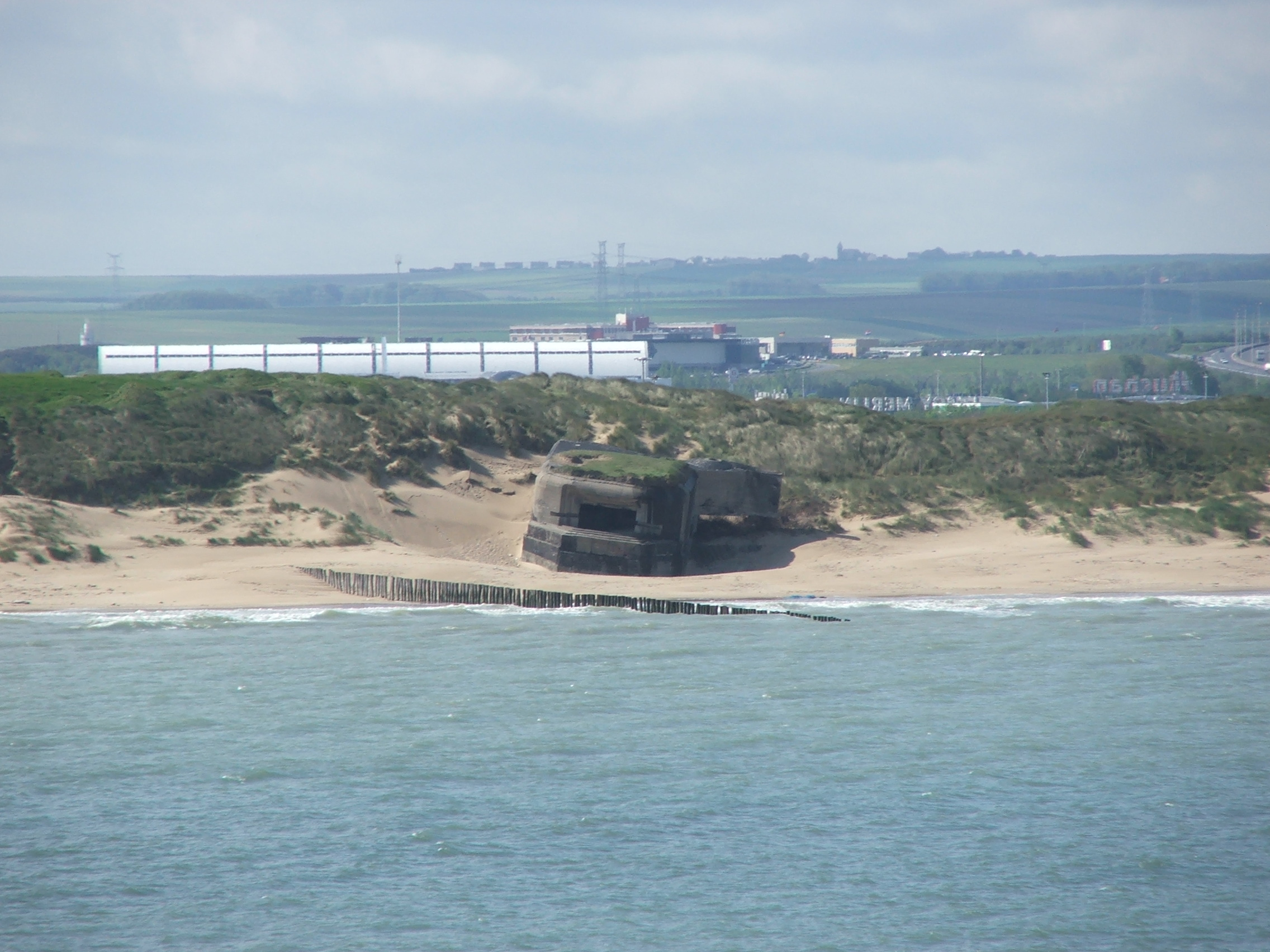
World War II bunkers at Calais

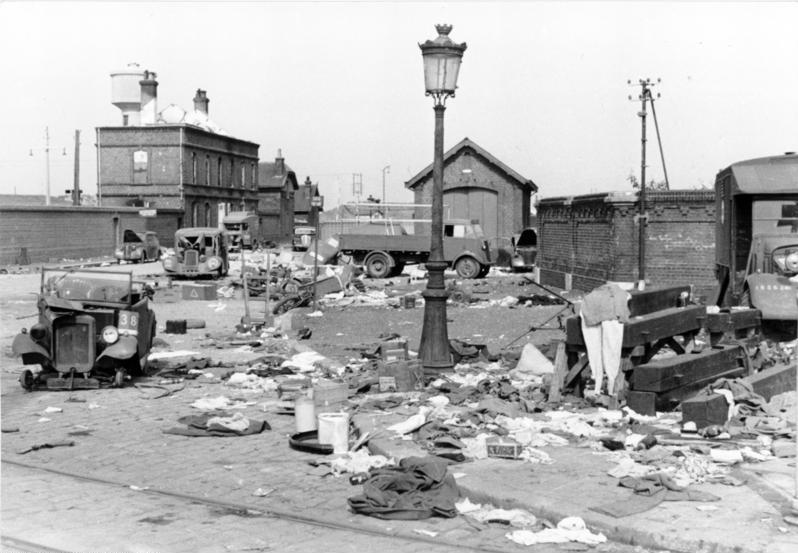
Debris from the siege of Calais

Calais was virtually razed to the ground during World War II. In May 1940, it was a key objective of the invading German forces and became the scene of a last-ditch defence—the siege of Calais—which diverted a sizable amount of German forces for several days immediately prior to the Battle of Dunkirk. A total of 3,000 British and 800 French troops, assisted by Royal Navy warships, held out from 22 to 27 May 1940 against the 10th Panzer Division. The town was flattened by artillery and precision dive bombing and only 30 of the 3800-strong defending force were evacuated before the town fell. This may have helped Operation Dynamo, the evacuation of Allied forces at Dunkirk, as 10th Panzer would have been involved on the Dunkirk perimeter had it not been busy at Calais. Between 26 May and 4 June 1940, some 330,000 Allied troops escaped from the Germans at Dunkirk.

During the ensuing German occupation, it became the command post for German forces in the Pas-de-Calais/Flanders region and was very heavily fortified, as the Germans generally believed that the Allies would invade there. It was also used as a launch site for V1 flying bombs and for much of the war, the Germans used the region as the site for railway guns to bombard the south-eastern corner of England. In 1943 they built massive bunkers along the coast in preparation for launching missiles on the southeast of England. Despite heavy preparations for defence against an amphibious assault, the Allied invasion took place well to the west in Normandy on D-Day. Calais was very heavily bombed and shelled in a successful effort to disrupt German communications and persuade them that the Allies would target the Pas-de-Calais for invasion (rather than Normandy). The town, by then largely in ruins, was laid siege to and liberated by General Daniel Spry's 3rd Canadian Infantry Division between 25 September and 1 October 1944. On 27 February 1945 Calais experienced its last bombing raid—this time by Royal Air Force bombers who mistook the town for Dunkirk, which was at that time still occupied by German forces. After the war there was little rebuilding of the historic city and most buildings were modern ones.

=== 21st century – migration issues ===
Since 1999 or earlier, an increasingly large number of illegal immigrants and asylum seekers started to arrive in the vicinity of Calais, living in the Calais jungle, the nickname given to a series of makeshift camps. The people lived there while attempting to enter the United Kingdom by stowing away on lorries, ferries, cars, or trains travelling through the Port of Calais or the Eurotunnel Calais Terminal, or while waiting for their French asylum claims to be processed. The people were a mix of asylum seekers and economic migrants from Darfur, Afghanistan, Syria, Iraq, Eritrea and other underdeveloped or conflict-stricken regions in Africa and Asia.

The Calais migrant crisis led to escalating tension between the UK and France in the summer of 2015. The UK blamed France for not doing enough to stop migrants from entering the Channel Tunnel or attempting to scale fences built along the border. The British Prime Minister David Cameron released a statement saying that illegal immigrants would be removed from the UK even if they reached the island. To discourage migrants and refugees from jumping on train shuttles at Calais, the UK government supplied fencing to be installed around the Eurotunnel complex, where the vehicles are loaded onto train shuttles in Calais.

On 26 October 2016, French authorities announced that the camp had been cleared. By January 2017, 500–1,000 migrants, mostly unaccompanied minors, had returned and were living rough in Calais and there has been a presence ever since.

== Geography and climate ==
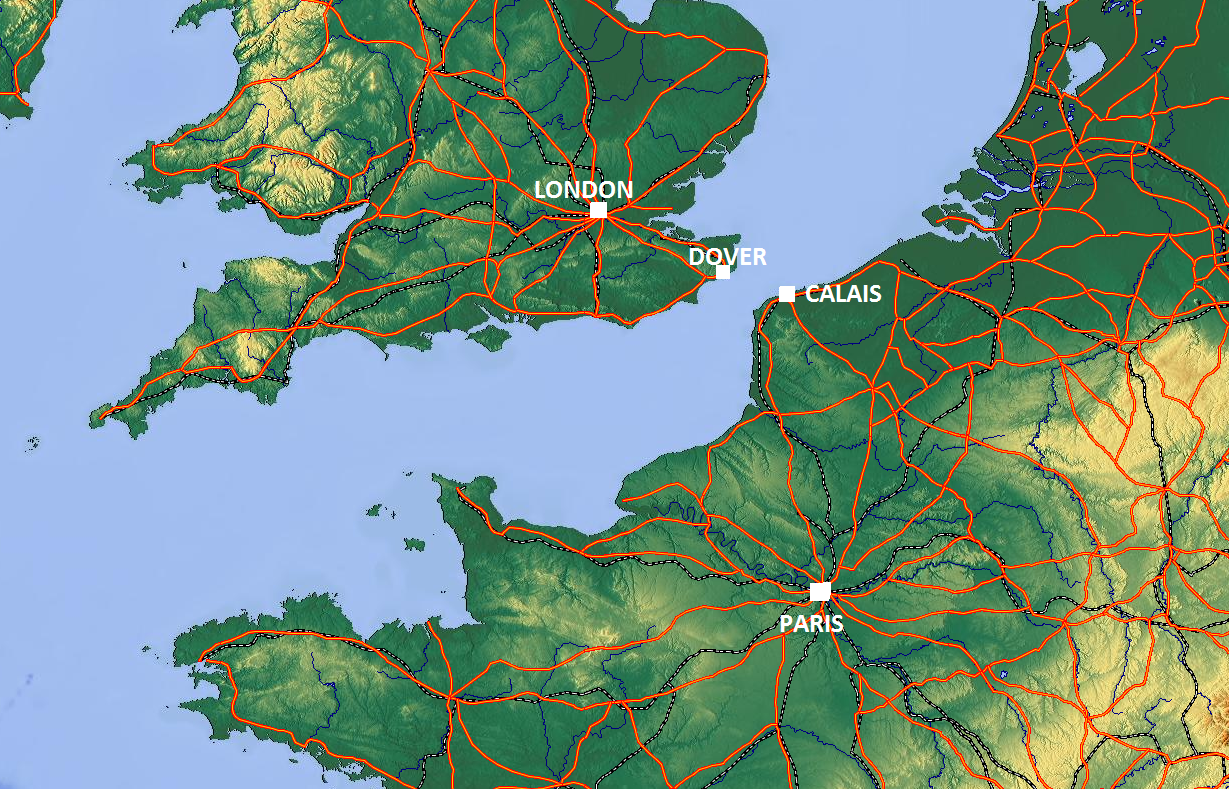
Map showing Calais in relation to Dover, London and Paris

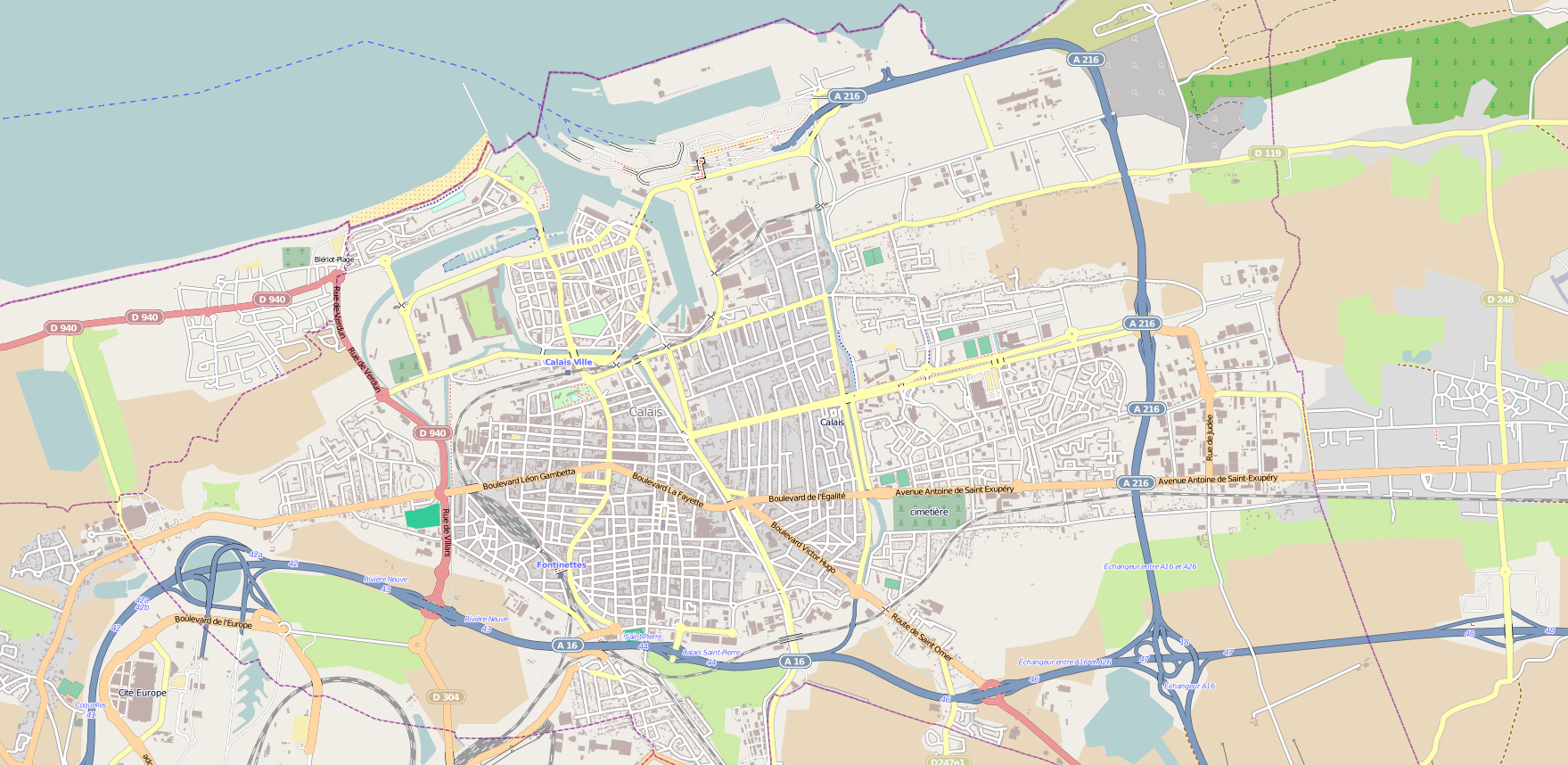
Map of Calais

Calais is located on the Pas de Calais, which marks the boundary between the English Channel and North Sea and located at the opposite end of the Channel Tunnel, 40 kilometres (25 miles) from Dover. On a clear day the White Cliffs of Dover can be viewed across the channel. Aside from being an important port and boarding point between France and England, it is at the nucleus of many major railway and highway networks and connected by road to Arras, Lens, Béthune and St. Omer. Dunkirk is located about 37 km (23 mi) to the east. Calais is located 236 km (147 mi) north of the French capital of Paris, or around 295 km (183 mi) by car. The commune of Calais is bordered by the English channel to the north, Sangatte and Coquelles to the west, Coulogne to the south and Marck to the east. The core area of the city is divided into the Old Town area within the old city walls, and the younger suburbs of St. Pierre, which are connected by a boulevard.

Calais is part of the Côte d'Opale (Opal Coast), a cliff-lined section of northern French coast that parallels the white cliffs on the British coast and is part of the same geological formation. It is known for its scenic cliffs such as Cape Blanc Nez and Cape Gris Nez and for its wide area of dunes. Many artists have been inspired by its landscapes, among them the composer Henri Dutilleux, the writers Victor Hugo and Charles Dickens, and the painters J. M. W. Turner, Carolus-Duran, Maurice Boitel and Eugène Boudin. It was the painter Édouard Lévêque who coined the name for this area in 1911 to describe the distinctive quality of its light.

Calais has a temperate oceanic climate (Cfb in the Köppen climate classification). Temperature ranges are moderate and the winters are cool with unstable weather. It rains on average about 700 to 800 mm (28 to 31 in) per year.

Climate data for Calais - Marck (CQF), elevation: 2 m (6.6 ft) (1991-2020 normals, extremes 1991-present)
Month	Jan	Feb	Mar	Apr	May	Jun	Jul	Aug	Sep	Oct	Nov	Dec	Year
Record high °C (°F)	17.3 (63.1)	19.6 (67.3)	23.6 (74.5)	25.5 (77.9)	32.1 (89.8)	34.0 (93.2)	39.9 (103.8)	35.7 (96.3)	32.6 (90.7)	27.6 (81.7)	20.2 (68.4)	17.0 (62.6)	39.9 (103.8)
Mean daily maximum °C (°F)	7.6 (45.7)	8.2 (46.8)	10.5 (50.9)	13.6 (56.5)	16.6 (61.9)	19.4 (66.9)	21.8 (71.2)	22.2 (72.0)	19.5 (67.1)	15.6 (60.1)	11.1 (52.0)	8.1 (46.6)	14.5 (58.1)
Daily mean °C (°F)	5.1 (41.2)	5.5 (41.9)	7.2 (45.0)	9.6 (49.3)	12.5 (54.5)	15.3 (59.5)	17.6 (63.7)	17.9 (64.2)	15.4 (59.7)	12.2 (54.0)	8.4 (47.1)	5.7 (42.3)	11.0 (51.8)
Mean daily minimum °C (°F)	2.7 (36.9)	2.7 (36.9)	3.9 (39.0)	5.5 (41.9)	8.5 (47.3)	11.3 (52.3)	13.5 (56.3)	13.6 (56.5)	11.4 (52.5)	8.8 (47.8)	5.7 (42.3)	3.3 (37.9)	7.6 (45.7)
Record low °C (°F)	−14.0 (6.8)	−11.3 (11.7)	−5.9 (21.4)	−5.0 (23.0)	−0.5 (31.1)	3.3 (37.9)	4.9 (40.8)	5.6 (42.1)	0.9 (33.6)	−5.7 (21.7)	−7.1 (19.2)	−13.2 (8.2)	−14.0 (6.8)
Average precipitation mm (inches)	59.5 (2.34)	47.2 (1.86)	40.2 (1.58)	37.9 (1.49)	49.6 (1.95)	51.6 (2.03)	54.7 (2.15)	67.1 (2.64)	62.9 (2.48)	91.0 (3.58)	92.4 (3.64)	83.0 (3.27)	737.1 (29.02)
Average precipitation days (≥ 1.0 mm)	11.6	9.7	8.5	8.1	8.6	8.5	8.3	8.9	9.7	12.5	13.1	12.9	120.5
Mean monthly sunshine hours	69.4	100.5	140.5	213.7	226.7	227.7	239.3	213.8	173.8	114.6	75.8	65.1	1,860.9
Source 1: Meteociel
Source 2: Infoclimat (sunshine hours)

The commune of Calais is divided into 13 quartiers:

- Beau Marais
- Cailloux
- Calais-nord
- Quartier du Courgain Maritime
- Fontinettes
- Fort-Nieulay
- Gambetta
- Nouvelle-France
- Mi-voix
- Petit Courgain
- Plage
- Pont-du-Leu
- Saint-Pierre

== Demographics ==
Changes in the number of inhabitants is known throughout the population censuses conducted since 1793 in Calais. Note the massive growth in population from 13,529 in 1881 to 58,969 in 1886, a growth of 335.9%; this is because the city of Saint-Pierre-lès-Calais merged with Calais in 1885. According to the INSEE census of 2017, Calais has 73,911 people (a decrease of 4.4% from 1999). The town's population ranked 60th nationally, down from 53rd in 1999.

Historical population

Year	Pop.	±% p.a.
1793	6,549	—
1800	6,996	+0.95%
1806	8,102	+2.48%
1821	8,854	+0.59%
1831	10,437	+1.66%
1836	10,865	+0.81%
1841	12,508	+2.86%
1846	11,444	−1.76%
1851	10,993	−0.80%
1856	11,969	+1.72%
1861	12,934	+1.56%
1866	12,727	−0.32%
1872	12,843	+0.15%

Year	Pop.	±% p.a.
1876	12,573	−0.53%
1881	13,529	+1.48%
1886	58,969	+34.24%
1891	56,867	−0.72%
1896	56,940	+0.03%
1901	59,743	+0.97%
1906	66,627	+2.21%
1911	72,322	+1.65%
1921	73,001	+0.09%
1926	71,629	−0.38%
1931	70,213	−0.40%
1936	67,568	−0.77%
1946	50,048	−2.96%

Year	Pop.	±% p.a.
1954	60,340	+2.37%
1962	70,372	+1.94%
1968	74,624	+0.98%
1975	78,820	+0.78%
1982	76,527	−0.42%
1990	75,309	−0.20%
1999	77,317	+0.29%
2007	75,293	−0.33%
2012	72,589	−0.73%
2017	73,911	+0.36%
2023	67,571	−1.48%

Source: EHESS and INSEE

== Economy ==
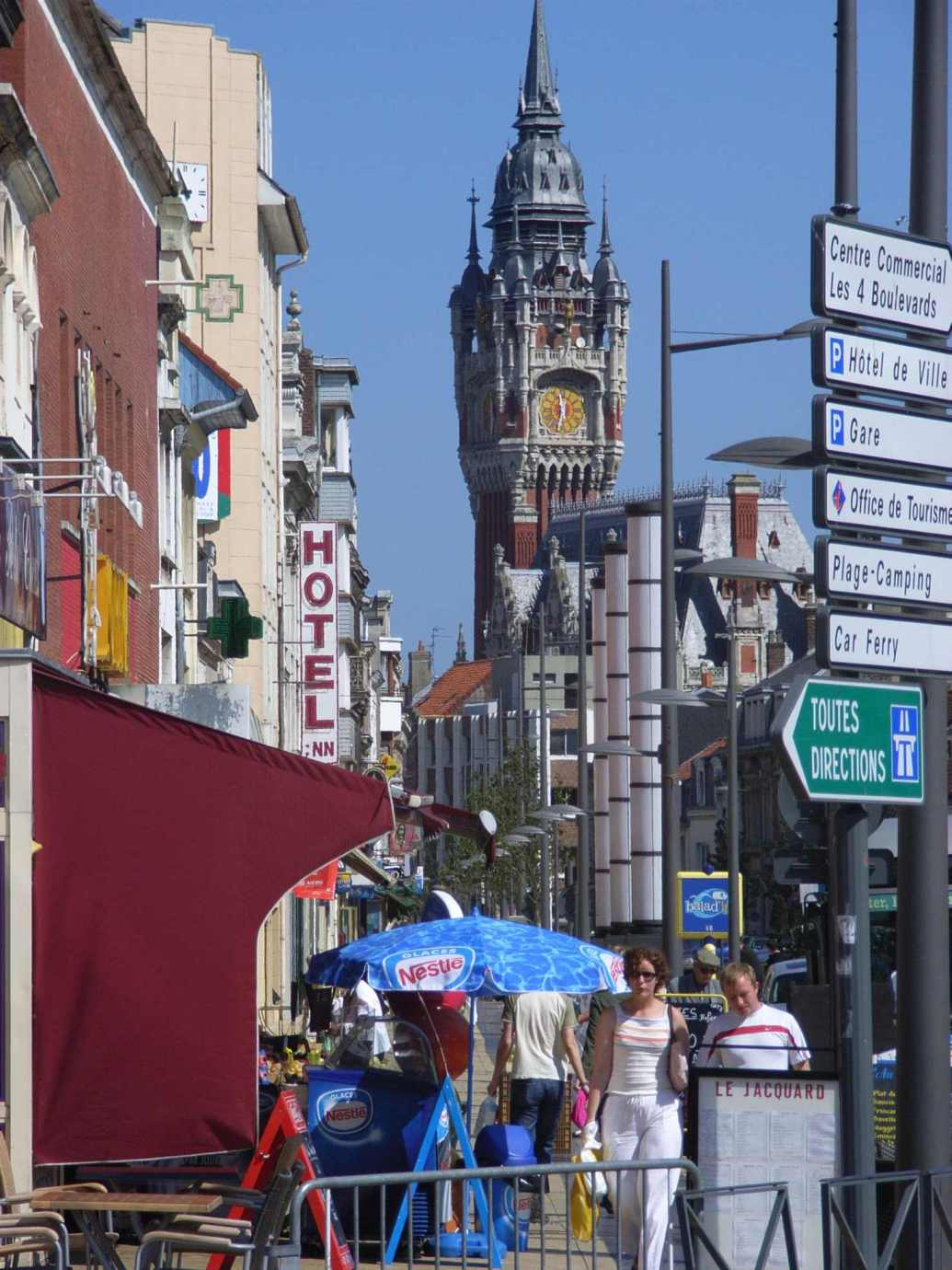
Town centre

The city's proximity to England has made it a major port for centuries. It is the principal ferry crossing point between England and France, with the vast majority of Channel crossings being made between Dover and Calais. Companies operating from Calais include(d) SeaFrance (1996–2012), DFDS Seaways, and P&O Ferries. The French end of the Channel Tunnel is situated in the vicinity of Calais, in Coquelles some 4 miles (6.4 km) to the west of the town. Calais possesses direct rail links to Paris, 148 miles (238 km) to the south. More than 10 million people visit Calais annually.

From medieval times, English companies thrived in Calais. Calais was a particularly important centre in the production and trade of wool and cloth, which outweighed the costs of maintaining the town as part of England. In 1830 some 113 manufacturers were based in Calais and the St Pierre suburbs, the majority of which were English. There are still two major lace factories in Calais with around 700 looms and 3000 employees. The town exports in the early 20th century were lace, chemicals, paper, wines, especially champagne, spirits, hay, straw, wool, potatoes, woven goods, fruit, glass-ware, lace and metal-ware. Principal imports in the early 20th century included cotton and silk goods, coal, iron and steel, petroleum, timber, raw wool, cotton yarn and cork. During the five years 1901–1905 the average annual value of exports was £8,388,000 (£6,363,000 in the years 1896–1900), of imports £4,145,000 (£3,759,000 in 1896–1900).

As a fishing port, Calais has several notable fishing markets including Les Délices de la Mer and Huîtrière Calaisenne on the Boulevard La Fayette, the latter of which is noted for its oysters, lobster and crabs from Brittany. The Emile Fournier et Fils market on the Rue Mouron sells mainly smoked fish including salmon, trout, herring and halibut.

== Politics ==
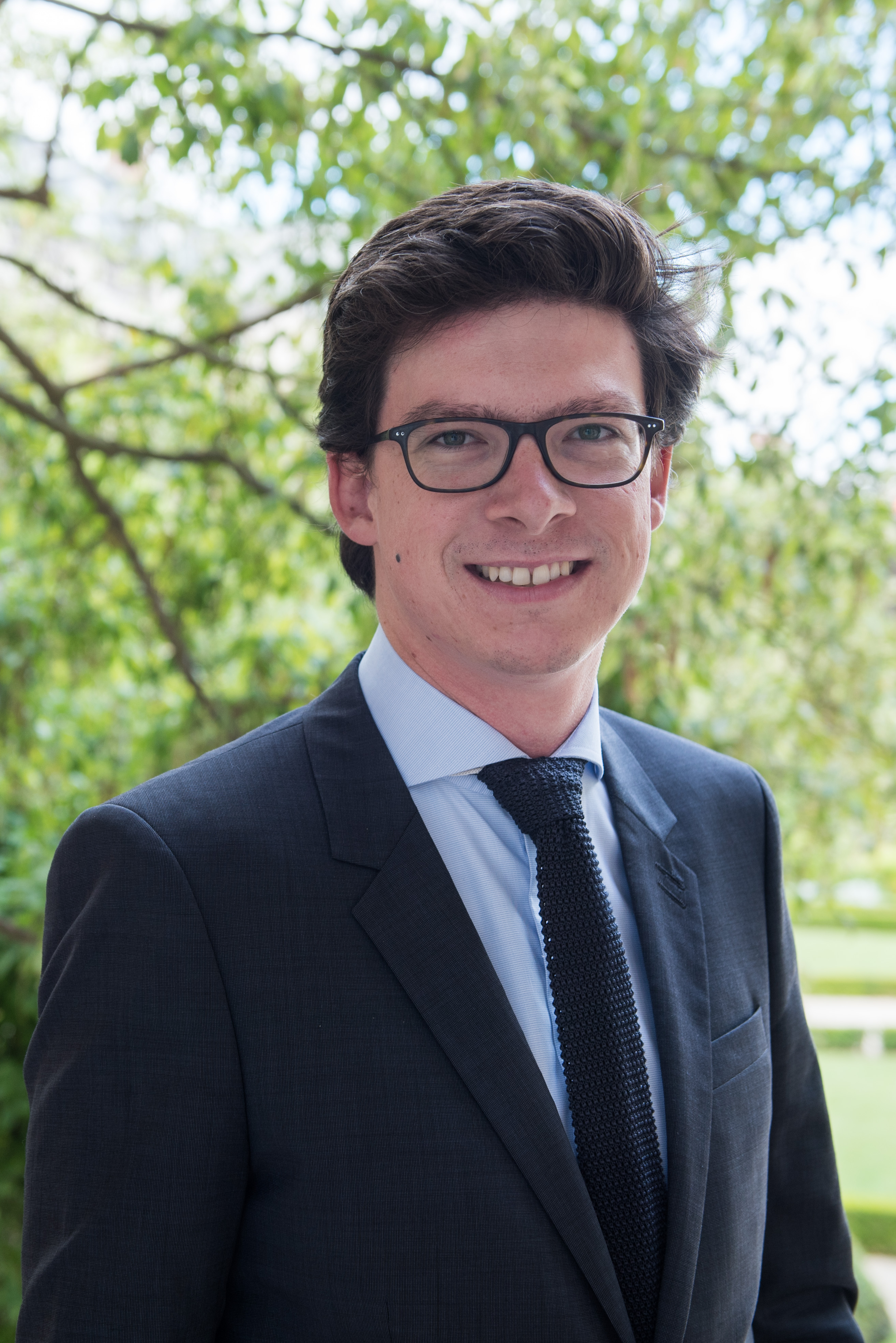
Pierre-Henri Dumont, MP for Calais (2017–2024)

Calais is part of Pas-de-Calais's 7th constituency for the National Assembly; the current deputy is Marc de Fleurian of the National Rally, who ousted Pierre-Henri Dumont of The Republicans at the 2024 election.

For elections to the Pas-de-Calais departmental council, the commune of Calais is divided between the cantons of Calais-1, Calais-2, and Calais-3, the first two of which also contain adjoining communes.

The mayor of Calais has been Natacha Bouchart since 2008, first for the Union for a Popular Movement and then its successor The Republicans. From 1971 to 2008, the mayor was a member of the French Communist Party (PCF): Jean-Jacques Barthe (1971–2000) and Jacky Hénin (2000–2008).

== Notable landmarks ==
=== Place d'Armes ===
Place d'Armes is one of the largest squares in the city of Calais. It adjoins the watchtower, and during medieval times was once the heart of the city. While Calais was a territory of England (1347–1558), it became known as Market Square (place du Marché). Only at the end of English rule did it take the name of Place d'Armes. After the reconquest of Calais in 1558 by Francis, Duke of Guise, Francis II gave Calais the right to hold a fair twice a year on the square, which still exists today, as well as a bustling Wednesday and Saturday market.

=== Hôtel de Ville ===
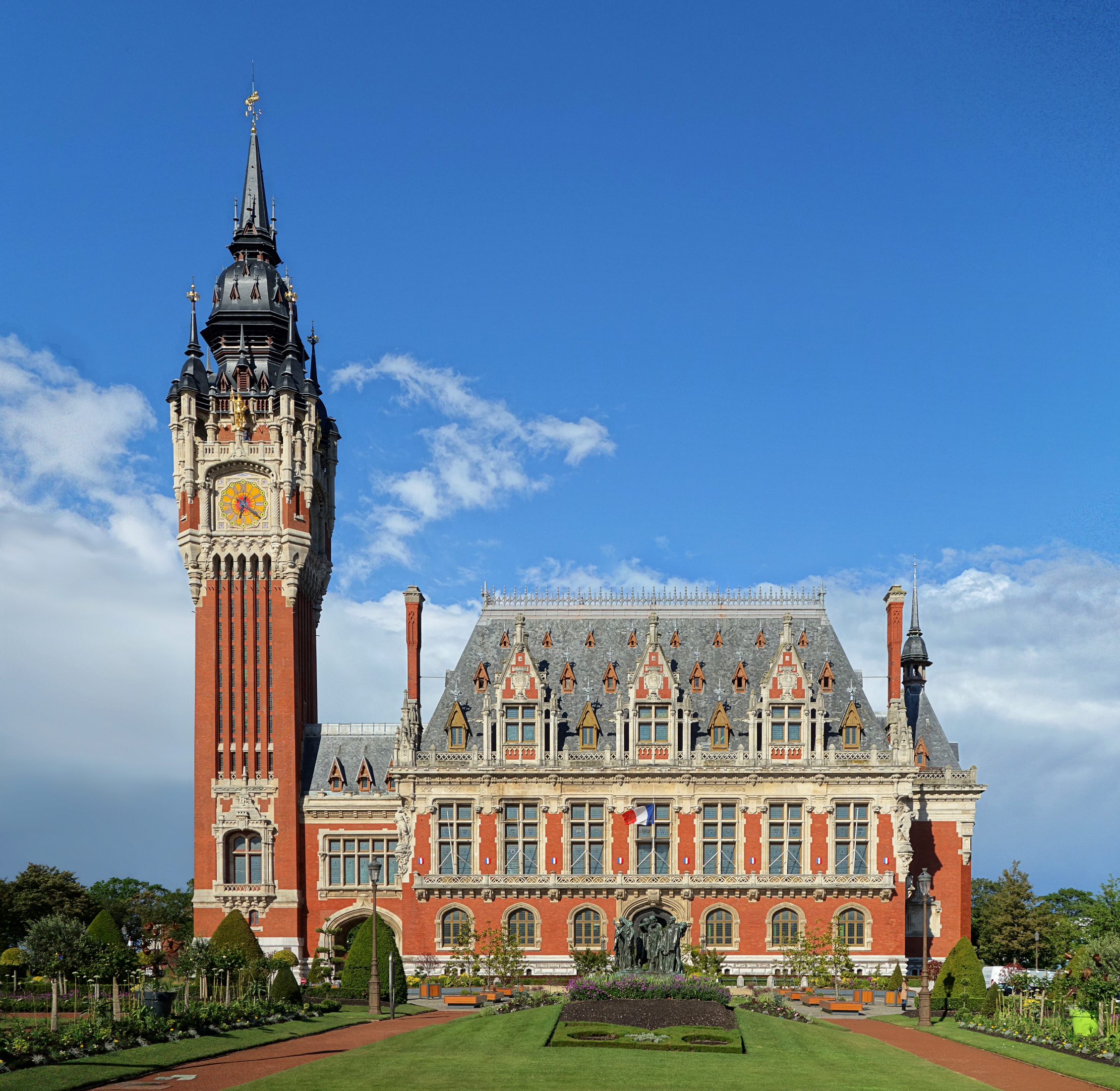
Hôtel de Ville

The town centre, which has seen significant regeneration over the past decade, is dominated by its distinctive town hall (Hôtel de Ville) at Place du Soldat Inconnu. It was built in the Flemish Renaissance style between 1911 and 1925 to commemorate the unification of the cities of Calais and Saint Pierre in 1885. An extra terrace had been erected at the previous town hall in 1818. One of the most elegant landmarks in the city, its ornate 74-metre (246 ft) high clock tower and belfry can be seen from out to sea and chimes throughout the day and has been protected by UNESCO since 2005 as part of a series of belfries across the region. The building parts have also been listed as a series of historic monuments by government decree of 26 June 2003, including its roofs and belfry, main hall, glass roof, the staircase, corridor serving the first floor, the rooms on the first floor (including decoration): the wedding room, the VIP lounge, the lounge of the council and the cabinet room. The hall has stained glass windows and numerous paintings and exquisite decor. It houses police offices.

=== Église Notre-Dame ===
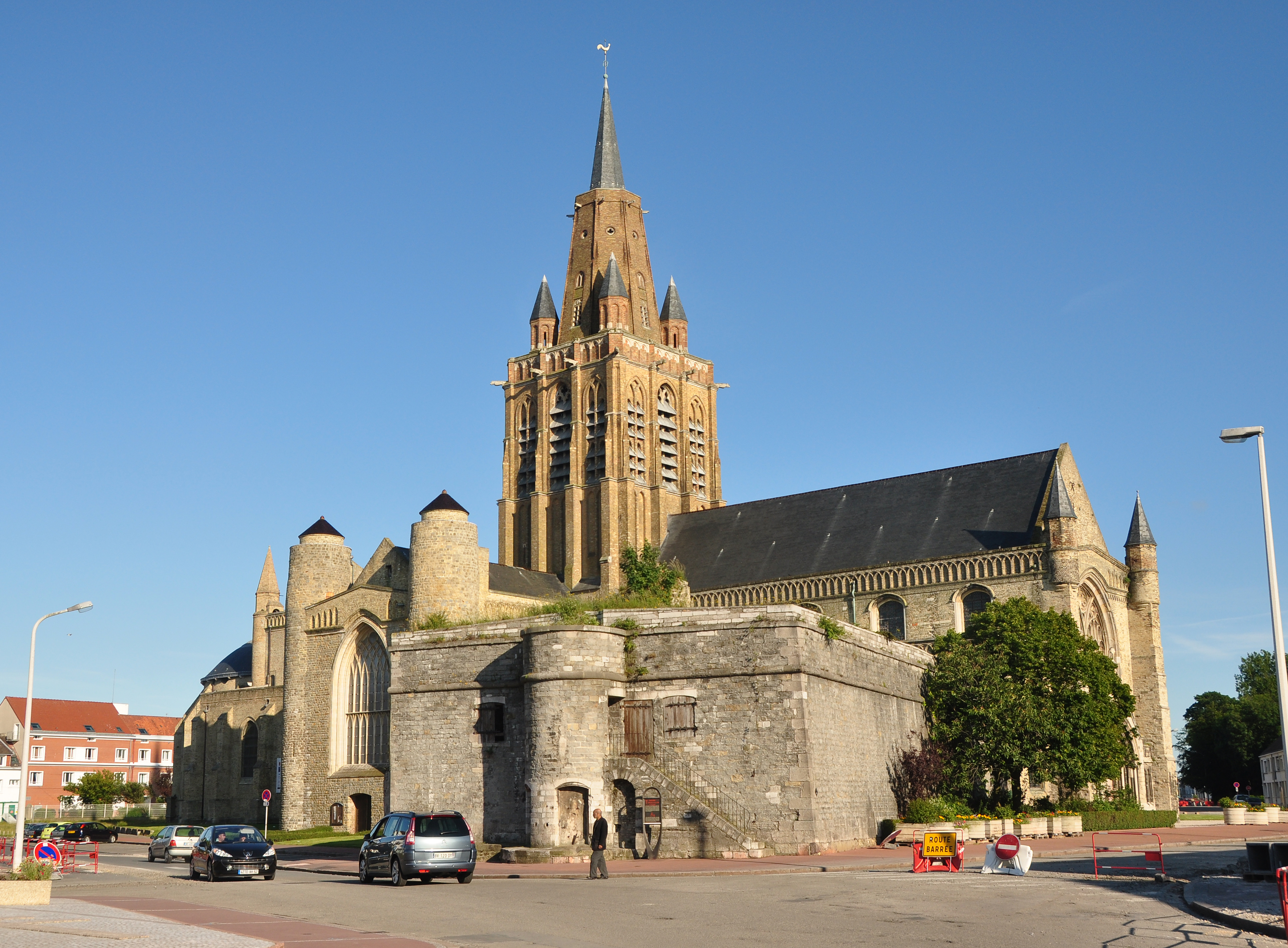
Église Notre-Dame

Église Notre-Dame is a great church which was originally built in the late 13th century and its tower was added in the late 14th or early 15th century. Like the town hall it is one of the city's most prominent landmarks. It was arguably the only church in the English perpendicular style in France. Much of the current 1,400-capacity church dates to 1631–1635. It contains elements of Flemish, Gothic, Anglo-Norman and Tudor architecture. In 1691, an 1,800-cubic-metre (64,000 cu ft) cistern was added to the church by order of Vauban. The church is dedicated to the Virgin, and built in the form of a cross, consisting of a nave and four aisles— The old grand altar dated to 1628 and was built from Carrara marble wrecked on the coast, during its transit from Genoa to Antwerp. It contained eighteen figures, the two standing on either side of the altarpiece—representing St. Louis and Charlemagne. The organ—of a deep and mellow tone, and highly ornamented by figures in relief—was built at Canterbury sometime around 1700. The pulpit and reading-desk, richly sculptured in oak, is another well-executed piece of ecclesiastical workmanship from St. Omer. The altarpiece, the Assumption, was often attributed to Anthony van Dyck, though in reality it is by Gerard Seghers; whilst the painting over the side altar, once believed to be by Peter Paul Rubens is in fact by Pieter Van Mol. A high and strongly built wall, partaking more of the fortress than a cathedral in its aspect, flanks the building, and protects it from the street where the old river formerly ran, in its course through Calais to the sea.

The square, massive Norman tower has three-arched belfry windows on each face, surmounted by corner turrets, and a conically shaped tower of octagonal proportions, topped again by a short steeple. The tower was a main viewing point for the Anglo-French Survey (1784–1790) which linked the Paris Observatory with the Royal Greenwich Observatory using trigonometry. Cross-channel sightings were made of signal lights at Dover Castle and Fairlight, East Sussex.

The church was assigned as a historic monument by decree of 10 September 1913, only to have its stained glass smashed during a Zeppelin bombardment on 15 January 1915, falling through the roof. General de Gaulle married Yvonne Vendroux on 6 April 1921 at the cathedral. The building sustained extensive damage during World War II, and was partially rebuilt, although much of the old altar and furnishings were not replaced.

=== Towers ===
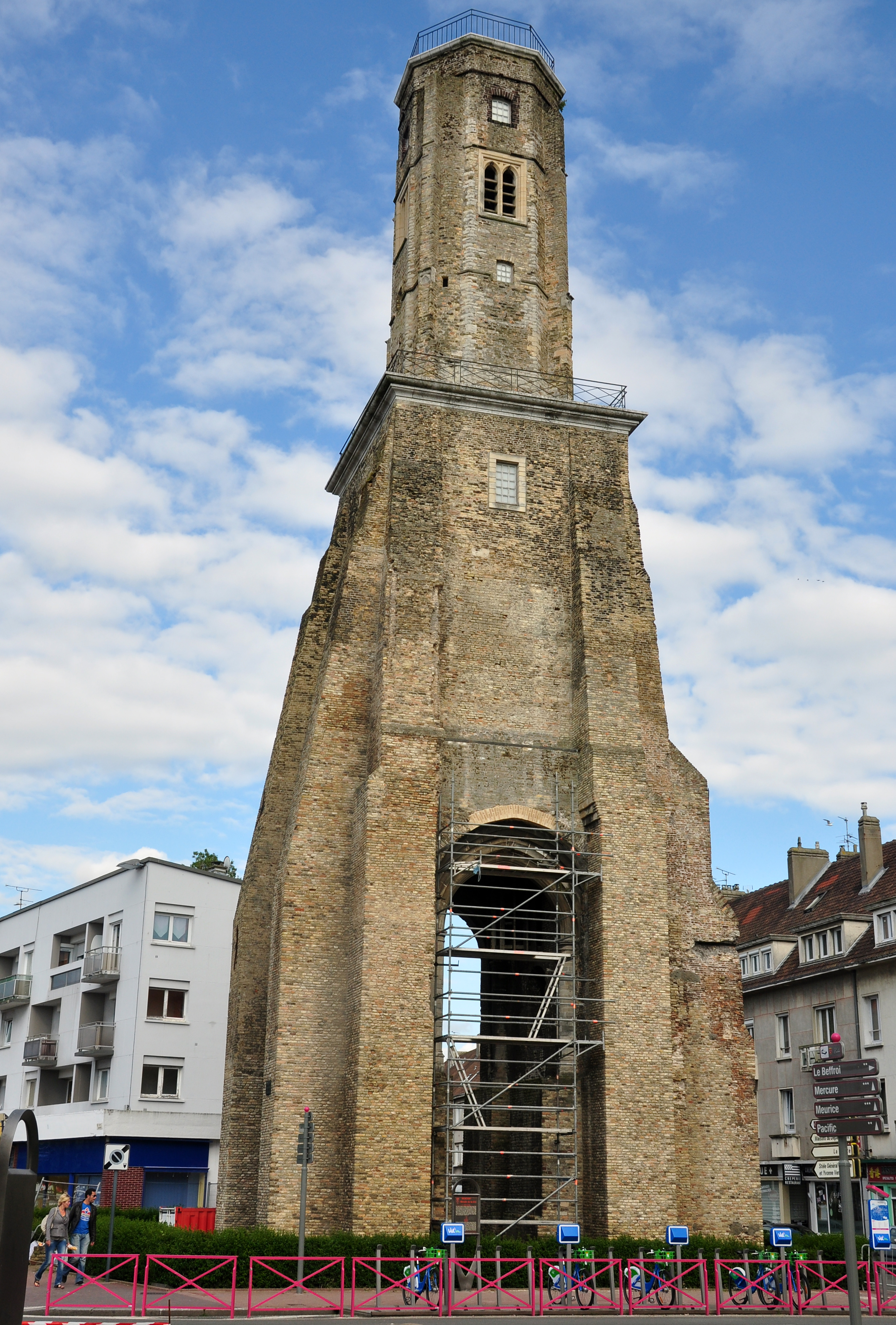
Tour du Guet

The Tour du Guet (Watch Tower), situated in Calais Nord on the Places d'Armes, is one of the few surviving pre-war buildings. Dating from 1229, when Philip I, Count of Boulogne, built the fortifications of Calais, it is one of the oldest monuments of Calais, although the oldest remaining traces date to 1302. It has a height of 35–39 metres or 115–128 feet (sources differ). An earthquake in 1580 split the tower in two, and at one time it threatened to collapse completely. The tower was repaired in 1606, and then had the purpose of serving as a hall to accommodate the merchants of Calais. It was damaged in 1658 when a young stable boy set fire to it, while it was temporarily being used as royal stables during a visit of King Louis XIV. It was not repaired for some 30 years. In 1770, a bell identical to the original bell of 1348 was cast. Due to its height, from the late 17th century it became an important watchout post for the city for centuries until 1905; the last keeper of the tower was forced to leave in 1926. Abraham Chappe (a brother of Ignace Chappe) installed a telegraph office in the tower in 1816 and operated for 32 years. It was this office which announced the death of Napoleon I to the French public in 1821. It also had the dual function as lighthouse with a rotating beacon fuelled by oil from 1818. The lantern was finally replaced by a new lighthouse on 15 October 1848. During the First World War, it served as a military observation post and narrowly missed destruction during World War II. This tower has been classified as a historic monument since 6 November 1931.

The Calais Lighthouse (Le phare de Calais) was built in 1848, replacing the old watch tower as the lighthouse of the port. The 55-metre-high (180 ft) tower was electrified in 1883 and automated in 1992. The staircase has 271 steps leading up to the lantern. By day it is easily distinguishable from other coastal lighthouses by its white color and black lantern. The lighthouse was classified as a historical monument on 22 November 2010.

=== Forts ===
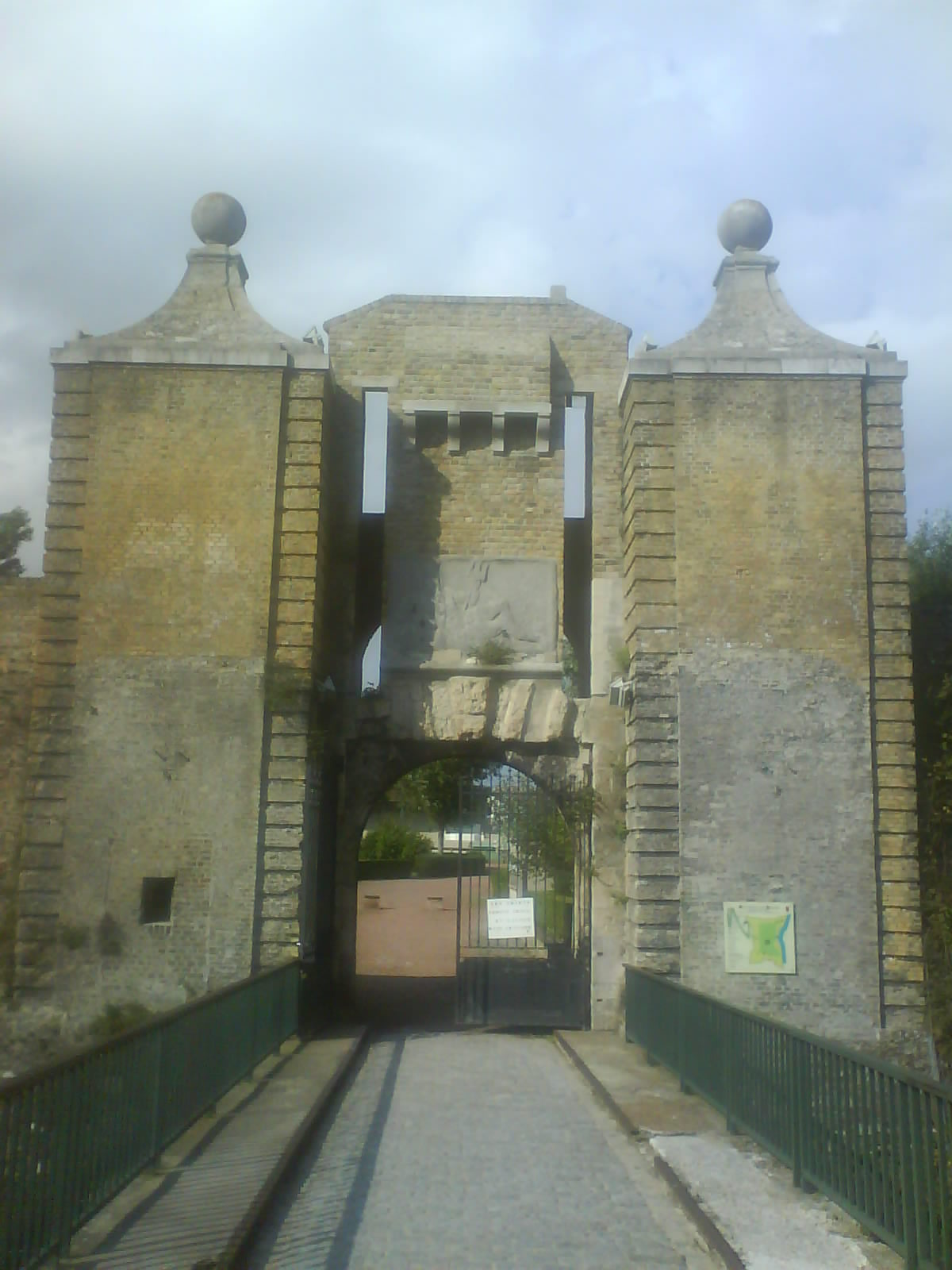
The Citadel of Calais

The Citadel, located on the Avenue Pierre Coubertin, was built between 1560 and 1571 on the site of a former medieval castle which was built in 1229 by Philippe de Hureprel. The purpose of its construction was to fend off would-be invaders, but it wasn't long until the city was successfully invaded by Archduke Albert of Austria on 24 April 1596. Both Louis XIII and Cardinal Richelieu at one time considered expanding the citadel and Calais into a great walled city for military harbour purposes but the proposals came to nothing.

Fort Risban, located on the coast on the Avenue Raymond Poincaré at the port entrance, was built by the English to prevent supplies reaching Calais by sea during the siege in November 1346 and continued to be occupied by them until 1558 when Calais was restored to France. In 1596, the fort was captured by the Spanish Netherlands until May 1598 when it was returned to the French following the Treaty of Vervins. It was rebuilt in 1640. Vauban, who visited the fort some time in the 1680s, described it as "a home for owls, and place to hold the Sabbath" rather than a fortification. During World War II it served as an air raid shelter. It contains the Lancaster Tower, a name often given to the fort itself.

Fort Nieulay, located along the Avenue Roger Salengro originally dated to the 12th or 13th century. During the English invasion in 1346, sluices gates were added as water defences and a fort was built up around it in 1525 on the principle that the people of the fort could defend the town by flooding it. In April and May 1677, Louis XIV and Vauban visited Calais and ordered a complete rebuilding of Fort Nieulay. It was completed in 1679, with the purpose to protect the bridge of Nieulay crossing the Hames River. By 1815 the fort had fallen into a ruined state and it wasn't until 1903 that it was sold and improved by its farmer tenants. The fort was briefly the site of a low-key scuffle with Germans in May 1940.

=== Museums, theatres and cultural centres ===
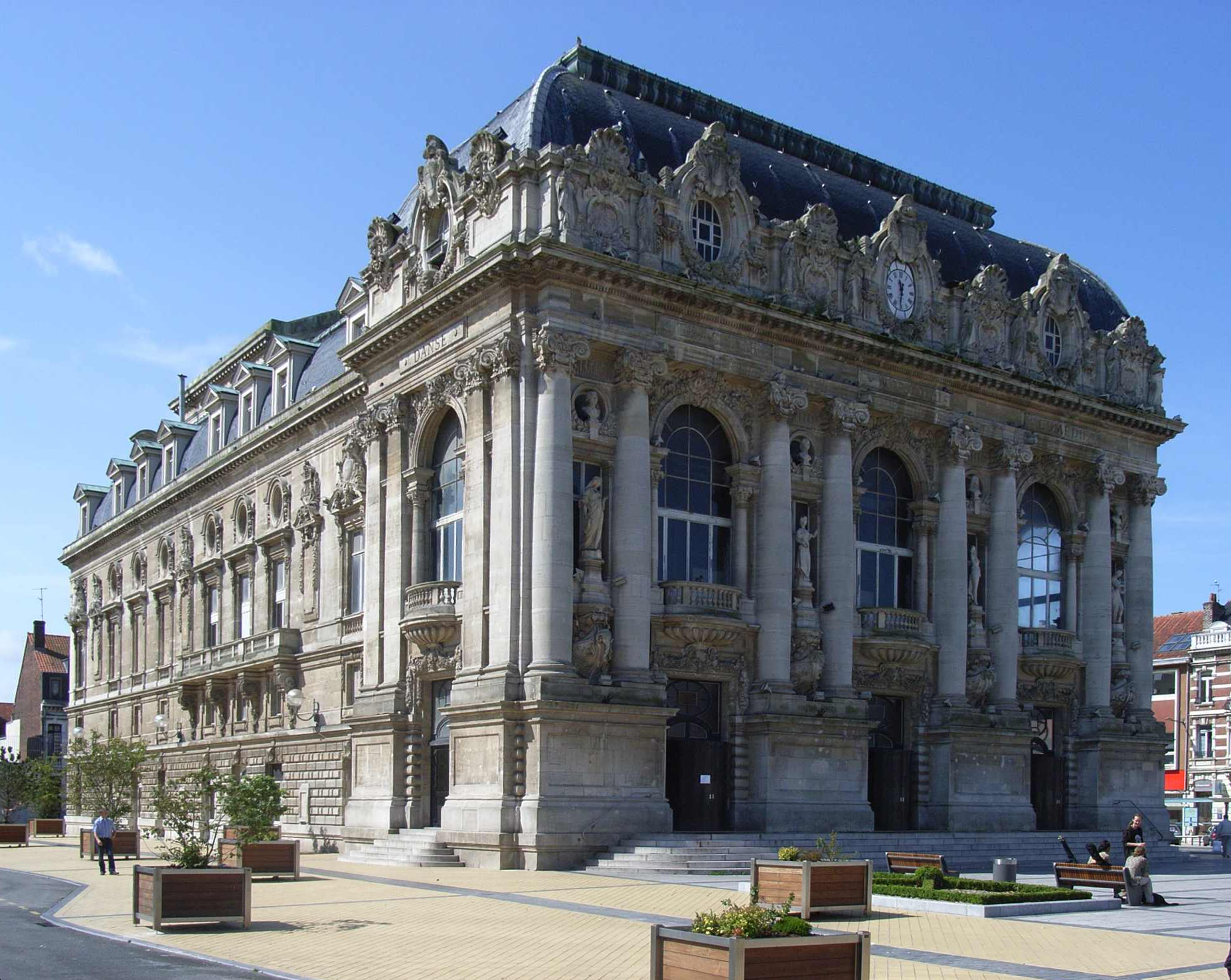
Calais Theatre

Calais contains several museums. These include the Musée des Beaux-Arts et de la Dentelle de Calais, Cité internationale de la Dentelle et de la Mode de Calais and the Musée de la Seconde Guerre Mondiale (World War II museum). Cité internationale de la Dentelle et de la Mode de Calais is a lace and fashion museum located in an old Boulart factory on the canalside and contains workshops, a library and a restaurant and regularly puts on fashion shows. The World War II museum is located at Parc St Pierre opposite the town hall and south of the train station. The building is a former Nazi bunker and wartime military headquarters, built in 1941 by the Todt Organisation. The 194-metre-long (636 ft) structure contains twenty rooms with relics and photographs related to World War II, and one room dedicated to World War I.

Theatres and cultural centres include Le théâtre municipal, Le Centre Culturel Gérard Philipe, Le Conservatoire à rayonnement départemental (CRD), L'auditorium Didier Lockwood, L'École d'Art de Calais, Le Channel, Le Cinéma Alhambra and La Médiathèque municipale. Le théâtre municipal or Calais Theatre is located on the Boulevard Lafayette and was built in 1903 on a plot of land which was used as a cemetery between 1811 and 1871. The theatre opened in 1905. On the first floor of the façade are statues which represent the performing arts subjects of Poetry, Comedy, Dance and Music.

=== Monuments and memorials ===
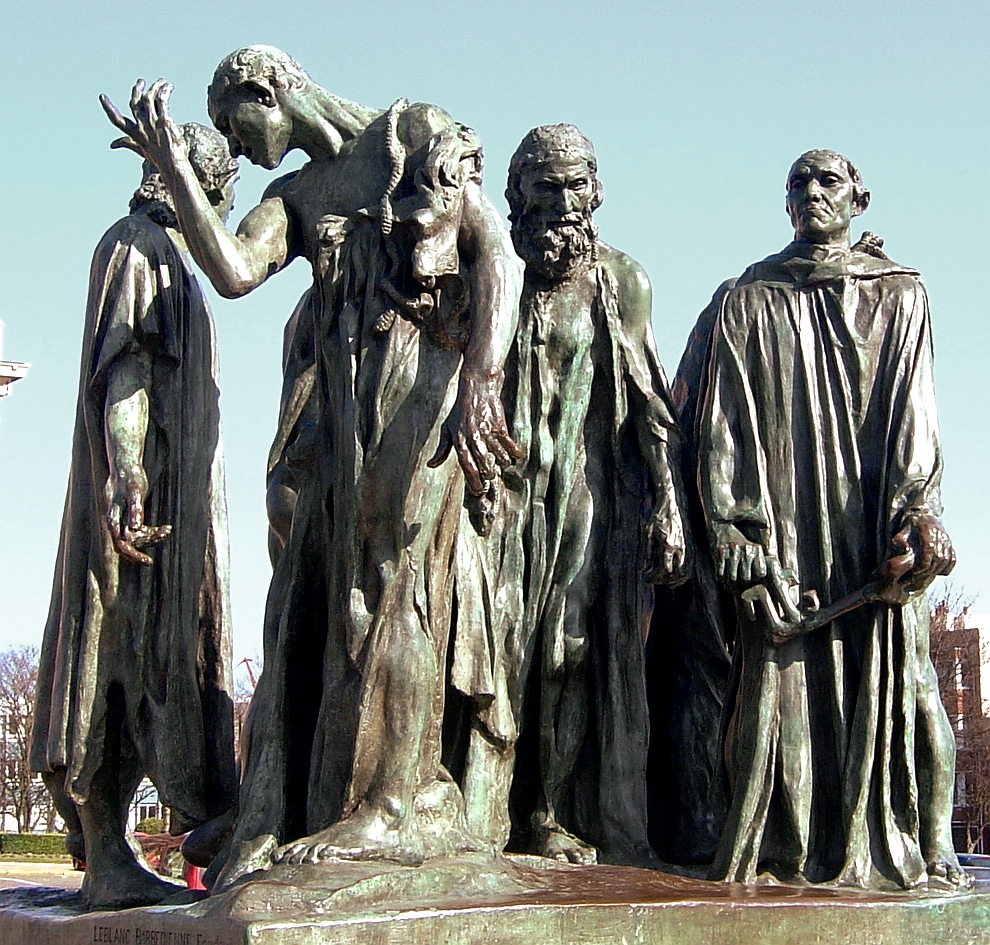
The Burghers of Calais

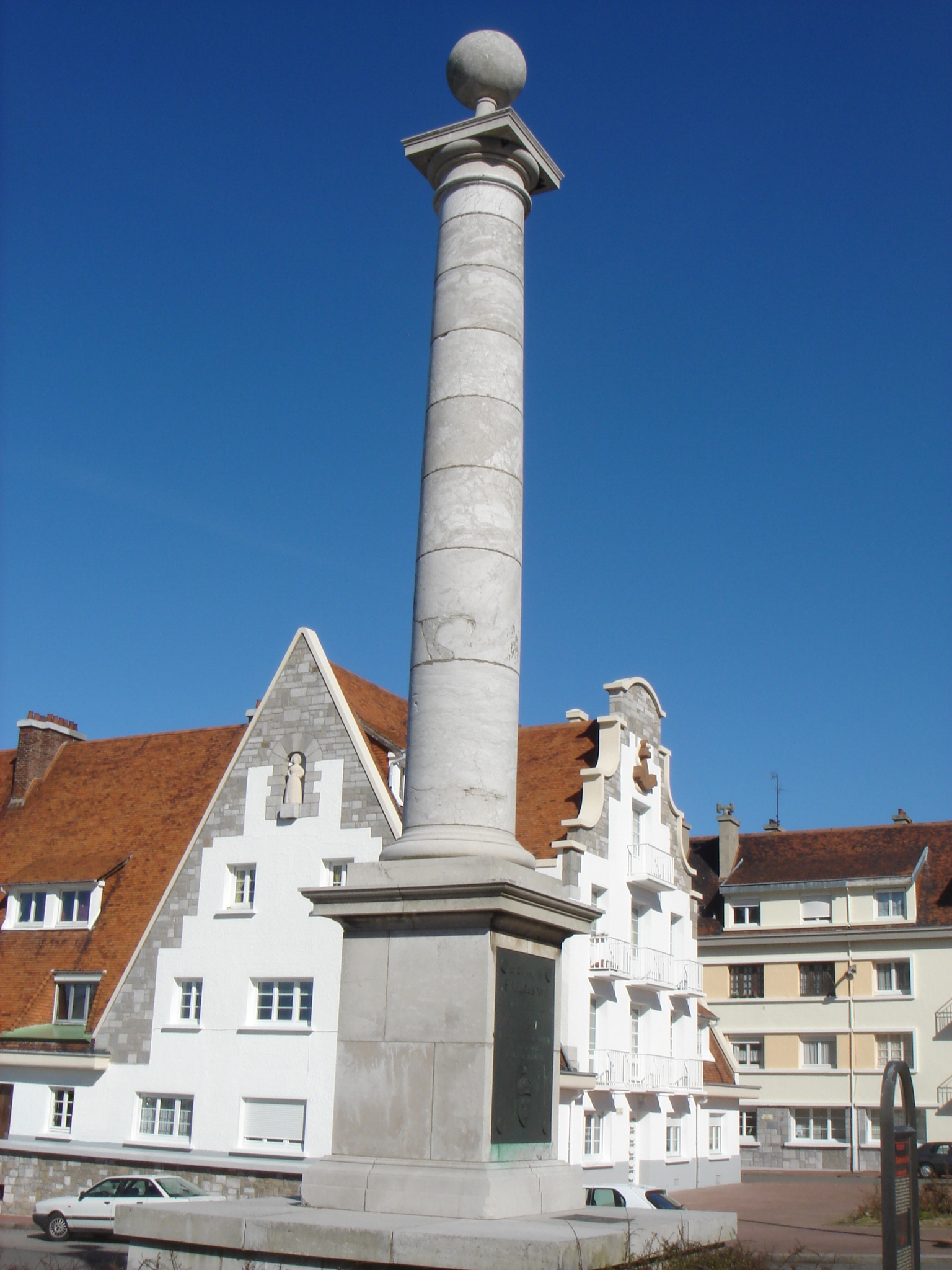
Louis XVIII column

Directly in front of the town hall is a bronze cast of Les Bourgeois de Calais ("The Burghers of Calais"), a sculpture by Auguste Rodin to commemorate six men who were to have been executed by Edward III in 1347. The cast was erected in 1895, funded by a public grant of 10,000 francs. Rodin (who based his design on a fourteenth-century account by Jean Froissart) intended to evoke the viewer's sympathy by emphasizing the pained expressions of the faces of the six men about to be executed.

The Monument des Sauveteurs ("Rescuers' Monument") was installed in 1899 on Boulevard des Alliés, and transferred to the Quartier of Courgain in 1960. It is a bronze sculpture, attributed to Edward Lormier. The Monument Le Pluviôse is a 620 kg (1,367 lb) bronze monument built in 1912 by Émile Oscar Guillaume on the centre of the roundabout near the beach of Calais, commemorating the accidental sinking of the submarine Pluviôse in May 1910, off the beach by the steamer Pas de Calais. Armand Fallières, president of the Republic, and his government came to Calais for a state funeral for its 27 victims. One of these victims, Delpierre Auguste, (1889–1910), drowned at age 21 before the beach at Calais; a dock in the city is named for him. The monument was dedicated on 22 June 1913.

Monument "Jacquard" was erected on the square in 1910, opposite the entrance to the Calais theatre. It commemorates Joseph Marie Jacquard, popular in Calais because of his contribution to the development of lace through his invention of the Jacquard loom. A tall column in the Courgain area of the city commemorates a visit by Louis XVIII.

Parc Richelieu, a garden behind the war memorial, was built in 1862 on the old city ramparts and redesigned in 1956. It contains a statue designed by Yves de Coëtlogon in 1962, remembering both world wars with an allegorical figure, representing Peace, which clutches an olive branch to her breast. Another monument in the Parc Richelieu, erected on 23 April 1994, marks the approximate site of Emma, Lady Hamilton's last resting place. She died in Calais on 15 January 1815.

=== Historic hotels ===
For many years the most famous hotel in Calais was the Hôtel d'Angleterre, often called Dessin's or Dessein's, after the family which owned it for almost a hundred years. Its popularity increased after Laurence Sterne set the early chapters of his 1768 novel A Sentimental Journey through France and Italy there. With the arrival of the railway fewer British visitors stopped in Calais and Dessin's closed in 1860.

Hôtel Meurice de Calais is a hotel, established in 1771 as Le Chariot Royal by the French postmaster, Charles-Augustin Meurice, who would later establish the five-star Hôtel Meurice, one of Paris's most famous luxury hotels. It was one of the earliest hotels on the continent of Europe to specifically cater for the British elite. The hotel was rebuilt in 1954–55. It has 41 en-suite rooms.

== Education ==
There are several schools in Calais. These include Groupe Scolaire Coubertin, Eglise Saint-Pierre, Universite du Littoral, Centre Universitaire, Lycée HQE Léonard de Vinci on Rue du Pasteur Martin Luther-King, École d'Art de Calais on Rue des Soupirants, and the Centre Scolaire Saint-Pierre on Rue du Four à Chaux which provides education in the primary grades, high school, and vocational school. There are at least seven colleges in the city, such as Collège Martin Luther King on Rue Martin Luther King, Collège Nationalisé Lucien Vadez on Avenue Yervant Toumaniantz, Collège Les Dentelliers on Rue Gaillard, College Jean Mace on Rue Maréchaux, Collège République on Place République, Collège Vauban on Rue Orléansville, and Collège Privé Mixte Jeanne d'Arc on Rue Champailler.

== Sport ==
Calais was represented in association football by the Calais RUFC, who competed in the Championnat National. The club was founded 1902 as Racing Club de Calais and in 1974 was renamed as Calais Racing Union Football Club. Calais RUFC had a good reputation in French cup competitions and went as far as the final in the 1999/2000 season, losing out finally to Nantes. From 2008 they played at the Stade de l'Épopée, a stadium which holds about 12,000 spectators. Calais Racing Union was liquidated in September 2017.

The rugby club in Calais is Amicale Rugby Calaisien. Basketball is popular in Calais with the teams Calais Basket (male) and COB Calais (female) as is volleyball with the Lis Calais (male) and Stella Calais (female) teams. There is also the SOC club which caters in a range of sports including athletics, handball and football and Yacht Club de Calais, a yachting club. Calais also has Les Seagulls, an American football team.

== Transport ==
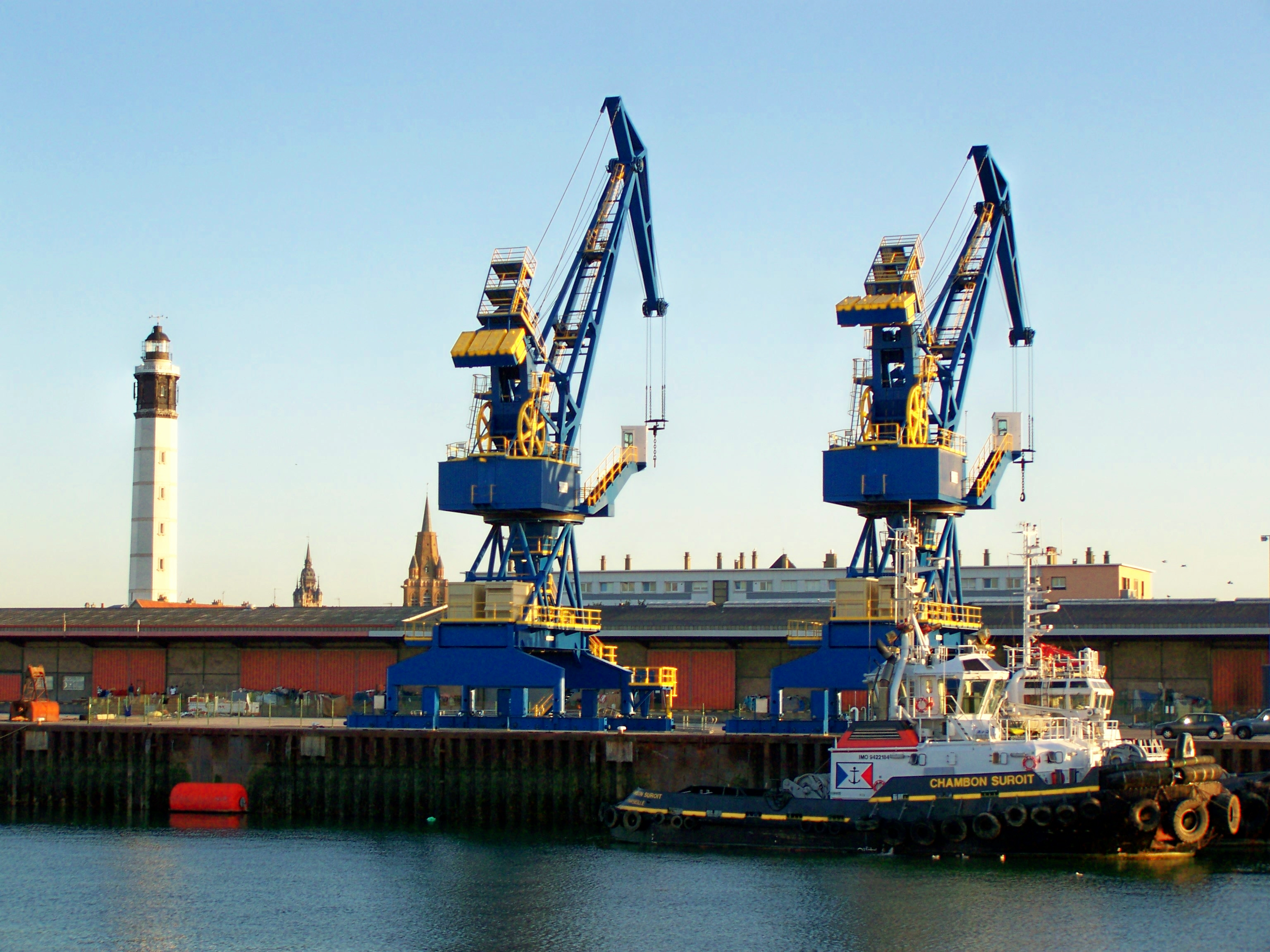
Cranes in the Ferry Terminal, Calais

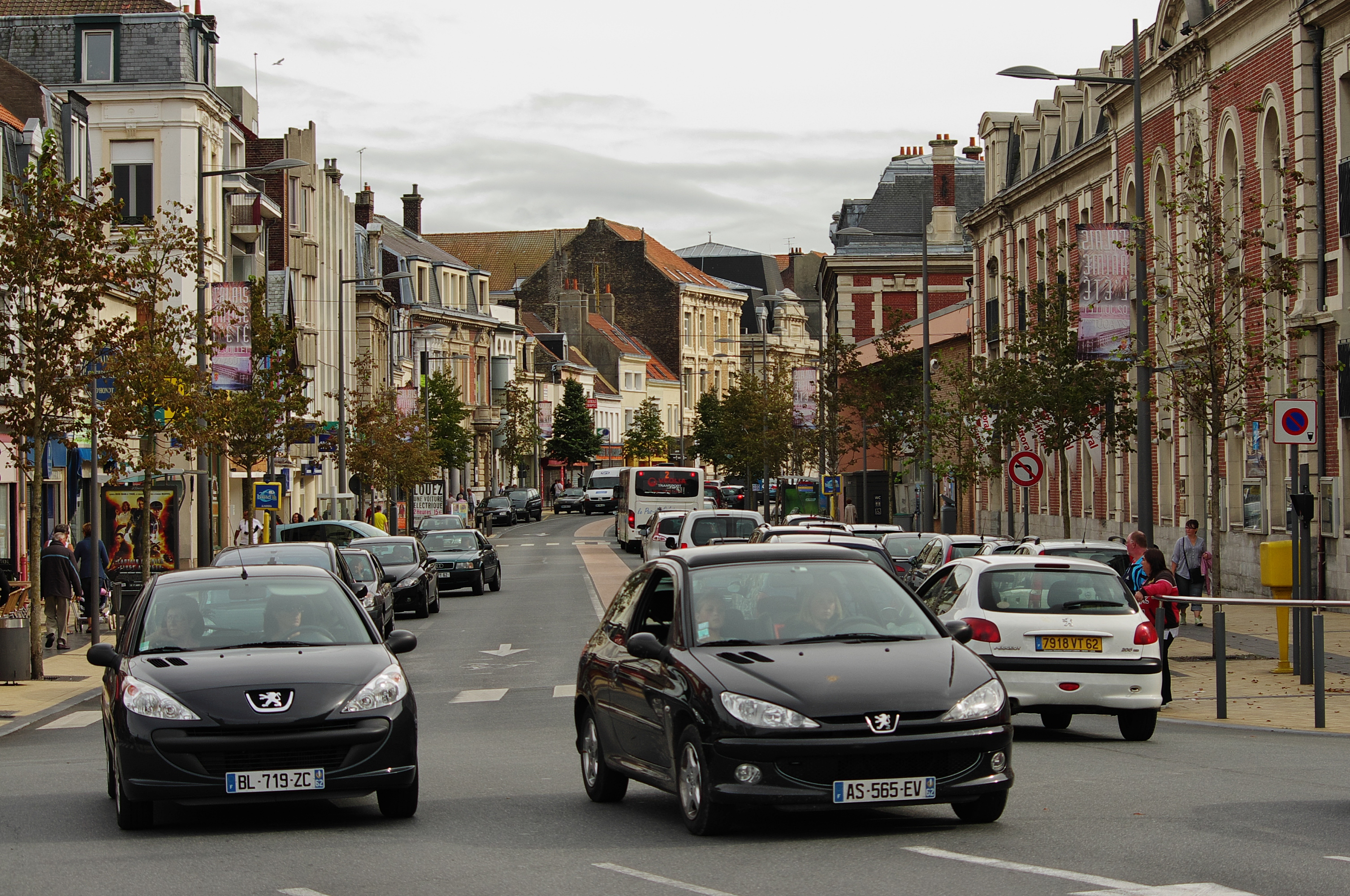
Boulevard Jacquard

=== Sea ===
The Port of Calais was the first cable ship port in Europe and is the fourth largest port in France and the largest for passenger traffic. The port accounts for more than a third of economic activity of the town of Calais. Cargo traffic has tripled over the past two decades. In 2007 more than 41.5 million tonnes of traffic passed through Calais with some 11.52 million passengers, 1.4 million trucks and trailers, 2.249 million cars and 4,700 crossings a year. Passenger numbers for the Dover to Calais route in 2018 were 9,168,000. On average, ships sail from the port every 30 minutes. A new 400 million euro project is underway at the port to create a breakwater protecting a pool of 700 meters long, thus allowing virtually all types of ships to stop at Calais.

=== Rail ===
As well as the large port, the town is served by three railway stations: Gare de Calais-Fréthun, Gare de Calais-Ville, and Gare des Fontinettes, the former being the first stop on mainland Europe of the Eurostar line. Gare de Calais-Ville is the nearest station to the port with trains to Gare de Boulogne-Ville and either Gare de Lille Flandres or Gare de Lille Europe.

Calais was also served by Saint-Pierre and Calais-Maritime. Both now closed.

Saint-Pierre was two separate stations. A temporary station was opened by the Chemins de fer du Nord in 1846, and closed in 1849 when Calais-Ville opened. It subsequently became the site of a marshalling yard. The second Saint-Pierre station was opened by the Chemin de fer d'Anvin à Calais (CF AC) on 1 October 1881. It closed in 1900 when the CF AC extended their line to Calais-Ville. The CF AC closed on 1 March 1955.

=== Road ===
Local bus services are provided by STCE. Free car parking facilities are available in front of the Calais ferry terminal and the maximum stay is three days.

=== Air ===
Calais is served by an airport and an airfield. Calais–Dunkerque Airport is located at Marck, 7 kilometres (4.3 mi) east north east of Calais. Saint-Inglevert Airfield is located at Saint-Inglevert, 13 kilometres (8.1 mi) south west of Calais.

== International relations ==
Calais is twinned with:

- Bardejov, Slovakia (since 6 September 2002)
- Brăila, Romania (since 8 May 2002)
- Duisburg, Germany (since 25 June 1964)
- Dover, United Kingdom (since June 1973)
- Wismar, Germany (since December 1971)
- Xiangtan, China

== See also ==
- Communes of the Pas-de-Calais department
- France–UK border
- List of mayors of Calais
