= Canton of Calais-3 =

Coordinates: 50.95°N 1.88°E

The canton of Calais-3 is an administrative division of the Pas-de-Calais department, in northern France. It was created at the French canton reorganisation which came into effect in March 2015. Its seat is in Calais.

It consists of the following communes:

1. Calais (partly)
