= Louis XVIII column =

Coordinates: 50°57′39″N 1°51′01″E

- Colonne Louis XVIII
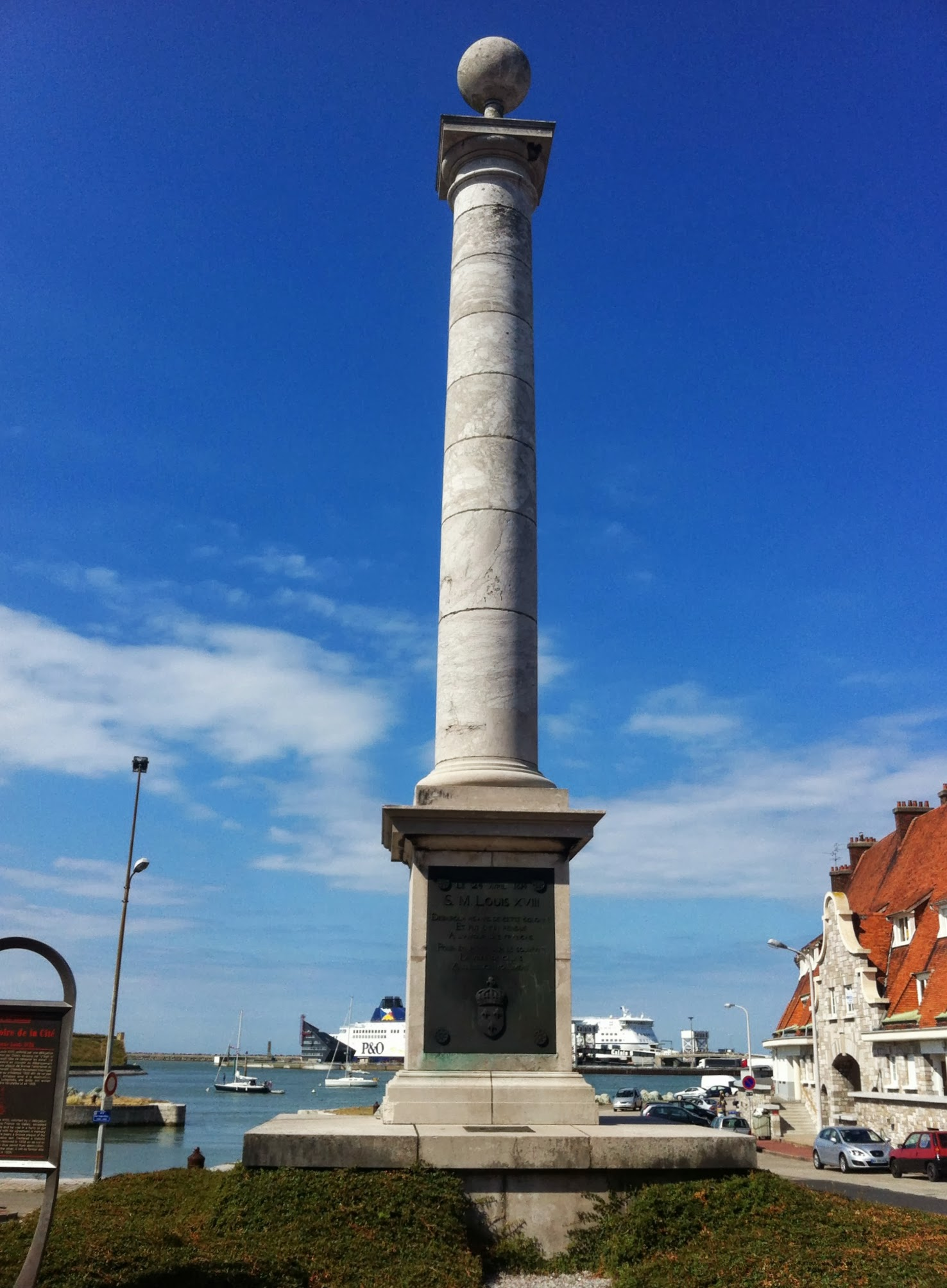
- Louis XVIII column in 2013
- Interactive map of Louis XVIII column
- Location: Calais, France
- Type: Victory column
- Dedicated to: Landing of Louis XVIII in Calais on April 24, 1814

The Louis XVIII column is a tall column in the Courgain area of Calais to commemorate the visit of King Louis XVIII to the city.

== History ==
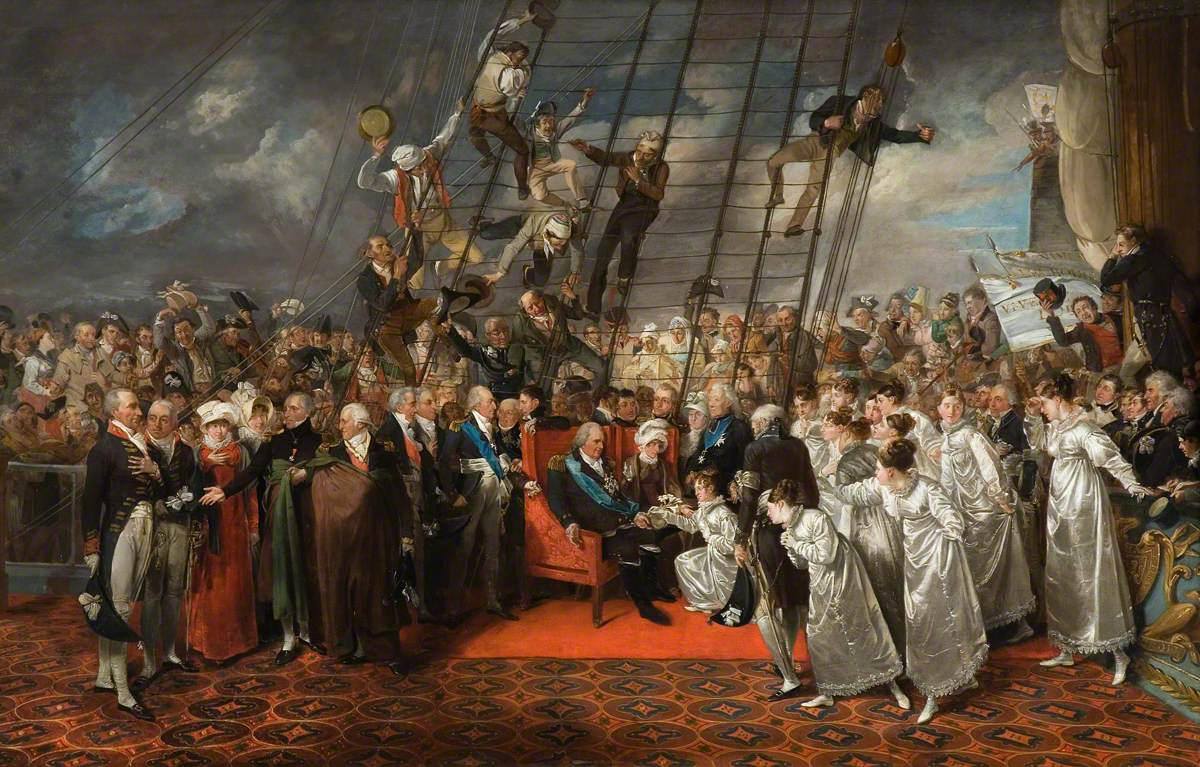
The Arrival of King Louis XVIII of France at Calais by Edward Bird, 1817

After the fall of the First French Empire, Louis XVIII, solicited by a delegation from the town council to return to France via Calais, accepted because "it was the shortest way and he was in a hurry to get back home". The monument set up with his agreement in memory of his landing of 24 April 1814 bears a bronze plaque of the royal foot print and a commemorative text. Declared a historic monument in 1933 the column was removed in 1939 so as not to impede work on the port and was thus saved from destruction. Formed as stone blocks one above the other, it left its former site on the quay to be erected in 1965 at its current spot in the Courgain area of the city.
