= Quartier Saint-Pierre (Calais) =

Coordinates: 50°56′40″N 1°51′33″E

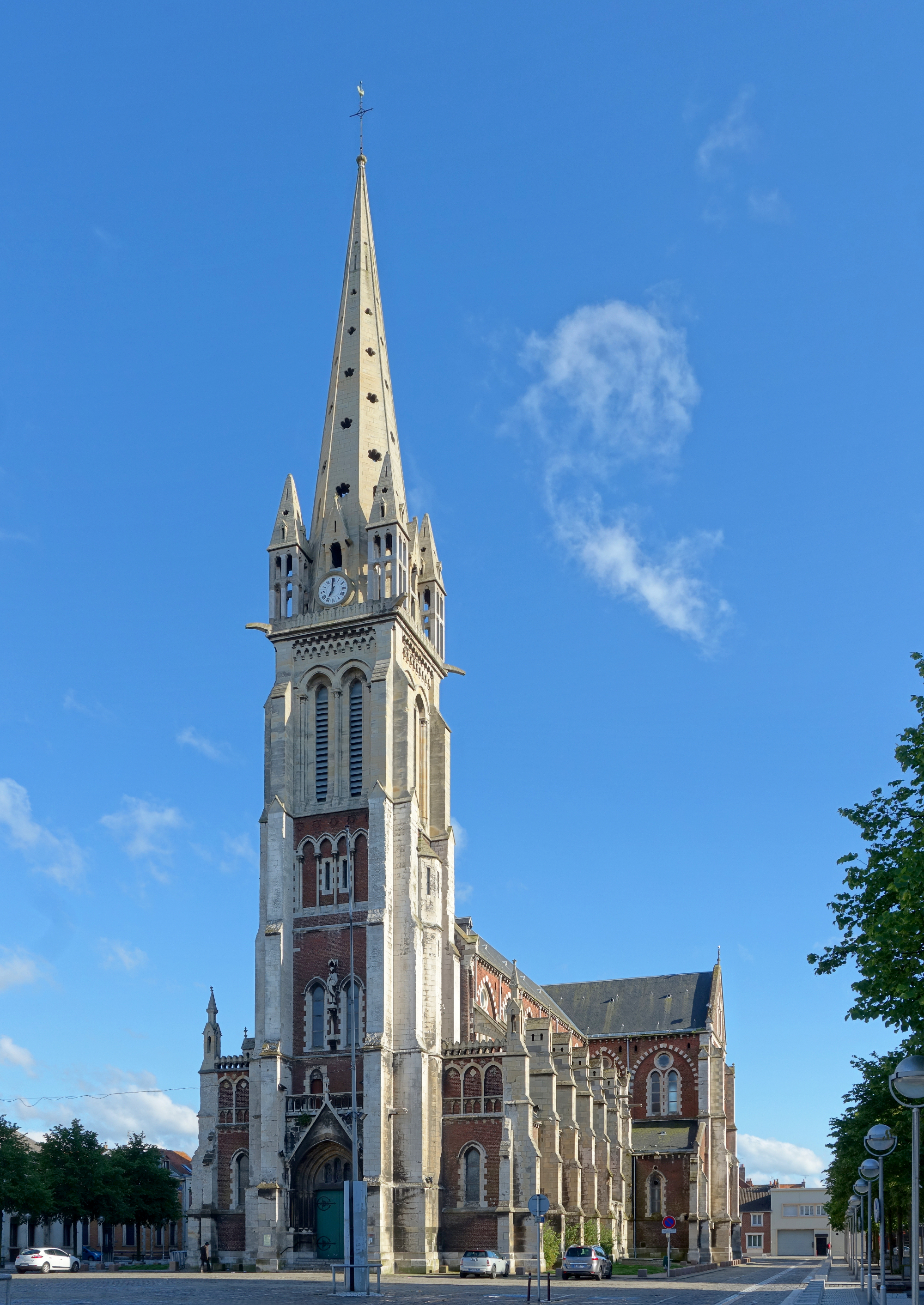
The church of Saint-Pierre de Calais, taken from the Place Crève-coeur.

The Quartier Saint-Pierre is the heart of the old town of Saint-Pierre-lès-Calais (West Flemish: Sint-Pieter), which was merged with the town of Calais in 1885.

It is centered on the church of St. Pierre, in front of which a market is held on Saturday mornings, and on the labor exchange.

The economy of the town of Saint-Pierre focused on the lace industry, that of Calais on its harbor and on fishing around Courghain.

The Gare de Calais-Ville was originally the station of Saint-Pierre-lès-Calais, opened in 1848 by the Chemin de Fer du Nord, 40 years before the union of Calais with Saint-Pierre. The bridge over the railway marks the boundary between the two ancient cities, and even today marks the boundary between the old industrial city and the port city.
