= Jean de Monchy =

French noble governor and commander (1500-1563)

- seigneur de Sénarpont
- Coat of arms
- Born: 1500
- Died: 1563 (aged 62–63)
- Noble family: Maison de Monchy
- Spouses: Marguerite d'Abbeville; Madeleine de Suze
- Issue: François de Monchy; Antoine de Monchy; Sidrach de Monchy; Gédeon de Monchy; Charlotte de Monchy; Françoise de Monchy

Jean de Monchy, seigneur de Sénarpont (1500–1563) was a French noble, governor and military commander during the Italian Wars and the early French Wars of Religion. Beginning his career under François I he served as the governor of Corbie from 1541 to 1550. At this time the kingdom regained control of Boulogne and the new king Henri II appointed him governor of the important port city. He was briefly the bailli (bailiff) of Amiens simultaneously. In 1557 the French were faced with disaster at the Saint-Quentin and in the aftermath Sénarpont enjoyed command as temporary lieutenant-general of maritime Picardie. Keen to avenge the defeat, Henri decided upon an attack against Calais, Sénarpont would be dispatched on several reconnaissance missions to assess the viability of this proposal, and it was determined to go ahead with the attack. Sénarpont participated in both the naval preparations and the land attack on Calais that saw it returned to France in January 1558.

In the aftermath of this victory he would be with the army of Marshal Thermes at the disastrous battle of Gravelines at which one of the French armies was destroyed. He was taken prisoner and would not be ransomed until after the Peace of Cateau-Cambrésis in 1559. After his release, he was established as the lieutenant-general of Picardie, replacing the sieur de Villebon. This made him the effective governor of the province for much of the time. He was charged in September 1560 with leading negotiations over the exact borders with Spanish Vlaanderen, however the commission ultimately wasn't able to conclude much before it was overtaken by various disorders. He was briefly removed as lieutenant-general at this time, though restored shortly thereafter. He was close with the new Protestant governor of Picardie the prince de Condé and with the outbreak of the first French War of Religion in April 1562, he joined Condé at Orléans for his rebellion. After a failed attempt on Calais he distanced himself from the war, returning to his estates after Condé entered alliance with the English. He died in 1563.

== Early life and family ==
Jean de Monchy was born in 1500.

=== Marriages ===
Sénarpont married first Marguerite d'Abbeville, the daughter of Louis d'Abbeville and Antoinette de Biencourt. She brought the lands of Biencourt with her to the marriage. He married again to Madeleine de Suze, dame de Belle in 1563. Madeleine de Suze was the daughter of Philippe de Suze, sieur de La Versine and Claude de Villiers.

He had issue:

- François de Monchy (–1552), murdered in Amiens, his killers were tortured and executed by the governor of Picardie;
- Antoine de Monchy, baron of Vimeu;
- Jean de Monchy, sieur de Hercourt;
- Sidrach de Monchy, sieur de Moimont;
- Gédeon de Monchy, sieur de Mons;
- Charlotte de Monchy, married the seigneur de Nesle;
- Françoise de Monchy, married the sieur de Sainte-Marie-du-Mont

== Reign of François I ==
Around 1522 Sénarpont was in theory in receipt of a royal pension of around 300 livres, though he did not actually receive it.

In 1531 he inherited the seigneurie of Sénarpont from Edmund de Monchy.

From 1541 to 1550 Sénarpont served as the governor of Corbie.

== Reign of Henri II ==
=== Boulogne ===
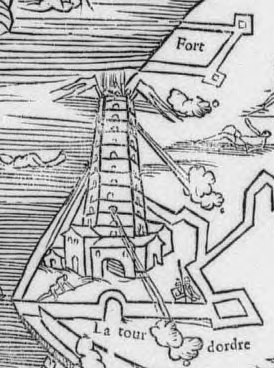
English fortifications around Boulogne at the time of the 1550 siege

Boulogne in Picardie had fallen into the hands of the English during the reign of François I. A campaign was conducted for its reconquest during 1549. The English surrendered the city to the French in April 1550 in exchange for a sum of 400,000 livres. That year Sénarpont was established as the governor of Boulogne at the king's request. He would hold this charge for the next nine years.

From 1550 until the following year, alongside his responsibilities in Boulogne, Sénarpont served as the bailli (bailiff) of Amiens.

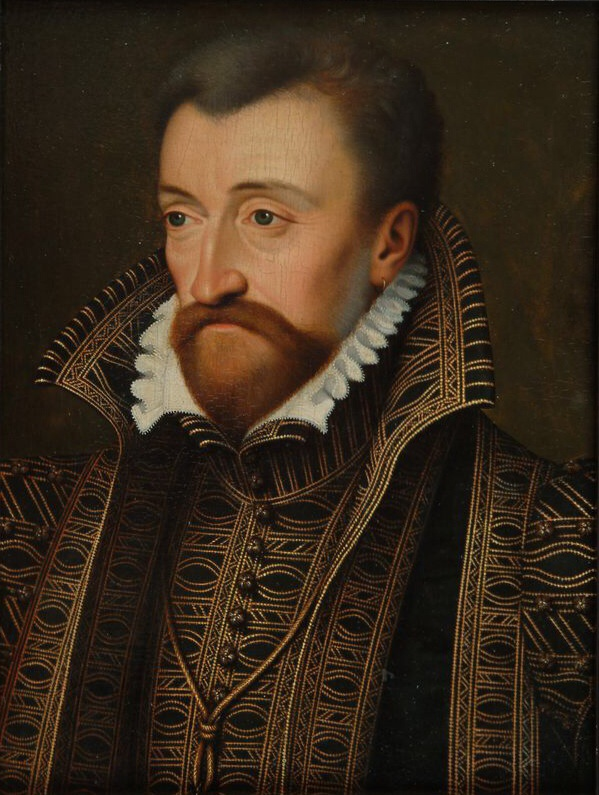
Antoine de Bourbon, duc de Vendôme the governor of Picardie

1552 was a time of military crisis in Picardie, an invasion of the kingdom having been undertaken to take the drive out of the royal campaign into the Three Bishoprics, the Holy Roman Emperor marching to seize La Fère in Picardie from the French in October. Therefore, Henri instructed the governor the duc de Vendôme to look to Sénarpont and Villebon for advice on how to navigate through the situation.

In March 1553, Henri granted Sénarpont a mill (near the fortress of Blaquenaye) that had been built by the English.

Sénarpont became captain of a company of 50 gendarmes in 1554.

=== Saint-Quentin ===
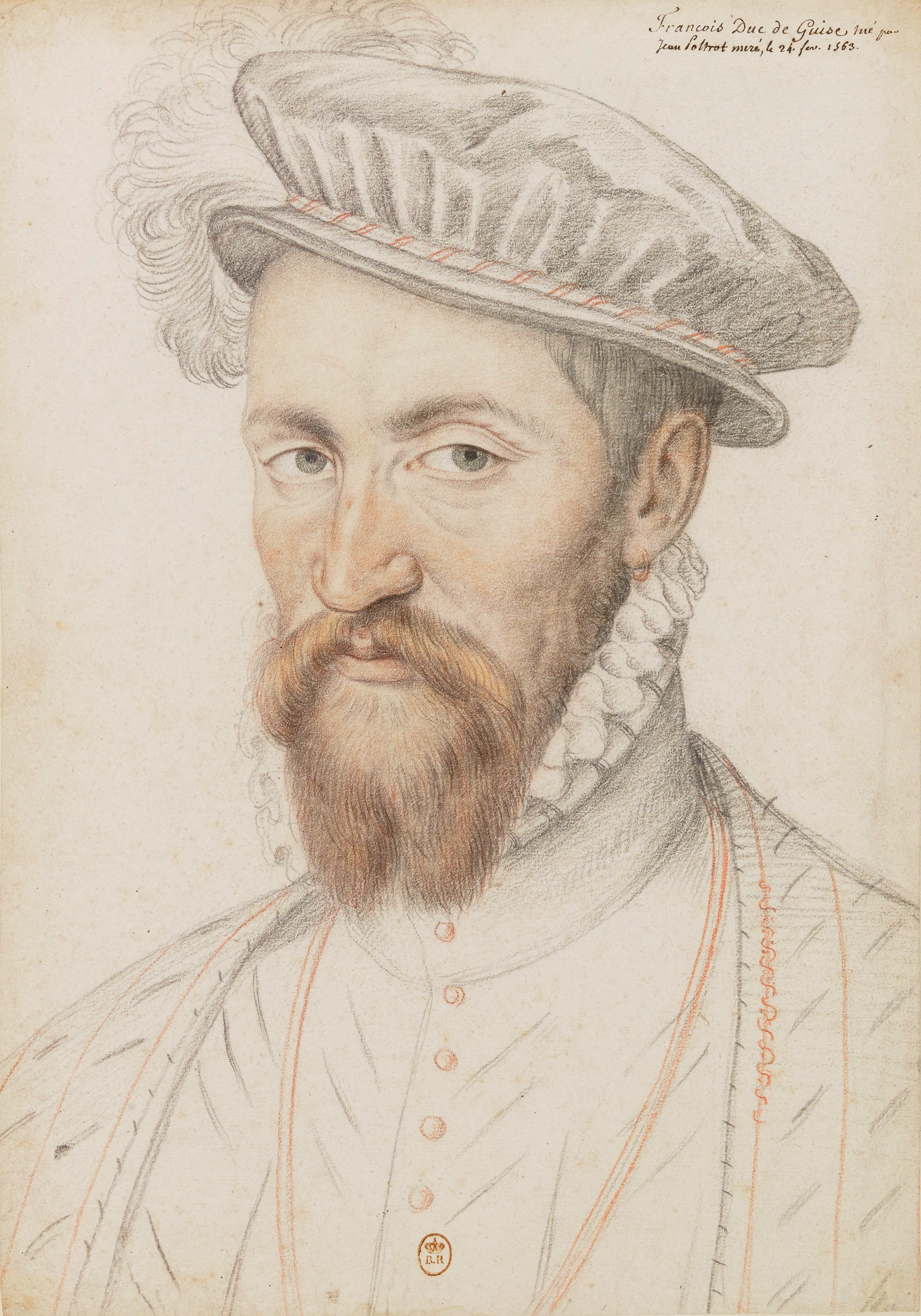
François de Lorraine, duc de Guise, who would be recalled to the kingdom in the wake of the disaster at Saint-Quentin and lead the capture of Calais

With the disastrous defeat of the royal army under Anne de Montmorency at the battle of Saint-Quentin, the northern frontier of France was left without military leadership and a weakened army. In the absence of other commanders, Henri took personal responsibility for some military arrangements, coordinating with the governor of Péronne Humières for the provision of pioneers to work on the walls of the city. In terms of local command, the sieur de Villebon, lieutenant-general of Picardie was commanded by the king to hurry to Corbie by Henri, on the assumption the Spanish would strike there next. Meanwhile, Sénarpont was entrusted to command the maritime parts of Picardie that Villebon could not devote attentions to during the crisis. During September, Marshal Thermes arrived back from Italia to take command of the army temporarily, in the time before the duc de Guise could return from Italia. On 9 October Guise arrived back at the French court and was received adoringly by the king. Sénarpont wrote to the recently returned Guise on 12 October from his governate, expressing his desire to devote his property and life in the grandee's service.

=== Calais ===
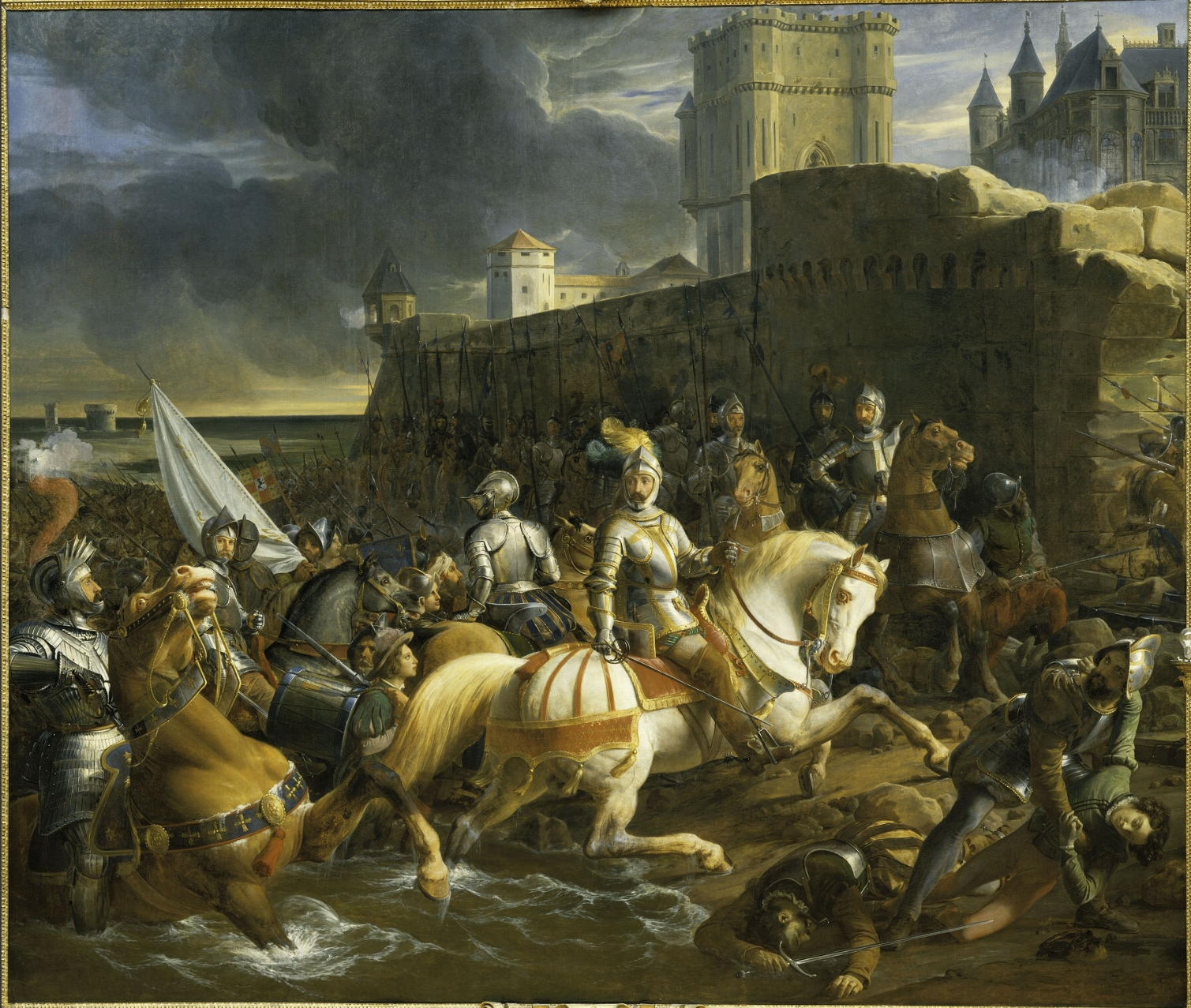
The Siege of Calais by François-Édouard Picot, 1838

The decision was made between Henri and Guise to undertake an attempt to recapture Calais, which was in English hands. By this means it was hoped to overcome the humiliation of Saint-Quentin. Calais had been in English hands for over 200 years. Sénarpont was reached out to by the king and he gave a favourable assessment of the project. He was instructed to conduct reconnaissance of the Pale in October. He reported to the conseil privé (privy council) which was residing in Compiègne on 21 November that the defences of the city were weak. This confirmed the suspicions Henri had already held. Henri proposed a winter attack of Calais, both for the surprise factor but also because the French mercenary forces could be used before their contract expired. Guise did not like the idea of attacking during the winter.

Due to this scepticism, Sénarpont was again dispatched to conduct reconnaissance, this time with the respected engineer Piero Strozzi, they arrived in mid-November, inspecting the area while disguised as poor people. They examined the ramparts of Calais, and the outskirts of the city. They confirmed the weakness of the defences, however they added to the scepticism of a winter assault. Sénarpont wrote to Guise that to ensure the English did not suspect that anything was being planned he was going to return to his seigneurie and let the rumour spread that he intended to winter there.

Henri was pleased by the assessment of Strozzi/Sénarpont and responded to the criticism of the winter conditions that the freezing weather of January was necessary to combat the marshes that surround the city.

Henri's plans were adopted, and Guise was designated to lead the siege of Calais. Several warships were gathered in Sénarpont's city of Boulogne, to unite with forty transports that were held in the Somme, these were to blockade Calais so that no reinforcements might arrive (this was accomplished without suspicions from the English). On 30 December the ships departed and deployed off the coast of Calais. Meanwhile, Sénarpont oversaw the receipt of supplies in Boulogne for the coming siege. The ground assault began on 1 January.

The English were caught by complete surprise by the arrival of the French Army in front of Calais. On 2 January after having led an attack against the fortress of Nieulay which commanded the causeway to Calais, Guise inspected the dunes that led to Risbank (a fortress that guarded the port). He conducted his inspection alongside his various lieutenants: his brother the duc d'Aumale, Marshal Thermes, Strozzi, the grand maître de l'artillerie (grandmaster of the artillery) D'Andelot and Sénarpont. A ford that was passable at low tied was identified as a result of this examination. The next day Guise's heavy artillery bombarded Risbank, causing the garrison to flee. Wentworth (the English governor of Calais) asked for terms on 8 January. The final part of the Calais fortifications would be taken by Guise's forces between 20 and 24 January.

In April Villebon departed for court, keen to secure permission from the king to take leave of his responsibilities and return to his estates. This request was refused, but during the period of his absence, Sénarpont again assumed responsibilities as lieutenant-general over maritime Picardie.

=== Gravelines ===
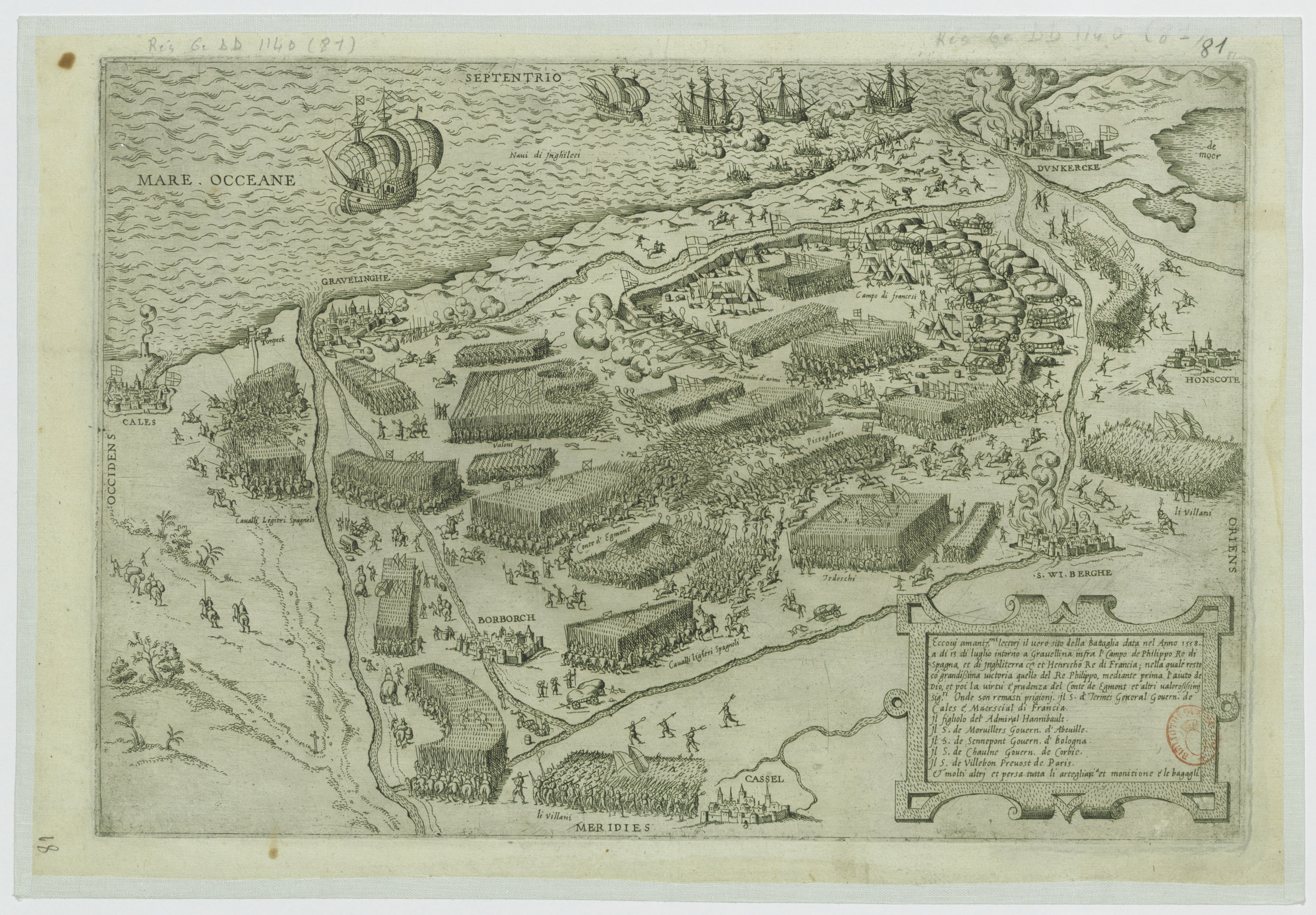
Destruction of the French army at Gravelines

In June, Guise had proceeded to conduct a siege of Thionville which he brought to a successful conclusion on 22 June (though not without considerable French losses, among them Strozzi). With this accomplished he pushed forward towards Luxembourg. De Thermes took a force out of French Calais into Vlaanderen to divert Spanish attention from the Luxembourg attack. De Thermes had a force of around 9000 foot and 1500 horse, which bypassed the fortress of Gravelines and moved on towards Dunkerque. As a depot town there was much plunder, and De Thermes' army gorged itself on the town and those in the surrounding area before deciding to retreat back to Calais. Unknown to De Thermes, a Spanish army had rapidly assembled under the graaf van Egmont (count of Egmont) with the intention of cutting the armies line of retreat. This army, larger than the French, was able to bring them to battle. An English fleet joined the fray savaging one of De Thermes' wings and the army was annihilated, only a small force making it back to the safety of Calais. Among the captives were De Thermes, and Sénarpont who had been with the army. Calais was left largely undefended but Egmont decided not to risk his force.

=== Peace ===
Though the Peace of Cateau-Cambrésis had ended the Italian Wars, it did not bring about the immediate release of all the prisoners in French and Spanish captivity. As a result, a separate convention was signed between Constable Montmorency and the Spanish general the duque de Alba (duke of Alba) established the fate of those still imprisoned. Henri travels to Spanish Nederland in May to oversee the releases, common prisoners having their liberty restored without ransom, while the great lords in captivity have ransoms established by their captors. Sénarpont's ransom was viewed as excessive for his value as a prisoner.

=== Lieutenant-general ===
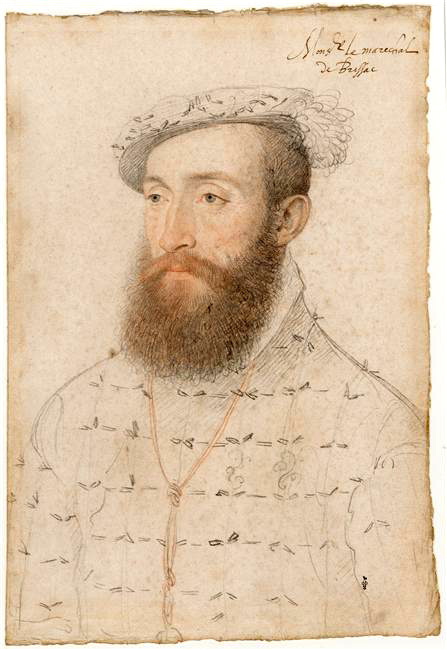
Comte de Brissac who succeeded Admiral Coligny as governor of Picardie

Upon his release he was established in May as lieutenant-general of the province of Picardie, making him acting governor in the absence of his superior. By this promotion the governorship of Boulogne which he had held was declared to be vacant. He replaced Villebon in this role, who was granted permission by the king to return to his home province of Normandie. Coligny was, due to his eclectic responsibilities unable to be an active and present governor, and therefore Sénarpont did the majority of the work of governing the province. In the provisions that established him as lieutenant-general, he was given great specificity as to his responsibilities. He was charged to ensure the judicial officers of Picardie did their duty, ensure the province remained at peace, suppress all brigandage, keep garrisons orderly and punish those that violate this, alter garrisons as he believed appropriate, handle musters, act as the king would if he were present. In late 1559 the prince de Condé was to be made the governor of Picardie, however he did not assume the charge at this time. It would in fact by the more reliably Catholic comte de Brissac who assumed the governorship upon Coligny's resignation in January 1560.

== Reign of François II ==
In September a conference was undertaken at Cambrai. The aim was to address the specifics of the border between French Picardie and Spanish Vlaanderen, which had been left somewhat vague at the larger peace conference. This had resulted in violence continuing over the control of the various villages of the frontier. Therefore, Sénarpont was tasked with leading the French negotiations, while the Spanish deputised Molembaix. The actual specifics of the talks would be conducted by subordinates, for Sénarpont Jacques de Mesmes, the sieur de Roissy. The two sides agreed to begin an investigation of the land on 20 September. The actual walking of the frontier began the following March, the French strategy was to focus on seigneurial claims as opposed to trying to claim blocks of land. After months of disputes on the road by early May the French declared they had sufficient evidence gathered. It was agreed to meet in Péronne on 25 June to pass over the various title deeds. Ultimately the discussion was left unresolved, and the 1559 status quo was left frozen, as strife consumed the following decades.

The comte de Brissac was faced with a difficult circumstance in his new governate. Both Sénarpont and Bouchavannes (who commanded the two gendarmerie companies of the province) were loyal to Condé. Sénarpont maintained the main authority for administering the province.

=== Condé ===
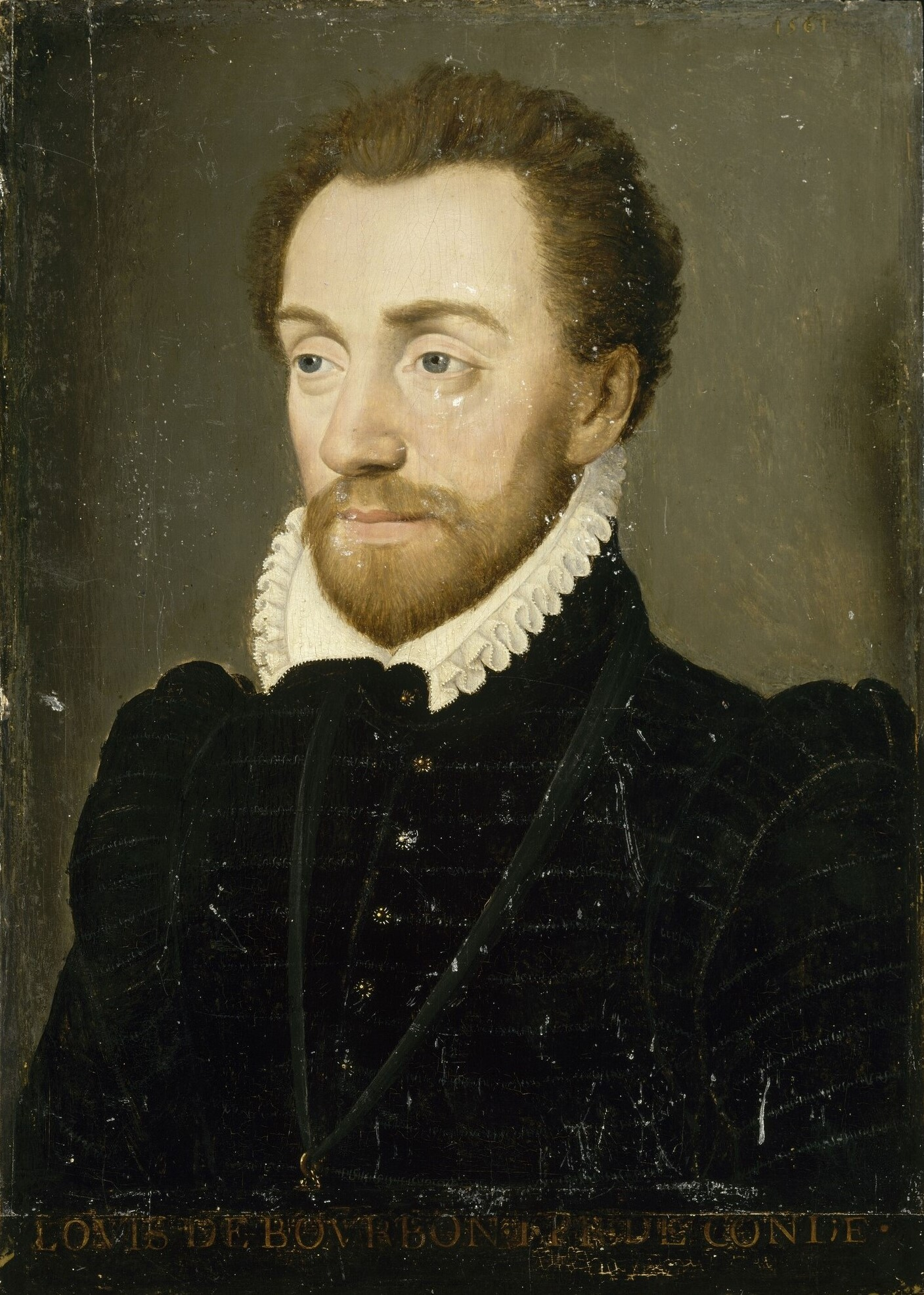
Prince de Condé who would convert to Protestantism, serve as governor of Picardie after Brissac and enter rebellion in 1562 starting the first French War of Religion

In September 1560, rumours swirled that a coalition of aristocratic opponents against the house of Lorraine's control of the kingdom had formed. According to La Place, under this plan the prince de Condé and king of Navarre would march up from Guyenne under the pretext of visiting the king. They would be met by the baron de Damville, second son of Constable Montmorency at Poitiers with 5-600 soldiers. The Constable Montmorency would secure Paris, the duc d'Étampes would ensure Bretagne followed, the comte de Tende would secure Provence and Sénarpont and Bouchavannes would take responsibility for bringing over Picardie to the plot. With the kingdom secured, Guise would then be put on trial.

Sometime in September, Sénarpont was briefly replaced as lieutenant-general by the sieur de Chalnes before he was called to court, and authority returned to being split by Sénarpont and Humières in Picardie who administered the province from Abbeville and Péronne respectively. At this time Condé's involvement in the Conspiracy of Amboise led to him being detained by the Lorraine government, he would be released with the death of François II.

== Reign of Charles IX ==
Sénarpont was a Protestant client of the house of Bourbon, and therefore rallied to the prince de Condé upon his elevation to governor of Picardie on 3 October 1561 (justified on the basis of the Bourbon hereditary right to the governate). Condé had converted to Protestantism in August 1558 and was followed in his conversion by many of the grandees of Picardie: the sieur de Genlis and the sieur d'Ivoy, alongside the governor of Boulogne the seigneur de Morvilliers. Sénarpont for his part was suspected of at least being sympathetic to Protestantism after the preaching tour of John Knox in Dieppe in 1559 if not a Protestant himself. This network of Picard Protestant nobility affiliated itself with Condé and the provincial lieutenant-general Sénarpont.

=== First French War of Religion ===
In April 1562, Condé declared himself to be in rebellion from Orléans. Among the nobles with him in Orléans for this moment were Sénarpont who was a signatory to his declaration of association. Several of Sénarpont's sons were also signatories of the rebellious association. In May, Sénarpont made an attempt to capture Calais, however this was a failure and he was stopped from his purposes by a governor under the authority of Cardinal de Bourbon. Though he had strong links with many other Protestants fighting the crown, he withdrew from participation in the civil war prior to its conclusion, likely at the time at which the English were brought into the war as allies of the rebels. At this time he returned to his estates

He died the following year in 1563.

== Sources ==
- Baumgartner, Frederic (1988). Henry II: King of France 1547–1559. Duke University Press.
- Belleval, René de (2022). Les Fiefs et les Seigneuries du Ponthieu & du Vimeu. Outlook Verlag.
- Benedict, Philip (2020). Season of Conspiracy: Calvin, the French Reformed Churches, and Protestant Plotting in the Reign of Francis II (1559-1560). American Philosophical Society Press.
- Carroll, Stuart (2011). Martyrs and Murderers: The Guise Family and the Making of Europe. Oxford University Press.
- Cloulas, Ivan (1985). Henri II. Fayard.
- Durot, Éric (2012). François de Lorraine, duc de Guise entre Dieu et le Roi. Classiques Garnier. ISBN 9782812406102.
- La Gorgue-Rosny, Louis Eugène de (1874). Recherches généalogiques sur les comtés de Ponthieu, de Boulogne, de Guines et pays circonvoisins, Volume 1. Imprimerie Camille Le Roy.
- Harding, Robert (1978). Anatomy of a Power Elite: the Provincial Governors in Early Modern France. Yale University Press.
- Potter, David (1993). War and Government in the French Provinces: Picardy 1470-1560. Cambridge University Press.
- Potter, David (2001). "The French Protestant Nobility in 1562: The 'Associacion de Monseigneur le Prince de Condé'". French History. 15 3.
- Le Roux, Nicolas (2022). 1559-1629 Les Guerres de Religion. Gallimard.
- Sutherland, Nicola (1962). The French Secretaries of State in the Age of Catherine de Medici. The Athlone Press.
