= France in the early modern period =

During the early modern period, from the Renaissance (c. 1500–1550) to the Revolution (1789–1804), the Kingdom of France was a monarchy ruled by the House of Bourbon (a Capetian cadet branch). This corresponds to the so-called Ancien Régime ("old rule"). The territory of France during this period increased until it included essentially the extent of the modern country, and it also included the territories of the first French colonial empire overseas.

The period is dominated by the figure of the "Sun King", Louis XIV (his reign of 1643–1715 being one of the longest in history), who managed to eliminate the remnants of medieval feudalism and established a centralized state under an absolute monarch, a system that would endure until the French Revolution and beyond.

== Geography ==
France on the eve of the modern era (1477). The red line denotes the boundary of the French kingdom, while the light blue the royal domain.

In the mid 15th century, France was significantly smaller than it is today, (Note: In 1492, roughly 450,000 km^{2} (173,746 sq mi) versus 550,000 km^{2} (212,356 sq mi) in the 1990s.) and numerous border provinces (such as Roussillon, Cerdagne, Calais, Béarn, Navarre, County of Foix, Flanders, Artois, Lorraine, Alsace, Trois-Évêchés, Franche-Comté, Savoy, Bresse, Bugey, Gex, Nice, Provence, Corsica and Brittany) were autonomous or foreign-held (as by the Kingdom of England); there were also foreign enclaves, like the Comtat Venaissin. In addition, certain provinces within France were ostensibly personal fiefdoms of noble families (like the Bourbonnais, Marche, Forez and Auvergne provinces held by the House of Bourbon until the provinces were forcibly integrated into the royal domaine in 1527 after the fall of Charles III, Duke of Bourbon).

The late 15th, 16th and 17th centuries would see France undergo a massive territorial expansion and an attempt to better integrate its provinces into an administrative whole. During this period, France expanded to nearly its modern territorial extent through the acquisition of Picardy, Burgundy, Anjou, Maine, Provence, Brittany, Franche-Comté, French Flanders, Navarre, Roussillon, the Duchy of Lorraine, Alsace and Corsica.

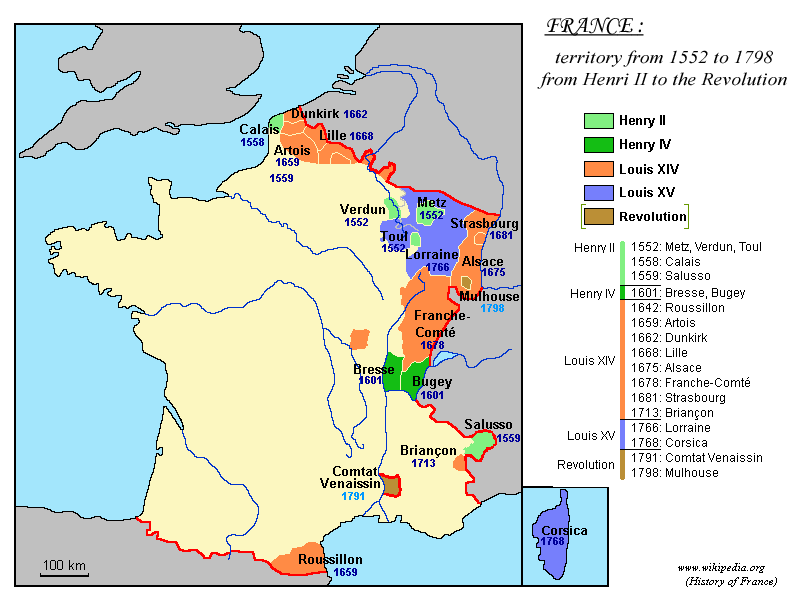
French territorial expansion, 1552–1798

French acquisitions from 1461 to 1789:

- Under Louis XI – Provence (1482), Dauphiné (1461, under French control since 1349)
- Under Henry II – Calais, Trois-Évêchés (1552)
- Under Henry IV – County of Foix (1607)
- Under Louis XIII – Béarn and Navarre (1620, under French control since 1589 as part of Henry IV's possessions)
- Under Louis XIV
  - Treaty of Westphalia (1648) – Alsace
  - Treaty of the Pyrenees (1659) – Artois, Northern Catalonia (Roussillon, Cerdagne)
  - Treaty of Nijmegen (1678–79) – Franche-Comté, Flanders
- Under Louis XV – Lorraine (1766), Corsica (1768)

Only the Duchy of Savoy, the city of Nice and some other small papal (e.g., Avignon) and foreign possessions would be acquired later. (For a map of historic French provinces, see Provinces of France). France also embarked on exploration, colonisation, and mercantile exchanges with the Americas (New France, Louisiana, Martinique, Guadeloupe, Haiti, French Guiana), India (Pondicherry), the Indian Ocean (Réunion), the Far East, and a few African trading posts.

Although Paris was the capital of France, the later Valois kings largely abandoned the city as their primary residence, preferring instead various châteaux of the Loire Valley and Parisian countryside. Henry IV made Paris his primary residence (promoting a major building boom in private mansions), but Louis XIV once again withdrew from the city in the last decades of his reign and Versailles became the primary seat of the French monarchy for much of the following century.

The administrative and legal system in France in this period is generally called the Ancien Régime.

== Demography ==
The Black Death had killed an estimated one-third of the population of France from its appearance in 1348. The concurrent Hundred Years' War slowed recovery. It would be the early 16th century before the population recovered to mid-14th-century levels.

With an estimated population of 11 million in 1400, 20 million in the 17th century, and 28 million in 1789, until 1795 France was the most populated country in Europe (even twice the size of Britain or the Dutch Republic) and the third most populous country in the world, behind only China and India.

These demographic changes also led to a massive increase in urban populations, although on the whole France remained a profoundly rural country. Paris was one of the most populated cities in Europe (estimated at 400,000 inhabitants in 1550; 650,000 at the end of the 18th century). Other major French cities include Lyon, Rouen, Bordeaux, Toulouse, and Marseille.

These centuries saw several periods of epidemics and crop failures due to wars and climatic change. (Historians speak of the period 1550–1850 as the "Little Ice Age".) Between 1693 and 1694, France lost 6% of its population. In the extremely harsh winter of 1709, France lost 3.5% of its population. In the past 300 years, no period has been so proportionally deadly for the French, both World Wars included.

== Language ==
Linguistically, the differences in France were extreme. Before the Renaissance, the language spoken in the north of France was a collection of different dialects called Oïl languages whereas the written and administrative language remained Latin. By the 16th century, there had developed a standardised form of French (called Middle French) which would be the basis of the standardised "modern" French of the 17th and 18th century which in turn became the lingua franca of the European continent. (In 1539, with the Ordinance of Villers-Cotterêts, Francis I of France made French alone the language for legal and juridical acts.) Nevertheless, in 1790, only half of the population spoke or understood standard French.

The southern half of the country continued to speak Occitan languages (such as Provençal), and other inhabitants spoke Breton, Catalan, Basque, Dutch (West Flemish), and Franco-Provençal. In the north of France, regional dialects of the various langues d'oïl continued to be spoken in rural communities. During the French revolution, the teaching of French was promoted in all the schools. The French used would be that of the legal system, which differed from the French spoken in the courts of France before the revolution. Like the orators during the French revolution, the pronunciation of every syllable would become the new language.

France would not become a linguistically unified country until the end of the 19th century.

== Administrative structures ==
The Ancien Régime, the French term rendered in English as "Old Rule", "Old Kingdom", or simply "Old Regime", refers primarily to the aristocratic, social and political system established in France from (roughly) the 15th century to the 18th century under the late Valois and Bourbon dynasties. The administrative and social structures of the Ancien Régime were the result of years of state-building, legislative acts (like the Ordinance of Villers-Cotterêts), internal conflicts and civil wars, but they remained a confusing patchwork of local privilege and historic differences until the French Revolution took place in a radical time suppression of administrative incoherence.

== Political history ==
=== Background ===
The Peace of Etaples (1492) marks, for some, the beginning of the early modern period in France.

After the Hundred Years' War (1337–1453), France supported the Lancastrian side in The Wars of the Roses. France and England signed the Treaty of Picquigny in 1475 — the official end date of the Hundred Years' War. In 1492 and 1493, after supporting the victorious House of Tudor in the Battle of Bosworth Field, Charles VIII of France signed three additional treaties with Henry VII of England, Maximilian I of Habsburg, and Ferdinand II of Aragon respectively at Étaples (1492), Senlis (1493) and in Barcelona (1493). As the 15th century drew to a close, French kings could take confidence in the fact that England had been mostly driven from their territory and so they could now embark on an expansionist foreign policy. The invasion of Italy by Charles VIII in 1494 began 62 years of war with the Habsburgs (the Italian Wars).

=== Wars ===
Despite the beginnings of rapid demographic and economic recovery after the Black Death of the 14th century, the gains of the previous half-century were to be jeopardised by a further protracted series of conflicts, the Italian Wars (1494–1559), where French efforts to gain dominance ended in the increased power of the Habsburg Holy Roman Emperors of Germany.

In 1445, the first steps were made towards fashioning a regular army out of the poorly disciplined mercenary bands that French kings traditionally relied on. The medieval division of society into "those who fought (nobility), those who prayed (clergy), and those who worked (everyone else)" still held strong and warfare was considered a domain of the nobles. Charles VIII marched into Italy with a core force consisting of noble horsemen and non-noble foot soldiers, but in time the role of the latter grew stronger so that by the middle of the 16th century, France had a standing army of 5000 cavalry and 30,000 infantry. The military was reorganized from a system of legions recruited by province (Norman legion, Gascon legion, etc.) to regiments, an arrangement which persisted into the next century. However, the nobility and troops were often disloyal to the king, if not outright rebellious, and it took another army reform by Louis XIV to finally transform the French army into an obedient force.

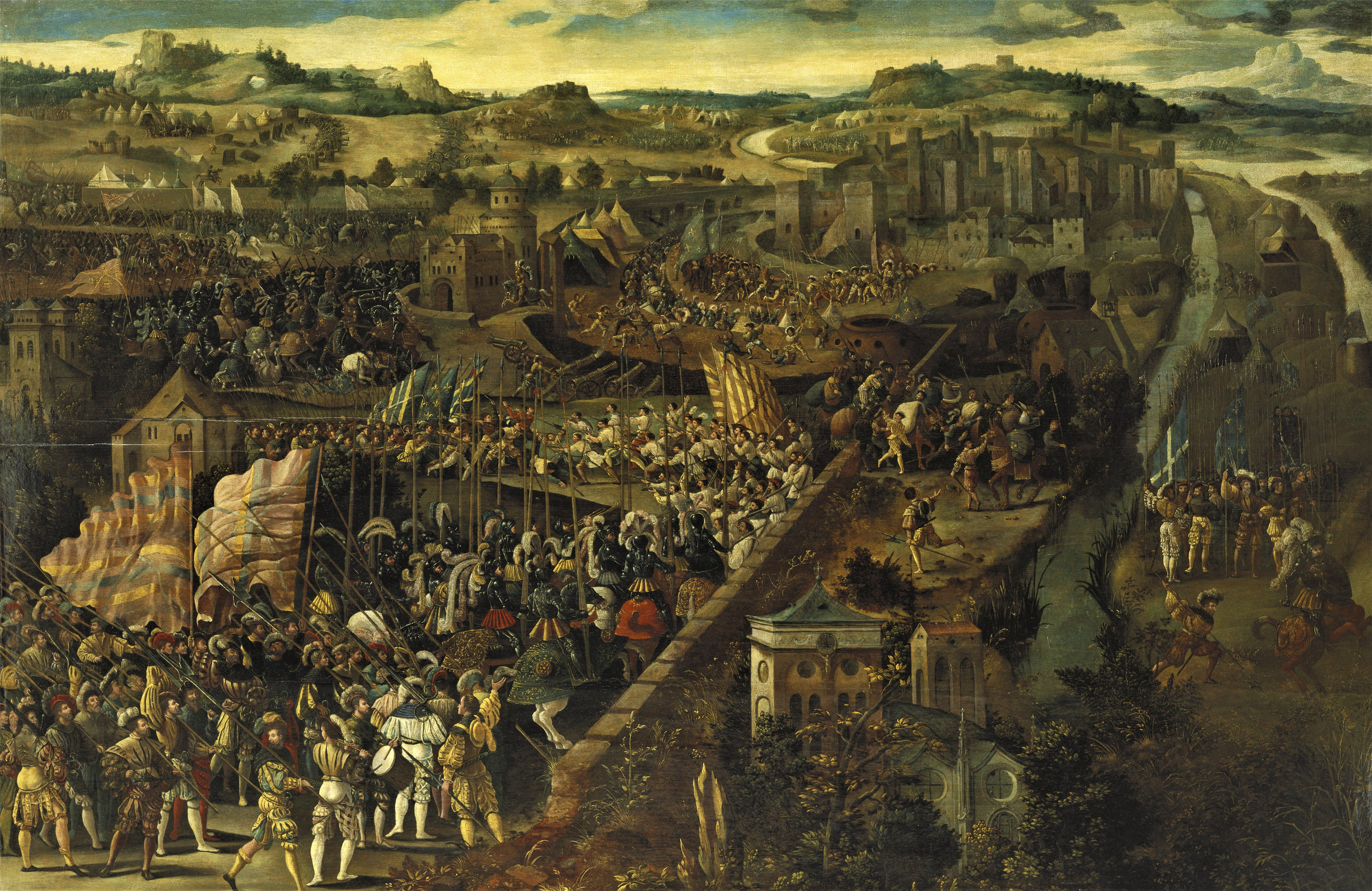
The Battle of Pavia in 1525

Ludovico Sforza, the Duke of Milan, seeking an ally against the Republic of Venice, encouraged Charles VIII of France to invade Italy, using the Angevin claim to the throne of Naples, then under Aragonese control, as a pretext. When Ferdinand I of Naples died in 1494, Charles invaded the peninsula. For several months, French forces moved through Italy virtually unopposed, since the condottieri armies of the Italian city-states were unable to resist them. Their sack of Naples finally provoked a reaction, however, and the League of Venice was formed against them. Italian troops defeated the French at the Battle of Fornovo, forcing Charles to withdraw to France. Ludovico, having betrayed the French at Fornovo, retained his throne until 1499, when Charles's successor, Louis XII, invaded Lombardy and seized Milan.

In 1500, Louis XII, having reached an agreement with Ferdinand II of Aragon to divide Naples, marched south from Milan. By 1502, combined French and Aragonese forces had seized control of the Kingdom; disagreements about the terms of the partition led to a war between Louis and Ferdinand. By 1503, Louis, having been defeated at the Battle of Cerignola and Battle of Garigliano, was forced to withdraw from Naples, which was left under the control of the Spanish viceroy, Ramón de Cardona. French forces under Gaston de Foix inflicted an overwhelming defeat on a Spanish army at the Battle of Ravenna in 1512, but Foix was killed during the battle, and the French were forced to withdraw from Italy by an invasion of Milan by the Swiss, who reinstated Maximilian Sforza to the ducal throne. The Holy League, left victorious, fell apart over the subject of dividing the spoils, and in 1513 Venice allied with France, agreeing to partition Lombardy between them.

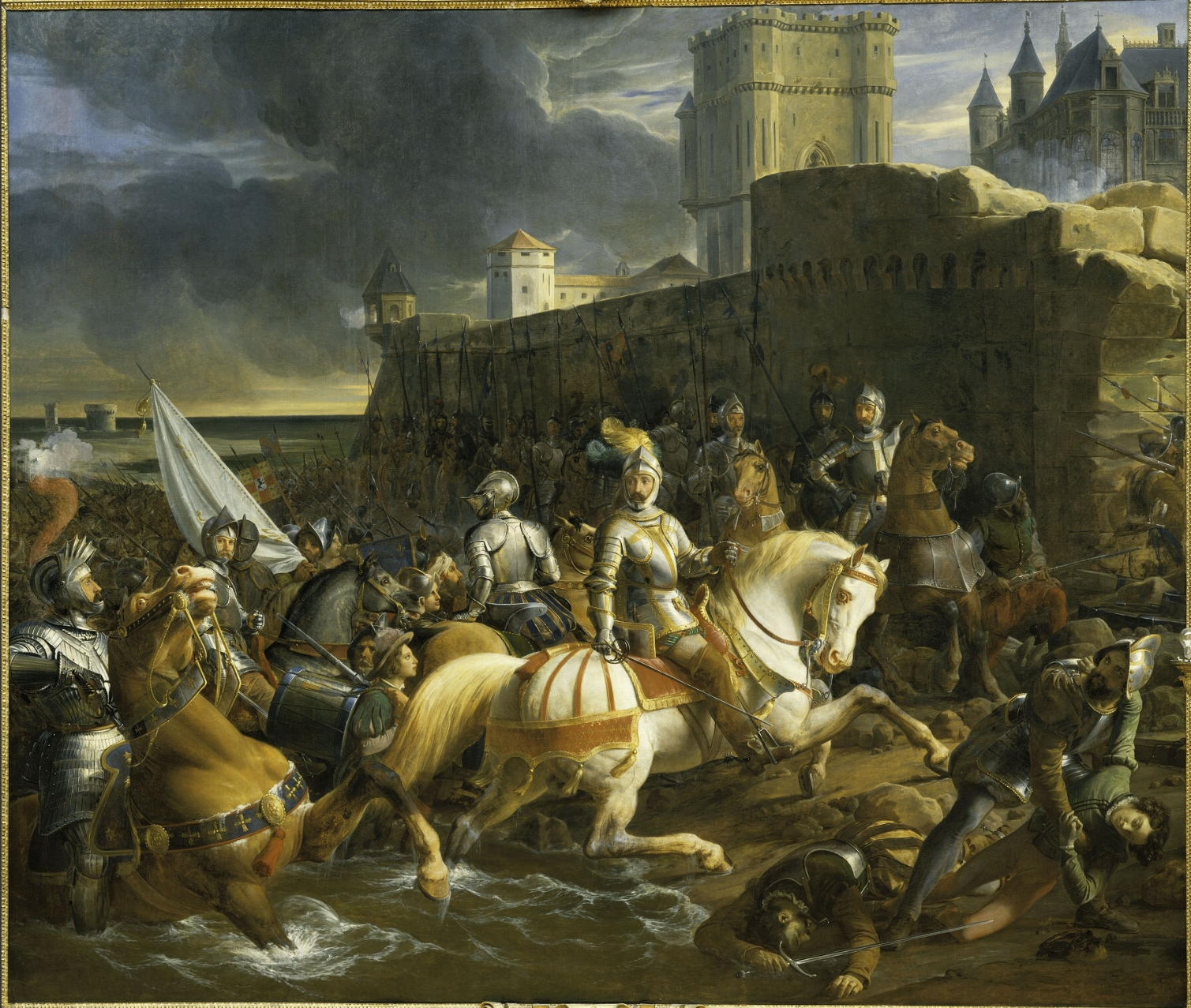
The Siege of Calais by François-Édouard Picot, 1838. Francis, Duke of Guise at the Siege of Calais

Louis mounted another invasion of Milan, but was defeated at the Battle of Novara, which was quickly followed by a series of Holy League victories at La Motta, Guinegate, and Flodden, in which the French, Venetian, and Scottish forces were decisively defeated. However, the death of Pope Julius left the League without effective leadership, and when Louis' successor, Francis I, defeated the Swiss at Marignano in 1515, the League collapsed, and by the treaties of Noyon and Brussels, surrendered to France and Venice the entirety of northern Italy.

The elevation of Charles of Spain to Holy Roman Emperor, a position that Francis had desired, led to a collapse of relations between France and the Habsburgs. In 1519, a Spanish invasion of Navarre, nominally a French fief, provided Francis with a pretext for starting a general war; French forces flooded into Italy and began a campaign to drive Charles from Naples. The French were outmatched, however, by the fully developed Spanish tercio tactics, and suffered a series of crippling defeats at Bicocca and Sesia against Spanish troops under Fernando d'Avalos. With Milan itself threatened, Francis personally led a French army into Lombardy in 1525, only to be defeated and captured at the Battle of Pavia; imprisoned in Madrid, Francis was forced to agree to extensive concessions over his Italian territories in the "Treaty of Madrid" (1526).

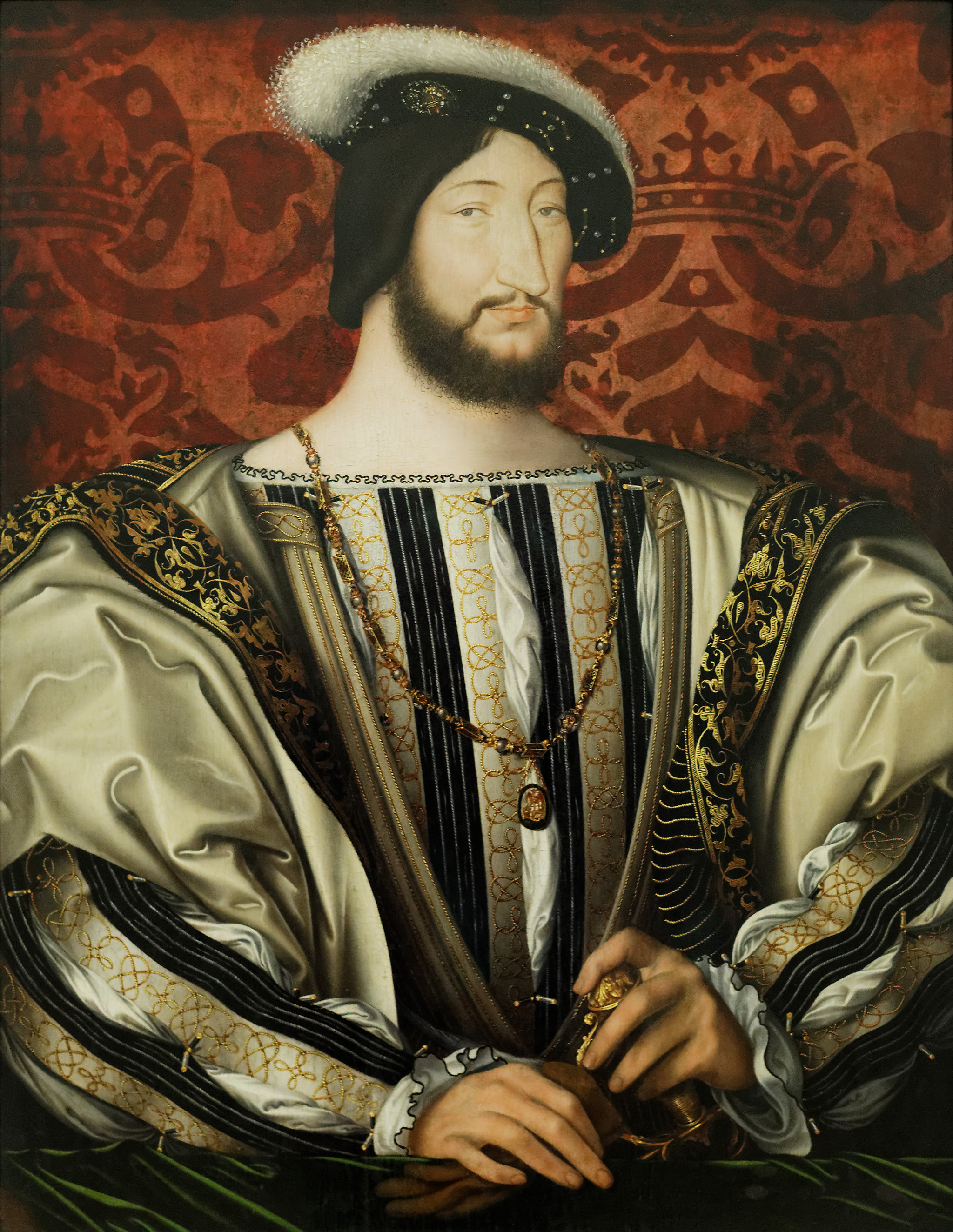
Francis I (r. 1515–1547, painted by Jean Clouet)

The inconclusive third war between Charles and Francis began with the death of Francesco II Sforza, the duke of Milan. When Charles' son Philip inherited the duchy, Francis invaded Italy, capturing Turin, but failed to take Milan. In response, Charles invaded Provence, advancing to Aix-en-Provence, but withdrew to Spain rather than attacking the heavily fortified Avignon. The Truce of Nice ended the war, leaving Turin in French hands but effecting no significant change in the map of Italy. Francis, allying himself with Suleiman I of the Ottoman Empire, launched a final invasion of Italy. A Franco-Ottoman fleet captured the city of Nice in August 1543, and laid siege to the citadel. The defenders were relieved within a month. The French, under François, Count d'Enghien, defeated an Imperial army at the Battle of Ceresole in 1544, but the French failed to penetrate further into Lombardy. Charles and Henry VIII of England then proceeded to invade northern France, seizing Boulogne and Soissons. A lack of cooperation between the Spanish and English armies, coupled with increasingly aggressive Ottoman attacks, led Charles to abandon these conquests, restoring the status quo once again.

In 1547, Henry II of France, who had succeeded Francis to the throne, declared war against Charles with the intent of recapturing Italy and ensuring French, rather than Habsburg, domination of European affairs. An early offensive against Lorraine was successful, but the attempted French invasion of Tuscany in 1553 was defeated at the Battle of Marciano. Charles's abdication in 1556 split the Habsburg empire between Philip II of Spain and Ferdinand I, and shifted the focus of the war to Flanders, where Philip, in conjunction with Emmanuel Philibert, Duke of Savoy, defeated the French at St. Quentin. England's entry into the war later that year led to the French capture of Calais, England's last possession on the French mainland, and French armies plundered Spanish possessions in the Low Countries; but Henry was nonetheless forced to accept the Peace of Cateau-Cambrésis, in which he renounced any further claims to Italy.

=== The Wars of Religion ===
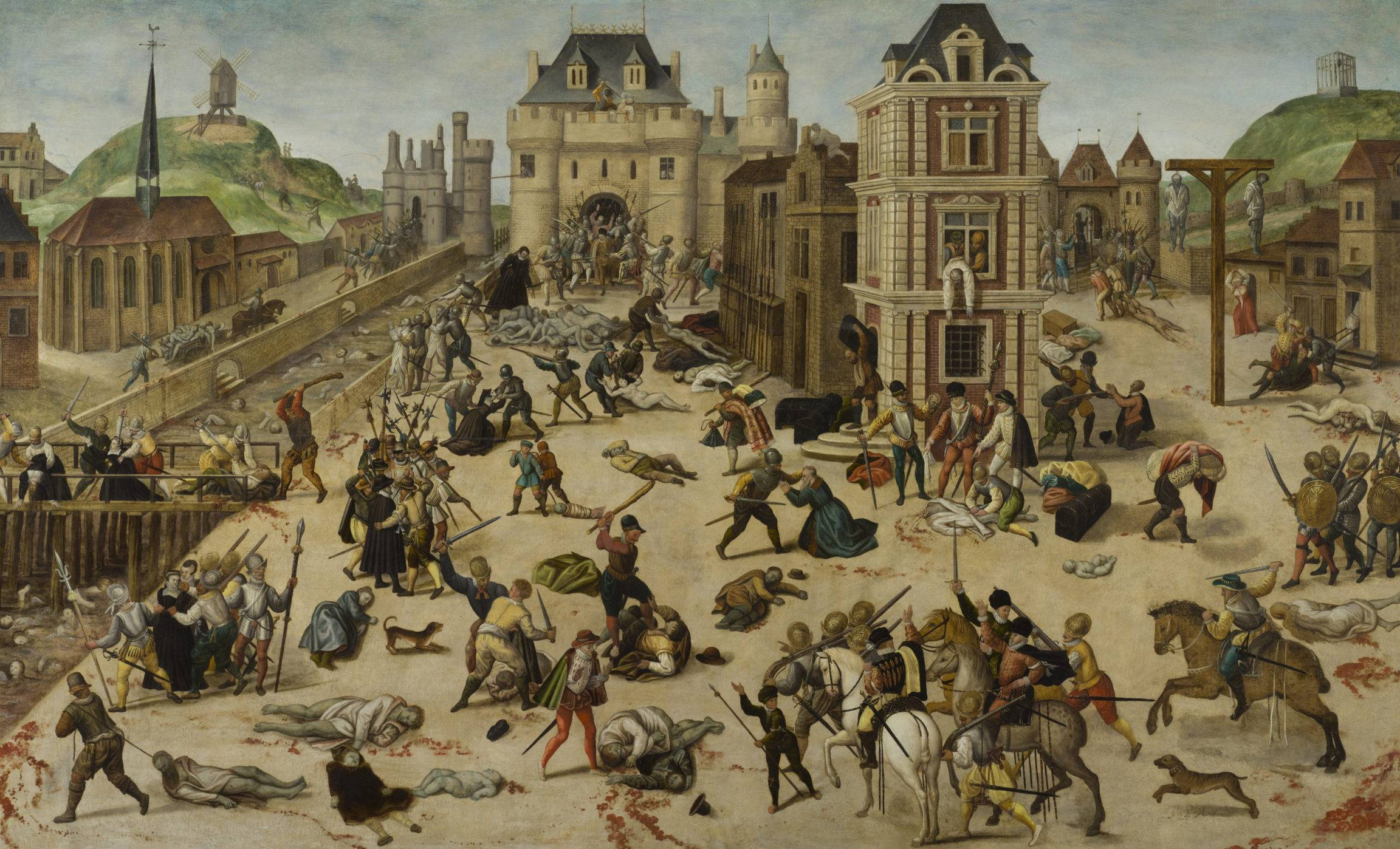
The St. Bartholomew's Day massacre of French Protestants in 1572

Barely were the Italian Wars over, when France was plunged into a domestic crisis with far-reaching consequences. Despite the conclusion of a Concordat between France and the Papacy (1516), granting the crown unrivalled power in senior ecclesiastical appointments, France was deeply affected by the Protestant Reformation's attempt to break the unity of Roman Catholic Europe. A growing urban-based Protestant minority (later dubbed Huguenots) faced ever harsher repression under the rule of Francis I's son King Henry II. After Henry II's unfortunate death in a joust, the country was ruled by his widow Catherine de' Medici and her sons Francis II, Charles IX and Henry III. Renewed Catholic reaction headed by the powerful dukes of Guise culminated in a massacre of Huguenots (1562), starting the first of the French Wars of Religion, during which English, German, and Spanish forces intervened on the side of rival Protestant and Catholic forces. Opposed to absolute monarchy, the Huguenots Monarchomachs theorized during this time the right of rebellion and the legitimacy of tyrannicide.

The Wars of Religion culminated in the War of the Three Henrys in which Henry III assassinated Henry de Guise, leader of the Spanish-backed Catholic league, and the king was murdered in return. After the assassination of both Henry of Guise (1588) and Henry III (1589), the conflict was ended by the accession of the Protestant king of Navarre as Henry IV (first king of the Bourbon dynasty) and his subsequent abandonment of Protestantism (Expedient of 1592) effective in 1593, his acceptance by most of the Catholic establishment (1594) and by the Pope (1595), and his issue of the toleration decree known as the Edict of Nantes (1598), which guaranteed freedom of private worship and civil equality.

=== France in the 17th and 18th centuries ===
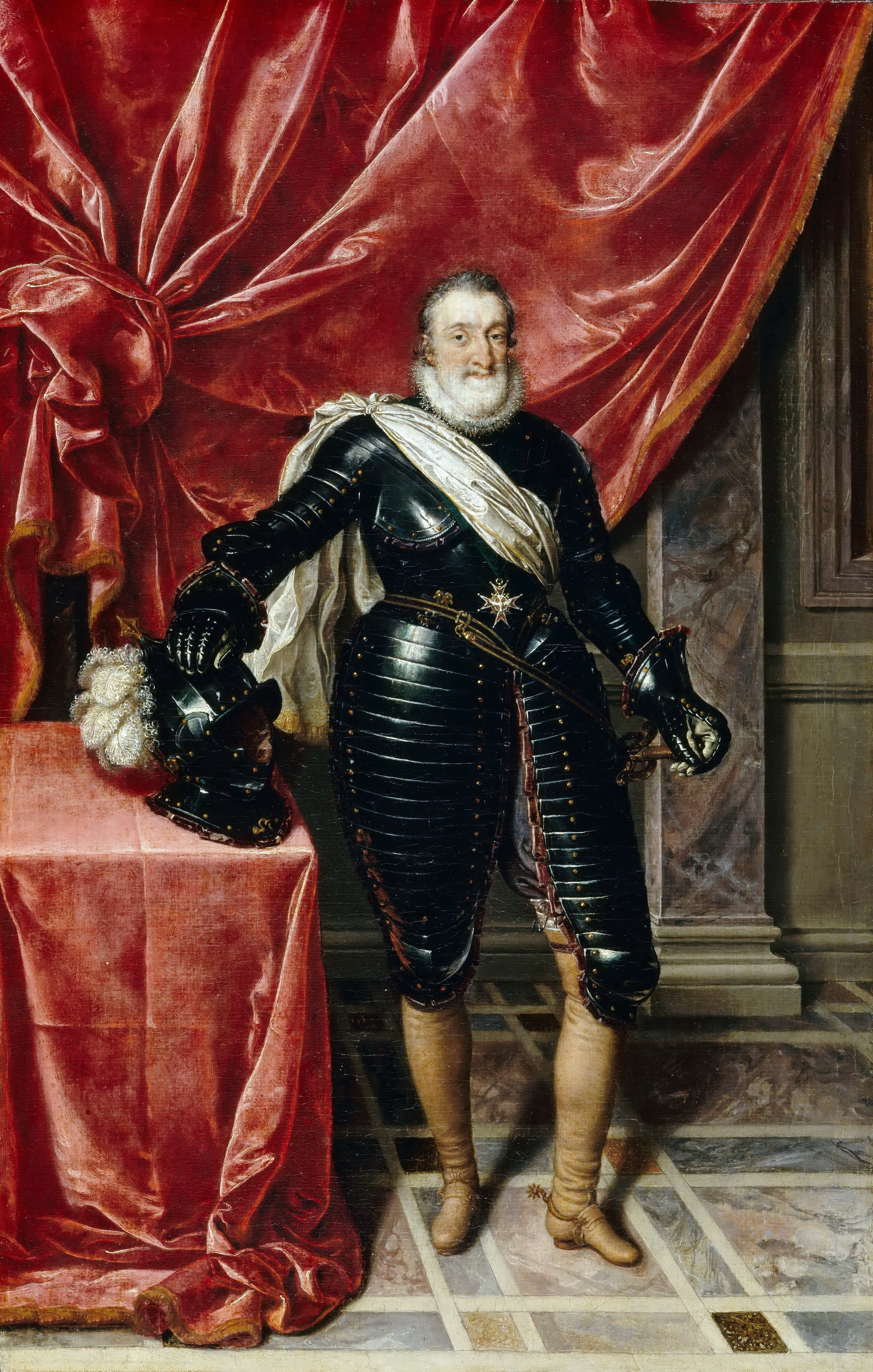
Henry IV (painted by Frans Pourbus the younger)

France's pacification under Henry IV laid much of the ground for the beginnings of France's rise to European hegemony. One of the most admired French kings, Henry was fatally stabbed by a Catholic fanatic in 1610 as war with Spain threatened. Troubles gradually developed during the regency headed by his queen Marie de Medici. France was expansive during all but the end of the 17th century: the French began trading in India and Madagascar, founded Quebec and penetrated the North American Great Lakes and Mississippi, established plantation economies in the West Indies and extended their trade contacts in the Levant and enlarged their merchant marine.

Henry IV's son Louis XIII and his minister (1624–1642) Cardinal Richelieu, elaborated a policy against Spain and the German emperor during the Thirty Years' War (1618–1648) which had broken out among the lands of Germany's Holy Roman Empire. An English-backed Huguenot rebellion (1625–1628) defeated, France intervened directly (1635) in the wider European conflict following her ally (Protestant) Sweden's failure to build upon initial success.

After the death of both king and cardinal, the Peace of Westphalia (1648) secured universal acceptance of Germany's political and religious fragmentation, but the Regency of Anne of Austria and her minister Cardinal Mazarin experienced a civil uprising known as the Fronde (1648–1653) which expanded into a Franco-Spanish War (1653–1659). The Treaty of the Pyrenees (1659) formalised France's seizure (1642) of the Spanish territory of Roussillon after the crushing of the ephemeral Catalan Republic and ushered a short period of peace.

For most of the reign of Louis XIV (1643–1715), France was the dominant power in Europe, aided by the diplomacy of Richelieu's successor (1642–1661) Cardinal Mazarin and the economic policies (1661–1683) of Colbert. Colbert's attempts to promote economic growth and the creation of new industries were not a great success, and France did not undergo any sort of industrial revolution during Louis XIV's reign. Indeed, much of the French countryside during this period remained poor and overpopulated. The resistance of peasants to adopt the potato, according to some monarchist apologists, and other new agricultural innovations while continuing to rely on cereal crops led to repeated catastrophic famines long after they had ceased in the rest of Western Europe. Prior to Louis XIV's reign, French soldiers frequently went into battle barefoot and with no weapons. On the other hand, France's high birthrate until the 18th century proved beneficial to its rulers since it meant the country could field larger armies than its neighbors. In fact, the king's foreign policy, as well as his lavish court and construction projects, left the country in enormous debt. The Palace of Versailles was criticized as overly extravagant even while it was still under construction, but dozens of imitations were built across Europe. Renewed war (the War of Devolution 1667–1668 and the Franco-Dutch War 1672–1678) brought further territorial gains (Artois and western Flanders and the free county of Burgundy, left to the Empire in 1482), but at the cost of the increasingly concerted opposition of rival powers.

Louis XIV King of France and of Navarre (painted by Hyacinthe Rigaud, 1701)

French culture was part of French hegemony. In the early part of the century French painters had to go to Rome to shed their provinciality (Nicolas Poussin, Claude Lorrain), but Simon Vouet brought home the taste for a classicized baroque that would characterise the French Baroque, epitomised in the Académie de peinture et de sculpture, in the painting of Charles Le Brun and the sculpture of François Girardon. With the Palais du Luxembourg, the Château de Maisons and Vaux-le-Vicomte, French classical architecture was admired abroad even before the creation of Versailles or Perrault's Louvre colonnade. Parisian salon culture set standards of discriminating taste from the 1630s, and with Pascal, Descartes, Bayle, Corneille, Racine and Molière, France became the cultural center of Europe. In an effort to prevent the nobility from revolting and challenging his authority, Louis implemented an extremely elaborate system of court etiquette with the idea that learning it would occupy most of the nobles' time and they could not plan rebellion. By the start of the 18th century, the nobility in France had been effectively neutered and would never again have more power than the crown. Also, Louis willingly granted titles of nobility to those who had performed distinguished service to the state so that it did not become a closed caste and it was possible for commoners to rise through the social ranks. The king sought to impose total religious uniformity on the country, repealing the Edict of Nantes in 1685. The infamous practice of dragonnades was adopted, whereby rough soldiers were quartered in the homes of Protestant families and allowed to have their way with them. Scores of Protestants fled France, costing the country a great many intellectuals, artisans, and other valuable people. Persecution extended to unorthodox Catholics like the Jansenists, a group that denied free will and had already been condemned by the popes. Louis was no theologian and understood little of the complex doctrines of Jansenism, satisfying himself with the fact that they threatened the unity of the state. In this, he garnered the friendship of the papacy, which had previously been hostile to France because of its policy of putting all church property in the country under the jurisdiction of the state rather than of Rome.

Cardinal Mazarin oversaw the creation of a French navy that rivaled England's, expanding it from 25 ships to almost 200. The size of the army was also considerably increased.

Starting in the 1670s, Louis XIV established the so-called Chambers of Reunion, courts in which judges would determine whether certain Habsburg territories belonged rightfully to France. The king was relying on the somewhat vague wording in the Treaty of Westphalia, while also dredging up older French claims, some dating back to medieval times. Through this, he concluded that the strategically important imperial city of Strassburg should have gone to France in 1648. In September 1681, French troops occupied the city, which was at once strongly fortified. As the imperial armies were then busy fighting the Ottoman Empire, they could not do anything about this for a number of years. The basic aim of Louis' foreign policy was to give France more easily defensible borders, and to eliminate weak spots (Strassburg had often been used by the Habsburgs as a gateway into France).

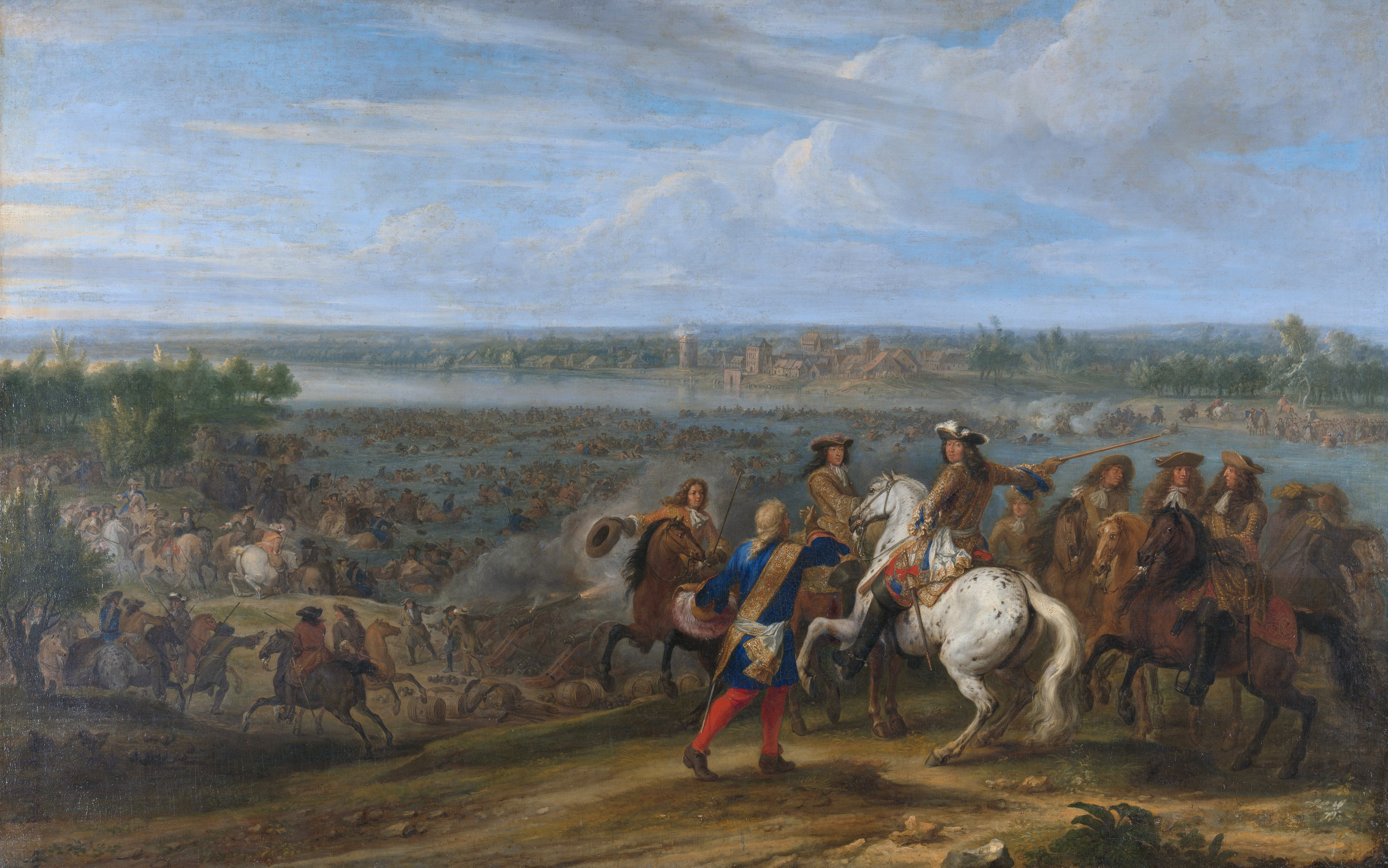
French invasion of the Netherlands, which Louis XIV initiated in 1672, starting the Franco-Dutch War

Following the Whig establishment on the English and Scottish thrones by the Dutch prince William of Orange in 1688, the anti-French "Grand Alliance" of 1689 was established. With the Turks now in retreat, the emperor Leopold could turn his attention to France. The ensuing War of the Grand Alliance lasted from 1688 to 1697. France's resources were stretched to the breaking point by the cost of fielding an army of over 300,000 men and two naval squadrons. Famine in 1692–1693 killed up to two million people. The exhaustion of the powers brought the fighting to an end in 1697, by which time the French were in control of the Spanish Netherlands and Catalonia. However, Louis gave back his conquests and gained only Haiti. The French people, feeling that their sacrifices in the war had been for nothing, never forgave him.

The Battle of La Hougue (1692) was the decisive naval battle in the war and confirmed the durable dominance of the Royal Navy of England.

In November 1700, the severely ill Spanish king Charles II died, ending the Habsburg line in that country. Louis had long waited for this moment, and now planned to put a Bourbon relative, Philip, Duke of Anjou, on the throne. Essentially, Spain was to become an obedient satellite of France, ruled by a king who would carry out orders from Versailles. Realizing how this would upset the balance of power, the other European rulers were outraged. However, most of the alternatives were equally undesirable. For example, putting another Habsburg on the throne would end up recreating the empire of Charles V, which would also grossly upset the power balance. After nine years of exhausting war, the last thing Louis wanted was another conflict. However, the rest of Europe would not stand for his ambitions in Spain, and so the War of the Spanish Succession began, a mere three years after the War of the Grand Alliance.

The disasters of the war (accompanied by another famine) were so great that France was on the verge of collapse by 1709. In desperation, the king appealed to the French people to save their country, and in doing so gained thousands of new army recruits. Afterwards, his general Marshal Villars managed to drive back the allied forces. In 1714, the war ended with the treaties of Utrecht and Rastadt. France did not lose any territory, and there was no discussion of returning Flanders or Alsace to the Habsburgs. While the Duke of Anjou was accepted as King Philip V of Spain, this was done under the condition that the French and Spanish thrones never be united. Finally, France agreed to stop supporting Jacobite pretenders to the English throne. Just after the war ended, Louis died, having ruled France for 72 years.

While often considered a tyrant and a warmonger (especially in England), Louis XIV was not in any way a despot in the 20th-century sense. The traditional customs and institutions of France limited his power and in any case, communications were poor and no national police force existed.

Overall, the discontent and revolts of 16th- and 17th-century France did not approach the conditions that led to 1789. Events such as the Frondes were a naïve, unrevolutionary discontent and the people did not challenge the right of the king to govern nor did they question the Church.

The reign (1715–1774) of Louis XV saw an initial return to peace and prosperity under the regency (1715–1723) of Philip II, Duke of Orléans, whose policies were largely continued (1726–1743) by Cardinal Fleury, prime minister in all but name. The exhaustion of Europe after two major wars resulted in a long period of peace, only interrupted by minor conflicts like the War of the Polish Succession from 1733 to 1735. Large-scale warfare resumed with the War of the Austrian Succession (1740–1748). But alliance with the traditional Habsburg enemy (the "Diplomatic Revolution" of 1756) against the rising power of Britain and Prussia led to costly failure in the Seven Years' War (1756–1763) and the loss of France's North American colonies.

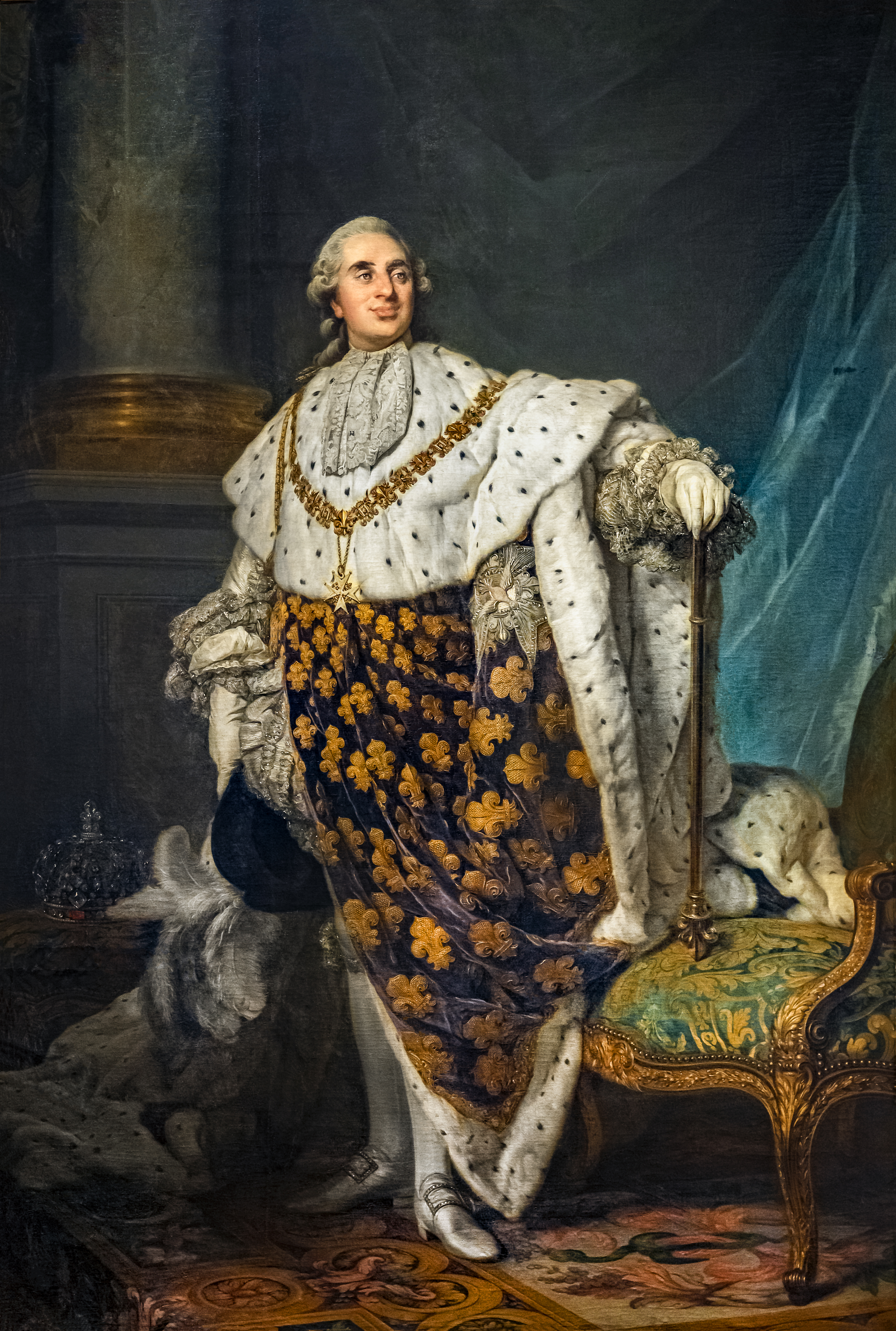
Louis XVI Last King of Early France. Portrait of Louis XVI by Joseph Duplessis (1776).

On the whole, the 18th century saw growing discontent with the monarchy and the established order. Louis XV was a highly unpopular king for his sexual excesses, overall weakness, and for losing Canada to the British. A strong ruler like Louis XIV could enhance the position of the monarchy, while Louis XV weakened it. The writings of the philosophers such as Voltaire were a clear sign of discontent, but the king chose to ignore them. He died of smallpox in 1774, and the French people shed few tears at his passing. While France had not yet experienced the industrial revolution that was beginning in England, the rising middle class of the cities felt increasingly frustrated with a system and rulers that seemed silly, frivolous, aloof, and antiquated, even if true feudalism no longer existed in France.

Anti-establishment ideas fermented in 18th-century France in part due to the country's relative egalitarianism. While less liberal than England during the same period, the French monarchy never approached the absolutism of the eastern rulers in Vienna, Berlin, St. Petersburg, and Constantinople in part because the country's traditional development as a decentralized, feudal society acted as a restraint on the power of the king. Different social classes in France each had their own unique set of privileges so that no one class could completely dominate the others.

Upon Louis XV's death, his grandson Louis XVI became king. Initially popular, he too came to be widely detested by the 1780s. Again a weak ruler, he was married to an Austrian archduchess, Marie Antoinette, whose naïvety and cloistered/alienated Versailles life permitted ignorance of the true extravagance and wasteful use of borrowed money (Marie Antoinette was significantly more frugal than her predecessors). French intervention in the US War of Independence was also very expensive.

With the country deeply in debt, Louis XVI permitted the radical reforms of Turgot and Malesherbes, but noble disaffection led to Turgot's dismissal and Malesherbes' resignation in 1776. They were replaced by Jacques Necker. Necker had resigned in 1781 to be replaced by Calonne and Brienne, before being restored in 1788. A harsh winter that year led to widespread food shortages, and by then France was a powder keg ready to explode.

On the eve of the French Revolution of 1789, France was in a profound institutional and financial crisis, but the ideas of the Enlightenment had begun to permeate the educated classes of society.

On 1792 September 21 the French monarchy was effectively abolished by the proclamation of the French First Republic.

=== Monarchs ===
Royal banner in presence of the Royal family of the Kingdom of France

Valois (1328–1498)

- Louis XI
- Charles VIII

After Charles VIII the Affable, the last king in the direct Valois line, three other branches of the House of Capet reigned in France until the fall of the Ancien Régime in 1792:

Valois-Orléans (1498–1515)

- Louis XII

Valois-Angoulême (1515–1589)

- Francis I
- Henry II and Catherine de' Medici
- Francis II
- Charles IX
- Henry III

House of Bourbon (1589–1792)

- Henry IV
- the Regency of Marie de Medici
- Louis XIII and his minister Cardinal Richelieu
- the Regency of Anne of Austria and her minister Cardinal Mazarin
- Louis XIV
- the Régence of Philip II of Orleans
- Louis XV
- Louis XVI

== Social history ==
France in the Ancien Régime covered a territory of around 200,000 square miles (520,000 km^{2}), and supported 22 million people in 1700. At least 96% of the population were peasants. France had the largest population in Europe, with European Russia second at 20 million. Britain had nearly six million, Spain had eight million, and the Austrian Habsburgs had around eight million. France's lead slowly faded after 1700, as other countries grew faster.

=== Rural society ===
In the 17th century rich peasants who had ties to the market economy provided much of the capital investment necessary for agricultural growth, and frequently moved from village to village (or town). Geographic mobility, directly tied to the market and the need for investment capital, was the main path to social mobility. The "stable" core of French society, town guilds people and village laboureurs, included cases of staggering social and geographic continuity, but even this core required regular renewal. Accepting the existence of these two societies, the constant tension between them, and extensive geographic and social mobility tied to a market economy holds the key to a clearer understanding of the evolution of the social structure, economy, and even political system of early modern France. Collins (1991) argues that the Annales School paradigm underestimated the role of the market economy; failed to explain the nature of capital investment in the rural economy; and grossly exaggerated social stability.

=== Women and families ===
Very few women held any power—some queens did, as did the heads of Catholic convents. In the Enlightenment, the writings of philosopher Jean-Jacques Rousseau gave a political program for reform of the Ancien Régime, founded on a reform of domestic mores. Rousseau's conception of the relations between private and public spheres is more unified than that found in modern sociology. Rousseau argued that the domestic role of women is a structural precondition for a "modern" society. Within early modern society, women of urban artisanal classes participated in a range of public activities and also shared work settings with men (even though they were generally disadvantaged in terms of tasks, wages and access to property.) Salic law prohibited women from rule; however, the laws for the case of a regency, when the king was too young to govern by himself, brought the queen into the center of power. The queen could assure the passage of power from one king to another—from her late husband to her young son—while simultaneously assuring the continuity of the dynasty.

==== Education for girls ====
Educational aspirations were on the rise and were becoming increasingly institutionalized in order to supply the church and state with the functionaries to serve as their future administrators. Girls were schooled too, but not to assume political responsibility. Girls were ineligible for leadership positions and were generally considered to have an inferior intellect to their brothers. France had many small local schools where working-class children—both boys and girls—learned to read, the better "to know, love and serve God". The sons and daughters of the noble and bourgeois elites, however, were given quite distinct educations: boys were sent to upper school, perhaps a university, while their sisters (if they were lucky enough to leave the house) were sent for finishing at a convent. The Enlightenment challenged this model, but no real alternative presented itself for female education. Only through education at home were knowledgeable women formed, usually to the sole end of dazzling their salons.

==== Stepfamilies ====
A large proportion of children lived in broken homes or in blended families and had to cope with the presence of half-siblings and stepsiblings in the same residence. Brothers and sisters were often separated during the guardianship period and some of them were raised in different places for most of their childhood. Half-siblings and stepsiblings lived together for rather short periods of time because of their difference in age, their birth rank, or their gender. The lives of the children were closely linked to the administration of their heritage: when both their mothers and fathers were dead, another relative took charge of the guardianship and often removed the children from a stepparent's home, thus separating half-siblings.

The experience of step-motherhood was surrounded by negative stereotypes; the Cinderella story and many other jokes and stories made the second wife an object of ridicule. Language, theater, popular sayings, the position of the Church, and the writings of jurists all made stepmother a difficult identity to take up. However, the importance of male remarriage suggests that reconstitution of family units was a necessity and that individuals resisted negative perceptions circulating through their communities. Widowers did not hesitate to take a second wife, and they usually found quite soon a partner willing to become a stepmother. For these women, being a stepmother was not necessarily the experience of a lifetime or what defined their identity. Their experience depended greatly on factors such as the length of the union, changing family configuration, and financial dispositions taken by their husbands.

By a policy adopted at the beginning of the 16th century, adulterous women during the ancien régime were sentenced to a lifetime in a convent unless pardoned by their husbands and were rarely allowed to remarry even if widowed.

== Religion ==
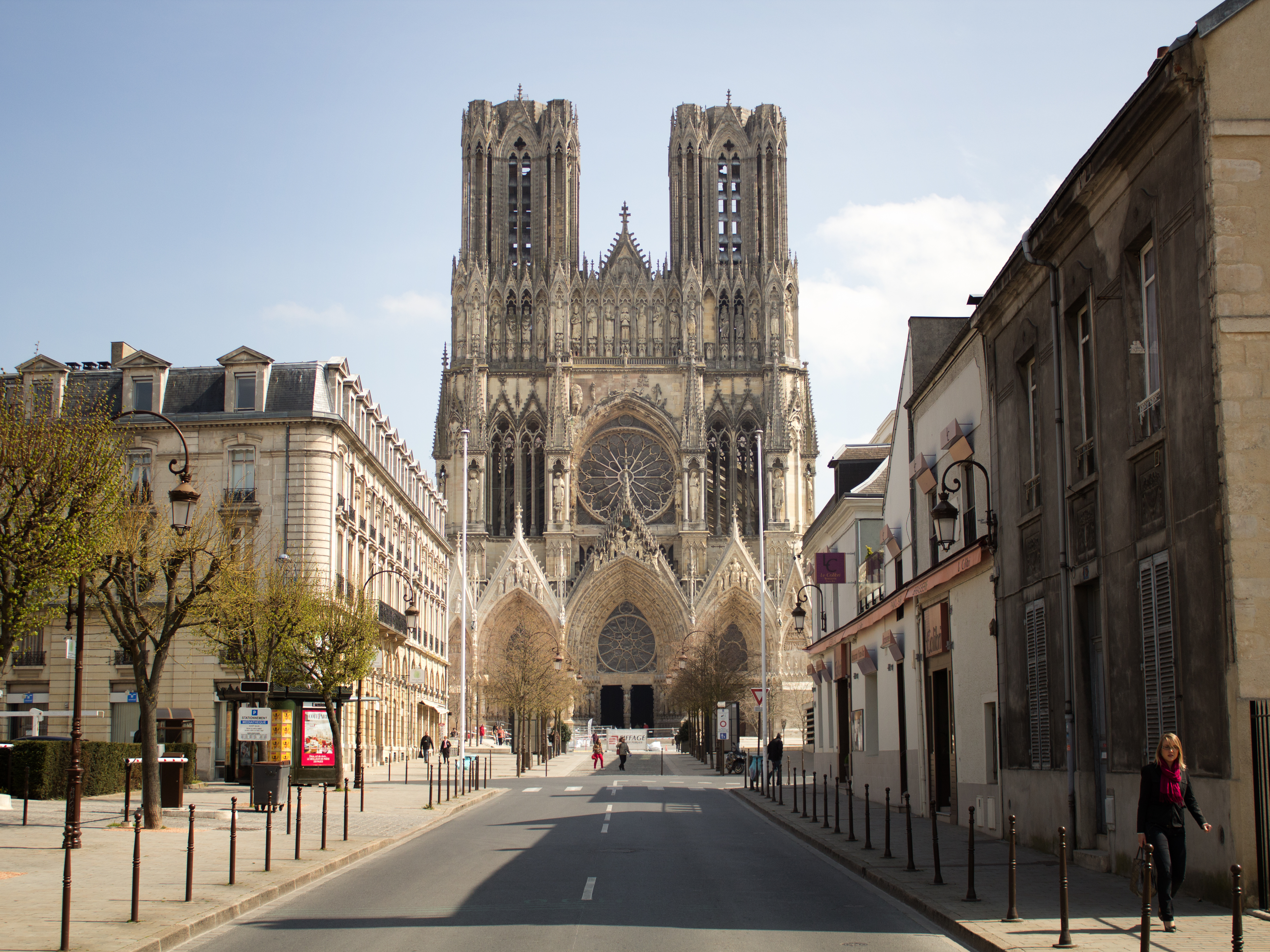
The Reims Cathedral, built on the site where Clovis I was baptised by Remigius, functioned as the site for the coronation of the Kings of France.

Prior to the French Revolution, the Catholic Church was the official state religion of the Kingdom of France. France was traditionally considered the Church's eldest daughter (French: Fille aînée de l'Église), and the King of France always maintained close links to the Pope. However, the French monarchy maintained a significant degree of autonomy, namely through its policy of "Gallicanism", whereby the king selected bishops rather than the papacy.

During the Protestant Reformation of the mid 16th century, France developed a large and influential Protestant population, primarily of Reformed confession; after French theologian and pastor John Calvin introduced the Reformation in France, the number of French Protestants (Huguenots) steadily swelled to 10 percent of the population, or roughly 1.8 million people. The ensuring French Wars of Religion, and particularly the St. Bartholomew's Day massacre, decimated the Huguenot community; Protestants declined to seven to eight percent of the kingdom's population by the end of the 16th century. The Edict of Nantes brought decades of respite until its revocation in the late 17th century by Louis XIV. The resulting exodus of Huguenots from the Kingdom of France created a brain drain, as many of them had occupied important places in society.

== French exploration and colonies ==
- Age of Discovery
- French colonization of the Americas
- French colonial empires

== Literature ==
- French Renaissance literature
- French literature of the 17th century
- French literature of the 18th century

== Art ==
- French Renaissance
- French Baroque and Classicism
- French Rococo and Neoclassicism

== See also ==
- French Enlightenment
- Paris in the 17th century
- Paris in the 18th century
