= Anglo-French War (1557–1559) =

Part of the Anglo-French Wars

Anglo-French War (1557-1559)
- Part of the Italian War of 1551–1559
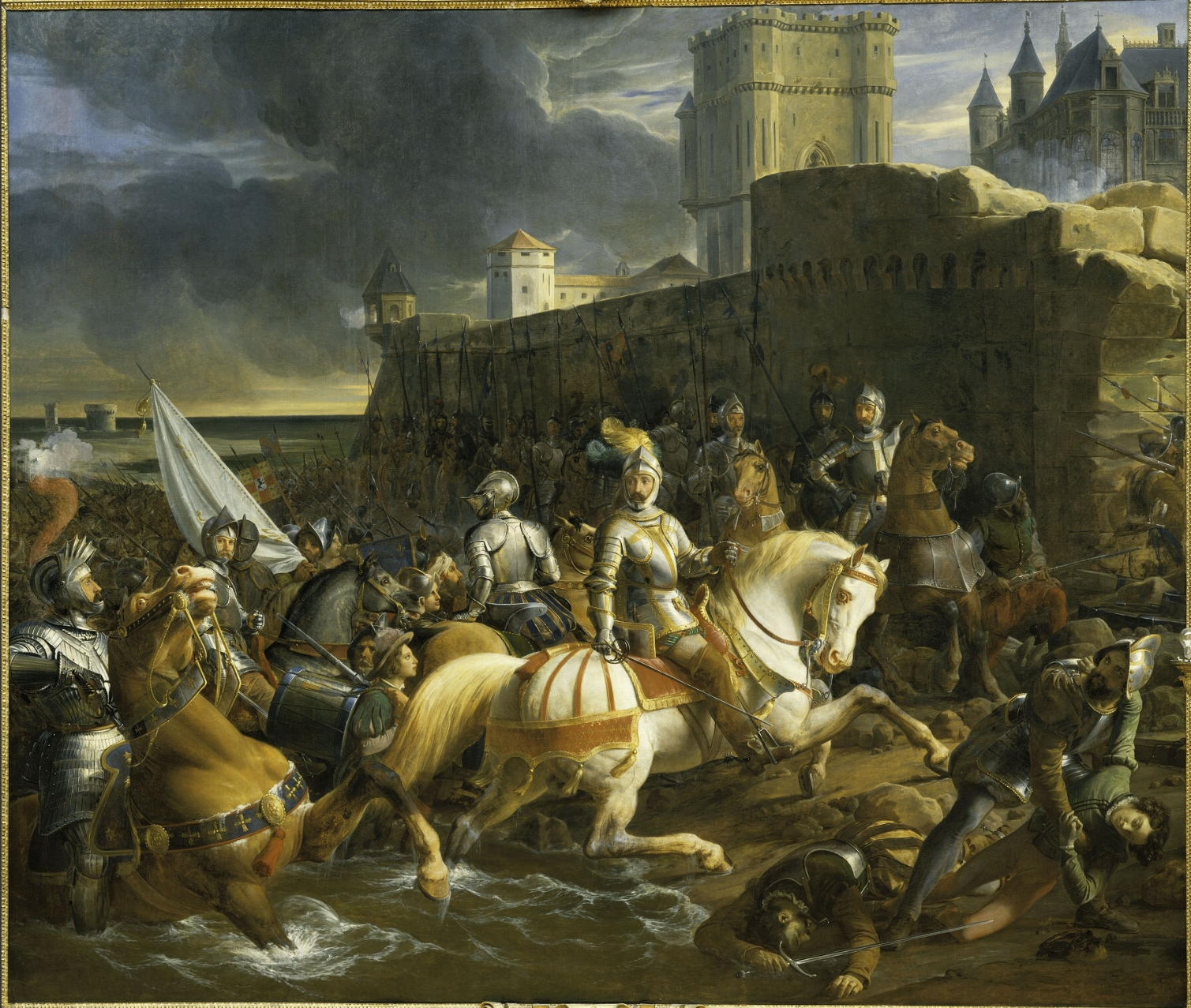
- The Siege of Calais by François-Édouard Picot, 1838
Date	1557–1559
Location	Mainly Calais
Result	French victory: French conquest of the Pale of Calais

Belligerents
Kingdom of France	Kingdom of England

Commanders and leaders
Henry II of France; Francis, Duke of Guise	(Kingdom of England) Mary I; (Kingdom of England) Thomas Wentworth, 2nd Baron Wentworth

The Anglo-French War was part of the Italian War of 1551–1559, and lasted from 1557 to 1559. Following the French defeat at the Battle of St. Quentin in August 1557, England entered the war. The French laid Siege to Calais in response. Following failure in mid-1557, a renewed attack captured the outlying forts of Nieullay and Rysbank and Calais was besieged.

== Events ==
On 1 January 1558, the French vanguard invested Sangatte and Fréthun Nielles, and the Army Corps reduced Fort Risban the next day. On 3 January, the artillery moved into Fort Nieulay at Rysbank. Thomas, Lord Wentworth, completely overwhelmed by a lightning attack, handed the keys of the city to the French on 7 January. The booty taken by the French was more than they had hoped for: food for three months and nearly 300 guns.

The English defences of Guînes and Hames soon also fell. Henry II of France arrived at Calais on 23 January 1558. France had reconquered the last territory it had lost in the Hundred Years' War and put an end to two centuries of fighting between England and France. The new French administration made a particularly efficient demarcation of the border, created a new division of farmland, reorganized the 24 parishes, and reconstructed villages and churches. No harm came to the English residents: after a rather uncomfortable night they were escorted to the waiting boats and given safe passage across the English Channel.

In England there was shock and disbelief at the loss of this final Continental territory. The story goes that a few months later Queen Mary, on her death bed, told her ladies: "When I am dead and cut open, they will find Philip and Calais inscribed on my heart."

== Result ==
The Peace of Cateau-Cambrésis (1559) confirmed that the French would retain their conquest of the Pale of Calais.
