= Siege of Calais (1558) =

1558 battle between England and France

Coordinates: 50.9636°N 1.8474°E

- Part of the Italian War of 1551–1559, Anglo-French War (1557–1559)
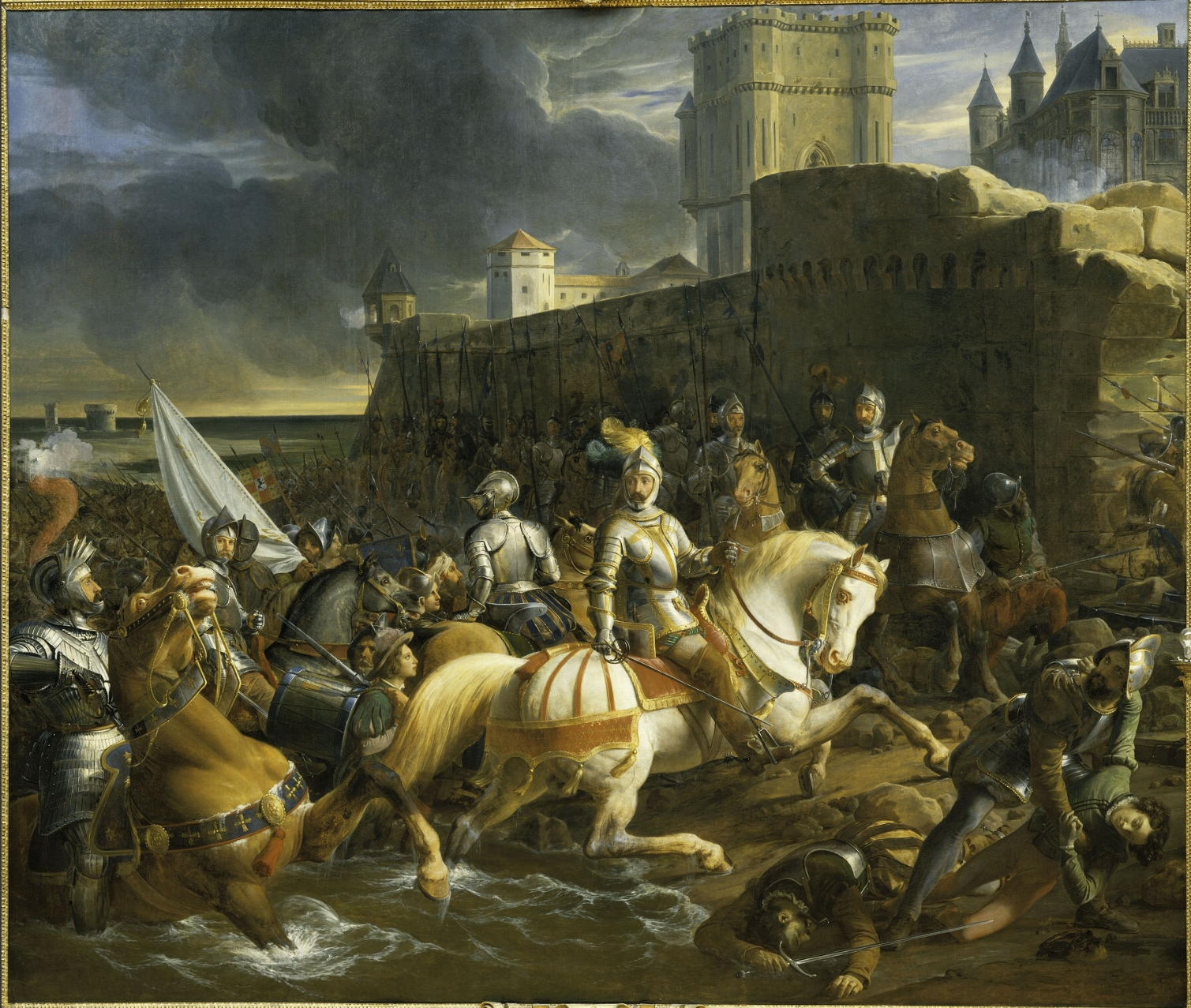
- The Siege of Calais by François-Édouard Picot, 1838
Date	1–8 January 1558
Location	Calais, France
Result	French victory
Territorial changes	France seizes Calais and its surroundings

Belligerents
Kingdom of France	Kingdom of England

Commanders and leaders
François, Duke of Guise	(Kingdom of England) Thomas Wentworth, 2nd Baron Wentworth

Strength
27,000	2,500

The French siege of Calais in early 1558 was part of the Italian War of 1551–1559 between France and England and their respective allies. It resulted in the seizure of the town and its dependencies by France.

The Pale of Calais had been ruled by England since 1347, during the Hundred Years' War. By the 1550s, England was ruled by Mary I and her husband Philip II of Spain. When the Kingdom of England supported a Spanish invasion of France, Henry II of France sent François, Duke of Guise, against English-held Calais, defended by Thomas Wentworth, 2nd Baron Wentworth. Following an initial failure in mid-1557, a renewed attack captured the outlying forts of Nieullay and Risbank from the English forces and Calais was besieged.

== Background ==
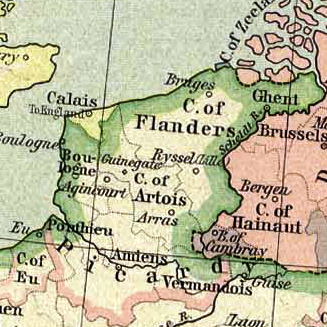
Map showing the situation of 1477, northern France and the pale of Calais.

The victory of Louis XI of France over Charles the Bold in 1477 and the annexation of Picardy to the French royal domain marked the end of a status quo over the possession of Calais. For nearly a century the House of Valois had preferred to turn their armies towards Italy, rich and technologically ahead of the rest of Europe, rather than take Calais. France had to fight the English on three occasions during the sixteenth century (1526, 1544, and 1547) when they attempted to extend the English possessions in Picardy.

At the behest of Pope Paul IV, in 1557 France put an end to the Truce of Vaucelles which concluded the tenth Italian war, and resumed hostilities in the Kingdom of Naples. In response, the crown of Spain returned to its customary strategy since the Battle of Ceresole: it again attacked in Picardy and inflicted a crushing defeat on the Constable of Montmorency at the Battle of St. Quentin (1557). Henry II of France had lost his best captains and the road to Paris was open to invasion. In these circumstances, François, Duke of Guise, who had raised an army and prepared to lead it in Italy, was recalled to Picardy and promoted to lieutenant-general of France. To avoid the intervention of an English expeditionary force, King Henry II of France arranged, in great secrecy, to attack Calais in the winter with 30,000 men assembled at Compiegne, Montreuil-sur-Mer, and Boulogne-sur-Mer.

The French continued to influence Calais after the Hundred Years War' due to the area simultaneously being a part of the diocese of Thérouanne until the diocese's abolition. Soon after the fall of the diocese, the French launched the siege.

== Capture of Calais ==
Lacking any natural barriers, Calais's continued English control depended on fortifications maintained and built up at some expense. Near Calais, the English garrison forces were frequently pitted against the French or Burgundian forces. Relieved by the long confrontation between Burgundy and France, English rule over Calais was able to flourish for 150 years. The French and the Burgundians each coveted the city, but preferred to see it under the English rather than their rival.

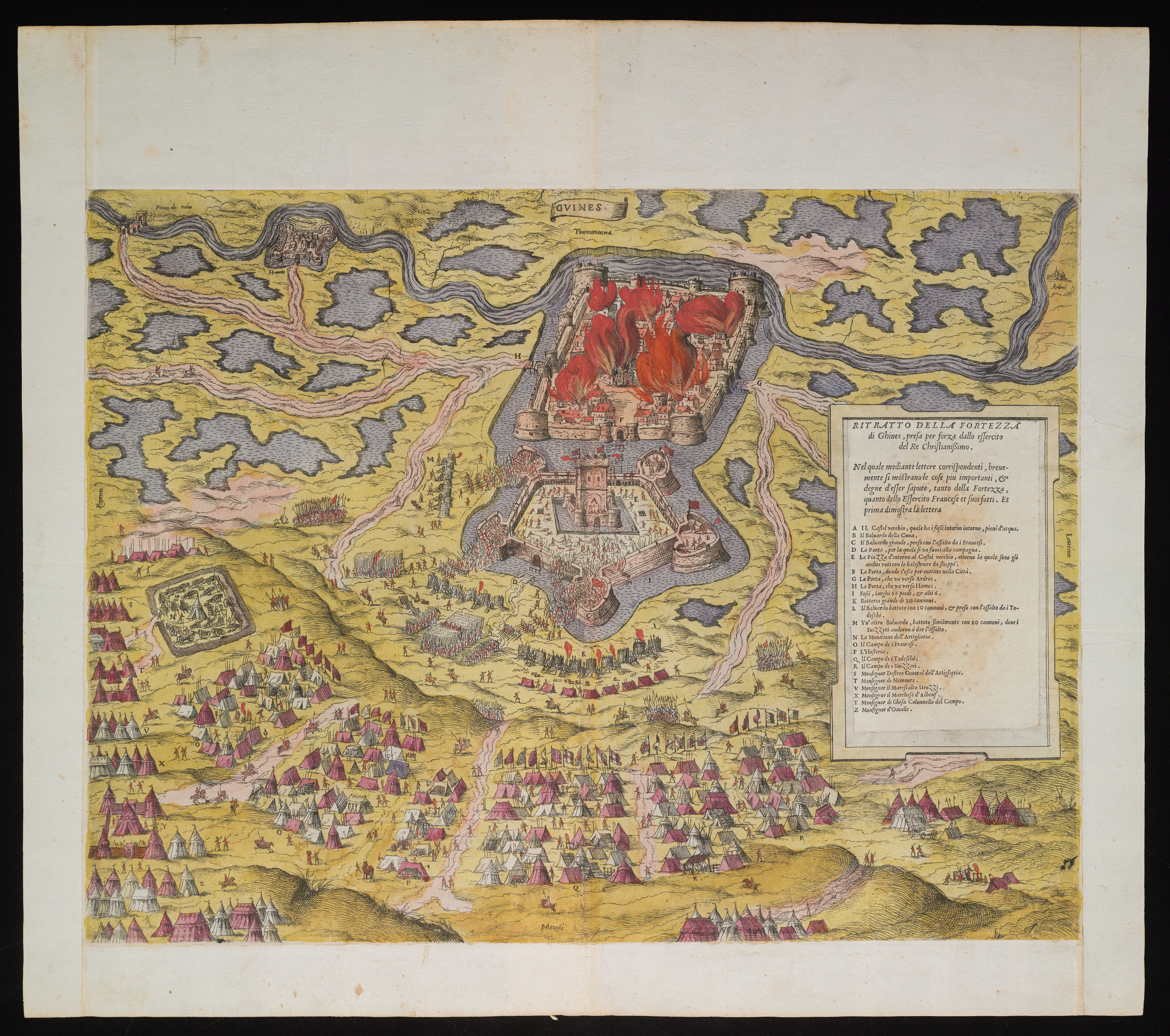
"Portrait of the fortress of Guînes, taken by force from the English by the army of the most Christian king." Print by Ulrico Hoepli

On 1 January 1558, the French vanguard invested Sangatte, Fréthun and Nielles, and the Army Corps reduced Fort Risban the next day. On 3 January, the artillery moved into Fort Nieulay at Risbank. Thomas, Lord Wentworth, completely overwhelmed by a lightning attack, handed the keys of the city to the French on 7 January. The booty taken by the French was more than they had hoped for: food for three months and nearly 300 guns. The English defences of Guînes and Hames soon also fell. Henry II of France arrived at Calais on 23 January 1558. France had reconquered the last territory it had lost in the Hundred Years' War and put an end to two centuries of fighting between England and France. The new French administration made a particularly efficient demarcation of the border, created a new division of farmland, reorganized the 24 parishes, and reconstructed villages and churches. No harm came to the English residents: after a rather uncomfortable night, they were escorted to waiting boats and given safe passage across the English Channel.

In England, there was shock and disbelief at the loss of this final Continental territory. The story goes that a few months later Queen Mary, on her death bed, told her ladies: "When I am dead and cut open, they will find Philip and Calais inscribed on my heart."

== Consequences ==
Lord Wentworth, the governor of the city, and the English inhabitants of the Pale of Calais returned to England. Calais was declared a "reclaimed land" to commemorate the restoration of French rule. François de Guise was able to strike back against the Spaniards, and during the summer of 1558 he attacked Thionville and Arlon; however, a combined Spanish-English force heavily defeated a French army under Paul de Thermes at Gravelines just a month later in July. Meanwhile, de Guise was about to invade Luxembourg when the treaties of Le Cateau were signed. Calais remained under French control. In April 1559, the Treaty of Cateau-Cambrésis between France and Spain (allied to England) included recognition of Calais as an English possession in temporary French custody pending a purchase price of half a million gold crowns to be paid by France in eight years' time.

However, in 1562 upon the outbreak of the French Wars of Religion, England's new queen, Elizabeth I, revived her kingdom's claims to Calais and occupied the French port of Le Havre in order to keep it until France should restore Calais. French forces ejected the English in 1563 and the Treaty of Troyes (1564) effectively recognized French ownership of Calais in exchange for payment to England of 120,000 crowns. Although the treaty made no mention of Calais, the French paid the 120,000 crowns in return for all rights to Le Havre and freedom of commerce was agreed between the two countries. The French believed that the English failure to maintain the occupation of Le Havre in return for Calais, meant the English had forfeited all rights to Calais and Elizabeth was in no position to press the case further.

The loss of the Pale of Calais, an integral part of England with representation in Parliament as well as being England's last remaining possession in continental Europe, was a tremendous blow to English prestige as well as being of immense personal loss to Queen Mary. However, it inflicted comparatively little damage on the English economy. England no longer had to maintain Calais's costly defences and garrison, and the English textile trade (though severely affected in the short term) recovered with its relocation to the Habsburg Netherlands. The historian David J. Wildman describes the loss of Calais as a 'Tudor Brexit', and that the loss of its last territorial foothold in Europe had the unintended consequence of forcing the English to look to the New World for economic opportunities.
