= Fort Risban =

Coordinates: 50.9637°N 1.8475°E

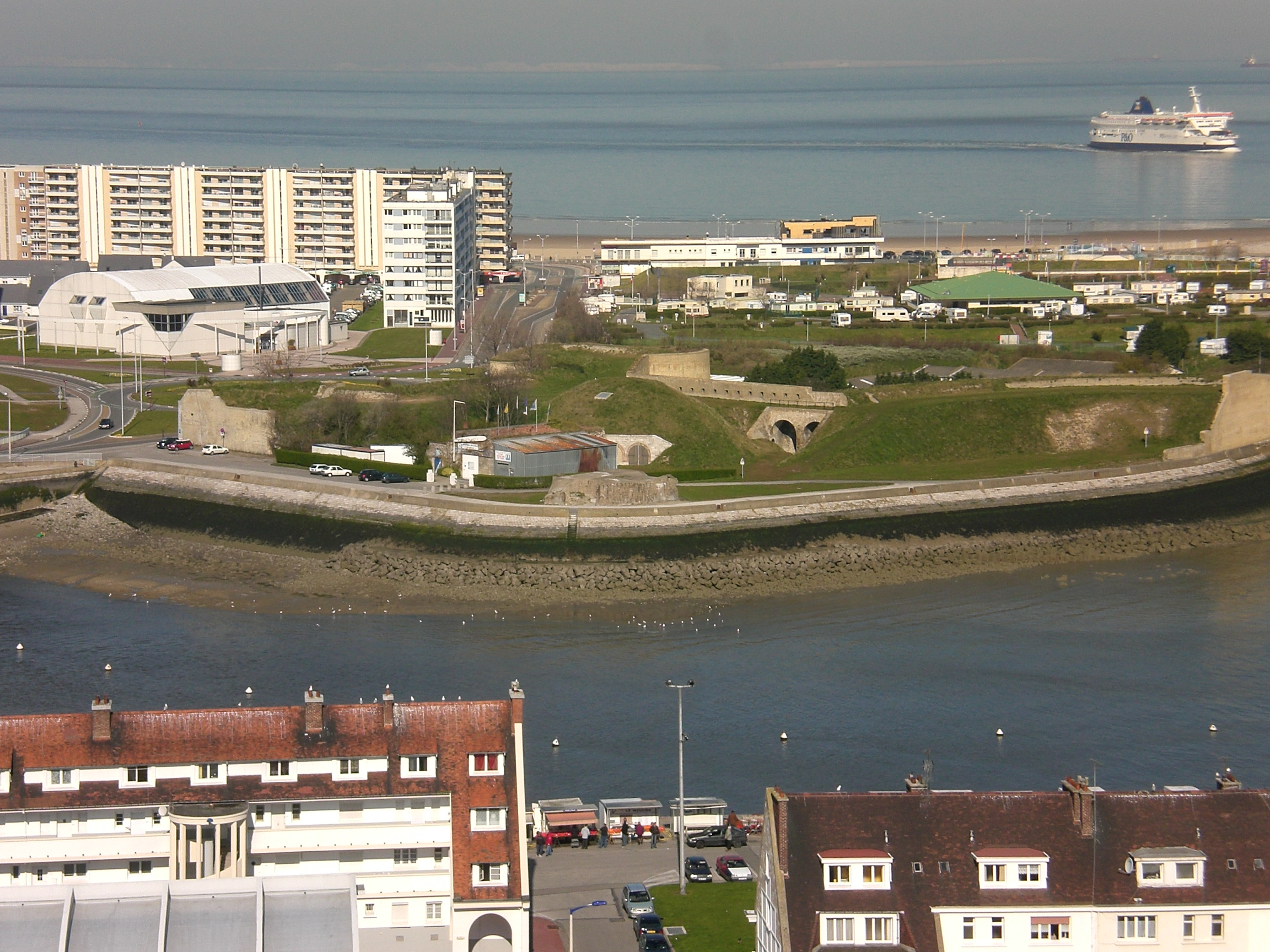
Fort Risban

Fort Risban is a fort in Calais, France, located on the coast on the Avenue Raymond Poincaré at the port entrance. In English medieval accounts, it is Risbanke or Risbank.

== History ==
The existence of the fort was first mentioned when Calais was besieged by the English in November 1346. Edward III of England's troops, finding the defences of Calais impenetrable, decided to erect a small fort to prevent any supplies from reaching the town by sea, to starve the inhabitants into submission. Under the English occupation the wooden tower was replaced by a stone structure, the Stone Tower, after 1400 renamed Lancaster Tower, a name often given to the fort itself.

Fort Risban was used by the English forces until 1558 when Calais was recaptured by France. In 1596, the fort was captured by the Spanish Netherlands until May 1598 when it was returned to the French following the Treaty of Vervins. It was rebuilt in 1640. Vauban, who visited the fort sometime in the 1680s, described it as "a home for owls, and place to hold the Sabbath" rather than a fortification and let the fortress be altered. In the 19th century, the Engineers Corps altered it again. The sea fortress was dismantled in 1908 but fortified again during World War II when it served as an air raid shelter.

== See also ==
- Citadel of Calais
