= Battle of Gravelines (1558) =

Battle of the Italian War near Calais, France

Coordinates: 50°59′14″N 2°07′42″E

- Part of the Italian War of 1551–1559
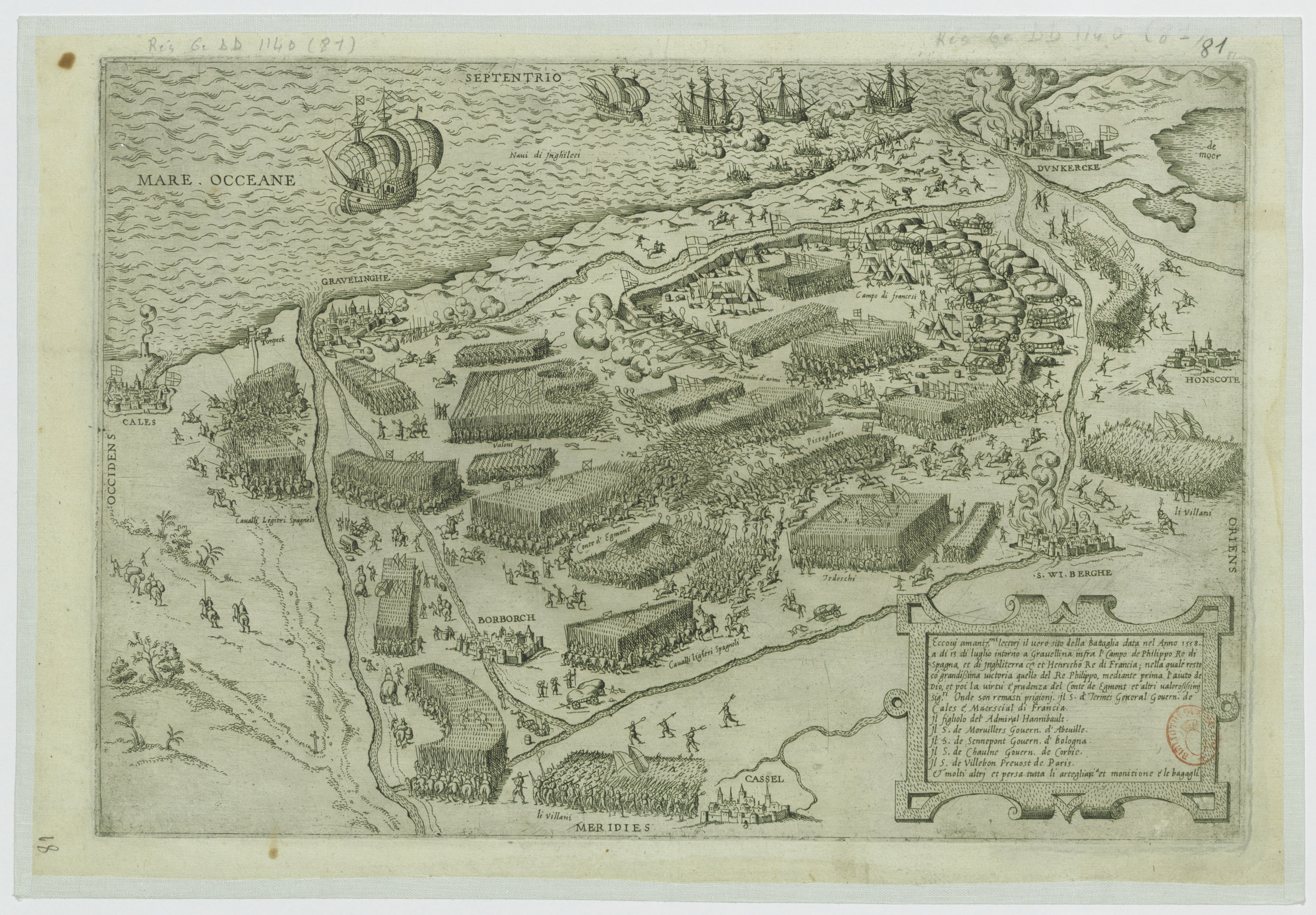
- The Battle of Gravelines
Date	13 July 1558
Location	Gravelines, France
Result	Anglo-Spanish victory

Belligerents
Kingdom of France	Kingdom of Spain; Kingdom of England

Commanders and leaders
(Kingdom of France) Paul de Thermes	(Spain) Lamoral, Count of Egmont (England) Edward Clinton, 1st Earl of Lincoln

Strength
12,000 infantry 2,001 cavalry	15,000 infantry 3,000 cavalry

Casualties and losses
12,500 dead, wounded, or captured	300 dead or wounded

The Battle of Gravelines was fought on 13 July 1558 at Gravelines, near Calais, France. It occurred during the twelve-year war between France and Spain (1547–1559).

The battle resulted in a victory by the Spanish forces, led by Lamoral, Count of Egmont, over the French, led by Marshal Paul de Thermes. The Spanish were supported by the English Navy, who opened fire on the French as they reached the sand dunes at Gravelines.

== Background ==
Following the dominant victory of the Spanish forces, led by Duke Emmanuel Philibert of Savoy, at the Battle of St. Quentin, Henry II of France prepared, what he hoped would be, a decisive counterstroke. He recruited a new army in Picardy, which he put in the hands of Louis Gonzaga, Duke of Nevers. He requested naval support from the Ottoman Sultan in the Mediterranean theatre and encouraged his Scottish allies to invade England from the north.

Francis, Duke of Guise, who had been recalled from Italy, had seized the port of Calais from the English Crown in January 1558.

This allowed the French to threaten the Habsburg Netherlands from two sides.

Guise then moved south to capture the city of Thionville in Philip II's duchy of Luxembourg in April, it fell on June 22nd.

Marshall de Thermes invaded the north of Flanders with another army consisting of 12,000 infantry, 2,000 cavalry and armed with a considerable amount of artillery. Crossing over the River Aa at its mouth near the town of Gravelines, de Thermes bypassed its considerable defensive works. He instead took both Dunkirk and Nieuwpoort via bombardment and looted both towns. De Thermes wished to remain and posture towards Brussels but was forced to withdraw upon receiving news of a greater Habsburg army arriving in the area under the command of Lamoral, Count of Egmont.

== Development of the battle ==
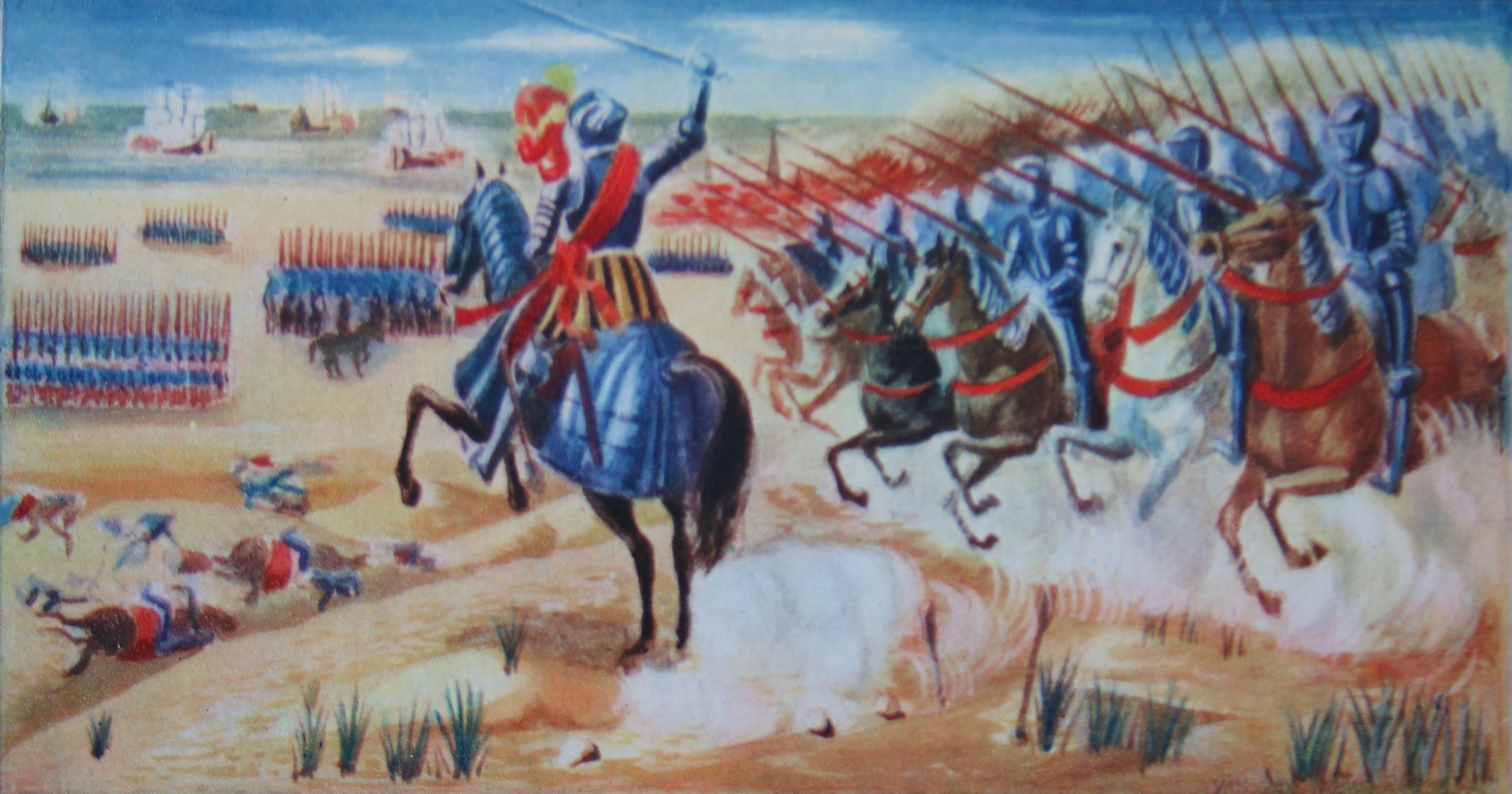
The Battle of Gravelines, 1558.

De Thermes attempted to withdraw west back to Calais, however, being weighed down by his plunder, Egmont was able to pass him and deny the crossings of the River Aa (the de facto border).

De Thermes position was suboptimal having the river Aa and Egmont in front of him, the sea on his right, marshes to his left and his own baggage, and medieval drainage canals, blocking his retreat and part of his right flank.

Egmont’s force also outnumbered de Thermes in cavalry.

De Thermes deployed in front of the Aa, placing his cavalry and artillery in advanced positions with his infantry forming the second line of thick pike square. Egmont deployed in a crescent with his cavalry on his wings and the infantry in the centre. The Battle was initially close fought, The French advantage in guns and the fact they were defending (and able to use some of their baggage as cover) led to the Spanish progress being slower and tougher than Egmont had hoped, still, his superior arqubusiers and cavalry advantage meant the Habsburg force were making hard won gains. The French position collapsed when an English naval squadron, commanded by Admiral Edward Clinton, 1st Earl of Lincoln, attracted by the sound of cannons, arrived. They sailed along the beach and into the mouth of the Aa and began bombarding the French right and rear. The French right was made up, in large part, by German mercenaries who broke. Pressing the advantage, Egmont personally led a cavalry charge into the French centre causing a full rout and granting the Anglo-Spanish force victory. De Thermes was captured during the rout alongside many other noblemen.

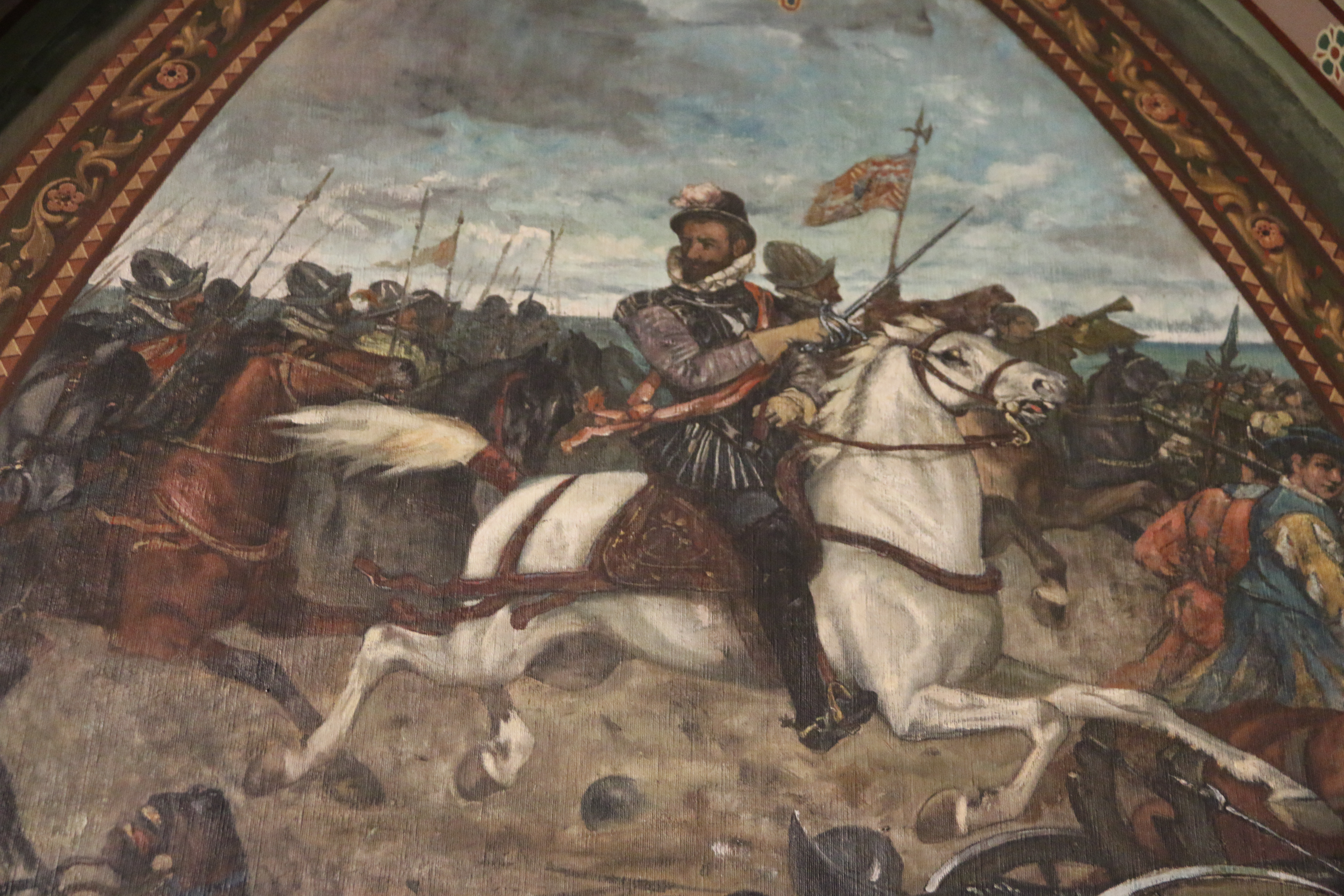
Count Egmont at the Battle of Gravelines

== Aftermath ==
This defeat, coupled with the loss at the Battle of St. Quentin (1557), forced Henry II of France to make peace with Philip II in the Treaty of Cateau-Cambrésis of 1559. It was because of this treaty that Philip II married Elisabeth of Valois, daughter of Henry, while Emmanuel Philibert, Duke of Savoy married Margaret of France, Duchess of Berry, sister of Henry and daughter of King Francis I of France.
