= Paul de Thermes =

French army officer (1482–1562)

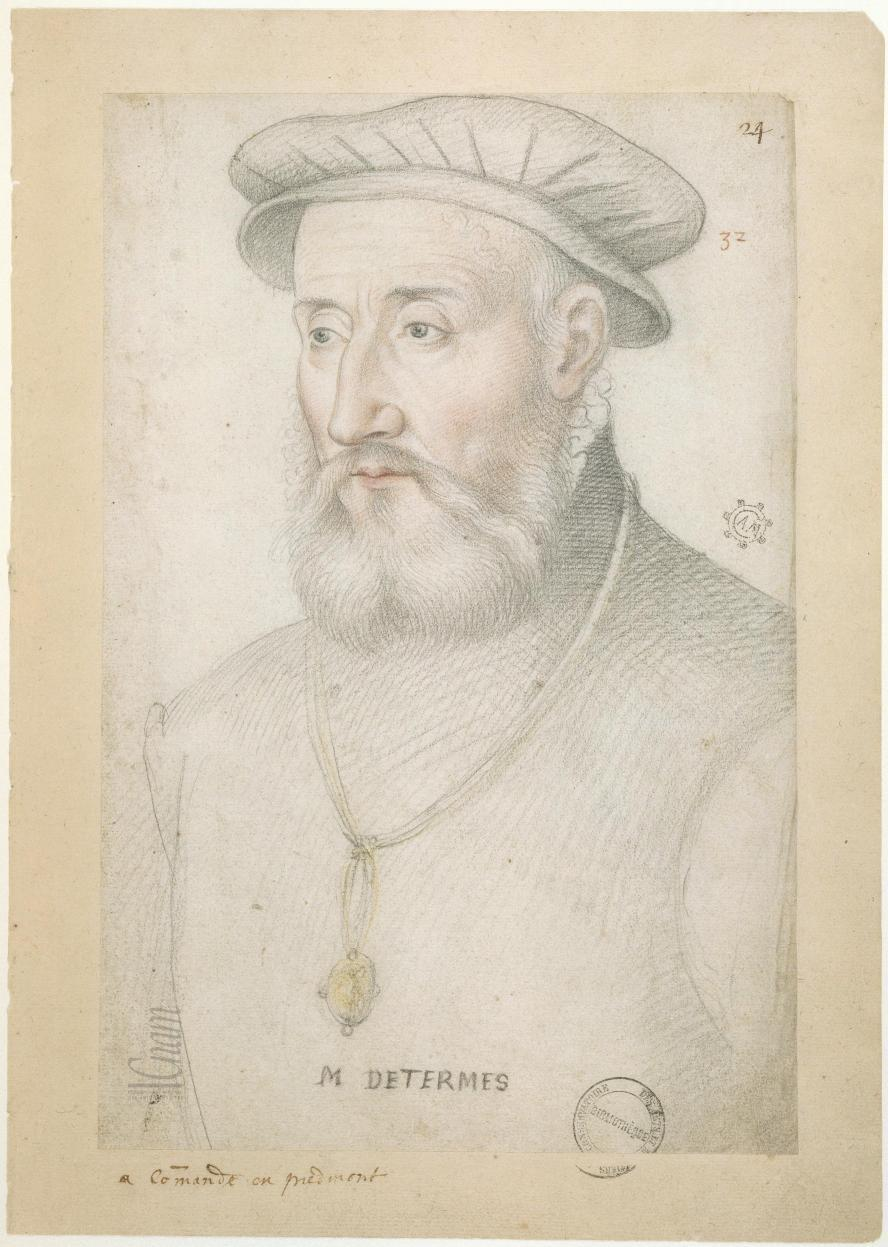
Maréchal de Thermes, after François Clouet, 1554.

Paul de La Barthe de Thermes or de Termes (1482–1562), also Paul de Terme or Maréchal de Thermes, was a French army Marshal ("Maréchal").

== Reign of Henri II ==
=== Rough Wooing ===
In June 1549, de Thermes was sent to Scotland to help in the war against England now called the Rough Wooing. He was instructed to continue the fortification of border strongholds, and came with massive reinforcements, munitions and money.

De Thermes began the construction of an artillery fort at Luffness near Aberlady to prevent English supplies reaching Haddington. The Scottish leader Regent Arran came to stay at Carberry Tower and Seton Palace to see the works commence. De Thermes was helped at the site by a Scottish pursuivant Alexander Ross. Gilbert Kennedy, 3rd Earl of Cassilis was lieutenant of the Scottish force there. There was a scare that English soldiers would over-run the building site on 23 June. Men were summoned from as far away as Perth and Strathearn. On 25 June the lairds of East and West Lothian were asked to provide workmen for the fort. On 4 July another proclamation responded to a scare that English forces had entered Scotland to supply Haddington and destroy the new fort. In July it was said that Arran had threatened the Laird of Beele near Dunbar to make him send his villagers to work on the fort. In August, four cannons were brought from Inveresk to Luffness.

An English officer, Thomas Holcroft, wrote to Lord Protector Somerset that they should burn the town of Peebles to welcome de Thermes. Holcroft reported that de Thermes had visited Stirling Castle to advise on its defences. He was camped at Longniddry and Aberlady, and had also visited Dunbar Castle. While he was at Dunbar, his escort skirmished with English cavalry, and the Laird of Scoughall was shot. De Thermes planned to have troops at Elveston and Ormiston near the English-garrisoned town of Haddington, at Dunbar, Luffness, and Musselburgh.

Subsequently, the English abandoned their occupation of Haddington and de Thermes and Regent Arran walked in. Mary of Guise was triumphant, writing that, "the English had left nothing behind but the plague." De Thermes led the successful assault on the English fort at Broughty Castle on Wednesday 6 February 1550. Following a recommendation by Mary of Guise on 30 September 1549, he was made a knight of the Order of St Michael for his service in Scotland.

=== Italian wars ===
He led the French effort in the Invasion of Corsica in 1553. The Ottoman fleet supported the French by ferrying the French troops under Marshal de Thermes from Sienese Maremma to Corsica. The Ottoman fleet of Dragut was at that time party to a Franco-Ottoman alliance.

Paul de Thermes, appointed Captain of Calais, lost the Battle of Gravelines in 1558.

== Reign of Charles IX ==
He died in Paris on 6 May 1562.
