= The Siege of Calais (painting) =

Painting by François-Édouard Picot

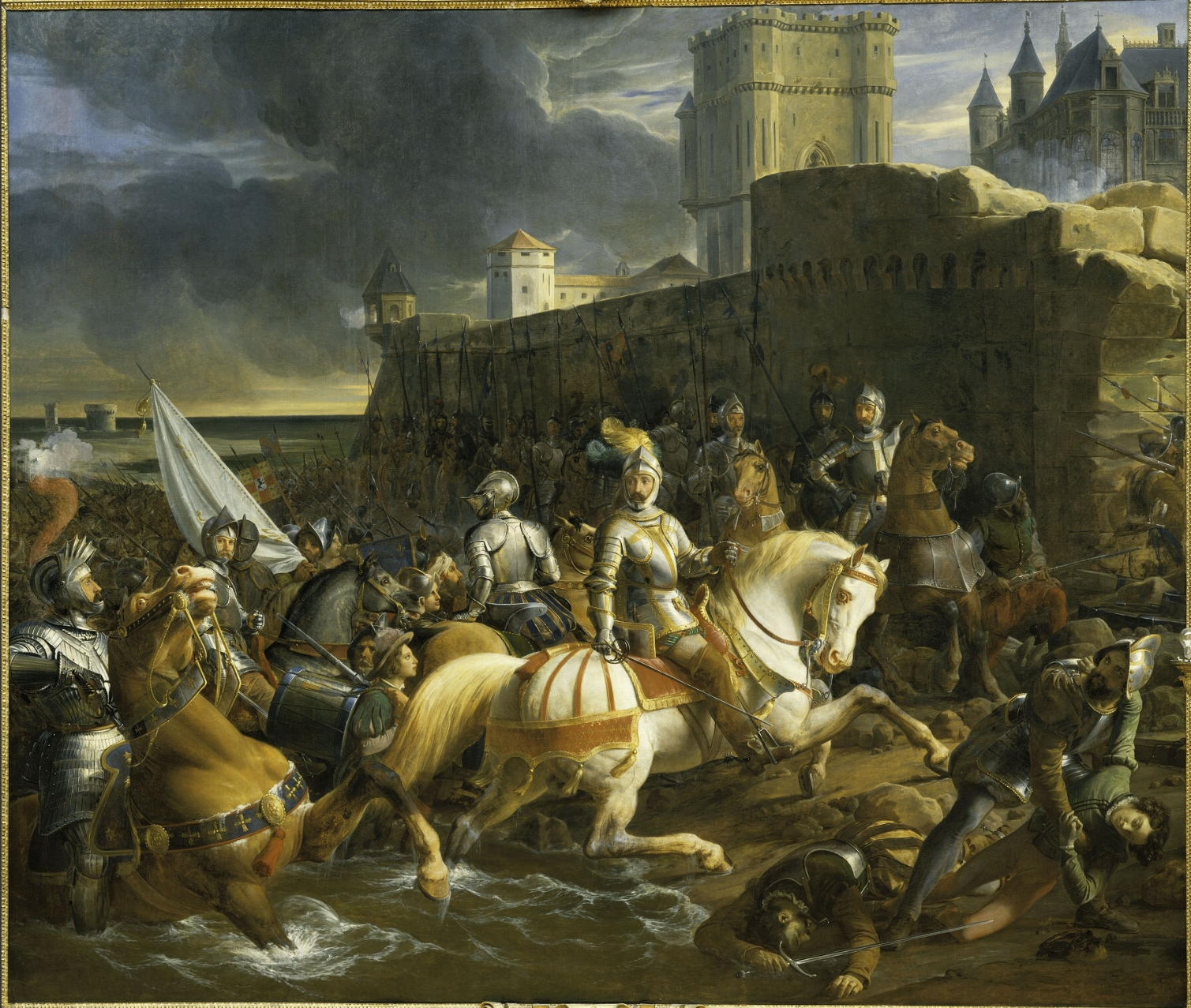
- Artist: François-Édouard Picot
- Year: 1838
- Type: Oil on canvas, history painting
- Dimensions: 465 cm × 543 cm (183 in × 214 in)
- Location: Palace of Versailles; Versailles

The Siege of Calais (French: La Prise de Calais) is an oil on canvas history painting by the French artist François-Édouard Picot, from 1838. It depicts the Siege of Calais in which French forces under the leadership of the Duke of Guise captured Calais from England. This brought an end to the Pale of Calais and led to the expulsion of the English garrison and inhabitants.

The picture was commissioned by Louis Philippe I for the new Musée de l'Histoire de France, part of a widespread policy of commemorating historic French victories during the July Monarchy. Originally the commission was for 9,000 francs, but this was later raised to 12,000. It was exhibited at the Salon of 1838 at the Louvre in Paris. Today it is in the Galerie des Batailles at the Palace of Versailles.

== Bibliography ==
- Haudiquet, Annette. Les bourgeois de Calais: fortunes d'un mythe. Musee des beaux-arts et de la dentelle, 1995.
- Hornstein, Katie. Picturing War in France, 1792–1856. Yale University Press, 2018.
