= Tess Berry-Hart =

English playwright and novelist

- Born: Warwickshire
- Occupation(s): Playwright and novelist

Tess Berry-Hart is a British playwright and novelist writing for adults, young adults and children. Novels and theatre plays deal with themes such as the European migrant crisis, LGBT rights, mental illness, genetic engineering, and the sex-positive movement. Berry-Hart has also written fiction and verbatim theatre pieces for stage to support human rights campaigns and to raise funds for the refugee crisis.

== Early life ==
Youngest child of painter and sculptor David Berry-Hart, Tess's paternal grandmother, Alice Berry-Hart, was a journalist and author of children's books and aunt Marian Lines was a playwright and children's author. Great-grandfather David Berry Hart was a noted gynaecologist and one of the first male practitioners in the UK.

Berry-Hart was born in Warwickshire, brought up in Oswestry on the Welsh Marches, and from age 11 to 18, won a music scholarship to study at Howell's School, Denbigh in North Wales. After school, Berry-Hart spent a year travelling and working in Turkey and Pakistan's North West Frontier as a teacher of English. Berry-Hart graduated magna cum laude with a first-class degree in law from King's College London.

== Career ==
Berry-Hart studied at the Royal Court Theatre Young Writers’ Programme in London under the tutorship of Hanif Kureishi and Simon Stephens. Berry-Hart was selected to be the Royal Court young writing representative at the Interplay Young European Playwrights Festival in Warsaw, Poland, with first play Legoland which dealt with post-traumatic stress and mental illness.

Berry-Hart's theatre work has been subsequently produced in London, New York, Los Angeles, Edinburgh, Cardiff and Ankara, and translated into German and Turkish. In 2019, Berry-Hart was shortlisted for the BBC Wales Writer in Residence Award in partnership with National Theatre Wales.

Since November 2021, Berry-Hart is part of the Writers' Group at the Sherman Theatre.

=== Theatre ===
In July 2016, Berry-Hart's play CARGO (inspired by experiences encountering child refugees in Calais) set in a cargo container following unaccompanied minors travelling to Europe, was produced by the Arcola Theatre in London. The Turkish translation premiere of Cargo ("Kargo") was produced and toured by the Turkish State Theatres in November 2018.

In 2018, the Welsh theatre The Other Room (in Cardiff) commissioned Berry-Hart to write a play for its 2019 Violence Series inspired by their experiences as a volunteer during the Syrian refugee crisis. "The Story" premiered in 2019 and subsequently toured Wales and London in Jan-Feb 2020. In October 2020, the Violence Series trilogy won an LPT 2020 theatre award for Best Transfer. "The Story" is published by Oberon Books.

In 2021, Berry-Hart became part of the Writers' Group at the Sherman Theatre Cardiff, developing a play called "Last Flight" loosely inspired by experiences volunteering during the Fall of Kabul (2021) and the 2021 Kabul Airlift evacuation of Afghanistan.

=== Verbatim theatre commissions ===
In 2012, Berry-Hart was commissioned to create a verbatim theatre piece, "Someone To Blame" based on the real-life case of Sam Hallam, a teenager wrongfully convicted of murder and imprisoned for 7 years. The play highlighted inaccuracies in the case against Hallam and was performed by the King's Head Theatre in the weeks before his second appeal. Hallam was released after a second three-hour hearing at the Court of Appeal. An updated gala performance of "Someone To Blame" was staged at the King's Head after his release.

In 2014, Berry-Hart was further commissioned by the King's Head Theatre in London to write a play about the lives of LGBT Russians following the passing of the anti-gay laws in Russia ahead of the Winter Olympics.

"Sochi 2014" was performed at the King's Head's new writing venue, The Hope Theatre London, in 2014, with other benefit performances occurring in New York (performed by Uzo Aduba, Masha Gessen and Catherine Curtin) as well as Los Angeles that same year. An updated version of Sochi 2014 was produced and won an NSDF commendation award at the Edinburgh Festival, during August 2014.

In 2019, Berry-Hart was commissioned to curate the testimonies of women workers in the developing world to produce a short play for International Women's Day (#March4Women Rally) hosted by CARE International at Central Hall Westminster. The play was performed live by Helena Bonham Carter, Meera Syal, Nicola Thorp, Naana Agyei-Ampadu, and Nina Sosanya, directed by Berry-Hart.

The next year, for IWD 2020, Berry-Hart produced and directed another verbatim play concerning the testimonies of refugees of climate change which was produced at The Royal Festival Hall and performed by Natalie Dormer, Nicola Coughlan, Sanjeev Bhaskar and Himesh Patel.

=== Young adult novels ===
In 2007, Berry-Hart's first novel, Escape from Genopolis, was published by Scholastic Corporation. This was followed by the sequel, Fearless, in 2009.

=== Refugee crisis ===
In September 2015, during the European migrant crisis, Berry-Hart visited the Calais Jungle refugee camp in France and upon returning became aid and advocacy co-ordinator for Calais Action, part of the UK Grassroots Aid movement, sending aid to Calais. Athens, and the islands of Samos, Chios, and Lesvos.

Berry-Hart has spoken at the United Nations High Commissioner for Refugees in Geneva and ALNAP in Stockholm from a volunteer perspective, and appeared as commentator on refugee issues on the BBC, ITV, and various documentaries and campaigns for the rights of refugees and the need for safe and legal routes to asylum.

In 2016, Berry-Hart produced a gala weekend of new writing to raise funds for the Syrian refugee crisis at the Southwark Playhouse featuring short pieces of refugee-related writing by Timberlake Wertenbaker, Anders Lustgarten, Barney Norris, Mediah Ahmed, as well as a collection of Syrian refugee poetry performed by Denise Gough and Russell Tovey. The event was compered by comedians Robin Ince and Adam Riches.

Berry-Hart is also a founding member of the Citizens of the World Choir for refugees, migrants and friends.

In 2021, Berry-Hart helped support and evacuate LGBTQ Afghans after the Taliban takeover of Afghanistan, as a volunteer with the Turkey-based NGO Aman Project which supports LGBTQ refugees.
