= Calais Jungle =

Evicted migrant camp in France

Calais Jungle Jungle de Calais
- Migrant camp
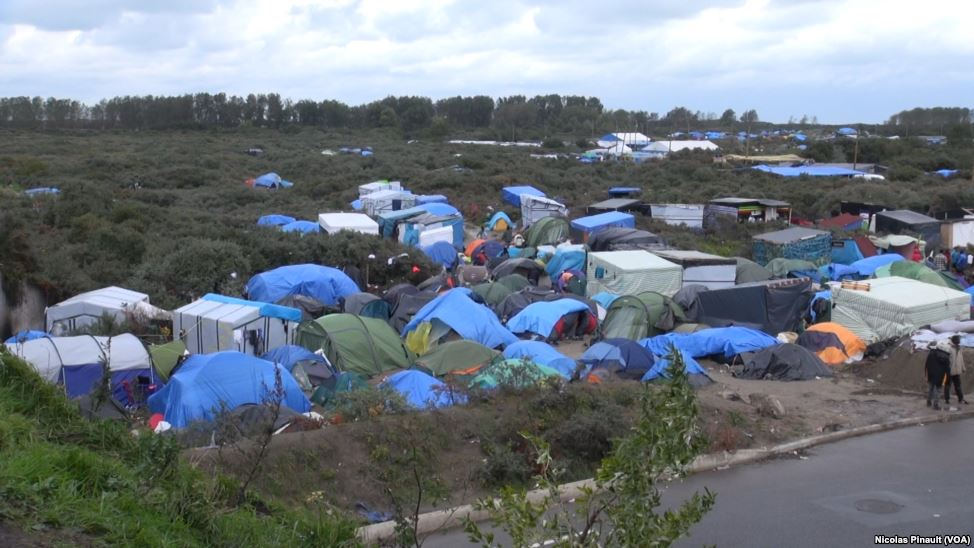
- The camp in October 2015

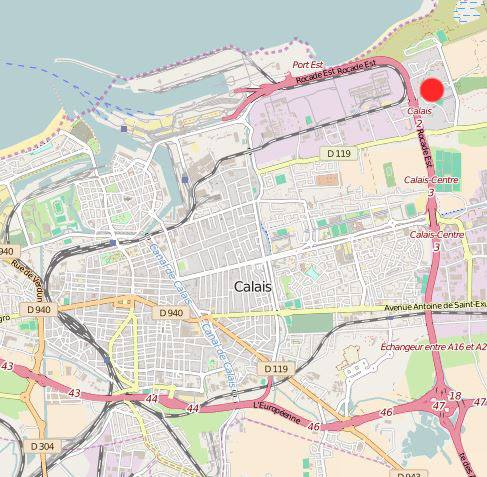
- Location in the city of Calais
- Coordinates: 50°58′7″N 1°54′21″E
- Country: France
- Region: Hauts-de-France

Population (October 2016 (before closure))
  - Total: 8,143
- Census by Help Refugees
- Time zone: CET (UTC+01)

The Calais Jungle (known officially as Camp de la Lande) was a refugee and immigrant encampment in the vicinity of Calais, France, that existed from January 2015 to October 2016. There had been other camps known as "jungles" in previous years, but this particular shanty town drew global media attention during the peak of the European migrant crisis in 2015, when its population grew rapidly. Migrants stayed at the camp while they attempted to enter the United Kingdom, or while they waited for their French asylum claims to be processed.

The camp was located on a former landfill site to the east of Calais. By July 2015, it had 3,000 inhabitants and continued to grow. Although estimates of the number of migrants differed, a Help Refugees (now Choose Love) census gave a figure of 8,143 people just before the camp's demolition in October 2016. As well as residences, the Jungle contained shops, restaurants, hairdressers, schools, places of worship and a boxing club.

The Government of France initially tolerated the camp, later opting to rehouse 1,500 migrants in shipping containers to be used as shelters on the north-eastern side of the site. In February 2016, they evicted the southern sector of the Jungle and there were several arrests. The Jungle received local support and international solidarity from activists, artists, intellectuals and grassroots aid organisations. The camp was completely cleared and demolished in October 2016. According to Government plans, 6,400 migrants would be moved to 280 temporary reception centres around France. There were concerns over the fate of 200 unaccompanied children and Human Rights Watch published a report in 2017 stating that up to 1,000 migrants were still living in the Calais region. While there is no longer a camp like the Jungle in Calais, a sizeable number of migrants are still present.

== Context ==
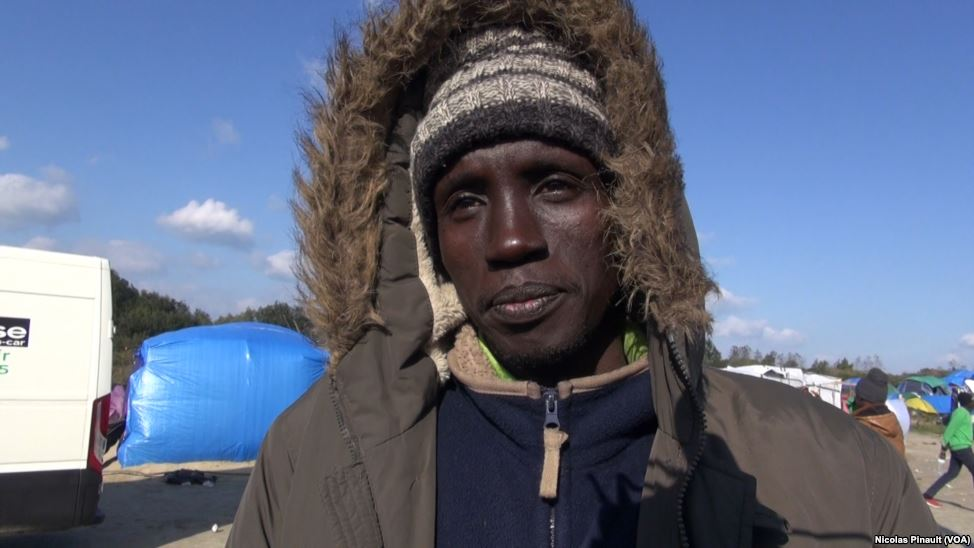
Badeldin Shogar, a Sudanese migrant, at the Jungle in October 2015

Migrants based in Calais were attempting to enter the United Kingdom via the Port of Calais or the Channel Tunnel by stowing away on lorries, ferries, cars, or trains. Some migrants were attempting to return to the United Kingdom having once lived there, whilst others were attempting to enter the British labour market to find under-the-table work, which is more difficult in France. Some migrants lived in the camp while seeking asylum in France, a choice they made because the French system did not provide for them while their claim was being processed, leaving them homeless for the duration. One migrant from Egypt, a politics graduate, told The Guardian that he had "paid $3,000 (£2,000) to leave Egypt, risked my life on a boat to Italy spending days at sea" and that in one month he had tried 20 times to reach England; another, an Eritrean woman with a one-year-old child, had paid €2,500 (£1,825) – and her husband the same – to sail to Italy, but her husband had drowned during the journey. Migrants risk their lives when they try to climb aboard or travel on lorries, occasionally falling off and breaking bones; some fatalities en route are also recorded. In September 2016, workers began building a barrier, dubbed "The Great Wall Of Calais", to block refugees from accessing a highway where they could stow away on vehicles bound for Britain.

Migrants have gathered around Calais since at least the 1990s. A refugee centre opened in 1999 and had been administered by the French Red Cross at Sangatte, but rapidly became overcrowded. After the Sangatte facility was closed in November 2002 by Nicolas Sarkozy (then the French Minister of the Interior) under pressure from the UK government, a "jungle" camp was established in the woods around the Port of Calais, along with various other camps that sprung up around the city before being torn down by the authorities. The large camp lasted until April 2009, when the French authorities launched a raid, arresting 190 people and using bulldozers to destroy tents. By July 2009, the camp had been re-established, and the BBC estimated it held around 800 inhabitants. French authorities closed down the camp in a September 2009 dawn raid and detained 276 people. Conditions in these camps were poor, typically without proper sanitary or washing facilities and accommodation consisting of tents and improvised shelters. Food was supplied by charity kitchens. The French authorities faced a dilemma of addressing humanitarian needs without attracting additional migrants. The notion of humanitarian aid provision being a pull factor to the area has been contested by academics.

Smaller camps continued to be set up and evicted over the following years, and local volunteers provided aid to migrants. After a visit to the city by French interior minister Bernard Cazeneuve in September 2014, Cazeneuve and the mayor of Calais Natacha Bouchart agreed on opening a day centre in Calais for migrants and a night shelter specifically for women and children. It was this decision that led to the opening of the Jules Ferry Centre in January of the following year, around which the camp expanded. In December 2014, the United Nations High Commissioner for Refugees said the conditions in Calais were "totally unacceptable". In partnership with local associations, the UNHCR also reported that 15 people, including young women and teenagers, had died at the border during 2014.

In January 2015, the government set up an official day centre, initially consisting of three military tents in the car park of a former children's holiday camp, the Jules Ferry Centre. Located on the eastern outskirts of the city, this was the first permanent site for migrants in the area since the camp at Sangatte. It was run by La Vie Active and was set up as a place from which food could be distributed, with overnight accommodation for up to 500 women and children added a few months later. Migrants were pushed towards this site through the dismantling of other encampments around the city and the area around the Jules Ferry Centre became a "tolerated zone" where migrants camped. It is this site that developed into the Calais Jungle.

== Location and name ==
The Calais Jungle was located on a former landfill site in a Seveso zone. The land had been polluted by industrial waste and had been designated a Natura 2000 protected nature habitat. From 2000 onwards, the name "jungle" has been used by migrants to describe many encampments and shanty towns around Calais. The use of the word to describe encampments is thought to derive from the Pashto word "dzjangal" which means a forest or wood. The moniker "Calais Jungle" is now most associated with this particular camp that existed from January 2015 to October 2016, located on the eastern edge of Calais, under 500 metres (1,600 ft) away from the Port of Calais and next to the N216 bypass, used by vehicles approaching or leaving the ferry terminal. It was tolerated by the French authorities who officially referred to it as the Camp de la Lande ("Lande" meaning "heath" or "moor", referring to the geography and location of the site, a sandy area of flats and dunes outside the perimeter of the city).

== Statistics ==
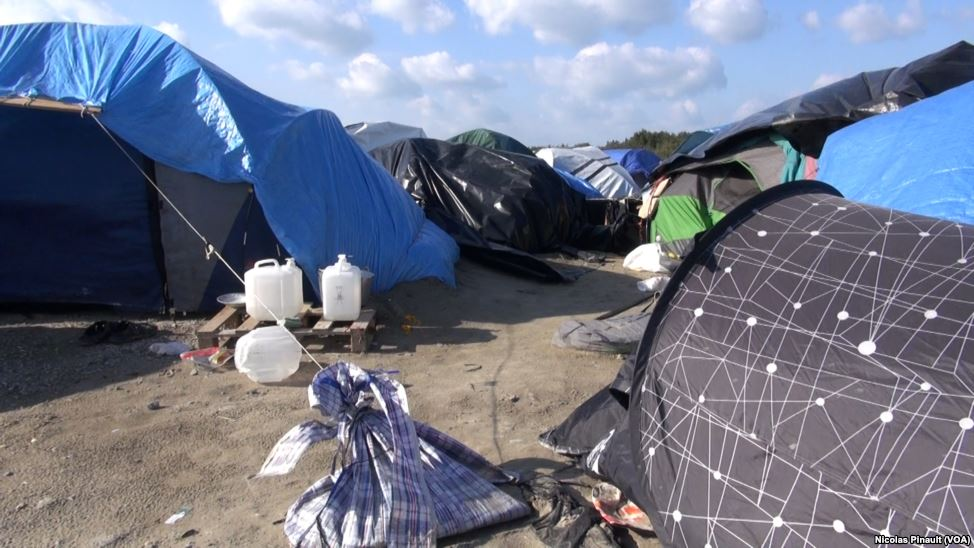
Tents at the jungle in October 2015

By September 2014, The Guardian estimated that there were 1,300 migrants in Calais, mostly from Eritrea, Somalia and Syria. In 2015, during the peak of the European migrant crisis, the numbers began to grow. Migrants arrived from Afghanistan, Darfur, Iraq and other conflict zones. By July 2015, The Telegraph reported that the "new jungle" had 3,000 inhabitants.

Médecins du Monde stated in 2015 that 62% of the migrants in Calais were young men with an average age of 33, with an increase in the number unaccompanied children (517 in 2014, eight times more than in 2011). Many migrants later moved to smaller camps near Calais and Dunkirk. As of November 2015, there were an estimated 6,000 migrants living in Calais, policed by over 1,000 officers. That winter, the number of arrivals decreased while a number of migrants left the camp, such as 3,569 who were "welcomed to France". At the end of February 2016, the BBC noted that there were differing figures for the population: "Calais officials say it houses 3,700, while Help Refugees puts it at 5,497". Aid organisations put discrepancies between their and the authorities' figures down to different counting methods and a reluctance from migrants to speak to border police.

Refugee Rights Data Project (RRDP, later known as Refugee Rights Europe) released a report in April 2016 called The Long Wait: Filling the data gaps relating to refugees and displaced people in the Calais camp. It stated that 75.9% of the 870 refugees surveyed said they had experienced police violence, a category including physical and sexual violence, verbal abuse and misuse of tear gas. A similar figure (76.7%) reported health issues resulting from living in the Jungle. According to The Long Wait, at the time of the report 71.6% of the approximately 5,500 residents had been in the camp for three to six months. About 78 people had been there for more than a year and around 205 women lived in the camp at this time (3.2% of the population).

A large fight between 200 and 300 migrants from Afghanistan and Sudan broke out at the camp in late May 2016, resulting in 40 injuries (33 migrants, 5 aid workers and 2 police officers), of which 3 were serious (including a stabbing). Two hundred police officers, seventy firefighters and eleven ambulances responded to the scene; French authorities opened an investigation. At the time, Deutsche Welle estimated that 4,000 to 5,000 people lived in the camp. During the summer, the population of the camp surpassed the highest number of the previous year. According to a July 2016 census by Help Refugees, the camp was populated by 7,307 migrants, of which 761 were minors with the population growing by 50 people a day on average. By September, the state estimated the population at 6,901, while local non-governmental organisations (NGOs) put it at 9,000 – a figure accepted by Mayor Bouchart. It was estimated that the population reached 10,000 before the camp's demolition. Help Refugees' final count put the population of the camp at 8,143 in October 2016. More than 1,000 police were deployed during the final eviction.

In July 2017, Human Rights Watch (HRW) presented its findings on police violence in Calais based on interviews conducted with more than 60 temporary residents, half of whom were unaccompanied minors. In the international NGO's report, it revealed that there was an unregulated use of pepper spray by Calais police throughout the Jungle, resulting not only in the physical and psychological trauma of the refugees, but also the spoilage of their food and water, an act which the interviewed refugees alleged as intentional. In a broader report published earlier in the month, "Nobody Deserves to Live This Way!", the Human Trafficking Foundation (HTF) noted that the hostilities of the French government and police towards Calais refugees were meant to deter them from initiating the process to seek asylum in the U.K., particularly impacting unaccompanied minors with decreased access to information about their rights.

UNITED for Intercultural Action lists more than 40 migrant deaths in and around Calais during the time of the Jungle. Causes of death include suffocation in the back of a lorry, being hit by a vehicle (including train), beaten to death by people smugglers, killed during a fight between migrants, drowning, suspected heart attack, and suspected murder by right-wing extremists.

== Facilities and infrastructure ==
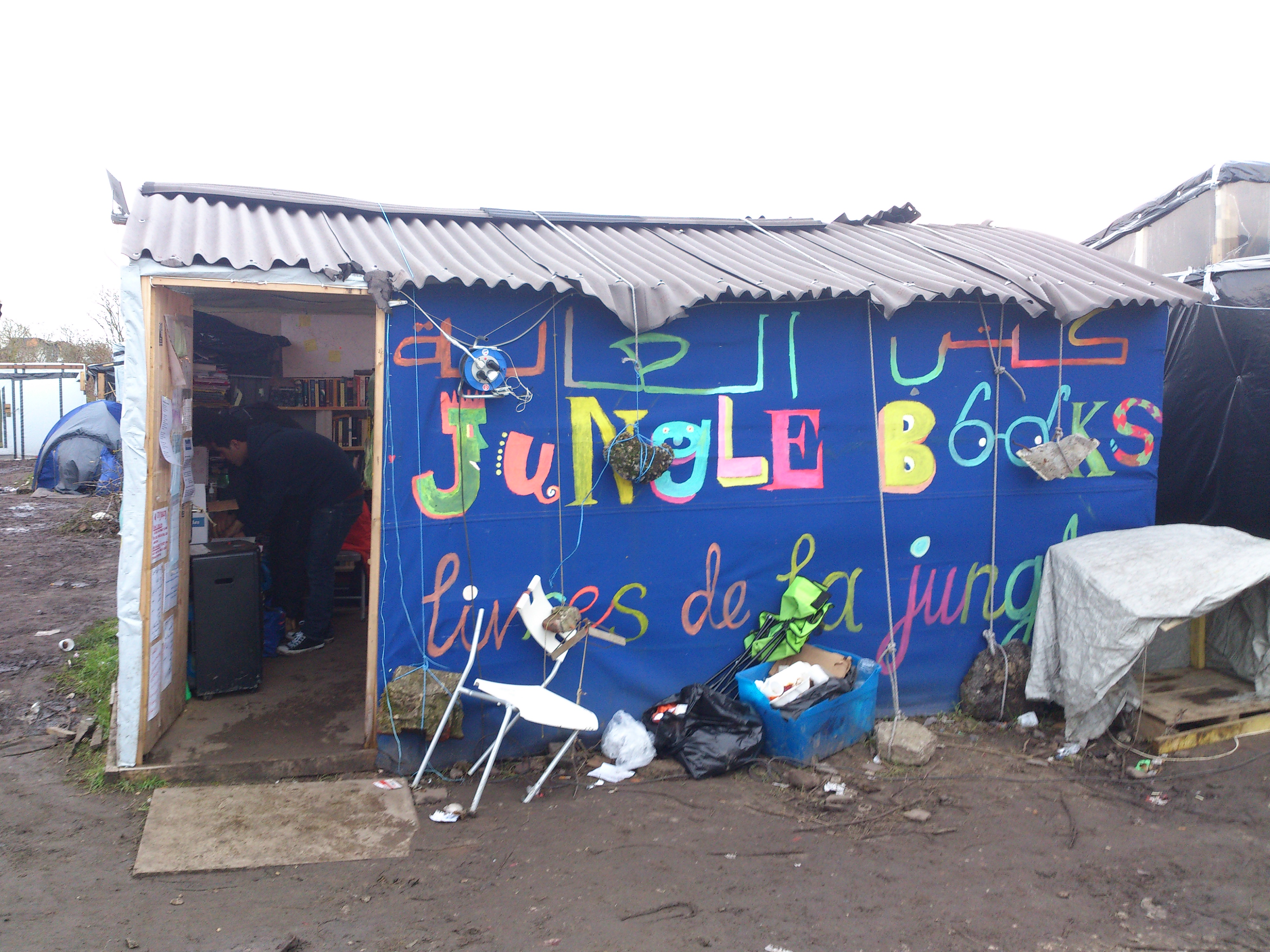
A makeshift library in the camp, January 2016

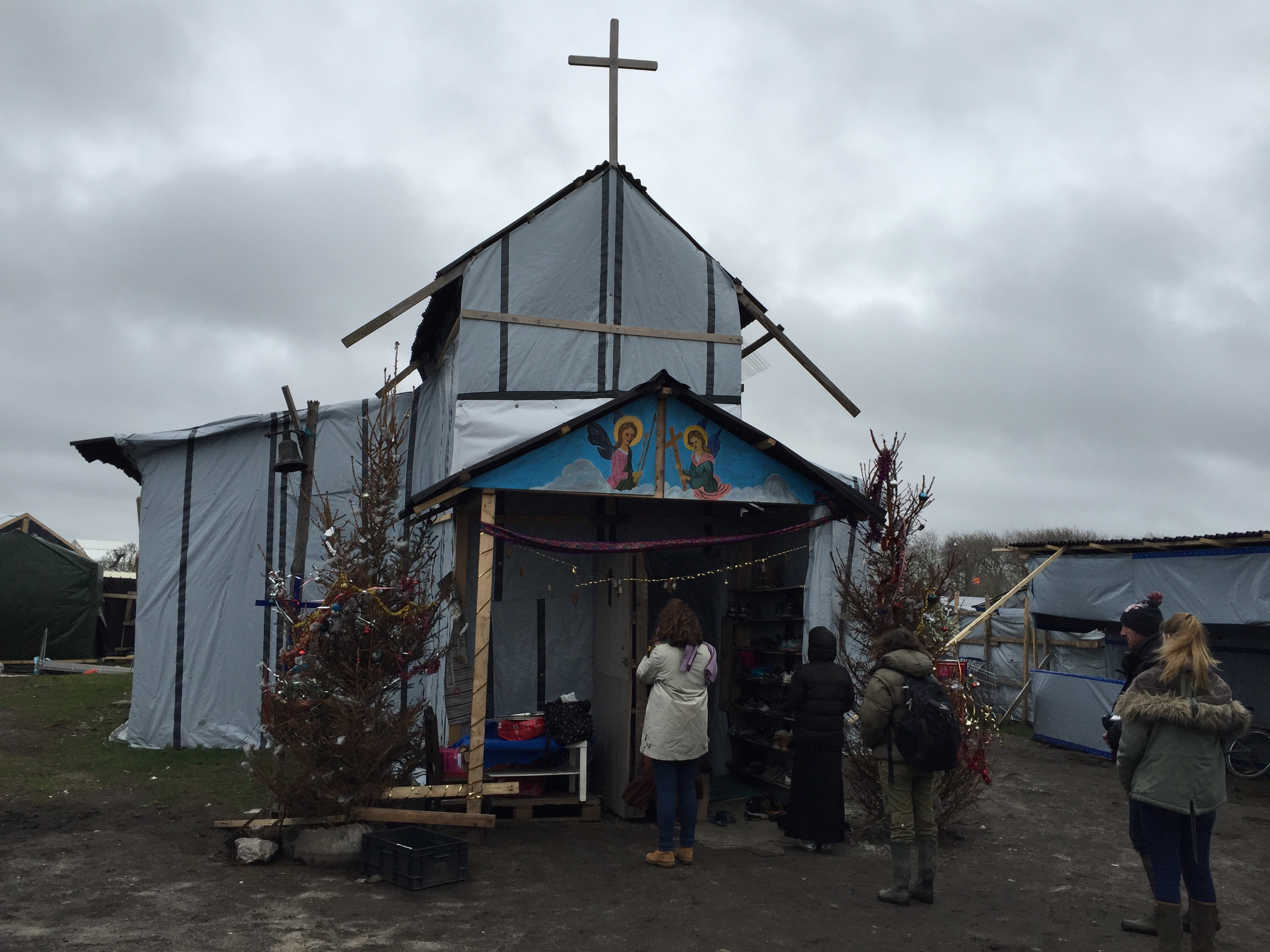
The entrance to St Michael's Church in 2016

In 2015, a Médecins Sans Frontières (MSF) doctor who had worked in the camp for ten days claimed that the conditions were worse than anything she had seen in African slums. Access to water taps and showers was inadequate. Médecins du Monde stated in July 2015 that there was "insufficient drinking water (30 taps), practically no toilets (20 for 3,000 people), insufficient food, inadequate health care." As a result of these conditions, residents faced numerous health challenges. For example, Médecins du Monde estimated that up to 40% of people they treated in the camp had scabies, a contagious parasitic condition common in refugee camps and other crowded institutions worldwide. Roads could be mapped in the camp and some lighting was installed through its centre; although most of the camp was unlit, residents reported feeling vulnerable at night.

Residents built dwellings and set up amenities, including shops, restaurants, hair dressers and places of worship. Food critic A. A. Gill ate at a nameless restaurant run by Mohammed Ali from Peshawar, rating both food and atmosphere four out of five, commenting that the main course was "a properly, cleverly crafted and wholly unexpected dish, made with finesse". After an appeal by NGOs to the court in Lille that the amenities were vital for feeding residents, a judge blocked authorities from attempting to raze restaurants and shops in August 2016, ruling there was no legal basis for the demolitions.

St. Michael's Church (also known as the Ethiopian Church) was first erected in November 2014. It had to be moved in April 2015 and subsequently burnt down after a candle was dropped; it was reconstructed out of waste materials and completed in July 2015. The church was featured on the BBC Television's Songs of Praise in August 2015. This was a controversial action since the BBC was accused by the Daily Express and the Sun of wasting its licence payers' fees and of taking a political stance. Senior Church of England figures such as the Bishop of Leeds, the Dean of Durham and the Archbishop of Canterbury said they fully supported the program. In 2016, a different church and a mosque were demolished by the authorities.

A number of NGOs worked to provide refugee relief, including the French associations L'Aubergue des Migrants, Salam, Secours Catholique, and Utopia 56. A number of foreign NGOs were also present, including Help Refugees (working in partnership with L'Auberge des Migrants), Refugee Community Kitchen, Calais Kitchens, Belgium Kitchen, Calais Action, Care4Calais, and Refugee Info Bus. Between them they provided food, material aid, legal information, sanitation and shelter. Educational services were provided by Jungle Books, the Ecole Laïque chemins des dunes and by Edlumino. Specialist services for women and children were run by the Unofficial Women's and Children's Centre and the Refugee Youth Service. NGOs also provided recreation: such as a boxing club and the Good Chance Theatre, which ran from a dome doubling as a community space for other activities.

=== Containers ===
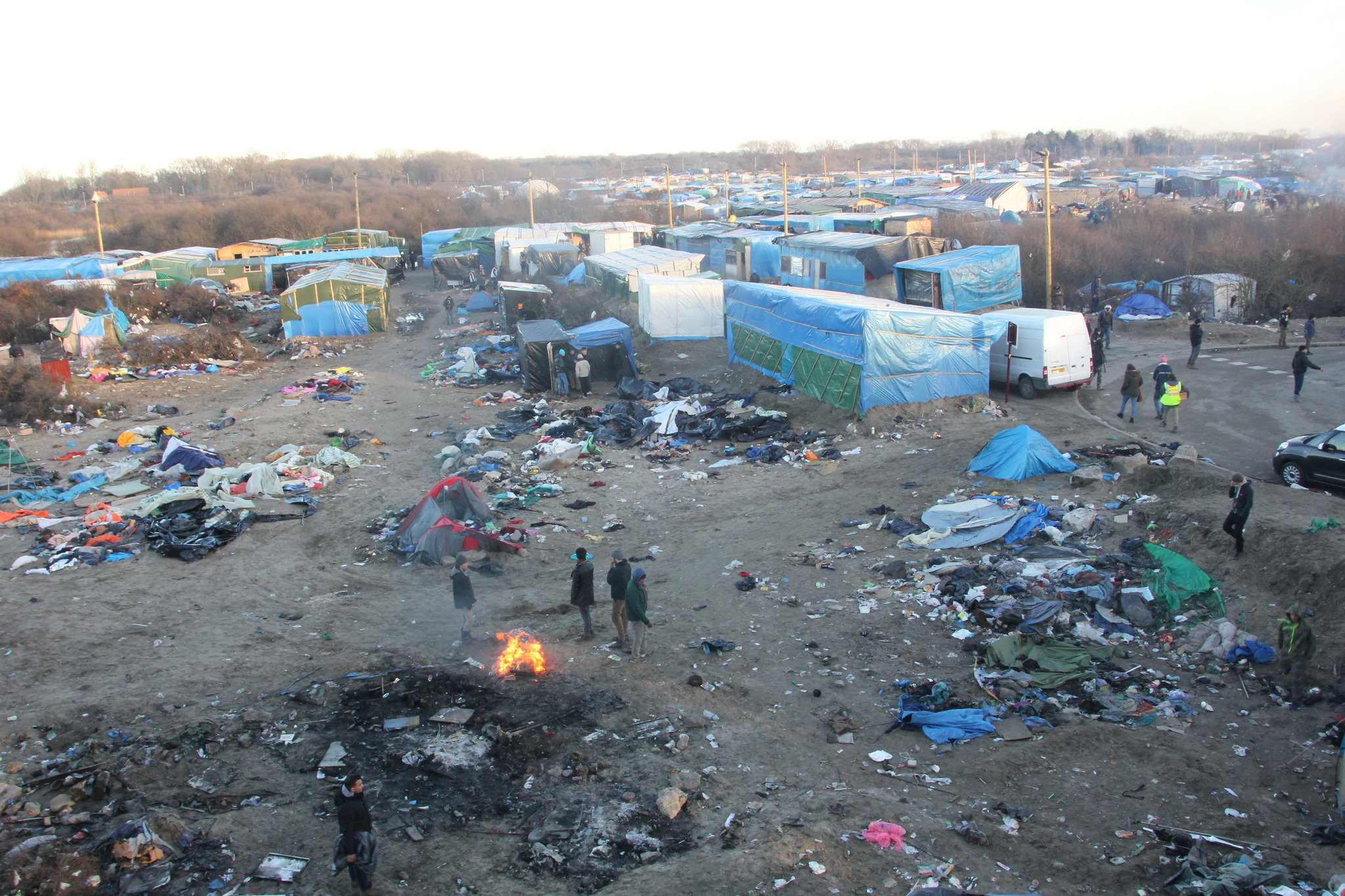
The camp in January 2016

In January 2016, French authorities opened a new area in the northeastern part of the jungle. They had earlier cleared tents and shacks from this area and erected 125 metal shipping containers in their place, converting them into housing units for up to 1,500 migrants. Shipping containers, rather than more permanent structures, were chosen because the sand dunes are unfit for permanent foundations. The containers were white and furnished with bunk beds, windows, and heaters, but had no running water or sanitary facilities (toilets and showers were made available at an existing nearby facility). At the time, Reuters described the entire jungle as "squalid" and "unsanitary" and estimated its total population to be 4,000.

Many migrants subsequently moved into the container housing, but some resisted the French government's ultimatum to leave their makeshift housing and live in the container area, citing its spartan setup, lack of communal areas, and their fears that once in the new housing area, they would be blocked from going to Britain. This concern arose because the containers were enclosed by a metal fence and it was necessary to give a fingerprint to gain access. Under the Dublin Regulation an asylum seeker must seek asylum in the EU Member State where they first gave their fingerprints and they may not seek asylum elsewhere, thus some migrants were concerned that if their fingerprints were taken in France they would then not be able to claim asylum in the UK. The authorities stated the fingerprints were taken for security reasons.

== Reactions ==
=== Solidarity ===
Local citizens, No Borders activists and thousands of volunteers making up local and foreign grassroots organisations supported migrants in the camp, as did a number of academics, artists and celebrities. Libération published an open letter in support of the migrants on 20 October 2015, signed by 800 film-makers and intellectuals. Jaz O'Hara visited with her boyfriend during summer 2015 and decided to collect donations after writing a Facebook post which was shared 60,000 times in a few days. They set up a group called CalAid and collected clothing donations in London. They received hundreds of tents from Reading and Leeds Festivals and took the donations to Calais in a fleet of 40 vans. TV presenter Dawn O'Porter and Radio X presenter Lliana Bird, along with mutual friend Josie Naughton, used their social media capital to organise a donation and fund-raising Twitter campaign in August 2015, using the hashtag #HelpCalais. For the first five weeks, about 7,000 items were purchased a day from the group's Amazon wish list and within weeks they had raised £50,000. The scale of the response drew the women into further logistical and distribution organisation, out of which the charity Help Refugees was formed.

Banksy created a mural called The Son of a Migrant from Syria in the camp in December 2015, featuring Steve Jobs as a migrant. Prior to the eviction of the southern section of the camp, playwright Tom Stoppard and actors Jude Law, Tom Odell and Toby Jones performed in the camp at the end of February 2016 to draw attention to the eviction. The performance was organised by Letters Live in the Good Change theatre, a space set up by British volunteers the previous year and included readings by camp residents. Popstar Lily Allen visited in summer 2016 at the instigation of a friend who runs a migrant charity. She apologised to a 13-year-old child migrant, Shamsher, on behalf of the UK; Shamsher later entered the UK in October 2016.

=== Opposition ===
Assaults on migrants near the Jungle were reported on several occasions. Seven attackers belonging to anti-migrant movements and armed with iron bars and electric batons were arrested during the night of 10 February 2016 at Loon-Plage. On 22 February 2016, four other people were arrested on suspicion of assaults against migrants. On 9 March 2016, five people were arrested, three of whom had already been arrested at Loon-Plage on 10 February. The five men were allegedly involved in at least seven attacks on migrants.

On 5 September 2016, truck drivers, local farmers, and trade unionists, protesting against what they saw as "wilful destruction" by migrants residing in the camp, slowed traffic entering the port of Calais and demanded the closure of the Jungle. The protesters blockaded the A16 with lorries and agricultural vehicles.

Camp residents experienced hostility from the police. While the camp was initially tolerated by the authorities, opposition grew and culminated in the final eviction of the camp in October 2016.

== 2016 evictions ==
=== Eviction of the southern sector ===
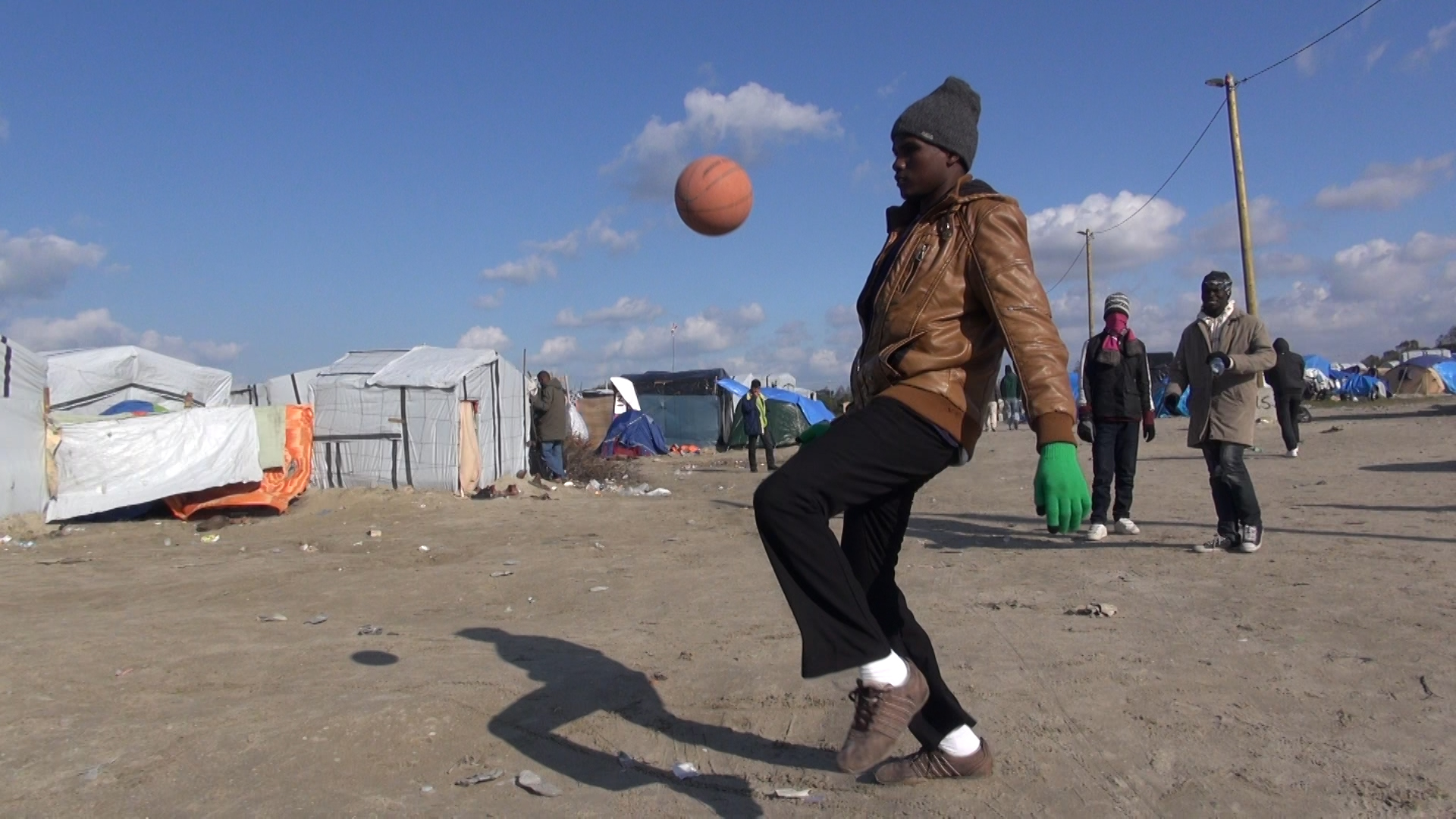
A young migrant or refugee playing with a ball at the camp in October 2015

On 25 February 2016, the French government received approval from a court in Lille to demolish the southern part of the camp. The section to be demolished was an area of 7.5 hectares (19 acres). There had been a delay in the verdict because charities had petitioned the court to stop the demolition. Local authorities estimated the population of the whole camp to be 3,700, with between 800 and 1,000 affected by the eviction. Aid groups put the number higher according to a census they had conducted, suggesting there were "at least 3,450 people in the southern part alone, including 300 unaccompanied children".

During the night of 29 February, workers under heavy police guard began to demolish shacks in the encampment. There was some resistance during the eviction and police clashed with migrants and No Border activists who threw stones. About 12 structures were set on fire, some by heat from tear gas canisters fired by the police, others by residents of the structures being demolished. Protests continued into the evening, when migrants blocked the nearby road. Three No Border activists and another person were arrested.

According to aid associations, 80% of people whose shelters were demolished in the eviction relocated to the remaining part of the camp, resulting in overcrowding and caused MSF to become increasingly concerned about health conditions within the camp. Aid associations said the overcrowding also resulted in inter-community tensions.

=== Final eviction and demolition ===
In September 2016, the Minister of the Interior Bernard Cazeneuve announced that the northern zone of the Calais Jungle would be dismantled and that the entirety of the Jungle would be closed until the end of the year. Refugees were informed of the government's decision through the distribution of thousands of leaflets throughout the Jungle. On Monday, 24 October 2016, the Government of France began the final major eviction at dawn. It was planned that 6,400 migrants would be moved from the Jungle to 280 temporary reception centres around France, in 170 buses. Although the days leading up to the closure of the northern zone were marked by violent clashes between the police and refugees, news outlets asserted that the day of the eviction was much calmer than during the southern zone's closure earlier in the spring.

The prefect of Pas-de-Calais, Fabienne Buccio, announced on Wednesday, 26 October, that the camp had been cleared, but news reporters stated there were still adults in the camp and unaccompanied children were waiting to be processed, the latter of whose information was forwarded to the British government in order to connect them to relatives in the U.K. Although Parisian authorities initially threatened uncooperative migrants with incarceration in administrative detention centres, upon a reevaluation of capacity, migrants were permitted to leave by themselves from Calais either by foot or by train. Whilst some migrants relocated to a camp in Grande-Synthe, many fled to informal settlements in rural areas across northern France.

On Thursday, 27 October, the UK and French governments were condemned by aid workers from groups such as Help Refugees and Save the Children for not respecting the human rights of children. The 200 unaccompanied children, aged 14 to 17, had been lured out of the camp by promises of transport to an asylum centre but were then abandoned. After Baroness Sheehan had intervened, a number of the children ended up being told by police to return to a derelict and unheated makeshift school building in the camp. Liberal Democrat peer Sheehan had travelled to the camp to witness the eviction. The final stages of the eviction took place on Wednesday, 2 November. An estimated 1,500 people including children had been sleeping for a week in the shipping containers. Buses took the migrants to asylum centres at undisclosed locations across the country. Aid groups later reported that many former jungle residents had moved to the streets of Paris.

== Aftermath ==
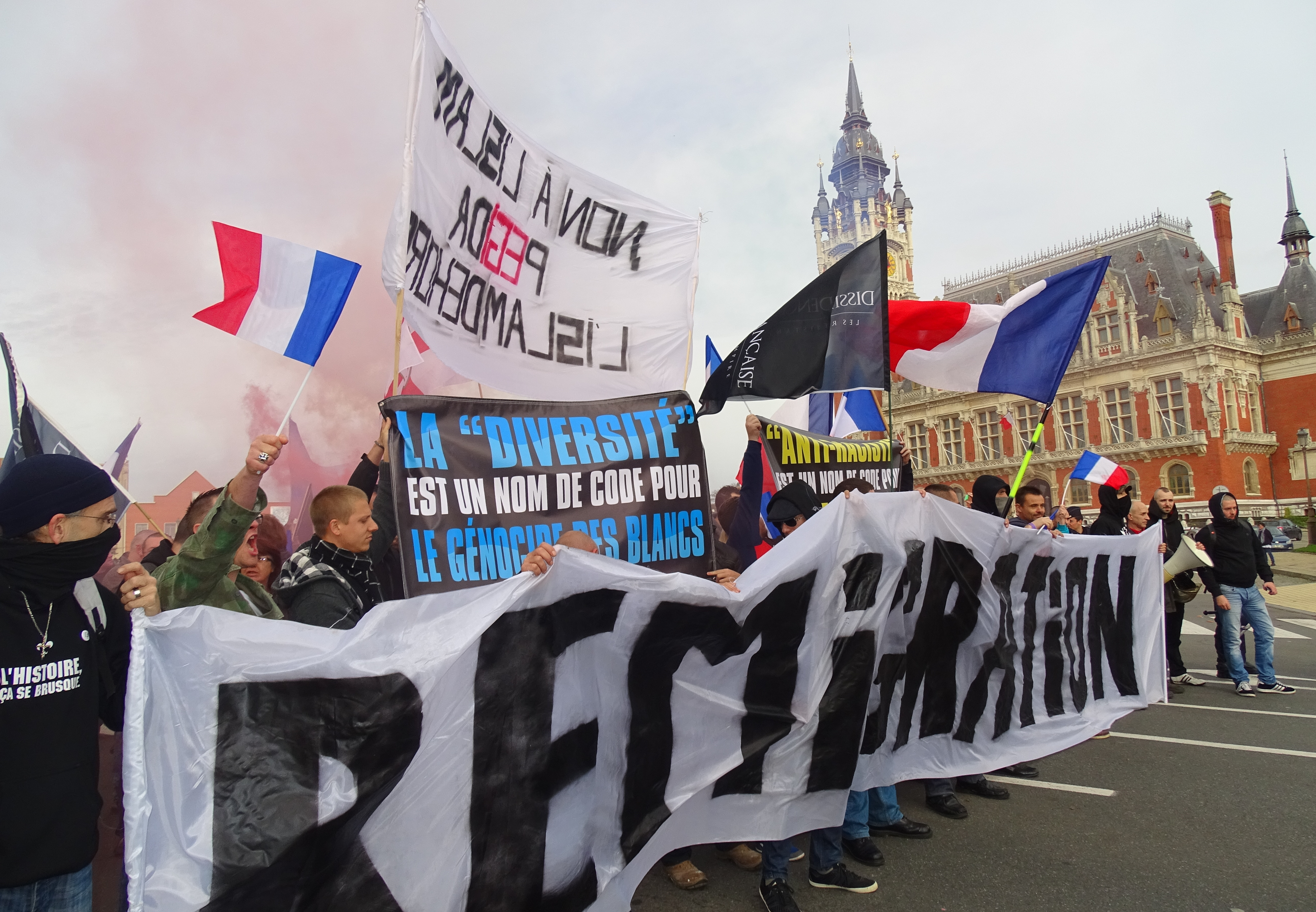
French protesters in Calais hold banners saying "Reimmigrate" and "Diversity is a code word for white genocide", 8 November 2015

A month after the demolition, the Refugee Youth Service (RYS) reported that while a little over half of the migrant children on its caseload had been relocated into French children's homes, another third—approximately 60 children—could no longer be located by child protection officers since being removed from the camp. The mass disappearance of these children from RYS surveillance echoed a similar loss of contact with nearly 130 children earlier in the year during the March 2016 demolition of the southern part of the Jungle, raising global concerns of exploitation and trafficking.

A few months after the demolition of the Jungle's northern zone, migrants began to return to the area, particularly those who had been refused asylum by the British government. According to figures provided by Le Monde, of the 1,934 minors who had left Calais in 2016, only 468 had been accepted to the U.K., leaving the vast majority of these underage refugees either stranded or missing. Help Refugees reported that by mid-January 2017 between 500 and 1,000 migrants, mostly unaccompanied minors, were living rough in Calais.

In February 2017, the mayor of Calais, Natacha Bouchart, faced global controversy for signing a decree banning the distribution of meals to refugees who had returned to the Jungle in order to prevent the reformation of "fixing points" (points de fixation) for refugees to regather. Although she claimed the ban to be a "humanly difficult" decision, Bouchart justified this administrative action by citing the harm that had been inflicted upon Calais and its residents as a result of the informal settlements that had long existed on the city's outskirts. The act was denounced by humanitarian organizations including Utopia 56 and L'Auberge des Migrants, who argued that humanitarian aid to refugees residing in Calais would provide a safer and healthier environment for refugees and permanent residents, particularly by preventing hunger-driven theft and infectious diseases.

Human Rights Watch published a report in July 2017 called Like Living in Hell, documenting what it described as continuing human rights abuses by the police against children and adult migrants in the region. It stated that nine months after the eviction, around 500 migrants remained living around Calais. Having interviewed over 60 migrants and more than 20 aid workers, the report noted that police, particularly the CRS (French riot police), were routinely spraying migrants, their possessions and their food and water with pepper spray.

Since the demolition of the Jungle in 2016, there has been a policy of "no fixation points" for migrants to settle in, aiming to stop another large camp from forming. Police, including the Compagnies Républicaines de Sécurité (CRS), and clearance teams regularly evict migrants from their makeshift camps with new encampments later forming in another or the same location. The encampments are dangerous due to exposure and poor living conditions resulting in health difficulties. The United Nations has repeatedly spoken out about what its experts say are unacceptable conditions for migrants in the area. A hostile environment is created for the migrants, with migrants and NGOs supporting migrants reporting violence from the police and the local administration occasionally banning the distribution of food and water to migrants.

On 11 October 2021, a Jesuit priest and two fellow activists started a hunger strike to ask the authorities to stop mistreatments of migrants.

The site of the Calais Jungle was turned into a nature reserve.

== In popular culture ==
- 2015: Written with Nadene Ghouri, The Lightless Sky is Gulwali Passarlay's memoir of his journey from Afghanistan to the UK as a twelve year old. Passarlay's time in the Jungle features in the book.
- 2016: French writer Emmanuel Carrere published a report in the magazine XXI about Calais and the Jungle titled "Letter to a Woman of Calais".
- 2016: Jérôme Sessini made a photo report for Magnum Photos about the Jungle.
- 2016: Comic book author Lisa Mandel and sociologist Yasmine Bouagga depict the daily lives of migrants in the Jungle through a blog, Les Nouvelles de la jungle, using interviews and observations from their personal excursions to Calais. They later compiled the comic strips into a book titled Les Nouvelles de la jungle de Calais, which won the Coup de Cœur 2017 of the Centre national de la littérature pour la jeunesse (BnF).
- 2017: Nicolas Klotz and Élisabeth Perceval launched a documentary film on the Calais Jungle: The Wild Frontier (original title: L'héroïque lande, la frontière brûle, France, 225 min.).
- 2017: Joe Robertson and Joe Murphy, who ran the Good Chance theatre in the camp, wrote a play entitled The Jungle. It premiered at the Young Vic in London and has since been performed in New York, San Francisco, and Minneapolis.
- 2017: Segments of Ai Weiwei's general release documentary film Human Flow were filmed in the Jungle.
- 2017: Pooja Puri's debut novel The Jungle tells the story of a teenager in the camp.
- 2017: Threads from the Refugee Crisis, an award-winning graphic novel by Kate Evans, depicts the work of volunteers in the Jungle and other encampments in northern France and their interactions with residents of the camps.
- 2018: The documentary film Calais Children: A Case to Answer made by Sue Clayton followed unaccompanied children before and after the final eviction.
- 2019: Roads, a film starring Fionn Whitehead and Stéphane Bak and directed by Sebastian Schipper, includes scenes set in migrant encampments and NGO workplaces in post-Jungle Calais.

== See also ==
- Basroch refugee camp
- Channel Tunnel: Illegal immigration
- Environmental racism in Europe
- Illegal immigration in the United Kingdom
- La Linière
- List of border crossing points in France
- Schengen Agreement
- Welcome (2009 film)
