= Basroch refugee camp =

Basroch refugee camp was situated in Grande-Synthe, Dunkirk, France. It began as an informal refugee camp in a muddy field in about 2006. As late as summer 2015, it still only contained about 60 residents, but by January 2016, the camp had expanded to more than 2000 people.

The very rapid expansion created a humanitarian crisis, as the site was not at all suitable for the large numbers of people who were living there. The rats, refuse, and disease led to it being referred to as "Europe's worst refugee camp." It was described as "appalling," "gut wrenching", and "deplorable."

The international NGO Médecins Sans Frontières stated:

Hygiene was dire in Basroch camp, and several areas became a muddy quagmire every time it rained. The mayor called it “the camp of shame” and MSF workers described it in interviews as a “gigantic refuse dump”

Aid organisations working at Basroch camp included Emmaüs, Terre d'Errance, Secours catholique et Secours populaire, Aid Box Convey and Edlumino, which provided education to the children of the camp.

== See also ==
- Migrants around Calais
- Calais Jungle
- La Linière
- Sangatte
- European migrant crisis
- Modern immigration to the United Kingdom
- Illegal immigration in the United Kingdom
- Channel Tunnel, § Illegal immigration
- Refugees of Iraq
- Edlumino
