= Migrants around Calais =

Group in northern France

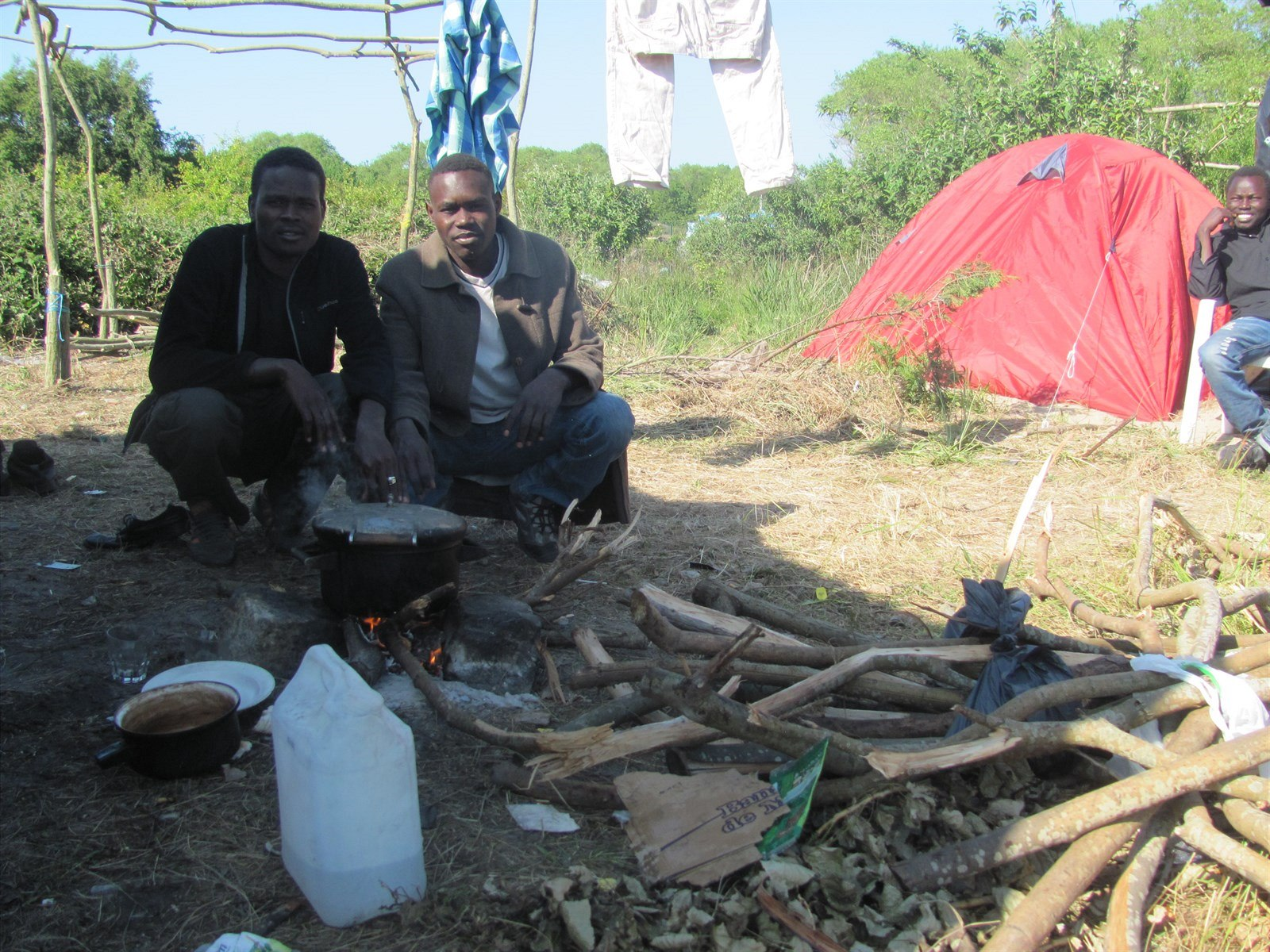
Sudanese migrants in Calais Jungle, June 2015

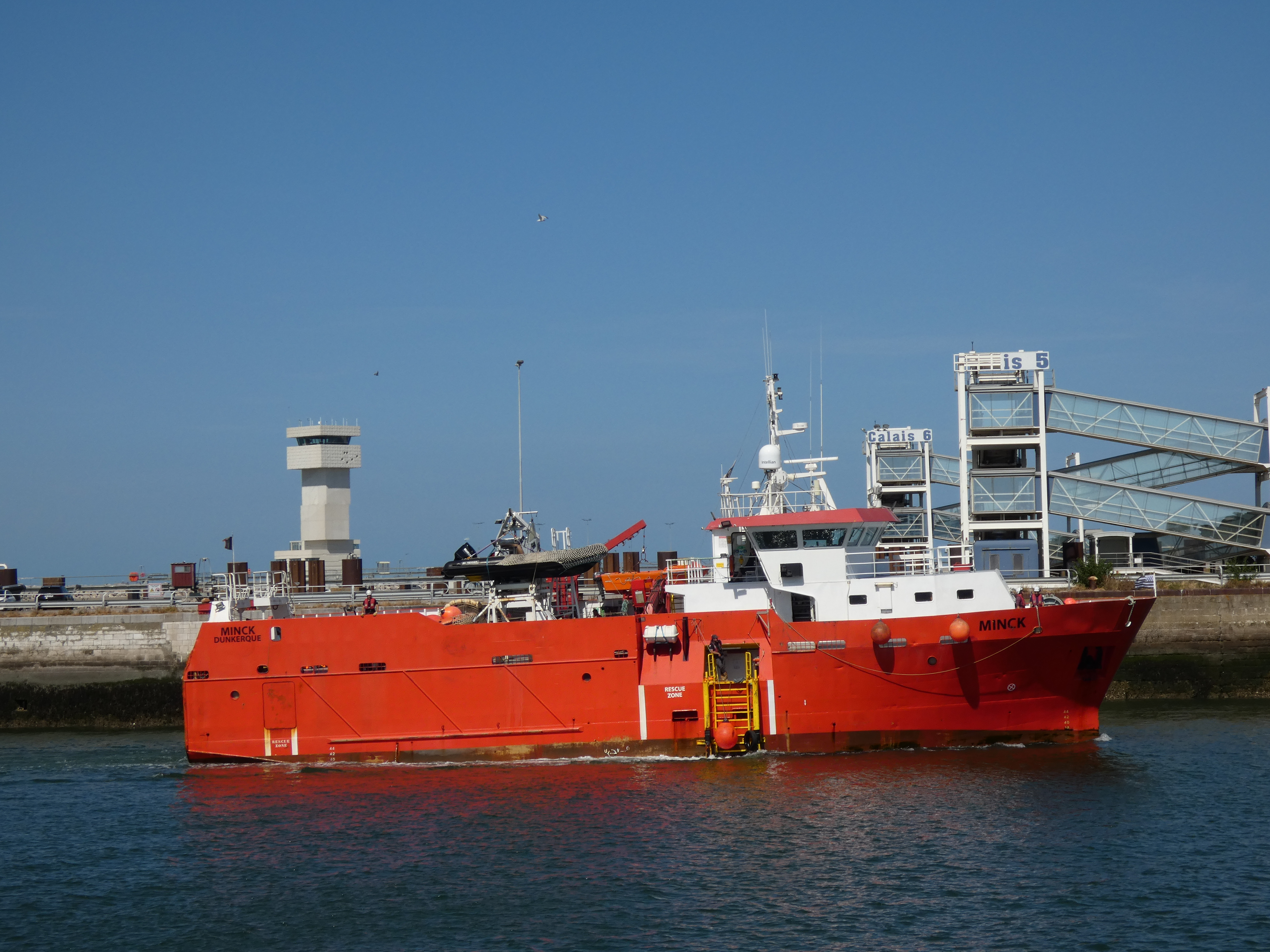
Rescue vessel Minck chartered by the French government, entering Calais harbour

Migrants have gathered in and around Calais, on the northern French coast, since at least the late 1990s seeking to enter the United Kingdom from the French port by crossing the Channel Tunnel or stowing away in the cargo area of lorries heading for ferries that cross the English Channel. During this time, informal camps of migrants have formed, the most notorious commonly referred to as the Calais Jungle. Other migrants come to the area because they are homeless while seeking asylum in France. The presence of migrants in and around Calais has affected the British and French governments, the Eurotunnel and P&O Ferries companies, and lorry drivers heading for the UK and their companies. EuroTunnel (now Getlink), the company that operates the Channel Tunnel, said that it intercepted more than 37,000 migrants between January and July 2015.

== Migrant population ==
=== Demographics ===
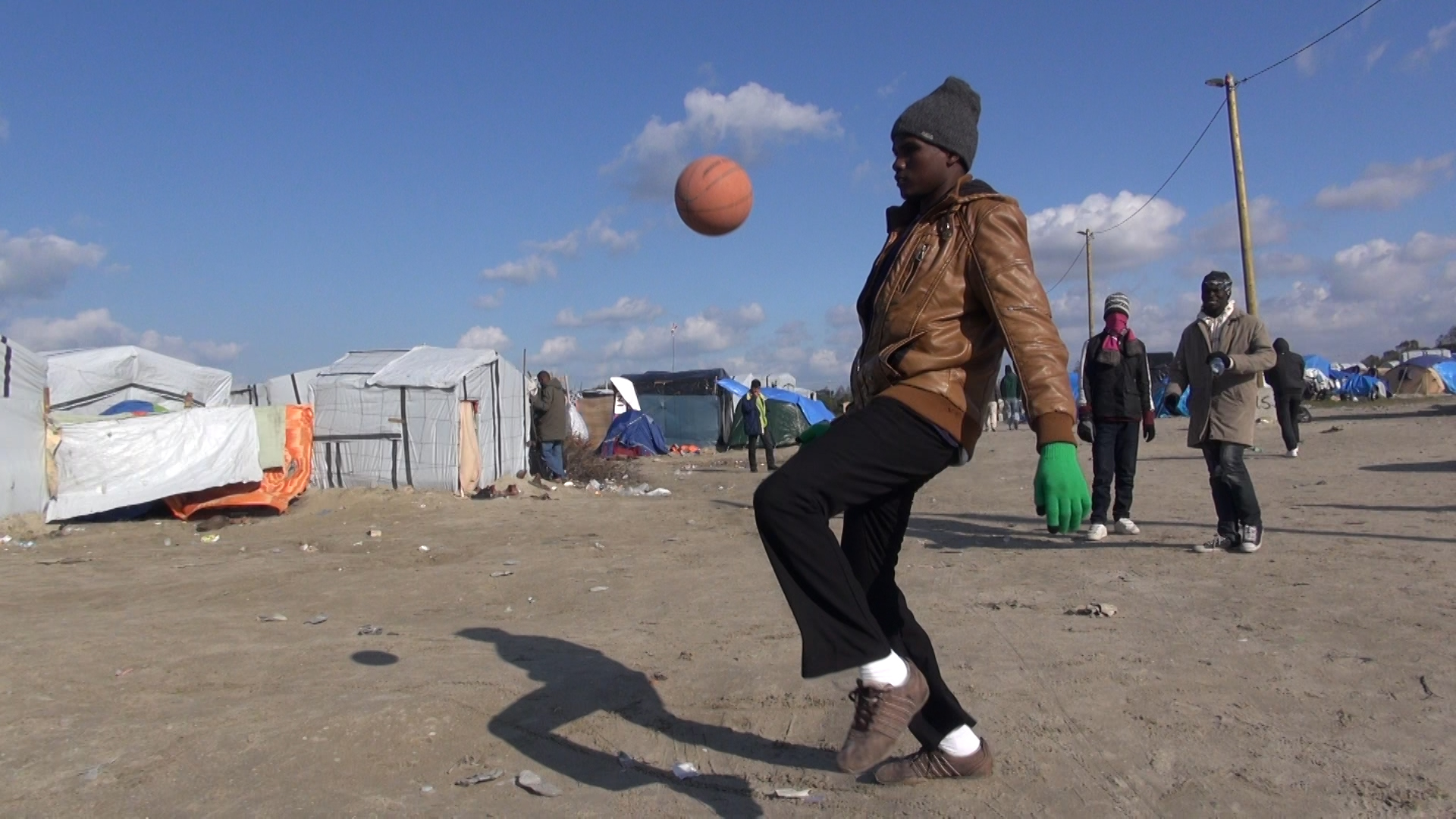
A young migrant dribbling a ball at the camp during October 2015

The migrant population around Calais has changed as global crises have changed. In the late 1990s, for instance, most people had travelled to the area to escape conflict in the Balkans. Nearly two decades later Kurdish Iraqis were the largest group, but by 2014 many people had begun to arrive from the Horn of Africa and Sudan. Many of the Kurdish Iraqis later moved to similar camps near Calais and Dunkirk.

Prior to the eviction of the large Jungle camp, a July 2016 survey of the population of the Calais Jungle by Help Refugees counted 7,307 migrants (of which 761 were minors): the largest number to date. At that time, the population was increasing by an average of 50 people per day. After the Brexit vote on 23 June 2016, the population had reportedly increased to nearly 10,000. An estimated 62% of the migrants were young men; the migrants' average age was 33. Most of them do not speak French.

=== Motivation ===
Calais is the closest geographical point to the UK in mainland Europe. It is a significant trade hub, with millions of tons of goods passing through each day, to and from Great Britain, by truck, train, and ship. This increases the potential for migrants to stow away on vehicles passing through, as well as the economic costs of the disruption that they cause. Migrants in the area who want to reach the UK do so for a number of reasons. For instance, some prefer the UK to other European countries due to greater economic growth (thus making them economic migrants), and the relative ease of finding illegal undocumented work, the latter being due to the application of habeas corpus preventing the checking of migrants' identification in some situations. The UK is also a desirable destination because English is a widely known language, and because it is easier to reach than other English speaking destinations such as the United States, Canada, Australia, and New Zealand. Still others have a family connection with the UK. Some migrants in the area have paid smugglers - sometimes thousands of pounds - to help them on their journey and/or to help them attempt to reach the UK. Migrants risk their lives when they try to climb aboard or travel on vehicles, occasionally falling off and injuring themselves or dying. Not every migrant in Calais is trying to get to the UK, however: some are seeking asylum in France but are homeless because the French system does not provide for them while their claim is being processed.

=== Conditions ===
Apart from the camp in Sangatte (closed 2002) and the one in Grande-Synthe during the mayoral administration of Damien Carême, the camps are informal and have appeared in various locations along the northern coast since the 1990s. Since the demolition of the large Jungle camp in 2016 there has been an administrative policy of "no fixation points" for migrants to settle in, aiming to stop another large camp from forming. Police, including the Compagnies Républicaines de Sécurité (CRS), and clearance teams regularly evict migrants from their makeshift camps, but new encampments later form there or elsewhere. The encampments are dangerous due to exposure and poor living conditions resulting in health difficulties. Authorities create a hostile environment; migrants and non-governmental organisations (NGOs) report police violence directed at migrants and the local administration occasionally bans the distribution of food and water.

== Reactions ==
=== Legal framework ===
==== Treaties ====
The laws for processing of migrants and management of the situation are set by bilateral agreements between the UK and France relating to the Channel Tunnel. Bilateral agreements include the 1991 Sangatte Protocol regarding border controls in Coquelles and Folkestone, which was later supplemented by the 2003 Touquet Treaty, which increased the powers of the police at the border, and defines the obligations of the UK and France to accept refugees.

==== French rule of law ====
When the French justice system determines that a person is in France illegally, an obligation de quitter le territoire français (OQTF) - an order to leave France or be deported to a country of origin - can be issued. This is defined in the Code of Entry and Residence of Foreigners and of the Right to Asylum).

However, many of the camps' inhabitants lack identification and even a legal identity in their countries of origin, as is the case with many people of Eritrean, Ethiopian, and Sudanese nationality. For a person in this situation, an OQTF cannot be issued, either because it is unclear to what country the person should be deported, or because neither their countries of origin nor other countries in the Schengen Area will accept them.

==== Security measures ====
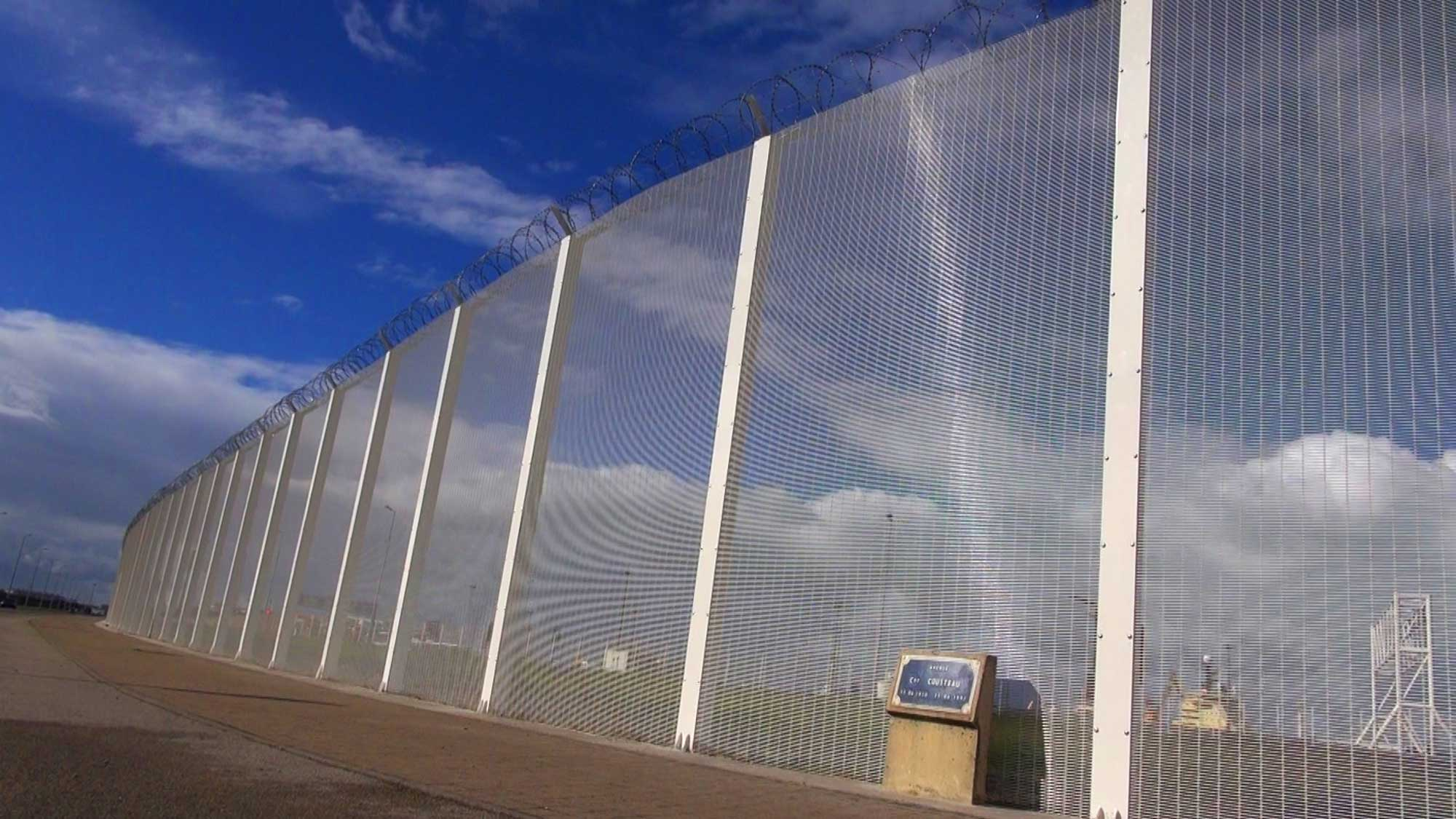
Fencing in Calais

Britain and France operate a system of juxtaposed controls on immigration and customs, whereby border checks take place prior to boarding, so once stowaways are in a vehicle in the tunnel, they are able to enter the UK without further checks. To discourage vehicle operators from facilitating this, lorry drivers are fined £2,000 per stowaway, if a migrant is discovered in their vehicle.

On 20 August 2015, Theresa May, who was then UK Home Secretary, arrived in Calais with Bernard Cazeneuve, the French Minister of the Interior, to confirm a new agreement to address the situation. The agreement invested £7 million in new security measures, including basing British police officers in a new control centre in Calais that regularly reported to May and Cazeneuve regarding immigration-related criminal activities on both sides of the Channel. The port of Calais is protected by 5-meter tall fences topped with coils of razor wire and surveillance cameras. Additional fencing is being constructed along the motorway leading to the port. The UK is investing £3 million in heartbeat and carbon dioxide detectors, and dog searches, for UK-bound lorries in France.

Emmanuel Macron, the President of France, has called for the situation to be addressed through more security at the periphery of the European Union to prevent people from entering the EU irregularly.

=== Other political reactions ===
In August 2015, Vincent Cochetel, the director for Europe at the United Nations High Commissioner for Refugees, described the crisis as a "civil emergency". Later that month, Yvette Cooper, the UK Shadow Home Secretary, said that the United Nations had to intervene in the crisis in order to stop the French government from allowing people to try to enter the UK illegally, and on 20 August, Theresa May, then the UK Home Secretary, expressed concern that the crisis could spread to other ports, such as Dunkirk.

In 2015, Nigel Farage, at the time leader of the U.K. Independence Party (UKIP), called for the military to search incoming vehicles to address a "lawless, scary" situation.

=== Public reactions ===
==== Solidarity ====
Members of the public and grassroots organisations have supported migrants around Calais. Some Calasians host migrants in their homes or join together to support migrants with food and material aid. People from outside France have also migrated to Calais to support those living rough. No Borders activists have also supported migrants around Calais. The number of people who have helped migrants in Calais is in the thousands.

==== Calais blockade ====
On 5 September 2016, truck drivers, local farmers, and trade unionists, protesting against "wilful destruction" by migrants residing in the camps, slowed traffic entering the port of Calais, demanding the closure of the Jungle.

== History ==
=== Sangatte migrants camp (1999–2002) ===
In the late 1990s growing numbers of migrants, including women and children, were sleeping in the streets of Calais and surrounding towns. Most were hoping to enter the UK, either through the Channel Tunnel under, or by the P&O Ferries over the English Channel. In 1999, at the request of the French government, the French Red Cross opened a refugee camp in Sangatte in a giant warehouse about 800 metres (0.50 mi) from the entrance to the Channel Tunnel. Sangatte was planned to house 600 people, but by 2002 it held 2,000. living in squalid conditions.

Tensions between ethnic groups in Sangatte for the best places from which to board trains at the Fréthun EuroTunnel rail freight terminal grew, as it was 5 km (3.1 mi) from Calais. In 2001, EuroTunnel called on France to shut the camp, stating that they were stopping 200 refugees each night, mostly from Sangatte, who aimed to smuggle themselves into Britain. On Christmas Day 2001, a large group of people broke through all security barriers, and 500 of them stormed the Channel Tunnel. By 2002, the Eurotunnel company had spent £6 million (€8 million) on security measures around the 650-hectare (1,600-acre) terminal site, such as fences, razor wire, cameras, and security guards patrolling daily.

On 3 December 2002, the French Minister of the Interior, Nicolas Sarkozy, announced that the camp at Sangatte would be closed on 30 December 2002. In exchange, the British government would accept 1,000 Kurdish refugees and some 250 Afghans—80% of the migrants in Sangate—who would all receive a work permit for three months. The remaining people received a residence permit in France.

=== Various 'jungle' camps (2002–2014) ===
Since 2002, migrants in Calais slept in squats, slums and outdoor camps known as "jungles" that were repeatedly raided or bulldozed by police before cropping up elsewhere, and they ate from charity soup kitchens. Migrants caught during an attempt to hide aboard a lorry would be taken to the police station, where they would receive a warning and be released. In 2009, the UN Refugee Agency set up a permanent office in Calais to offer asylum advice to migrants.

In April 2009, the police raided and bulldozed a camp and arrested 190 migrants. This camp, in the woods around Calais, was reestablished, with tents made out of metal grilles and plastic sheeting and wooden shelters, housing 700–800 mainly Afghan migrants. It was unsanitary. It was raided again in September 2009, and 276 protesting migrants were arrested and put on buses. Bulldozers were expected to destroy their shelters later that day. The jungle inhabitants were partly imprisoned at the nearby Centre de Rétention of Coquelles; many more were taken to detention centres all over France before being released and making the journey back to Calais by foot. After the closing of this camp, the French authorities threatened to repatriate "sans-papiers" ("immigrés en situation irrégulière") to Afghanistan.

In July 2014, the French police once again expelled migrants from a camp in Calais.

==== Rushes on Channel ferries (2014) ====
By September 2014, some 1,200 to 1,500 migrants, mainly Eritreans, Sudanese, Afghans, Somalis and Syrians, lived in makeshift camps or disused buildings in Calais and made regular attempts to hide in lorries bound to cross the Channel to Britain.

On 4 September, at the P&O Ferry docks of Calais, 100 migrants forced open a gate, climbed over fences and tried to storm onto a ferry to Britain. One ship's crew used their fire hoses to prevent them from boarding.

Days later, 250 migrants tried to storm into vehicles at a lorry park that were about to cross to the UK; the police scattered them with tear gas.

On 17 September 250 migrants, after tearing down fences and cutting wire, rushed lorries queuing to board ferries; police used tear gas and baton charges to chase them away.

After those incidents, the British government promised to contribute up to £12 million (€14 million) to the French to help prevent people from crossing the Channel to Britain illegally.

By October, the number of migrants at Calais was 1,500. In mid-October, 350 migrants again tried to climb aboard trucks at Calais in an attempt to reach Britain; the riot police (CRS) used tear gas to disperse them.

=== Jules Ferry day centre and 'new jungle' camp (2015–2016) ===
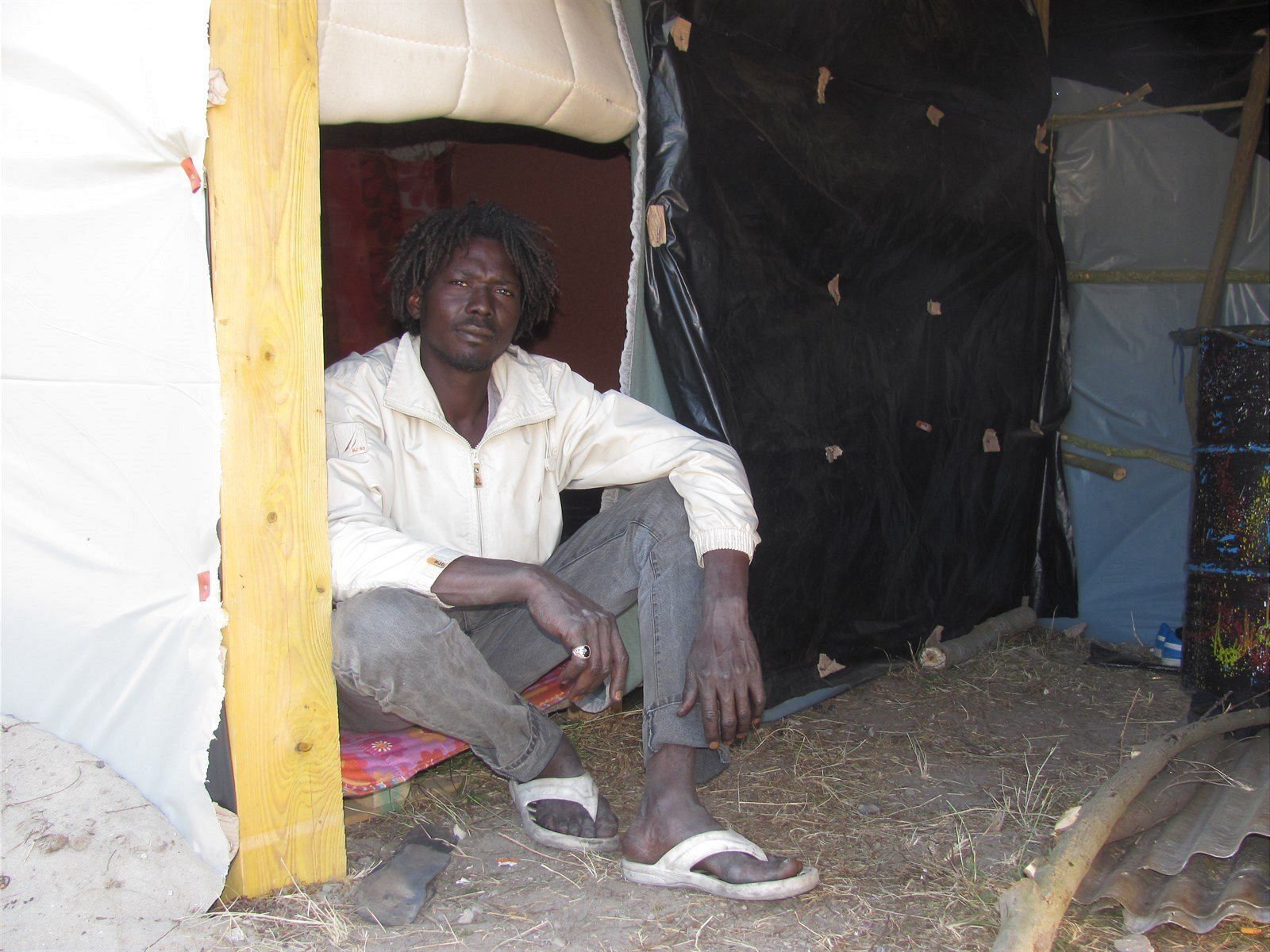
A Sudanese migrant sits in his self-constructed cottage in the New Jungle, June 2015

In January 2015, the French government opened the Jules Ferry day centre for migrants in a former children's holiday camp on the outskirts of Calais. It was intended to provide overnight accommodation for 50 women and children (but not to men), one hot meal per day and daytime showers and toilets (to everyone including men), and mobile phone charging.

By April 2015, over 1,000 men were sleeping rough next to the centre on wasteland and a shanty town emerged that became called "the new jungle" - and later simply the Jungle. Charity workers said that 100 people in the "new jungle" had already claimed asylum in France but still had no accommodation. A camp has also sprung up in Dunkirk, around 40 km from Calais. Most of the migrants were Kurdish Iraqis.

In early June 2015, the police dismantled some smaller encampments in Calais. By mid-June, the city council of Calais estimated 3,000 migrants to be living in encampments. As of November 2015, there were an estimated 6,000 migrants living in the camp. According to the United Nations High Commissioner for Refugees, ten people had died trying to cross the Channel Tunnel since the start of June 2015. As of October 2016, just prior to its dismantling, 'Help Refugees' put the number in the camp at 8,143.

Starting on 24 October 2016, the French government planned to evacuate 6,400 migrants from the encampment in 170 buses with the intent of resettling the migrants in different regions of France. On 26 October 2016, French authorities announced that the camp had been cleared of all migrants.

=== Truck driver attacks (2015–present) ===
Since the start of the European migrant crisis, truck drivers heading for the UK have been threatened and attacked by people trying to reach the UK. In December 2015, 13 trucks were hit with stones, with people trying to jump into trucks from motorway overpasses. In March 2016, a truck driver was assaulted, sustaining minor injuries, while his truck was also damaged. In August 2016, a driver was threatened with a chainsaw by those wishing to board trucks to the UK. Truck drivers have also violently confronted people found stowed away in their trucks, and one Hungarian truck driver filmed how he directed his truck towards a group of people that hurled rocks at his truck, only to swerve away from them as part of an intimidation tactic.

The first death was recorded on 20 June 2017, when people trying to reach the UK stopped a lorry on the A16 autoroute with a tree trunk, in order to stowaway in the cargo area. A van registered in Poland hit the lorry and burst into fire, killing the van driver. Nine people from Eritrea were arrested in connection with the incident.

In July 2017 a lorry driver was repeatedly beaten over the head with a brick after stepping out of the cab to confront a group of migrants attempting to stow away in his trailer. After leaving the driver bloodied and unconscious on the side of the road, the migrants hijacked the lorry and attempted to drive it towards the port before being apprehended several miles away.

==== Calais blockade ====
The Calais blockade was a 2016 protest in France in response to the Calais Jungle. Lorry drivers and farmers used their vehicles on the A16 motorway to slow down entry to the Port of Calais. The camp had become the focal point of France's migrant crisis, with about 7,000 people, mainly from the Middle East, Afghanistan and Africa, living there.

The protest also attracted a number of local trade unions and Calais protestors. The protest calls for the closure and removal of the camp. The president of the Association of Calais Traders said "We will not budge from the motorway until the state gives us the dates for the total demolition of the northern zone of the Jungle."

This protest marks the first time the Association of Calais Traders has taken a physical approach to protesting the migrant camp.

=== Since the demolition of the Jungle (2016-present) ===
Since the demolition of the large Jungle camp in 2016 there has been an administrative policy of "no fixation points" for migrants to settle in, aiming to stop another large camp from forming. Police, including the Compagnies Républicaines de Sécurité (CRS), and clearance teams regularly evict migrants from their makeshift camps with new encampments later forming in another or the same location. The encampments are dangerous due to exposure and poor living conditions resulting in health difficulties. A hostile environment is created for the migrants, with migrants and NGOs reporting violence from the police directed at migrants and the local administration occasionally banning the distribution of food and water to migrants.

==== Tension between migrant groups (2018) ====
On 1 February 2018, fighting broke out between a group of Afghan and Eritrean migrants in the French port city of Calais. The fighting left five people with gunshot wounds and another 17 with other injuries, including stab wounds. Local officials and police believed that a 37-year-old Afghan man was responsible for the shootings. Several separate incidents occurred during the afternoon of that day following unrest between the two groups at a food distribution point. The incidents unfolded individually at the city outskirts, an industrial site and near the location of the old Jungle camp.

== Migrant sites in France outside Calais ==
Other smaller migrant sites exist in France outside Calais. The Association Terre d'Errance estimates that eleven camps exist in the northern part of the country. The largest of these is the Grande-Synthe site near Dunkirk. On that site, in the first and older camp of Basroch refugee camp, migrants (mostly Iraqi Kurdish families) lived under deplorable conditions on a boggy wasteland site, without adequate sanitation facilities or shelter. The camp was cited as being worse than Calais. In March 2016, as demolition work was taking place at the Jungle site in Calais, a new camp called La Liniere refugee camp was developed at the Grande-Synthe site - "France's first ever refugee camp to meet international humanitarian standards." It opened with 200 of 375 projected cabins already built by Medecins Sans Frontieres. A total capacity of 2,500 people was expected. Traffickers sexually abused migrants, both women and children, by raping them in exchange for blankets, food or opportunity to get to the UK.

Other than Calais and Grande-Synthe, encampments were reported to exist in 2015 in Paris, Dieppe, Boulogne and Le Havre.

== See also ==
- Channel Tunnel, § Asylum and immigration
- Asylum shopping
- Modern immigration to the United Kingdom
  - Illegal immigration in the United Kingdom
- English Channel migrant crossings
- La Liniere refugee camp
- Basroch refugee camp
- Calais Jungle
- France–UK border
