= Super Slim Me =

2007 British television documentary

- Directed by: Lee Phillips
- Written by: Lee Phillips
- Produced by: Lee Phillips
- Starring: Dawn O'Porter
- Cinematography: Lee Phillips
- Edited by: Rick Aplin
- Distributed by: BBC
- Release date: 2007
- Running time: 60 minutes
- Country: United Kingdom
- Language: English

Super Slim Me is a TV documentary presented by British writer and television presenter Dawn O'Porter. It was broadcast in the UK by BBC Three on 25 February 2007. Porter attempted to shrink her UK size 12 figure to a US size zero. Surviving on a diet of 500 calories a day, Porter investigated the stylists, designers and agencies responsible for making skinniness desirable for followers of fashion.

The title is based on the American film Super Size Me, in which the author consumed McDonald's daily for a month.

== Content ==
=== Experiment ===
Over the course of an eight-week period, O’Porter challenged herself to go on a crash diet in order to drop from the nation’s average, UK Size 12, to a US Size 0. This aspired image has been formed by skinny celebrities over the past decade, who are influencing the attitudes that predominately teenage girls have about their bodies. The images of skinny celebrities in the media also convey the message that being thin is a form of acceptance. However, it was also through this experimental crash diet that O’Porter showed her audience both the physical and psychological effects of this lifestyle.

Throughout the eight-week time period, O’Porter's actions were documented by a BBC film crew. During this process, O’Porter met with fashion designers, stylists, modeling agencies, as well as medical experts to find out what it would take to drop her dress size to a US Size 0 (UK Size 4). She soon found out that in order for her to succeed, her calorie intake had to decrease from the recommended 2000 calories a day, to a maximum of 500 calories a day. Even after finishing the first day of her experiment, O' Porter’s attitude had changed and she experienced obsessive behaviours, as well as mood swings, as a result of her hunger. By the end of her diet, the psychological effects worsened leading to irritability, insomnia, and lack of energy.

=== Results ===
After eight weeks of sticking to a strict diet of only 500 calories and constantly working out, Dawn was both physically and mentally exhausted. With this crash diet she was losing sleep, feeling depressed every day and feeling constantly weak. Her results ended up in a 69 cm waist and a weight of 59 kilos leaving her total weight loss at 17 pounds. This resulted in her dropping two dress sizes. Her BMI before she started the diet was 22. She ended the eight-week diet with a BMI of 19.

== See also ==
- The Truth About Size Zero
