= Escape from Genopolis =

Book by Tess Berry-Hart

- First edition (publ. Scholastic)
- Author: T. E. Berry-Hart
- Publisher: Scholastic
- Publication date: January 1, 2007
- ISBN: 9780439943109

Escape From Genopolis is the first of a trilogy of young-adult futuristic-fiction novels by T. E. Berry-Hart, published in 2007 by Scholastic. It uses many of the same themes of genetic engineering, social engineering, totalitarianism, environmental issues, eugenics and ethics as Brave New World, Nineteen Eighty-Four, Do Androids Dream of Electric Sheep? and The Day of the Triffids.

== Background ==
Genopolis is a futuristic city, established in 2064, after the known world has been wiped out through environmental upheaval caused by global warming. The Citizens of Genopolis are humans who have been genetically engineered to withstand the great extremes of flood and fire, but with the result that they cannot feel pain or emotion. Therefore, they can no longer feel love, mercy, compassion or friendship, and these words have become obsolete and forgotten. Although Genopolis is advanced in many ways, it is also primitive, because the Citizens are served by slaves and rely on barter instead of money; while the buildings and people are decaying because pain no longer acts as an early warning system against disease and injury, so it is very easy to die of a simple scratch. Outside the walls of Genopolis live the Naturals, the remnants of the former human race, hiding in the caves and ruined buildings of the Regions. Naturals can still feel pain and emotion, but are being hunted down and destroyed to provide blood and spare parts for the Citizens.

== Plot summary ==
Arlo, a ten-year-old orphan boy, lives in Genopolis, in a university called the Inn of Court, where he is looked after by his mentor, Doctor Ignatius. One day Arlo makes a horrifying discovery. Instead of being a Citizen, he is actually one of the hated Naturals, who had been abandoned by his Natural parents when he was born and taken into the care of Doctor Ignatius, ostensibly to research emotions and pain for scientific purposes. However, Ignatius is also leader of a secret resistance circle against the Rulers of Genopolis, and plans to destroy Genopolis by bringing back pain to its Citizens. However, Ignatius’s plans – and Arlo – are now in danger because a new Ruler of Genopolis has been appointed who is opposed to any research that could bring back the past. From the moment that Arlo first sets eyes on the new Regis, he feels a powerful connection, and knows that if he falls into the hands of the Regis then his life will be forfeit.

Meanwhile, Usha, an eleven-year-old slave-girl, lives in drudgery, serving her ninety-nine-year-old Citizen mistress who she calls Auntie. Usha is a Gemini, a member of a clone-class who have been bred in the pharms, and whose orders are only to obey her superiors. However, Usha soon becomes aware that Auntie’s intention is to use her to clone her own dying body. Waking up in panic on the operating table, Usha escapes, but with the whole of Genopolis on her tail, there is nowhere that she can run to.

Arlo escapes from the Inn of Court and the murderous Regis, and with his dog Rem is sent first to the Inn of the Maia, a female Inn of Court, and after that to a rich man and his family, sympathisers of Ignatius's cause. However, in the escape, his beloved dog Rem is lost.

Wandering through the sewers, the underworld of Genopolis, Usha falls in with a gang of abandoned children, who have been thrown out of society because of becoming disabled through accidents or illness. Their ringleader, Ozzie, inducts Usha into his gang, and for a time they live by pilfering from the warehouses by the port where the food is delivered from the pharms. After a botched robbery, Usha is kidnapped by smugglers and sold to the Circus, a semi-illegal underworld gladiatorial arena, where criminal Citizens, escaped Gemini and the occasional captured Natural fight against themselves, and against genetically-engineered monsters.

The laboratories of the pharms (which provide food, replacing the historical farms) have created hybrid animals along the lines of classical monsters using genetic fusion technology; the Minotaur, the Gorgon, the Cockatrice and the Sphinx. Usha is dispatched to fight in the Circus, where she befriends Talia, a female gladiator, and the other slaves. In the pits of the Circus, Usha meets Arlo's dog Rem. When Arlo comes to the Circus as a guest of the rich man, he sees Rem and runs into the pit to be reunited with him. Together they escape from the Minotaur who is hunting them, and disappear into the sewers once more.

Usha, Rem and Arlo, together with the friends they have met in the Circus and Ozzie's gang from the underworld, escape the island of Genopolis by boat, and find their way to the Natural outerlands. Here they are reunited with Arlo's sister, Kira, and join the Natural tribe.

Meanwhile, back in Genopolis, the Regis broods over the missing Arlo and plans his revenge.

Continued in: Fearless (c) 2009, Scholastic Books)

== Major themes ==
Genopolis draws on themes of both classical and modern literature. It is set in a future state that is founded on many of the ideals of Rome and Greece, from its social structure (the division of its inhabitants into Senators, Citizens, soldiers, and slave-Gemini) to many of its pastimes, such as the Circus, a semi-illegal gladiatorial arena where escaped criminals, dishonoured Citizens fight against each other or against recreated monsters, and its mythical creatures such as the Minotaur and the Gorgons, genetically created using new technology.

== Reception ==
Escape from Genpolis received mostly positive reviews from the literary press. The Book Bag described it as 'a thoroughly entertaining, thought-provoking and well-written book', and Write Away described it as 'an intriguing and pacey story with engaging characters'
