= Edlumino =

UK nonprofit organization

Edlumino Education Aid is a nonprofit charity working to improve education for disadvantaged and displaced children around the world. It is a non-governmental organisation (NGO) registered with the UK Charity Commission as charity number 1166131. Edlumino is based in Cambridge and the date of registration was 18 March 2016.

== Work in France ==
Edlumino worked in the Calais Jungle during the Autumn of 2015, providing education to the Syrian and Kurdish children living there. Teachers worked out of community huts in the camp and taught in the open air when there were too many pupils.

In addition, Edlumino set up a makeshift school in the Basroch refugee camp where they taught 300 children. Many UK schools donated resources and many UK teachers volunteered to work with Edlumino, in order to ensure that classes could be continued until the camp closed. Whilst based in Basroch refugee camp Edlumino taught in the open air and worked out of a series of tents, re-engaging children who had been out of education for several years.

After the closure of Basroch refugee camp Edlumino moved and commenced work in the new camp of La Liniere refugee camp. In this camp Edlumino continued to provide education to several hundred Kurdish children. As part of their work with the children Edlumino has raised concerns about the numbers of children going missing.

Edlumino finished working in France after a transition project to transfer the refugee children from La Liniere camp in to the French education system.

== Work in Greece ==
In Greece Edlumino carried out work teaching children in the Faneromeni refugee camp at Eleousa near Ioannina in the Epirus region of central Greece. The population in that camp were mainly Yazidi.

As well as direct teaching of children in the camps, Edlumino also provided training and support to other educational programmes in the Thessaloniki region of Northern Greece.

== Work in the UK ==
In the Autumn of 2016 Edlumino was one of the UK charities which worked to put in place measures to support unaccompanied minors during the closure of the Calais Jungle.

Edlumino carries out work in the UK visiting schools and talking to pupils to raise awareness about the issues affecting refugee children around the world. Edlumino also works with UK teachers to offer training, support and opportunities for teachers to refresh their educational purpose and mission.

In addition, Edlumino works with teenage refugee children in the UK, providing advice and support to ensure that they get the education which they need.

== See also ==
- Educational equity
- Female education
- Freedom of education
- World Education Forum
- Universal access to education
