= Jaz O'Hara =

British activist (born 1990)

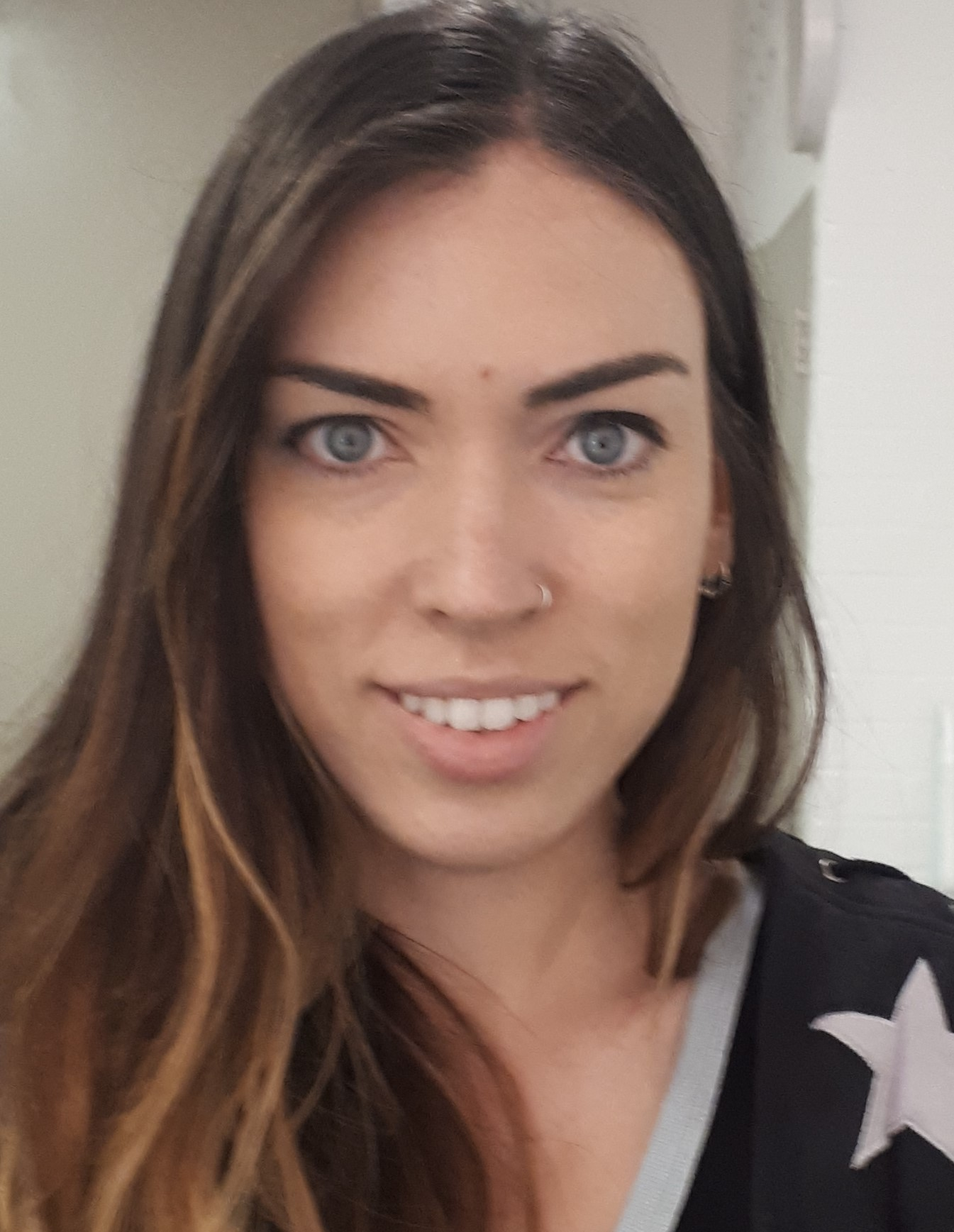
- O'Hara (at Amnesty International, London on 20 May 2018)
- Born: Jasmin O'Hara; 10 April 1990 (age 35); Bromley, England
- Occupation: Refugee rights campaigner
- Title: Founder of Worldwide Tribe
- Jaz O'Hara's voice recorded 20 May 2018

Jasmin O'Hara (born 10 April 1990) is a British woman human rights defender working in the field of international refugee support, and founder of Asylum Speakers.

== Early life ==
O'Hara was born in Bromley in southeast London. She studied fashion, and initially worked for ethical clothing companies.

== Activism ==
In August 2015 Jaz O'Hara was one of a group of friends that visited the so-called Jungle refugee camp in Calais, France, intending to make a documentary; shocked by what she found, she wrote a Facebook post that gathered over 65,000 shares overnight, leading to a fund-raising campaign. What started as a crowd-sourcing for a one-off trip to take some supplies to the Calais camp accumulated a huge volume of donations of physical goods (stored in multiple London warehouses, then taken to Calais in 40 vehicles), and raised £150,000 in a matter of weeks under the banner of CalAid.

As O'Hara's human rights activism extended beyond Calais, she founded, with her brother Nils, the Worldwide Tribe charity. Its activities have resulted in Wi-Fi being installed in refugee camps in France and Greece, supported a search-and-rescue operation in the Mediterranean Sea, and provided food, clothing, shelter and other support to people on the move elsewhere in Europe and in the Middle East, including an arts project in Jordan.
