= La Linière =

French refugee camp

La Linière was a refugee camp situated in Grande-Synthe, Dunkirk, France. A scaled-back version of an originally much larger plan, the camp opened in March 2016 at a cost of around 4 million Euros.

La Linière housed up to 1500 migrants when it opened with a population which was mainly Iraqi Kurds. The numbers fluctuated considerably during its time rising from around 600 in the summer of 2016 to 1600 in the autumn of 2016. The camp was supported by AFEJI, MSF, Utopia 56, OFII, Edlumino Education Aid and others.

The camp was troubled during its existence and there were allegations that women and children were being subject to rape and beatings in the camp, and that many of the children were simply disappearing. The French government also cited shooting and stabbing violence as issues of concern in the camp.

The camp closed following a fire which occurred after fighting between Afghan and Kurdish residents of the camp in April 2017.

== See also ==
- Calais Jungle
- Edlumino
- European migrant crisis
- Illegal immigration in the United Kingdom
- Migrants around Calais
- Modern immigration to the United Kingdom
- Refugees of Iraq
- Sangatte
