= Asylum in France =

Seeking asylum in France is a legal right that is admitted by the constitution of France. Meanwhile, the status of recognized asylum seekers is protected by corresponding laws and the Convention Relating to the Status of Refugees, which France signed on the 25 July 1951. France is considered to be one of the main asylum host countries in Europe. According to statistics collected by the World Bank, in 2021 there were 499,914 refugees registered in France. Asylum policies in France are regarded as a concerned topic among the public and politicians, and some controversies also exist in the current system of French asylum policies, such as issues on the assimilation policy, national security problems and living conditions of asylum seekers.

== Laws and procedures ==
=== Status of asylum seekers ===
The legal status of seeking asylum in France is guaranteed under the Asylum and Immigration Law. Generally, two types of asylum protections are classified by the French asylum law: Refugee status and Subsidiary status. The Refugee status formally would be given to persons satisfying conditions which defined by Convention Relating to the Status of Refugees of UNHCR. Meanwhile, the subsidiary status could be possibly given to any other type of asylum seekers who do not meet the criteria of a refugee status recognition. Generally, one can be given a subsidiary status as long as he/she proves risks of a threat or serious harm to their personal safety once they return to their origin country.

Besides, any of the following situations mentioned by the asylum law could lead to the denial of applications:

(a) An overt threat could be seen and proven if the applicant wishes to enter French territory;

(b) A previous sentence or punishment for terrorism had been imposed on the applicant, which would be regarded as a serious harm to the French society.

On 2 July 2020, the European Court of Human Rights (ECHR) condemned France for the “inhuman and degrading living conditions” of three asylum seekers. They lived for months on the streets with no means to meet their basic requirements such as food, housing and health-care.

=== Asylum at airports ===
During the late 1980's border guards in France would often refuse to register asylum requests. According to the Pew Research Center in 2017, France had the fourth highest number of unauthorized immigrants among European Union and European Free Trade Association Countries. The total number of immigrants living in France made up 10% of the population. However, only 1% of the population was made of unauthorized immigrants.

=== Applications ===
All asylum seekers must have entered French territory before starting their formal application, otherwise it cannot be accepted. To satisfy this condition, applicants can either request a special visa for asylum application from a French embassy/console or get a temporary visa for up to 8 days at the crossing point of the French border. Next, asylum seekers will need to register themselves as "asylum seekers" in a "GUDA", which refers to a single-desk contact point, and get a formal certificate which allows them to lodge the application form. Some of the documents needed are as shown below:

1) Information required to prove civil status;

2) Documents confirming legal entry into French territory, including a legal entry visa;

3) A record of the route taken from the country of origin to France.

4) If it exists, the current dwelling address of the applicant in France.

Then, applicants can formally apply for asylum status. In addition, applicants also need to write an explanation in French that clarifies their intention for seeking asylum in France.

=== Proceeding ===
Currently, the OFPRA (French Office for the Protection of Refugees and Stateless Persons) takes charge of all asylum affairs and application proceedings for France. After receiving applications, OFPRA starts an investigation into each applicant from evaluating submitted documents to assessments of personal circumstances, including the situation of the country of origin, past physical harm, deliberate threat or prosecution that applicants may have suffered.

After all information has been verified and evaluated, the OFPRA makes a decision and notifies the applicant whether he/she has been granted asylum status or not. If the application is unsuccessful, the applicant has a period of one month to appeal the decisions to the CNDA (National Court of Asylum). Once an appeal has been received by CNDA, the related judgement will have to be made within five months. The final decision from CNDA may support the original decision, however it may also quash the original decision and order a second investigation.

=== Further rights of asylum ===
Other than the legal residency in France, asylum seekers could also apply for the French Citizenship as other immigrants. Usually a five-year of dwelling in France territory would be required before the application, for asylum seekers who get a refugee status, that period could be exempted and they could apply for the naturalization at once if they wish. However, asylum seekers who get a subsidiary status must still obey the normal rule and no exemptions applied.

Support on personal finance and housing would also become available since the asylum seeker starts his or her application procedure. Normally, if the asylum seeker found himself under a specific level which observed by the government, a minimum financial assist equals to €6.80 per day would be given to the asylum seeker at the end of the month (Lump sum). The number of money support could be changed according to different family population of asylum seekers. On housing, asylum seekers could temporarily live in the rooms provided by CADA (Centres for the Reception of Asylum Seekers), which could last for six months before the asylum seeker finished finding his or her own place to live.

== Statistics ==
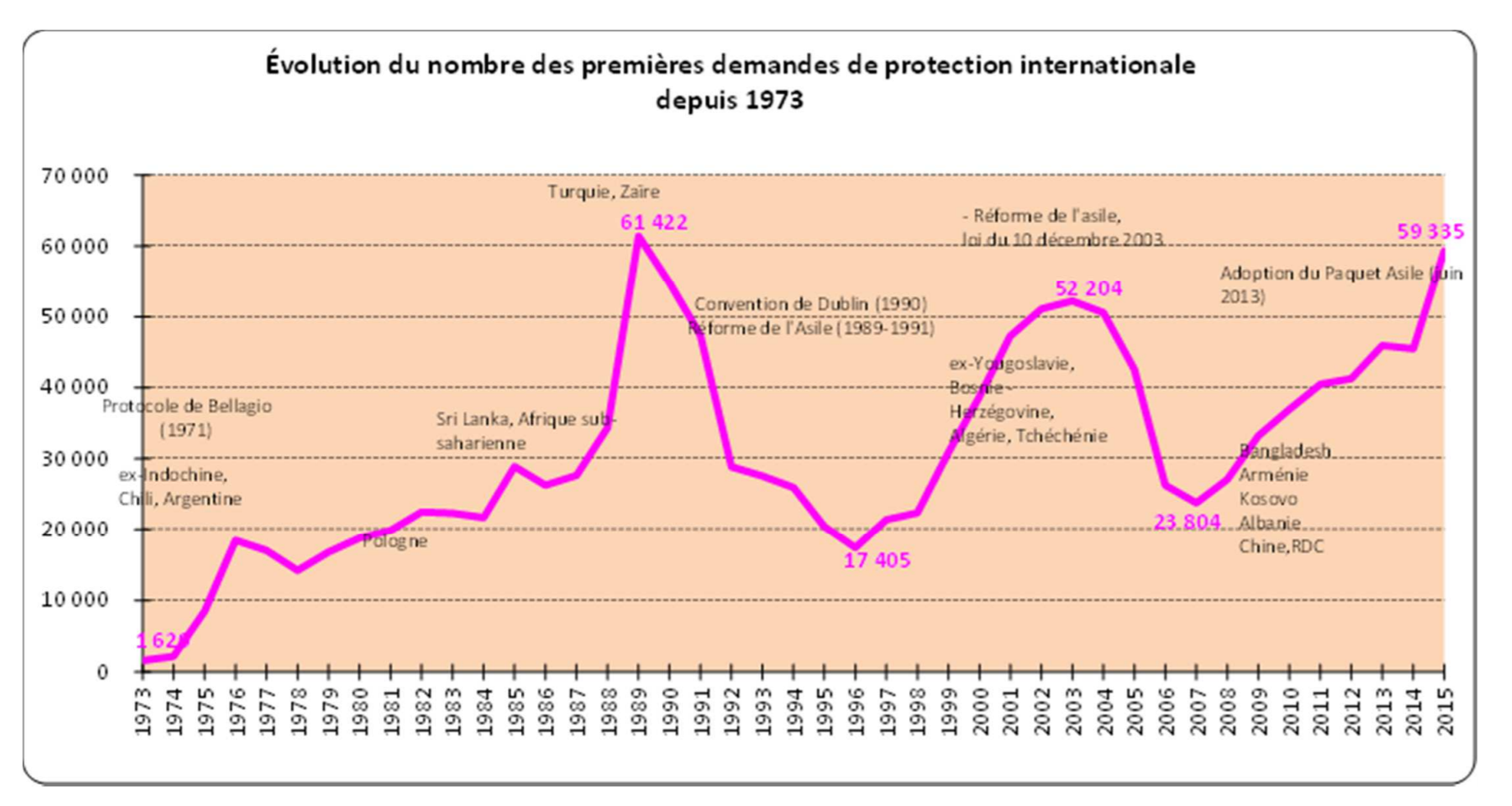
Changes in the number of asylum protections in France since 1973 (OFPRA):

The number of people seeking asylum in France experienced a significant raise after the 1970s. From 1970 to 1995, applications annually for asylum in France increased from nearly 5000 during 1970 to 1974 to 112,200 from 1995 to 1999. In 2010, France received about 48100 asylum applications which makes it one of the top 5 countries receiving the most asylum seekers.

During 2015-2017 due to the European migrant crisis, there was an upward trend of asylum applications numbers in France. Applications for asylum in 2015, 2016 and 2017 reached to 71,000, 85,244, 100,412 respectively. Up to 2018, according to OFPRA's statistics, nearly 122,743 persons have been registered as asylum seekers residing in France. France had also taken part in the resettlement program of UNHCR since 2008, and plans to receive around 10,000 new refugees into French territory.

In 2018, top five origin countries where asylum seekers in France came from are Afghanistan (10,270), Albania (9,690), Georgia (6,960), Guinea (6,880) and Côte d'Ivoire (5,375)

== History ==
=== Before WWII ===
Before the 1930s, French presented a relatively open attitude to refugees for its need of labour and the recovery caused by World War I. but the trend changed as the Great Depression occurred in the 1930s and then France was believed to implement more restrictive policies on immigration and asylum. In early 1933, the Prime Minister Édouard Daladier established an "Intermisterial Commission" focusing on refugee issues. Under the political environment at the moment, refugees in France were connected with national security and issues on employment, also, some voices concerned if refugees could not be assimilated and may cause an integration problem. The trend shortly changed after Daladier left the government in late 1933, and some of the measures were relaxed by the new Prime minister Léon Blum. An examples for the new trend was the interministerial commission's new review of the policy in the same year, which confirmed "no restrictions needed" for refugees coming to France.

In 1938 the policy trend changed again as Édouard Daladier returned to the position of Prime Minister. An examples for the new trend in 1939 was the lukewarm reception to refugees in France during La Retirada, the flight of nearly 500,000 Spaniards due to the defeat of the Republicans in the Spanish Civil War. In the next two years, some of the new decrees were imposed by the government on restricting the amount that heading France for asylum. For example, one of the decrees gave officials at borders a broadening power to reject the entry of asylum seekers. In addition, Jews looking for asylum in France were also believed to be targeted and restricted to an observable extent.

In June 1940, the French army was defeated in the Battle of France. With the influences from Nazi Germany then, new policy on immigration and asylum, which was believed to be more racist, was pursued by the new Vichy government. Many refugees, especially for political asylum purposes, lost their special right to continue residing in France, and some of them were sent back to their origin countries, mostly Germany and Italy. The situation continued until the end of World War II. In November 1945, Charles de Gaulle was elected President of France, and a more consistent policy on immigration and asylum became a goal by the new government.

=== Post-WWII ===
Since 1946, asylum seekers heading for France experienced an increasing trend with the need for recovering the economy. After World War 1 and World War II left France’s economy disheveled, the government allowed migrants and asylum seekers to come in and work as cheap labor. After WWII, France gave up on Keynesian policies and adopted new ones that were heavily focused on innovation and international competitiveness. Asylum-seekers were permitted on the basis of how their labor could benefit the French economy. In 1951, French joined the Convention Relating to the Status of Refugees and formally wrote the right of asylum to its constitution. In July 1952, OFPRA was formally established by a new law, as a professional, independent office for affairs of asylum applications. With the legalization of refugee status, rights of asylum seekers in France could be protected. Data showed that France received about 15,000 asylum seekers annually on average, until 1960. Entering into the 1970s to 1980s, applications for asylum increased at a higher pace and then prompted France to change some of its asylum policies.

Intercultural policies on asylum- seeking were first put in place in the 1980s after being agreed upon by republicans, left and right wing parties as well as anti-immigration and white supremacist groups. This model made undocumented migration highly punishable and pushed to strengthened border control. Only legal migration and asylum seeking could be considered for government assistance.

Major changes on French asylum policy happened in 1990s. In August 1993, new laws on immigration and asylum were passed by French Parliament. The new amendments mainly focused on controlling the number of immigrants and asylum seekers moving into France, regulating marriages and identity documents. Some scholars criticized the changing of laws brought a new trend that would end the liberal-like asylum policy of France, but an announcement by French parliament also stressed that it is reasonable that the entry criteria of asylum seekers and immigrants is within the area that could be changed by administrative measures.

During the Europe Refugee Crisis since 2015, France responded initially and became one of the five EU members that accepted 75% of asylum seekers. Then in September 2015, President François Hollande announced that 24,000 refugees would be finally received by France in the next two years, he then also stressed "Different conditions" that would lead to a lower receiving amount of asylum seekers for France, compared to Germany.

In May 2017 Emmanuel Macron was elected President of France, and some of the new measures were being taken concerning the asylum policy. In July 2017, new facilities founded by France for dealing with asylum applications were set up in Libya, as a way for releasing the pressure occurred with the flow of asylum seekers and immigrants. Then in January 2018, new amendments of the Asylum and Immigration Law (N. 2018-778) were passed by the National Assembly. Some of the core changes are presented below:

1. All asylum seekers arriving France from land borders will not be able to apply for a "jour franc", which is a full 24-hour protection for removal once they are rejected to enter French territory.
1. Lodging time for asylum applications will be reduced to 90 days, compared to 120 days before the new amendment.
2. Applicators would have a new 7-day period to appeal to OFPRA for a transfer decision, which means being received by any member state within the EU area, rather than the prior 15-day period. However, negative decisions including the recognition of inadmissibility may not warrant the asylum seeker the suspensive effect which keeps them residing in France.
3. A mechanism for the distribution of asylum seekers would be established, which regulates the proportion of asylum seekers being lived in each region. Once an asylum seeker has been sent to a region, it is illegal to leave the region without getting authorisation from the French Office of Immigration and Integration. The region distributed to an asylum seeker may also change if the assigned region has no extra capacity to receive more applicators.
4. The entrance to the labour market had been released, asylum seekers who wish to get access to a job would face a 6-month time limit for now, compared to the 9-month limit before the reform.

== Related issues ==
Asylum in France remains a high-profile topic that is being consistently concerned, and some issues regarding to the asylum policy and the current system in France are being claimed to have affected France negatively, and some of the frequently mentioned aspects have been presented below.

=== National security ===
After 2015 the Europe refugee crisis, incidents like terrorist attacks that break national security, are partially connected with the asylum policy. After several terrorist attacks happened in France, for example, the Paris attack in November 2015, after which President Hollande announced the National Emergency status across France. Concerns on domestic security was also presumed to be a reason that pulled up the support rate of right-wing parties since 2015, which advocates stricter policies on managing asylum seekers. Some voices also claimed that the influx of Islamist radicals and the failure of integration policy had contributed to the deteriorating safety environment of France.

=== Camps near Calais ===
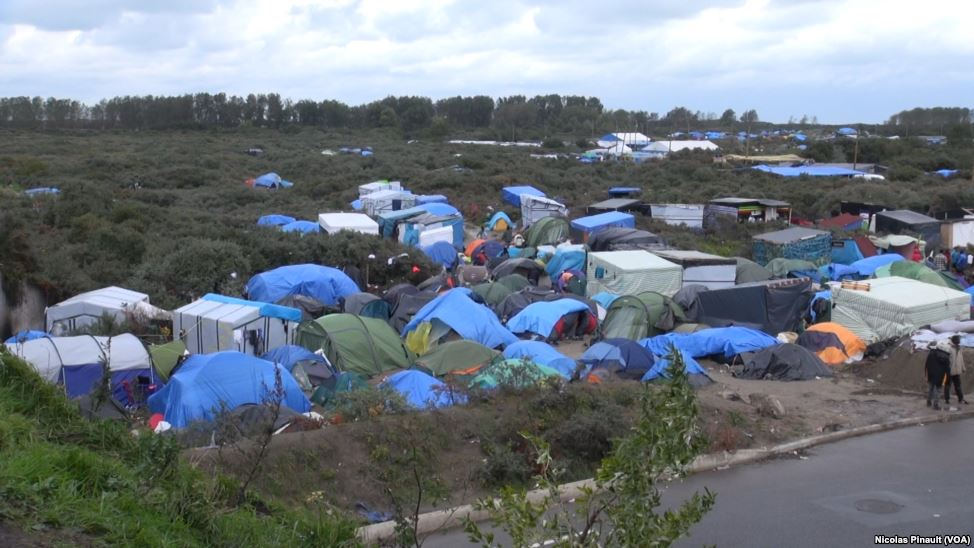
Calais "Jungle" refugee camps in 2015

The living conditions of some asylum seekers in France raised controversies as well. A frequently mentioned case relates to Migrants near Calais and Dunkirk, where refugees built shelters and formed even communities themselves for decades. On the one hand, Living qualities in these temporary camps are described as "dire" by some observers and are criticised as sanitary conditions, medical services and living qualities are reported to be inadequate. However, President Macron also stressed the "illegal actions" that happened by asylum seekers near Calais as they hope to reach the UK and some of the residents had been legally transported to reception centres. Camps near Calais have been announced to be "dismantled" reported in 2015, however, some estimated that 900 asylum seekers are still living near the area.

==== Anti-foreigner sentiment ====
In recent years, France's assimilation policies have marginalized certain groups, as seen with hijabis and other visible Muslims in France. Individuals who fail to assimilate are outcast, leading to difficulties obtaining a job, hardships in education, and obstacles in applying for citizenship. Such social ostracization feeds civil disobedience as seen recently amongst Muslim migrant youth, young adults and hijabis in France.

== See also ==
- Immigration to France
