= Calais Action =

UK refugee aid and advocacy group

Calais Action is a direct-giving refugee aid and advocacy group which is part of the UK grassroots aid movement.

== Background ==
In 2015, the refugee crisis became front-page news across the world. Affected by images of the plight of refugees in camps across Europe, the grassroots aid movement (otherwise known as the people-to-people, or people solidarity movement) consisting of thousands of private individuals with no prior NGO experience began in earnest to self-organise and form groups taking aid to areas of displaced persons.

Calais Action's founder, Libby Freeman, visited Calais in July 2015 with a van of donated items. Upon returning, she founded direct-giving group Calais Action in August 2015. Newspaper coverage and TV interviews inspired a wave of interest from the public. As a result of the press coverage, many people contacted Freeman wanting to help, and so a group of individuals nationwide was created, where aid was collected in local drops and delivered to Calais, Hungary and the Greek Islands.

After the publication of photos of Aylan Kurdi, the drowned child refugee on a Turkish beach in August 2015 in news outlets worldwide, public support and sympathy for refugees peaked, and Calais Action's map of UK-wide aid drops was used in the Guardian to direct concerned readers. Following the huge public response, over 8,000 square feet of aid was collected and sent from the Calais Action warehouse in London to Northern France, Hungary, and the Greek Islands.

== Demolition of Calais Jungle ==
When the Calais Jungle was partially demolished by French authorities in March 2016, it was found that 129 unaccompanied minors in the camp there were unaccounted for.

In October 2016, the remaining Jungle camp was demolished and residents dispersed. Volunteers from Calais Action appeared in TV and radio coverage of the event, correcting essential details and misinformation (such as the idea that all inhabitants had been evacuated before the fire). This footage was also used as part of the documentary Calais Children: A Case to Answer, which was shot during demolitions, covering the plight of minors left stranded by the authorities.

== Campaigning ==
Calais Action campaigns in Parliament to provide more safe and legal routes for refugees, and supported the Dubs Amendment to the Immigration Bill, created by Labour peer Alf Dubs to allow 3,000 unaccompanied child refugees into the UK. The Dubs Amendment was defeated on its first passage through the Commons on 25 April 2016, but a later revision of the Amendment was submitted to the Commons and was passed on 9 May 2016 after both David Cameron and Theresa May conceded in the face of public pressure. However, the Dubs scheme was capped at 480, far short of the 3,000 children that it was intended to benefit.

Currently, Calais Action is part of the House of Lords refugee focus group Action for Humanity, the Refugee Task Force INGO group and the Safe Passage campaign group lobbying for safe and legal routes to asylum such as the Kindertransport Legacy Campaign.

Volunteers have spoken at the UNHCR and ALNAP humanitarian conferences to provide a grassroots perspective to INGOs and aid workers.

Calais Action continues to send aid to Europe and raise awareness of refugees and the necessity for safe and legal routes to asylum.

== Legal ==
Calais Action is a Restricted Fund under the auspices of Prism the Gift Fund, Registered Charity number 1099682.
