= Dawn O'Porter =

British writer, director, and television presenter (born 1979)

- Born: 23 January 1979 (age 47); Alexandria, West Dunbartonshire, Scotland
- Education: Liverpool Institute for Performing Arts
- Occupations: Television presenter, journalist, writer
- Years active: 2005–present
- Television: Dawn... Extreme Wife; My Breasts Could Kill Me; Balls of Steel; This Old Thing
- Spouse: Chris O'Dowd (m. 2012)
- Children: 2

Dawn O'Porter (née Porter; born 23 January 1979) is a British writer, director, and television presenter.

== Early life ==
Dawn O'Porter was born in Alexandria, Scotland, and raised in Guernsey. She studied acting at the Liverpool Institute for Performing Arts. In her third year, she decided that acting was not for her and did work experience on the television series Baddiel and Skinner Unplanned rather than participate in a school production. O'Porter's father is Scottish and lives in Scotland.

== Television & Radio career ==
O'Porter attempted to slim down to a size zero by using drastic dieting regimes for the BBC documentary Super Slim Me. She presented the product-testing section of How to Look Good Naked on Channel 4.

In 2008, O'Porter presented a BBC Three series of four documentary films, Dawn... (14 February–6 March), exploring attitudes to nudity, lesbianism, dating and pregnancy (including childbirth). O'Porter appeared in Seriously Dirty Dancing, a tribute to her favourite film, Dirty Dancing, for Channel 5.

Later that year, she made a four-part series called Extreme Wife for Channel 4. In the first programme, Dawn Porter: Free Lover (2008), O'Porter travelled to San Diego, California, to investigate polyamory, then she travelled to former Germany to visit ZEGG in Belzig, a German free love commune. The programme highlighted the world of free love, such as ritual sensuous oil sessions with naked people covered in warm olive oil, and included discussions with the people who lived in the commune. It premiered with 1.75m viewers (10.7% share). In the second programme, Dawn Porter: Mail Order Bride, O'Porter travelled to Odesa, Ukraine, with a group of American men in their search for a partner. The third programme, Dawn Porter: Geisha Girl, saw O'Porter travel to Kyoto, Japan, and spend a week in a geisha house. In the fourth and final programme, Dawn Porter: Polygamist's Wife, O'Porter investigated women who are prepared to share their husbands with other women. This included a stay in Centennial Park, Arizona, US.

In 2009, O'Porter narrated the BBC Three series Undercover Princes. In 2009 she presented documentary, The Booby Trap, exploring breast cancer, for Sky1. The show aired on 6–7 July 2009, under the title My Breasts Could Kill Me. It premiered with 181,000 viewers (0.9% share).

O'Porter has her own television production company Hot Patootie TV.

In 2011, O'Porter made an appearance in Derren Brown – The Experiments entitled "The Secret of Luck" and later filmed six episodic advertisements for Andrex Washlets. She appeared in E4 drama Skins and has appeared on the television show Balls of Steel.

In 2012, O'Porter organised an Oxfam "get together" alongside friend Gemma Cairney, and raised money for Oxfam by selling clothing previously owned by celebrities.

In 2014, O'Porter hosted and co-produced a series for Channel 4 called This Old Thing exploring vintage clothing. O'Porter hosts Soul Food on Munchies for Vice.

In January 2026, O'Porter preesented a 4-part Friday night series of programmes on Classic FM about classical love themes, and later that year became a regular presenter in the Saturday early afternoon slot from 12noon to 3pm.https://www.classicfm.com/radio/shows-presenters/dawn-oporter/

== Writing ==
O'Porter writes for many publications, on feminism and aspects of women's lifestyle.

In 2006 she published Diaries of an Internet Lover. In May 2013 she released her first novel, Paper Aeroplanes, the fictional tale of an intense female friendship loosely inspired by her own childhood in Guernsey.

Her publication, The Cows, was released in 2016 and has since been featured on the Sunday Times Best Sellers list. In 2019, HarperCollins published her novel, So Lucky. In 2022 HarperCollins published another of her novels, Cat Lady. In 2024, HarperCollins Canada published HoneyBee. In June 2026, HarperCollins published in hardback, Hungry Eyes: A Memoir of Appetite, Ambition and the Odd Bag of Wotsits for Dinner.

== Personal life ==
In 2012, Porter married Chris O'Dowd and changed her name to Dawn O'Porter.

In 2015, O'Porter gave birth to a son. In 2017, O'Porter gave birth to a second son.

O'Porter was one of the founding members of the charity Help Refugees (now called Choose Love).
