= Choose Love (organisation) =

Non-governmental organisation based in United Kingdom

- Founded: 2015; 11 years ago
- Founders: Lliana Bird, Josie Naughton, Dawn O'Porter, Dani Lawrence
- Location(s): Head office: London, WC2R; United Kingdom
- Origins: London/Calais
- Region served: Europe and the Middle East
- Website: chooselove.org
- Formerly called: Help Refugees

Choose Love (formerly Help Refugees) is a UK-based non-governmental organisation (NGO) which provides humanitarian aid to, and advocacy for, refugees around the world. In 2016, it became the largest grassroots distributor of aid in Europe.

== History ==
=== Early days ===
Help Refugees grew "accidentally" out of a social media campaign organised by radio presenter and writer Lliana Bird, TV presenter and writer Dawn O'Porter, and artist management assistant Josie Naughton to help one of Bird's friends collect donations and funds to support refugees in the so-called Jungle camp in Calais.

In August 2015, Bird and Naughton offered to help Bird's former acting teacher, Tom Radcliffe, who was aiming to raise £1,000 and a van-load of donations to drive from the UK to Calais. The two women met with O'Porter and decided to use the hashtag #HelpCalais to raise awareness of the crisis and to help raise funds. They used their social media followings and celebrity contacts to spread the word and were overwhelmed with the response: within days the group had raised enough material donations to warrant finding a storage space, which was donated by Big Yellow Group. Dani Lawrence, who runs an import company with her husband and whose father was a Moroccan refugee, offered to help coordinate getting the donations to Calais. A week after the campaign started, the image of two-year-old Syrian Alan Kurdi was in the news and donations increased exponentially as people became more aware of the so-called European migrant crisis. Bird's sister, who was volunteering from Tel Aviv as supply manager and had set up an Amazon wish list of items needed in the camp in Calais, recounts, "I keep putting on 100 pairs of boots, 200 sleeping bags, 300 tents, and they keep disappearing" – initially, she thought there was a glitch with the wish list, but "realised that they were disappearing because people were buying them". The Big Yellow Group contacted the campaign organisers to inform them that 7,000 packages had arrived in a day. With only six volunteers sorting the donations, the women made an appeal on social media for more; the organisers fed those who turned up by again asking for support, to which Domino's Pizza and Nando's responded. The group now had 15 storage rooms.

Bird, Lawrence, Naughton, and O'Porter visited Calais to work out how they could get the donations to the right place to help people there, expecting to find large NGOs like the Red Cross or the UNHCR. No large NGOs were there, but their encounters with people living in the camp and individuals dedicated to supporting those people (like Liz Clegg, a former firefighter from Glastonbury who was organising food and aid and would later establish a women's and children's centre) encouraged them to work with individuals already there to find a solution.

Returning to Calais on 15 September, the women hired a warehouse in which to store donations. In a DIY store while looking for shelving for the warehouse, Lawrence met a stranger from Ireland who had raised £5,000 to be used in Calais buy didn't know what to do with it: they offered to pay for the shelving, which came to £900. As more volunteers arrived to help, Help Refugees began efforts to build temporary shelters at the camp, distribute goods and provide other services that were not being catered for sufficiently, working with local associations where possible. The group were involved in receiving, sorting and distribution of donations, shelter construction, and camp census taking. Friends of the founding women moved to France to help, organising volunteers and shelter allocations for refugees, for example. The number of donations and volunteers increased and a larger warehouse was found.

Bird, Lawrence, Naughton, and O'Porter were mostly working from Lawrence's home in London, fitting things around their jobs. Lawrence had effectively given up working on her business and Bird dialled back her media work to focus on the charity. By January 2016, Naughton quit her job with Coldplay to focus on Help Refugees. Lawrence describes them as "the accidental charity". Naughton and Bird ran Help Refugees together from 2015 to 2018. Bird left Choose Love in 2018. Today, Naughton is CEO and Lawrence remains a director.

=== Expansion out of France ===
In October 2015, there was an increase in migrant arrivals in the Moria Refugee Camp in Lesbos, Greece, and disease was breaking out. Help Refugees put out a message asking for doctors to go there and offering to pay for flights and accommodation if they could stay for more than a week. They managed to fund 30 doctors. By June 2016, Help Refugees was supporting 26 projects across Europe.

Since 2015, Choose Love has raised more than £120 million and worked in 50 countries across the world.

=== Prism the Gift Fund ===
Choose Love initially operated as a "collective fund" managed by Prism the Gift Fund. The company was established in 2004 to increase the flow of funds from British donors into the charity sector. Prism the Gift Fund helped Choose Love with legal and financial issues and "back-office support". Corporate Watch raised concerns over the lack of transparency around the partnership between the two companies, especially around their decision to leave Northern France in 2021. Starting from May 2024, Choose Love has become an independent charity, severing its ties with Prism the Gift Fund.

=== Name change ===
Choose Love's previous logo, when the organisation was called Help Refugees

In January 2021 the organisation changed its name from Help Refugees to Choose Love, saying the former had served the organisation well but that the new one better reflected what the organisation aspired to be: "We want a world of love, welcome and justice – not just charity". The organisation had already been operating in the United States as Choose Love.

=== Quitting Calais and Dunkirk ===
In November 2021 Choose Love announced on instagram it would stop funding to all organisations, apart from ECPAT International and Safe Passage UK, in Calais and Dunkirk by the end of the year.

The decision to leave Northern France led to criticism of celebrity philanthropy. In December 2020 Corporate Watch published an investigation into the reasons for Choose Love's decision based on interviews with former employees at Choose Love. The report suggested the charity pulled out of its support of organisations in Calais because those organisations were requesting accountability from Choose love and criticised the charity for potentially capitulating to political pressure from the British Government, concluding that "If standing with refugees means choosing love, that love also requires commitment."

== Controversies ==
In May 2020 Choose Love contacted partner associations in Calais warning them that distributing or discussing "Safety at Sea" leaflets could be "regarded as criminal offences". Choose Love then told partner organisations to sign a "Memorandum of Understanding" promising not to "carry out activities which risk breaching the law." Watch the Channel disputed the position; Choose Love replied: "We are unable to fund organisations distributing leaflets of this nature." Writing in the University of Oxford's Faculty of Law blog Border Criminologies, four academics described Choose Love as 'volunteer[ing] itself to act as the UK's border police' because the charity had, without legal precedent, decided to "define certain forms of support as (potentially) criminal".

In December 2021, The Times published an article containing allegations of workplace bullying at the charity and the mishandling of a rape allegation from a Choose Love employee by the charity's leadership.

In December 2022, an open letter from 12 ex-Choose Love employees alleged that the charity's leadership had presided over a "toxic work culture" in which staff and volunteers felt "disposable" and that the heads of the charity's "relentless drive for growth and expansion" came at the expense of the well-being of staff and service users.

== Media coverage ==
The Guardian chose Help Refugees as one of the partner charities for their 2016 Charity Appeal.

Help Refugees' census of the Calais refugee camp received media coverage across the globe.

A BBC documentary This World: Calais, The End of the Jungle featured interviews with several Help Refugees staff and volunteers.

== Celebrity endorsements ==
Celebrities who have endorsed, advocated, partnered and performed for Help Refugees and their fundraising events include Phoebe Waller-Bridge, Jude Law, Tom Odell, Nicola Coughlan and Pamela Anderson.

== Collaborations ==
In June 2017, Help Refugees partnered with London's V&A for Help Refugees: Our Shared Future, a series of discussions in their Lecture Theatre to launch the 2017 Refugee Week.

== Choose Love and retail ==
At a fundraiser in November 2015, Help Refugees launched "Choose Love" T-shirts, created by British designer Katharine Hamnett. Profits from the T-shirts – which were sold by UK online retailer ASOS – are donated to Help Refugees. In 2017, Help Refugees launched series of Choose Love music event fundraisers which has included club nights hosted by electronic music website Resident Advisor.

In November 2017, and each November since, they launched a Choose Love pop-up shop in Soho, London, and an accompanying website, where people could purchase essential items for refugees in the guise of Christmas presents. In the run-up to Christmas 2018, a second Choose Love store opened in New York City, while an art work donated by Banksy was on display and available to be won in the London shop.
