= Natacha Bouchart =

French politician (born 1963)

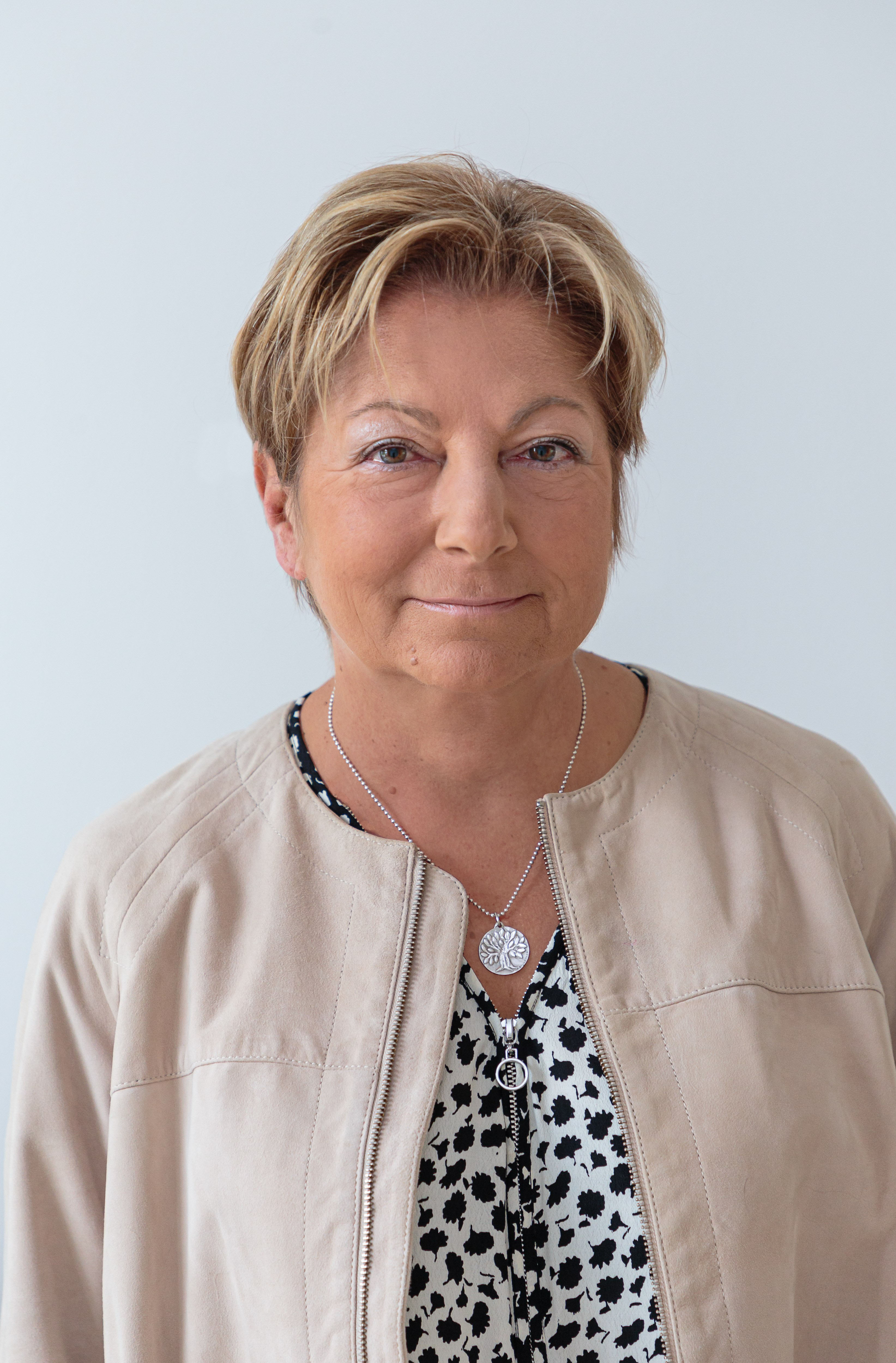
- Natacha Bouchart in 2020

Mayor of Calais
- Incumbent
- Assumed office 22 March 2008
- Preceded by: Jacky Hénin

Member of the Regional Council of Hauts-de-France
- Incumbent
- Assumed office 1 January 2016
- President: Xavier Bertrand

Member of the French Senate for Pas-de-Calais
- In office 1 October 2011 – 12 January 2016
- Succeeded by: Jean-François Rapin

Personal details
- Born: Natacha Keuroglanian; 29 May 1963 (age 62) Lens, France
- Party: Miscellaneous right (since 2022); The Republicans (2015-2022)

Calais coat of arms

Natacha Bouchart (born 29 May 1963) is a French politician of the Republicans (LR) and formerly Union for a Popular Movement (UMP).

== Life and career ==
Bouchart was born at Lens. She has served as Mayor of Calais since 2008 and was elected to represent Pas-de-Calais in the French Senate in 2011.

Ahead of the Republicans' 2016 presidential primary, Bouchart endorsed Nicolas Sarkozy as the party's candidate for the 2017 French presidential election.

Ahead of the 2022 presidential elections, Bouchart publicly declared her support for incumbent Emmanuel Macron and criticized the Republicans’ candidate Valérie Pécresse.
