= Pale of Calais =

Exclave controlled by England during the Middle Ages

Coordinates: 50°56′53″N 1°51′23″E

- 1347–1558
- Flag Royal coat of arms
- Motto: Veritas Temporis filia "Truth, the daughter of Time"
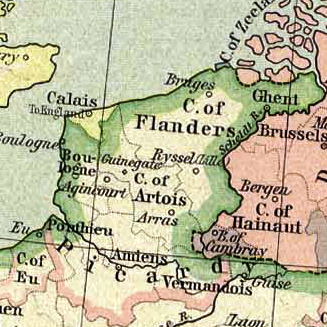
- The Pale of Calais (yellow) in 1477.
- Status: Exclave of England
- Capital: Calais
- Common languages: English, Dutch, and French
- Religion: Official: Catholic (until 1534); (from 1553); Church of England (1534–1553); Others: Judaism
- Lord
  - 1347–1377: Edward III (first)
  - 1553–1558: Mary I (last)
- Governor
  - 1353: Reynold Cobham (first)
  - 1553–1558: Thomas Wentworth (last)
- Historical era: Late Middle Ages
  - Siege of Calais: 3 August 1347
  - Treaty of Brétigny: 8 May 1360
  - Siege of Calais: 8 January 1558
  - Peace of Vervins: 2 May 1598
- Currency: Sterling
| Preceded by | Succeeded by |
| County of Boulogne | Kingdom of France |
- Today part of: France

The Pale of Calais (Note: Early Modern English, Cales /ˈkæləs/; West Flemish: Kales; French: Calaisis) was an exclave and parliamentary borough of England across the Strait of Dover from 1347 to 1558. The land enclosing Calais was taken following the Battle of Crécy in 1346 and the subsequent Siege of Calais, and was confirmed at the Treaty of Brétigny in 1360, in the reign of Edward III of England. It became an important market for English wool, an industrial hub for Europe's textile trade centred in Flanders, and the English gateway to continental Europe.

The Pale also defended England as the outermost, permanently fortified stronghold at the narrowest point between Britain and the rest of Europe. Its proximity allowed England to garrison, reinforce and supply it quickly across the Channel. The exclave was bilingual with English and Flemish commonly spoken. It was represented in Parliament by the Calais constituency and participated in the English Reformation.

During the reign of Mary I of England (who was also Queen consort of Spain), the Pale was retaken by the French following a siege in 1558, in the County of Flanders. Subsequently, the English textile trade abandoned Calais and moved to the Habsburg Netherlands.

== Toponym ==
The term pale refers to a "jurisdiction, area". English "Cales" (now supplanted by French Calais) derives from Caletes, an ancient Celtic people who lived along the coast of the English Channel.

== Geography ==
The Pale of Calais c. 1360

The area of the Pale of Calais is difficult to delineate because boundaries frequently changed and often included ill-defined marsh and waterways. Over those wetlands, the territory was roughly divided in low hills on the west and the lower coastlands to the east. The Pale roughly encompassed the land between Gravelines and Wissant, which was about 20 square miles (52 km^{2}). Throughout its history, the French were continually retaking small pieces of the territory, particularly land in the southwest.

The Pale of Calais is roughly within the modern French communes of Andres, Ardres, Balinghem, Bonningues-lès-Calais, Calais, Campagne-lès-Guines, Coquelles, Coulogne, Fréthun, Guemps, Guînes, Les Attaques, Hames-Boucres, Hervelinghen, Marck, Nielles-lès-Calais, Nouvelle-Église, Offekerque, Oye-Plage, Peuplingues, Pihen-lès-Guînes, Sangatte, Saint-Pierre, Saint-Tricat, and Vieille-Église.

== History ==
Calais was a prize of war won in the Battle of Crécy of 1346 by Edward III of England after a long siege. Its capture gave England not only a key stronghold in Europe's textile trade centred in Flanders, but provided a strategic, defensible military outpost for England to regroup in future wars on the continent; the city's position on the English Channel could be reinforced over the short distance by sea. English sovereignty was confirmed under the Treaty of Brétigny, signed on 8 May 1360, when Edward renounced the throne of France in return for substantial lands, namely Aquitaine and the territory around Calais. By 1453, at the end of the Hundred Years' War, the Pale was the last part of mainland France in English hands. It served successfully as a base for English expeditions such as the Siege of Boulogne, launched by Henry VII in 1492.

The short trip across the Strait of Dover afforded convenient garrison and supply by sea. However, the lack of natural inland defences necessitated the construction and maintenance of military fortifications, at some expense. A critical factor in the stability of English government there over the centuries was the rivalry of France and Burgundy, both of which coveted the strategic position of the city; each left it to the English rather than to concede it to each other. Eventually, political strategies shifted at the division of Burgundian territory in the Low Countries between France and Spain and, when Henry VIII suffered setbacks in the Sieges of Boulogne, the approach to Calais opened to the south. Then in 1550, the Crown, in a crisis of royal succession, withdrew from Boulogne.

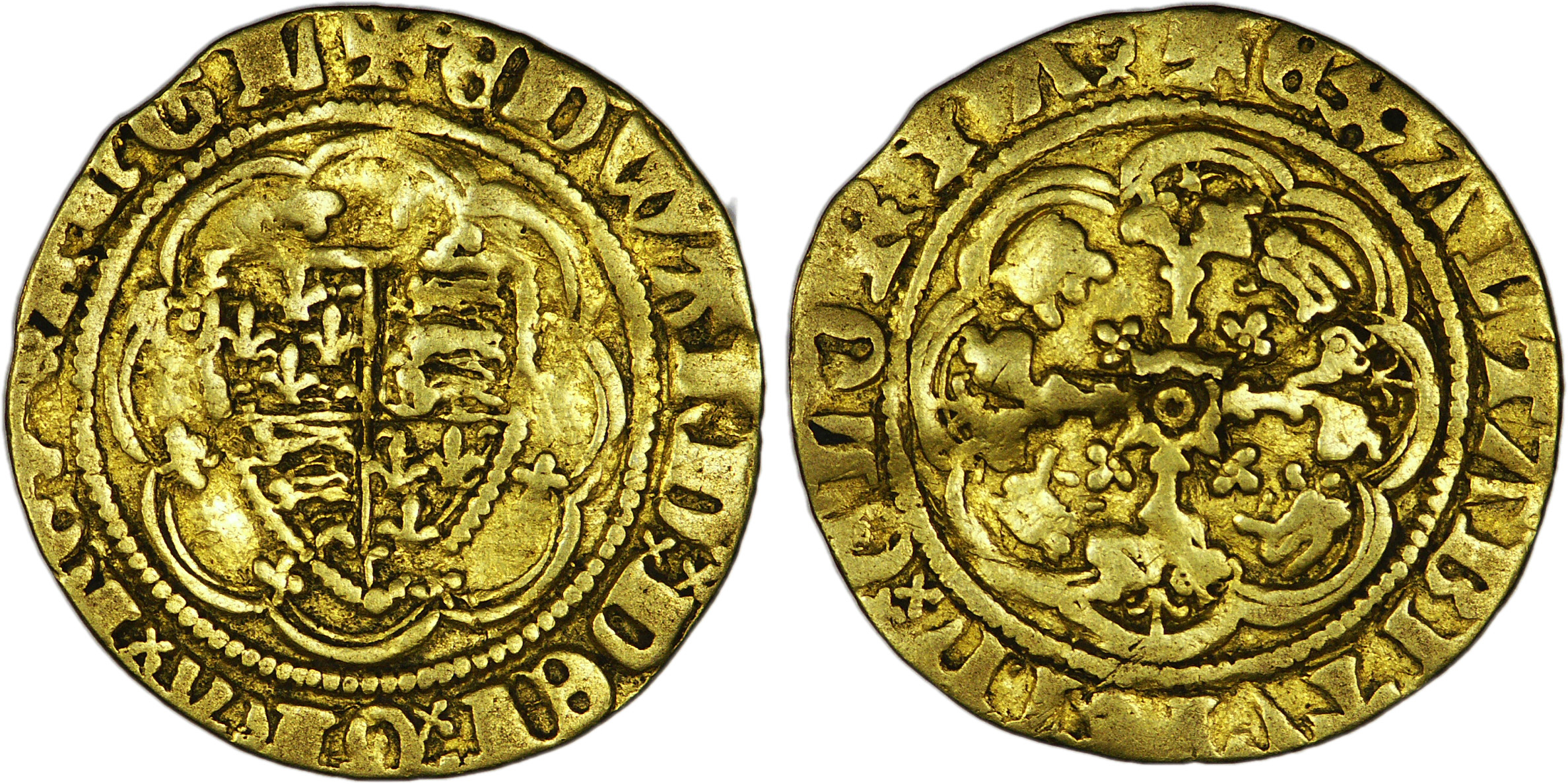
Gold quarter noble of Edward III minted in Calais between 1361 and 1369

The Pale of Calais remained part of England until it was besieged and captured by France in 1558. After secret preparations, 30,000 French troops, led by Francis, Duke of Guise, took the city, which capitulated under the Treaty of Cateau-Cambrésis (1559). In England, blame was attached to the Queen, entrenching Protestant resolve against her. Although the loss of the Pale of Calais was a lesser blow to the English economy than was feared, the retreat of English power was a permanent blot to her reign. Indeed, the chronicler Raphael Holinshead records that a few months later a distraught Mary, lying on her death bed, graphically confided to her family her feelings: "When I am dead and opened, you shall find 'Calais' lying in my heart". Subsequently, the English wool market adjusted and the English textile trade moved to the Habsburg Netherlands.

During English governance, the weavers of the Pale maintained their output, which industry was a distinctive mark of Flemish culture. At the same time, the Pale performed as an integral part of England in election of its members to Parliament, and as English citizens the Pale sent and received people to and from various parts of the British Isles.

== Artistic interpretations ==
The hardships endured during the prolonged siege of 1346–1347 are the subject of Auguste Rodin's poignant sculpture of 1889, The Burghers of Calais.

== See also ==
- English claims to the French throne
- History of Calais
- List of captains, lieutenants and lords deputies of English Calais
- The Pale (Ireland)
- Calais Staple
- Treasurer of Calais
- Calais (Parliament of England constituency)
