= Canton of Calais-Nord-Ouest =

Coordinates: 50°55′07″N 1°47′37″E

Calais-Nord-Ouest
- Former canton
- Interactive map of Calais-Nord-Ouest
- Country: France
- Region: Hauts-de-France
- Department: Pas-de-Calais
- No. of communes: {{{nbcomm}}}
- Disbanded: 2015
- Population (2012): 28,468

The canton of Calais-Nord-Ouest is a former canton situated in the department of the Pas-de-Calais and in the Nord-Pas-de-Calais region of northern France. It was disbanded following the French canton reorganisation which came into effect in March 2015. It consisted of 9 communes, which joined the canton of Calais-1 in 2015. It had a total of 28,468 inhabitants (2012).

== Geography ==
The canton is organised around Calais in the arrondissement of Calais. The altitude varies from 0m (Calais) to 154m (Escalles) for an average altitude of 27m.

The canton comprised 9 communes:

- Bonningues-lès-Calais
- Calais (partly)
- Coquelles
- Escalles
- Fréthun
- Nielles-lès-Calais
- Peuplingues
- Saint-Tricat
- Sangatte

== See also ==
- Cantons of Pas-de-Calais
- Communes of Pas-de-Calais
- Arrondissements of the Pas-de-Calais department
