= Catherine Fournier (French politician) =

French politician (1955–2021)

Member of the Senate of France
- In office 2 October 2017 – 7 December 2021
- Constituency: Pas-de-Calais

Member of the Regional Council of Hauts-de-France
- In office 4 January 2016 – 7 December 2021

Mayor of Fréthun
- In office 1995–2017
- Succeeded by: Guy Heddebaux

General Councilor of the Canton of Calais-Nord-Ouest
- In office November 2006 – September 2008
- Preceded by: André Ségard
- Succeeded by: Michel Hamy

Personal details
- Born: 16 September 1955 Boulogne-sur-Mer, France
- Died: 7 December 2021 (aged 66)
- Party: UDI

Catherine Fournier (French pronunciation: [katʁin fuʁnje]; 16 September 1955 – 7 December 2021) was a French politician.

== Biography ==
Fournier began serving as mayor of Fréthun in 1995. She served as General Councilor of the Canton of Calais-Nord-Ouest from 2006 to 2008. She was then elected to the Regional Council of Hauts-de-France in 2016. She also served as Vice-President of the Communauté de communes du sud-ouest du Calaisis, as well as of Grand Calais Terres et Mers.

On 24 September 2017, Fournier was elected to the Senate. Therefore, she was forced to resign as mayor of Fréthun and was succeeded by Guy Heddebaux. As a senator, she invited yellow vest protestor Éric Drouet to the Senate to discuss the privatization of Groupe ADP and Française des Jeux. However, the meeting was cancelled.

Catherine Fournier died on 7 December 2021, at the age of 66.
