= Château de Sangatte =

Former castle in Pas-de-Calais, France

Château de Sangatte was a castle in Sangatte, Pas-de-Calais, France.

== History ==
Baldwin II, Count of Guînes began construction of a castle at Sangatte in 1190 on top of an ancient fort, consisting of a courtyard, surrounded by towers with a keep. In 1214, the castle was slighted by Ferdinand, Count of Flanders.

The castle fell to the English in 1349 and became the western outpost of the English held Pale of Calais.

Philip the Good, Duke of Burgundy captured Sangatte in 1436 with a force of Flemish militia and sacked the castle. The castle was destroyed by Francis, Duke of Guise in 1558.
