= List of shipwrecks in April 1868 =

The list of shipwrecks in April 1868 includes ships sunk, foundered, wrecked, grounded, or otherwise lost during April 1868.

== 1 April ==
List of shipwrecks: 1 April 1868
| Ship | State | Description |
|---|---|---|
| Balmoral | United Kingdom | The ship was driven ashore at Sutton-on-Sea, Lincolnshire. She was on a voyage from Ghent, East Flanders, Belgium to Grimsby, Lincolnshire. She was refloated. |
| Leslie Alexander | United Kingdom | The barque collided with the full-rigged ship Réunion (United States) and sank off Start Point, Devon. Her crew were rescued by Réunion. Leslie Alexander was on a voyage from Swansea, Glamorgan to Havre de Grâce, Seine-Inférieure, France. |
| Triwave | United Kingdom | The ship departed from Rangoon, Burma for Falmouth, Cornwall. No further trace, presumed foundered with the loss of all twenty crew. |

== 3 April ==
List of shipwrecks: 3 April 1868
| Ship | State | Description |
|---|---|---|
| Margaret | United Kingdom | The lighter sank at Greenock, Renfrewshire. |
| Margaret | United Kingdom | The brig was driven ashore on Skagen, Denmark. She was on a voyage from Burntisland, Fife to Copenhagen, Denmark. She was refloated. |

== 4 April ==
List of shipwrecks: 4 April 1868
| Ship | State | Description |
|---|---|---|
| Falcon | United Kingdom | The barque ran aground at New York, United States. She was on a voyage from New York to Shanghai, China. She was refloated and resumed her voyage, but abandoned it off Sandy Hook, New Jersey. Falcon was towed back to New York in a leaky condition. |

== 5 April ==
List of shipwrecks: 5 April 1868
| Ship | State | Description |
|---|---|---|
| Cleopatra | (United Kingdom of Great Britain and Ireland) New Zealand | The steamship was wrecked in Palliser Bay. All on board survived. She was on a voyage from Napier to Wellington. |

== 6 April ==
List of shipwrecks: 6 April 1868
| Ship | State | Description |
|---|---|---|
| Autocrat | United States | The ship was driven ashore and wrecked at San Francisco, California. She was on a voyage from Baltimore, Maryland to San Francisco |
| Cleopatra | (United Kingdom of Great Britain and Ireland) New Zealand | The paddle steamer was wrecked to the west of Cape Palliser during a storm. |
| Daphne | United Kingdom | The brig was driven ashore at Hartlepool, County Durham. She was refloated. |
| Fortune | United Kingdom | The brig ran aground at Hartlepool. She was on a voyage from Christiania, Norway to Hartlepool. She was refloated with the assistance of a number of tugs and taken in to Hartlepool. |
| Henrietta Nathan | Flag unknown | The barque, with a crew of seven, departd from Lyttelton, New Zealand, for Tasmania and was not sighted again. The general belief was that she foundered in a gale off the Tasmania coast in late April. |
| Nagpore | United Kingdom | The ship ran aground in the Hooghly River. She was on a voyage from Liverpool, Lancashire to Calcutta, India. She was refloated. |
| Rhine | United Kingdom | The ship ran aground and was wrecked on the Goodwin Sands, Kent. Her crew were rescued. She was on a voyage from London to Quebec City, Canada. |
| Wingate Grange | United Kingdom | The brig ran ashore at Hartlepool. She was refloated with the assistance of some tugs. |

== 7 April ==
List of shipwrecks: 7 April 1868
| Ship | State | Description |
|---|---|---|
| Adelaide King | United Kingdom | The schooner ran aground on the Goodwin Sands, Kent. She was refloated and resumed her voyage. |
| Estefana | United Kingdom | The brig was driven ashore and wrecked near Provincetown, Massachusetts, United States. She was on a voyage from Matanzas, Cuba to Boston, Massachusetts. |
| Jeune Arthur | France | The ship collided with an American barque and sank off the South Foreland, Kent. Her crew were rescued by HMRC Adder ( Board of Customs). Jeune Arthur was on a voyage from Dunkirk, Nord to Lorient, Morbihan. |
| Nyssious | Sweden | The galiot foundered with the loss of her captain. Survivors were rescued by the barque Hercolous (Prussia). Nyssious was on a voyage from Gothenburg to West Hartlepool, County Durham, United Kingdom. |
| Richard III | United Kingdom | The ship was driven ashore on Sullivan's Island, South Carolina, United States. She was on a voyage from Liverpool, Lancashire to Charleston, South Carolina. She was refloated on 12 April. |
| Sarah | United Kingdom | The schooner sprang a leak and was beached at Harwich, Essex. She was on a voyage from Ipswich, Suffolk to Grangemouth, Stirlingshire. She was later refloated and put back to Ipswich. |
| Superb | United Kingdom | The barque was run into by the brig Amphitrite (United Kingdom) and was severely damaged at South Shields, County Durham. |

== 8 April ==
List of shipwrecks: 8 April 1868
| Ship | State | Description |
|---|---|---|
| Americana | United Kingdom | The ship caught fire at New Orleans, Louisiana, United States. |
| Eleanor | United Kingdom | The ship was wrecked at Llandudno, Caernarfonshire. |
| Melona | United Kingdom | The schooner was run into by the steamship Barrington and was severely damaged at Sunderland, County Durham. |
| Northumberland | United Kingdom | The brig was driven ashore at Ryhope, County Durham and sank. Her seven crew survived. She was on a voyage from London to Sunderland. |
| Norway | United Kingdom | The barque ran aground on the Middelgrunden, in the Baltic Sea. She was on a voyage from Sunderland to Swinemünde, Prussia. |
| Robert | Sweden | The ship ran aground on Scroby Sands, Norfolk, United Kingdom. She was on a voyage from Gothenburg to Ipswich, Suffolk, United Kingdom. She was refloated and taken in to Great Yarmouth, Norfolk. |
| Vera | United Kingdom | The brig was driven ashore and wrecked on South Landing Beach, Flamborough Head, Yorkshire in a gale. She was on a ballast voyage from King's Lynn, Norfolk to Seaham, County Durham. |
| Vision | United Kingdom | The fishing boat foundered in the North Sea. Her crew were rescued by the brig Jumna (United Kingdom). |
| Wingate Grange | United Kingdom | The brig was driven ashore at Hartlepool, County Durham. |

== 9 April ==
List of shipwrecks: 9 April 1868
| Ship | State | Description |
|---|---|---|
| Agenoria | United Kingdom | The brigantine was driven ashore and wrecked at Cromer, Norfolk. Her five crew were rescued by the Cromer Lifeboat. She was on a voyage from Lowestoft, Suffolk to Seaham, County Durham. |
| Brilliant | United Kingdom | The ship ran aground on the Westby Knock Sand, in the North Sea off the coast of Norfolk. She was on a voyage from Rochester, Kent to Goole, Yorkshire. She was refloated and taken in to King's Lynn, Norfolk in a severely leaky condition. |
| Derwent | United Kingdom | The ship was driven ashore at Brodick, Isle of Arran, Inner Hebrides. Her crew survived. She was on a voyage from Belfast, County Antrim to Ayr. |
| Jeanne Marie | United Kingdom | The ship was driven ashore on Skagen, Denmark. She was on a voyage from Leith, Lothian to Flensburg, Prussia. She had become a wreck by 17 April. |
| Ottawa | United Kingdom | The ship was abandoned off Cuttyhunk Island, Massachusetts, United States. Her crew survived. She was on a voyage from Cienfuegos, Cuba to Portland, Maine, United States. She was towed in to New Bedford, Massachusetts. |
| Seagull | United States | The steamship was destroyed by fire off Waukegan, Illinois with the loss of about 100 lives. There were two survivors. She was on a voyage from Milwaukee, Wisconsin to Chicago, Illinois. |
| Volo | France | The ship collided with HMS Minotaur (Royal Navy) and was severely damaged. She was on a voyage from Newport, Monmouthshire, United Kingdom to "Jellah Coffee", Dahomey. She put back to Newport. |

== 10 April ==
List of shipwrecks: 10 April 1868
| Ship | State | Description |
|---|---|---|
| Alagundat | Prussia | The ship was driven ashore on the coast of Denmark. She was on a voyage from Newcastle upon Tyne, Northumberland, United Kingdom to Danzig. she was refloated and taken in to Rønne, Denmark. |
| British Isles | United Kingdom | The ship was destroyed by fire off Beachy Head, Sussex. Her crew survived. She was on a voyage from Cartagena, Spain to South Shields, County Durham. |
| Flora | United Kingdom | The brig was driven ashore in the Rockaway Inlet. She was on a voyage from Buenos Aires, Argentina to New York, United States. She was refloated and completed her voyage. |
| George Henry | United Kingdom | The barque ran aground on the Joe Flogger Reef. She as on a voyage from Sagua La Grande, Cuba to Philadelphia, Pennsylvania, United States. |
| Movette | United Kingdom | The ship departed from Newport, Monmouthshire for "Jellah Coffee", Dahomey. No further trace, presumed foundered with the loss of all hands. |
| Reddies | United Kingdom | The schooner was driven ashore on Bornholm, Denmark. She was on a voyage from Königsberg, Prussia to Newcastle upon Tyne. She was refloated and resumed her voyage. |
| Saint Fillan | United Kingdom | The ship ran aground on the Oyster Bank. She was on a voyage from Maryport, Cumberland to Belfast, County Antrim. She was refloated and resumed her voyage, but was run into by the steamship Camel (United Kingdom) and sank off Holywood, County Down. |

== 11 April ==
List of shipwrecks: 11 April 1868
| Ship | State | Description |
|---|---|---|
| Gleaner | United Kingdom | The ship departed from Cardiff, Glamorgan for Constantinople, Ottoman Empire. No further trace, presumed foundered with the loss of all hands. |
| Freire Primero | Portugal | The schooner collided with the barque Iniziatore (Italy) and sank in the Mediterranean Sea 12 nautical miles (22 km) east of Málaga, Spain. Her crew were rescued by Iniziatore. Frire Primero was on a voyage from Oran, Algeria to Málaga. |
| Sir James | United Kingdom | The ship was abandoned. She was on a voyage from Hartlepool, County Durham to Madras, India. She was towed in the Falmouth, Cornwall. |

== 12 April ==
List of shipwrecks: 12 April 1868
| Ship | State | Description |
|---|---|---|
| Breeze | United Kingdom | The ship departed from Liverpool, Lancashire for Bay Roberts, Newfoundland Colony. No further trace, presumed foundered with the loss of all hands. |
| Naryana | Sweden | The ship ran aground on the Nidingen Reef, in the Baltic Sea and was damaged. She was on a voyage from Newcastle upon Tyne, Northumberland, United Kingdom to Stockholm. She was later refloated and taken in to Gothenburg for repairs. |

== 13 April ==
List of shipwrecks: 13 April 1868
| Ship | State | Description |
|---|---|---|
| Mary Shepherd | United Kingdom | The ship caught fire at Madras, India. |
| Talmyra | United Kingdom | The steamship was driven ashore at Kertch, Russia. |

== 14 April ==
List of shipwrecks: 14 April 1868
| Ship | State | Description |
|---|---|---|
| Jane | United Kingdom | The barque was abandoned at sea with the loss of five of her crew. Survivors were rescued by Swanley (United Kingdom). |
| Trojan | United Kingdom | The steamship ran aground in the Clyde. She was on a voyage from Alexandria, Egypt to Glasgow, Renfrewshire. She was refloated the next day and completed her voyage. |

== 15 April ==
List of shipwrecks: 15 April 1868
| Ship | State | Description |
|---|---|---|
| Diana | United Kingdom | The ship departed from Liverpool, Lancashire for Harbour Grace, Newfoundland Colony. No further trace, presumed foundered with the loss of all hands. |
| Enterprise | (United Kingdom of Great Britain and Ireland) Falkland Islands | The ship ran aground and sank in the Rio Negro. |
| Europe | United Kingdom | The brig was run into by the barque Towy (United Kingdom) and sank with the loss of one of her seven crew. Survivors were rescued by Towy. Europe was on a voyage from Garston, Lancashire to Seville, Spain. |

== 18 April ==
List of shipwrecks: 18 April 1868
| Ship | State | Description |
|---|---|---|
| Brilliant | United Kingdom | The barque was abandoned in the Atlantic Ocean. Her crew were rescued by Liberty (United Kingdom). Brilliant was on a voyage from Dundee, Forfarshire to Quebec City, Canada. |
| Flying Cloud, and Lady Brisbane | United Kingdom | The paddle tug Flying Cloud collided with the paddle steamer Lady Brisbane and both vessels sank in the Clyde at Bowling, Dunbartonshire. More than 100 passengers from Lady Brisbane were landed safely. Flying Cloud was on a voyage from Glasgow to Greenock, Renfrewshire. Her crew survived but her pilot was lost. She was refloated on 27 April, repaired and returned to service. Lady Brisbane was also later refloated, repaired and returned to service. |
| La Reine Blanche | France | The schooner collided with the barque Orchid (United Kingdom) and sank in the Bristol Channel off Ilfracombe, Devon, United Kingdom with the loss of four of her seven crew. One of the survivors was rescued by the tug Fearless (United Kingdom), the other by Orchid. La Reine Blanche was on a voyage from Newport, Monmouthshire, United Kingdom to Brest, Finistère. |
| Research | United Kingdom | The brigantine ran aground and was beached. Her crew were rescued. She was on a voyage from Maryport, Cumberland to Belfast, County Antrim. |
| Solleftea | Sweden | The barque sank at Barcelona, Spain. She was on a voyage from Newport to Barcelona. |
| Thalia | United Kingdom | The ship was destroyed by fire at Mobile, Alabama, United States. |

== 19 April ==
List of shipwrecks: 19 April 1868
| Ship | State | Description |
|---|---|---|
| Carl Andreas | Prussia | The schooner was driven ashore at Aberdeen, United Kingdom. Her six crew were rescued by the Aberdeen Lifeboat. She was on a voyage from Dysart, Fife to Montrose, Forfarshire, United Kingdom. |
| Jamaica | United Kingdom | The barque foundered in the Atlantic Ocean. Her crew were rescued by Freia Carson' (Hamburg). |
| Margaret Wemyss | United Kingdom | The ship was wrecked on the Rocks of Sheppy. Her crew were rescued. She was on a voyage from Ardrossan, Ayrshire to Tobermory, Isle of Mull. |

== 20 April ==
List of shipwrecks: 20 April 1868
| Ship | State | Description |
|---|---|---|
| Althea | United Kingdom | The ship ran aground on the Goodwin Sands, Kent. She was refloated but found to be severely leaky. |
| C. H. Turnbull | United Kingdom | The ship was driven ashore at Cape Wrath, Caithness. |
| Eugenie Julie | France | The ship was driven ashore and wrecked at Breaksea Point, Glamorgan, United Kingdom. Her crew were rescued. She was on a voyage from Brest, Finistère to Cardiff, Glamorgan. |
| Hugh Miller | United Kingdom | The schooner ran aground and was damaged at Figueira da Foz, Portugal. |
| Jane Hughes | United Kingdom | The ship was driven ashore and wrecked at Escalles, Pas-de-Calais, France. She was on a voyage from Havre de Grâce, Seine-Inférieure, France to Hartlepool, County Durham. |
| John Chism | United Kingdom | The ship was driven ashore near False Point, India and was abandoned by her crew. She was on a voyage from London to Calcutta, India. |
| Mary | United Kingdom | The schooner ran aground on the Pan Sand, in the Thames Estuary. She was refloated and beached on the Jenkin Sand before being towed in to the River Thames. |
| Mete | Flag unknown | The ship foundered in the Pacific Ocean. Her crew were rescued by Perseverante (Flag unknown). Mete was on a voyage from Montevideo, Uruguay to Valparaíso, Chile. |
| O. B. | France | The brig was wrecked at Chale, Isle of Wight, United Kingdom with the loss of her captain. She was on a voyage from Carloforte, Sicily, Italy to Antwerp, Belgium. |
| William | United Kingdom | The ship ran aground on the Maplin Sand, in the North Sea off the coast of Essex. |

== 21 April ==
List of shipwrecks: 21 April 1868
| Ship | State | Description |
|---|---|---|
| Diligence | United Kingdom | The ship was driven ashore and wrecked at Goldthrop, Pembrokeshire. Her crew were rescued. |
| Garibaldi | United Kingdom | The smack was driven ashore and wrecked near Wick, Caithness. Her crew were rescued. She was on a voyage from South Shields, County Durham to Lerwick, Shetland Islands. |
| Sparrow Hawk | United Kingdom | The ship was wrecked near Cape de Gatt, Spain. Her crew survived. She was on a voyage from Newcastle upon Tyne, Northumberland to Odesa, Russia. |
| Speedwell | United Kingdom | The smack was driven onto the Boulmer Rocks, on the coast of Northumberland. She was on a voyage from Bo'ness, Lothian to Scarborough, Yorkshire. She was refloated and resumed her voyage, but consequently foundered the next day off Coquet Island, Northumberland. Her crew survived. |
| Unnamed | Netherlands | The ship was wrecked on the Jadder. |

== 22 April ==
List of shipwrecks: 22 April 1868
| Ship | State | Description |
|---|---|---|
| Agamemnon, and Ethel | United Kingdom | Agamemnon ran into Ethel in the Hooghly River and both vessels sank, each losing four of her crew. Agamemnon was on a voyage from Calcutta, India to London. Ethel was on a voyage from Calcutta to Dundee, Forfarshire. |
| Speedy | United Kingdom | The ship struck the Fawcus Rock, on the coast of Northumberland. She was on a voyage from Bo'ness, Lothian to Yorkshire. She was refloated but was abandoned off the Coquet Lighthouse the next day and sank. |

== 23 April ==
List of shipwrecks: 23 April 1868
| Ship | State | Description |
|---|---|---|
| Concordia | Stralsund | The ship was damaged by an onboard explosion at Hartlepool, County Durham, United Kingdom. |
| Thetis | France | The ship sank off Ilfracombe, Devon, United Kingdom. Her crew were rescued. |

== 24 April ==
List of shipwrecks: 24 April 1868
| Ship | State | Description |
|---|---|---|
| Lord Brougham and Vaux | United Kingdom | The ship was wrecked on the west coast of Denmark. She was on a voyage from Newcastle upon Tyne, Northumberland to Westerwick, Shetland Islands. |
| Queen of the South | United Kingdom | The ship foundered off Saint-Gildas-de-Rhuys, Morbihan, France with the loss of all but four of the 40 people on board. Three survivors were rescued by Jeune Marie Desirée (France. Queen of the South was on a voyage from Callao and/or Lima, Peru to Nantes, Loire-Inférieure, France. |
| Trelissick | United Kingdom | The ship collided with J. C. A. (United Kingdom) and sank in the Bristol Channel off Lundy Island, Devon. Her crew were rescued by J. C. A.. She was on a voyage from Portreath, Cornwall to Pembrey, Carmarthenshire. |

== 25 April ==
List of shipwrecks: 25 April 1868
| Ship | State | Description |
|---|---|---|
| Arcturus | United States | The ship was run down and sunk of Long Point, Ontario, Canada. Her crew were rescued. She was on a voyage from Buffalo, New York to Chicago, Illinois. |
| Auchenagh | United Kingdom | The ship departed from the Clyde for Havana, Cuba. No further trace, presumed foundered with the loss of all hands. |
| Caroline Christine | United Kingdom | The ship foundered in the North Sea. She was on a voyage from Stockton-on-Tees, County Durham to Riga, Russia. |
| Isle of Arran | United Kingdom | The steamboat collided with RMS Australasian (United Kingdom) and sank in the Irish Sea with the loss of six of her eight crew. |
| Margaretta | United Kingdom | The ship ran aground on the French Reef. She was on a voyage from Minatitlán, Mexico to Queenstown, County Cork. She was refloated with assistance. |
| Morgan | United Kingdom | The ship foundered in the North Sea. She was on a voyage from Portmadoc, Caernarfonshire to Copenhagen, Denmark. |

== 26 April ==
List of shipwrecks: 26 April 1868
| Ship | State | Description |
|---|---|---|
| Auguste | France | The ship sank off Saint-Vaast-la-Hougue, Manche. |
| Daring | United Kingdom | The ship departed from The Downs for Melbourne, Victoria. No further trace, presumed foundered with the loss of all hands. |

== 27 April ==
List of shipwrecks: 27 April 1868
| Ship | State | Description |
|---|---|---|
| John Palmer | United Kingdom | The smack foundered off the Mull of Kintyre, Argyllshire. Her crew were rescued. She was on a voyage from Ardrossan, Ayrshire to Lismore, County Down. |
| Kate | United Kingdom | The schooner was driven ashore at Peterhead, Aberdeenshire. She was on a voyage from Sunderland, County Durham to Lossiemouth, Moray. |
| Rosario | France | The ship ran aground in the Loire. She was on a voyage from Nantes to Réunion. |
| Surf | United Kingdom | The schooner ran aground at Ballyhack, County Wexford. She was refloated with assistance from the tug Tintern (United Kingdom). |

== 29 April ==
List of shipwrecks: 29 April 1868
| Ship | State | Description |
|---|---|---|
| Colbert | France | The ship was wrecked on Devil's Point, Mauritius. Her crew were rescued. |
| John C. Wade | United Kingdom | The schooner was abandoned off Ayr. Her five crew were rescued by the Ayr Lifeboat Glasgow Workman ( Royal National Lifeboat Institution). |

== 30 April ==
List of shipwrecks: 30 April 1868
| Ship | State | Description |
|---|---|---|
| HMS Meance | Royal Navy | The ship ran aground off Dungeness, Kent. Subsequently refloated, repaired and returned to service. |
| T. E. Foster | United Kingdom | The steamship ran aground at Cape Ronne. She was on a voyage from Taganrog, Russia to Falmouth, Cornwall. She was refloated and resumed her voyage. |

== Unknown date ==
List of shipwrecks: Unknown date in April 1868
| Ship | State | Description |
|---|---|---|
| Antoinette | United Kingdom | The ship was destroyed by fire in the Atlantic Ocean. Her crew were rescued. She was on a voyage from Paraíba, Brazil to Liverpool, Lancashire. |
| Brechin Castle | United Kingdom | The ship was abandoned in the Indian Ocean before 29 April. She was on a voyage from Rangoon, Burma to Falmouth, Cornwall. |
| Cayaltil | United States | The barque, which had been seized by coolies who had murdered her officers, was presumed to have been wrecked in the Sea of Okhotsk. She had departed from Callao for Arequipa, Peru on 1 February. |
| Hydree | United Kingdom | The transport ship was driven ashore in the Red Sea before 24 April. She was refloated and taken in to Bombay, India. |
| Living Age | United States | The ship was destroyed by fire in the Indian Ocean off the Maldive Islands. Her crew survived. |
| Lydia Williams | United Kingdom | The ship was driven ashore at Holyhead, Anglesey. She was on a voyage from Liverpool, Lancashire to San Francisco, California, United States. She was refloated on 7 April and towed in to Holyhead. |
| Orta | Greece | The ship sank at Sulina, Ottoman Empire. |
| Pierre Antoine | Spain | The schooner was driven ashore and wrecked at Alicante, Spain. |
| St. Clair | United Kingdom | The ship was wrecked at Alvarado before 25 April. |
| Syren | United Kingdom | The transport ship was abandoned off Madagascar with the loss of three of her crew. She was on a voyage from Liverpool to Aden. |
