= CQF =

CQF may refer to:

- the IATA code for Calais–Dunkerque Airport
- Conference quarter final in hockey and other sports
- Certificate in Quantitative Finance
