= Château de Coulogne =

Castle in Coulogne, Pas-de-Calais, France

Château de Coulogne was a castle in Coulogne, Pas-de-Calais, France.

== History ==
In 1214, the castle was slighted by Ferdinand, Count of Flanders.

The castle fell to the English in 1347. It was handed over to the English as part of the Treaty of Brétigny in 1360.

Francis, Duke of Guise ordered the destruction of the castle in 1558.
