= Pihen-lès-Guînes =

Pihen-lès-Guînes Pittem
- Commune
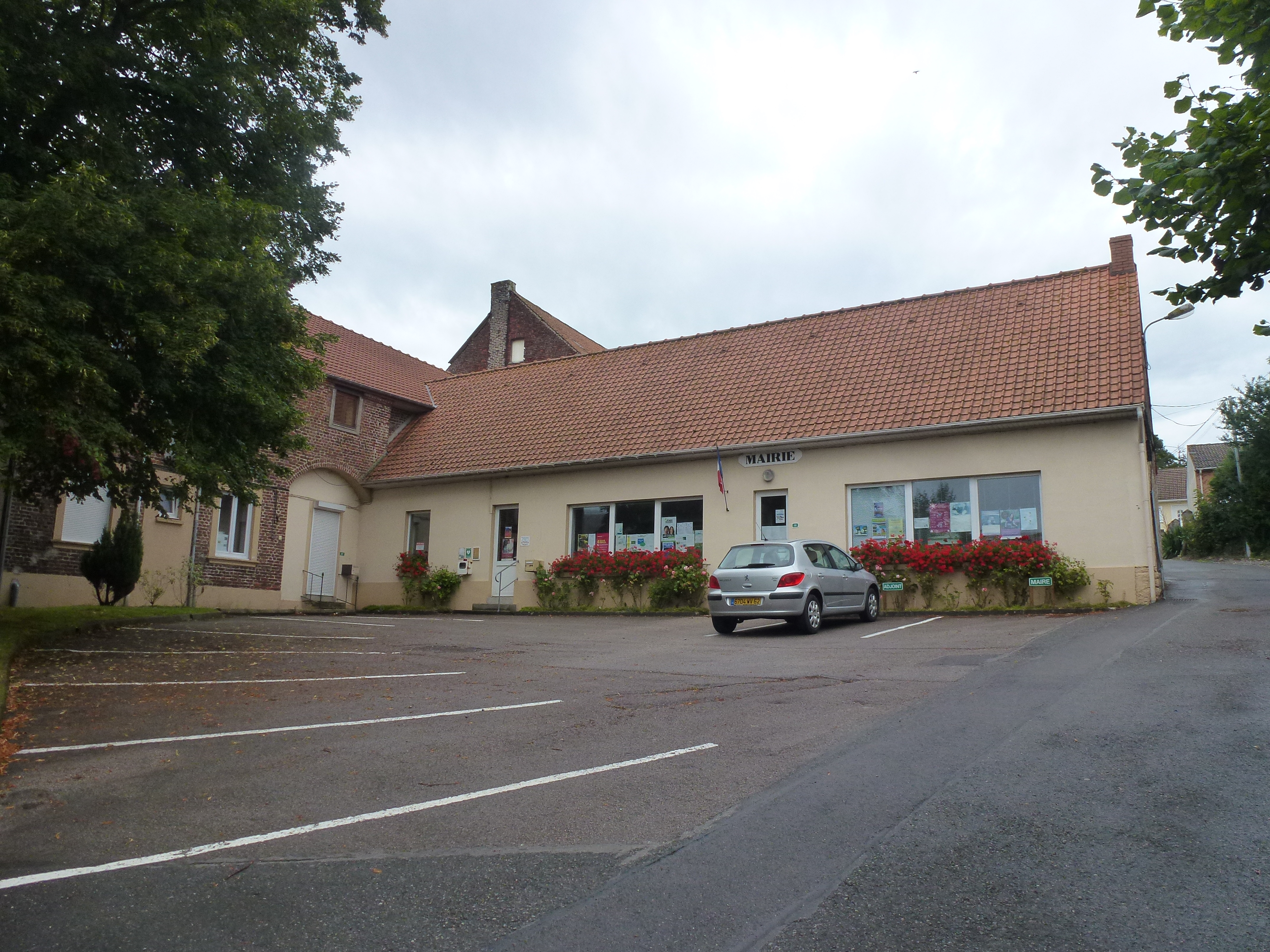
- The town hall of Pihen-lès-Guînes

- Coat of arms
- Location of Pihen-lès-Guînes
- Location within France Location within Hauts-de-France
- Coordinates: 50°52′20″N 1°47′15″E
- Country: France
- Region: Hauts-de-France
- Department: Pas-de-Calais
- Arrondissement: Calais
- Canton: Calais-1
- Intercommunality: CA Grand Calais Terres et Mers

Government
  - Mayor (2020–2026): Jean-Luc Marot
- Area^{1}: 9.25 km^{2} (3.57 sq mi)
- Elevation: 51 m (167 ft)
- Highest elevation: 121 m (397 ft)
- Lowest elevation: 23 m (75 ft)
- Population (2023): 545
  - Density: 58.9/km^{2} (153/sq mi)
- Time zone: UTC+01:00 (CET)
  - Summer (DST): UTC+02:00 (CEST)
- INSEE/Postal code: 62657 /62340
- ^{1} French Land Register data, which excludes lakes, ponds, glaciers > 1 km^{2} (0.386 sq mi or 247 acres) and river estuaries.

Pihen-lès-Guînes (West Flemish: Pittem) is a commune in the Pas-de-Calais department in the Hauts-de-France region of France 7 miles (11 km) southwest of Calais.

== Population ==
Historical population
Year	Pop.	±% p.a.
1968	349	—
1975	309	−1.72%
1982	357	+2.08%
1990	413	+1.84%
1999	394	−0.52%
2007	489	+2.74%
2012	462	−1.13%
2017	499	+1.55%
2023	545	+1.48%
Source: INSEE

== See also ==
- Communes of the Pas-de-Calais department
