= Calais–Dunkerque Airport =

Calais–Dunkerque Airport Aéroport de Calais - Dunkerque
- IATA: CQF; ICAO: LFAC

Summary
- Airport type: Public
- Operator: Communauté d’agglomération du Calaisis
- Serves: Calais / Dunkerque
- Location: Marck, Pas-de-Calais, France
- Elevation AMSL: 12 ft (3.7 m)
- Coordinates: 50°57′39″N 001°57′05″E

Maps
- Location of Hauts-de-France region in France

- Location of airport in Hauts-de-France region

Runways
Direction	Length		Surface
Direction	m	ft	Surface
06/24	1,535	5,036	Asphalt
- Sources: French AIP, UAF,

Calais–Dunkerque Airport (French: Aéroport de Calais - Dunkerque) (IATA: CQF, ICAO: LFAC) is an airport located in Marck, 7 km (4 mi) east-northeast of Calais, in the Pas-de-Calais department in the Hauts-de-France region of France. The airport also serves Dunkerque (a commune in the Nord department).

== History ==
In the 1950s and early 1960s, the airport was busy with cross-channel service, including car ferry flights, by private airlines such as Silver City Airways and Channel Air Bridge, later merged into British United Air Ferries.

On 9 July 2015, the Airbus E-Fan landed at Calais–Dunkerque Airport after a flight from Lydd Airport. Initially this was claimed as the first electric aircraft to cross the English Channel, but it has since been pointed out that there were previous such flights, including one as long ago as 1981.

== Facilities ==
The airport is at an elevation of 12 feet (4 m) above mean sea level. It has one paved runway designated 06/24 which measures 1,535 by 45 metres (5,036 ft × 148 ft).
