= Grand Calais Terres et Mers =

Coordinates: 50.95°N 1.86°E

- Communauté d'agglomération
- Location of Grand Calais Terres et Mers within the department
- Country: France
- Region: Hauts-de-France
- Department: Pas-de-Calais
- No. of communes: {{{nbcomm}}}
- Established: 28 December 2000

Government
  - President: Natacha Bouchart
- Area: 184.1 km^{2} (71.1 sq mi)
- Population (2018): 104,367
  - Density: 566.9/km^{2} (1,468/sq mi)
- Website: www.grandcalais.fr

Grand Calais Terres et Mers (French pronunciation: [ɡʁɑ̃ kalɛ tɛʁ e mɛʁ]; before 2017: Communauté d'agglomération du Calaisis) is an agglomeration community created on 28 December 2000 and located in the Pas-de-Calais département, in northern France. It was expanded with four communes from the Communauté de communes des Pays d'Opale on 1 December 2019. Its area is 184.1 km^{2}. Its population was 104,367 in 2018, of which 72,929 in Calais proper.

It comprises the following 14 communes:

- Les Attaques
- Bonningues-lès-Calais
- Calais
- Coquelles
- Coulogne
- Escalles
- Fréthun
- Hames-Boucres
- Marck
- Nielles-lès-Calais
- Peuplingues
- Pihen-lès-Guînes
- Saint-Tricat
- Sangatte
