= Hames-Boucres =

- Commune
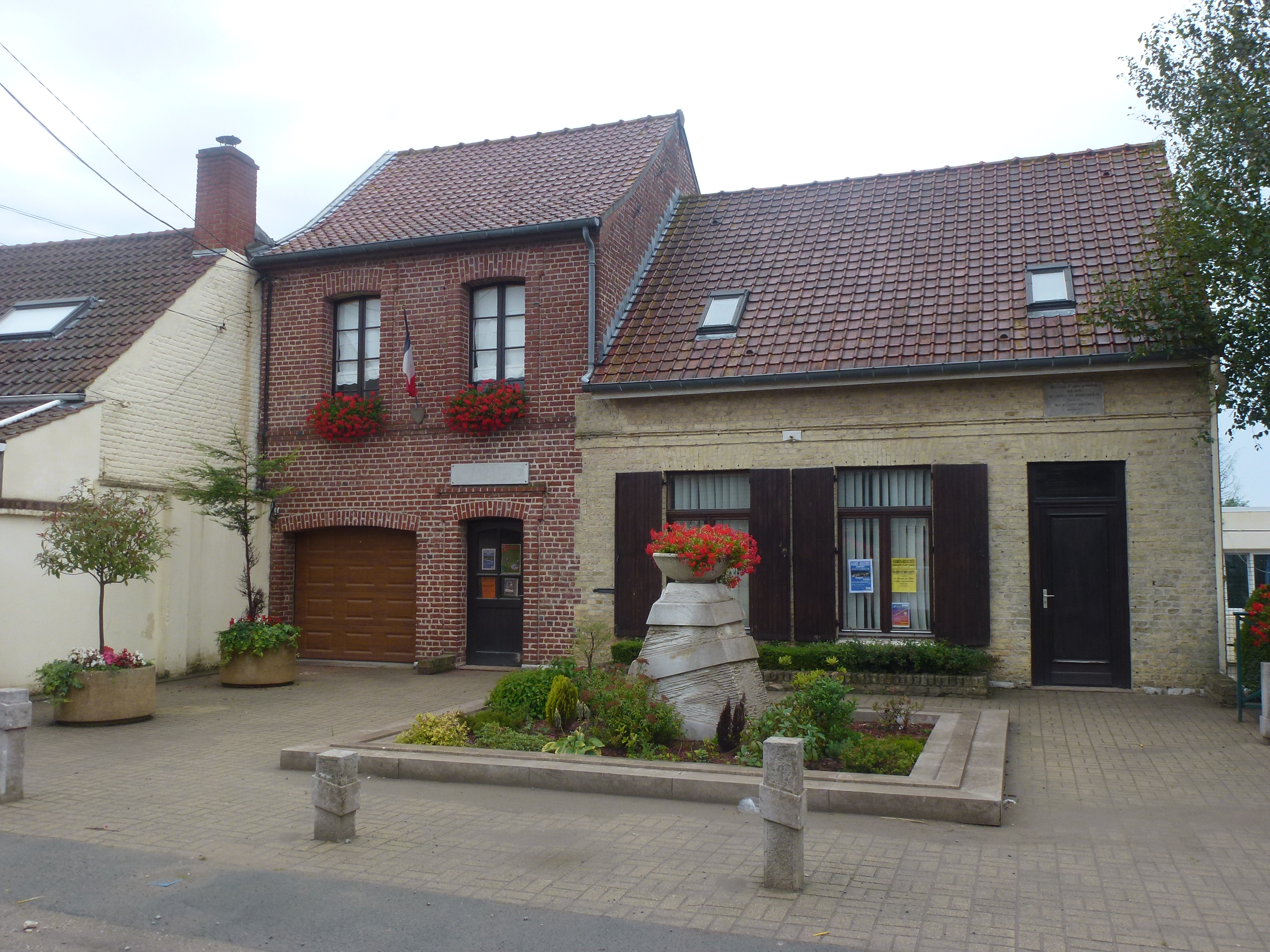
- The ancient town hall of Hames-Boucres

- Coat of arms
- Location of Hames-Boucres
- Location within France Location within Hauts-de-France
- Coordinates: 50°52′56″N 1°50′37″E
- Country: France
- Region: Hauts-de-France
- Department: Pas-de-Calais
- Arrondissement: Calais
- Canton: Calais-1
- Intercommunality: CA Grand Calais Terres et Mers

Government
  - Mayor (2020–2026): Philippe Bouchel
- Area^{1}: 12.82 km^{2} (4.95 sq mi)
- Elevation: 5 m (16 ft)
- Highest elevation: 86 m (282 ft)
- Lowest elevation: 0 m (0 ft)
- Population (2023): 1,439
  - Density: 112.2/km^{2} (290.7/sq mi)
- Time zone: UTC+01:00 (CET)
  - Summer (DST): UTC+02:00 (CEST)
- INSEE/Postal code: 62408 /62340
- ^{1} French Land Register data, which excludes lakes, ponds, glaciers > 1 km^{2} (0.386 sq mi or 247 acres) and river estuaries.

Hames-Boucres (French pronunciation: [am bukʁ]) is a commune in the Pas-de-Calais department in the Hauts-de-France region of France 6 miles (9 km) southwest of Calais.

== History ==
The commune was created from the two former parishes of Hames and Boucres in 1819.

== Population ==
Historical population
Year	Pop.	±% p.a.
1968	851	—
1975	964	+1.80%
1982	1,047	+1.19%
1990	1,017	−0.36%
1999	1,106	+0.94%
2007	1,316	+2.20%
2012	1,455	+2.03%
2017	1,469	+0.19%
2023	1,439	−0.34%
Source: INSEE

== See also ==
- Communes of the Pas-de-Calais department
