= Les Attaques =

- Commune
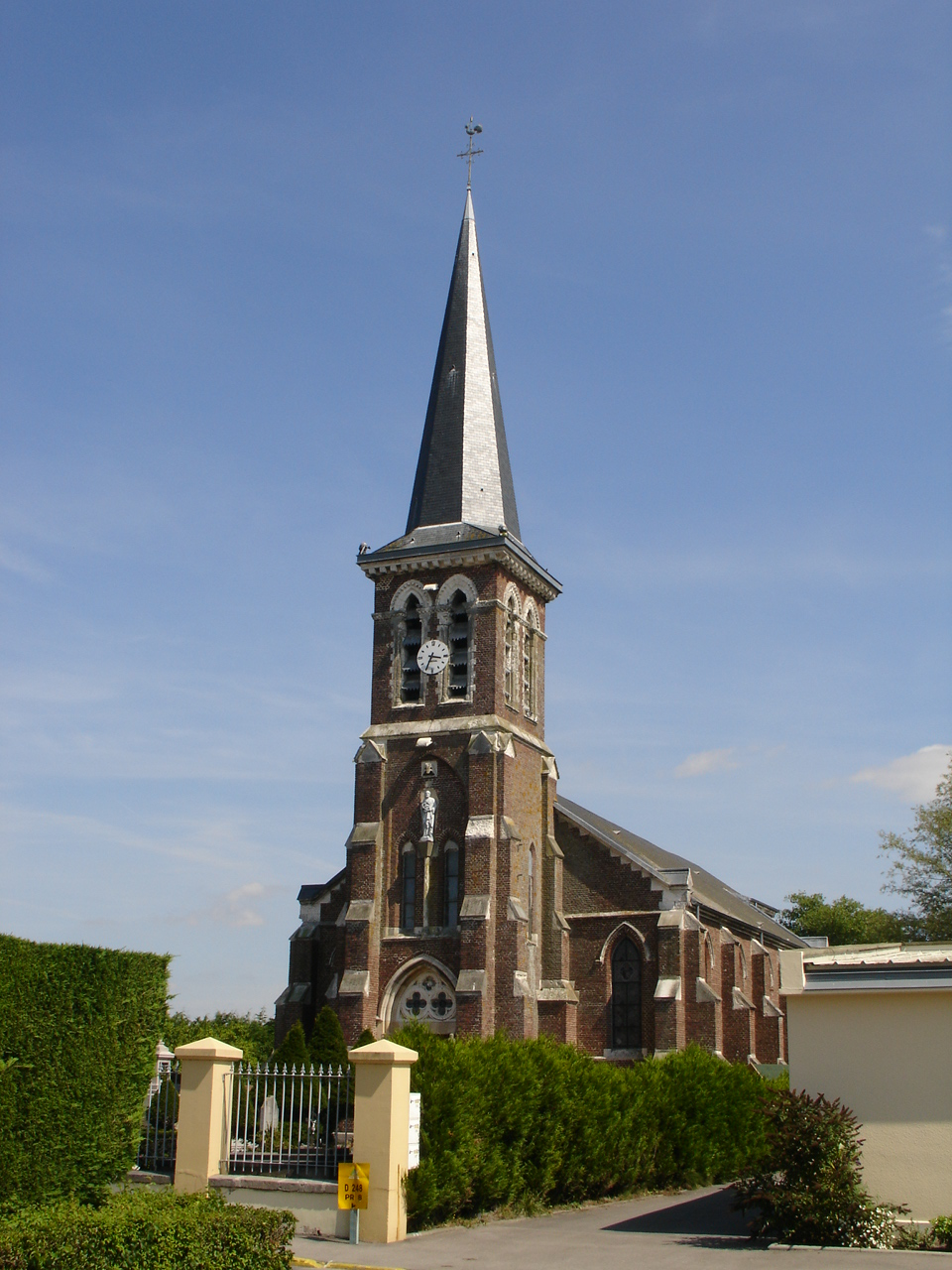
- The church of Les Attaques

- Coat of arms
- Location of Les Attaques
- Location within France Location within Hauts-de-France
- Coordinates: 50°54′28″N 1°56′05″E
- Country: France
- Region: Hauts-de-France
- Department: Pas-de-Calais
- Arrondissement: Calais
- Canton: Calais-2
- Intercommunality: CA Grand Calais Terres et Mers

Government
  - Mayor (2020–2026): Nadine Denièle-Vanpouille
- Area^{1}: 20.81 km^{2} (8.03 sq mi)
- Elevation: 3 m (9.8 ft)
- Highest elevation: 6 m (20 ft)
- Lowest elevation: 0 m (0 ft)
- Population (2023): 2,064
  - Density: 99.18/km^{2} (256.9/sq mi)
- Time zone: UTC+01:00 (CET)
  - Summer (DST): UTC+02:00 (CEST)
- INSEE/Postal code: 62043 /62730
- ^{1} French Land Register data, which excludes lakes, ponds, glaciers > 1 km^{2} (0.386 sq mi or 247 acres) and river estuaries.

Les Attaques (French pronunciation: [lez‿atak]) is a commune in the Pas-de-Calais department in the Hauts-de-France region of France.

== Geography ==
A large farming and light industrial village located 4 miles (6 km) southeast of Calais, at the junction of the N43 and D248 roads. Both the A26 "autoroute des Anglais" and the Calais-St. Omer canal pass through the commune.

== Population ==
Historical population
Year	Pop.	±% p.a.
1968	1,790	—
1975	1,775	−0.12%
1982	1,878	+0.81%
1990	1,887	+0.06%
1999	1,821	−0.39%
2007	2,039	+1.42%
2012	1,939	−1.00%
2017	1,978	+0.40%
2023	2,064	+0.71%
Source: INSEE

== Sights ==
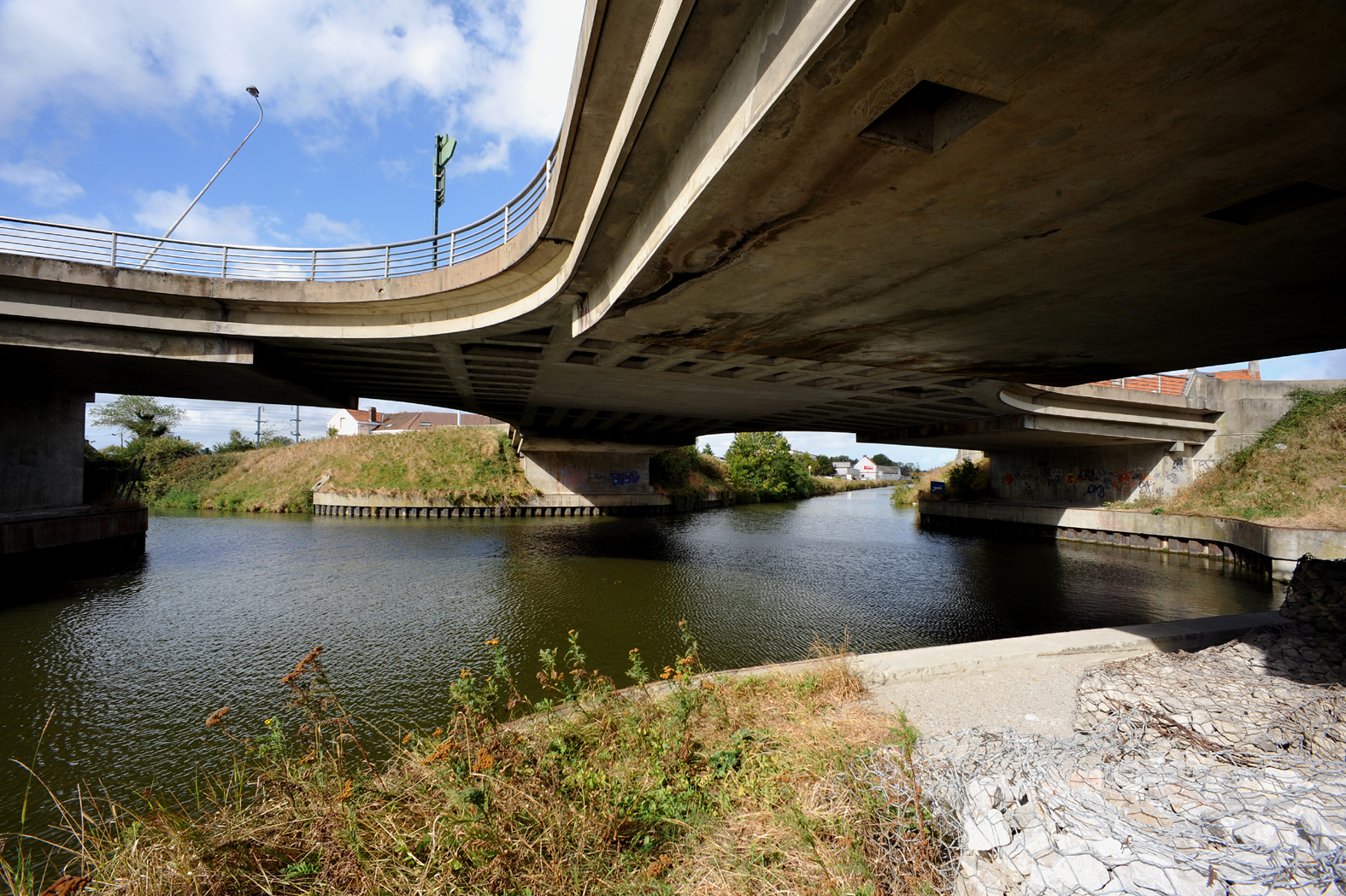
Underside of Les Attaques' four-way bridge

- The church of St. Pierre, dating from the nineteenth century.
- The nineteenth-century chateau Brûlé.
- Vestiges of a Capuchin abbey.
- A rare four-branch bridge

== See also ==
- Communes of the Pas-de-Calais department
