= Coulogne =

- Commune
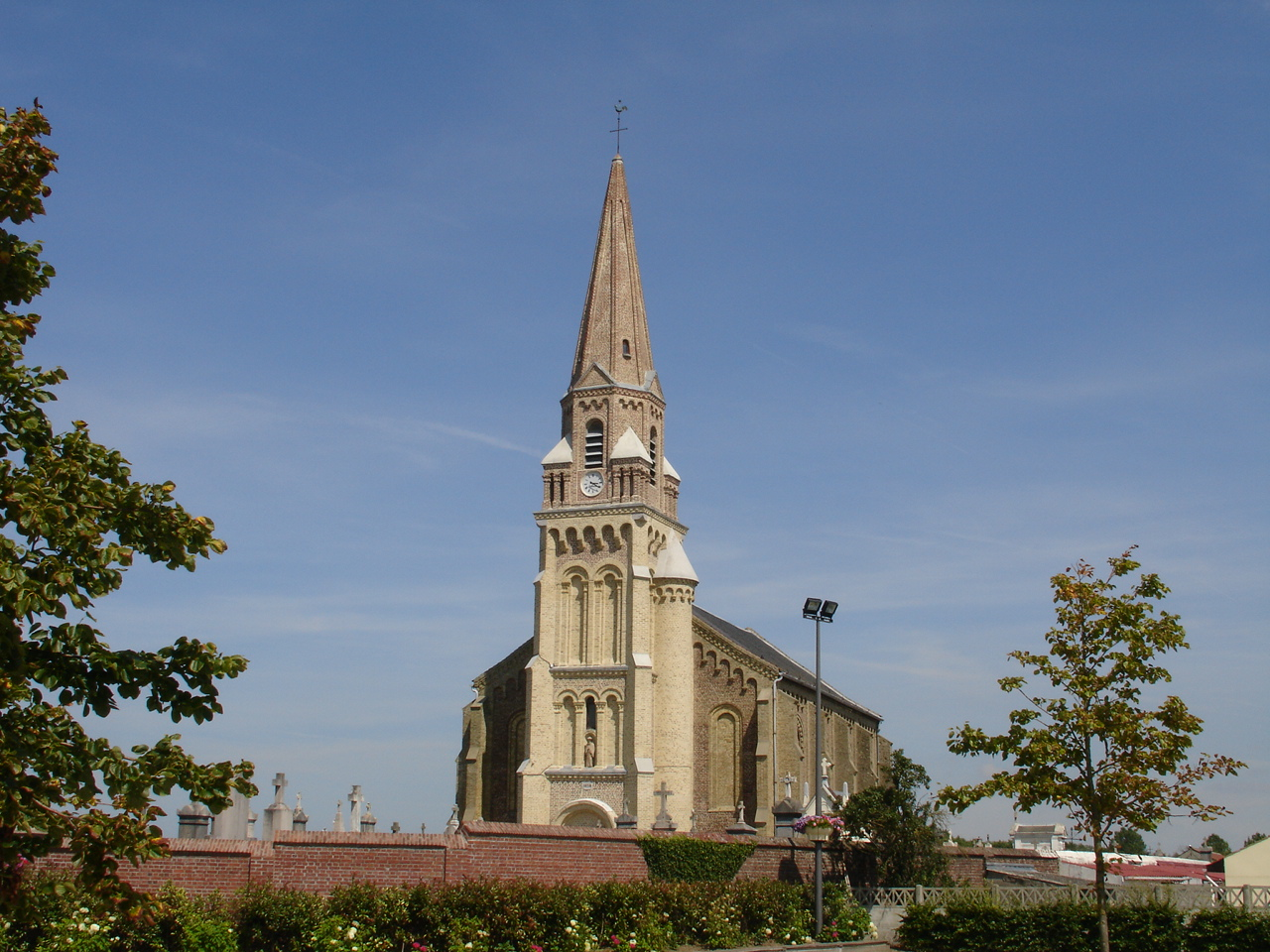
- The church of Coulogne

- Coat of arms
- Location of Coulogne
- Location within France Location within Hauts-de-France
- Coordinates: 50°55′30″N 1°53′09″E
- Country: France
- Region: Hauts-de-France
- Department: Pas-de-Calais
- Arrondissement: Calais
- Canton: Calais-2
- Intercommunality: CA Grand Calais Terres et Mers

Government
  - Mayor (2023–2026): Guillaume Loeuilleux
- Area^{1}: 9.16 km^{2} (3.54 sq mi)
- Elevation: 3 m (9.8 ft)
- Highest elevation: 7 m (23 ft)
- Lowest elevation: 0 m (0 ft)
- Population (2023): 5,438
  - Density: 594/km^{2} (1,540/sq mi)
- Time zone: UTC+01:00 (CET)
  - Summer (DST): UTC+02:00 (CEST)
- INSEE/Postal code: 62244 /62137
- ^{1} French Land Register data, which excludes lakes, ponds, glaciers > 1 km^{2} (0.386 sq mi or 247 acres) and river estuaries.

Coulogne (French pronunciation: [kulɔɲ]) is a commune in the Pas-de-Calais department, region of Hauts-de-France, France.

== Geography ==
A large village of light industry and farming located just 2 miles (3 km) south of Calais city centre, on the D247 road.

== Population ==
Historical population
| Year | Pop. | ±% p.a. |
|---|---|---|
| 1968 | 4,783 | — |
| 1975 | 5,194 | +1.18% |
| 1982 | 5,347 | +0.42% |
| 1990 | 5,809 | +1.04% |
| 1999 | 5,789 | −0.04% |
| 2007 | 5,837 | +0.10% |
| 2012 | 5,534 | −1.06% |
| 2017 | 5,372 | −0.59% |
| 2023 | 5,438 | +0.20% |
Source: INSEE

== Places of interest ==
- The church of St.Jacques, dating from the nineteenth century.
- The ruins of an ancient château, destroyed in 1560.
- An eighteenth century sluice-gate.

== Transport ==
The Chemin de fer d'Anvin à Calais opened a railway station at Coulogne in 1881. The railway closed in 1955.

== See also ==
- Communes of the Pas-de-Calais department
