= Coquelles =

Coquelles Kalkwelle
- Commune
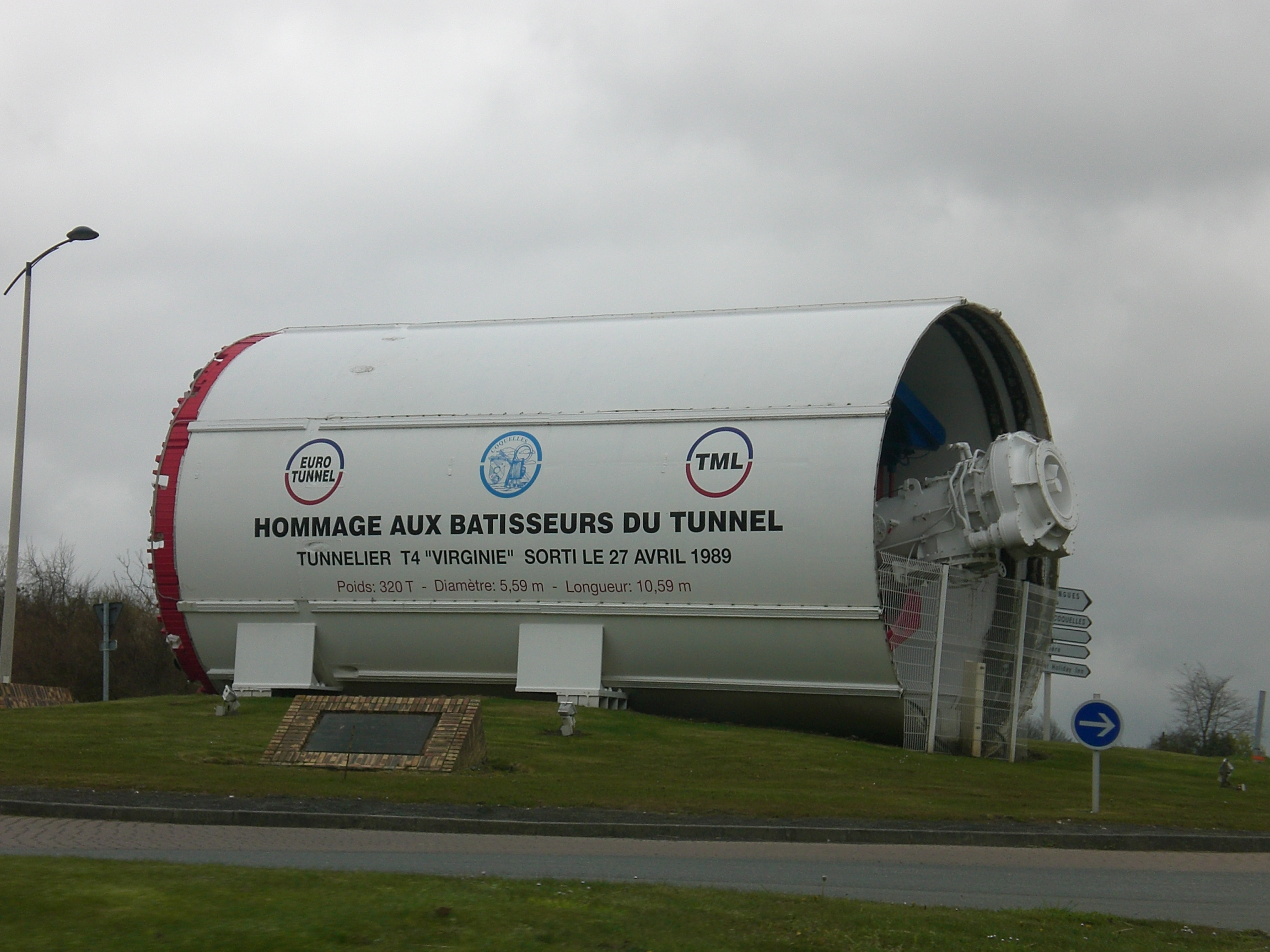
- The tunnel boring machine in Coquelles, as a tribute to the builders of the tunnel

- Coat of arms
- Location of Coquelles
- Location within France Location within Hauts-de-France
- Coordinates: 50°56′06″N 1°48′00″E
- Country: France
- Region: Hauts-de-France
- Department: Pas-de-Calais
- Arrondissement: Calais
- Canton: Calais-1
- Intercommunality: CA Grand Calais Terres et Mers

Government
  - Mayor (2020–2026): Michel Hamy
- Area^{1}: 8.77 km^{2} (3.39 sq mi)
- Elevation: 49 m (161 ft)
- Highest elevation: 53 m (174 ft)
- Lowest elevation: 0 m (0 ft)
- Population (2023): 2,638
  - Density: 301/km^{2} (779/sq mi)
- Time zone: UTC+01:00 (CET)
  - Summer (DST): UTC+02:00 (CEST)
- INSEE/Postal code: 62239 /62231
- ^{1} French Land Register data, which excludes lakes, ponds, glaciers > 1 km^{2} (0.386 sq mi or 247 acres) and river estuaries.

Coquelles (French pronunciation: [kɔkɛl]; West Flemish: Kalkwelle) is a commune in the Pas-de-Calais department near Calais in northern France.

The town comprises a shopping centre, hotels and farm in Vieille Coquelles (old Coquelles), part of the L'Européenne autoroute (A16) and the Channel Tunnel terminal.

The Eurotunnel Calais Terminal is located in Coquelles off the A16, exit 42. This is the terminus of shuttle services from the UK, as well as the terminus of the LGV Nord, whereby Eurostar services can travel into the Channel Tunnel.

== Population ==
Historical population
Year	Pop.	±% p.a.
1968	1,158	—
1975	1,248	+1.07%
1982	2,081	+7.58%
1990	2,133	+0.31%
1999	2,370	+1.18%
2007	2,349	−0.11%
2012	2,311	−0.33%
2017	2,611	+2.47%
2023	2,638	+0.17%
Source: INSEE

== Politics ==
Mayors

Périod		Identity	Qualifications
October 1940	July 1975	Abel Mobailly (1898–1975)	Farmer and livestock breeder who died in service.
July 1975	March 1983	Michel Grassien	School Director
March 1983	June 1995	Pierre Crespel	Teacher
June 1995	May 2003	Astrid Crespel	Resigned.
June 2003	June 2006	Michel Selingue (1957–2009)	Died in service.
June 2006	On going (February 7, 2022)	Michel Hamy	Bank Employee First Deputy Mayor (2001 → 2006) General Councillor for Calais-Nord-Ouest (2008 → 2015) Departmental Councillor for Calais-1 (2015 → ) Reelected for the 2014–2020 term, Reelected for the 2020–2026 term

== See also ==
- Communes of the Pas-de-Calais department
- France–UK border
