= Peuplingues =

Peuplingues Peuplingen
- Commune
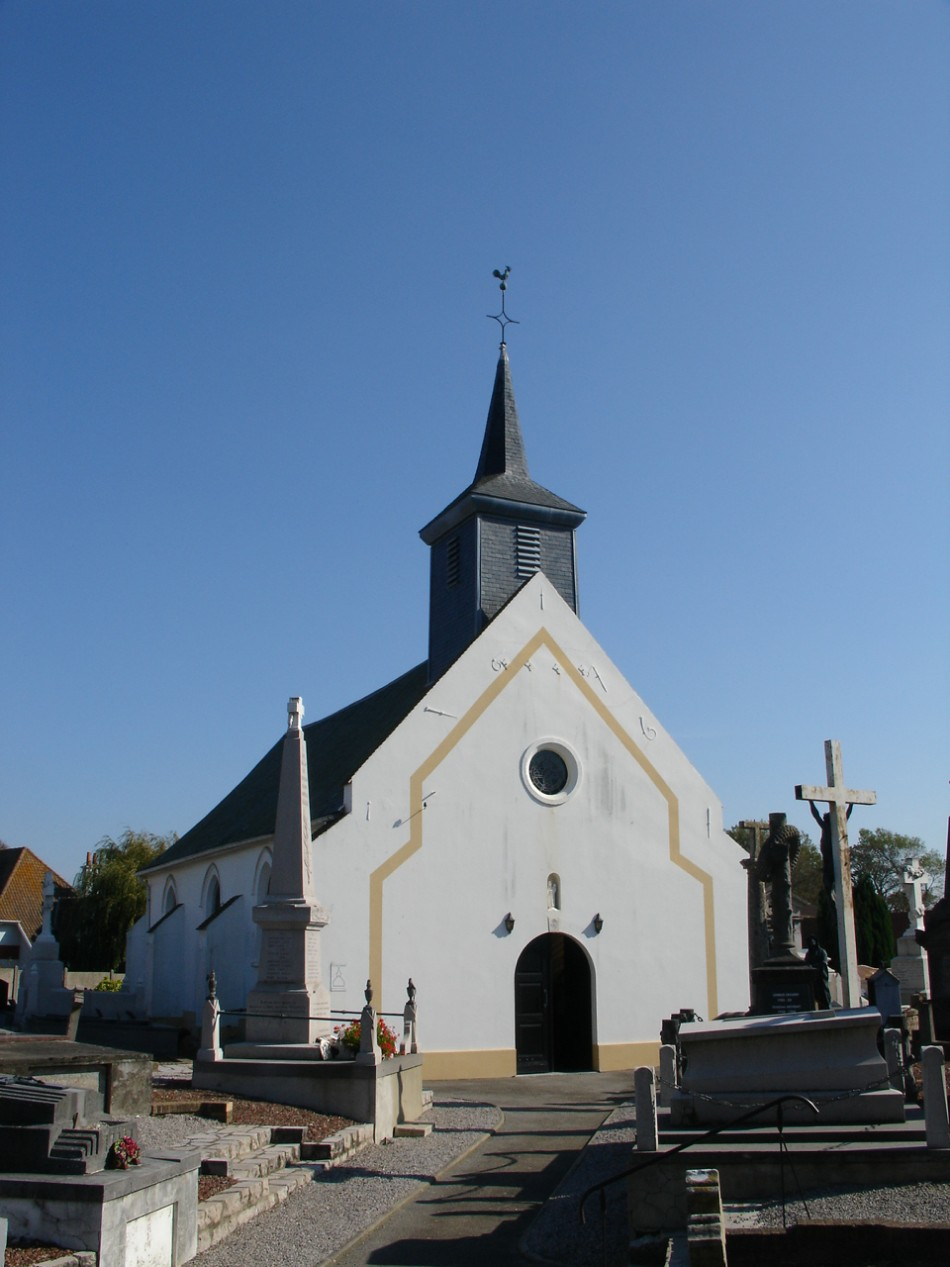
- The church of Peuplingues

- Coat of arms
- Location of Peuplingues
- Location within France Location within Hauts-de-France
- Coordinates: 50°54′56″N 1°46′05″E
- Country: France
- Region: Hauts-de-France
- Department: Pas-de-Calais
- Arrondissement: Calais
- Canton: Calais-1
- Intercommunality: CA Grand Calais Terres et Mers

Government
  - Mayor (2020–2026): Jean-François Lacroix
- Area^{1}: 10.43 km^{2} (4.03 sq mi)
- Elevation: 85 m (279 ft)
- Highest elevation: 137 m (449 ft)
- Lowest elevation: 11 m (36 ft)
- Population (2023): 789
  - Density: 75.6/km^{2} (196/sq mi)
- Time zone: UTC+01:00 (CET)
  - Summer (DST): UTC+02:00 (CEST)
- INSEE/Postal code: 62654 /62231
- ^{1} French Land Register data, which excludes lakes, ponds, glaciers > 1 km^{2} (0.386 sq mi or 247 acres) and river estuaries.

Peuplingues (French pronunciation: [pœplɛ̃ɡ]) is a commune in the Pas-de-Calais department in the Hauts-de-France region of France 5 miles (8 km) southwest of Calais. The French entrance to the Channel Tunnel is located in Peuplingues.

== Population ==
Historical population
Year	Pop.	±% p.a.
1968	449	—
1975	409	−1.32%
1982	480	+2.31%
1990	537	+1.41%
1999	586	+0.97%
2007	610	+0.50%
2012	756	+4.39%
2017	777	+0.55%
2023	789	+0.26%
Source: INSEE

== See also ==
- Communes of the Pas-de-Calais department
