= Saint-Tricat =

Saint-Tricat Sintergaas
- Commune
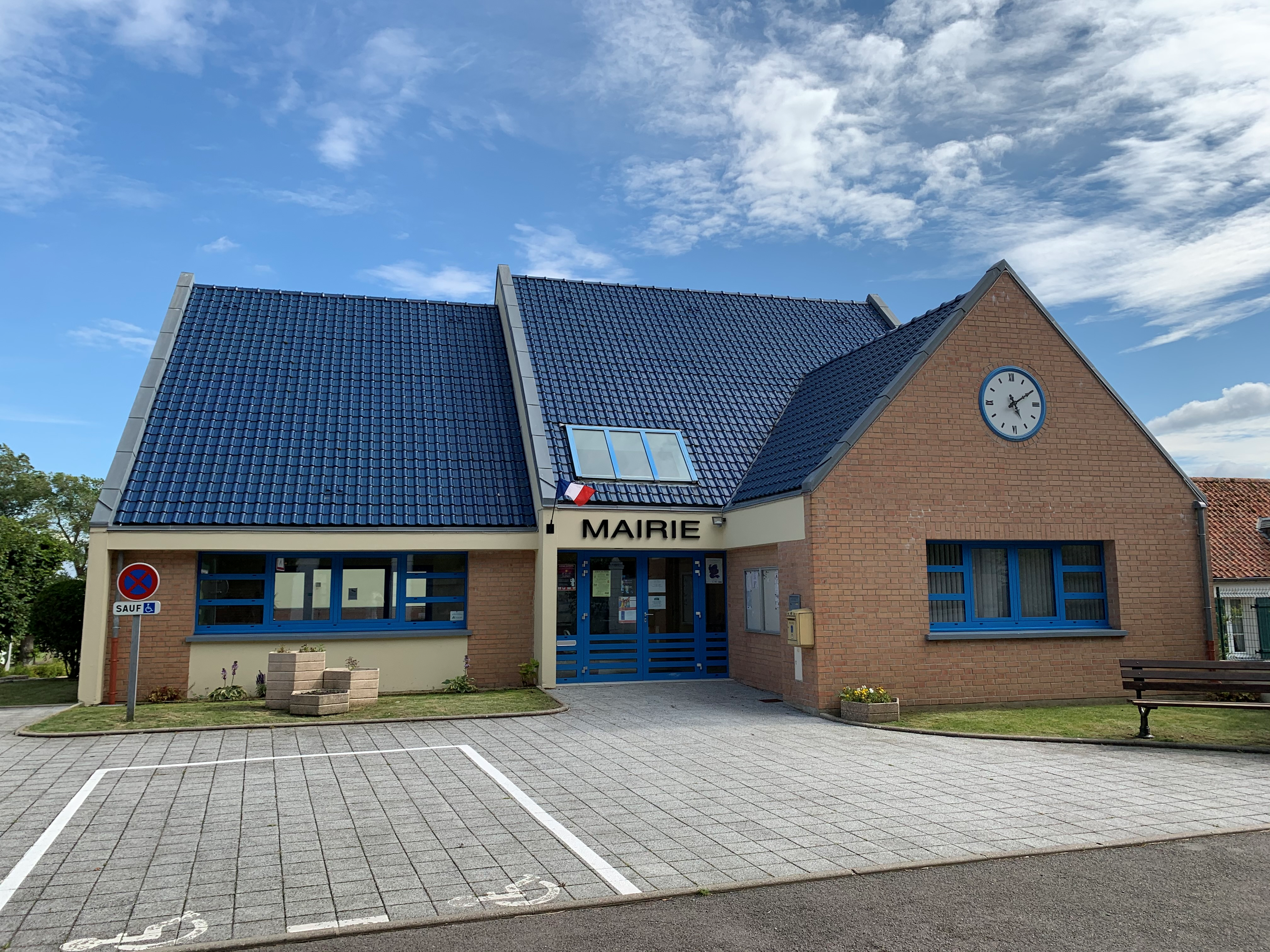
- The town hall of Saint-Tricat

- Coat of arms
- Location of Saint-Tricat
- Location within France Location within Hauts-de-France
- Coordinates: 50°53′38″N 1°49′53″E
- Country: France
- Region: Hauts-de-France
- Department: Pas-de-Calais
- Arrondissement: Calais
- Canton: Calais-1
- Intercommunality: CA Grand Calais Terres et Mers

Government
  - Mayor (2022–2026): Sébastien Castelle
- Area^{1}: 7.35 km^{2} (2.84 sq mi)
- Elevation: 10 m (33 ft)
- Highest elevation: 63 m (207 ft)
- Lowest elevation: 1 m (3.3 ft)
- Population (2023): 773
  - Density: 105/km^{2} (272/sq mi)
- Time zone: UTC+01:00 (CET)
  - Summer (DST): UTC+02:00 (CEST)
- INSEE/Postal code: 62769 /62185
- ^{1} French Land Register data, which excludes lakes, ponds, glaciers > 1 km^{2} (0.386 sq mi or 247 acres) and river estuaries.

Saint-Tricat (French pronunciation: [sɛ̃ tʁika]; West Flemish: Sintergaas) is a commune in the Pas-de-Calais department in the Hauts-de-France region of France 5 miles (8 km) southwest of Calais.

== Population ==
Historical population
| Year | Pop. | ±% p.a. |
|---|---|---|
| 1968 | 478 | — |
| 1975 | 457 | −0.64% |
| 1982 | 531 | +2.17% |
| 1990 | 556 | +0.58% |
| 1999 | 614 | +1.11% |
| 2007 | 653 | +0.77% |
| 2012 | 683 | +0.90% |
| 2017 | 760 | +2.16% |
| 2023 | 773 | +0.28% |
Source: INSEE

== See also ==
- Communes of the Pas-de-Calais department
