= Nielles-lès-Calais =

- Commune
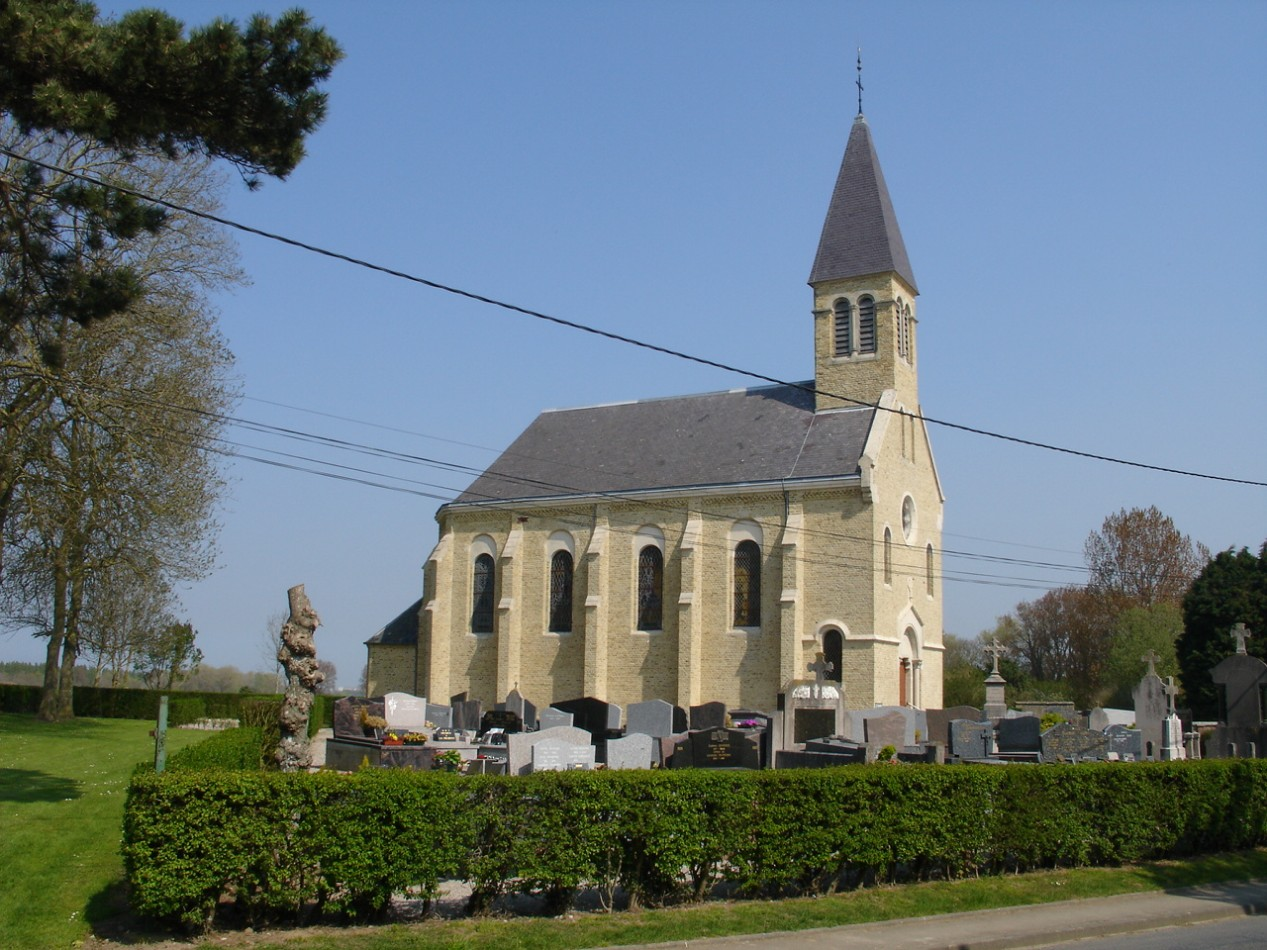
- The church of Nielles-lès-Calais

- Coat of arms
- Location of Nielles-lès-Calais
- Location within France Location within Hauts-de-France
- Coordinates: 50°54′29″N 1°49′45″E
- Country: France
- Region: Hauts-de-France
- Department: Pas-de-Calais
- Arrondissement: Calais
- Canton: Calais-1
- Intercommunality: CA Grand Calais Terres et Mers

Government
  - Mayor (2020–2026): Bernard Delalin
- Area^{1}: 2.49 km^{2} (0.96 sq mi)
- Elevation: 4 m (13 ft)
- Highest elevation: 59 m (194 ft)
- Lowest elevation: 2 m (6.6 ft)
- Population (2023): 280
  - Density: 110/km^{2} (290/sq mi)
- Time zone: UTC+01:00 (CET)
  - Summer (DST): UTC+02:00 (CEST)
- INSEE/Postal code: 62615 /62185
- ^{1} French Land Register data, which excludes lakes, ponds, glaciers > 1 km^{2} (0.386 sq mi or 247 acres) and river estuaries.

Nielles-lès-Calais (French pronunciation: [njɛl lɛ kalɛ], literally Nielles near Calais) is a commune in the Pas-de-Calais department in the Hauts-de-France region of France 4 miles (6 km) south of Calais.

== Population ==
Historical population
Year	Pop.	±% p.a.
1968	119	—
1975	111	−0.99%
1982	161	+5.46%
1990	175	+1.05%
1999	206	+1.83%
2007	225	+1.11%
2012	249	+2.05%
2017	281	+2.45%
2023	280	−0.06%
Source: INSEE

== See also ==
- Communes of the Pas-de-Calais department
