= Bonningues-lès-Calais =

Bonningues-lès-Calais Boninge
- Commune
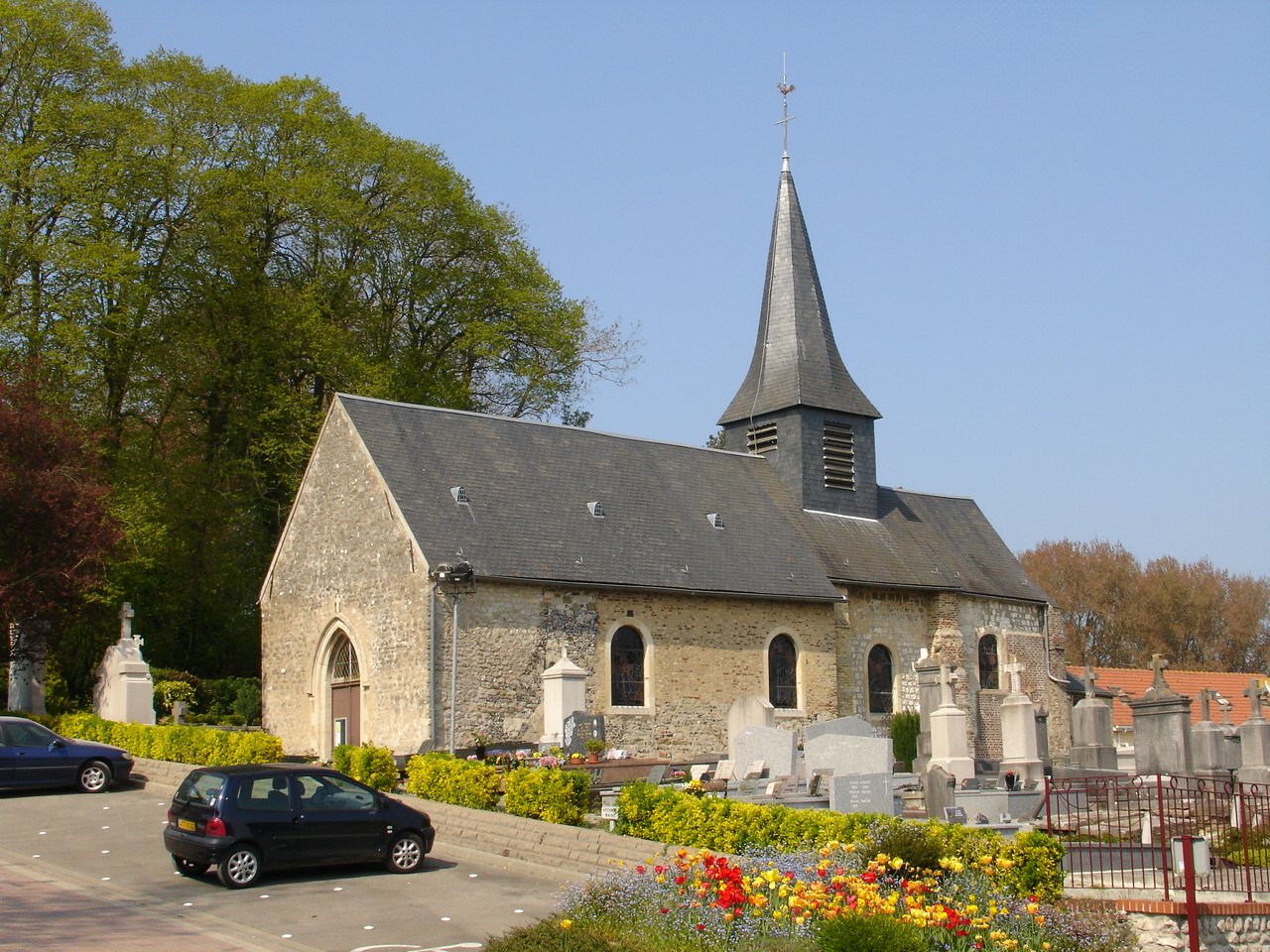
- The church of Bonningues-lès-Calais

- Coat of arms
- Location of Bonningues-lès-Calais
- Location within France Location within Hauts-de-France
- Coordinates: 50°53′28″N 1°46′32″E
- Country: France
- Region: Hauts-de-France
- Department: Pas-de-Calais
- Arrondissement: Calais
- Canton: Calais-1
- Intercommunality: CA Grand Calais Terres et Mers

Government
  - Mayor (2020–2026): Jacques Merlen
- Area^{1}: 8.49 km^{2} (3.28 sq mi)
- Elevation: 82 m (269 ft)
- Highest elevation: 131 m (430 ft)
- Lowest elevation: 22 m (72 ft)
- Population (2023): 597
  - Density: 70.3/km^{2} (182/sq mi)
- Time zone: UTC+01:00 (CET)
  - Summer (DST): UTC+02:00 (CEST)
- INSEE/Postal code: 62156 /62340
- ^{1} French Land Register data, which excludes lakes, ponds, glaciers > 1 km^{2} (0.386 sq mi or 247 acres) and river estuaries.

Bonningues-lès-Calais (French pronunciation: [bɔnɛ̃ɡ lɛ kalɛ], literally Bonningues near Calais; West Flemish: Boninge) is a commune in the Pas-de-Calais department in the Hauts-de-France region in northern France.

== Geography ==
A farming village located 5 miles (10 km) southwest of Calais, on the D243 road near to junction 39 of the A16 autoroute.

== Population ==
Historical population
Year	Pop.	±% p.a.
1968	290	—
1975	341	+2.34%
1982	394	+2.09%
1990	411	+0.53%
1999	570	+3.70%
2007	606	+0.77%
2012	633	+0.88%
2017	565	−2.25%
2023	597	+0.92%
Source: INSEE

== Sights ==
- The church of St. Pierre, dating from the twelfth century.

== See also ==
- Communes of the Pas-de-Calais department
