= Escalles =

- Commune
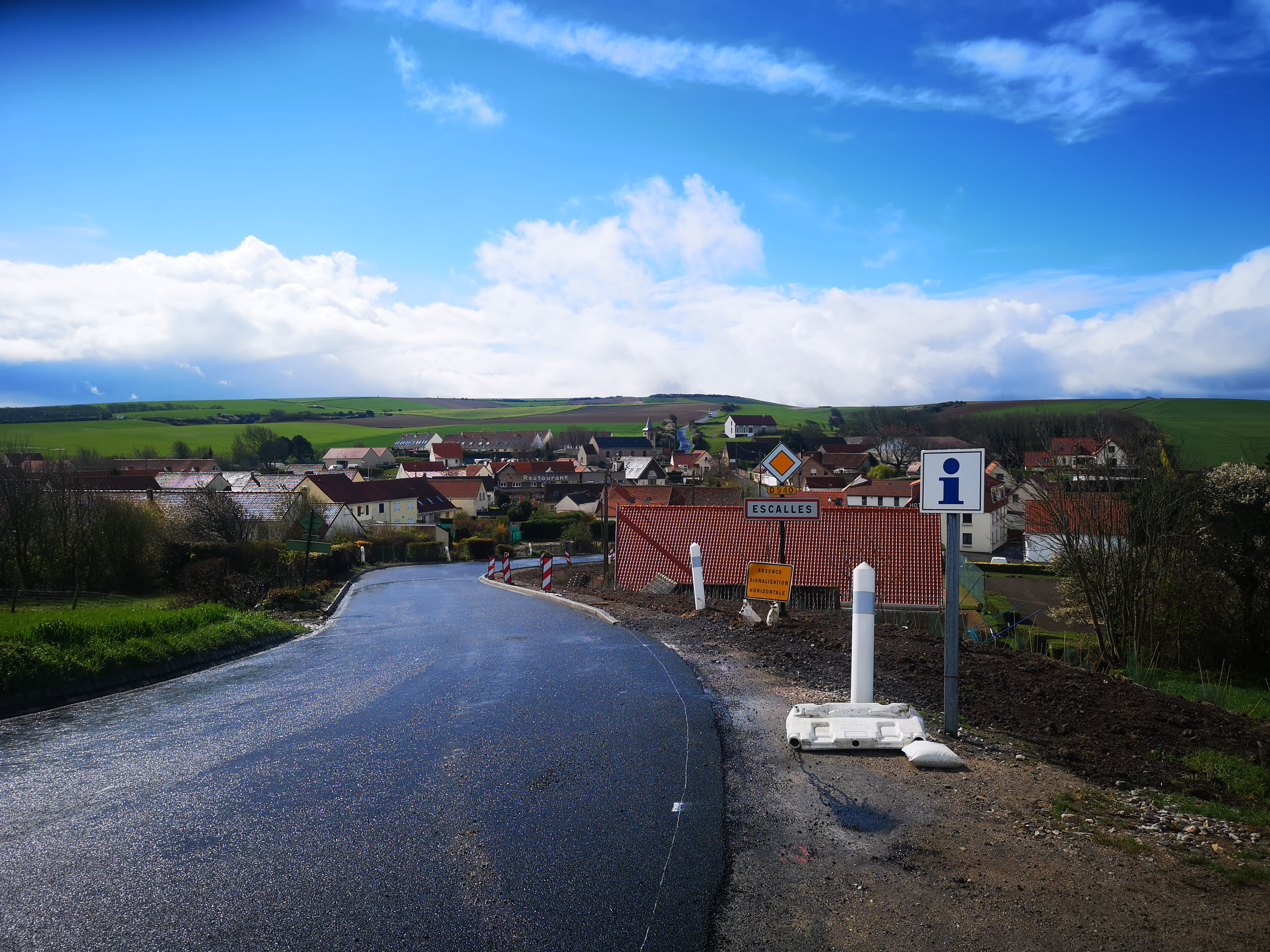

- Coat of arms
- Location of Escalles
- Location within France Location within Hauts-de-France
- Coordinates: 50°55′04″N 1°42′53″E
- Country: France
- Region: Hauts-de-France
- Department: Pas-de-Calais
- Arrondissement: Calais
- Canton: Calais-1
- Intercommunality: CA Grand Calais Terres et Mers

Government
  - Mayor (2020–2026): Marc Boutroy
- Area^{1}: 7.29 km^{2} (2.81 sq mi)
- Elevation: 46 m (151 ft)
- Highest elevation: 154 m (505 ft)
- Lowest elevation: 0 m (0 ft)
- Population (2023): 223
  - Density: 30.6/km^{2} (79.2/sq mi)
- Time zone: UTC+01:00 (CET)
  - Summer (DST): UTC+02:00 (CEST)
- INSEE/Postal code: 62307 /62179
- ^{1} French Land Register data, which excludes lakes, ponds, glaciers > 1 km^{2} (0.386 sq mi or 247 acres) and river estuaries.

Escalles (French pronunciation: [ɛskal]) is a commune in the Pas-de-Calais department in the Hauts-de-France region of France 13 kilometres (8 mi) west of Calais, at the foot of Mont d'Hubert (151 metres (495 ft)).

== Population ==
Historical population
Year	Pop.	±% p.a.
1968	199	—
1975	149	−4.05%
1982	286	+9.76%
1990	320	+1.41%
1999	321	+0.03%
2007	323	+0.08%
2012	281	−2.75%
2017	228	−4.09%
2023	223	−0.37%
Source: INSEE

== Places of interest ==
- The Dover Patrol Monument dedicated to the British and French sailors of World War I is at the summit of Cap Blanc-Nez.

== See also ==
- Communes of the Pas-de-Calais department
