= Marck, Pas-de-Calais =

Marck Mark
- Commune
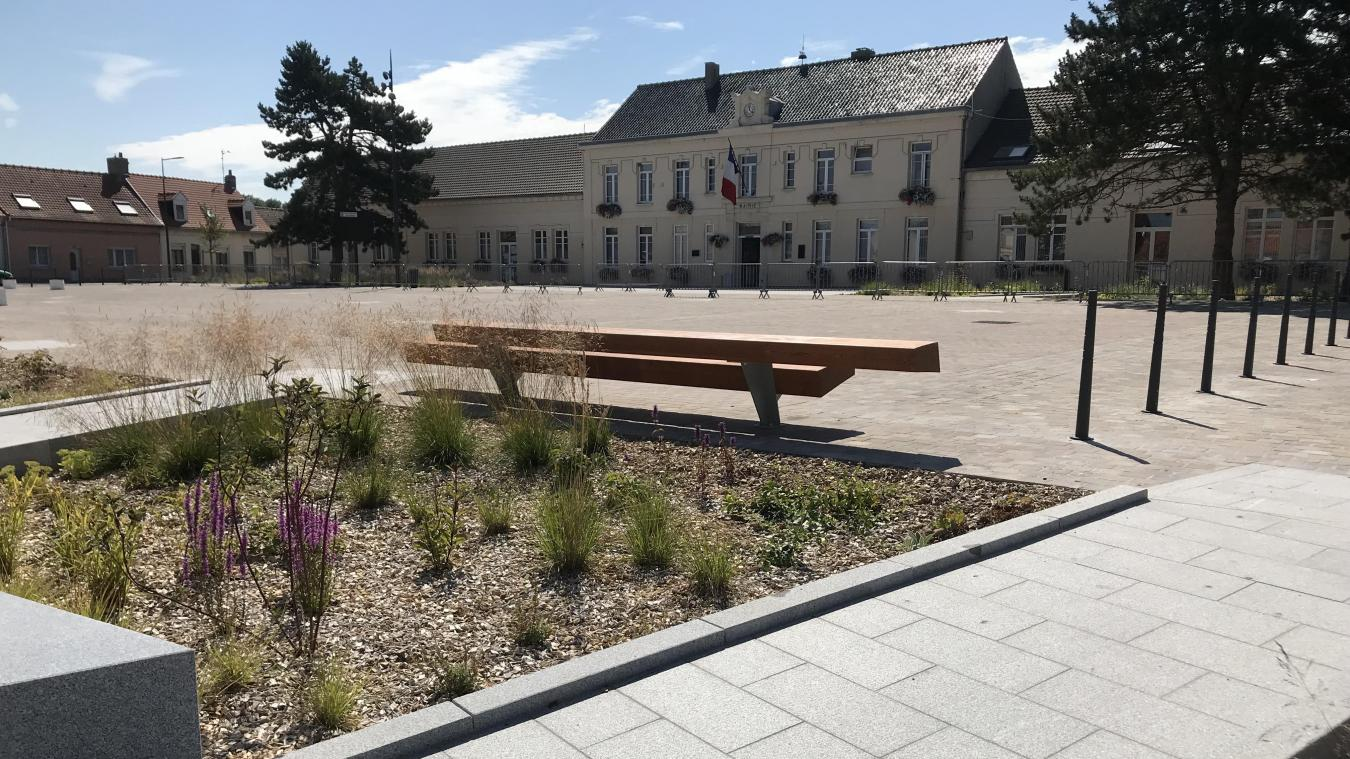
- The centre of Marck

- Coat of arms
- Location of Marck
- Location within France Location within Hauts-de-France
- Coordinates: 50°56′55″N 1°57′03″E
- Country: France
- Region: Hauts-de-France
- Department: Pas-de-Calais
- Arrondissement: Calais
- Canton: Marck
- Intercommunality: CA Grand Calais Terres et Mers

Government
  - Mayor (2020–2026): Corinne Noël
- Area^{1}: 31.55 km^{2} (12.18 sq mi)
- Elevation: 6 m (20 ft)
- Highest elevation: 14 m (46 ft)
- Lowest elevation: 0 m (0 ft)
- Population (2023): 10,467
  - Density: 331.8/km^{2} (859.3/sq mi)
- Time zone: UTC+01:00 (CET)
  - Summer (DST): UTC+02:00 (CEST)
- INSEE/Postal code: 62548 /62730
- ^{1} French Land Register data, which excludes lakes, ponds, glaciers > 1 km^{2} (0.386 sq mi or 247 acres) and river estuaries.

Marck (French pronunciation: [maʁk]; West Flemish: Mark) is a commune in the Pas-de-Calais department in the Hauts-de-France region of France.

== Geography ==
Marck is a farming and light industrial town located 6 km (4 mi) east of Calais, at the junction of the D940 and D248 roads. The A26 autoroute (‘autoroute des Anglais’) passes through the commune. The small villages of Les Hemmes-de-Marck and Fort-Vert, both on the D191 road, are included in the population. Calais–Dunkerque Airport also known as the Louis Blériot airport, and originally known as Calais-Marck, is situated in the commune.

== Politics ==
Pierre-Henri Dumont served as the Mayor from 2014 to 2017. Corinne Noël is the mayor of Marck.

== Demographic evolution ==
Historical population
| Year | Pop. | ±% p.a. |
|---|---|---|
| 1968 | 4,576 | — |
| 1975 | 5,735 | +3.28% |
| 1982 | 7,448 | +3.80% |
| 1990 | 9,069 | +2.49% |
| 1999 | 8,987 | −0.10% |
| 2007 | 9,123 | +0.19% |
| 2012 | 10,175 | +2.21% |
| 2017 | 10,676 | +0.97% |
| 2023 | 10,467 | −0.33% |
Source: INSEE

== History ==
The commune dates to 57 BC, when it was known as Marca, meaning "border". Marck was the site of clashes between the English and the French during the Hundred Years' War, during which the commune came under English control for two centuries.

== Main sights ==
- The church of St. Martin, dating from the twentieth century, is an official historical monument since 17 January 2002. The original church, dated from the 15th century, was destroyed with explosives in 1944 during World War II. The churchyard has two graves of British soldiers who died during World War II.
- There is a headstone placed in memory of those who perished during the bombing of Rue Du Sable in Marck on 28 September 1944 by the Allied Forces. This bombing killed over 30 inhabitants and injured many, the largest Marck had ever faced at one time. This street was subsequently renamed Rue du 28 Septembre in memory of this terrible tragedy.
- Walde's lighthouse, built in 1857 and first lit in 1859, is the last lighthouse in Europe built as a metal structure on stilts. It was automated in 1897 and decommissioned in 1986. Walde's lighthouse was classified as a historic monument in July 2022.
- A memorial dedicated to soldiers and civilians from the commune who died during both World War I and World War II was erected in 1920 in the centre of the town.

== See also ==
- Communes of the Pas-de-Calais department
- AS Marck
