= Sangatte =

Sangatte Zandgat
- Commune
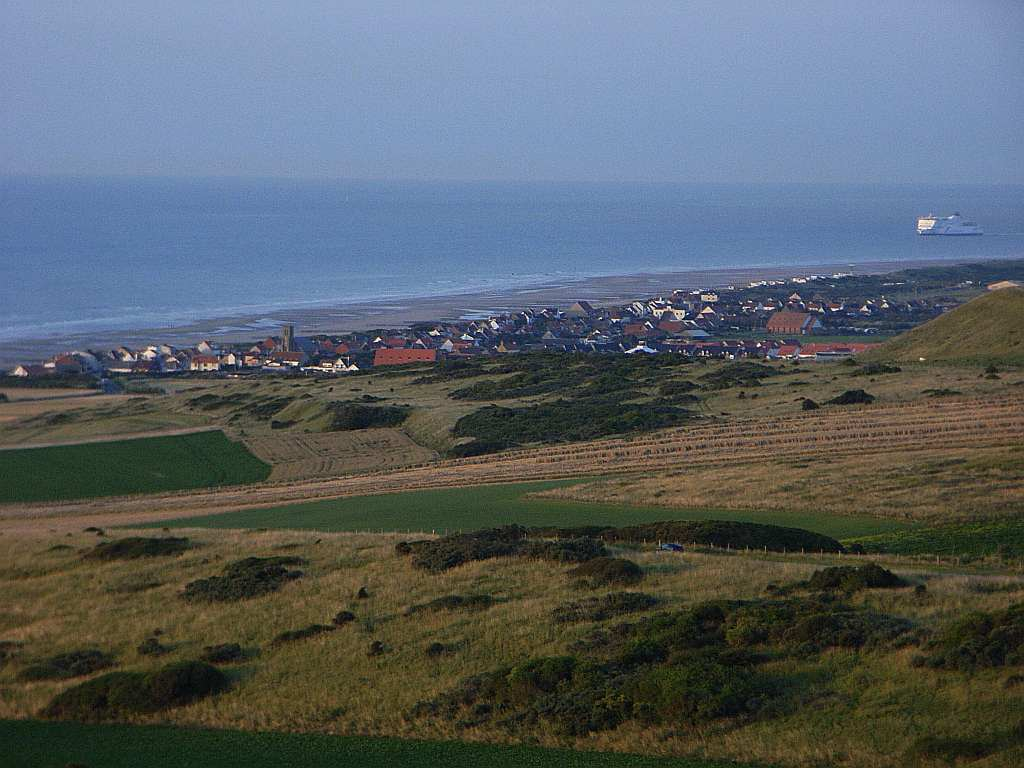
- A general view of Sangatte

- Coat of arms
- Location of Sangatte
- Location within France Location within Hauts-de-France
- Coordinates: 50°56′51″N 1°45′27″E
- Country: France
- Region: Hauts-de-France
- Department: Pas-de-Calais
- Arrondissement: Calais
- Canton: Calais-1
- Intercommunality: CA Grand Calais Terres et Mers

Government
  - Mayor (2026–32): Guy Allemand
- Area^{1}: 14.28 km^{2} (5.51 sq mi)
- Elevation: 4 m (13 ft)
- Highest elevation: 151 m (495 ft)
- Lowest elevation: 0 m (0 ft)
- Population (2023): 4,668
  - Density: 326.9/km^{2} (846.6/sq mi)
- Time zone: UTC+01:00 (CET)
  - Summer (DST): UTC+02:00 (CEST)
- INSEE/Postal code: 62774 /62231
- ^{1} French Land Register data, which excludes lakes, ponds, glaciers > 1 km^{2} (0.386 sq mi or 247 acres) and river estuaries.

Sangatte (French pronunciation: [sɑ̃ɡat]; West Flemish: Zandgat) is a commune in the Pas-de-Calais department on the northern coast of France on the English Channel. The name is of Flemish origin, meaning hole or gap in the sand.

== Engineering ==
Sangatte is the location for the Channel Tunnel's French cooling station, its British counterpart being at Samphire Hoe. In addition, it is the French end-point for the HVDC Cross-Channel, the connection between the UK and French electricity grids.

== History ==
=== First underwater telegraph ===
Sangatte was the landing point of the world's first operational underwater telegraph cable, laid across the Channel by the Submarine Telegraph Company in 1851 between South Foreland and Sangatte.

=== Pioneering cross-Channel flight ===
'Blériot-Plage' is named to commemorate Louis Blériot who, on 25 July 1909, was the first person to fly across the English Channel. He flew from the beach at Sangatte to the White Cliffs of Dover, to claim the prize offered by the Daily Mail. The crossing took 37 minutes in his aeroplane, Blériot XI, built in collaboration with Raymond Saulnier. It was powered by a 3-cylinder 25 horsepower (19 kW) engine.

At the western end of the beach, a statue of the French aviator Hubert Latham overlooks the sea. Latham was another pioneering cross-channel pilot whose earlier attempt on 19 July had failed.

=== Spitfire ===
Sangatte is also the landing location of Supermarine Spitfire Mark 1a N3200 of No. 19 Squadron RAF, which was forced to land at the beach after receiving damage to its radiator from shots fired by a Messerschmitt Bf 109 of JG 2 during Operation Dynamo on 26 May 1940, having shot down a Junkers Ju 87 shortly beforehand to protect the evacuating soldiers at Dunkirk. The plane was recovered from the sand at Sangatte in 1986, and restoration work commenced in 2000, which continued until 2014 when works completed, the aircraft having been repaired to a fully airworthy state.

== Refugee camp ==
Sangatte was the location of a refugee camp set up by the French Red Cross in 1999 as a result of an influx of migrants attempting to travel to the United Kingdom. They were mainly from Afghanistan, Iraq and Kosovo. Under pressure from the UK government, Nicolas Sarkozy (then Minister of the Interior), ordered its closure in 2002. There were riots in 2001 and 2002, the year the camp closed.

== Population ==
Historical population
Year	Pop.	±% p.a.
1968	3,340	—
1975	3,332	−0.03%
1982	3,199	−0.58%
1990	3,326	+0.49%
1999	4,046	+2.20%
2007	4,549	+1.48%
2012	4,719	+0.74%
2017	4,820	+0.42%
2023	4,668	−0.53%
Source: INSEE

== Politics ==
=== Mayor List ===
Period		Identity	Label	Qualifications
Empty data needs to be completed
v. 1959		Jules Boulart		
March 1971	March 1983	René Coucy	DVG	Doctor of medicine
March 1983	March 2001	René Lapôtre	RPR	General Councillor for Calais-Nord-Ouest (1992 → 1998)
March 2001	September 2006	André Segard	PS	Former Inspector of National Education General Councillor for Calais-Nord-Ouest (2004 → 2006) Passed away in service
September 2006	On Going (September 19, 2024)	Guy Allemand	SE	Former company manager and purchasing center manager Vice-president of CA Grand Calais Terres et Mers Reelected for 2014-2020 term,, Reelected for 2020-2026 term,,

== Twin towns ==
- (United Kingdom) Sandgate, Kent, England, UK.

== In popular culture ==
In the BBC Two show Top Gear, the three presenters Jeremy Clarkson, Richard Hammond and James May crossed the Channel in an amphibious Nissan Navara and instead of finishing at Calais after leaving Dover, they ended up 8 kilometres (5.0 mi) along the coast in Sangatte.

== Personalities ==
- The airmen Hubert Latham and Louis Blériot.
- Fabrice Bourré (born in 1962), French footballer, was born in Blériot-Plage.

== See also ==
- Chinese Labour Corps
- Communes of the Pas-de-Calais département
