= Fréthun =

Fréthun Fraaituin
- Commune
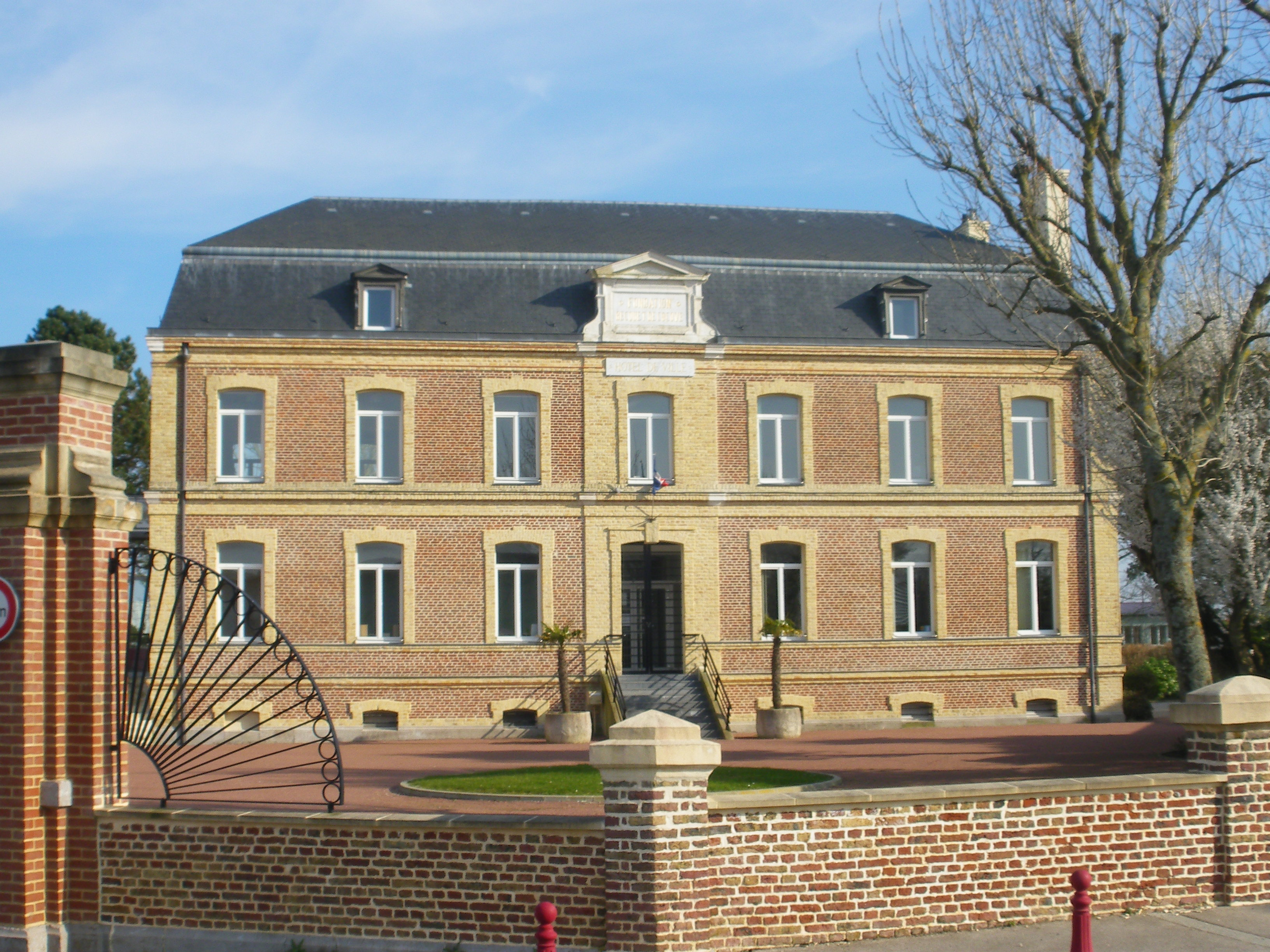
- The town hall of Fréthun

- Coat of arms
- Location of Fréthun
- Location within France Location within Hauts-de-France
- Coordinates: 50°55′03″N 1°49′33″E
- Country: France
- Region: Hauts-de-France
- Department: Pas-de-Calais
- Arrondissement: Calais
- Canton: Calais-1
- Intercommunality: CA Grand Calais Terres et Mers

Government
  - Mayor (2020–2026): Guy Heddebaux
- Area^{1}: 7.92 km^{2} (3.06 sq mi)
- Elevation: 11 m (36 ft)
- Highest elevation: 60 m (200 ft)
- Lowest elevation: 0 m (0 ft)
- Population (2023): 1,403
  - Density: 177/km^{2} (459/sq mi)
- Time zone: UTC+01:00 (CET)
  - Summer (DST): UTC+02:00 (CEST)
- INSEE/Postal code: 62360 /62185
- ^{1} French Land Register data, which excludes lakes, ponds, glaciers > 1 km^{2} (0.386 sq mi or 247 acres) and river estuaries.

Fréthun (French pronunciation: [fʁetœ̃]; West Flemish: Fraaituin) is a commune in the Pas-de-Calais department in the Hauts-de-France region of France 3 miles (5 km) southwest of Calais. It is home to the Calais-Fréthun railway station and the Eurotunnel terminal, linking France with England.

== Population ==
The inhabitants are called Fréthunois in French.

Historical population
Year	Pop.	±% p.a.
1968	864	—
1975	762	−1.78%
1982	1,094	+5.30%
1990	1,169	+0.83%
1999	1,091	−0.76%
2007	1,240	+1.61%
2012	1,166	−1.22%
2017	1,322	+2.54%
2023	1,403	+1.00%
Source: INSEE

== See also ==
- Communes of the Pas-de-Calais department
