= VFL (disambiguation) =

VFL can refer to:

Sport

- Victorian Football League, an Australian rules football league, predecessor of the Australian Football League
- Victorian Football League, an Australian rules football league; formerly the Victorian Football Association, renamed in 1995
- Verein für Leibesübungen
  - VfL-Stadium, a stadium in Wolfburg

Other

- Voies Ferrées des Landes, historic French railway company of Gascony
