= RLE =

RLE may refer to:

- Radical life extension, a study to extend human lifespan
- Rail Logistics Europe, the rail freight and logistics operations division of SNCF
- Real-life experience (transgender), a period of time in which transgender individuals live full-time in their preferred gender role
- Red Line Extension, a rapid transit project in Chicago, Illinois
- Refractive lens exchange, an eye operation
- Research Laboratory of Electronics, an interdisciplinary laboratory at the Massachusetts Institute of Technology
- Right-to-left embedding, in bi-directional text
- Run-length encoding, a form of lossless data compression
