= Captrain Portugal =

Portuguese rail transport company

Captrain Portugal S.A.
- Industry: Rail transport
- Founded: 2006
- Headquarters: Lisbon, Portugal
- Revenue: €14.8 million (2009)
- Number of employees: 100
- Parent: Mota-Engil

Captrain Portugal S.A. (formerly Takargo Rail) is a Portuguese rail transport company. It is presently a subsidiary of the French state-owned railway company SNCF.

It was founded as Takargo Rail during 2006 by the Portuguese conglomerate Mota-Engil. Within two years, the company had started running its own trains, being the first private train operator in Portugal. While it has since been joined by competing rail freight companies, Takargo Rail did not have to deal with an incumbent state-owned rail freight operator, and the nation's use of the Iberian gauge hindered the entrance of competition. During 2009, the joint venture operator Ibercargo Rail was formed by Takargo Rail and the Spanish company COMSA Rail Transport to operate cross-border rail freight services between Spain and Portugal.

During the 2010s, Takargo Rail expanded its inhouse maintenance and training capabilities, secured additional work (including at its Ibercargo Rail joint venture, and found itself competing against new rail freight entrants. In March 2022, RAIL Logistics Europe (RLE), a subsidiary of SNCF, announced its intention to acquire Takargo Rail from Mota-Engil; the deal was approved of by regulators and was completed four months later. The Captrain Portugal S.A. was adopted on 1 January 2024.

== History ==
The company was founded as Takargo Rail in 2006 by the Portuguese conglomerate Mota-Engil. During May 2008, Takargo Rail was awarded a safety certificate, permitting operators to commence; later that same year, the company operated its first trains, making the company the first private train operator in Portugal. Unlike most European countries, Portugal did not have a state-owned rail freight operator with which to compete; the nation's railways being largely built to the Iberian gauge of 1,668mm also served to hinder the entry of competing rail companies. Early on, Takargo Rail focused on the rail freight sector, specifically the haulage of both maritime intermodal containers and bulk freights (aggregates, metals, raw materials).

During 2009, the joint venture operator Ibercargo Rail was formed by Takargo Rail and the Spanish company COMSA Rail Transport; it focused on rail freight operations between Spain and Portugal. Ibercargo Rail ran its first cross-border freight service in October 2010.

Throughout the 2010s, Ibercargo Rail's activities expanded. In October 2013, it was announced that the joint venture would manage a new intermodal service between Porto and Tarragona on behalf of the French freight operator Geodis and the Portuguese logistics provider SPC. During early 2017, Ibercargo Rail started transporting vehicles built by Renault from Spain to Portugal on behalf of the Spanish National Railways subsidiary Pecovasa. These trains, which comprised Pecovasa wagons hauled by Vossloh Euro 4000 locomotives, were typically ran twice per month, but could vary based on customer requirements.

In June 2014, Takargo Rail became a certified responsible entity for the maintenance of its wagons. Additional certifications across the company's operational spectrum were secured during the 2010s and early 2020s, enabling it to, amongst other things, directly undertake the training of its drivers and certify its safety management system as well.

By late 2018, the arrival of new private sector competitors, such as the Swiss-owned Medway, in Portugal's rail freight sector had overtaken Takargo Rail's marketshare.

In March 2022, RAIL Logistics Europe (RLE), a subsidiary of the French state-owned railway company SNCF, announced its intention to acquire Takargo Rail from Mota-Engil. The purchase required the approval of regulatoratory bodies due to its potential impact on competition. Four months later, the acquisition was finalised. On 1 January 2024, Takargo Rail was rebranded as Captrain Portugal S.A. to clearly indicate its ownership and to align its branding with that of its new parent company.

== Rolling stock ==
As of 2009, the Takargo locomotive fleet includes seven Euro 4000 locomotives (Portuguese class 6000), and two Portuguese class 1400 diesel locomotives.

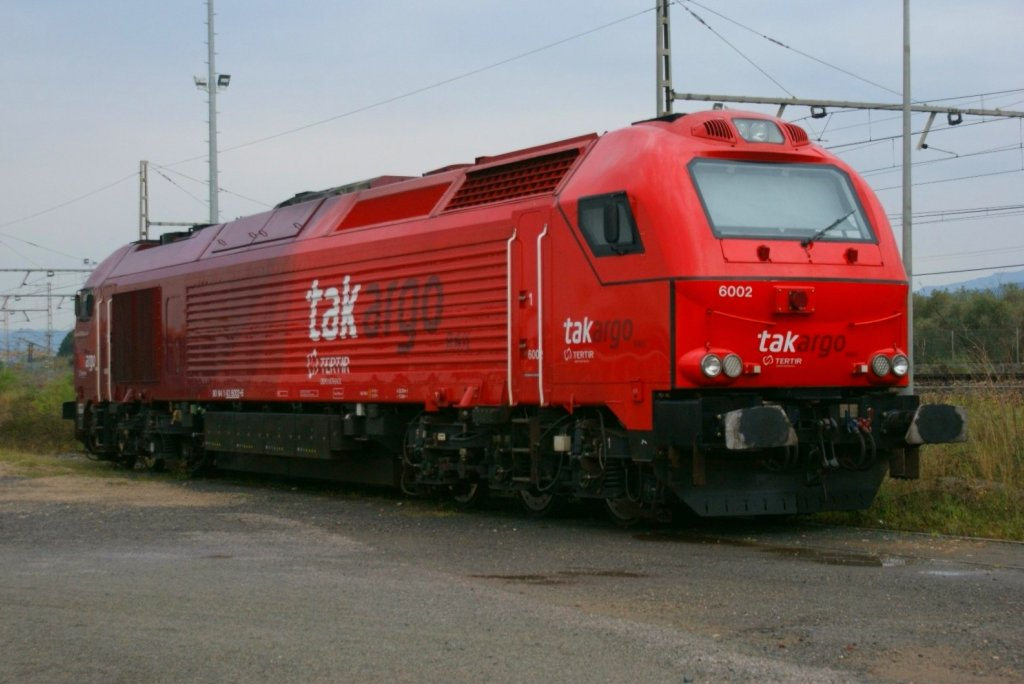
Euro 4000 (Class 6000) (April 2010)

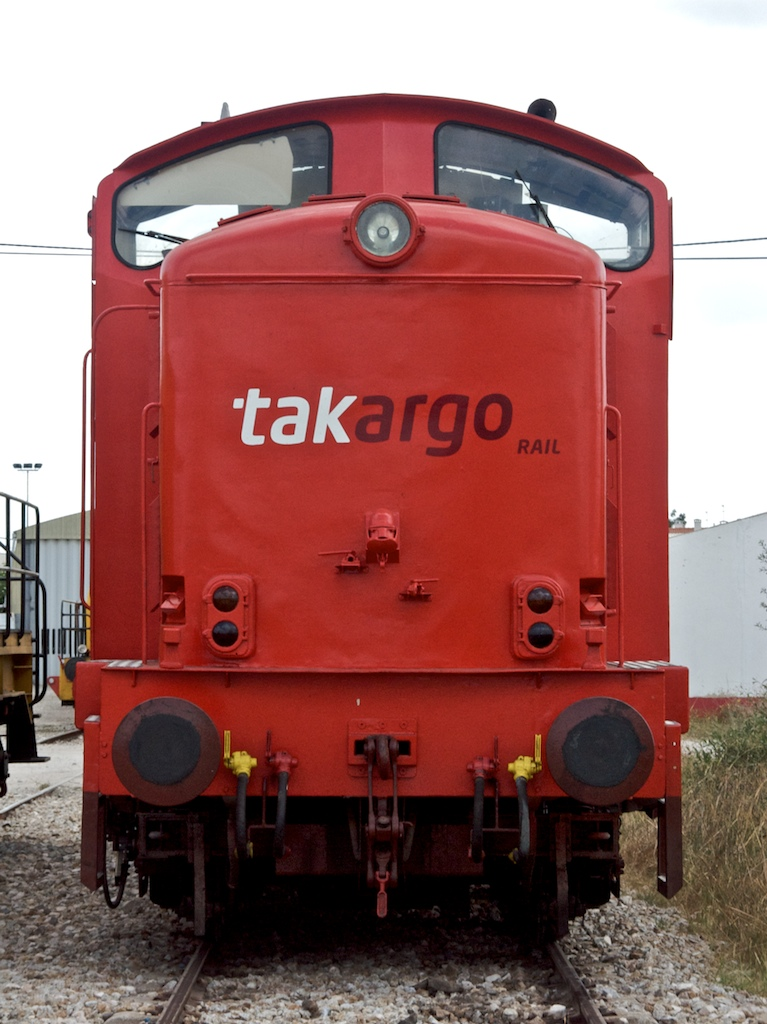
Class 1400, number 1449 (August 2008)
