= Captrain España =

Spanish rail transport company

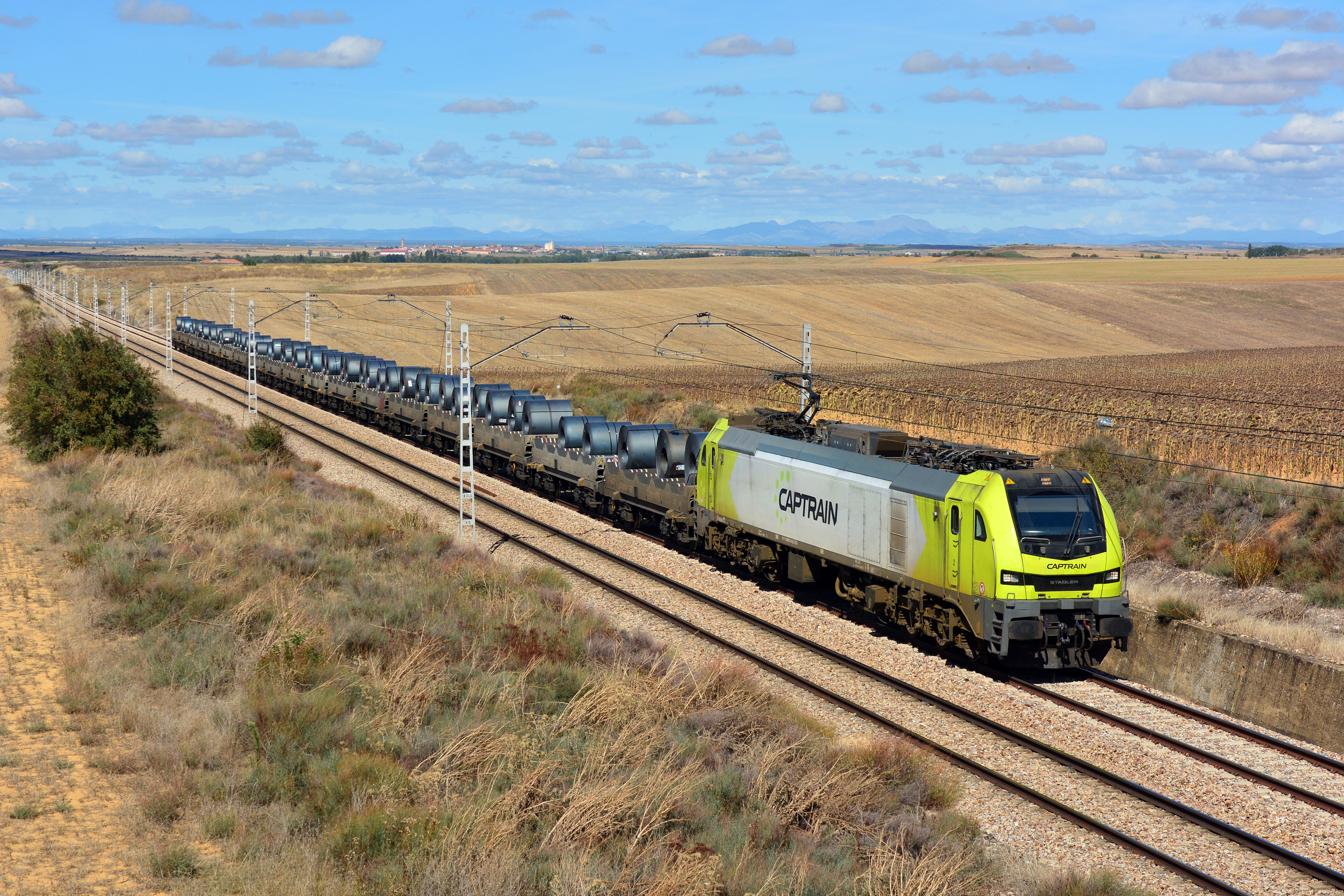
- Captrain Stadler Euro6000
- Industry: Rail transport
- Founded: 2002
- Headquarters: Barcelona, Spain
- Services: Rail freight, locomotive hire
- Revenue: €19million (2009)
- Number of employees: ~240 (2009)
- Parent: Rail Logistics Europe (SNCF)

Captrain España is a subsidiary of SNCF, created in 2002 to provide comprehensive logistics services, rail freight, and passenger services. It was founded as COMSA Rail Transport and rebranded as Captrain España in 2018.

== History ==
COMSA Rail Transport was founded in 2002 by COMSA to provide rail services, including freight, passenger and construction trains, locomotive hire for rail construction and other related services including sidings and terminals.

In September 2005 COMSA became the first private rail company to obtain a license to operate on the Spanish railway network, in 2007 a safety certificate for operations was obtained and the company began operating freight trains in 2007. The company became part of the COMSA EMTE group on the merger in July 2009 of Grupo COMSA and Emte SA.

In 2009 the company operated over 1000 freight trains, including 375 automotive part trains for SEAT in Martorell, and coal trains from sea ports to a power plant in Ponferrada, as well as supply locomotives for the construction of the Madrid–Levante high-speed rail line.

In 2013 SNCF Logistics purchased a 25% share in COMSA Rail Transport. In July 2018, SNCF Logistics purchased the remaining 75% with the business to be rebranded Captrain España.

== International cooperation ==
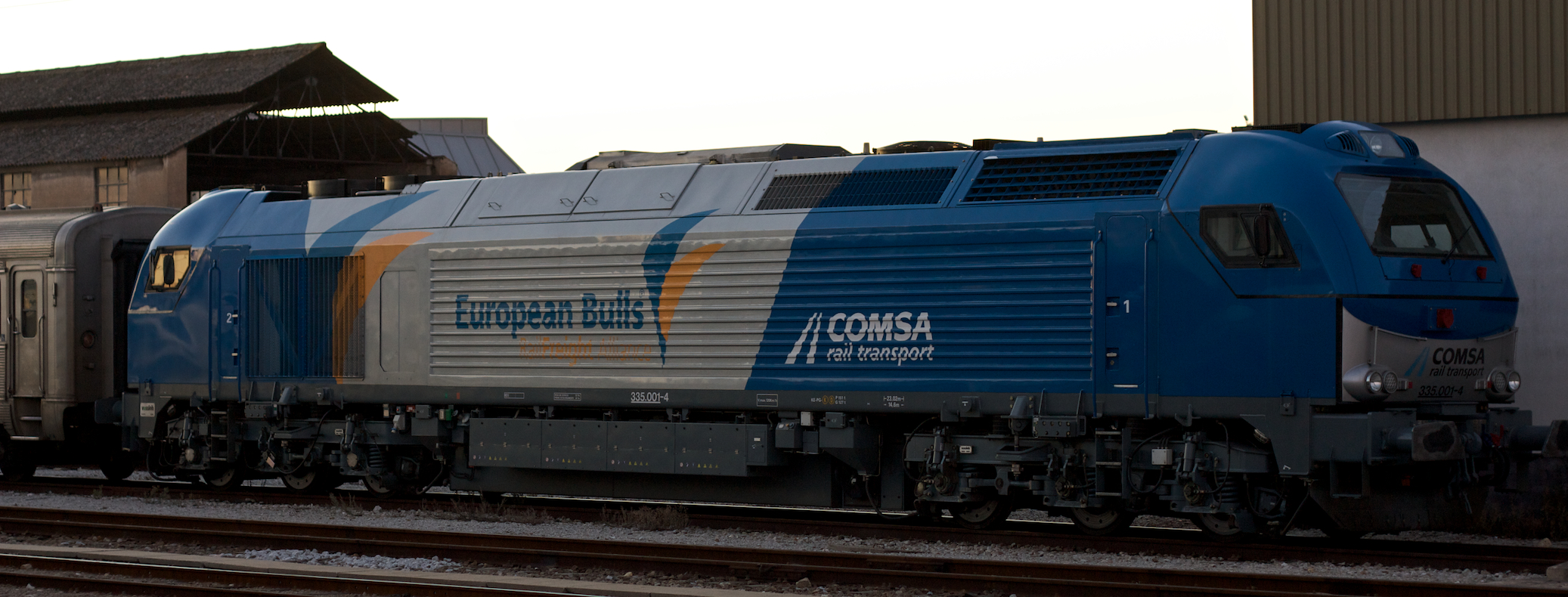
Locomotive 335-001 of COMSA Rail Transport marked European Bulls

- 2005: Founding member of the (now defunct) European Bulls International Railfreight Alliance
- 2006: fer Polska Joint venture with Rail4Chem
- 2009: In association with Portuguese rail company Takargo Rail a joint venture Ibercargo Rail operates services between Spain and Portugal.
- 2013: SNCF-Geodis and COMSA Rail Transport sign a cooperation agreement on developing rail freight between Iberia, France, and Central Europe.

== Rolling stock ==
As of 2009 the company operates three Class 335 Euro 4000, two Class 317 G1700 and two Class 312 MZ III locomotives (ex-DSB MZ (Note: Numbers 312-301 and 312-302, formerly DSB MZ 1436 and DSB MZ 1442)) diesel locomotives, and 18 Electroputere LDE2100 diesel locomotives. Three Class 253 TRAXX DC locomotives were also delivery in October 2009.

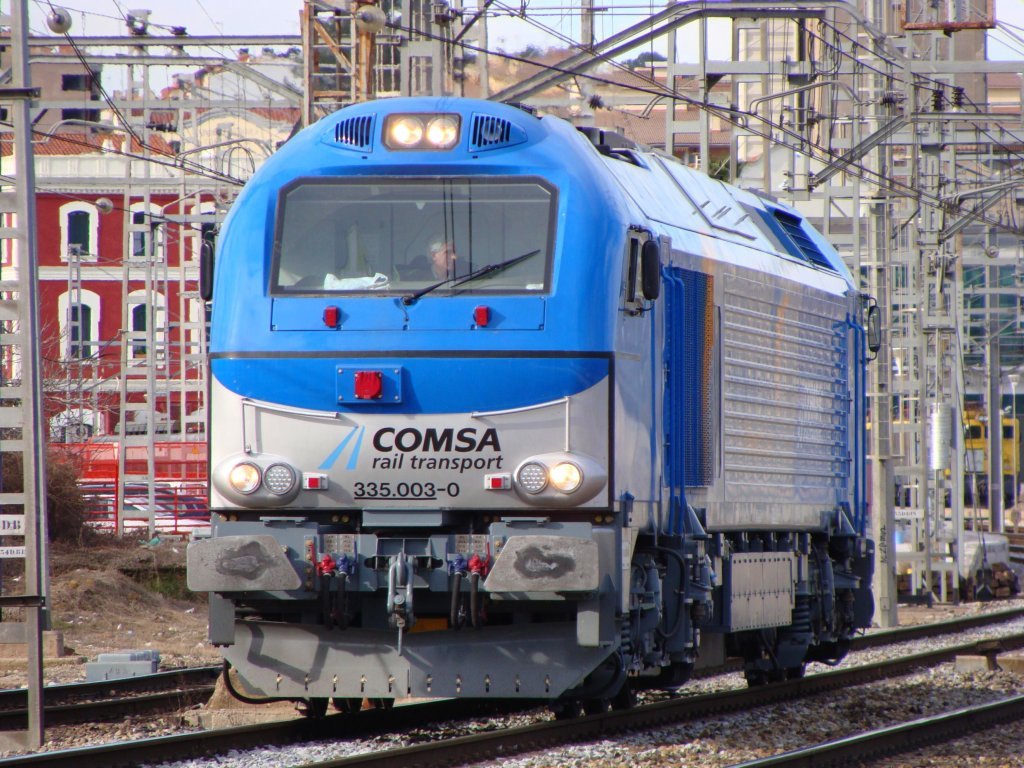
Locomotive 335-003 (Euro 4000) of COMSA Rail Transport (2009)

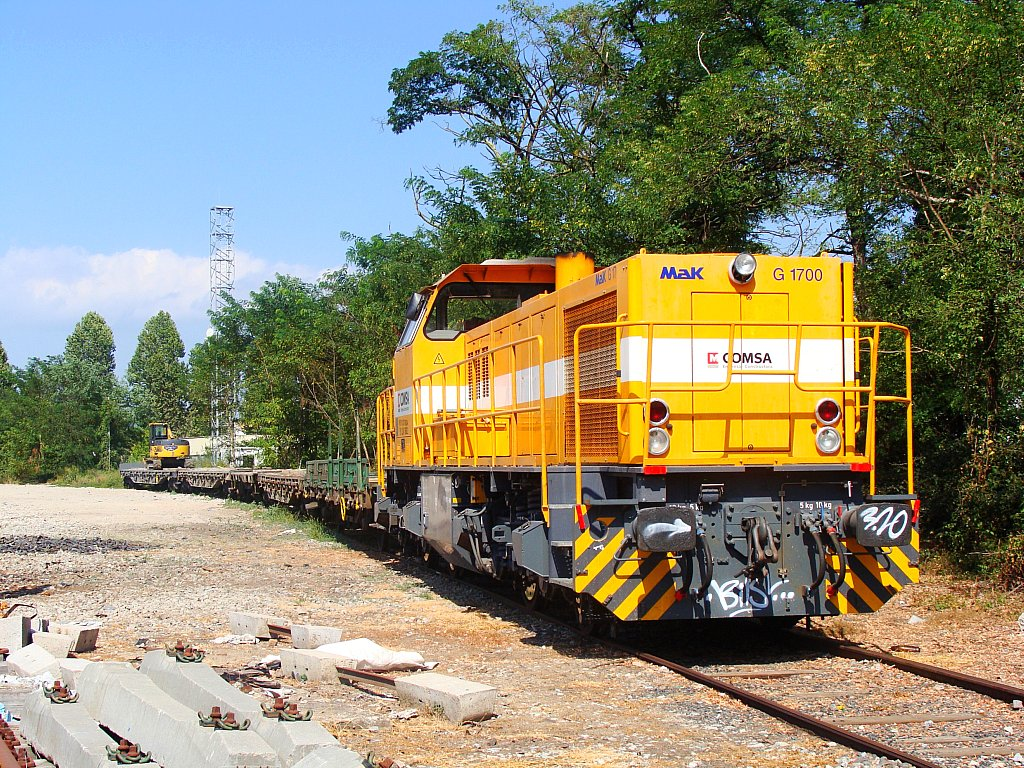
COMSA class 317 locomotive in Caldes de Malavella train station (2010)

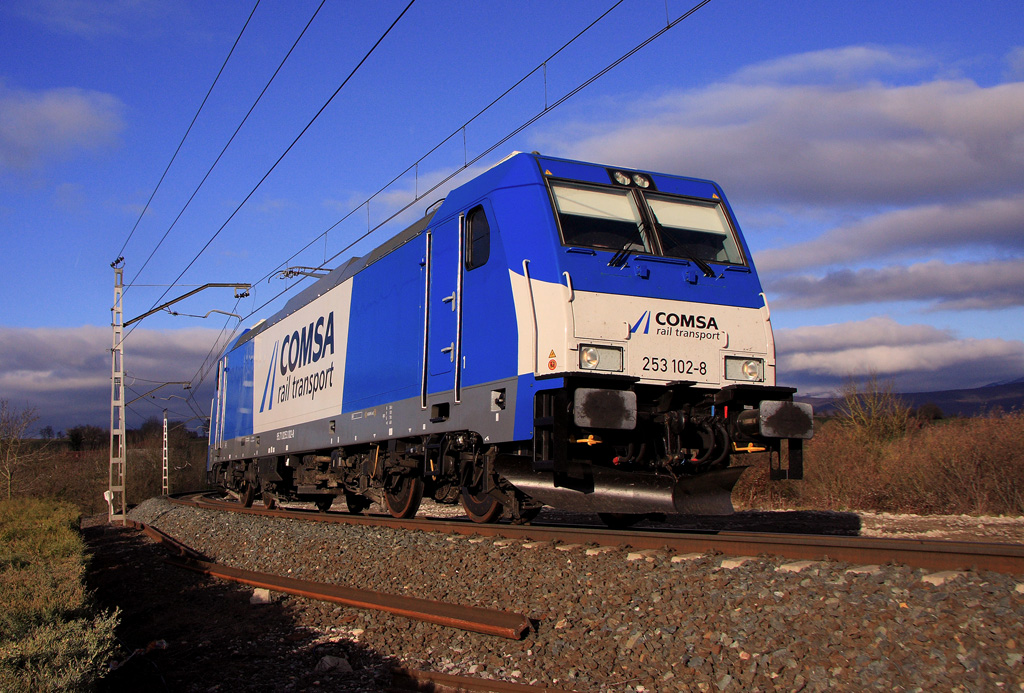
Class 253/Bombardier TRAXX F140 DC locomotive (2011)

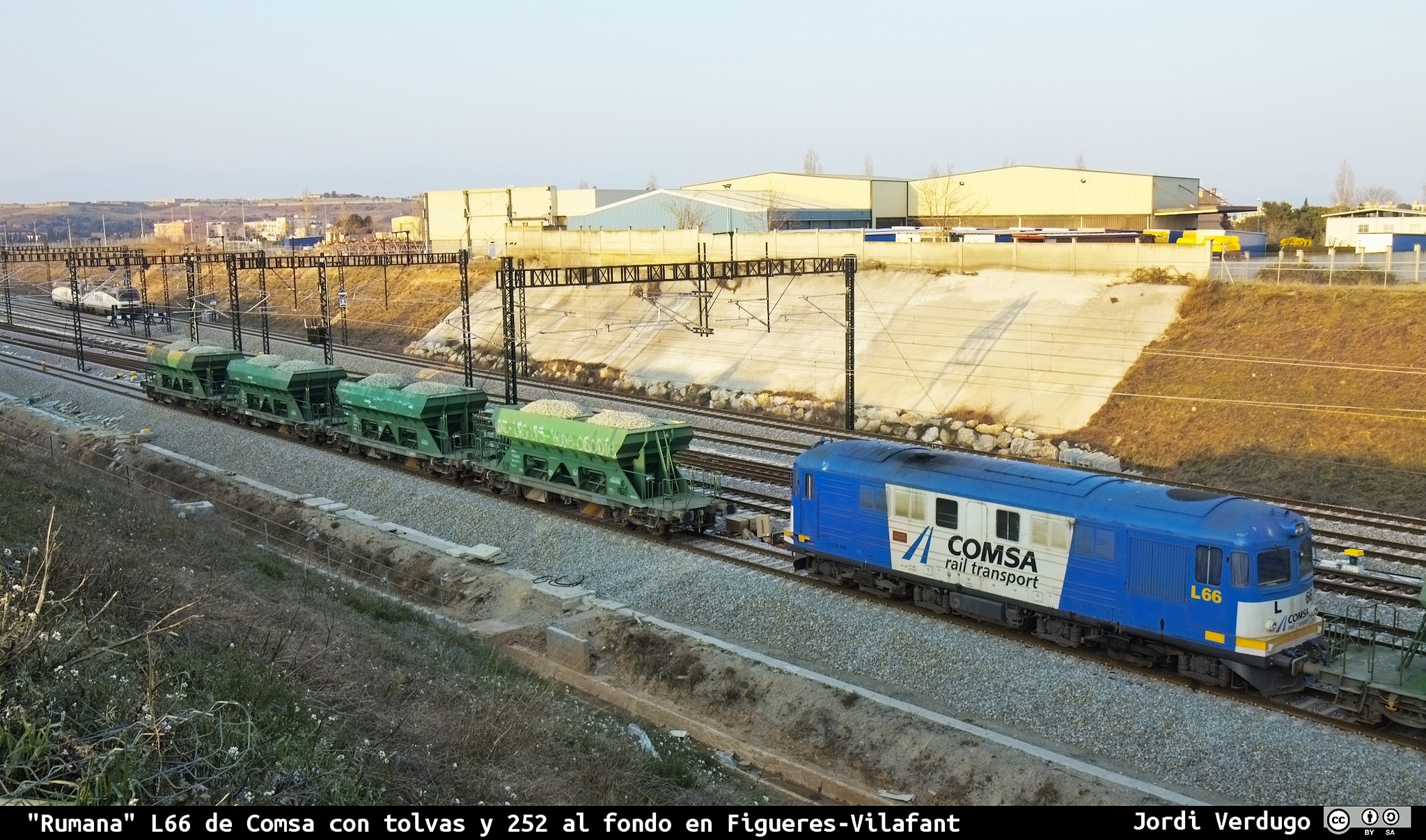
Electroputere LDE2100 diesel electric type with ballast wagons (2012)

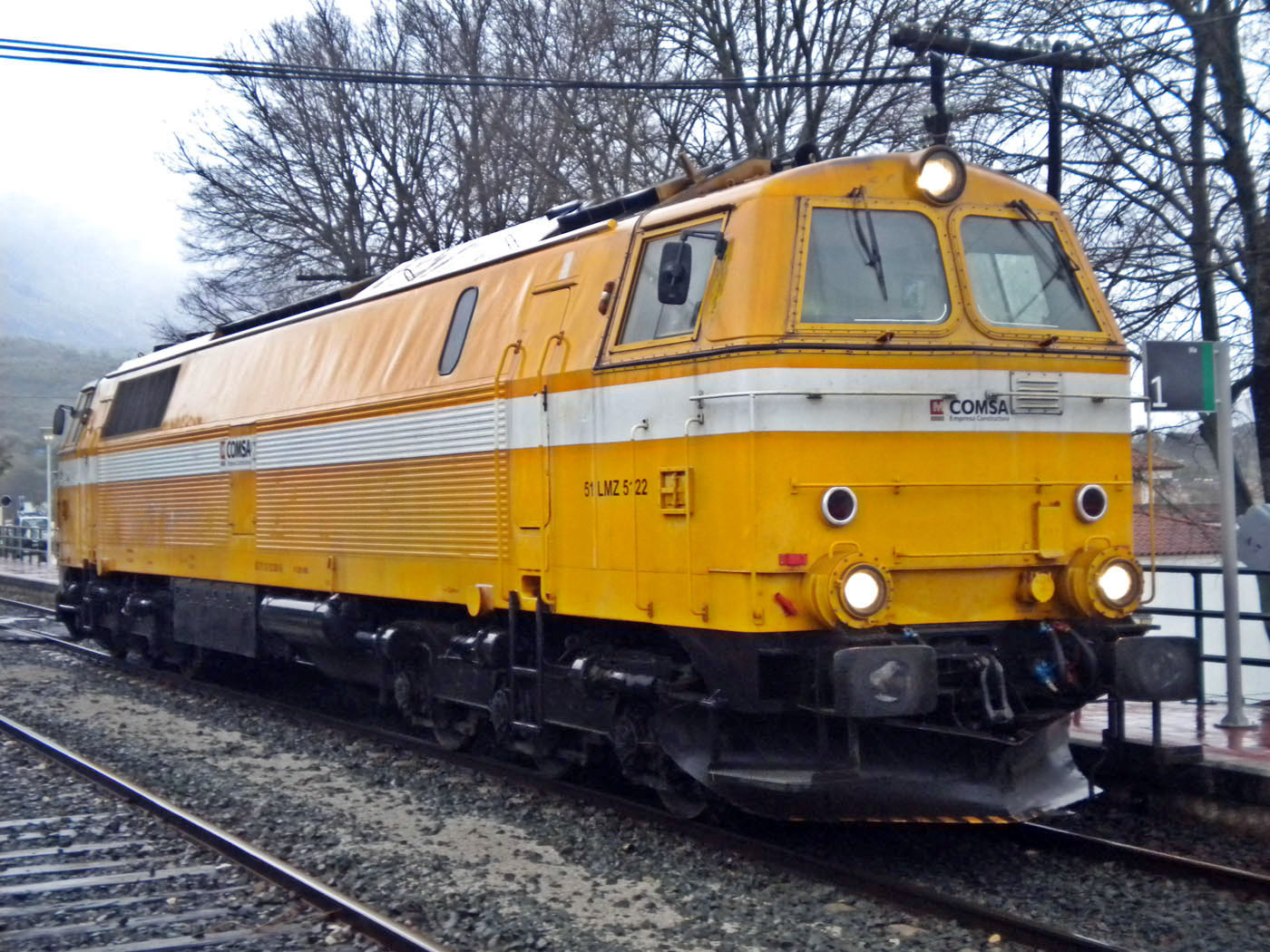
ex-DSB Class MZ diesel electric (2009)
