= Geodis =

French multinational in transport and logistics

Geodis S.A.

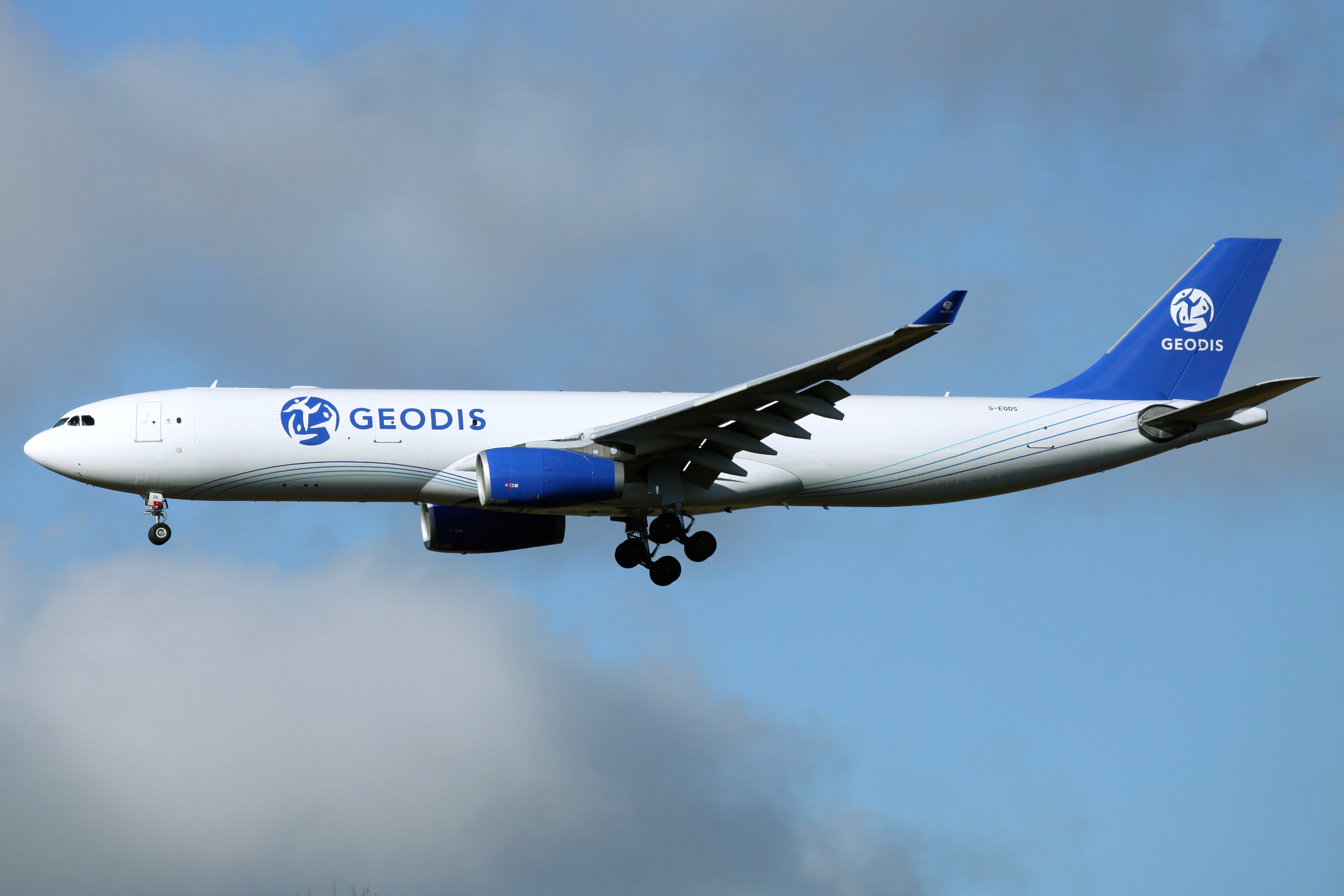
- Titan Airways Airbus A330-300P2F operated in Geodis-livery, in the United Kingdom.
- Company type: Private (Société Anonyme)
- Industry: Supply chain management; Transportation; Logistics
- Predecessor: Compagnie Générale Calberson (1904–1995)
- Founded: 1904; 122 years ago in Le Havre, France
- Founder: Émile Calberson, Guy Crescent
- Headquarters: Levallois-Perret, France
- Area served: Global
- Key people: Marie-Christine Lombard (CEO)
- Revenue: ▲11.3 billion euros (2024)
- Owner: SNCF (100 %)
- Number of employees: 53,000
- Parent: SNCF Group (2020–); SNCF Logistics (2015–2020); SNCF Geodis (2006–2015)
- Subsidiaries: Geodis USA, Geodis BM, Geodis Calberson, Geodis Logistics, Geodis Wilson
- Website: https://geodis.com/

Geodis S.A. is a French multinational grouping together logistics, parcel and road haulage companies in full and part loads, and freight forwarding with the acquisition of TNT's Freight Forwarding division (TFM). It employs 53,000 people and is present in 166 countries. Its Chairwoman is Marie-Christine Lombard. Its head office is in Levallois-Perret, in the Greater Paris area. Its American subsidiary, Geodis USA Inc., is based in Nashville, Tennessee, where the Geodis Park soccer stadium is also located.

Geodis S.A. is a 100% subsidiary of SNCF. It was one of the main subsidiaries of the SNCF Logistics division, which grouped together the SNCF group's road and rail freight transport and logistics activities, from 2008 to 2020. In 2020, SNCF Logisitics split into three companies: Geodis Group, Ermewa (sold to CDPQ) and Rail Logistics Europe.

== History ==
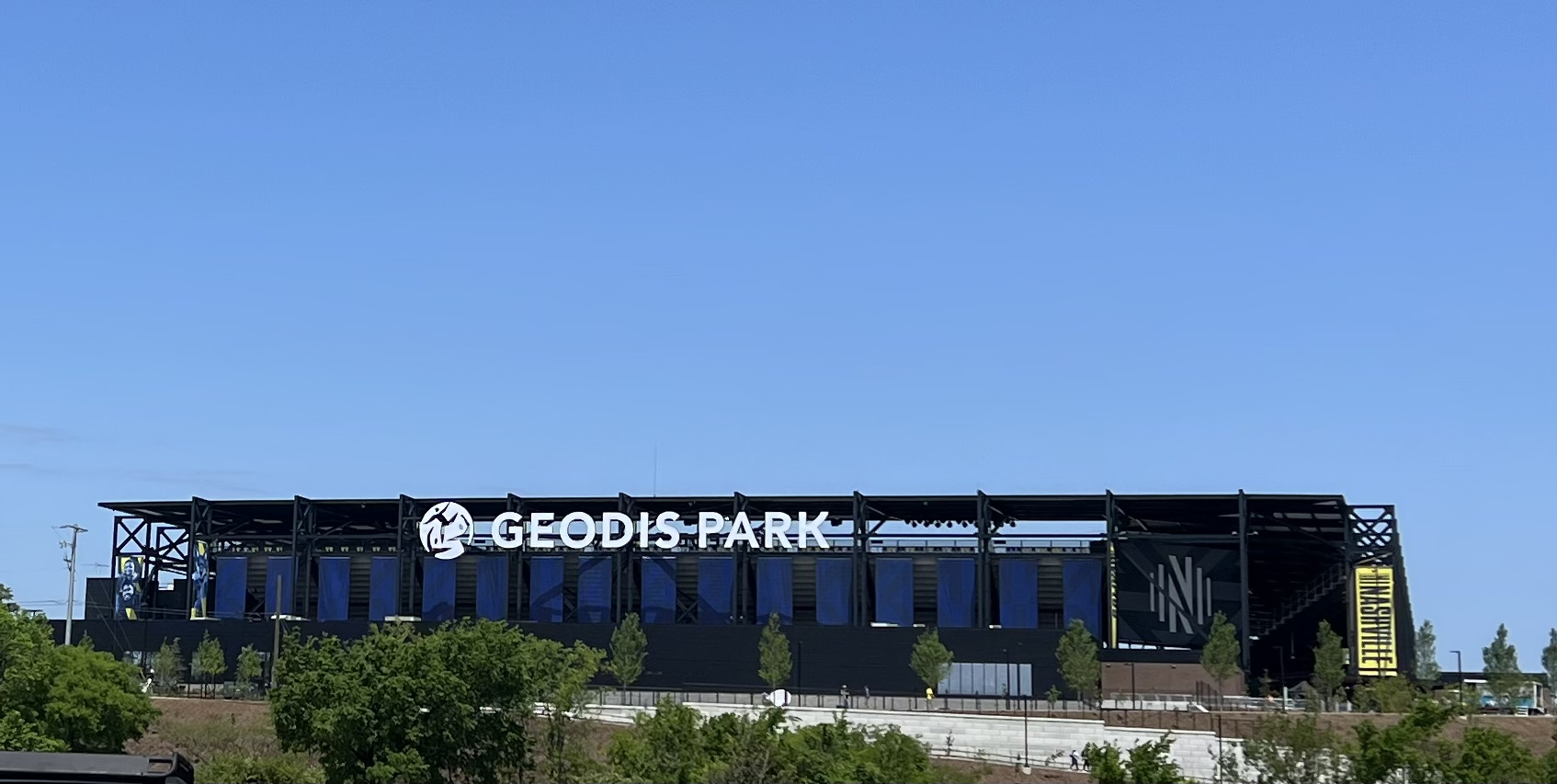
South facade of Geodis Park in Nashville, Tennessee.

In 1904, Transports Rapides Calberson was created in Le Havre, renamed Société des Transports Routiers Calberson in 1920.

On December 20, 1995, Compagnie Générale Calberson absorbed Bourgey Montreuil (BM), SCETA Transport and SCETA International, adopting the new name Geodis Group.

In June 1996, SNCF announced that it was reducing its stake in Geodis from 72% to 42%. By decree of August 20, 1996, the group was privatized. It was then restructured into four divisions: Logistics, Overseas, Parcel Delivery and Road haulage.

In April 2008, SNCF launched its first takeover bid to acquire Geodis in its entirety (it held 42.37% at the time).

In December 2008, Geodis acquired IBM Global Logistics, IBM's global logistics management platform. At the same time, IBM signed a long-term contract with Geodis, worth one billion euros a year, to provide logistics services for the American giant.

In summer 2012, Marie-Christine Lombard, then head of Dutch express group TNT Express, was approached by SNCF. In October 2012, she was appointed CEO of Geodis. She replaces Jean-Louis Demeulenaere, who between 2008 and 2012 made a series of acquisitions that enabled the group to expand internationally, broaden its service offering and grow sales, notably through the acquisition of IBM's logistics management platform, and creating to the group's fifth business line, Geodis Supply Chain Optimisation.

In August 2015, Geodis acquired the US logistics company Ozburn-Hessey Logistics, with sales of $1.2 billion and 8,000 employees, for around $800 million.

In October 2020, SNCF Logistics, the parent company of Geodis, completed the acquisition of Pekaes, a Polish company with 200 employees, 20 local branches, 3 rail terminals and 6 logistics warehouses.

As of January 7, 2022, despite the consequences of the COVID-19 pandemic on its accounts, SNCF still considered external growth operations. At the end of January, at its last Board of Directors meeting, SNCF indicated that it was a candidate to acquire the American freight forwarder Pilot Freight Services, positioned mainly in road haulage.

In May 2022, Geodis strengthens its position in the logistics and e-commerce sectors in South-East Asia by acquiring Singapore's Keppel Logistics for 53 million euros.

In August 2022, Geodis acquired the US express transport company Need It Now Delivers in order to increase its presence in the US road freight market. In March 2023, Geodis acquired German carrier Trans-o-flex.

== Activities ==
Geodis groups together 5 main activities:

- Freight forwarding: international transport commissions by sea, air, road and rail, including customs operations. Freight Forwarding also carries out out-of-gauge operations for the oil, gas and mining sectors, etc. (Geodis Calberson, Geodis Walbaum, Geodis MG Transports, Geodis Bernis, Geodis Dusolier, Girault)
- Contract Logistics: management of warehouses and distribution centers, order preparation, deliveries to industrial production lines, inventory and total stock visibility (Geodis Vitesse, Geodis Logistics).
- Distribution & Express: express and parcel delivery solutions in France (last-mile delivery in 1 to 2 days) and Europe for businesses and private customers (France Express, Geodis Wilson, Geodis Cavewood, Geodis Gordon Leslie, Pan European Transport, United Carriers Group, Fortec Distribution Network, Geodis Logistics Vitesse, Geodis Overseas).
- Road transport: full-load and part-load road transport solutions in Europe, notably for mass retail and chemical, industrial and automotive products (Geodis BM).
- Supply chain optimization: consulting services to optimize supply and distribution chains (diagnostics, network design, supply management, flow control, etc.).

== Notes and references ==
1. profile via societe.com
2. "About us | GEODIS".
3. "Geodis détaille sa méthode pour résister au retournement du marché". Les Echos (in French). 2022-08-31.
4. "À propos". GEODIS France (in French).
5. "Geodis mise sur l'innovation pour accélérer sa croissance". Les Echos (in French). 2018-10-10.
6. "Archives nationales du monde du travail". 143.126.211.8 (in French).
7. Silbert, Nathalie (18 June 1996). "La SNCF s'apprête à se désengager de sa filiale routière Géodis". Les Échos.
8. Nouvelle, L'Usine (1996-06-27). "Restructuration de capital : La SNCF ne contrôlera plus directement Géodis". L'Usine Nouvelle (in French).
9. Nouvelle, L'Usine (1996-06-27). "Restructuration de capital : La SNCF ne contrôlera plus directement Géodis". L'Usine Nouvelle (in French).
10. "La SNCF rachète Geodis pour devenir "un champion européen" de la logistique". ladepeche.fr (in French).
11. "Geodis déleste IBM de sa plate-forme logistique mondiale pour 300 M Euros". Capital Finance (in French). 2008-12-15. Archived from the original on 2024-02-24.
12. wpengine (2008-12-04). "Geodis acquires IBM's global logistics operations". Logistics Manager.
13. "IBM Canada Turns to DHL for Service Parts Logistics". Material Handling and Logistics. 2010-05-27.
14. "Le français Geodis met la main sur OHL et se renforce aux Etats-Unis". www.latribune.fr (in French). 2015-08-17.
15. Geodis se renforce aux États-Unis avec l'acquisition d'OHL, Lionel Steimann, Les Échos, 17 août 2015
16. "Geodis se renforce en Pologne avec Pekaes". Capital Finance (in French). 2020-10-20.
17. "SNCF veut grossir dans le transport routier". Le Figaro (in French). 2022-02-07.
18. "Geodis renforce sa présence à Singapour". CFNEWS (in French). May 4, 2022.
19. "Geodis renforce sa présence à Singapour". CFNEWS (in French). May 4, 2022.
20. ROUSSARD, Olivier. "Geodis achève le processus de rachat du transporteur allemand Trans-o-flex". Voxlog (in French).
21. "Qui sommes-nous ?". GEODIS France (in French).
22. "Geodis en croissance de +28%, tirée par le Freight Forwarding et l'e-commerce". www.supplychainmagazine.fr (in French).
23. COUSIN, Charlotte. "En Suède, Geodis développe des activités de logistique contractuelle". Voxlog (in French).
24. Gatti, Marie (2022-01-27). "GEODIS Road Transport obtient le trophée EVE 2021 de la meilleure progression pour la réduction des émissions de CO2 des commissionnaires de transport". Programme EVE (in French).

== See also ==
- SNCF Logistics
