= SNCF Logistics =

Logistics company

- Industry: Transport and logistics
- Founded: 2008; 18 years ago as SNCF Geodis
- Defunct: 31 December 2019
- Successor: Geodis; Rail Logistics Europe; Ermewa
- Headquarters: Levallois-Perret, France
- Area served: Global
- Key people: Alain Picard (CEO); Fret SNCF : Sylvie Charles
- Owner: SNCF
- Parent: SNCF
- Divisions: Geodis, Fret SNCF, Captrain, Captrain France, Naviland Cargo

SNCF Logistics was the division of the SNCF group responsible for freight transportation and logistics.

The division included the activities of: Geodis (and subsidiaries), general land transport and logistics; Fret SNCF the national rail freight operator as well as Captrain France (short haul freight), Captrain, (international rail freight), combining the former Fret SNCF and operations acquired from Veolia Cargo; rail vehicle leasing operations such as Ermewa, France Wagons, Akiem and Transengrais; and the automobile transportation company STVA.

SNCF Logistics was a state-owned enterprise, classified as an Établissement Public à Caractère Industriel et Commercial (EPIC). On 1 January 2020, SNCF founded Rail Logistics Europe where all its freight services were incorporated, while Geodis was separated as an independently operated subsidiary.

== History ==
In 2008, Geodis joined SNCF’s new Transport and Logistics division following a takeover by its major shareholder. That same year, on the basis of a long-term contract Geodis acquires IBM Global Logistics, IBM's global logistics flow management platform, giving rise to the Group's fifth business: Geodis Supply Chain Optimization. In 2009, Geodis continues its program of external growth with the acquisition of two of the four divisions of Giraud International: the Iron and Steel business and the Central and Eastern European Area business.

In 2012, Marie-Christine Lombard joined as chief executive officer.

In 2015, Geodis acquired OHL (Ozburn-Hessey Logistics) and enhanced its freight forwarding and contract logistics offerings in the US.

In 2021, following significant air-freight capacity shortages due to the COVID-19 pandemic, Geodis leased an Airbus A330-300 converted freighter for Geodis Air Network. The aircraft is operated by Titan Airways and is to fly between Amsterdam, London, Chicago and Hong Kong.

=== Background ===
==== Calberson ====
The origins of the logistics company Calberson date back to 1904 when Emile Calberson founded a courier business in Le Havre transferring to and on the rail network, by 1910 his company had expanded to serve the entire Paris-Rouen-Le Havre railway line. In 1925 the company incorporates, becoming the Société des Transports Rapides Calberson. In 1932 France Domicile Transport (FTD) acquires a majority share in the company, and it becomes Société Nouvelle des Transports Rapides Calberson (SNTR). In 1955 it is acquired by the SNCF road transport subsidiary Sceta. With state backing the company expanded, acquiring Schenker France in 1966, and beginning overseas operations. In 1984 the company, as Compagnie Générale Calberson (CGC) had its shares publicly offered on the Paris stock exchange.

==== Geodis ====
In 1995 Calberson, along with its overseas operations, as well as the company Bourgey-Montreuil, and other non-rail freight businesses of SNCF-Sceta, were combined into Compagnie Générale Calberson which was renamed as Geodis. The Geodis group was subsequently privatised in 1996.

In 1997 Tailleur Industrie was acquired, in 2000 the express delivery service Extand was sold to the UK Post Office, and had acquired the cargo operations of the Italian firm Züst Ambrosetti by the end of the year. A partnership with the German air and sea freight firm Rohde & Liesenfeld begins in 2002 leading to its acquisition and incorporation into the subsidiary Geodis Wilson in 2008. Additionally the group begins to handle forwarding for FedEx in France in 2006 and takes over the freight management activities of TNT (formerly known as Wilson Logistics prior to TNT acquisition in the same year. The company became Geodis Wilson in 2007.

In April 2008 SNCF made an offer for 57% of the shares in Geodis, (having originally had a 43% stake) at 462 million euros, thus taking control of the company and effectively re-nationalising an organisation that had been privatised twelve years earlier. The bid was authorised by the French stock market regulator AMF (Autorité des marchés financiers) in May.

=== SNCF Geodis ===
Following the acquisition of Geodis SNCF Geodis became the name of the corporate division of SNCF for all freight and logistics, both internal and international, including non-rail activities.

In March 2009 the Geodis take-over of IBM's Global Logistics company first announced in December 2008 was finalised., additionally as part of the purchase deal of the logistics business Geodis became the sole logistics supplier for IBM with a multi-year contract.

In September 2009 Veolia Cargo was acquired by SNCF and Eurotunnel, the business units acquired by SNCF were subsequently rebranded along with other international rail freight companies in the SNCF group in February 2010 as Captrain.

In January 2010 the total acquisition of Ermewa (a major European wagon hire business) by SNCF Geodis via the SNCF subsidiary company Transport et Logistique Partenaires SA was cleared by the European Commission.

In December 2010, SNCF Geodis completed its purchase of ITL Eisenbahngesellschaft.

Research of the social democratic party in the European Parliament, the Sheffield Hallam University and further Groups accuses Geodis in 2023 of using Uyghur forced labour camps provided by the Sunrise Manufacture Group Co. for production of clothes.

== Divisional structure ==
Geodis was one of five subdivisions of SNCF. The division was organised into four spheres - Geodis (integrated logistics), STVA (car transportation logistics), Rail transport, and Asset management (rolling stock leasing):

- Geodis S.A.
  - Geodis Wilson (formed from merger of Geodis Overseas merged with TNT Freight Management, Wilson Logistics and Rohde & Liesenfeld.) - road, air and sea freight logistics
  - Geodis Calberson (formerly Calberson) - messaging and express services - France and Europe
  - Geodis Logistics (formerly IBM logistics plus other acquisitions) - logistics management
  - Geodis BM (Formerly Bourgey-Montreuil) European road transport
- STVA (Société de Transports de Véhicules Automobiles )- transportation of vehicles (car etc.) via road, rail and sea.
- Rail transport:
  - Fret SNCF - French rail freight transport operations as public company
  - Captrain France - French rail freight transport operations as private company
  - Captrain - European railfreight transport operations outside France:
    - Captrain Benelux (formerly Fret SNCF Benelux, Veolia Cargo Belgium, Veolia Cargo Nederland and ITL Benelux)
    - Captrain Deutschland (formerly Fret SNCF Deutschland and Veolia Cargo Deutschland including the former Rail4Chem)
    - Captrain Italia (formerly Fret SNCF Italia and Veolia Cargo Italia)
    - Captrain UK (formerly Freight Europe UK)
    - Captrain Romania (formerly VFLI Romania)
- Asset management - locomotive and wagon leasing and related services:
  - Akiem (locomotives)
  - Ermewa (wagons) with
  - France Wagons (wagons), merged into Ermewa group May 2010.
  - Transengrais (rail transport of fertilizer - vehicle lease or rental)
