= Verein für Leibesübungen =

Verein für Leibesübungen (VfL, English: Association for Physical Education) is a common prefix part of the name for German sports clubs. It can refer to:

- VfL Algenrodt, sports club in Algenrodt, Idar-Oberstein, Rheinland-Pfalz
- VfL Altenbögge, association football club in Bönen, Nordrhein-Westfalen
- VfL Benrath, sports club in Düsseldorf, Nordrhein-Westfalen
- VfL Bergen 94, sports club in Bergen auf Rügen, Mecklenburg-Vorpommern
- VfL Birkenau, association football club in Birkenau, Hessen
- VfL Nord Berlin, association football club in Berlin
- VfL Eintracht Bitterfeld, sports club in Bitterfeld-Wolfen, Sachsen-Anhalt
- VfL Bochum, sports club in Bochum, Nordrhein-Westfalen
- VfL Duisburg-Süd, sports club in Duisburg, Nordrhein-Westfalen
- VfL Edewecht, sports club in Edewecht, Niedersachsen
- VfL Engelskirchen, sports club in Engelskirchen, Nordrhein-Westfalen
- VfL Fredenbeck, sports club in Fredenbeck, Niedersachsen
- VfL Frohnlach, sports club in Ebersdorf bei Coburg, Oberfranken
- VfL 1990 Gera, sports club in Gera, Thüringen
- VfL Germania 1894, association football club in Frankfurt am Main, Hessen
- VfL Gladbeck, sports club in Gladbeck, Nordrhein-Westfalen
- VfL Günzburg, sports club in Günzburg, Schwaben
- VfL Grün-Gold Güstrow, sports club in Güstrow, Mecklenburg-Vorpommern
- VfL Gummersbach, sports club in Gummersbach, Nordrhein-Westfalen, best known for its handball section
- VfL Eintracht Hagen, sports club in Hagen, Nordrhein-Westfalen
- VfL Halle 1896, sports club in Halle, Sachsen-Anhalt
- VfL 93 Hamburg, sports club in Hamburg
- VfL Hameln, sports club in Hameln, Niedersachsen
- VfL Hannover, sports club in Hannover, Niedersachsen
- VfL Herzlake, sports club in Herzlake, Niedersachsen
- VfL Kirchheim/Teck, sports club in Kirchheim unter Teck, Baden-Württemberg
- VfL Klafeld-Geisweid 08, association football club in Siegen, Nordrhein-Westfalen
- VfL Köln 1899, sports club in Köln, Nordrhein-Westfalen
- VfL Germania Leer, sports club in Leer, Niedersachsen
- VfL Leverkusen, association football club in Leverkusen, Nordrhein-Westfalen
- VfL Lintorf, sports club in Bad Essen, Niedersachsen
- VfL 1860 Marburg, sports club in Marburg, Hessen
- VfL Meiningen 04, association football club in Meiningen, Thüringen
- Borussia VfL 1900 Mönchengladbach, sports club in Mönchengladbach, Nordrhein-Westfalen
- VfL Nauen, sports club in Nauen, Brandenburg
- VfL Bad Nauheim, sports club in Bad Nauheim, Hessen
- VfL Neckarau, sports club in Mannheim, Baden-Württemberg
- VfL Neckargartach, sports club in Heilbronn, Baden-Württemberg
- VfL Neustadt/Coburg, association football club in Neustadt bei Coburg, Oberfranken
- VfL Neustadt/Weinstraße, association football club in Neustadt an der Weinstraße, Rheinland-Pfalz
- VfL Neuwied, sports club in Neuwied, Rheinland-Pfalz
- VfL Oldenburg, sports club in Oldenburg, Niedersachsen
- VfL Oldesloe, sports club in Bad Oldesloe, Schleswig-Holstein
- VfL Osnabrück, sports club in Osnabrück, Niedersachsen
- VfL Osterspai, sports club in Osterspai, Rheinland-Pfalz
- VfL Oythe, sports club in Vechta, Niedersachsen
- VfL Pfullingen, sports club in Pfullingen, Baden-Württemberg
- VfL Pinneberg, sports club in Pinneberg, Schleswig-Holstein
- VfL Pirna-Copitz, sports club in Pirna, Sachsen
- 1. VfL Potsdam, handball club in Potsdam, Brandenburg
- VfL Reken, association football club in Reken, Nordrhein-Westfalen
- VfL Rhede, sports club in Rhede, Nordrhein-Westfalen
- VfL 06 Saalfeld, association football club in Saalfeld/Saale, Thüringen
- VfL Sankt Augustin, sports club in Sankt Augustin-Mülldorf, Nordrhein-Westfalen
- VfL Bad Schwartau, sports club in Bad Schwartau, Schleswig-Holstein
- VfL Schwerin, former association football club in Schwerin, Mecklenburg
- VfL Sindelfingen, sports club in Sindelfingen, Baden-Württemberg
- VfL Stade, sports club in Stade, Niedersachsen
- VfL Stettin, former association football club in Stettin, Pommern
- VfL Trier, sports club in Trier, Rheinland-Pfalz
- VfL Ulm/Neu-Ulm, sports club in Ulm, Baden-Württemberg
- VfL Waiblingen, sports club in Waiblingen, Baden-Württemberg
- VfL Wildenfels, sports club in Wildenfels, Sachsen
- VfL Wittekind Wildeshausen, sports club in Wildeshausen, Niedersachsen
- VfL Wolfsburg, sports club in Wolfsburg, Niedersachsen
