= Mohammad Reza Adelkhani =

Iranian footballer (born 1947)

Reza Adelkhani
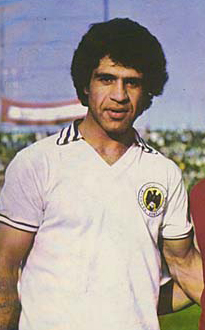
- Adelkhani before Shahbaz's match against Persepolis at Aryamehr Stadium in April 1978

Personal information
- Full name: Mohammad Reza Adelkhani
- Date of birth: February 13, 1947 (age 79)
- Place of birth: Tehran, Iran
- Height: 1.72 m (5 ft 8 in)
- Position: Forward

Youth career
- 1960–1962: Taj
- 1962–1964: Bayern Munich

Senior career*
Years	Team	Apps	(Gls)
1964–1966	Bayern Munich		
1966–1968	Rot-Weiß Oberhausen		
1968–1969	Wuppertaler SV	41	(6)
1969–1970	Bonner SC		
1970–1971	SG Wattenscheid 09		
1971–1972	VfL Klafeld-Geisweid		
1972–1976	Taj		
1976–1977	Shahbaz		
1977–1979	Taj		

International career
1973–1978	Iran	17	(2)
Medal record
Representing Iran
Asian Games
Gold medal – first place	1974 Tehran	Team competition
- * Club domestic league appearances and goals

Mohammad Reza Adelkhani (Persian: محمدرضا عادلخانی, born February 13, 1947, in Tehran, Iran) is a retired Iranian footballer and former Iran national football team player.

Adelkhani achieved the UEFA Pro Licence, the first Iranian to do so.

== Early life ==
He was born on 13 February 1947 in Tehran, Iran. He began playing in football in 1960 playing at Shahin.

== Club career ==
Adelkhani played for SG Wattenscheid 09, Wuppertaler SV, Rot-Weiß Oberhausen, Bayern Munich and VfL Klafeld-Geisweid before moving back to Iran. He was the first Iranian player to move to Europe to play football. When he was in Turkey with Taj SC for a friendly match, German talent scouts saw his performance and signed him for Bayern Munchen.

Adelkhani's first senior club in Iran was Taj SC with whom he reached champion title in the Iranian league in Takht Jamshid Cup. He then joined Shahbaz F.C., where he reached third place in the Iranian league in 1976/77.

== International career ==
Between 1973 and 1978, he played 17 times for the national team and scored 2 goals.

Iranian football fans will never forget the Asian football Olympic final 1974 in Aryamehr Stadium between Iran and Israel, in which Adelkhani forced Shum's own goal, which led Iran to win this tournament.

He was part of the Iran squad that qualified for the 1978 FIFA World Cup. However, an injury he sustained while saving his young daughter from falling down the stairs kept him out of the competition.

He was a left-footed player.
