= Hans Grieger =

German footballer

Personal information
- Full name: Hans Grieger
- Date of birth: 17 September 1941
- Place of birth: Bogendorf, Silesia, Germany
- Date of death: 1998
- Position: Midfielder

Youth career
- SV Netphen

Senior career*
Years	Team	Apps	(Gls)
–1965	SV Netphen		
1965–1971	VfL Bochum		
1971–?	VfL Klafeld-Geisweid 08		

International career
1965	West Germany Olympic	1	(?)
- * Club domestic league appearances and goals

Hans Grieger (17 September 1941 – 1998) is a retired German football midfielder.
