= COMSA =

Spanish construction and infrastructure development company

COMSA Corporación
- Industry: Construction, infrastructure
- Founded: 1891
- Founder: José Miarnau Navás
- Headquarters: Barcelona, Spain
- Area served: Worldwide
- Products: Construction and rail infrastructure
- Net income: € 778 million (2020)
- Number of employees: 5,300 (2020)

COMSA Corporación is a Spanish global group focused on infrastructure development, industrial engineering and services, whose main business historically has been railway infrastructure. The corporation is headquartered in Barcelona, Catalonia.

== History ==
=== Comsa ===
The groups beginnings can be traced back to 1891 when railway employee José Miarnau Navás set up company to carry out railway infrastructure work in Reus (Tarragona) called Construcciones Miarnau SA. By 1930, the company became a public company and moved its headquarters from Reus to Barcelona. After the founder died in 1934, the company changed its name to Hijos de José Miarnau Navás. By the 1940s, the company had expanded into the general civil engineering field – building bridges, buildings and roads. By the 1980s, the company had expanded from its base in Catalonia having projects in Asturias, Andalusia, Galicia and Castile and León, and had also entered the real estate and aggregates businesses. The 1990s, brought further diversification as well as the beginnings of an international presence with a subsidiary Fergrupo in Portugal.

After its merger with Estudios, Montajes y Tendidos Eléctricos (EMTE) in 2009, it was renamed COMSA EMTE, but in 2015 it became part of the COMSA corporation, which was organized into three business areas: Infrastructure and Engineering, Services and Technology, Concessions and Renewable Energies. By 2010s, the international business had grown, exceeding twenty countries and reaching half of the company's turnover. In the 2020s, the company had presence in ten countries and it diversified its activity towards sectors such as the environment, rail transport, renewable energies and concessions.

== Company structure and activities ==
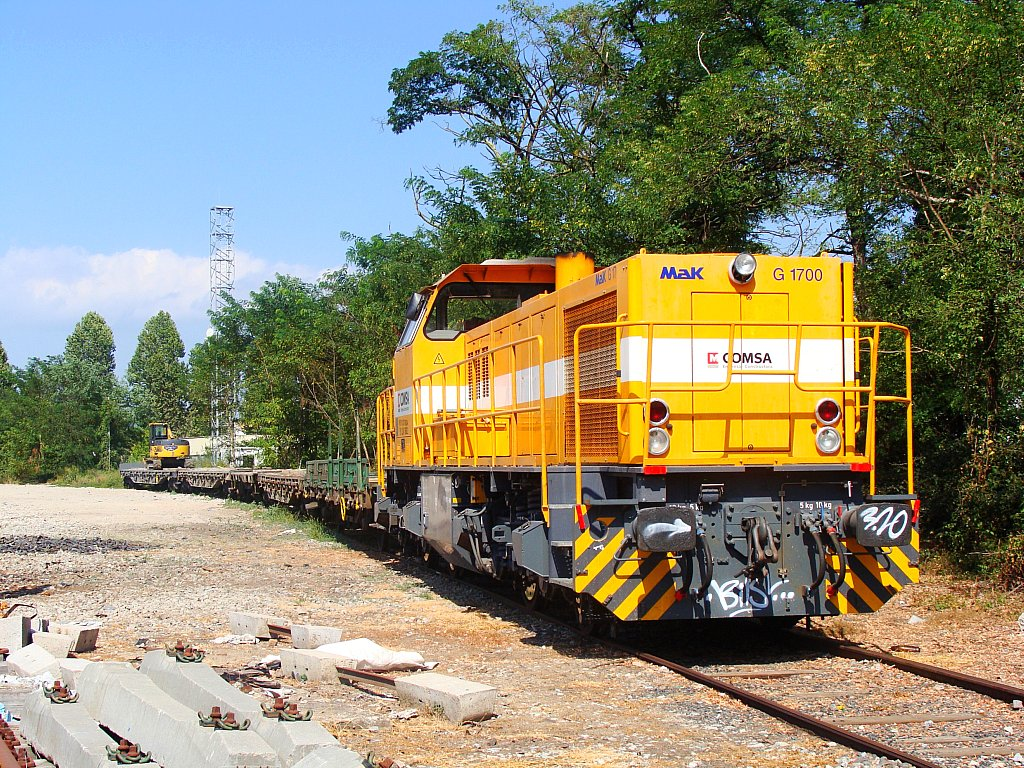
COMSA class 317 locomotive in Caldes de Malavella train station (2010)

The main railway and infrastructure businesses within Spain were organised within the company COMSA.

In Spain COMSA carried out all aspects of railway building from the planning stage to construction and maintenance; high profile projects included work on the infrastructure of the high speed Asturias link and Vitoria-Bilbao line. Other work included the construction of sidings for manufacturing companies including BASF, Ford Espania, Repsol Butano and Volkswagen, rolling stock shed and workshop construction, and electrification projects.

In the general construction field the group carried out road, bridge, industrial, public and office building projects, as well as water infrastructure, harbour and airport construction.

=== Logistics ===
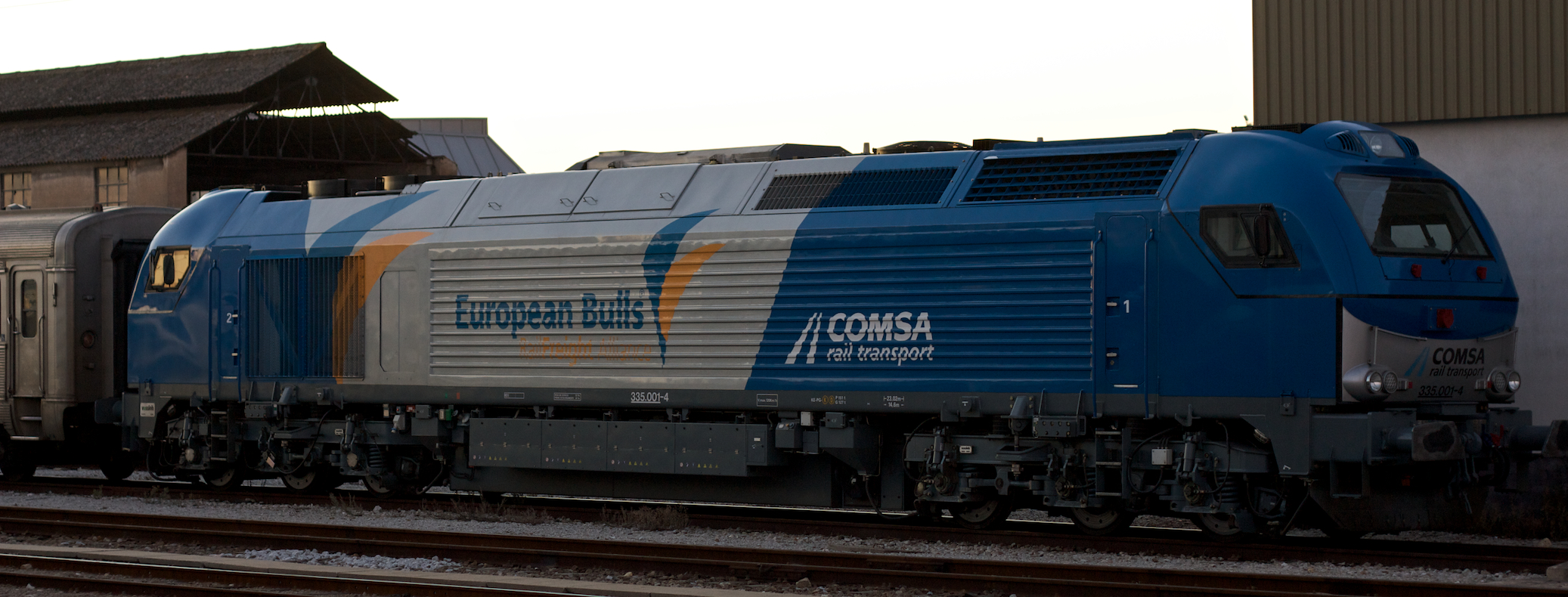
A Comsa Vossloh Euro locomotive stopped at Entroncamento train station in Portugal

COMSA Rail Transport was set up in 2002, and was the first private company in Spain to acquire a license for the de-monopolized rail system. A subsidiary operated in Poland as 'Fer Polska'.

The firm GMF (Gestíon de Maquinaria Ferroviaria) managed the groups rolling stock including the track infrastructure equipment (track tampers etc.).

=== Other business activities ===
- The 'CUMESA' and 'Ubladesa' companies were involved in quarrying/mining of aggregates
- 'TRAVIPOS' – a joint venture with Rail.One GmbH produced precast concrete sleepers and other structures for the rail industry.

== International operations ==
COMSA Corporación operates in 20 countries. The group has presence in Europe (Andorra, Croatia, Denmark, Spain, France, Latvia, Lithuania, Poland, Portugal, Sweden, Switzerland), Latin America (Brazil, Chile, Colombia, Mexico, Paraguay, Peru, Uruguay) and North Africa (Algeria, Morocco).

Some of the subsidiaries of the group were operated in Poland, Portugal, Argentina, Australia and Chile:

=== Argentina ===
The rail infrastructure subsidiary COMSA de Argentina was created in 1994.

=== Australia ===
COMSA had a 40% shareholding in MVM Rail, with Macmahon Holdings purchasing the other 60% in January 2006. It undertakes most aspects of railway infrastructure work including signalling and overhead cable installation. Outside Australia MVM has worked on rail projects in Southeast Asian countries. The company was founded in 1992 by COMSA and Valditerra of Italy.

=== Chile ===
The rail infrastructure subsidiary COMSA de Chile was created in 1995.

=== Poland ===
COMSA owned a majority share in the three subsidiaries that make up the company Trakcja Polska:

- PKRE – involved out the design and implementation of railway electrical power systems.
- PKRiI (Przedsiębiorstwo Robót Kolejowych i Inżynieryjnych SA) The companies' main line of business was the groundwork for and installation of railway track and associated infrastructure.
- PRK7 (Przedsiębiorstwo Robót Komunikacyjnych 7 S.A) became part of Trakcja Polska in 2007; the company specialises in public building construction and in rail and tramway creation and repair.

=== Portugal ===
Fergrupo (FERGRUPO, Construções e Técnicas Ferroviárias, S.A.) was founded in 1989 as a venture between stockholders COMSA, the Italian company Valditerra Spa and the Portuguese company R. Delerue. The company carries out all aspects of railway infrastructure building and maintenance projects.
