= Voies Ferrées des Landes =

Voies Ferrées des Landes (VFL)
- Industry: Railways
- Predecessor: Chemins de fer d'intérêt local des Landes (CFILL); Chemins de fer du Born et du Marensin (BM); Chemin der fer d'intérêt local de Soustons à Léon (SL)
- Founded: 1916
- Successor: VFLI

The Voies Ferrées des Landes (French pronunciation: [vwa fɛʁe de lɑ̃d], VFL) was founded in 1916 from the merger of three short line railway companies in the Landes forest region of Gascony, France.

The railway lines were created primarily to transport timber from the forested area. By the beginning of the 21st century only 17 km of the peak of 361 km peak length of the railway remained in commercial use.

A section of the line between Labouheyre and Sabres was taken over by the Association française des amis des chemins de fer (AFAC) and now serves an agricultural museum in Marquèze.

== History ==
In 1854 the Chemin de Fer du Midi (CF du Midi) had constructed a line between Bordeaux and Dax, the Landes Forest, created in the 18th century was by then producing mature trees. In 1875, the company began to support though subsidiary companies the creation of secondary lines serving agricultural roads built in the area in the 1850s.

The Chemins de fer d'intérêt local des Landes (CFILL) opened several lines in 1890, between 1905 and 1911 the Chemins de fer du Born et du Marensin (BM) opened more lines, some extending the CFILL lines further from their terminuses, others were new lines branching from the Bordeaux - Bayonne mainline. Additionally the company Chemin der fer d'intérêt local de Soustons à Léon (SL) had opened a 22 km line extending a branch extending the CFILL in 1904.

By 1910 the combined railway lines were over 350 km long. The three railway companies served the same region, and in part were interdependent. To simplify the administration the 'CF du Midi' asked that the firms be consolidated under the name Voies Ferrées des Landes; in 1916 the three merged in 1916 to form the Société anonymes des Voies Ferrées des Landes (VFL).

The lines temporarily closed to passengers in 1939 due to a fuel shortage in the buildup to the Battle of France. After re-opening passenger services continued until 1949 after which the services ended on all but two branches. Freight services ended on many lines in 1969, and in 1979, with almost all activity ended by the end of the 1980s.

In 1947 the VFL lines became the responsibility of the département des Landes, and is now the responsibility of the Landes transport authority (fr:Régie des Transports Landais French). Freight on the lines did not end entirely, when the company Voies Ferrées Locales et Industrielles (VFLI) was created in 1998 it took over responsibility for operations on the lines: Trains on the Laluque/Tartas, and a short section within the industrial area of Ychoux on the Ychoux to Moustey and less than 1 km in Dax (traffic ended 2005) were still in use in the early 2000s.

== Tourism ==
A section on the line between Labouheyre and Sabres was taken over by the non-profit organisation the Association française des amis des chemins de fer (AFAC) (Association française des amis des chemins de fer French) and now serves a site of the Écomusée de la Grande Lande (Écomusée de la Grande Lande French) located in Marquèze.

== See also ==
- Forest railway
- VFLI
