= Ozburn-Hessey Logistics =

OHL
- Company type: Private company
- Industry: Logistics
- Founded: 1951; 75 years ago in the United States
- Defunct: 2016
- Fate: Acquired by Geodis S.A.
- Successor: Geodis USA, Inc.
- Headquarters: Brentwood, Tennessee, United States
- Key people: Randy Curran, CEO
- Number of employees: > 6,000 (2008)
- Parent: Geodis
- Divisions: Transportation, Warehousing and Distribution, International Logistics Services
- Website: www.ohl.com

Ozburn-Hessey Logistics, or OHL, is a former American logistics company, acquired by Geodis. It began business in 1951 in Nashville, Tennessee, at one point one of the largest third-party logistics companies in the USA.

== Acquisition ==
In 2015, Geodis, a French logistics company and division of SNCF, acquired OHL and dissolved it (it did not remain a subsidiary company). Taking over OHL's 120 distribution centers and all of its US operations, Geodis gained a very strategic market share in the American logistics industry.
