= Marie-Christine Lombard =

French business executive (born 1958)

Marie-Christine Lombard (born 1958) is a French business executive. She was appointed CEO of Geodis in October 2012. She is also a member of the Supervisory Board of Keolis. Since 2008, she also has been chairing the Coordinating Committee of Lyon Ville Entrepreneuriat, a network supporting business, start-ups, development and transfers for the Greater Lyon region.

== Early life and education ==
After obtaining a bachelor's degree in science, Lombard entered the French business school ESSEC and graduated in 1981.

== Career ==
Lombard began her career in the United States as head of merchandising at the department stores chain Lord & Taylor.

Between 1983 and 1986, Lombard was in charge of the department of multinationals at Chemical Bank in New York.

Lombard then joined Paribas: first in Corporate Finance, from 1986 to 1988, and later in the M&A department (1988-1991). In 1991, Paribas appointed her Regional Delegate for international mergers and acquisitions, a position she held until 1992, and branch Deputy Director in Lyon (1991-1993).

Lombard left Paribas and the banking sector to join TPG Group, the leading express mail, parcel and documents delivery, renamed TNT in 2005. Subsequently, she became CEO (1999-2003) then Chairwoman and CEO of the subsidiary Jet Services, which became TNT Express France in 2002. In 2004, she was appointed CEO of the Express group division and member of TNT Executive board. In May 2011, she took up a new position as Chairwoman and CEO of TNT Express NV, a position from which she resigned in September 2012.

In October 2012, Lombard was appointed CEO of Geodis, following a proposal by Pierre Blayau, Chairman of the group. In December 2013, she was appointed Chairman of the Executive Board of Geodis.

== Other positions ==
- BNP Paribas, Member of the Board of Directors (since 2024)
- Vinci, Independent Member of the Board of Directors (since 2014)
- Groupe BPCE, Member of the Supervisory Board (2010–2018)

== Honors ==
- Knight of the French order Légion d’honneur since 2005
