= VfL Klafeld-Geisweid 08 =

German football club

VfL Klafeld-Geisweid
- Full name: VfL 08 e. V. Klafeld-Geisweid
- Nickname: Sovereigns
- Founded: 1908
- Ground: Hofbachstadion
- Capacity: 10,000
- Chairman: Gerald Kühn
- Manager: Klaus Schmidt
- League: Kreisliga A Westfalen (IX)
- 2015–16: 11th
Home colours	Away colours

VfL Klafeld-Geisweid 08 is a German football club playing in the Klafeld-Geiswald district of Siegen, North Rhine-Westphalia.

== History ==
The club has its roots in the village teams of SG Sigambria Geisweid, founded in 1908, and SpVgg Klafeld. In 1927 these two sides merged to form SpVgg Klafeld-Geisweid. This club was joined by Turngemeinde Friesen in 1946 to form "VfL Klafeld-Geisweid 08". The gymnastics department would separate the following year to become Turngemeinde Friesen Klafeld-Geisweid 1889.

After World War II in 1946 the footballers began play in the Bezirksliga Siegerland (V) and won promotion to the Landesliga Westfalen (IV) in 1952 led by head coach (manager) Kurt Brosi (1949–56) who left the football club in 1956. They played at that level until 1957 when they were relegated to the Bezirksliga where the VfL footballers remained until 1963 when the club was promoted back to the Landesliga and thereafter advanced to the Verbandsliga Westfalen-2 (III) for the first time in 1964. A sixteenth-place finish saw the club quickly relegated to the Landesliga but they returned to third-tier football in 1967. Just four years later, despite losing the overall division championship 0:1 to Arminia Gütersloh, the team earned promotion to the second division Regionalliga West for the 1971–72 season, which was the high point of the club's history. The team was well-supported in spite of its poor performance in the Regionalliga, drawing nearly 4,000 spectators a game. Part of the club's success through these years was based on the support of Hans Elbracht, head of the Edelstahlwerke Südwestfalen GmbH steelworks in Geisweid, who made jobs available for the players, a critical contribution in an era of still largely amateur football in Germany.

The side fell quickly after their single season turn in the Regionalliga, through Verbandsliga to the fourth division Landesliga within two years. On 13 October 1974 VfL lost a friendly to Bundesliga side Eintracht Frankfurt by a score of 0:9.

The club recovered and returned to third division play (Verbandsliga Westfalen-2 (III)) on the strength of a Landesliga title in 1978. VfL acquitted itself well finishing in the upper half of the table in five of the next seven seasons before being sent down again to the Landesliga in 1985. During this stretch the club made its first German Cup appearances in 1981 and 1982 losing 1:2 to Rot-Weiß Frankfurt and 0:4 to VfB Stuttgart II.

The club currently plays in the tier eight Bezirksliga Westfalen where it has been achieving mostly mid-table finishes. The 2014–15 season has witnessed VfL Klafeld-Geisweid 08 being demoted to the Kreisliga A for the 2015–16 playing season after finishing in 15th place (second to last).

== Stadium ==
The club plays is home matches in the Hofbachstadion which has a capacity of 10,000 spectators making it the second largest stadium facility in Siegen. It is also one of only two natural grass football pitches in the city.

During their Regionalliga season in 1971–72 the team played in the Leimbachstadion which was at the time the home stadium of their largest rival Sportfreunde Siegen.

== Regionalliga team 1971–72 ==
- Mohammad Reza Adelkhani
- Bernd Brodbek
- Gerd vom Bruch
- Norbert Dörr
- Otto Gräbener
- Hans Grieger
- Dieter Henrichs
- Wolfgang Janke
- Fritz Knebel
- Gunter Ostehr
- Uwe Ostehr
- Willy Reese
- Wolfgang Schröder
- Joachim Schwarz
- Peter Sichmann
- Horst Stockhausen
- Günter Thielmann
- Wolfgang Vetter
- Erich Weaver
- Martin Weber
- Helmfried Wien
- Wolfgang Wittemund
