= Captrain France =

French freight rail company

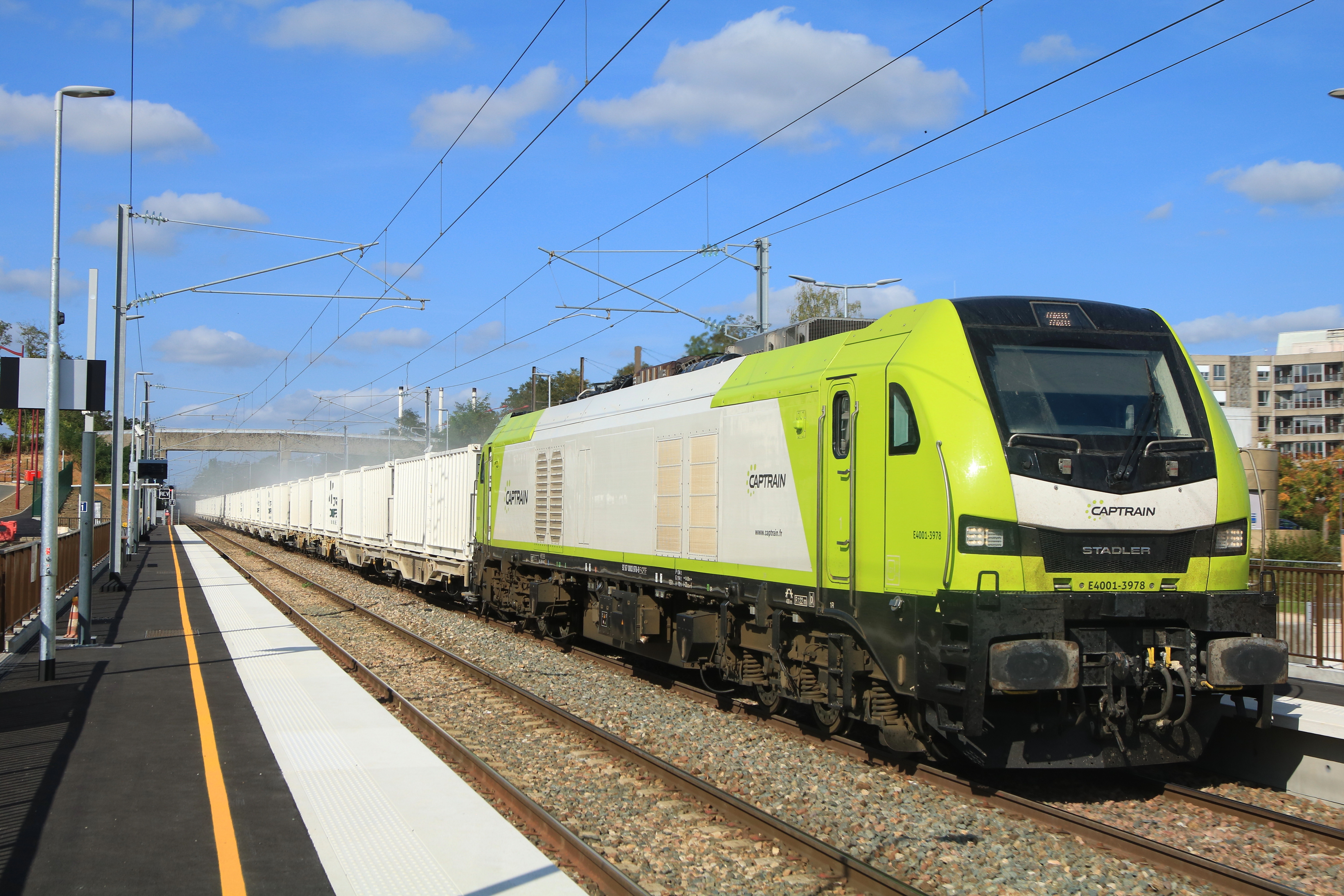
- Captrain Euro 4001 passes through Le Mans Hôpital-Université station
- Formerly: VFLI
- Industry: freight rail transport
- Founded: 1998
- Headquarters: Paris, France
- Parent: Rail Logistics Europe
- Website: www.vfli.fr www.groupe-vfli.com

Captrain France (French pronunciation: [kaptʁɛ̃ fʁɑ̃s]), formerly VFLI, is a French freight rail company. It is a subsidiary of SNCF's Rail Logistics Europe. The company was formed in 1998 as a low-cost short line and industrial railway operator.

== History ==
VFLI was established in 1998 by SNCF to operate as a low-cost operation. Initially, the company took over the operations of two industrial railway systems: Voies Ferrées des Landes (VFL) and Mines Dominiales de Potasse d'Alsace.

In 2000, the company began a joint venture with Compagnie des chemins de fer départementaux (CFD) named Voies Ferrées du Morvan to operate the 87 km Avallon-Autun railway line, and in 2001 took over operations on the Houllières du Bassin de Lorraine (HBL) via a subsidiary VFLI Cargo.

Up to 2007, the company was involved in the construction of LGV Est through the subsidiary Fertis. (Note: Fertis hired Class 56 and Class 58 locomotives from EWS, England to work the construction trains.)

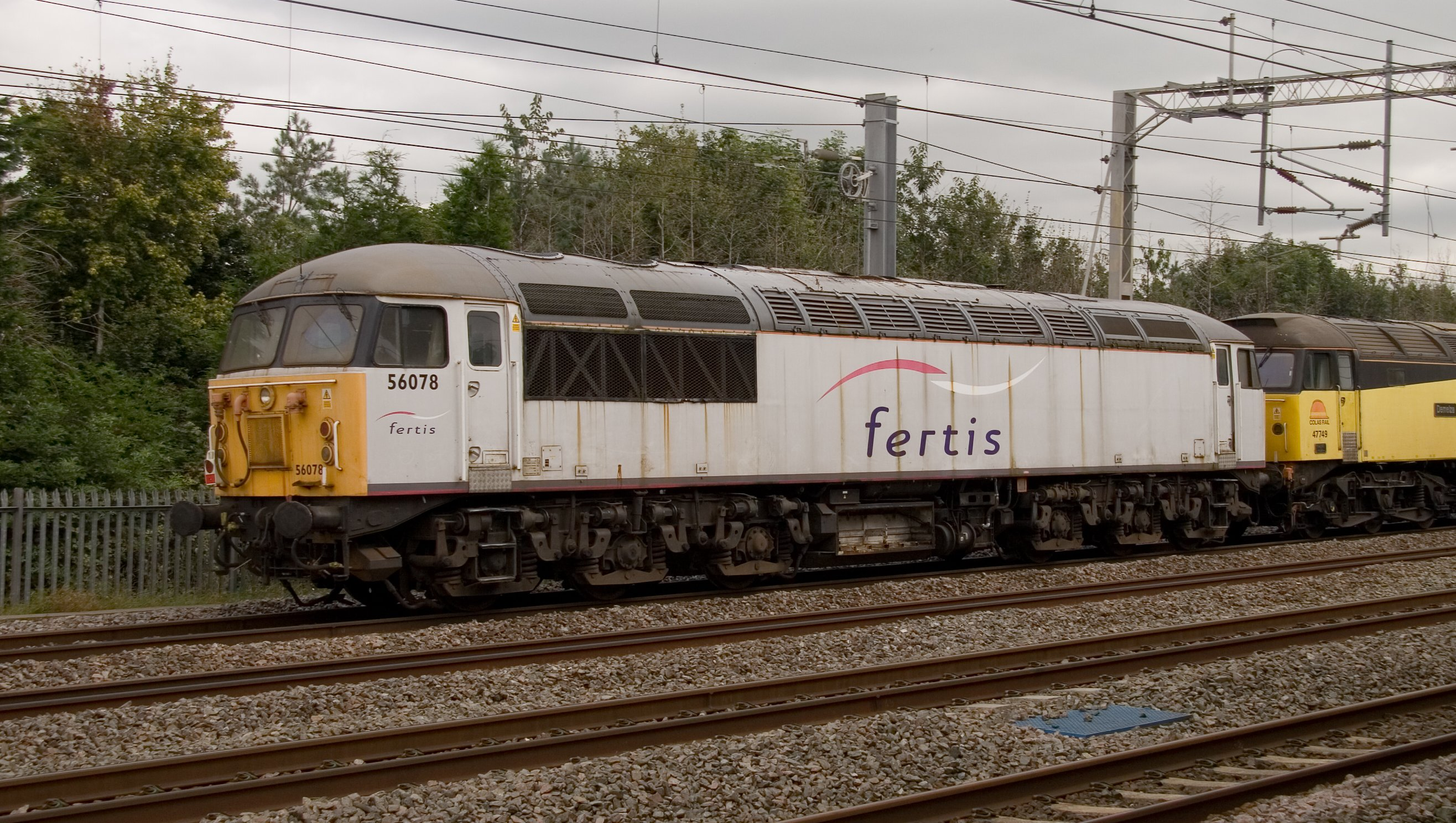
Fertis class 56

In 2007, VFLI was certified to run trains on the full extent of the French national railway network owned by Réseau Ferré de France. By 2008, the company was providing services for around forty industrial sites, with clients having included Rhodia, Arkema, Arcelor, (Note: Contract ended late 2007.) Renault and Coke de Carling, Ciments français, Lafarge, Elf, Port Edouard Herriot (Lyon), ALZ, Smurfit SCF in Facture and PSA (in Trnava, Slovakia). Other contracts included transport of combustion waste from Protires waste processing plant in Strasbourg, work sub-contracted from SNCF, and transportation from ports.

In January 2021, VFLI was rebranded Captrain France.

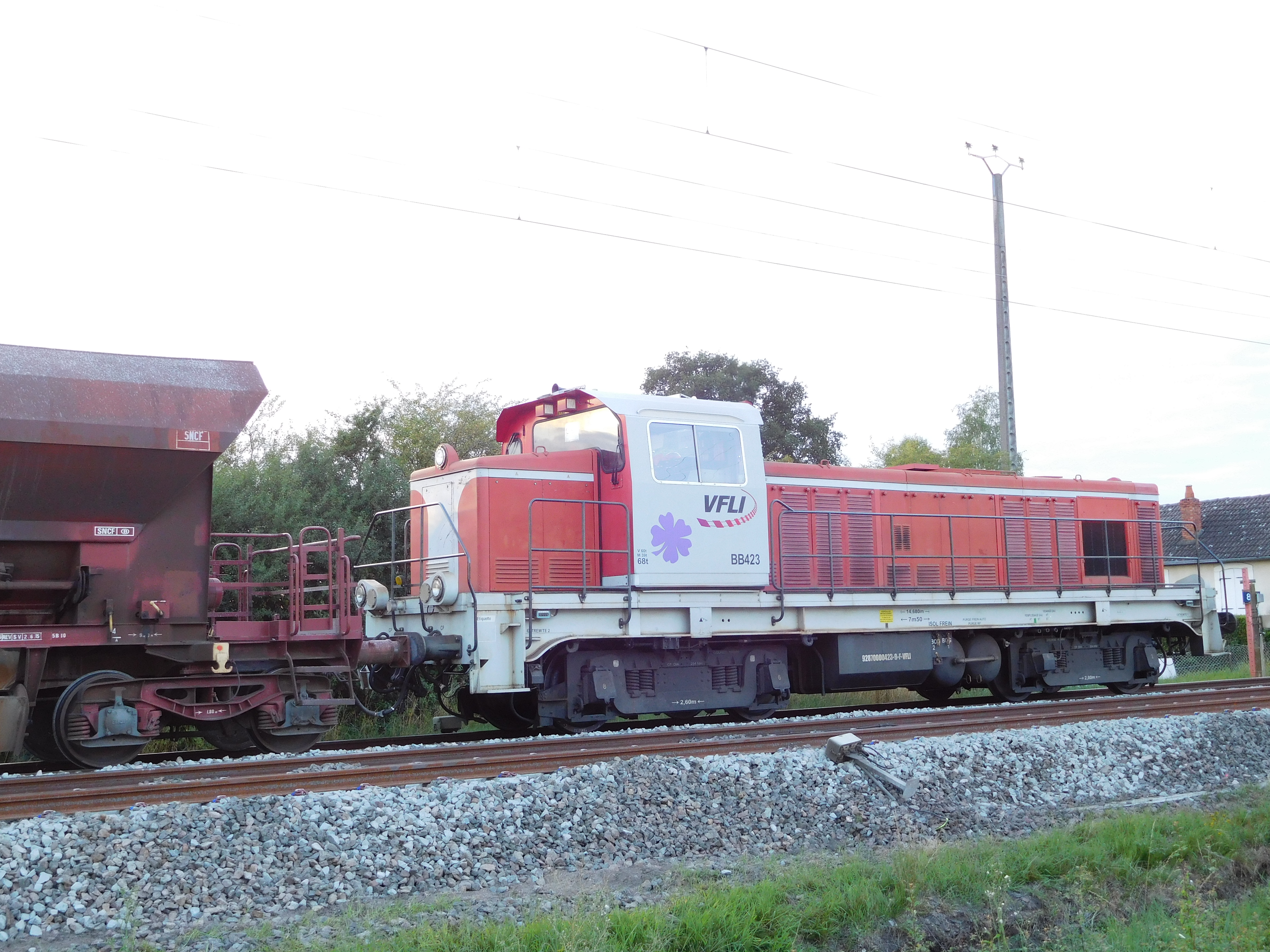

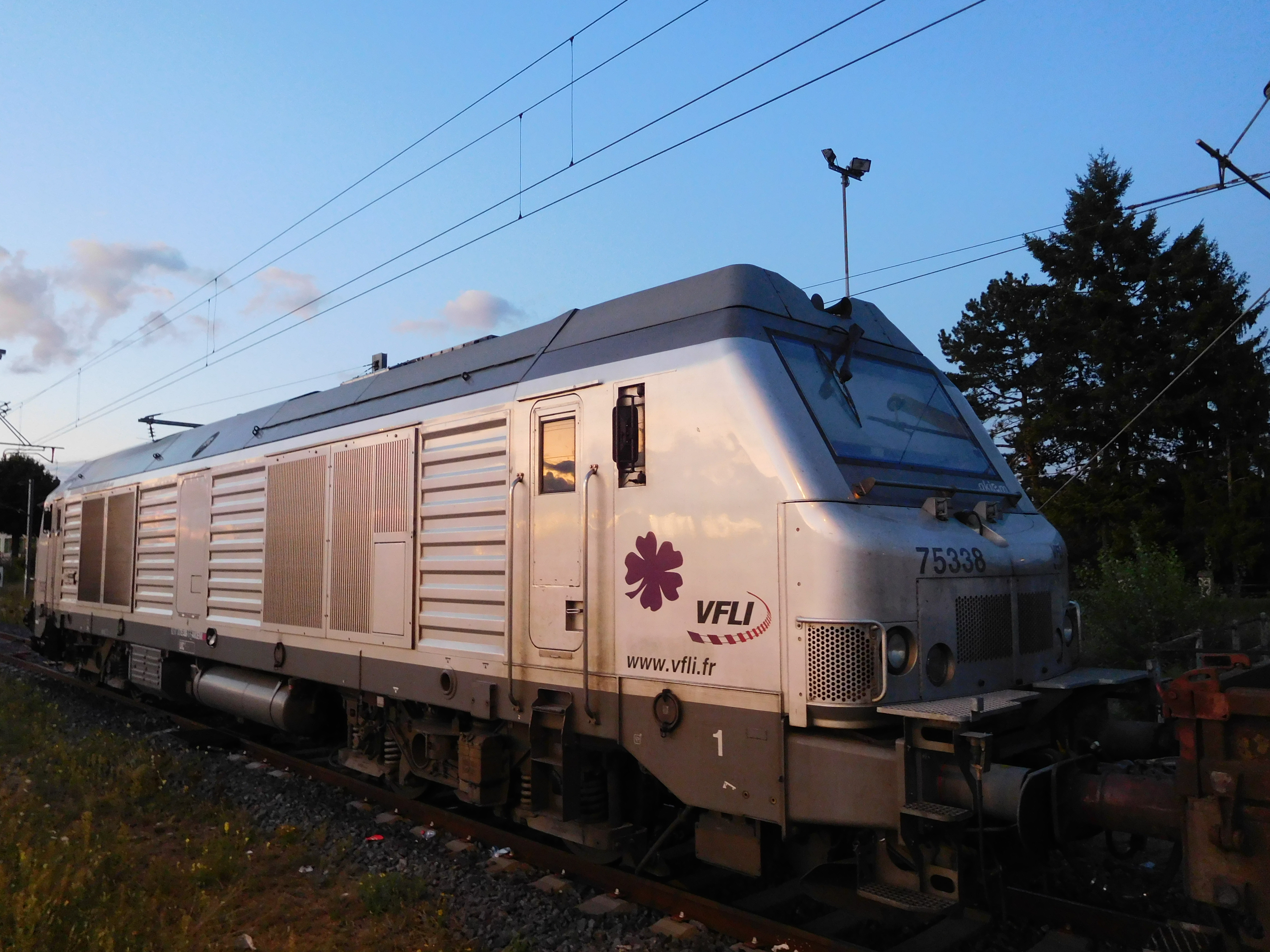
VFLI Alstom Prima

== Current operations ==
As of 2012, VFLI's operations are in four main areas: main rail freight in France; rail freight operations at industrial sites; rail infrastructure train haulage; and short haul operations including port railways.

Main line freight rail accounted in 2011 for nearly two-thirds of VFLI's turnover, representing a turnover of 67.7 million Euros, compared to 5.4 million Euros in 2007.

== Rolling stock and facilities ==
In 2010, VFLI owned approximately 100 diesel locomotives, mostly shunting and short trip locomotives, as well as about 800 wagons.

The company also operates rolling stock workshops, carrying out maintenance and refurbishment.
