= Rail Logistics Europe =

- Formerly: SNCF Logistics
- Industry: business and other management consulting
- Founded: January 1, 2021; 5 years ago in Paris, France
- Headquarters: Paris, France
- Owner: SNCF (100 %)
- Parent: SNCF Group
- Subsidiaries: Hexafret, Captrain France, Captrain España
- Website: www.rle-group.com

Rail Logistics Europe, or RLE, formerly SNCF Logistics, is a French freight rail multinational. It is a subsidiary of SNCF.

RLE claims to be the No. 1 rail logistics hub in France and No. 2 in Europe, with 9,535 employees in 10 countries.

== History ==
The Freight branch of the SNCF Group became SNCF Geodis in 2008 when Geodis was integrated. Within SNCF Geodis, rail transport and logistics activities are grouped under Transport Ferroviaire et Multimodal de Marchandises (TFMM). In 2015, the SNCF Geodis branch was renamed SNCF Logistics. Following the transformation of SNCF and its subsidiaries into public limited companies, a new Group organization is put in place.

Rail Logistics Europe is created on January 1, 2021, to bring together all the Group's rail freight and logistics activities.

By 2021, 68% of freight traffic in France will be handled by RLE companies.

On January 1, 2025, in line with the discontinuation plan imposed by the European Commission, Fret SNCF will be transformed into two new companies: Hexafret for rail freight in France, and Technis for the maintenance of prime movers.

== See also ==
- Geodis
