= Titan Airways =

British charter airline

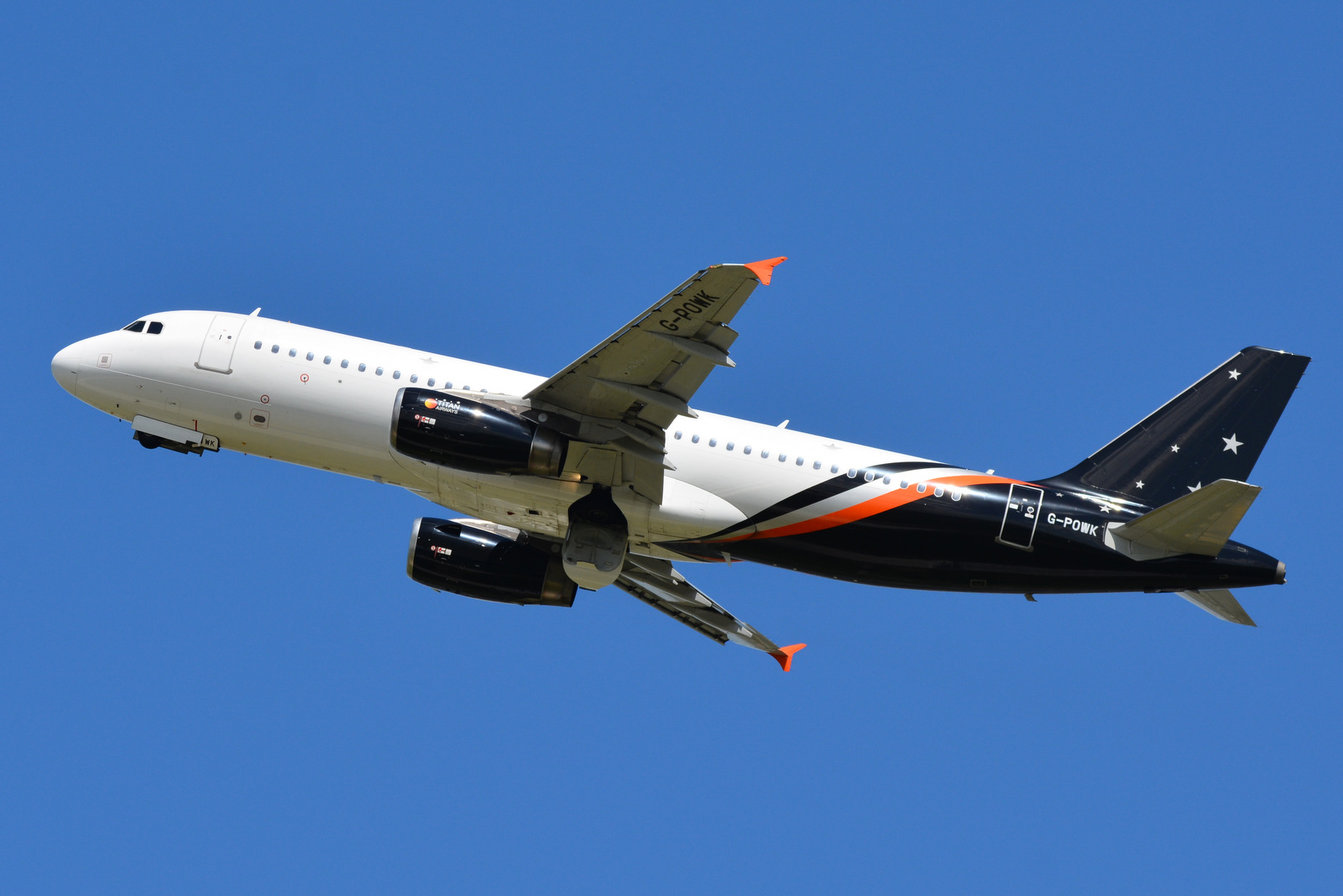
- Titan Airways Airbus A320
IATA	ICAO	Call sign
ZT	AWC	ZAP
- Founded: 20 January 1988; 38 years ago
- AOC #: 1212
- Operating bases: London Stansted Airport
- Fleet size: 10
- Headquarters: London Stansted Airport, England, UK
- Key people: Gene Willson
- Employees: 350
- Website: www.titan-airways.com

Titan Airways Limited is a British charter airline based at London Stansted Airport. The carrier specialises in short-notice ACMI (aircraft, crew, maintenance, and insurance) and wet lease operations, as well as ad-hoc passenger and cargo charter services to tour operators, corporations, governments, and the sports and entertainment sectors. The company holds a United Kingdom Civil Aviation Authority (UK CAA) Type A Operating Licence, permitting it to carry passengers, cargo and mail, on aircraft with 20 or more seats.

== History ==
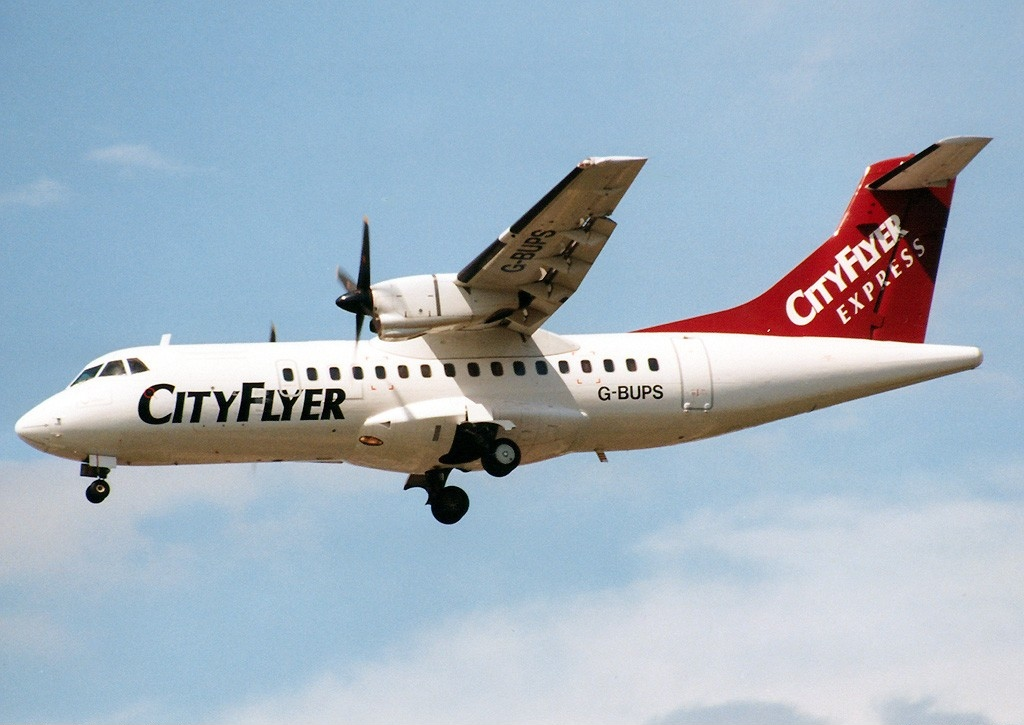
A former Titan Airways ATR42-300 operated for now defunct CityFlyer Express in 1993

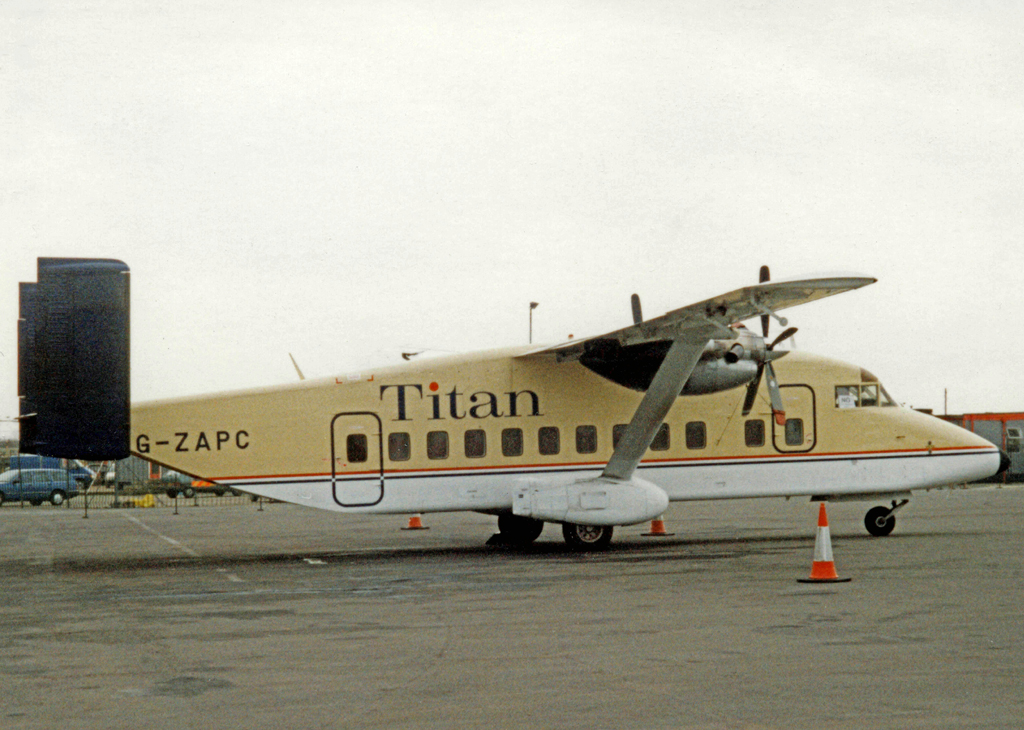
Titan Airways Short 330 in 1994

Founded on 20 January 1988, as a subsidiary of the Artac Freight and Shipping Group, Titan Airways was named after its first aircraft type, a Cessna 404 Titan, however, the airline's logo draws reference to Titan, a moon of Saturn. Their Cessna 404 aircraft were mainly used to carry car parts between various Ford and General Motors facilities in the UK and Europe, but it was also available for ad hoc freight charters and ultimately passenger charters. By 1993, the fleet had grown to include an Embraer Emb 110 Bandeirante, two Short SD 330s, and three SD 360s.

The airline's success attracted investment group 3i which took a stake in the company in 1995. Two ATR 42s were also added, before the first jet aircraft; a BAe 146-200QC was acquired in 1996. This was the first containerised jet aircraft used by the Royal Mail, but it also operated many passenger charter flights and airline sub-services. As the mail contract grew in size, the first of five Boeing 737-300s was introduced in 1999.

The airline has been consistently profitable, turning a profit in 32 of its 35-year history, and has ranked in the Sunday Times Profit Track 100 league table on six occasions since the year 2000. In the early 2000s, Titan Airways found an additional niche in the market, pioneering a rapid response Go Now sub-charter service for airlines experiencing operational problems. The innovative concept earned the company Queen's Award for Enterprise in 2001.

Demand by customer airlines for more seats and greater range led to the acquisition of two 757-200s in 2003 and 2005, with one aircraft having a VIP interior for corporate use. In 2006, Titan achieved ETOPS rating for the aircraft, enabling long haul charters to the US and Middle East. The largest aircraft in the Titan family, a 265-seat Boeing 767-300, joined the fleet in 2009, and the smallest, a new Cessna Citation CJ2+ arrived in December 2011.

In 2012, Titan Airways became an independent company, following a management buyout that left Gene Willson, managing director and one of the original founders, as the sole share holder.

Titan added its first Airbus aircraft, an Airbus A320, to its fleet in early spring 2013. This addition was the first step in its long-term fleet strategy which will see Titan's current fleet of Boeing aircraft gradually being replaced by Airbus aircraft over the next five to six years. Two additional A320s joined the fleet in early 2015.

September 2015 saw Titan announce plans to add an Airbus A319 and Airbus A321 to the fleet before the start of summer 2016, and that they were considering adding the smallest member of the Airbus A320 family, an Airbus A318, to their fleet.

In early 2023, Titan Airways retired both their last Boeing 737 and 757 aircraft.

== Operations ==
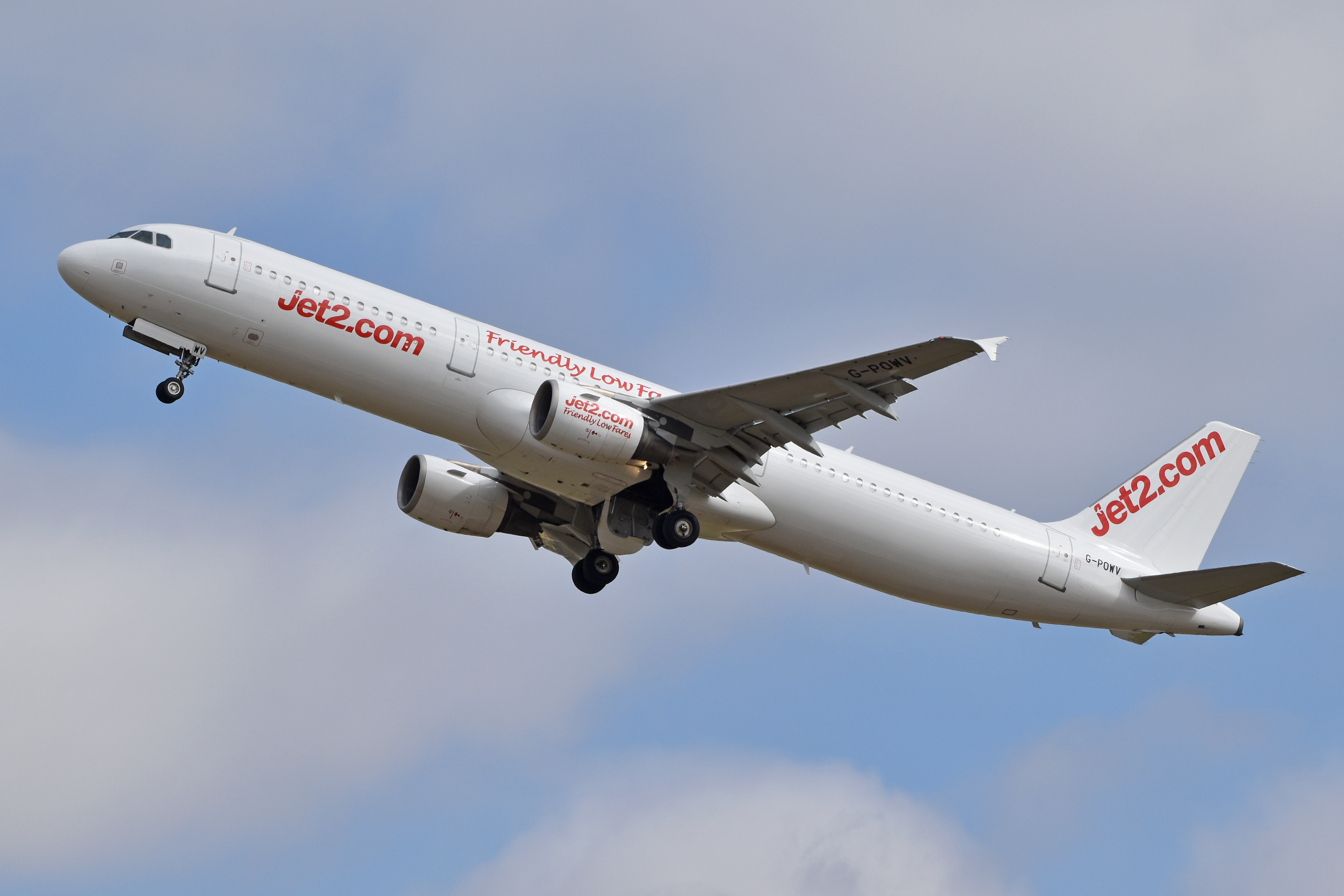
Titan Airways Airbus A321-200 operating on lease to Jet2.com

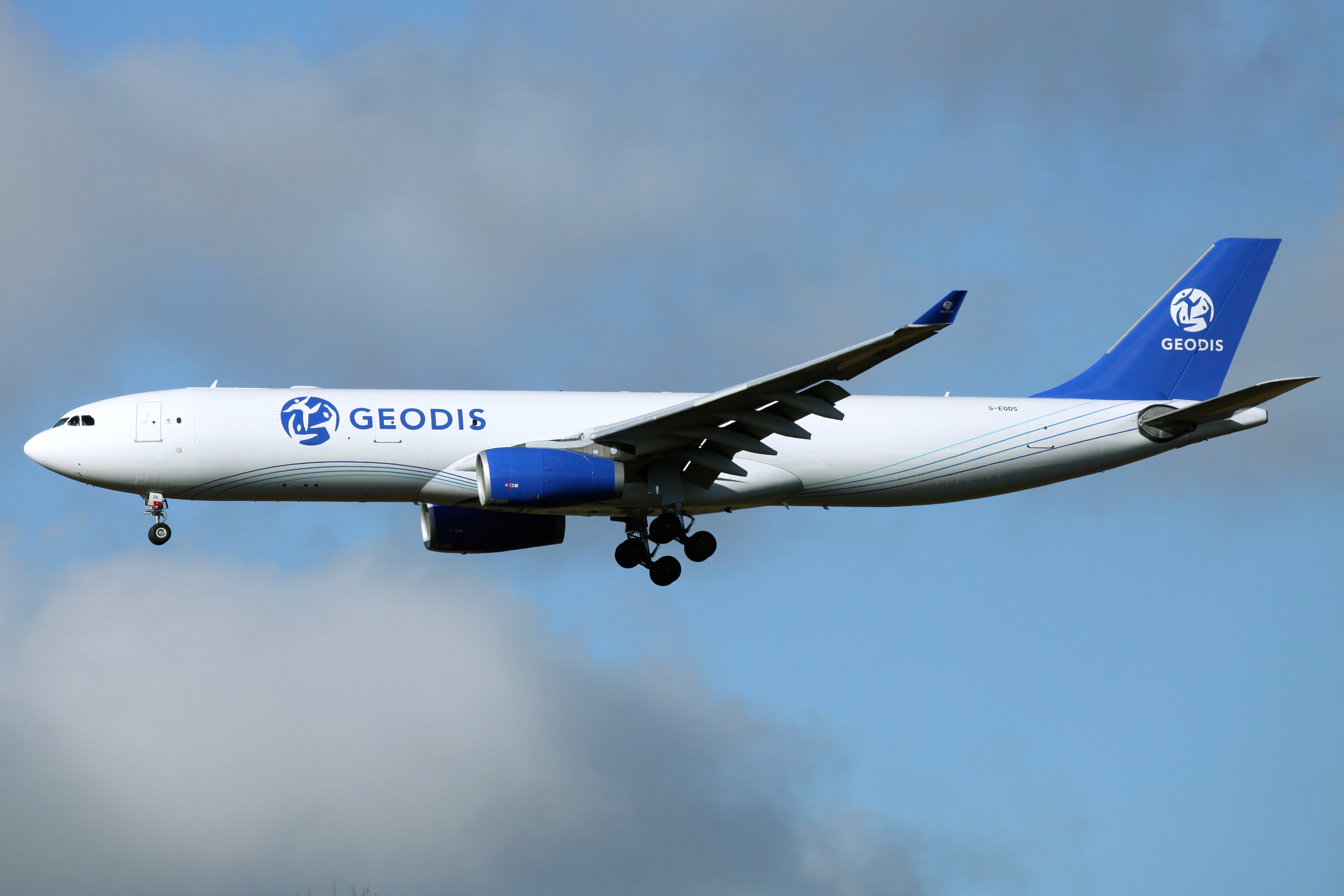
Titan Airways Airbus A330-300P2F operated in Geodis-livery

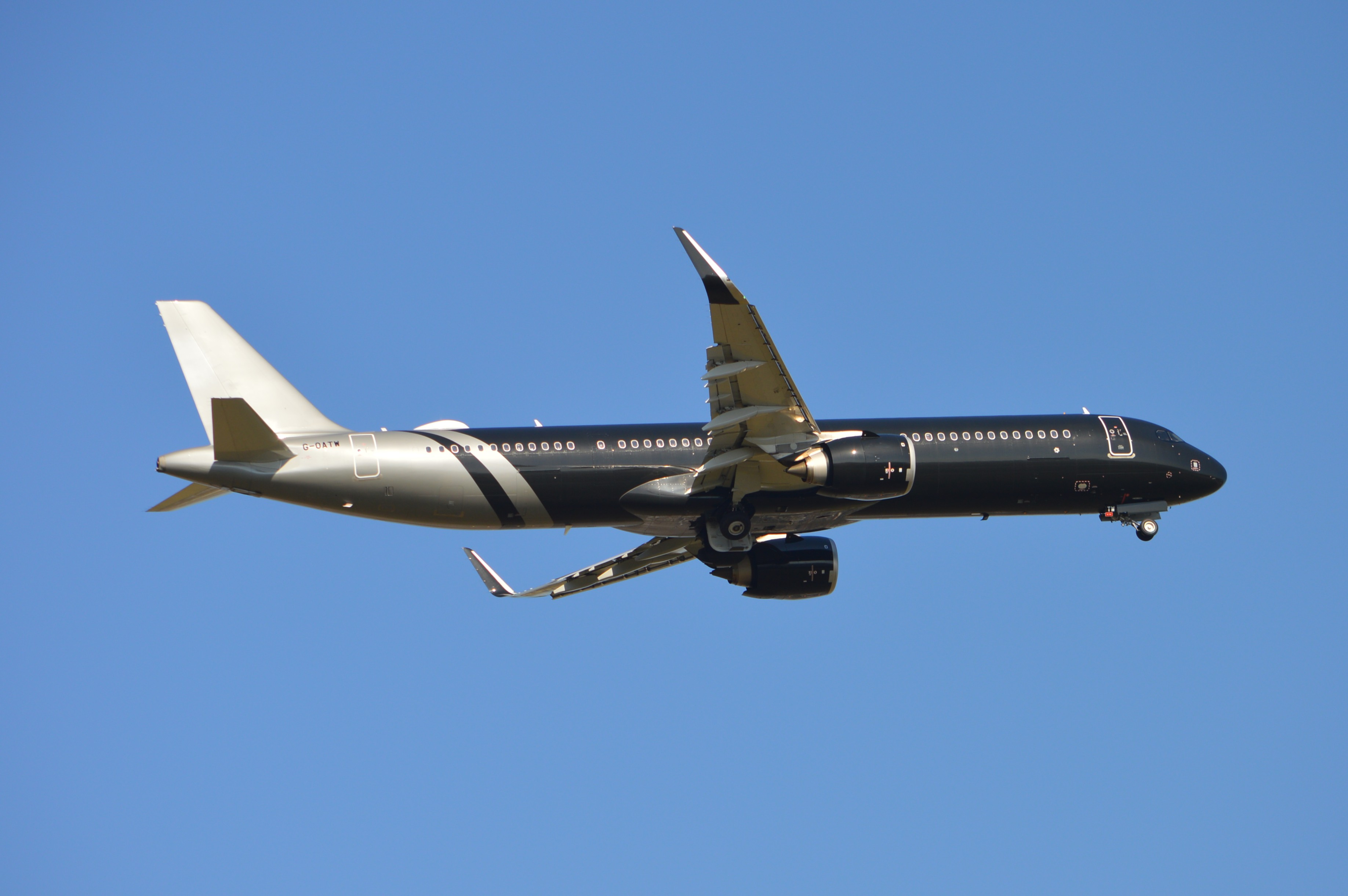
Titan Airways Airbus A321-253NX(LR) G-OATW in 2024

=== Airline sub-charter and lease ===
Titan Airways provides short, medium, or long term wet and damp lease operations worldwide to third party carriers. The UK carrier also operates short notice sub-charter services, with the ability to launch aircraft within sixty minutes when airline customers experience unexpected operational problems.

=== Tour operator flight series ===
Titan Airways operates charter flights on a seasonal basis to a number of destinations on behalf of UK-based tour operators and cruise-ship companies. Longstanding tour operator partnerships include regular operations from UK airports to Calvi in Corsica, Lourdes and Chambéry in France, Turin in Italy, Dalaman in Turkey, Preveza in Greece, and Banjul in the Gambia.

=== Ad hoc charter ===
Aside from these regular seasonal routes, Titan Airways operates long and short haul flights on an ad hoc basis on behalf of individuals, blue chip companies, Premier League football teams, high-profile personalities, and pop/rock groups. In September 2021, after a 19 months hiatus in filming due to the COVID-19 pandemic, the thirty-third series of the American version of The Amazing Race resumed, for the safety of the racers and the crew, instead of going back to taking commercial flights as they had done in the past, they used a Titan Airways Boeing 757 with an 'Amazing Race' livery. This was used again in the thirty-fourth series.

=== Corporate events ===
Titan Airways sometimes uses their aircraft in product launches, trade shows, promotional events, and hospitality trips for other companies.

=== Royal Mail ===
Titan Airways' cooperation with the Royal Mail dates back to the early 1990s, when operations began with the carrier's Short 360 and ATR 42 aircraft. In 1996, the carrier's BAe 146-200 fleet superseded the smaller aircraft, before being joined, and ultimately replaced, by Titan's Boeing 737-300QCs. The aircraft operated on behalf of the Royal Mail with nightly flights from Stansted to Edinburgh and to Belfast.

=== Government ===
Titan Airways operates flights for Home Office and the Foreign Office of the Government of the United Kingdom.

On 30 July 2020, Titan Airways' Boeing 757 became the largest passenger aircraft to land and depart from Saint Helena Airport. This flight was a repatriation mission on behalf of the British Government. A series of flights to Saint Helena and Ascension Island, once per month during the rest of 2020 and 2021, were performed with the same aircraft type. On 11 January 2021, one of Titan's Boeing 757 aircraft delivered 100 coronavirus vaccines to Saint Helena.

=== Military ===
Titan Airways' Boeing 767 operated the South Atlantic Air Bridge to the Falkland Islands on behalf of the UK Ministry of Defence (UK MoD) for two years until September 2012, with twice-weekly flights departing from (and returning to) RAF Brize Norton, in Oxfordshire, to RAF Mount Pleasant, with a mid-way refuelling stop at RAF Ascension Island. The South Atlantic Air Bridge service was subsequently taken over by AirTanker Services, operating a demodified demilitarised RAF Voyager (Airbus A330 MRTT).

In 2014, Titan Airways' RJ100 aircraft had been based in Sharjah on contract to the UK MoD since 2011. The RJ100 superseded Titan Airways' BAe 146 operations in the Persian Gulf region which dated back to 2009.

=== Geodis Air Network ===
In 2021, following significant air-freight capacity shortages due to the COVID-19 pandemic, Geodis Air Network leased an Airbus A330-300 converted freighter from JP Lease. The aircraft was operated by Titan Airways and is registered G-EODS. It is to fly between Amsterdam, London, Chicago, and Hong Kong.

== Fleet ==
=== Current fleet ===
Titan Airways Airbus A320-200

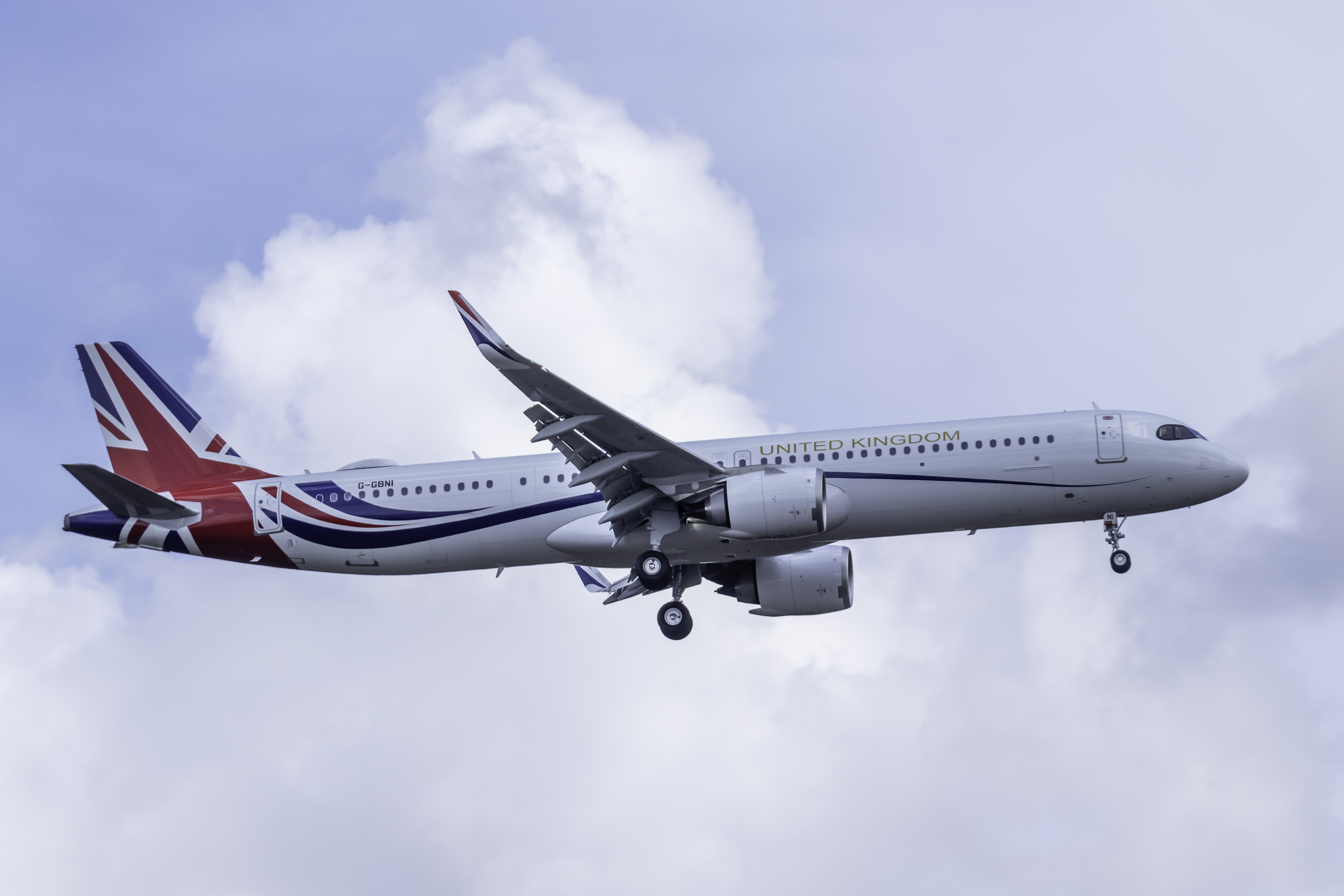
UK Government owned, Titan Airways operated Airbus A321-253neo in its VIP 'Global Britain' livery

As of August 2024, the Titan Airways fleet consisted of the following aircraft:

Titan Airways fleet
Aircraft	In service	Orders	Passengers	Notes
Airbus A320-200	2	—	168	
Airbus A320-200	2	—	180	
Airbus A321-200	2	—	218	
Airbus A321-200	2	—	220	
Airbus A321LR	3	—	—	
Embraer E190	1	—	100	
Cargo fleet
Airbus A321-200P2F	4	—	Cargo	
Airbus A330-300P2F	1	—	Cargo	
Cessna 408 SkyCourier	—	2	Combi	
total	13	2		

- Note: Titan Airways also operates an Airbus A321-253neo, registration G-GBNI (as a nod to Great Britain and Northern Ireland), MSN 10238, owned by the UK Government (originally owned by Titan Airways from 2021 to 2022, subsequently purchased by the UK Government) and converted to VIP configuration with a 'Global Britain' livery (identical to Vespina, the VIP-converted RAF Voyager multi-role tanker transport aircraft), for members of the British royal family, Prime Minister, and senior government ministers.

=== Titan Airways Malta ===
As of July 2026, Titan Airways Malta operates the following aircraft:

Aircraft	In service	Orders	Notes
Airbus A321P2F	3	—	
Total	3	—	

=== Former fleet ===
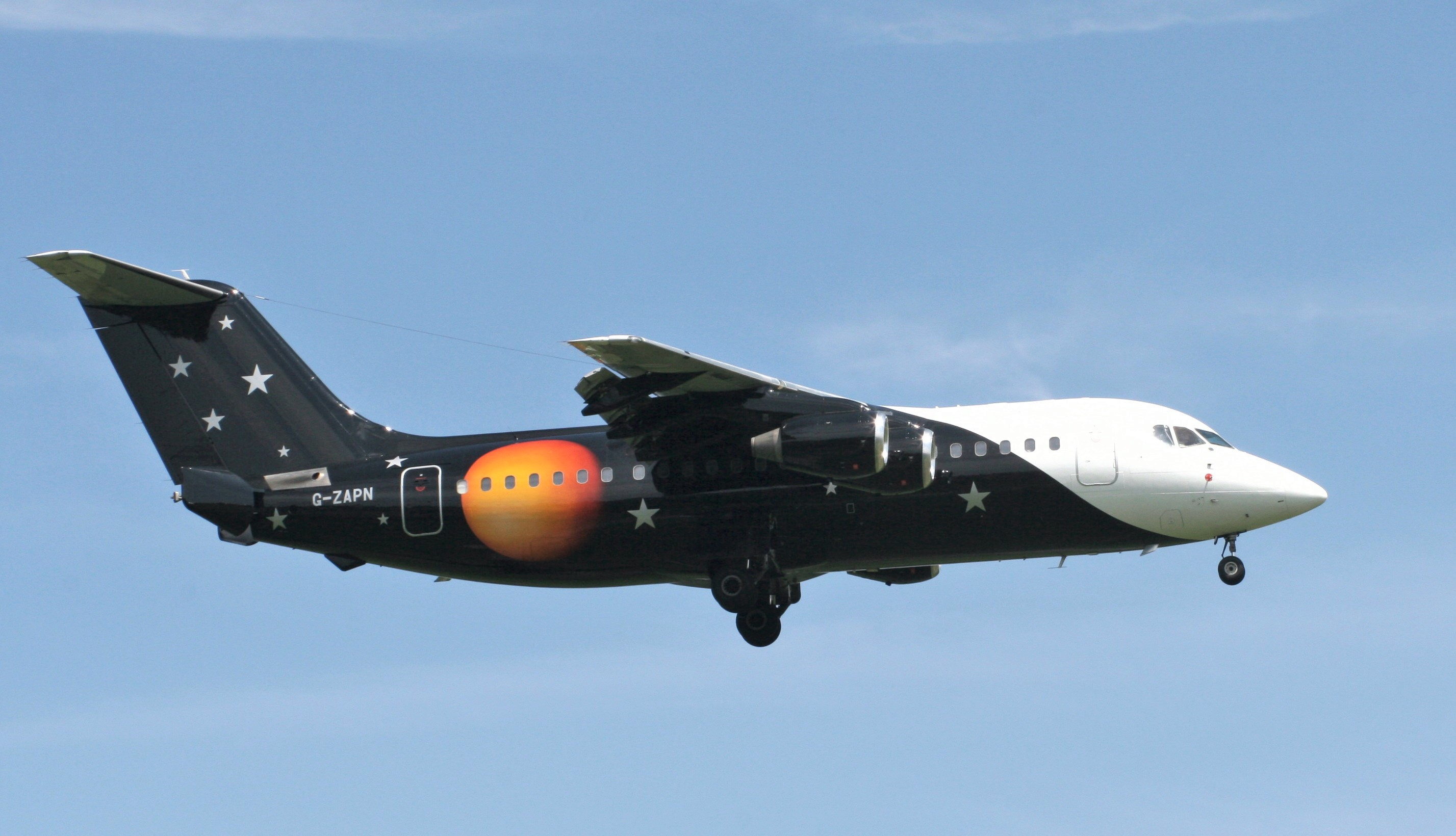
Titan Airways BAe 146-200QC G-ZAPN in 2007

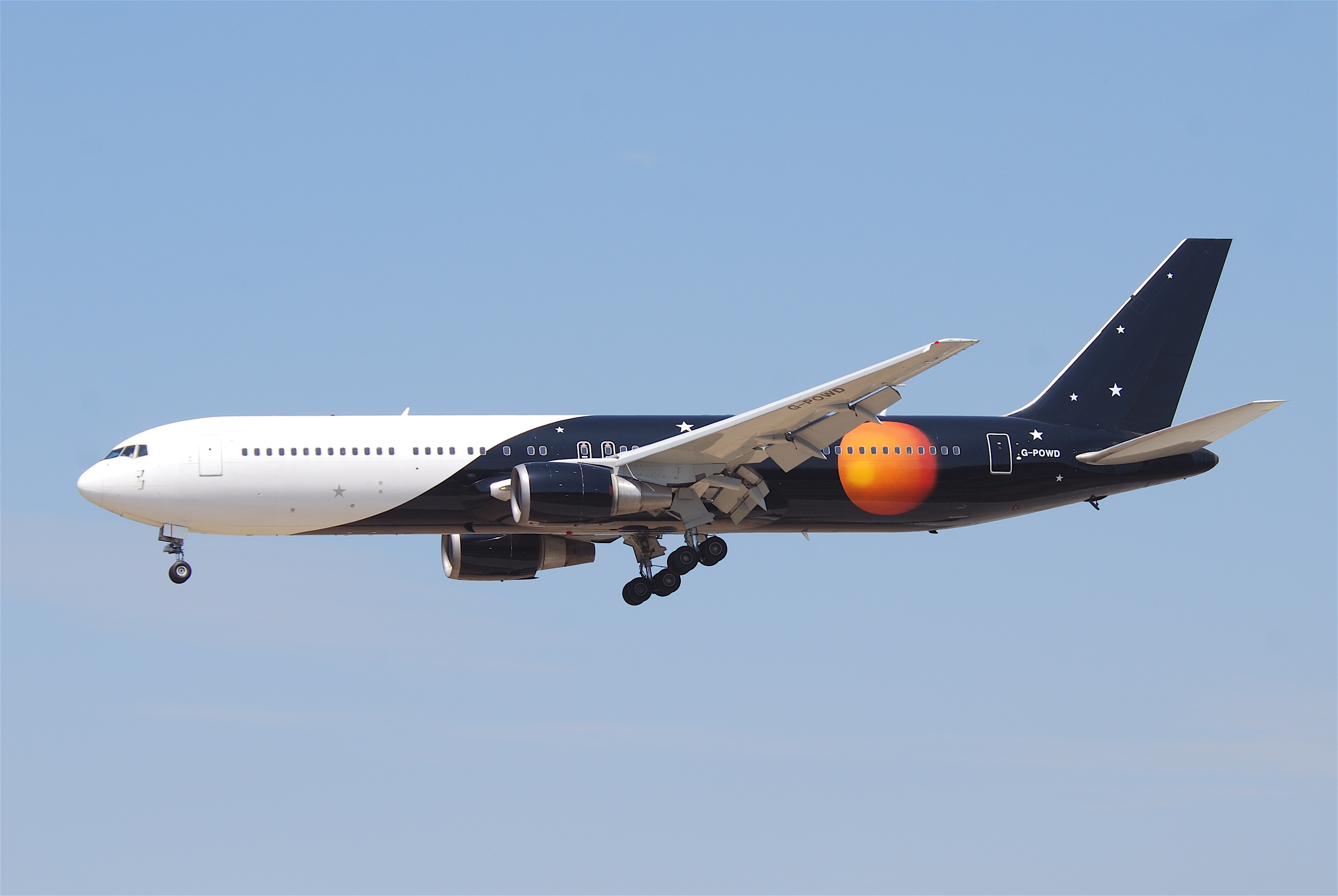
Titan Airways Boeing 767-300ER G-POWD in 2011

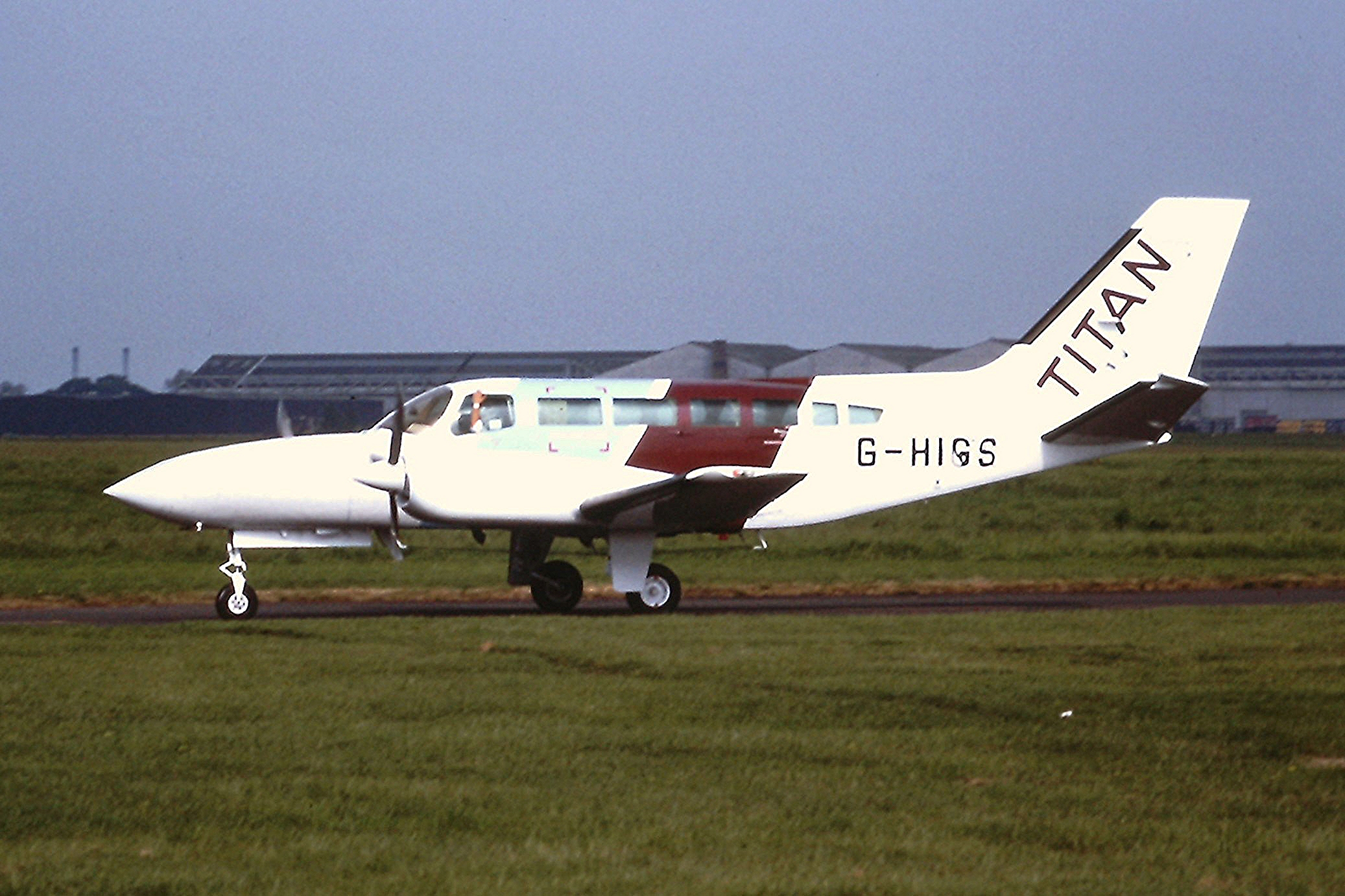
Titan Airways' first aircraft, Cessna 404 Titan G-HIGS in 1989

Titan Airways former fleet
Aircraft	Number	Introduced	Retired	Notes
Agusta A109E	1	2007	2014	
Airbus A318-100	1	2017	2021	
Airbus A320-200	1	2013	2017	
ATR 42-300	2	1994	2005	
Avro RJ100	1	2011	2013	
BAe 146-200	5	1996	2013	1x 200, 3x 200QC, 1x 200QT
BAe 146-300	1	2009	2010	
Boeing 737-100	1	1999	2007	
Boeing 737-300	4	1999	2018	1x 300F, 3x 300QC
Boeing 737-400	2	2018	2023	2x 400SF
Boeing 757-200	4	2003	2023	
Boeing 767-300ER	1	2009	2020	
Cessna 404 Titan	2	1988	1992	
Cessna 525A CitationJet CJ2+	1	2011	2015	(Note: Company hack G-POWG which, despite operating in full Titan livery, was never registered to them.)
Embraer 110 Bandeirante	1	1988	1993	
Short 330	4	1990	1997	2x 100, 2x 200
Short 360-100	1	1993	1997	

== Accidents and incidents ==
On 26 February 2020, a Titan Airways Airbus A321-211 suffered an engine surge immediately after takeoff from Gatwick Airport. Shortly after, the other engine stalled, the aircraft landed safely at Gatwick eleven minutes after takeoff. The Air Accidents Investigation Branch (AAIB) determined fuel contamination following defective maintenance undetected for two days had caused the incident. Safety recommendations were made to the European Union Aviation Safety Agency (EASA), and changes made by organisations including Airbus and the International Air Transport Association (IATA).
