= Channel Tunnel fire =

There have been several fires in vehicles being transported through the Channel Tunnel since its opening in 1994. As of 2022 all were caused by lorries carried on the heavy goods vehicle shuttle trains. As the safety measures in such cases mostly work as intended, nobody has thus far died as a result of any of those fires.

- 1996 Channel Tunnel fire, which burned for over seven hours on 18 November 1996.
- 2006 Channel Tunnel fire, which closed the tunnel for a short period on 21 August 2006.
- 2008 Channel Tunnel fire, which burned for sixteen hours on 11 September 2008.
- 2012 Channel Tunnel fire, which closed the tunnel for a short period on 29 November 2012.
- 2015 Channel Tunnel fire, which burned the midsection of Running Tunnel North on 17 January 2015.
