= Channel Tunnel Safety Authority =

British-French transport regulatory agency

The Channel Tunnel Safety Authority is an international regulatory body responsible for safety in the Channel Tunnel.

The CTSA was established by the Treaty of Canterbury. It advises the Intergovernmental Commission on safety matters, and ensures that safety rules in the Channel Tunnel are in line with prevailing safety laws. The CTSA has five members from France, and five from the UK; leadership alternates annually.

== History ==
The Channel Tunnel Safety Authority (CTSA) has its origins in article 11 of the Anglo-French Treaty of Canterbury enacted in 1986, while further details were specified with an associated concession agreement. The organisation was created with the specific responsibility for safety in the design, construction, and operation of the Channel Tunnel. The CTSA formulated the safety regime not only of the tunnel itself but also the requirements for all rolling stock that travel through it. It is supervised by the Intergovernmental Commission (IGC) that representing both the British and French governments. Unique among governmental safety agencies, owing to its responsibility for safety in the design, construction and operation of a single project.

In 1988, the CTSA's chairman informed Eurotunnel that a more systematic approach to risk analysis was necessary. Despite the lack of completion of studies into the tunnel's vulnerability to severe earthquakes, by 1993, the authority was prepared to permit the tunnel to be declared complete. Upon the Channel Tunnel's completion in 1994, the CTSA performed a comprehensive evaluation, during which it determined that the installed equipment had satisfied the required safety and performance expectations. Furthermore, it confirmed that Eurotunnel's personnel had been trained and certified to perform all procedures, along with knowledge of the relevant safety rules. An audit of the safety case and associated arrangements was also performed to ensure the required level of safety had been met.

Even before the project's onset, experts had identified fire as the greatest hazard posed to the tunnel's operation. Accordingly, various measures were incorporated into the safety regime, from operating procedures to the design of the tunnel itself, to help mitigate the dangers posed by such a fire. As a result of the many preventive measures in the CT design, the likelihood of a fire breaking out to begin with was determined to be relatively small.

Following the 1996 Channel Tunnel fire, the CTSA investigated the incident and made multiple recommendations for improvements. It was found that the alarm had not been urgently responded to as staff sought confirmation; thus it was recommended that all alarms are to be treated seriously. As control room staff were perceived to have been overwhelmed, additional staff were placed on duty. Eurotunnel's policy of attempting to drive trains through the tunnel in the event of an on-board fire was replaced by plans to bring trains to a controlled stop and evacuate occupants into the service tunnel. Liaison between Eurotunnel and emergency services was improved with joint exercises and exchanges of personnel between the British and French fire brigades, so that each had experience with the other's operational procedures. Communications were also improved and updated safety documentation issued.

Over the years, the CTSA has conducted numerous experimental trials and studies, both of its own design or having been commissioned to do so by Eurotunnel. The details of many of these tests, including their results and the conditions they were performed under, are typically kept secret on grounds of commercial confidentiality; while this usually precludes peer reviews, government authorities can demand the release of such information if they so desire.

In 2010, Eurostar selected Siemens as the preferred bidder to supply 10 Siemens Velaro e320 sixteen-car trainsets that would be built to satisfy Channel Tunnel regulations. The French train manufacturer Alstom launched legal action to prevent Eurostar from proceeding, claiming that the Siemens sets ordered would breach Channel Tunnel safety rules, Following the approval of safety rule changes which would permit Eurostar to operate the Velaro sets within the tunnel, the French government dismissed their delegate to the CTSA and brought in a replacement.

== See also ==
- European Railway Agency
- 1996 Channel Tunnel fire
- 2008 Channel Tunnel fire
