= Eurostar =

High-speed train service in Western Europe

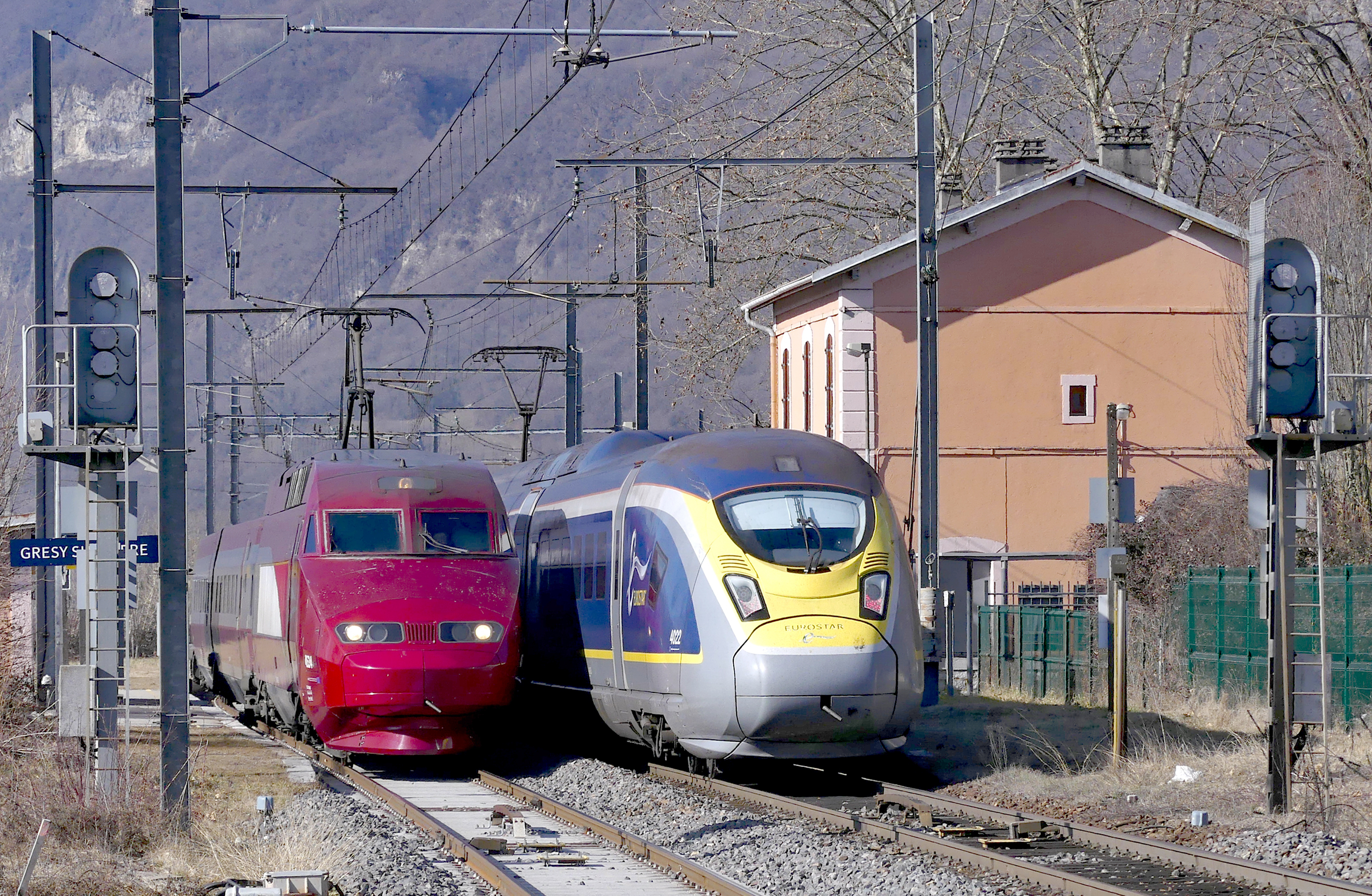
- Left: Eurostar PBA used for services within continental Europe. Right: Eurostar e320 used for cross-channel services.

Overview
- Main stations: Amsterdam; Brussels; Cologne; Lille; London; Paris; Rotterdam
- Fleet: PBA × 9; PBKA × 17; e300 × 17; e320 × 17
- Stations called at: 28
- Parent company: Eurostar Group
- Key people: CEO: Gwendoline Cazenave (since 1 October 2022)
- Reporting mark: ES

Technical
- Track gauge: 1,435 mm (4 ft 8 1/2 in) standard gauge
- Electrification: Overhead line: 25 kV 50 Hz AC; 15 kV 16.7 Hz AC; 1,500 V DC; 3,000 V DC

Other
- Website: www.eurostar.com

Eurostar is an international high-speed rail service in Western Europe, connecting Belgium, France, Germany, the Netherlands, and the United Kingdom through the Channel Tunnel.

The service is operated by the Eurostar Group which was formed from the merger of Eurostar, which operated trains through the Channel Tunnel to the United Kingdom, and Thalys which operated entirely within continental Europe.

Eurostar has transported over 400 million passengers since services began in 1994, including a record 20 million passengers in 2025. The operator is exploring future network expansions and aims to double passenger numbers between 2022 and 2030.

Since 1998, Eurostar has won multiple World Travel Awards, including the World's Leading Passenger Rail Operator on 15 consecutive occasions, alongside awards recognising its environmental and sustainability practices from organisations including Network Rail, The Sunday Times, PETA, and the Chartered Institution of Railway Operators.

== History ==
=== Early planning and construction (1986–1993) ===
Proposals for a cross-Channel tunnel date back to as early as 1802, but concerns over national security delayed development. The modern project was initiated following the 1986 Treaty of Canterbury between France and the UK, with the creation of Eurotunnel to manage and own the tunnel. Tunnelling began in 1988.

In addition to the tunnel's shuttle trains carrying cars and lorries between Folkestone and Calais, the tunnel opened up the possibility of through passenger and freight train services between places further afield. British Rail and France's SNCF contracted with Eurotunnel to use half the tunnel's capacity for this purpose. In 1987, Britain, France and Belgium set up an international project group to specify a train to provide an international high-speed passenger service through the tunnel. French TGV technology was chosen as the basis for the new trains. An order for 30 train sets, to be manufactured in France but with some British and Belgian components, was placed in December 1989.

France had been operating high-speed TGV services since 1981, and following the Treaty of Canterbury, began preparations for a new, 333 km-long (207 mi) high-speed line headed north from Paris, to speed up connections to the tunnel, as well as to Brussels. The LGV Nord (French: Ligne à Grande Vitesse Nord, English: north high-speed line) opened in 1993.

On 20 June 1993, the first Eurostar test train travelled through the tunnel to the UK. Various technical difficulties in running the new trains on British tracks were quickly overcome.

On 6 May 1994, the tunnel was formally opened by Britain's Queen Elizabeth II and French president François Mitterrand, at a final cost of £4.65 billion (€5.99 billion) (equivalent to £9.8 billion in 2025).

=== Launch and early operations (1994–2002) ===
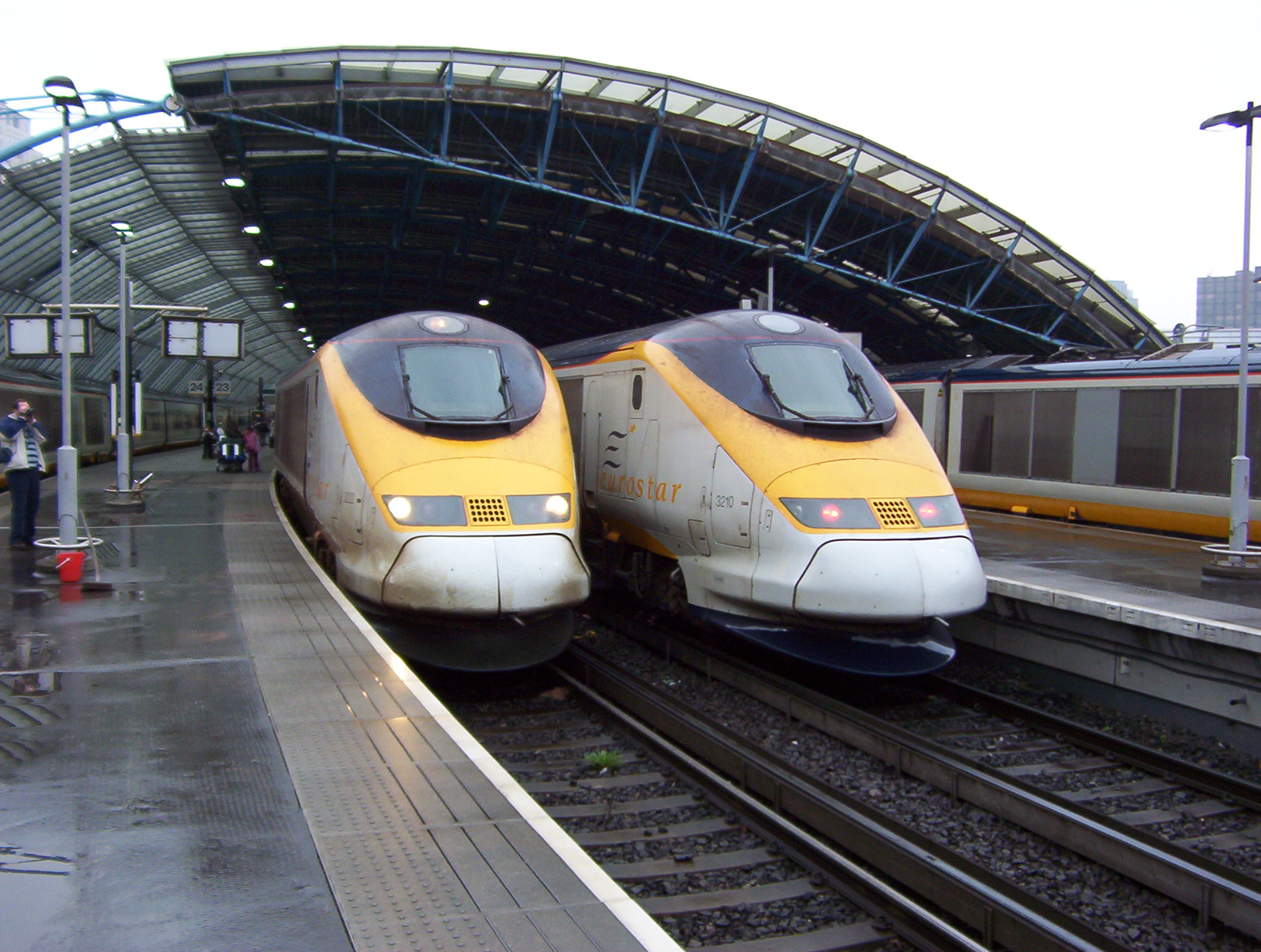
A pair of Eurostar trains at the former Waterloo International station

On 14 November 1994, Eurostar services began running from Waterloo International station in London, to Paris Nord, as well as to Brussels-South railway station. The train service started with a limited Discovery service; the full daily service started on 28 May 1995, with a typical Waterloo-Paris Nord trip taking 2 hours and 55 minutes, with an average end-to-end speed of 171.5 km/h (106.6 mph) from London to Paris.

On 8 January 1996, Eurostar launched services from a second railway station in the UK, Ashford International, and on 29 June announced year-round services from London to Disneyland Paris.

In 1997, Eurostar introduced services to the French Alps during the winter. On December 14, the Belgian HSL 1 opened, connecting Brussels to the French LGV Nord at Lille. The line was 88 km (55 mi) long (of which 71 km (44 mi) was dedicated high-speed tracks, and 17 km (11 mi) modernised lines), and brought down London-Brussels travel times by 45 minutes.

On 20 July 2002 a summer seasonal service from London to Avignon-Centre was launched.

=== High Speed 1 and St Pancras relocation (2003–2007) ===
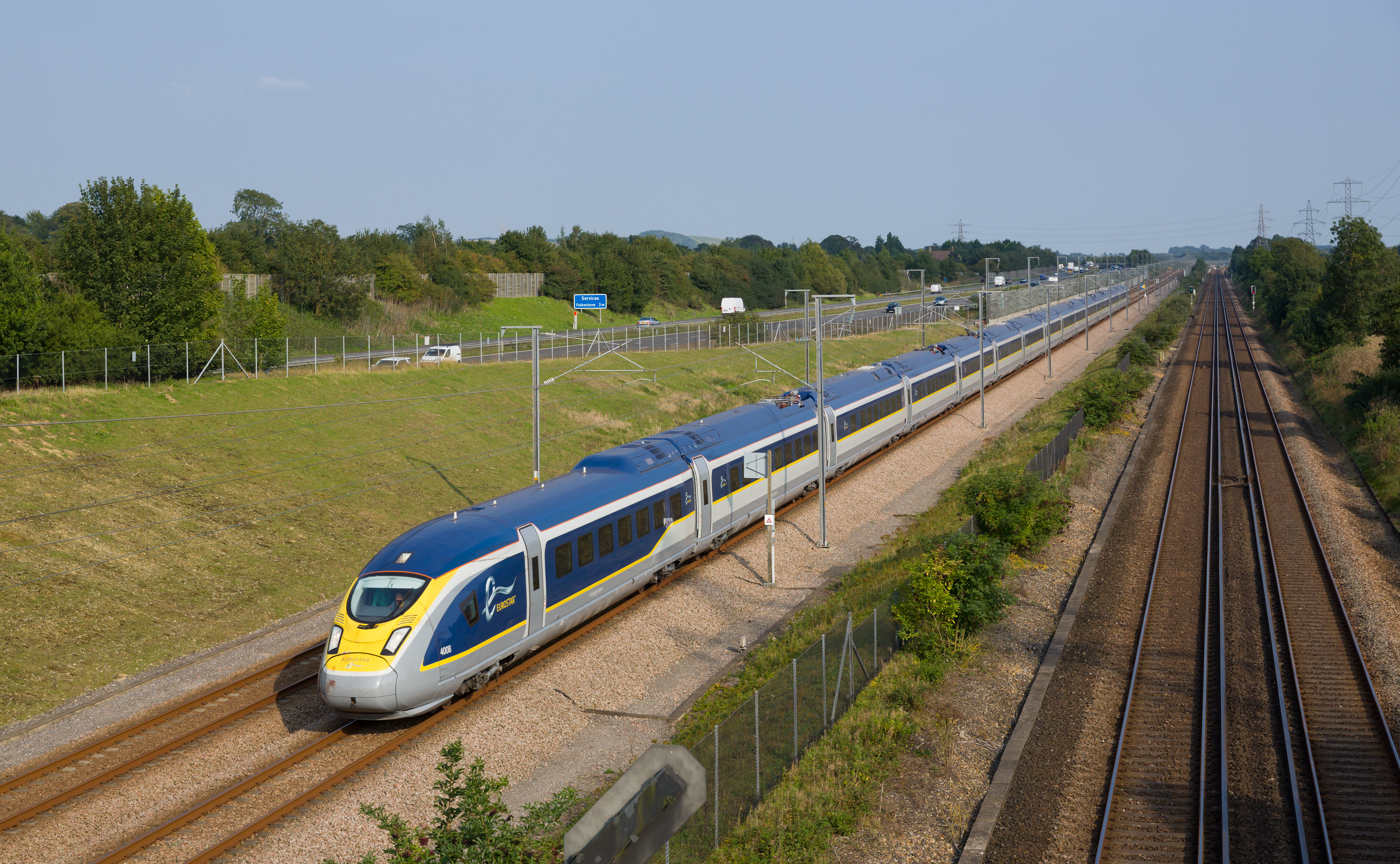
Eurostar train on High Speed 1 near Sellindge in Kent

The first decade of operations was somewhat rocky, with one commentator summarising it thus:

In June 2003, Eurostar was battling to recover from the worst period in its 10-year history. Negative media coverage combined with poor sales and the general public's low opinion of the British rail industry, created a major challenge... Eurostar was finding it difficult to pick itself up from one of the worst periods in its decade-long history. The period post 9/11 had sent the business into a downturn. Passenger numbers were drying up due to worries over international travel. Several management changes had led to a pause in strategy. Punctuality had suffered badly because of wider problems with the UK's rail infrastructure.

Over the next few years, the gradual opening of the High Speed 1 tracks in the UK made Eurostar increasingly competitive with airlines on speed, and led to improvements in overall service. On 23 September 2003, passenger services began running on the first completed section of High Speed 1 (shortening travel times by 21 minutes), with the full line open on 14 November 2007 (further shortening journeys by 20 minutes).

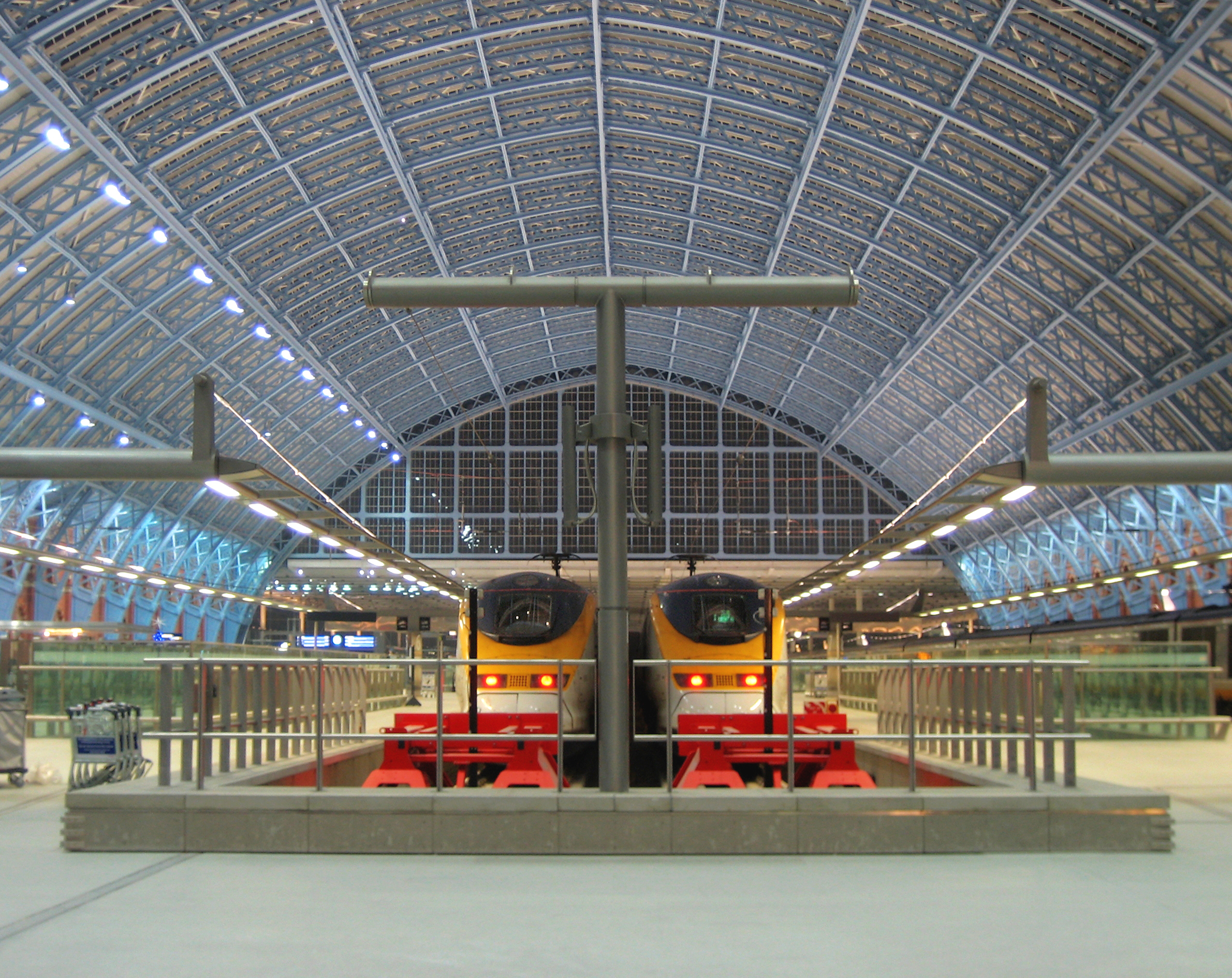
Eurostar trains in the renovated train shed at London St Pancras International

Following a high-profile glamorous opening ceremony and a large advertising campaign, on 14 November 2007, Eurostar services in London transferred from Waterloo to the extended and extensively refurbished London St Pancras International. The redevelopment cost £800 million (€1.17 billion) notably to cope with the 394 m (431 yd) long Eurostar trains. From St Pancras, the journey to Paris Nord reached its current travel time of 2 hours and 15 minutes.

=== Network expansion (2008–2019) ===
In 2009, the UK government nationalised London and Continent Railways, including the UK's stake in Eurostar. In 2015, the UK Government completed its sale of this stake for £757 million (€1 billion), leaving Eurostar to be owned by France's SNCF (55%) and Belgium's SNCB (5%), with the rest between Caisse de dépôt et placement du Québec (CDPQ) (30%) and Hermes Infrastructure (10%).

On 1 May 2015, the operator launched a year-round service from London to Lyon, Avignon, and Marseille in southern France, replacing an earlier seasonal service to Avignon that had run from 2002 to 2014. The new service brought Lyon within 4.5 hours of London, Avignon within 6 hours and Marseille in 6.5 hours.

On 4 April 2018, Eurostar launched direct services from London to Amsterdam (3h41) and Rotterdam (3h01), marking the first extension of Eurostar services to a new country since the original routes to France and Belgium in 1994. The service initially operated as a one-way journey, with return passengers required to change trains at Brussels until juxtaposed border controls could be established at Dutch stations; the full direct return service commenced on 26 October 2020.

=== COVID-19 pandemic impact (2020–2022) ===
The COVID-19 pandemic, and notably international travel restrictions, led to an existential crisis for Eurostar. By January 2021, Eurostar ridership went down to less than 1% of pre-pandemic levels.

During the COVID-19 crisis, the company was "seen as French by the British government and as British by the French," meaning that it mostly did not benefit from state support given to airlines or other train companies. Indeed, even though Eurostar continued to be headquartered in London, the British had sold their stake in the company in 2015, leaving France's SNCF as the main shareholder. In the end, Eurostar was able to borrow £250 million (€291 million) from the French government, but was forced also to borrow £500 million (€582 million) from commercial lenders at higher rates.

By the end of 2022, Eurostar had debts of €964m, but had finally returned to pre-COVID ridership levels. In 2022/23, Eurostar returned to profitability. Since the COVID-19 pandemic, Eurostar has ended service to certain stations and routes, with a strategic focus on the most profitable routes.

=== Merger with Thalys (2019–2023) ===
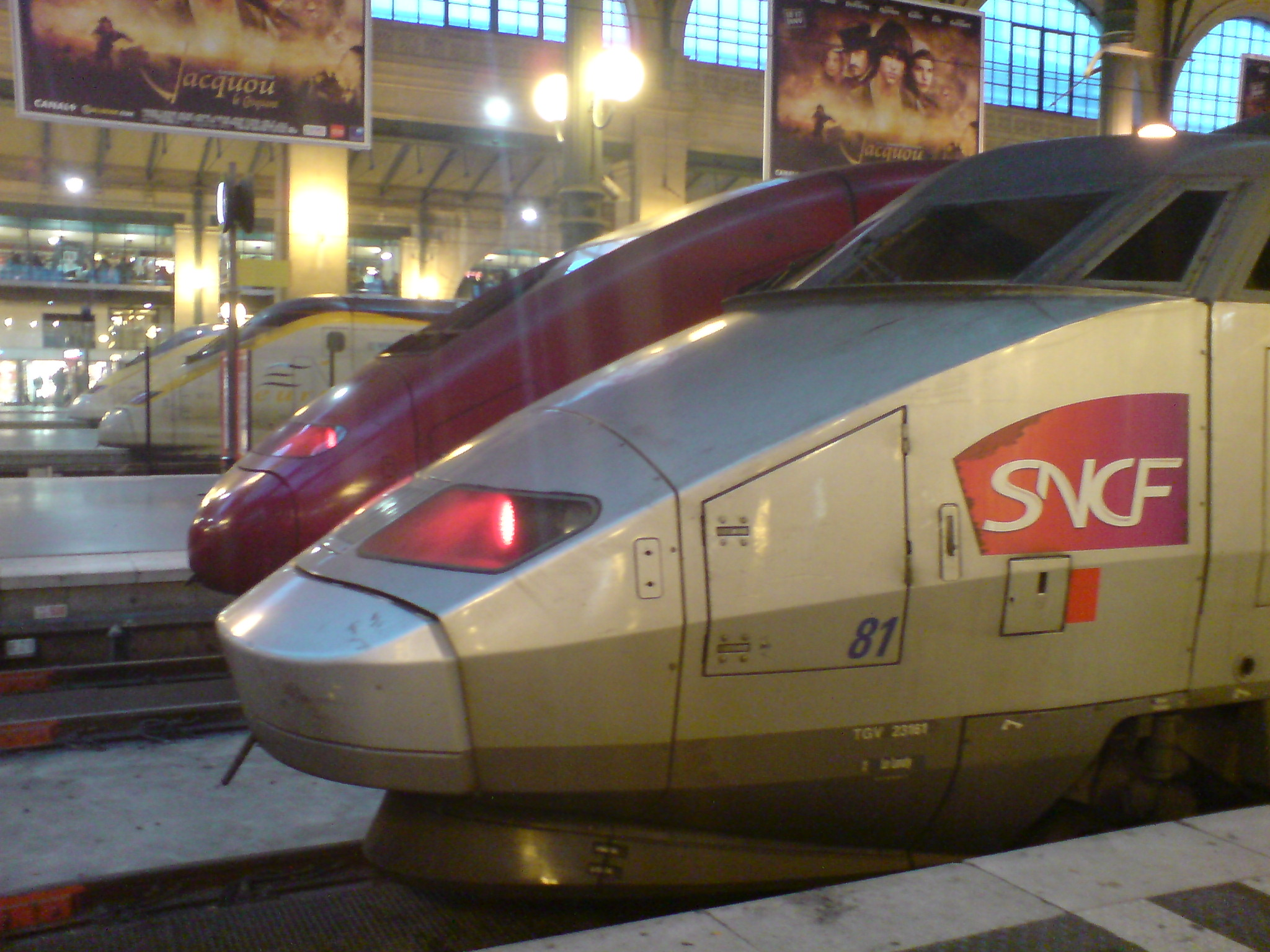
Two Eurostar trains, a Thalys train, and a TGV train side by side at Paris Nord

On 27 September 2019, the heads of two of Eurostar's major shareholders, Guillaume Pepy of SNCF, and the chair of SNCB, Sophie Dutordoir, announced that Eurostar was planning to come together with its sister company, the Franco-Belgian transnational rail service Thalys, under the title of "Green Speed".

In September 2020, the merger between Thalys and Eurostar International was confirmed, subject to gaining European Commission clearance, to form "Green Speed". In October 2021, it was announced that, following the completion of the merger, the Thalys brand would be discontinued, with all of the new operation's services to be operated under the Eurostar name but with each service's own liveries.

In October 2023, the Eurostar brand replaced Thalys, operating as one network and combining ticket sales in a single system.

=== Debt refinancing, new trains and potential expansion ===
In April 2024, Eurostar refinanced its existing debt of €964m, leading to a new total debt level of €650m. This new deal was the result of strong revenues, and a new green term loan.

In 2025, Eurostar announced that the purchase of 50 new trains would also allow for the creation of new routes by the early 2030s, including direct services from London to Frankfurt, from London to Switzerland, and from Amsterdam/Brussels to Geneva. In 2026, an agreement between Eurostar, SBB and SNCF paved the way for potential connections from London to Geneva, Zurich and Basel.

In 2026, Eurostar announced that seats could now be booked from London to Antwerp Central starting 14 December 2026. In the reverse direction, passengers would have to go to Brussels first to go through border controls.

== Routes and infrastructure ==
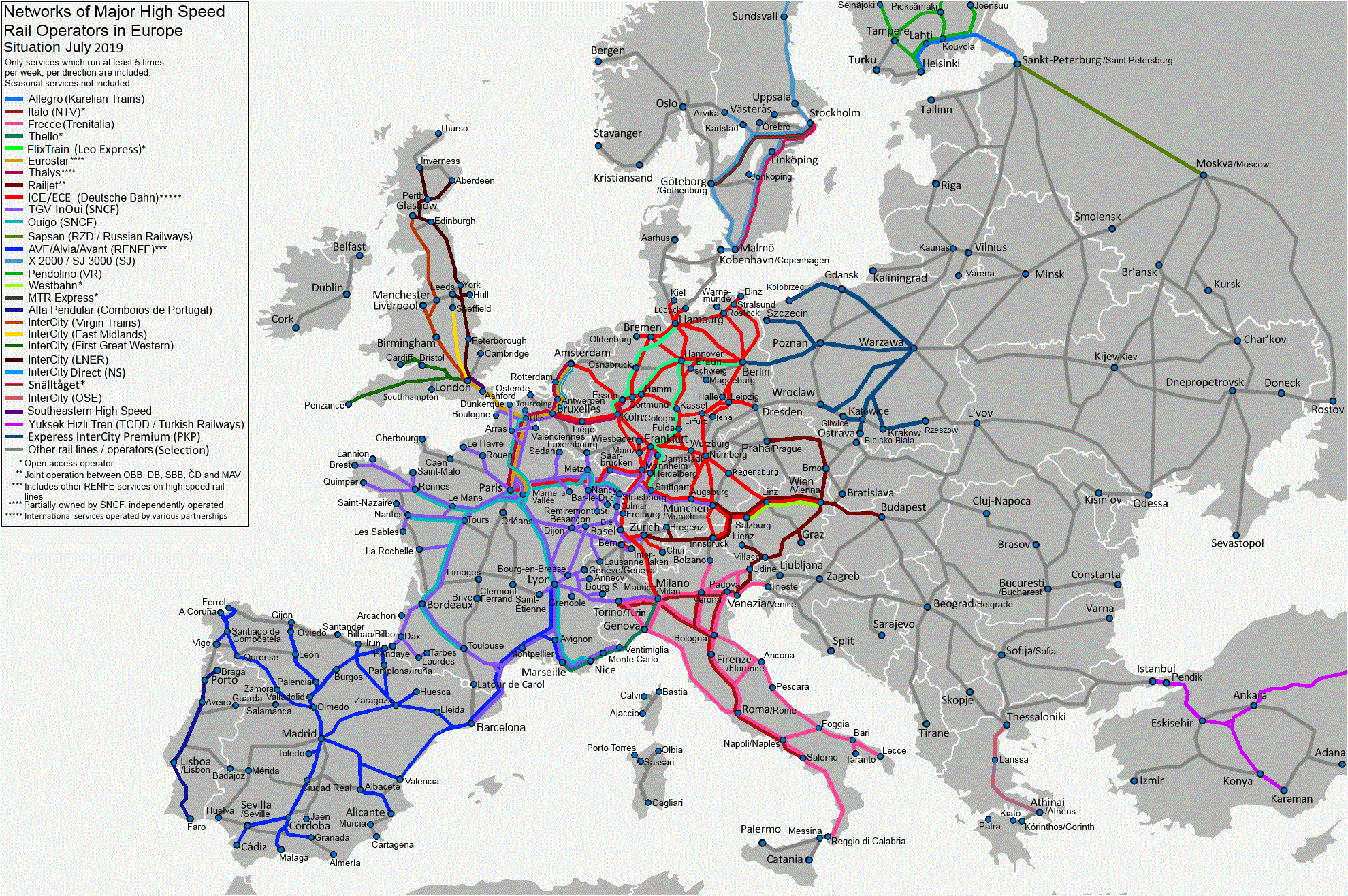
Networks of major high speed rail operators in Europe. Eurostar shown in dark yellow

Following Eurostar's merger with Thalys in 2023, Eurostar serves the following destinations as of January 2026 [daily frequencies in each direction specified for the week of 2 February 2026]:

- Departing from London St Pancras (the historic Eurostar network):
  - Paris-Nord [12 daily non-stop services],
  - Lille-Europe [6 weekday, 8 weekend services] (with structured connections to Bourg-Saint-Maurice on Saturdays in the winter, as part of Eurostar Snow),
  - Brussels-South [8-9 services],
  - Amsterdam-Central via Rotterdam-Central [4-5 services] and via Antwerp Central [4-5 services starting December 2026. Direct service only on cross-Channel routes coming from London],

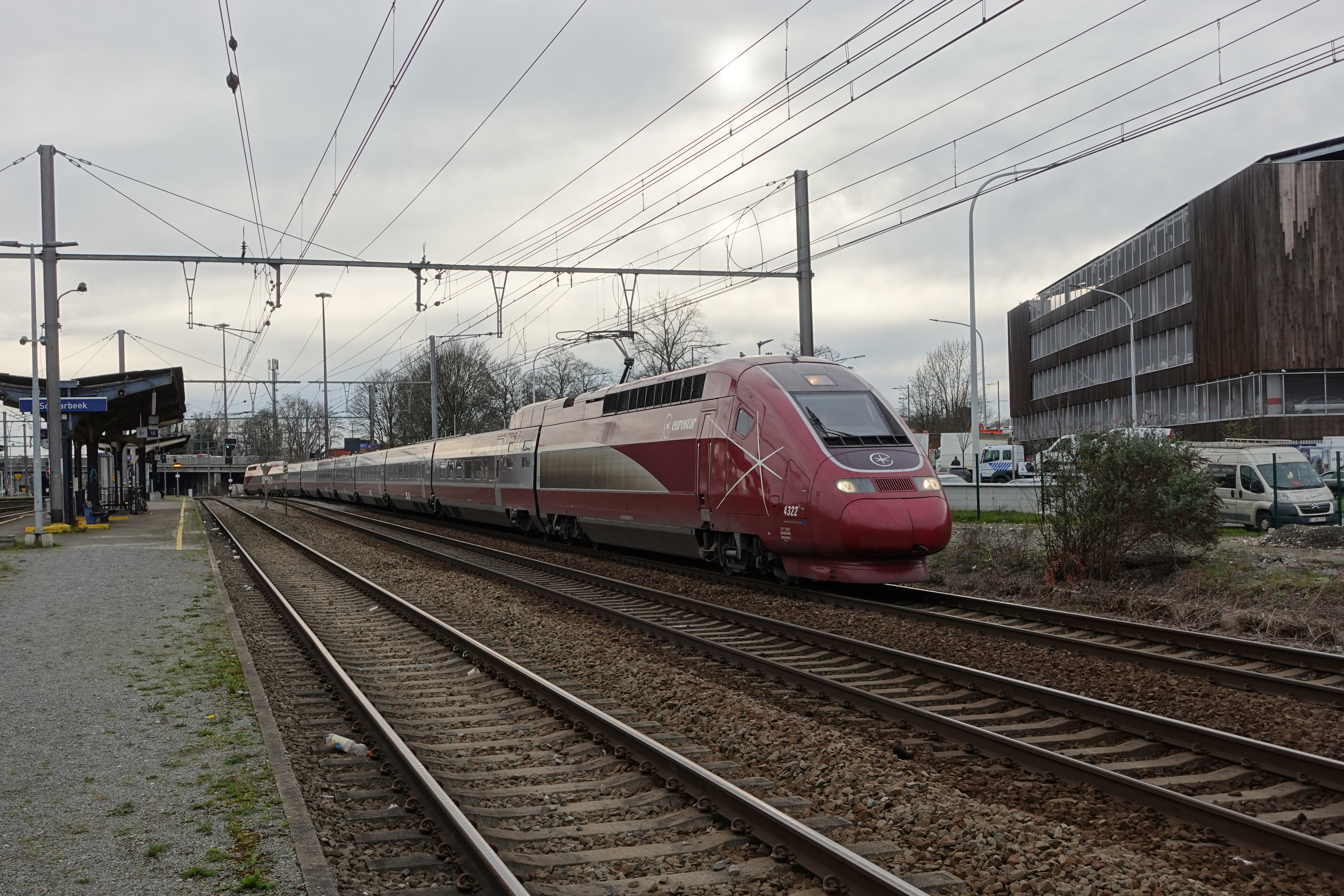
PBKA stock passing through Schaerbeek station between Brussels-South and Amsterdam-Central

- Departing from Paris-Nord (historically Thalys):
  - Brussels-South, [22-32 services],
  - Amsterdam-Central via Brussels-South, Antwerp-Central, Rotterdam-Central and Schiphol-Airport [12-15 services],
  - Cologne via Brussels-South, Liège-Guillemins and Aachen [4-6 services],
  - beyond Cologne: Düsseldorf, Düsseldorf Airport, Duisburg, Essen and Dortmund,
- departing from Amsterdam-Central and Brussels-South (historically Thalys):
  - Marne-la-Vallée - Chessy via Charles-de-Gaulle 2 Airport - TGV [2-3 services],
  - Bourg-Saint-Maurice via Chambéry - Challes-les-Eaux, Albertville, Moûtiers - Salins - Brides-les-Bains, Aime-La Plagne and Landry (as part of Eurostar Snow on Saturdays in the winter) [weekly service during the winter]

=== Key high-speed lines used ===
Line	Country	Connecting	Length	Max speed	Opened	Reference
Channel Tunnel	UK-France	Folkestone – Coquelles	50.46 km (31.35 mi)	160 km/h (100 mph) (safety)	1994	
High Speed 1	UK	Channel Tunnel – London	108 km (67 mi)	300 km/h (185 mph)	2003/2007	
LGV Nord	France	Channel Tunnel – Lille	111 km (69 mi)	300 km/h (185 mph)	1993	
LGV Nord	France	Belgian Border – Lille	12 km (7.5 mi)	300 km/h (185 mph)	1993	
LGV Nord	France	Lille – Gonesse	198 km (123 mi)	300 km/h (185 mph)	1993	
HSL 1	Belgium	French border – Lembeek	71 km (44 mi)	300 km/h (185 mph)	1997	
HSL 1	Belgium	Lembeek – Brussels	17 km (11 mi)	200 km/h (125 mph)	1997	
HSL 2	Belgium	Brussels – Leuven	34 km (21 mi)	200 km/h (125 mph)	2002	
HSL 2	Belgium	Leuven – Ans	61 km (38 mi)	300 km/h (185 mph)	2002	
HSL 3	Belgium	Brussels – Antwerp	47 km (29 mi)	160 km/h (100 mph)	2009	
HSL 3	Belgium	Antwerp – Dutch border	40 km (25 mi)	300 km/h (185 mph)	2009	
HSL-Zuid	Netherlands	Amsterdam – Belgian border	125 km (78 mi)	300 km/h (185 mph)	2009	
Cologne–Aachen Line	Germany	Aachen – Düren	31 km (19 mi)	sections at 160 km/h (100 mph)		
Cologne–Aachen Line	Germany	Düren – Cologne	39 km (24 mi)	250 km/h (155 mph)	2003	

=== Connections ===
==== Same-station transfers ====
Since the merger between Eurostar and Thalys, Brussels-South has emerged as a central node of the Eurostar network, notably allowing for transfers for passengers from cities that are not directly connected by Eurostar (such as Western German cities and London, for example). In addition, as of January 2026, transfers are possible to local trains and services with these operators:

- At Brussels-South, transfers are possible with Deutsche Bahn, SNCB, SNCF, NS and European Sleeper.
- At London St. Pancras, same-station connections are possible with Southeastern, East Midlands Railway and Thameslink. The construction of a new concourse at the adjacent London King's Cross improved interchange with London St Pancras and provided easier connections to London North Eastern Railway, Great Northern, Hull Trains and Grand Central services.
- At Amsterdam Centraal, connections are possible with Deutsche Bahn, NS, ÖBB, Arriva and European Sleeper.
- Paris Gare du Nord offers a number of SNCF services.
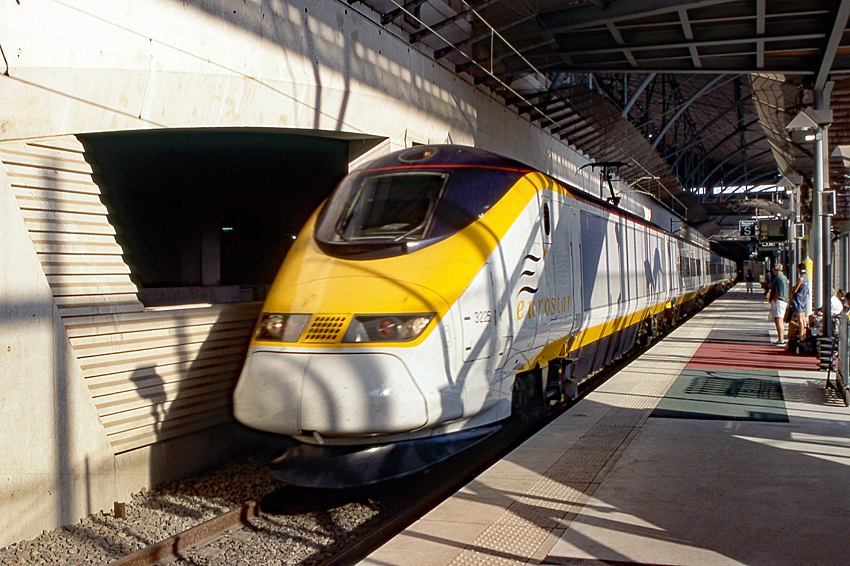
- Eurostar Class 373 at Lille-Europe, an interchange with other TGV services
  At Lille-Europe, transfers are possible with SNCF routes. Lille-Flandres is also 500 meters away with SNCB services, as well as additional SNCF services.
- At Rotterdam Centraal, transfers are possible to NS, and European Sleeper services.
- At Cologne Central Station, transfers are possible with Deutsche Bahn.

==== Through-tickets ====
Eurostar offers a through-ticket to specific destinations by train, that is a single contract for multi leg journeys with certain passenger rights and protections. Through-tickets are available from 68 British towns and cities to destinations in France and Belgium. Standard Eurostar tickets no longer include free onward connections to or from any other station in Belgium: this is available for a flat-rate supplement, as of 2011 for £5.5 (€6.3).

In May 2009 Eurostar announced that a formal connection to Switzerland had been established in a partnership between Eurostar and Lyria, which will operate TGV services from Lille to the Swiss Alps for Eurostar connection.

In May 2019, Eurostar ended its agreement with Deutsche Bahn that allowed passengers to travel on a through-ticket by train from the UK via Brussels to Germany and further to Austria and Switzerland. Under the agreement, passengers could travel on a single through-ticket with passenger rights in case of disruption of one train. However, the through-tickets ceased to be sold from 9 November 2019.

==== Railteam, air-rail alliances ====
Eurostar is a member of Railteam, an alliance formed in July 2007 of seven European high-speed rail operators. The alliance allows passengers to benefit from "HOTNAT" (hop on the next available train) in case of a missed connection, even when travelling with separate tickets. Frequent travellers also benefit from mutual recognition of frequent traveller programmes – Eurostar Carte Blanche and Étoile members have access, for example, to a network of 30+ lounges.

In September 2024, Eurostar signed a memorandum of understanding to join SkyTeam as its first non-airline partner. This cooperation will enable integrated intermodal transport (air-rail) in the UK, France and the Netherlands. Eurostar also has a codeshare agreement with KLM, and interline agreements with:

- EVA Air
- Hahn Air
- KLM
- United Airlines

In 2024, an estimated 13% of Eurostar passengers flying long-haul into a principal European SkyTeam hub, already connect to another Eurostar destination by rail.

=== Controls and security ===
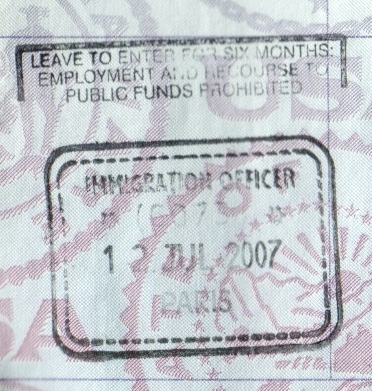

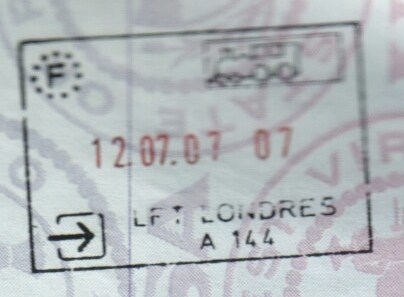
Entering the UK in Paris (left) and France in London using the Eurostar

Because the UK is no longer a member of the European Union and was never part of the Schengen Area, and because the Netherlands, Belgium and France are not part of the Common Travel Area, all cross-channel Eurostar passengers must go through border controls before the channel crossing, and often in their embarkation station using juxtaposed controls.

International departures waiting area, after the border and security checks, at St Pancras railway station

In addition, to comply with UK law around the tunnel's security, there are full security checks similar to those at airports, consisting of bag X-rays and walk-through metal detectors. The recommended check-in time is 90–120 minutes except for business class where it is 45–60 minutes; these are much longer than previously because of extra checks in place due to Brexit. In February 2026, Eurostar and St. Pancras officials proposed a plan to cut boarding times by 30 minutes to make them more similar to other train journeys.

Eurostar passengers travelling within the Schengen area on trains towards London bypass border checks, and enter the pre-allocated cars at the rear of the train, which are reserved for these passengers. This area is then searched at Lille and all passengers removed. This arrangement was set up after numerous people entered the UK without prior authorisation, by buying a ticket from Brussels to Lille or Calais but remaining on the train until London.

When the Amsterdam to London route began, it was direct in only one direction: passengers had to disembark in Brussels to go through the juxtaposed controls. The direct connection was subject to talks between the UK and Dutch governments, and juxtaposed controls buildings were constructed on platforms at Amsterdam Centraal and Rotterdam Centraal, opening on 26 October 2020. These were closed for renovations on 15 June 2024, and re-opened on 10 February 2025.

A Eurostar in the international area of St Pancras railway station

Travel from Calais or Lille towards Brussels and the Netherlands has no border or security control. On 7 July 2020, a modified agreement was signed in Brussels that includes The Netherlands in the previous agreement. This allows for juxtaposed controls in Amsterdam and Rotterdam like those in Brussels and Paris. When the tripartite agreements were signed, the Belgian Government said that it had serious questions about the compatibility of this agreement with the Schengen Convention and the principle of free movement of people enshrined in various European treaties. On 30 June 2009, Eurostar raised concerns at the UK House of Commons Home Affairs Select Committee that it was illegal under French law to collect the information required by the UK government under the e-Borders scheme, and the company would be unable to cooperate.

On the northbound Marseille-London train, there was no facility for security or passport checks at the southern French stations, so passengers left the train at Lille-Europe, taking all their belongings with them, and underwent security and border checks there before rejoining the train which waited at the station for just over an hour.

On several occasions, people have tried to stow away illegally on board the train, sometimes in large groups, trying to enter the UK; border monitoring and security is therefore extremely tight. Eurostar claims to have good and well-funded security measures.

=== Former stations and routes ===
Eurostar previously served London Waterloo International (1994–2007). There had been plans to retain some Eurostar services at Waterloo International, but this was ruled out on cost grounds.

Eurostar also previously served:

- Ashford International (1996–2020), Calais-Fréthun (1994–2020), and Ebbsfleet International (2007–2020). Services to these stations was interrupted during the COVID-19 pandemic, and were never resumed
- Lyon-Part-Dieu (2013, 2015-2020), Avignon TGV (2013, 2015-2020) and Aix-en-Provence (2013)/Marseille-Saint-Charles (2015-2020). In 2013 Eurostar trialled a south France route in addition to its long standing London-Avignon route. The new route linked London with Aix-en-Provence with intermediate stops at Lyon and Avignon (TGV station). The route did not return in 2014 but a new direct year round service linking London with Marseille was launched in 2015.
- Avignon-Centre (2002-2014) Eurostar offered weekly seasonal journeys to Avignon Centre. The seasonal route was discontinued in favour of the new year round service to Marseille which called at nearby Avignon TGV station.
- Disneyland Paris Marne-la-Vallée (1996-2023). Services to this station was cancelled as Eurostar focused on its most profitable routes.

Eurostar also used to offer direct "Snow trains" from London aimed at skiers, to Bourg-Saint-Maurice, Aime-la-Plagne and Moûtiers in the Alps; these ran weekly, arriving in the alps in the evening and leaving the same evening to arrive in London the following morning. This service was suspended at the time of the COVID-19 pandemic. It resumed for the 2023/24 ski season, but with no direct/through train. Instead, passengers travelling to/from London change to a domestic Eurostar train at Lille-Europe. Direct Eurostar Snow services still exist from Belgium and the Netherlands.

=== Proposed services ===
==== Extensions to cross-Channel services ====
Over the years, a number of potential cross-Channel services have been proposed. In 2012, an interview in the Financial Times revealed that Cologne, Lyon, and Marseille had been considered, alongside a secondary hub in Brussels. In March 2016, in an interview with Bloomberg, Eurostar's Chief Executive had also expressed interest in operating a direct train service between London and Bordeaux. Journey time was said to be around 4.5 hours using the new LGV Sud Europe Atlantique.

The 2025 purchase of 50 new trains should allow for the creation of new routes by the early 2030s, including potential services from London to Frankfurt, from London to Geneva, and from Amsterdam/Brussels to Geneva.

===== Challenges to further cross-Channel services =====
"We know we can go to most places in France physically, because our trains are compatible with French infrastructure, but then you've got to look at impact on fleet utilisation, you've got to have a station that's got the spare capacity to have a train stood for a number of hours, for all the security, screening, passport control passes. So it's not possible to go just anywhere. And you've got to be able to get the control authorities to agree that there's a big enough market for it to be worthwhile for them to set up there."

— Richard Brown, former Chief Executive of Eurostar (2008).

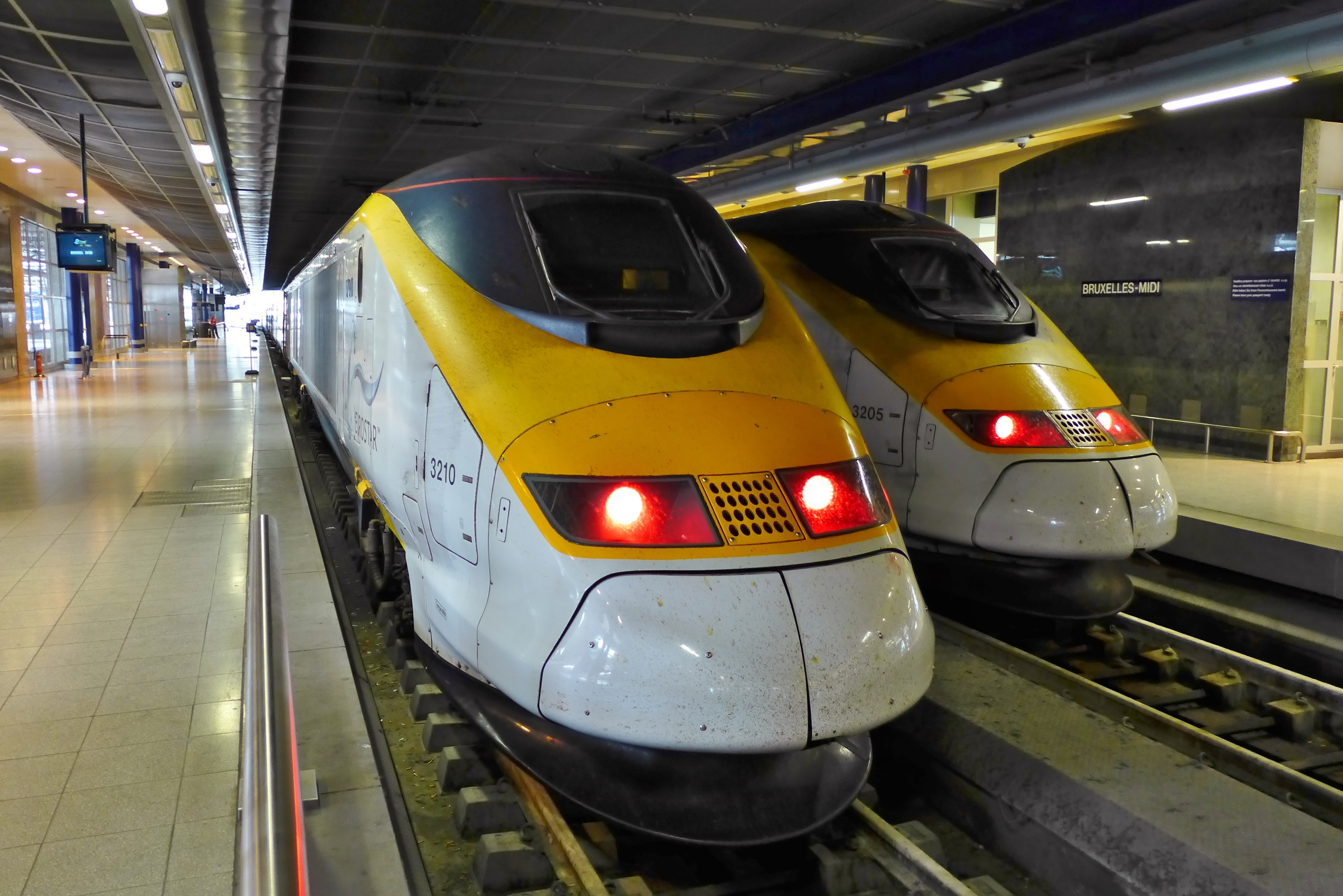
Eurostar e300 trains, in their former livery at Brussels-South

The e320 trains allow Eurostar the possibility of London to Germany services in the future, but implementing such new services is complex. The UK is neither part of the Schengen Agreement, which allows unrestricted movement across borders of member countries, nor a member of the EU. This means that travellers between the UK and EU must pass through full border identification, visa and customs controls for their departure and arrival countries, while travellers between stations within the Schengen area do not. The logistics of providing space and time for these controls while conforming to the requirements of free travel within the Schengen area makes implementing new services operationally complex.

The difficulties that Eurostar faces in expanding its services between the UK and the EU would also be faced by any potential competitors to Eurostar. Trains must use platforms that are physically isolated, a constraint which other intra-EU operators do not face. In addition, the British authorities are required to make security and passport checks on passengers before they board the train, which might deter domestic passengers. Compounding the difficulties in providing a similar service are the Channel Tunnel safety rules, the major ones being the "half-train rule" and the "length rule". The "half-train rule" stipulated that passenger trains had to be able to split in an emergency. Class 373 trains were designed as two half-sets, which when coupled form a complete train, enabling them to be split easily in the event of an emergency while in the tunnel, with the unaffected set able to be driven out. The half-train rule was finally abolished in May 2010. However, the "length rule", which states that passenger trains must be at least 375 m (1,230 ft) long with a through corridor (to match the distance between the safety doors in the tunnel), was retained, preventing any potential operators from applying to run services with existing fleets, as the majority of both TGV and ICE trains are only 200 m (660 ft) long.

==== Stratford International ====
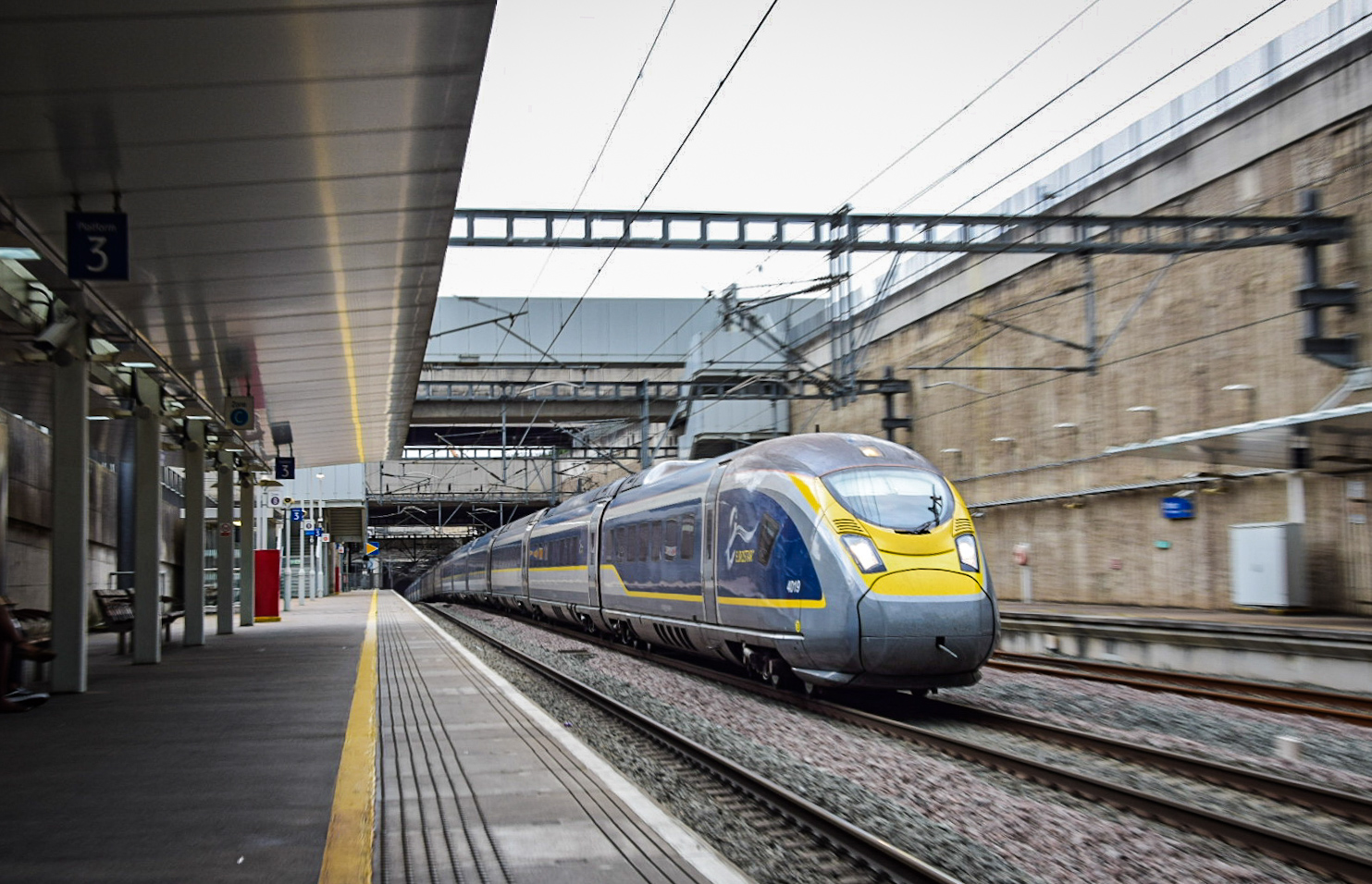
Eurostar service passing Stratford International

Eurostar trains also do not currently call at Stratford International, which was intended to be a London stop for the regional Eurostars when the station was constructed. This was to be reviewed following the 2012 Olympics. However, in 2013, Eurostar claimed that its 'business would be hit' by stopping trains there.

==== Regional Eurostar and Nightstar ====
The original proposals for Eurostar included direct services to Paris and Brussels from cities north of London: Manchester Piccadilly via Birmingham New Street on the West Coast Main Line and Leeds and Glasgow Central via Edinburgh Waverley, Newcastle and York on the East Coast Main Line.

Seven 14-coach "North of London" Eurostar trains for these Regional Eurostar services were built, but these services never came to fruition. Predicted journey times of almost nine hours for Glasgow to Paris at the time of growth of low-cost air travel during the 1990s made the plans commercially unviable against the cheaper and quicker airlines. Other reasons that have been suggested for these services having never been run were both government policies and the disruptive privatisation of British Rail. Three of the Regional Eurostar units were leased by Great North Eastern Railway (GNER) to increase domestic services from London King's Cross to York and later Leeds. The lease expired in December 2005, and most of the North of London sets were transferred to SNCF for TGV services in northern France.

An international Nightstar sleeper train was also planned; this would have travelled the same routes as Regional Eurostar, plus the Great Western Main Line to Cardiff Central. These were also deemed commercially unviable, and the scheme was abandoned with no services ever operated. In 2000, the coaches were sold to Via Rail in Canada.

Although the original plan for Regional Eurostar services to destinations north of London was abandoned, the significantly improved journey times available since the opening of High Speed 1 — which is physically connected to both the East Coast Main Line and the North London Line (for the West Coast Main Line) at London St Pancras International – and the increased maximum speeds on the West Coast Main Line since the 2000s may make potential Regional Eurostar services more commercially viable. This would be even more likely if proposals are adopted for a new high-speed line from London to the north of Britain. Simon Montague, Eurostar's Director of Communications, commented that: "...International services to the regions are only likely once High Speed 2 is built." However, as of 2014 the current plans for High Speed 2 do not allow for a direct rail link between that new line and High Speed 1, meaning passengers would still be required to change at London Euston and take some form of transportation to London St Pancras.

Key pieces of infrastructure still belong to LCR via its subsidiary London & Continental Stations and Property, such as the Manchester International Depot, and Eurostar (UK) still owns several track access rights and the rights to paths on both the East Coast Main Line and the West Coast Main Line.

==== LGV Picardie ====
LGV Picardie is a proposed high-speed line between Paris and Calais via Amiens. By cutting off the corner of the LGV Nord at Lille, it would enable Eurostar trains to save 20 minutes on the journey between Paris and Calais, bringing the London–Paris journey time under 2 hours. In 2008, the French Government announced its future investment plans for new LGVs to be built up to 2020; LGV Picardie was not included but was listed as planned in the longer term.

== Corporate structure ==
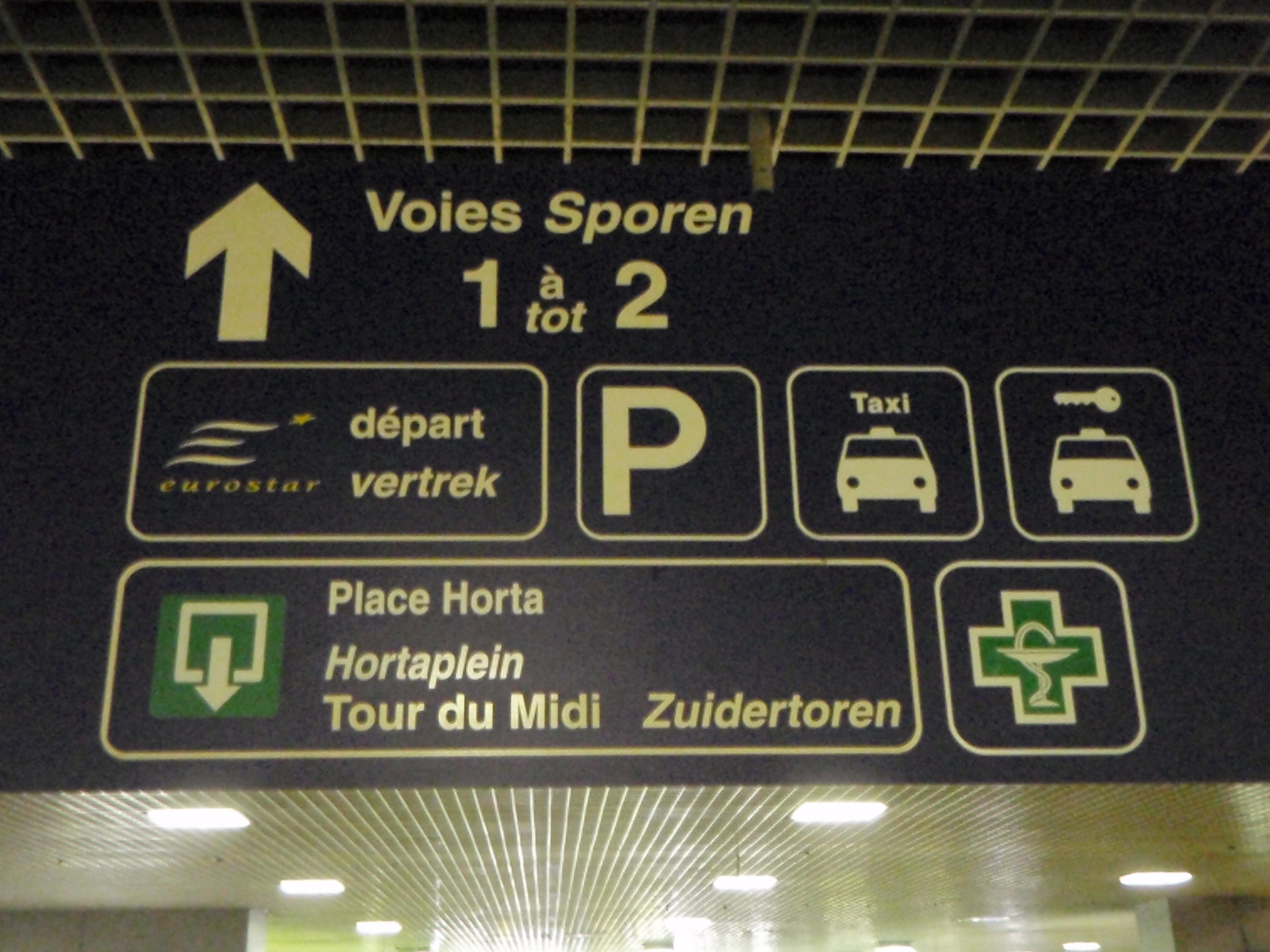
Eurostar departure information – Brussels

From its origins in 1994, Eurostar was originally operated as a collaboration of three separate French, British and Belgian corporate entities.

In June 2009 London and Continental Railways, and the Eurostar UK operations they held ownership of, became fully nationalised by the UK government. On 1 September 2010, Eurostar was incorporated as a single corporate entity, Eurostar International Limited (EIL), replacing the joint operation between EUKL, SNCF and SNCB/NMBS. Once all Eurostar assets were transferred to EIL, the holdings in the company were amended to SNCF (55%), LCR (40%), and NMBS/SNCB (5%).

In 2014, the British Government transferred LCR's 40% stake in EIL to HM Treasury to enable its sale. The following year, the shareholding was sold for £760 million (€943 million), leading to the following ownership structure: SNCF (55%), Caisse de dépôt et placement du Québec (CDPQ) (30%), Hermes Infrastructure (10%) and SNCB (5%).

Following the approval of Eurostar's merger with Thalys, EIL became part of a new holding company, Eurostar Group, in April 2022. Ownership of Eurostar Group was split between the previous shareholders of EIL and THIF, with SNCF retaining its majority stake (55.75%), and other shareholders having the following: CDPQ (19.31%), SNCB (18.50%), and Hermes (6.44%).

=== Logos ===
Following the merger, the new six-pointed star logo was designed, inspired by the Étoile du Nord.

Eurostar logo timeline

1994 to 2011

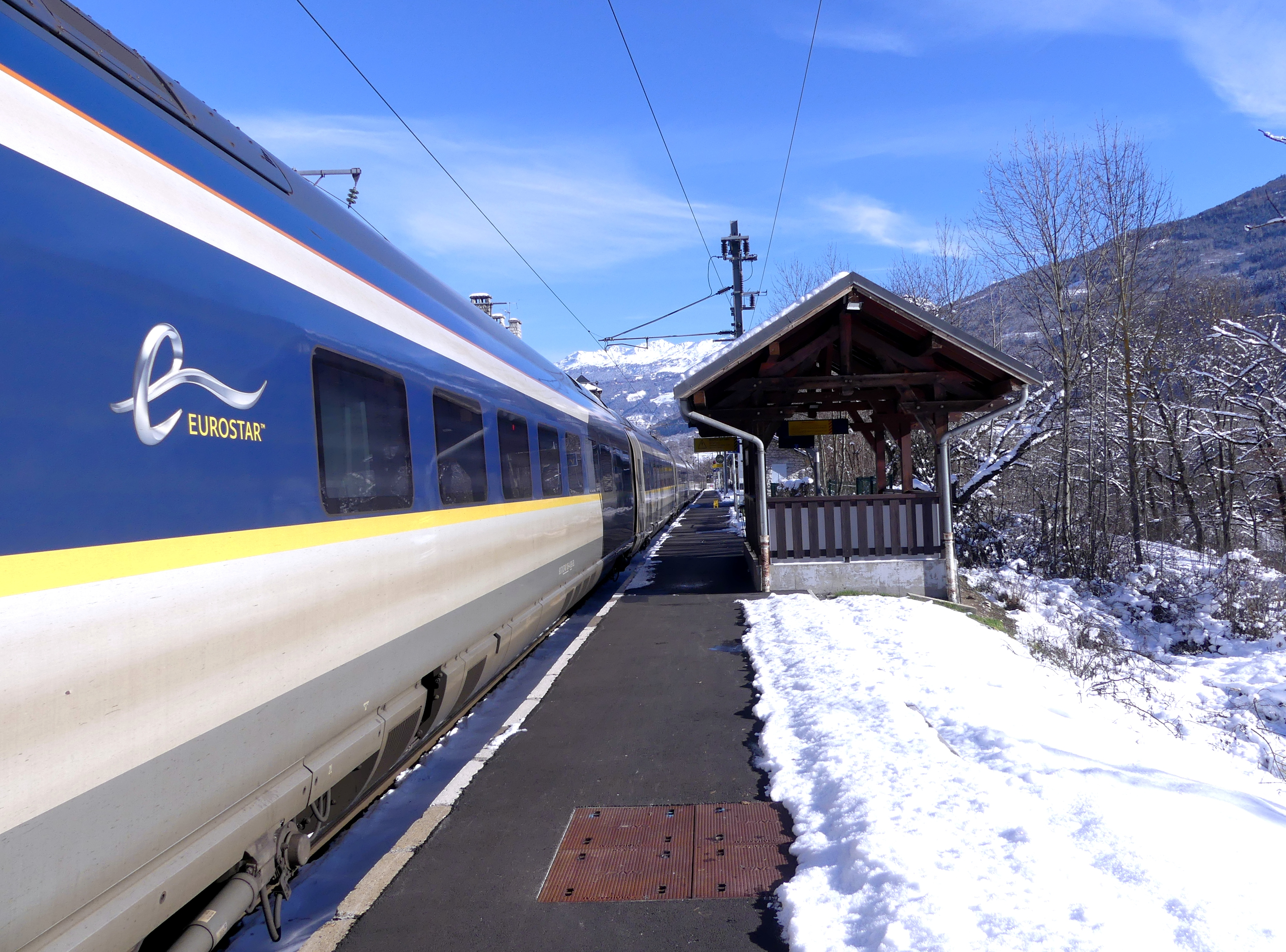
2011 to 2023

Since 2023

== Performance and market position ==
In 2024, T&E ranked Eurostar last among 27 European train companies based on a number of service-related indicators. Eurostar landed 26th in terms of prices, tied last for cycling friendliness, and scored below average in terms of reliability, its traveller experience, and its compensation policies. On pricing in particular, the report called on the EU to make international rail travel cheaper by dropping international tolls, and VAT on international trips.

=== Travel classes ===
Over the years, Eurostar has changed its travel classes a number of times. As of January 2026, there are three classes: Standard, Plus and Premier. In Plus, passengers benefit from "extra comfy seating," additional work space, and a meal service. Premier passengers benefit from additional ticket flexibility, dedicated priority boarding lanes, premium food, and lounge access.

=== Fares ===
Eurostar's fares were significantly higher in its early years; the cheapest fare in 1994 was £99 (€128) return. In 2002, Eurostar was planning cheaper fares, an example of which was an offer of £50-day returns from London to Paris or Brussels. By March 2003, the cheapest fare from the UK was £59 return, available all year around. In June 2009 it was announced that one-way single fares would be available at £31 at the cheapest. Competition between Eurostar and airline services was a large factor in ticket prices being reduced from the initial levels. As of January 2026, adult single tickets start from £39, though Eurostar Snap (a last-minute, non-refundable service) may offer cheaper tickets. Interrail and Eurail passes can be used on Eurostar services for a special fare.

Business fares also slightly undercut air fares on similar routes. Eurostar explicitly targets regular business travellers, including with the possibility of chartering a private carriage.

The Eurostar ticketing system is very complex, being distributed through no fewer than 48 individual sales systems. Eurostar is a member of the Amadeus CRS distribution system, making its tickets available alongside those of airlines worldwide.

=== Reliability and speed ===
Eurostar's punctuality has fluctuated from year to year. Historically, fewer than 10% of trains on cross-Channel services were late by more than 15 minutes, though the average over 2022-2025 has been around 15%. Eurostar's best punctuality record was 97.35%, between 16 and 22 August 2004. Punctuality has helped Eurostar beat rival transit modes: in the first quarter of 2009 for example, 96% of Eurostar services were punctual, compared with rival air routes' 76%. Continental services have been slightly less punctual. Between 2022 and 2025, they were late by at least 15 minutes 19% of the time.

Detailed reliability data on cross-Channel services (1999, 2006–2026)
Period	Delays of at least 5 minutes	Delays of at least 15 minutes	Delays of at least 30 minutes	Reference
April 2025-March 2026	26.9%	16.7%		
April 2024-March 2025	30.3%	15.1%		
April 2023-March 2024	27.2%	13.5%		
April 2022-March 2023	30.4%	17.7%		
May 2021-April 2022	14.7%	7.6%		
June 2020-April 2021	17.1%	8.7%		
June 2019-May 2020	29.4%	10.5%		
June 2018-May 2019	27.5%	16.5%		
May 2017-April 2018	34.3%	18.7%		
May 2016-April 2017	21.6%	10.1%		
2015	23.5%	22.1%		
2014	16.2%	7.6%		
2013	20.1%	9.6%		
2012	17.6%	7.9%		
2011	18.5%	7.5%		
2008		7.5%		
2007		8.5%		
August-October 2006*		7.3%		
March-May 2016*	25.82%		3.04%	
January-June 1999*		8% (Q1); 11% (Q2)		
Note: *Non-annual reporting

Detailed reliability data on other services (2016, 2022–2025)
Période	Delays of at least 5 minutes	Delays of at least 15 minutes	Delays of at least 30 minutes	Delays between 60-119 minutes	Delays of over 2 hours	Référence
April 2025-March 2026		21.9%				
April 2024-March 2025		23.1%				
April 2023-March 2024		19.4%		2.2%	0.5%	
2022		25.4%				
2021		20.6%				
2020		26.3%				
2019		25.7%				
2018		27.5%				
2017		21.7%				
2016		19.6%				
2015		17.9%				
2014		17.4%				
March-May 2016*	13.17%		3.77%			
Note: *Non-annual reporting

Eurostar market share and punctuality

An advantage held by Eurostar is the convenience and speed of the service: with shorter check-in times than at most airports and hence quicker boarding and less queueing and high punctuality, it takes less time to travel between central London and central Paris by high-speed rail than by air.

=== Passenger numbers ===
Eurostar has a dominant share of the combined rail–air market on a number of its routes, notably its legacy links. On London-Paris, it now has 80-90% of the market, up from 66% in 2004 and 71% in 2007. On London-Brussels, it now has 80% of the market up from 59% in 2004, and 65% in 2007. On the historic Thalys routes, it has a dominant position on Paris-Amsterdam (80%), and had a dominant position on point-to-point journeys between Paris and Brussels/West Germany (80%) as of 2014. This dominant position may shift as competitors enter the market.

Eurostar's passenger numbers initially failed to meet predictions. In 1996, London and Continental Railways forecast that passenger numbers would reach 21.4 million annually by 2004, but only 7.3 million was achieved. Eighty-two million passengers used Waterloo International Station from its opening in 1994 to its closure in 2007. 2008 was a record year for Eurostar, with a 10.3% rise in passenger use, which was attributed to the use of High Speed 1 and the move to London St Pancras International. The following year, Eurostar saw an 11.5% fall in passenger numbers during the first three months of 2009, attributed to the 2008 Channel Tunnel fire and the Great Recession.

As a result of the poor economic conditions, Eurostar received state aid in May 2009 to cancel out some of the accumulated debt from the High Speed 1 construction programme. Later that year, during snowy conditions in the run-up to Christmas, thousands of passengers were left stranded as several trains broke down and many more were cancelled. In an independent review commissioned by Eurostar, the company came in for serious criticism about its handling of the incident and lack of plans for such a scenario.

In 2006, the Department for Transport predicted that, by 2037, annual cross-channel passenger numbers would probably reach 16 million, considerably less optimistic than London and Continental Railways's original 1996 forecast. In 2007 Eurostar set a target of carrying 10 million passengers by 2010. The company cited several factors to support this objective, such as improved journey times, punctuality and station facilities. Passengers in general, it stated, are becoming increasingly aware of the environmental effects of air travel, and Eurostar services emit much less carbon dioxide. and that its remaining carbon emissions are now offset, making its services carbon neutral.

By 2026, cumulative ridership since 1994 surpassed 400 million. Eurostar transported 20 million passengers in 2025, the highest ever, surpassing the pre-pandemic high in 2019. The following chart presents the estimated number of passengers annually transported by the Eurostar service since 1995:

=== Potential competition ===
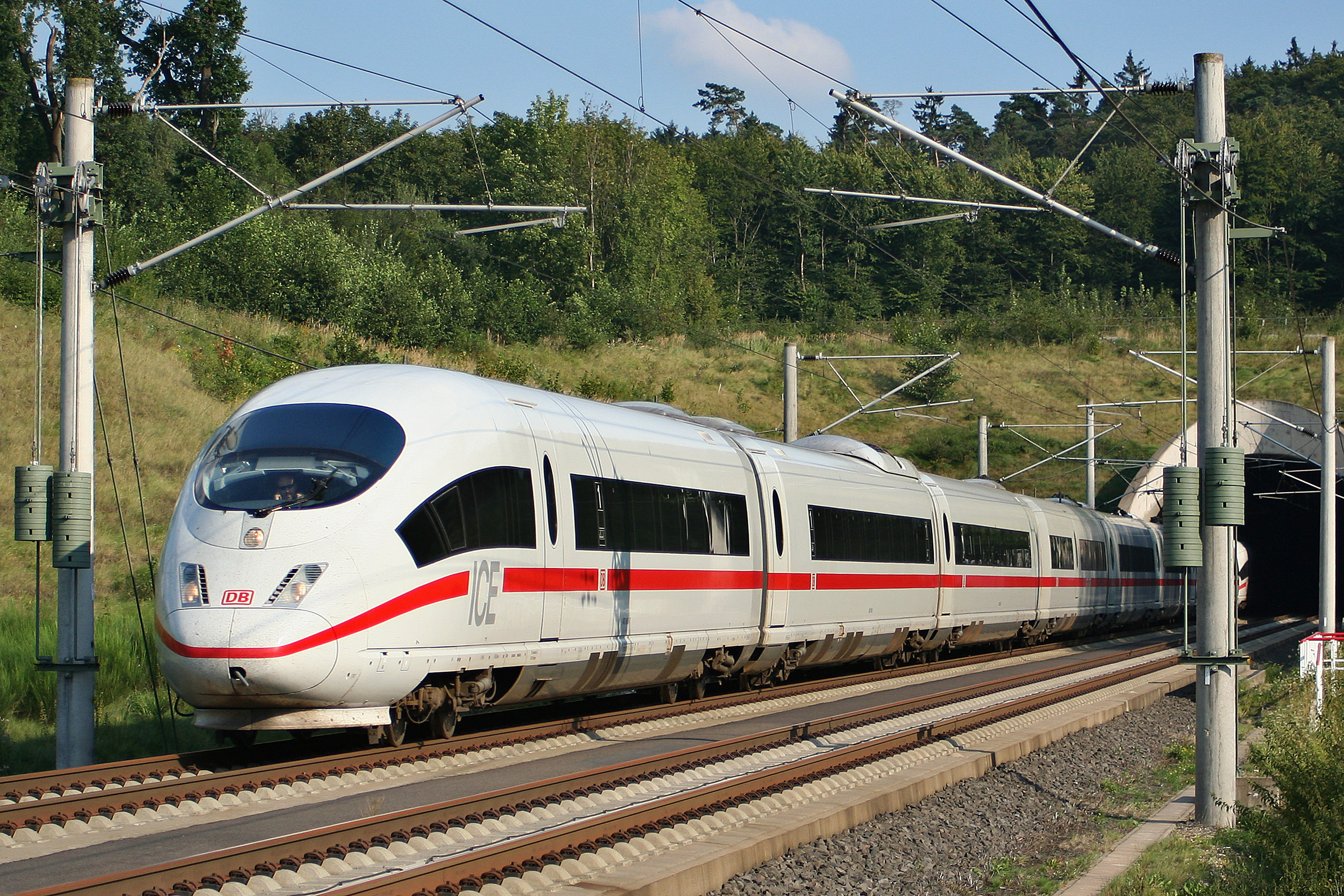
DB ICE 3 service

Following the liberalisation of international rail travel by European Union directives in 2010, various operators have announced proposals for competition with Eurostar.

Deutsche Bahn (DB) intended to run services between London to Frankfurt and Amsterdam (two of the biggest air travel markets in Europe), with trains 'splitting & joining' in Brussels. In July 2010, DB announced that it intended to make a test run with a high-speed ICE-3MF train through the Channel Tunnel in October 2010 in preparation for possible future operations. The trial ran on 19 October 2010 with a Class 406 ICE train specially liveried with a British "Union flag" decal, later put on display for the press at London St Pancras International (though the proposed service would in fact have used Class 407 ICE units, adapted for the Channel Tunnel). DB scrapped the plan, mainly due to advance passport check requirements. DB had hoped that immigration checks could be done on board, but British authorities required immigration and security checks to be done at Lille-Europe station, taking at least 30 minutes.

In 2021, Renfe, the national operator of Spain announced it was proposing competing London to Paris services.

In 2022, Getlink, the owner of the Channel Tunnel had reportedly considered purchasing trains suitable for competing services, leasing them to rival operations, while in 2023, Mobico Group, the owner of National Express has also been reported to be considering cross-Channel services named 'Evolyn'.

From August 2024 to March 2025, the Office of Rail and Road (ORR) solicited final proposals on whether competition should be added through the Channel Tunnel, with Virgin Trains Europe, Evolyn, Gemini, and FS Group submitting plans.

In April 2025, FS Group announced an MOU with Mobico Group to run Paris to London trains by 2029.

On 30 October 2025, ORR announced that there was enough maintenance space at Temple Mills Depot to allow a second competitor to run through the Channel Tunnel, and it had approved Virgin Trains Europe to begin operations within the next five years. Virgin Trains Europe has purchased 12 Avelia Stream trains from Alstom for the route, and plans to begin services by 2030.

== Environmental initiatives ==
=== Tread Lightly ===
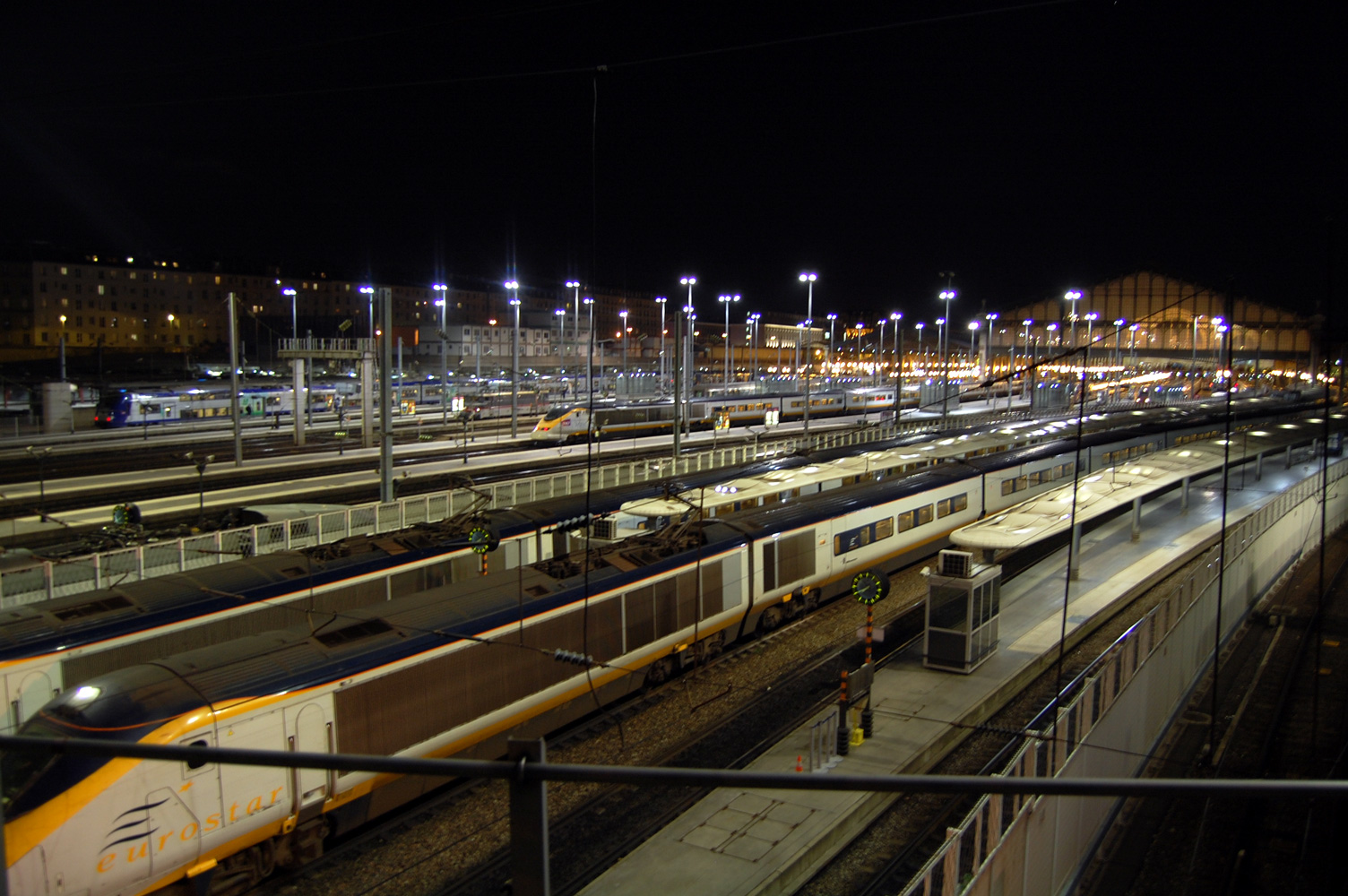
Eurostars at Paris Nord running late night services

In 2006, Eurostar's Environment Group was set up, with the aim of making changes in the Eurostar services' daily running to decrease negative environmental impact. In 2007, Eurostar said they would become the world's first carbon-neutral train service through its launch of "Tread Lightly," an environmental programme with the goal of reducing the service's carbon-dioxide emissions by 25% by 2012. In the grand opening ceremony of London St Pancras International, one of the Eurostar trains was given the name 'Tread Lightly', said to symbolise their smaller impact on the environment compared to planes.

The programme included: reducing power consumption on its rolling stock; sourcing more electricity from lower-emission generators; adding new controls on lighting, heating, and air conditioning; reducing paper usage via electronic tickets; recycling water and employee uniforms; sourcing all food on board from Britain, France, or Belgium. Drivers were trained in techniques to achieve maximum energy efficiency, and lighting was minimised; the provider of the bulk of the energy for the Channel Tunnel was switched to nuclear power stations in France. Eurostar also funded three renewable energy projects in developing regions around the world: a windfarm in Tamil Nadu, India; a micro-hydropower project in China; and a plan specifying improvements on fuel consumption of three-wheeler taxis in Indonesia. By 2008, Eurostar's environmental credentials had become a key branding component.

=== Single-use plastics reduction ===
In 2019, Eurostar removed all single-use plastics from its trains between London and Paris. Now the trains serve only wooden cutlery, recyclable cans of water, glass wine bottles, paper-based coffee cups, and eco-friendly food packaging. Eurostar partnered with the Woodland Trust, ReforestAction, and Trees for All in 2020, with the goal of planting 20,000 trees each year in woodlands along its routes across the UK, Belgium, and the Netherlands.

=== Bicycles ===
Its friendliness to bicycles remains a missing part of its environmental strategy. In 2023, its cycle booking was described as "farcical," and in 2024 it scored a 0 for cycling accessibility in T&E's report, alongside Ouigo, Italo, Renfe and SJ. As of January 2026, the only cross-Channel services allowing assembled bikes were London-Brussels services – such bikes had to be dropped off with luggage services, and incurred a fee. The forthcoming Avelia Horizon trains should have bicycle racks included.

=== Effect ===
By 2015, Eurostar had reduced its carbon emissions by 32% since Tread Lightly launched. By 2019, it had reduced its carbon footprint by over 40%. Eurostar trains now emit up to 90% less greenhouse gas emissions than the equivalent flight.

In 2024, it announced new goals to run all trains by renewable energy by 2030.

== Records and awards ==
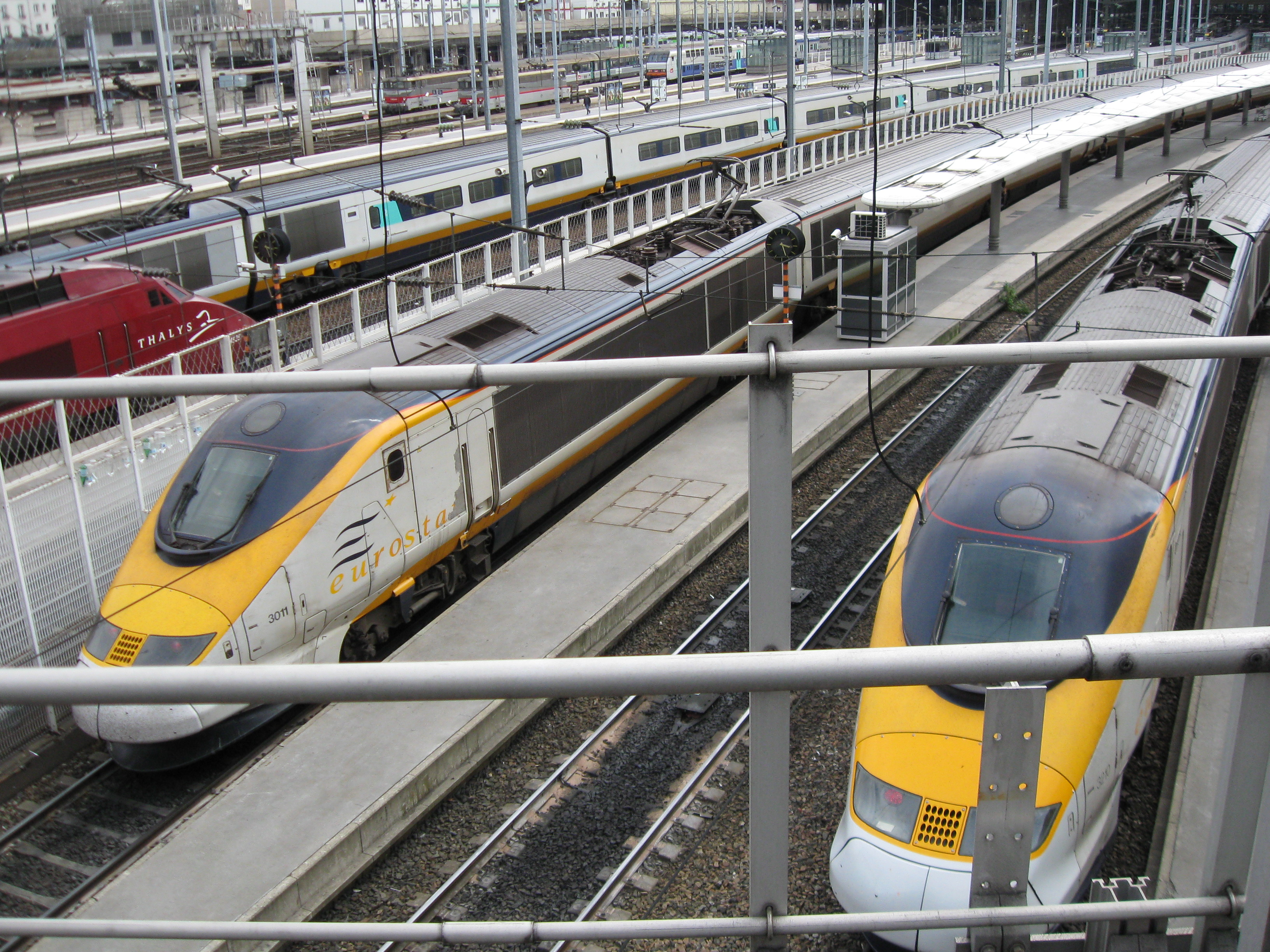
Several Eurostar trains at platforms at Paris Nord

=== Records ===
The Channel Tunnel used by Eurostar services holds the record for having the longest underwater section of any tunnel in the world, and is the third-longest railway tunnel (behind the Seikan Tunnel and the Gotthard Base Tunnel) in the world.

On 30 July 2003, a Eurostar train set a new British speed record of 334.7 km/h (210 mph) on the first section of the "High Speed 1" railway between the Channel Tunnel, and Fawkham Junction in north Kent, two months before official public services began running.

On 16 May 2006, Eurostar set a new record for the longest non-stop high-speed journey, a distance of 1,421 km (883 mi) from London to Cannes taking 7 hours 25 minutes.

On 4 September 2007, a record-breaking train left Paris Nord at 10:44 (09:44 BST) and reached London St Pancras International in 2 hours 3 minutes 39 seconds, carrying journalists and railway workers. This record trip was also the first passenger-carrying arrival at the new London St Pancras International station. On 20 September 2007, Eurostar broke another record when it completed the journey from Brussels to London in 1 hour 43 minutes.

=== Awards ===
Eurostar has been hailed as having set new, high standards for international rail travel, especially starting in its second decade, accumulating accolades across environmental, travel and industry categories.

Following its 2006 environmental strategy, it won a number of environmental awards, with Network Rail awarding Eurostar its Efficiency Award, the Sunday Times placing it on its Best Green Companies List (2009), Institute of Travel Management presenting it with an ICARUS Environmental Award for Best Rail Provider (2009), and the World Travel Market awarding it a Responsible Tourism Award for Best Low Carbon Initiative (2011). PETA named it its Best Travel Experience in 2019, and Ecovadis awarded it a Gold Medal for its sustainability across its supply chain, while since 2019 Eurostar has held a three-star rating from the Sustainable Restaurant Association. The World Travel Awards has recognised Eurostar repeatedly in its sustainability category with nominations for World's Leading Green Transport Solution Company in every year from 2008 to 2025, and with wins in 2020 and 2022. It was nominated in the successor category of World's Leading Sustainable Mobility Solution Company in 2024 and 2025. In 2022, a joint partnership between Avanti West Coast and Eurostar for their COP26 Climate Train won a Golden Whistle Award from Modern Railways magazine and the Chartered Institution of Railway Operators.

In the travel press, Eurostar has twice won the Guardian & Observer Travel Award for Best Train Company (2008 and 2009), and in 2012 won TNT Magazine's Gold Backpack Award for Favourite Travel Transport (2012). Eurostar also took home Travel Weekly's Golden Globes Award for Best Rail Operator (2010) and for Sustainable Future (2026). Business Travel Awards Europe named Eurostar Travel Partner of the Year in the Rail Operator category in 2010, 2012, 2024, and 2025.

Within the rail industry itself, Eurostar won the 2005 Train Operator of the Year award in the Rail Awards, and European Cross Border Operator of the Year at the 2014 European Rail Congress Awards. The World Travel Awards has named Eurostar the World's Leading Passenger Rail Operator (1998-2009, 2011-2012) and Europe's Leading Passenger Rail Operator (2015-2016). The National Rail Awards named it Train of the Year in 2017, and the Mobile Industry Awards honoured it as Distributor of the Year in 2020.

== Fleet ==
=== Fleet details ===
Class	Image	Top speed		Carriages	Seating capacity	Number in use	Unit numbers	Electric systems	Routes operated	Built
Class	Image	km/h	mph	Carriages	Seating capacity	Number in use	Unit numbers	Electric systems	Routes operated	Built
Cross-channel routes (pre-merger Eurostar)
Eurostar e300		300	186	2 power cars + 18 coaches	750	8	373001–373022; 373101–373108; 373201–373202; 373205–373224; 373229–373232	25 kV 50 Hz AC; 1,500 V DC; 3,000 V DC	London – Paris; London – Brussels	1992–1996
Eurostar e320		320	200	8 self-propelled coaches & 8 non-powered coaches	894	17	374001–374034	25 kV 50 Hz AC; 15 kV 16.7 Hz AC; 1,500 V DC; 3,000 V DC	London – Paris; London – Brussels – Amsterdam; Paris – Brussels – Amsterdam; Paris – Brussels	2011–2018
Continental routes (pre-merger Thalys)
PBA		320	200	2 power cars + 8 coaches	371	9	4532–4540	25 kV 50 Hz AC; 1,500 V DC; 3,000 V DC	Paris – Brussels – Amsterdam	1996
PBKA		320	200	2 power cars + 8 coaches	371-399	17	4301–4307; 4331–4332; 4341–4346	25 kV 50 Hz AC; 15 kV 16.7 Hz AC; 1,500 V DC; 3,000 V DC	Paris – Brussels – Amsterdam; Paris – Brussels – Cologne – Dortmund	1997

=== Current fleet ===
==== Eurostar e300 ====
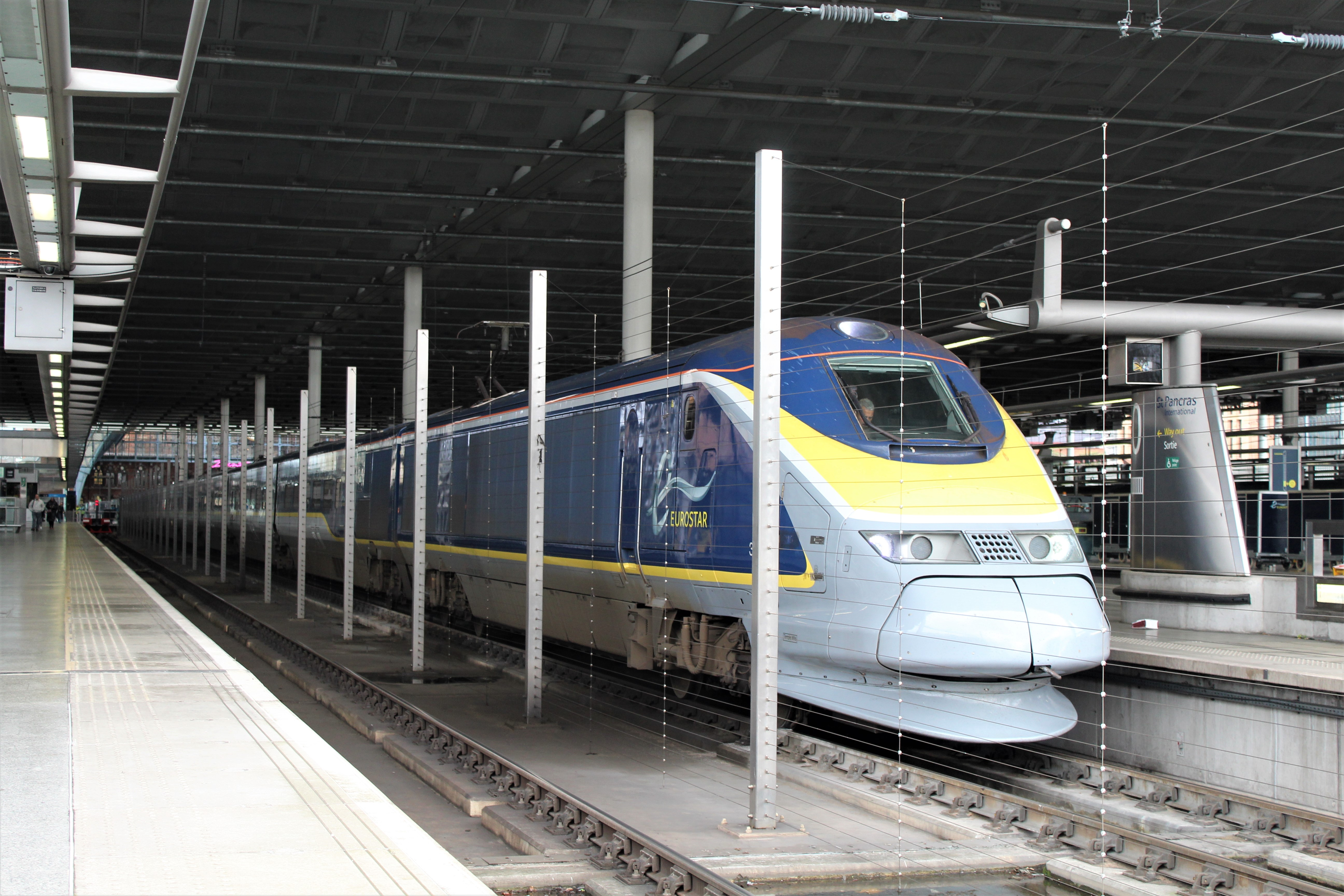
Eurostar e300 at London St Pancras International, London

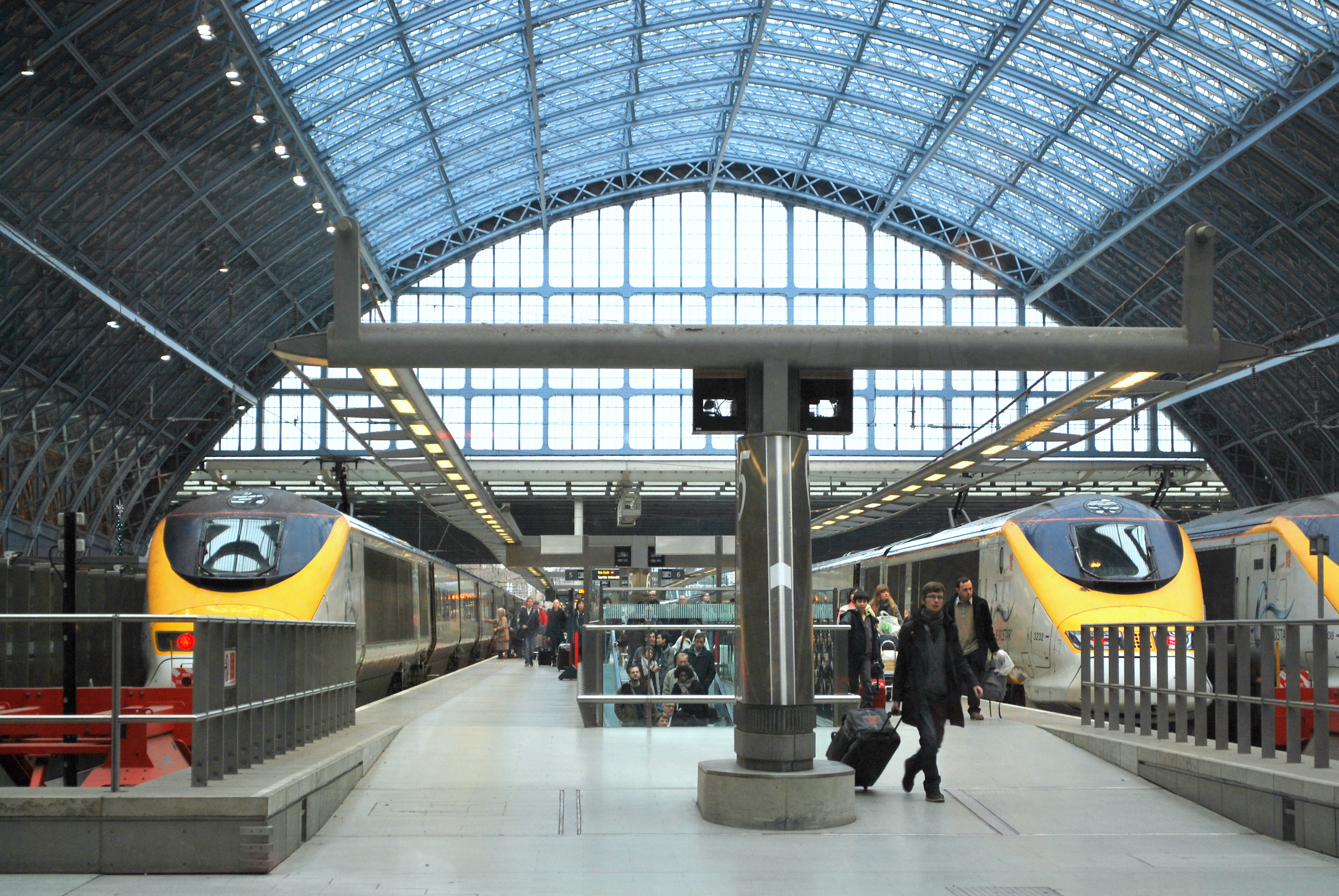
Three Eurostar trains waiting at London St Pancras International station

Built between 1992 and 1996, Eurostar's fleet consisted of 38 EMU trains, designated Class 373 in the United Kingdom and TGV TMST in France. The units have also been branded as the Eurostar e300 by Eurostar since 2015. There are two variants:

- 31 "Inter-Capital" sets consisting of two power cars and eighteen passenger carriages. These trains are 394 m (1,293 ft) long and can carry 750 passengers: 206 in first class, 544 in standard class.
- Seven shorter "North of London" sets which have two power cars and fourteen passenger carriages and are 320 m (1,050 ft) long. These sets have a capacity of 558 seats: 114 first class, 444 standard and which were designed to operate the aborted Regional Eurostar services.

Each train has a unique four-digit number starting with "3" (3xxx). This designates the train as a Mark 3 TGV (Mark 1 being SNCF TGV Sud-Est; Mark 2 being SNCF TGV Atlantique). The second digit denotes the country of ownership:

- 30xx UK
- 31xx Belgium
- 32xx France
- 33xx Regional Eurostar

The trains are essentially modified TGV sets, and can operate at up to 300 km/h (185 mph) on high-speed lines, and 160 km/h (100 mph) in the Channel Tunnel. It is possible to exceed the 300 km/h speed limit, but only with special permission from the safety authorities in the respective country. Speed limits in the Channel Tunnel are dictated by air-resistance, energy (heat) dissipation and the need to be used with other, slower trains. The trains were designed with Channel Tunnel safety in mind, and consist of two independent "half-sets" each with its own power car. In the event of a serious fire on board while travelling through the tunnel, passengers would be transferred into the undamaged half of the train, which would then be detached and driven out of the tunnel to safety. If the undamaged part were the rear half of the train, this would be driven by the Chef du Train (conductor), who is a fully authorised driver and occupies the rear driving cab while the train travels through the tunnel for this purpose.

As the Class 374 units have entered service the Class 373 fleet has gradually been reduced. Eight remain in regular service with at least 17 scrapped and ten in storage.

===== Fleet updates =====
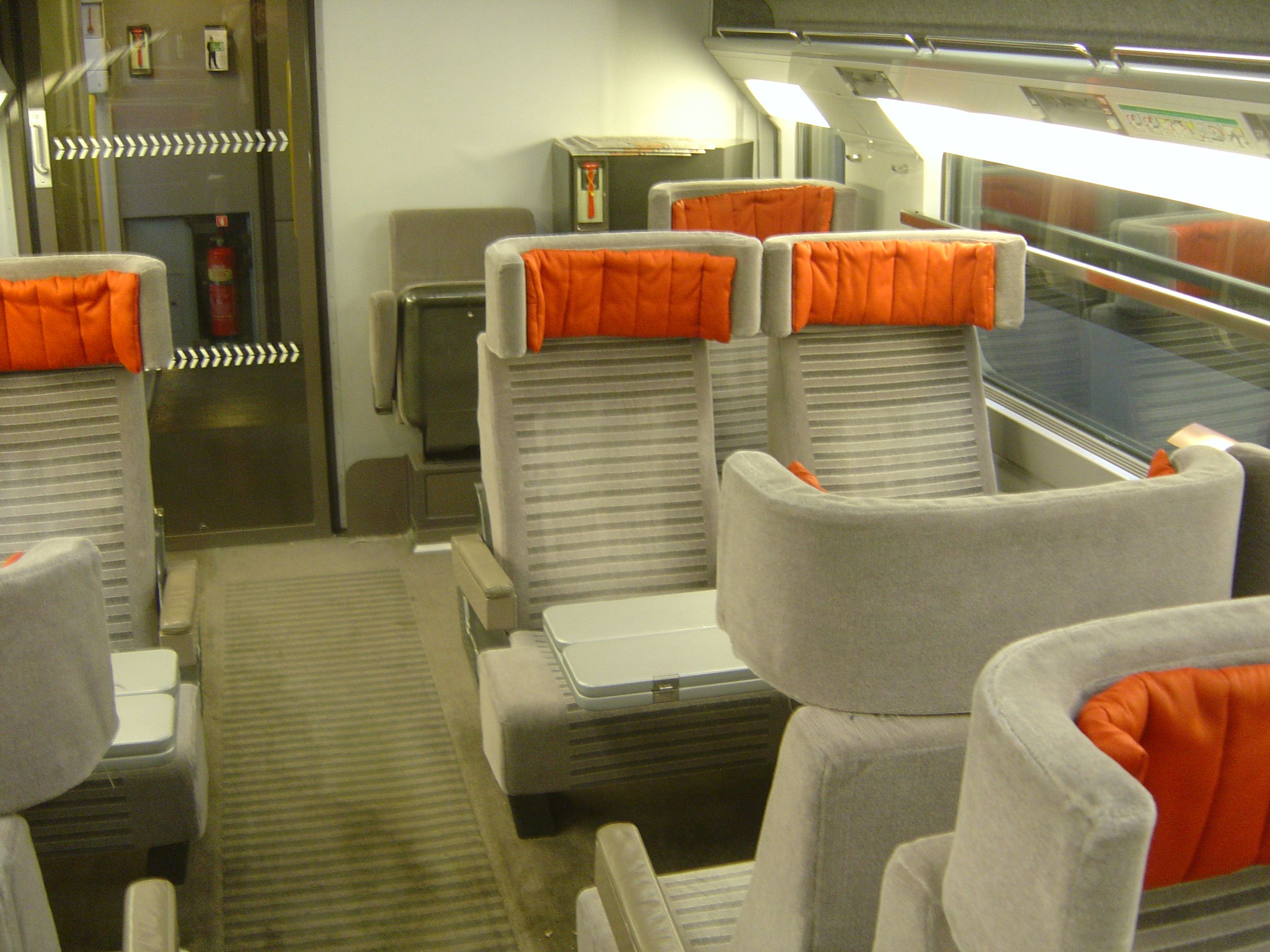
Interior of a Leisure Select Eurostar carriage

In 2004–2005 the "Inter-Capital" sets still in daily use for international services were refurbished with a new interior designed by Philippe Starck. The original grey-yellow scheme in Standard class and grey-red of First/Premium First were replaced with a grey-brown look in Standard and grey-burnt-orange in First class. Power points were added to seats in First class and coaches 5 and 14 in Standard class. Premium First class was renamed BusinessPremier.

In 2008, Eurostar announced that it would be carrying out a mid-life refurbishment of its Class 373 trains to allow the fleet to remain in service beyond 2020. This will include the 28 units making up the Eurostar fleet, but not the three Class 373/1 units used by SNCF or the seven Class 373/2 "North of London" sets. As part of the refurbishment, the Italian company Pininfarina was contracted to redesign the interiors, and The Yard Creative was selected to design the new buffet cars. On 11 May 2009 Eurostar revealed the new look for its first-class compartments. The first refurbished train was due in service in 2012, and Eurostar planned to complete the entire process by 2014. On 13 November 2014 Eurostar announced the first refurbished trains would not re-enter the fleet until the 3rd or 4th quarter of 2015 due to delays at the completion centre. The last refurbished e300 eventually re-entered service in April 2019.

==== Eurostar e320 ====
In addition to the announced mid-life update of the existing Class 373 fleet, Eurostar in 2009 began looking to purchase eight new train sets. Any new trains would need to meet the same safety rules governing passage through the Channel Tunnel as the existing Class 373 fleet. The replacement to the Class 373 trains has been decided jointly between the French Transport Ministry and the UK Department for Transport. The new trains will be equipped to use the new ERTMS in-cab signalling system, due to be fitted to High Speed 1 around 2040.

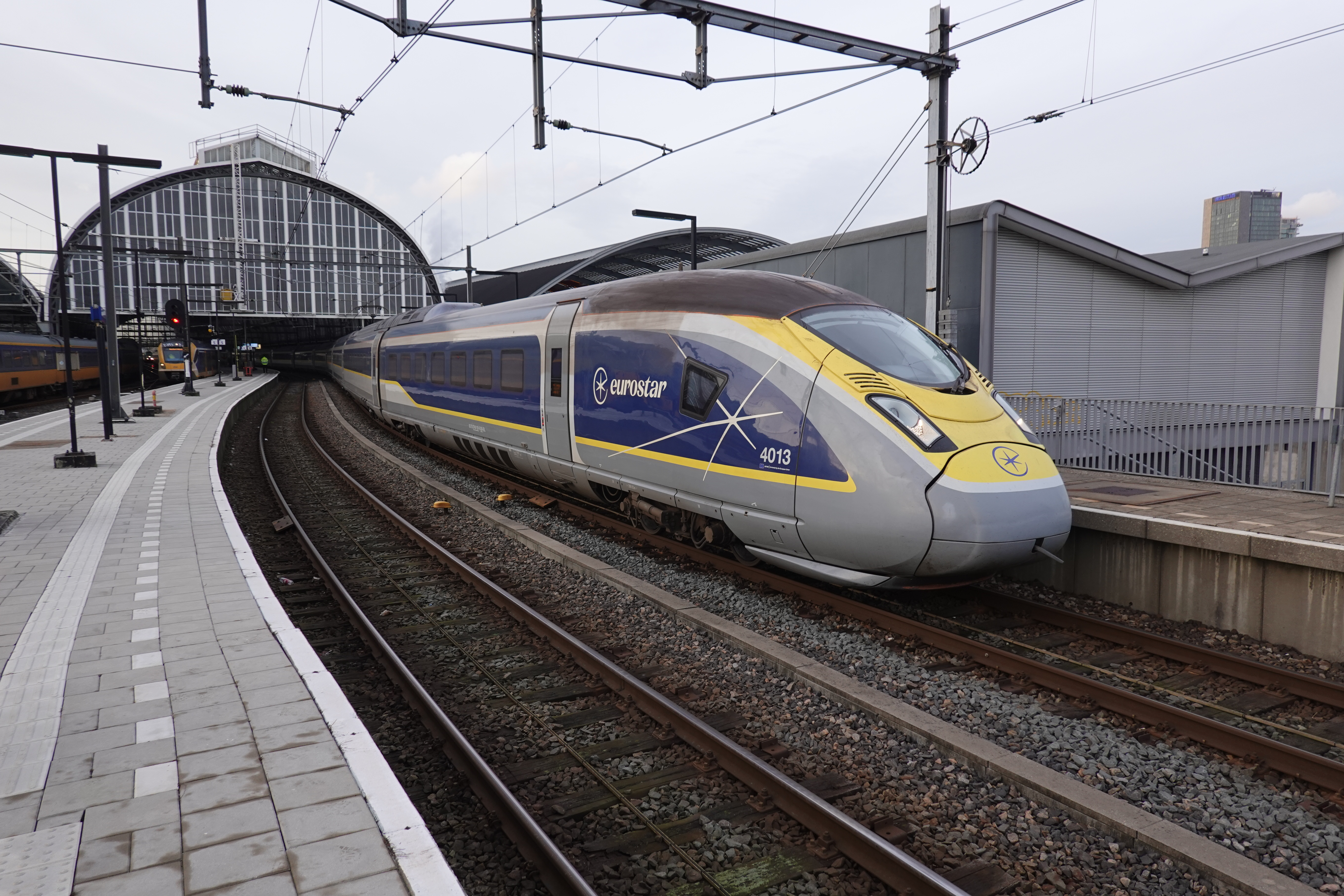
Eurostar e320 in Amsterdam CS

On 7 October 2010, it was reported that Eurostar had selected Siemens as preferred bidder to supply 10 Siemens Velaro train sets at a cost of €600 million These would be sixteen-car, self-propelled, 400 m-long (1,300 ft) train sets built to meet Channel Tunnel requirements. The top speed of the e320 train sets is 320 km/h (200 mph) with 902 seats, compared to the e300 fleet which has a top speed of 300 km/h (186 mph) and a seating capacity of 750. Total traction power will be rated at 16 MW (21,000 hp). The e320 train sets would also be quadri-current, adding the ability to run on the 15 kV 16.7 Hz AC system used in Germany, allowing for an expanded route network, including services between London and Cologne.

The selection of Siemens would see it break into the French high-speed market for the first time, as all French high-speed operators use TGV derivatives produced by Alstom. Alstom attempted legal action to prevent Eurostar from acquiring the German-built trains, claiming that the Siemens sets would breach Channel Tunnel safety rules, but the case was thrown out by the High Court in London. On 4 November 2010, Alstom lodged a complaint with the European Commission over the tendering process. Alstom then started legal action claiming that the Eurostar tender process was "ineffective", the High Court rejected the second suit in July 2011. In April 2012, Alstom said it would call off court actions against Siemens.

On 13 November 2014, Eurostar announced the purchase of an additional seven e320s for delivery in the second half of 2016. At the same time, Eurostar announced the first five e320s from the original order of ten would be available by December 2015, with the remaining five entering service by May 2016. Of the five sets ready by December 2015, three of them were planned to be used on London-Paris and London-Brussels routes.

=== Future fleet additions: Eurostar Celestia ===
In May 2024, Eurostar announced its intention to order up to 50 new trains. In October 2025, SNCF Voyageurs, acting on behalf of Eurostar, confirmed an order for 30 Avelia Horizon double-decker train sets with a four-voltage configuration, under its existing framework agreement with Alstom, with options for an additional 20 units.

The new fleet will be marketed as Eurostar Celestia, a name chosen by Eurostar staff derived from the Latin caelestis, meaning “heavenly". The 200 m (660 ft) trains will each have 540 seats and will be able to run in pairs as a 400m unit with 1,080 seats. They are scheduled for delivery by January 2031, with entry into service planned for May 2031.

If introduced on services to London, they would represent the first major fleet of double-decker trains to operate in the UK. Eurostar announced its intention to maintain the entire fleet at Temple Mills Depot in London which would be modified at a cost of €80 million to accommodate these trains, creating around 350 jobs.

=== Past fleet ===
Class	Image	Type	Top speed		Number operated	Notes
Class	Image	Type	mph	km/h	Number operated	Notes
Class 37		Diesel locomotive	90	145	12	Intended to operate sleeper services over non-electrified parts of the railway network in Britain. Eurostar retained three locomotives for the rescue of failed trains, route learning and driver training, but sold them to Direct Rail Services when the new Temple Mills Depot opened in November 2007.
Class 73		Electro-diesel locomotive	90	145	2	Were used primarily to rescue failed trains. Eurostar operated two of these from its North Pole depot until 2007, when they were loaned to a pair of educational initiatives having become redundant following the move to Temple Mills.
Class 92		Electric locomotive	87	140	7	Intended to operate the Nightstar sleeper services. Eurostar owned seven units of this class, which never saw service until they were sold in 2007 to Europorte 2.
Class 373 Eurostar e300		EMU	186	300	38	11 in operation, 10 in storage, 17 scrapped, 4 power cars preserved.

== Accidents and incidents ==
A number of technical incidents have affected Eurostar services over the years, but up to the present there has only been one major accident involving a service operated by Eurostar, a derailment in June 2000. Other incidents in the Channel Tunnel – such as the 1996 and 2008 Channel Tunnel fires – have affected Eurostar services but were not directly related to Eurostar's operations. However, the breakdowns in the tunnel, which resulted in cessation of service and inconvenience to thousands of passengers, in the run-up to Christmas 2009, proved a public-relations disaster.

=== June 2000 derailment ===
On 5 June 2000, a Eurostar train travelling from Paris to London derailed on the LGV Nord high-speed line while travelling at 290 km/h (180 mph). Fourteen people were treated for light injuries or shock, with no fatalities or major injuries. The articulated nature of the train set was credited with maintaining stability during the incident and all of the train stayed upright. The incident was caused by a traction link on the second bogie of the front power car coming loose, leading to components of the transmission system on that bogie impacting the track.

=== December 2009 snowfall breakdowns ===
During the December 2009 European snowfall, five Eurostar trains broke down inside the Channel Tunnel, after leaving France, and one in Kent on 18 December. Although the trains had been winterised, the systems did not cope with the conditions. Over 2,000 passengers were stuck inside trains inside the tunnel, and over 75,000 had their services disrupted. All Eurostar services were cancelled over 19–21 December 2009. An independent review, published on 12 February 2010, was critical of the contingency plans in place for assisting passengers stranded by the delays, calling them "insufficient."

== See also ==
- Rail transport in Europe
- High-speed rail in Europe
- Train categories in Europe
- National Rail

== Bibliography ==
- Brunhouse, Jay (1999). Traveling Europe's Trains. Pelican Publishing Company. ISBN 1-56554-854-X.
- Comfort, Nicholas (2007). The Channel Tunnel and its High Speed Links. Oakwood Press. ISBN 978-1-56554-854-1.
- Flyvbjerg, B.; Buzelius, N.; Rothengatter, W. (2003). Megaprojects and Risk: An Anatomy of Ambition. Cambridge: Cambridge University Press. ISBN 0-521-00946-4.
- Grant, John (2008). The green marketing manifesto. John Wiley. ISBN 978-0-470-72324-1.
- Griffiths, Jeanne (1995). London to Paris in Ten Minutes: The Eurostar Story. Images. ISBN 1-897817-47-9.
- Mitchell, Vic (1996). Ashford: From Steam to Eurostar. Middleton Press. ISBN 1-873793-67-7.
- Parliament: House of Commons Transport Committee (2008). Delivering a Sustainable Railway. The Stationery Office. ISBN 978-0-215-52222-1.
- Penny, Charles (1996). Channel Tunnel Transport System. Thomas Telford. ISBN 0-7277-2515-7.
- Pielow, Simon (1999). Eurostar. Ian Allan. ISBN 0-7110-2451-0.
- Piggott, Reginald; Thompson, Matt (2012). Mile by Mile London to Paris: the entire railway journey by historic Golden Arrow and modern Eurostar mapped for the interested traveller. London: Aurum. ISBN 978-1-84513-772-4.
- Roza, Greg (2004). The Incredible Story of Trains. Rosen Publishing. ISBN 0-8239-6712-3.
- Sievert, Terri (2002). The World's Fastest Trains. Capstone Press. ISBN 0-7368-1061-7.
- Whiteside, Thomas (1962). The Tunnel under the Channel. London: Rupert Hart-Davis. OCLC 498438.
- Wilson, Jeremy; Spick, Jerome (1994). Eurotunnel – The Illustrated Journey. HarperCollins. ISBN 0-00-255539-5.
