= SA Times =

South African newspaper

- Type: News & Blog
- Format: Online newspaper
- Founded: 1993
- Website: southafricantimes.co.uk

The SA Times - also known as the South African Times - is an online news and blog website published by TNT Publishing in the United Kingdom and is considered to be "The voice of South Africans living abroad".

== History ==
The SA Times used to be available in a weekly tabloid format until May 2008. It was founded in 1993 by Adam Teeger who spotted a business opportunity after South Africa rejoined the Commonwealth following the unbanning of the African National Congress. This meant that South Africans could, like other Commonwealth countries, apply for a working holiday visa to live and work in the United Kingdom for a period of two years. The United Kingdom saw an influx from South Africa, many of whom subsequently settled in the country. Today the South African population in the United Kingdom is estimated at between 700,000 and a million.

== Publishing ==
TNT Publishing, owners of TNT Magazine, the “traveller’s bible” for Antipodean and South African visitors living and working in the UK acquired the print and online titles of The SA Times and the South Africa magazine in August 2008 from SA Times owners ZA Publishing. SA Times is a complementary addition to the TNT portfolio. It is a well-respected and recognised brand within the South African community abroad.

The SA Times also publishes print special editions such as the 2009 Special South African Times Election and Freedom Day magazine. South African Times online features an Expat section with visa advice, community news and events, a Republic section for bloggers to feature issues from home, a Find a Job section featuring a job board to search for jobs abroad and a Talk section to allow all registered users an opportunity to pose questions or raise an issue.
