= TNT (magazine) =

- Categories: Travel, Lifestyle
- Frequency: Weekly
- Circulation: 75,000
- Publisher: Ali Razuki; Ghadir Razuki
- First issue: September 1983; 42 years ago
- Company: Red Reef Media
- Country: United Kingdom; Australia; New Zealand
- Based in: London
- Language: English
- Website: tntmagazine.com
- ISSN: 1957-4193

TNT is a free weekly magazine published in the United Kingdom, Australia and New Zealand.

== History ==
The magazine was founded in September 1983, from an office on the Earls Court Road, by two British Iraqi brothers, Ali and Ghadir Razuki. Their family left Iraq for the UK in 1968 when Saddam Hussein's Ba'ath Party, then led by Ahmed Hassan al-Bakr, came to power. They regularly socialised with Australians and New Zealanders, the brothers, then aged 18 and 22, set about creating a weekly magazine to meet the needs of the hundreds of thousands of Aussies, Kiwis and Saffas who visit London (South Africans did not arrive in large numbers until the post-apartheid era in the early 1990s). The first edition had only 48 pages, but within several years this had increased to 350 pages, with a weekly print run of 75,000.

== Distribution ==
The UK version was not the first magazine to reach readers via distribution bins in key areas across London. It followed a long period dominated by the Australasian Express and London's Australasian (later Alternative) Magazine (LAM) in Shepherds Bush. It was also available from pubs, hostels and travel agents, then later from internet cafes. The Australian and New Zealand versions followed the same distribution methods.

In the UK, it is aimed at Australians, New Zealanders and South Africans living, working and travelling in the UK (though mostly in London). In Australia, the magazine is aimed at British, Irish, European and, increasingly, North American travellers. The magazine focuses on travel, jobs, accommodation, plus news and sport from home, and offers tips on living in London (UK version) and Australasia (Australia & New Zealand versions).

TNT UK also publishes a guide to the UK and Ireland for Australians, New Zealanders and South Africans planning to move to the UK or Ireland, while TNT Downunder produces a similar annual title targeting those wanting to travel (and in many cases move) to Australia, New Zealand or Fiji.

== Other media ==
TNT Multimedia, which owns the UK magazine, also owns South African Times and South African Times.co.uk, and brings out quarterly teaching and finance directories, among other ad hoc supplements.

TNTMagazine.com, linked to the UK magazine, was relaunched in October 2008 having previously existed under various urls.

TNT Jobs, a standalone jobs board, advertises jobs in the UK, Australia and New Zealand.

The magazine also runs regular travel and recruitment exhibitions for its readers, as well as an annual travel writing and photography awards competition.

In 2000, TNT magazine was sold by the brothers to Trader Media Group for a sum reportedly in excess of £30 million, and in February 2008, Trader Media Group sold it on to Red Reef Media.

== Use of the TNT name ==
It was originally intended to be the Independent Travel and News, however this clashed with Independent Television News, so they came up with The News and Travel – TNT. A letter was written to the Australian-founded freight company, TNT, who did not object to the new magazine’s name. However, two years later, TNT’s freight chairman, on a visit from Australia in London, snared a copy of the magazine from opposite Harrods. The magazine soon got a letter saying it could not use the TNT name. The Razuki brothers had kept TNT freight’s initial approval letter, which settled matters in their favour.

In September 2013, TNT Multimedia was formally put into administration.
