= 1996 Channel Tunnel fire =

Non-fatal train incident

Coordinates: 51°N 1.5°E

- Location of the 1996 Channel Tunnel fire

Details
- Date: 18 November 1996; 29 years ago 21:48 CET
- Location: Channel Tunnel; 19 mi (31 km) north west from Sangatte
- Operator: Eurotunnel
- Owner: Getlink
- Service: LeShuttle
- Incident type: Fire
- Cause: Unknown, possibly arson

Statistics
- Trains: 1
- Vehicles: 15^{[a]}
- Passengers: 31
- Crew: 3
- Deaths: 0
- Injured: 2
- Damage: Substantial damage to tunnel infrastructure £200 million (1997 GBP)
- 15 vehicles involved were being transported on a train

The Channel Tunnel fire of 18 November 1996 occurred on a train carrying Heavy Goods Vehicles (HGVs) and their drivers through the Channel Tunnel from France to the United Kingdom. The fire was seen on the train as it entered the tunnel and, in line with the policy at the time, an attempt was made to drive to the UK where the fire would be dealt with. However, after an indication of a serious problem with the train, the driver stopped at 21:58 CET, 19 kilometres (12 mi) into the tunnel. The locomotive and passenger coach were rapidly enveloped in thick smoke, and the locomotive lost power. Reconfiguration of the tunnel ventilation systems was delayed, but by 22:30 all passengers and crew were safe, in the service tunnel, with minor injuries.

Firefighters fought the fire overnight, and it was declared out at 11:15 the following morning. The fire damaged about 500 metres (1,600 ft) of tunnel. The HGV shuttle service was suspended, and all other services restarted using single-line working in the adjacent tunnel, reducing capacity until repairs were completed. The tunnel was fully reopened, and the HGV shuttle service was restored on 15 May 1997.

Eurotunnel changed the policy of attempting to run trains on fire through the tunnel to one of stopping the train and evacuating the passengers as soon as possible.

== Fire ==
The Channel Tunnel is a 50.45 km (31.35 mi) long undersea railway tunnel linking Folkestone in the United Kingdom with Coquelles near Calais in northern France. A 4.8 m (16 ft) diameter service tunnel is positioned between two 7.6 m (25 ft) diameter running tunnels each with standard gauge rail track with an overhead line energised at 25 kV 50 Hz. There are connecting passages from the running tunnels to the service tunnel every 375 m (1,230 ft) and piston relief ducts connect the running tunnels managing the pressure changes due to the movement of trains. Ventilation is provided from both France and the UK; in the event of a fire, a supplementary ventilation system is available. There are crossovers linking the two rail tracks at the tunnel entrances and in two caverns under the sea, dividing the running tunnels into six 'intervals'. The system is controlled from a control centre in the UK terminal with a stand-by centre on the French side.

Typical tunnel cross section, with a service tunnel (B) and piston relief duct (D) between two rail tunnels (A)

The tunnel carries through traffic in the form of high-speed Eurostar passenger trains and international rail freight trains. Two types of Eurotunnel Shuttle transport vehicles between the terminals – an enclosed type carrying coaches, cars and passengers with their vehicles and an open lattice type carrying Heavy Goods Vehicles (HGV), their drivers traveling in an amenity coach.

On 18 November 1996, at 21:48 CET a fire about 2 m by 2 m (6 ft by 6 ft) was seen on HGV Shuttle No. 7539, carrying 31 passengers and three crew, as it entered the French portal. The driver was told there was a fire on his train and that the train would be diverted to the emergency siding on arrival in the UK. When the fire was confirmed a few minutes later, the control centre restricted the speed of all trains in the tunnels to 100 km/h (62 mph) and attempted to close the piston relief ducts and doors in the crossover caverns to limit the area of the tunnel affected by smoke. Five minutes later, a train fault with risk of derailment was indicated to the driver. The train was brought to a controlled stop adjacent to a door leading to the service tunnel, at 21:58, about 19 km (12 mi) from the French portal. After stopping, power from the overhead line was lost and smoke filled the tunnel; crew members could not see the service tunnel doors. Smoke began to enter the coach and the crew and passengers suffered from smoke inhalation. The supplementary ventilation system was turned on and ran for seven minutes with the blades set incorrectly. Once the blades were set correctly, the smoke cleared sufficiently for the passengers and crew to evacuate. Twenty six passengers and the driver were taken out of the tunnel by a tourist shuttle that had stopped in the adjacent running tunnel. The remaining people were treated on site before being evacuated via the service tunnel. All passengers and crew were taken to a hospital in France for observation.

== Response ==
Response teams were mobilised on both sides of the channel, the French team of eight firefighters leaving at 21:56 and the British team of eight firefighters leaving at 22:03. Initially, there was confusion as to the location of the train and the French team found the passengers in the service tunnel at 22:28. The driver was rescued from his cab a minute later and a search of the coach and front locomotive confirmed no-one was on board the train. With the French team treating the casualties, the fire fighting was initially left to the British team. A reconnaissance team located the fire; the British second response was requested and Kent Fire Brigade informed of the fire. While the fire fighting was being planned the French second response team arrived and took control.

The fire was located between two cross-passages and teams of firefighters from both countries fought the fire for the next five hours. Each shift of firefighters only worked in the running tunnel for short periods before returning to the service tunnel. The water supply was restricted, mainly due to leaking pipework in the south running tunnel, and the number of jets was reduced until a Eurotunnel engineer reconfigured the valves.

The fire was mostly out by 05:00 the following morning and declared extinguished at 11:15. There were no fatalities, although the people on the train suffered smoke inhalation, and there were no reported injuries to the firefighters.

== Aftermath ==
Along a 50 m (160 ft) length of tunnel, the normally 40 cm (16 in) thick tunnel lining was reduced to a mean depth of 17 cm (6.7 in), with the thinnest area being 2 cm (0.79 in). The chalk marl showed no signs of failing or collapsing but colliery arches were installed as a precaution. Over a 240 m (790 ft) long section (70 m (230 ft) towards Britain, 170 m (560 ft) towards France), damage to the concrete extended as far back as the first set of reinforcement bars. Superficial damage to the surface of the concrete segments was evident along a further 190 m (620 ft) of tunnel length. In the vicinity of the fire, services were destroyed, including high-voltage cables, low-voltage cables, communications, lighting systems, traction and junction boxes over a length of 800 m (2,600 ft). 500 m (1,600 ft) of track had to be replaced, as did 800 m (2,600 ft) of overhead line, 800 m (2,600 ft) of refrigeration pipe and signalling equipment over a length of 1,500 m (4,900 ft). Four escape cross-passages and five pressure relief ducts had to be refitted with new doors and dampers.

The damage was located in interval 3. Service through the tunnel restarted using single track working over the parallel interval 4. In a phased re-opening, freight train service was restored on 29 November 1996, followed by Eurostar services on 4 December, and tourist shuttles on 10 December for cars and 6 January 1997 for coaches. Agreement had been reached on the repairs by 24 January 1997. The civil engineering work, repairing the tunnel wall, was completed by the French contractor Freyssinet in 60 days. This was followed by the replacement of the track, overhead line and signalling by Eurotunnel, completed in less than a month, and the tunnel was fully reopened on 15 May 1997.

The damage to the train was concentrated in the rear half. The front locomotive, amenity coach and front rake (including a truck carrying dangerous goods) suffered minor damage from heat and smoke: all were re-usable after thorough cleaning and minor repairs. The rear rake suffered major thermal damage: eleven wagons and the rear locomotive were scrapped, as were most of the HGVs being carried.

== Investigations ==
Three separate investigations were conducted. The first was a French judicial inquiry into the cause of the fire, the second was an internal inquiry by Eurotunnel and the third was an inquiry by the Channel Tunnel Safety Authority (CTSA), a bi-national body formed of personnel from British and French railway safety bodies, fire brigades and government departments.

The usage of the HGV shuttles had been approved with the plan that, in the event of fire, the shuttle was to either continue to the terminal or to detach the locomotive and passenger coach. Neither of these happened, as the fire had damaged the train such that it was forced to stop, and the overhead line failed four seconds after the train had come to a stand. The concept of an 'unconfirmed alarm' meant that the incident was not treated seriously until five minutes after the train entered the tunnel on fire. The CTSA report recommended that all alarms be treated seriously.

The French crossover doors and one of the piston relief duct doors failed to close properly, allowing smoke to enter the other running tunnel. Furthermore, control centre staff were overwhelmed, having not been sufficiently trained for an emergency, and were using procedures and systems that were complex. This led to, for example, the supplementary ventilation system being brought online late and running incorrectly for fifteen minutes.

== Legacy ==
Additional staff were placed on duty in the control room. Eurotunnel's policy of attempting to drive trains through the tunnel in the event of an on-board fire with a backup plan of uncoupling the locomotive and amenity coach and driving out were abandoned and replaced by plans to bring trains to a controlled stop and evacuate the occupants into the service tunnel. Liaison between Eurotunnel and emergency services was improved with joint exercises and exchanges of personnel between the British and French fire brigades, so that each had experience with the other's operational procedures. Communications were also improved.

== See also ==
- 2008 Channel Tunnel fire
- List of transportation fires

== Further information ==
- First Sight: How safe is the tunnel?. BBC Television. January 1997. (Television production)
- Beech, J. (1990). "Lecture to the Institution of Mechanical Engineers".
- Bradbury, W. M. S. (March 1998). The Channel Tunnel Fire: Design Implications for Other Tunnel Systems. Seminar on Consequences of the Channel Tunnel Fire for all Road and Rail Tunnels.
- Fudger, G. (March 1998). Implications for Procedures in all Road and Rail Tunnels. Seminar on Consequences of the Channel Tunnel Fire for all Road and Rail Tunnels.
- French, S. C. (October 1994). Proceedings of the International Conference on Fires in Tunnels. Borås, Sweden. ISBN 91-7848-513-4.
- Liew, S. K.; Deaves, D.M; Blyth, A.G. (1998). Eurotunnel HGV fire on 18 November 1996 – Fire Development and Effects. Proceedings of the 3rd International Conference on Safety in Road and Rail Tunnels. ITC.
- Kirkland, C., ed. (1995). Engineering the Channel Tunnel. Chapman & Hall. ISBN 0-419-17920-8.
- Welsh, W. (2001). "Channel Tunnel Fire (UK)" (PDF). Lessons Learnt from Tunnel Accidents. Archived from the original (contribution from Kent Fire Brigade to NEDIES project) on 10 May 2006.
