= 2008 Channel Tunnel fire =

Non-fatal train fire

Coordinates: 50.97°N 1.66°E

- Location of the 2008 Channel Tunnel fire

Details
- Date: 11 September 2008; 13:57 UTC
- Location: Channel Tunnel; 11 km (6.8 mi) north west from Coquelles
- Country: between United Kingdom and France
- Operator: Eurotunnel
- Incident type: Fire

Statistics
- Trains: 1
- Passengers: 32
- Crew: 2
- Deaths: 0
- Injured: 14
- Damage: Substantial damage to tunnel infrastructure

On 11 September 2008, a France-bound Eurotunnel Shuttle train carrying heavy goods vehicles (HGVs) and their drivers caught fire while travelling through the Channel Tunnel. The fire lasted for sixteen hours and reached temperatures of up to 1,000 °C (1,830 °F).

Of the 32 people aboard the train, 14 suffered minor injuries, including smoke inhalation, and were taken to the hospital. When the fire was reported, the tunnel was immediately shut to all services except emergency traffic. The undamaged south tunnel reopened on 13 September; a freight train entered the tunnel at Folkestone at 00:08 BST and limited service began, with trains travelling in turn in alternating directions in the south tunnel. By the end of September, two-thirds of the north tunnel had reopened. Full service resumed in February 2009, after the completion of repairs costing €60 million.

The fire was the third to force the tunnel's closure since its opening in 1994, the first being the 1996 Channel Tunnel fire, the second an August 2006 fire that broke out on a truck aboard a HGV Shuttle, shutting the tunnel down for several hours.

== Fire ==
The fire was reported on 11 September 2008, at approximately 13:57 UTC (14:57 BST / 15:57 CEST) in the North Tunnel 11 kilometres (6.8 mi) from the French tunnel entrance. The shuttle was carrying 27 vehicles, and the blaze spread to other trucks during the evening, destroying six carriages and one locomotive. The fire continued to burn overnight and was reported to have been put out by 06:00 UTC the following day, although fire crews continued to smother nearby minor fires for a further two hours. More than 300 firefighters from both sides of the English Channel helped tackle the blaze, supported by emergency services from East and West Sussex, London and Essex.

A simple cross-section view of the Channel Tunnel facing towards the UK

The 32 people on board the train were led to safety down a separate service tunnel; fourteen suffered minor injuries, including smoke inhalation, and were taken to the hospital.

A lorry thought to be carrying 100 kilograms (220 lb) of phenol (carbolic acid), a toxic product used in the pharmaceutical industry, was initially believed to be close to the seat of the fire; however, it only carried 100 grams (3.5 oz). Eyewitness accounts state that two loud bangs, described as explosions, were heard before thick smoke swept through the carriage. The train came to a grinding halt and the lights went out. Further eyewitness accounts suggest that the emergency exit was jammed, and that one passenger smashed a window with a hammer to climb out. The temperature in the tunnel was described as "very hot".

About 650 metres (2,130 ft) of tunnel were damaged by the fire, 50% more than during the November 1996 fire.

== Aftermath ==
=== Tunnel closure and reopening ===
Eurotunnel initially announced that all services would be suspended until 14 September; however, an inspection uncovered no damage to the south tunnel, and empty test shuttles were trialled during the evening of 12 September. A freight train was permitted to enter the tunnel in the early morning hours of 13 September, and limited Eurostar services resumed at 06:00 BST that morning, with 18 services in each direction, including a return journey from London to Disneyland Paris. Some passengers arriving at St Pancras Station reported smelling smoke whilst travelling through the tunnel. A limited passenger shuttle service restarted on 14 September with the 06:18 BST from Folkestone. Services were increased when the section of the north tunnel was reopened from Folkestone to the UK crossover on 22 September, and again on 29 September when the tunnel between the crossovers was brought back into service. While the final sixth of the tunnel was being repaired, trains were limited to 100 kilometres per hour (62 mph) by the Intergovernmental Commission. Service levels were reduced so that only 90% of Eurostar services, 60% of Eurotunnel passenger vehicle shuttles and 70% of the HGV shuttles were able to run, costing Eurotunnel an estimated £185 million (€200 million) in lost revenue.

=== Tunnel repair ===
Repair works were estimated at £60 million. On 18 October, the investigation authority released the damaged section of tunnel back to Eurotunnel, which then assessed the tunnel lining and replaced over one thousand bolts holding the concrete lining. The damaged concrete was then removed with high pressure water jets, damage to the reinforcing steel mesh was repaired, and a new concrete lining applied through a shotcreting process. The process used about 4000 tonnes of new concrete and was completed in early January 2009. During the remainder of January, tunnel equipment was repaired and replaced as necessary, with the installation of overhead line equipment on 28 January. After test runs were carried out, Eurotunnel reopened on 9 February 2009.

=== Eurotunnel response ===
When the train stopped in the tunnel due to a fire, the procedure was that the smoke had to be removed by the high powered ventilation before an evacuation could be allowed. However, when the train came to a halt, people saw the smoke and some panicked, broke a window and started evacuating on their own. The evacuation procedure is now shown in nine languages in the lorry driver's club car. Eurotunnel was also concerned because it took 75 minutes before the fire services started to tackle the blaze and that the ventilation was on during this time, fanning the fire and increasing the damage. After tests in April 2010, Eurotunnel built four "fire-fighting stations" in the tunnel. When a fire is detected on a train, it continues to the next station, where passengers and crew are evacuated into the service tunnel while an automatic system puts the fire out with water mist. These stations became operational in autumn 2011 and were tested in January 2012.

=== Investigation ===
The investigation was led by the French Land Transport Accident Investigation Bureau (Bureau d'Enquêtes sur les Accidents de Transport Terrestre) and supported by the British Rail Accident Investigation Branch. The report was published on 22 November 2010.

== See also ==
- 1996 Channel Tunnel fire
- Channel Tunnel Safety Authority
- List of transportation fires
