= Dawson v Thomson Airways Ltd =

2014 British landmark case

Dawson v Thomson Airways Ltd was a landmark case taken to the Court of Appeal of England and Wales in May 2014, which created a binding case law for all future flight delay compensation claims in England and Wales.

== Facts ==
The case specifically related to flight number BY5143 which was scheduled to depart on 25 December 2006 at 11:30 a.m. from London Gatwick Airport to Puerto Plata in the Dominican Republic. The Thomson Airways Ltd flight was subject to a delay of 6 hours and 26 minutes.

== History of the case ==
In December 2012, Mr Dawson brought a claim against Thomson Airways Ltd, asking for €600 based on the length of the delay and the distance of the flight. Thomson Airways Ltd instructed Herbert Smith Freehills to act on their behalf and initially filed a defence citing extraordinary circumstances under Flight Delay Compensation Regulation EU 261/2004.

Thomson Airways Ltd were represented by Robert Lawson QC of Quadrant Chambers. Mr Dawson appeared as a litigant in person.

The matter was initially listed for a hearing at small claims court in Cambridge but when the court recognised the complexity of the argument, the matter was allocated for a multi-track hearing with a time estimate of 1 day. The matter was heard before His Honour Judge Yelton on 15 July 2013.

The court heard that Thomson Airways Ltd had dropped their argument of 'extraordinary circumstances'. Instead, accepting that they would have been liable to pay Mr Dawson compensation had he brought his claim within two years. They based their limitation point argument on the 1997 case of Sidhu v British Airways Plc, in which Lord Hope said:

"The intention seems to be to provide a secure regime, within which the restriction on the carrier's freedom of contract is to operate. Benefits are given to the passenger in return, but only in clearly defined circumstances to which the limits of liability set out by the Convention are to apply. To permit exceptions, whereby a passenger would sue outwith the Convention for losses sustained in the course of international carriage by air, would distort the whole system, even in cases for which the Convention did not create any liability on the part of the carrier."

Mr Dawson relied on the case of Cuadrench Moré v Koninglijke Luchvaart Maatschappij which stated that EU Regulation 261/2004 provided no limitation period and as such the time limit for a claim under the Regulation was in accordance with the rules of each member state. In the Moré case, which took place in Barcelona, Spain, that time limit was 10 years. Mr Dawson therefore argued that the Limitation Act 1980 was applicable in this instance, giving him 6 years.

His Honour Judge Yelton said: "The issue in this case can be simply stated. It is whether the limitation period for a claim of this nature is (a) two years, as provided by the Montreal Convention of 1999 or (b) six years, as provided six years, as provided by S9 of the Limitation Act 1980. If it is for two years the claim fails, if it is six years the claim succeeds."

His Honour Judge Yelton found Thomson Airways Ltd's argument to be "specious" and found in favour of Mr Dawson stating:

"It seems to be me that if I apply the principles set down by the European Court, which are very clear, compensation under Article 7 is outside, not within, the provisions of the Montreal Convention and so in those circumstances the time limit is not fixed by that Convention but by the general rules: in other words it is 6 years. It seems to me that it is a bold submission on the part of the defendant that the court should not follow Moré, or perhaps more exactly that it should not follow its spirit."

However, recognising the importance of the case in creating a binding precedent, His Honour Judge Yelton gave Thomson Airways Ltd the right to take the case to the Court of Appeal.

Mr Dawson instructed Bott & Co Solicitors to represent him in court. The appeal took place in Court 69 of the Royal Courts of Justice on Tuesday 13th and Wednesday 14 May 2014 before Lord Justice Moore-Brick, Lord Justice Kitchin, and Lord Justice Ryder. The judges reserved their judgement to be handed down in the Supreme Court of the United Kingdom at a later date.

== Outcome ==
On 19 June 2014 The Supreme Court rejected Thomson Airways Ltd's appeal and ruled that Mr Dawson be paid €600 in flight compensation.

== Significance ==
The landmark ruling of "Dawson v Thomson Airways Ltd" created a binding case law in flight delay compensation, allowing UK residents to claim up to €600 compensation for delays as far back as six years.

Figures from the Civil Aviation Authority (CAA) show on average 221.1 million terminal passengers per year use UK airports. According to statistics released by the European Commission an average of 1.5 per cent of flights to/from British airports each year are delayed be three hours or more and could be potentially claimable.

This is equivalent to approximately 3.27 million passengers per year for an additional four years (total 13.08 million passengers). According to the final European Commission report 'Evaluation of Regulation 261/2004', an estimated 13% of flight delays are caused by extraordinary circumstances and therefore under the terms of the regulation would be exempt from paying compensation. This still leaves an estimated total of 11.4 million passengers who stand to be affected by this case.

The average claim amount is €430 meaning potentially €4 billion worth of compensation will be available dependent upon this case.

In the same month, Bott & Co Solicitors, was involved in another landmark case regarding UK flight compensation law, in Huzar v Jet2.com.

== Dawson v Thomson Airways Ltd in the media ==
- AOL Travel (20 June 2014)
- BBC News (19 June 2014)
- The Guardian (19 June 2014):
- The Independent (1 November 2014):
- The Telegraph (31 October 2014):
- The Telegraph (19 June 2014):
