= Rail Passenger Rights Regulation 2021 =

European Union legislation

Regulation (EU) 2021/782
- European Union regulation
- Text with EEA relevance
- Title: Regulation of the European Parliament and of the Council on rail passengers’ rights and obligations (recast)
- Made by: European Parliament and Council of the European Union
- Journal reference: L172, 17 May 2021, p. 1-52

History
- Date made: 29 April 2021
- Entry into force: 6 June 2021
- Applies from: 7 June 2023

Other legislation
- Replaces: Regulation (EC) No 1371/2007

The Rail Passenger Rights Regulation 2021 (EU) 2021/782 gives railway passengers basic rights in EU law to refunds and minimum levels of service. As a regulation, it has mandatory application without the need for implementing legislation. Before this many countries, such as the United Kingdom, had no rights set in law for rail passengers. The Regulation creates minimum rights which every member state law, and every rail undertaking, may improve upon.

A 2007 version of the Regulation was updated by Regulation (EU) No 2021/782, applicable from June 7, 2023.

== Contents ==
The following is a summary of the Regulation's provisions:

- article 3, definitions
- art 4, transport contract conditions governed by Annex I
- art 5, non-discriminatory contract conditions and tariffs on basis of nationality
- art 6, enables bikes on trains if it does not adversely affect rail
- art 7, obligations to passengers under this Regulation cannot be waived, but duties can be more favourable
- art 8, info on discontinuing services
- art 9, travel info, set out in Annex I and II
- art 10, tickets and reservations by ticket offices, machines, telephone, web or on board
- art 11, travel info and reservation
- art 12, through-tickets
- art 13, liability for passengers and luggage under Annex I
- art 14, insurance, obligations in Directive 95/18/EC art 9.
- art 15, advance payments
- art 16, if a railway contests responsibility for injury it should make every effort to help a passenger in claiming from a third party
- art 17, delay liability, Annex I. A passenger facing a delay of an hour or more may request a partial reimbursement of the price paid for the ticket
- art 18, reimbursement and re-routing
- art 19, compensation of ticket price: 25% of the ticket price for a 60-119 min delay, 50% for 120 min or more. Season tickets in accordance with company policy. Threshold claim is €4.
- art 20, assistance, kept informed. For delay over 60mins, free meals and refreshments if can reasonably be supplied on train or station, hotel or accommodation, transport from the train to railway station if blocked.
- art 21, disabled right to transport
- art 22, information
- art 23-25, accessibility and assistance on board, etc
- art 27, manage risks of security
- art 28, companies shall set up a complaint handling mechanism and make contact details widely known
- art 29, service quality standards
- art 30, info and enforcement
- art 31, Member States must designate national enforcement bodies
- arts 35-41, final provisions
- Annex I, Extract from Uniform Rules concerning the contract for international carriage of passengers and luggage by rail (CIV)

== See also ==
- EU law
- Single European Railway Directive 2012 and Fourth Railway Package
- Flight Compensation Regulation 2004
- Bus Passenger Rights Regulation 2011
- UK enterprise law
- Railways in the UK
