= AJC =

AJC may refer to:

== Education ==
- Academy of Journalism and Communication, a university in Vietnam
- Anderson Junior College, a two-year school in Singapore

== Jewish-related organisations ==
- American Jewish Committee, global Jewish and civil rights advocacy organization
- American Jewish Congress, American Jewish advocacy and public policy organization
- Atlantic Jewish Council, a Canadian partner of the Centre for Israel and Jewish Affairs
- Auschwitz Jewish Center in Oświęcim, a museum and cultural center in Oświęcim, Poland

== Technology ==
- Anti-jitter circuit, an electronic device designed to reduce jitter in a regular pulse signal
- Australia-Japan Cable, a submarine telecommunications cable system

== Other uses ==
- Agreement on Journey Continuation, an agreement between European rail operators to allow passengers in case of a missed connection
- AJC Architects, an Australian architectural practice
- The Atlanta Journal-Constitution, an American newspaper in Georgia
- Australian Jockey Club, a predecessor racing organization to the Australian Turf Club

== See also ==
- Jewish Council of Australia
