= Train ticket =

Entrance ticket used for rail travel

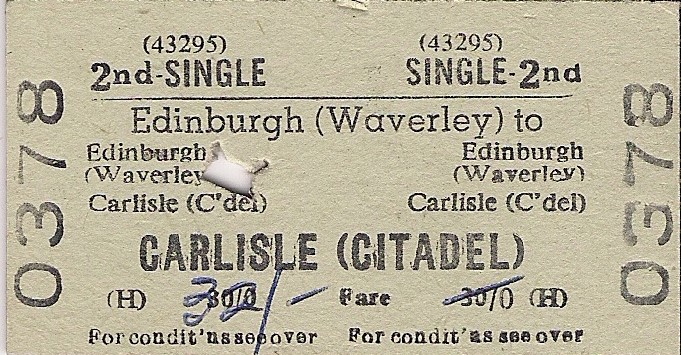
A British Rail Edmondson railway ticket from the 1970s, the hole punched through the ticket shows that it has been checked by a conductor

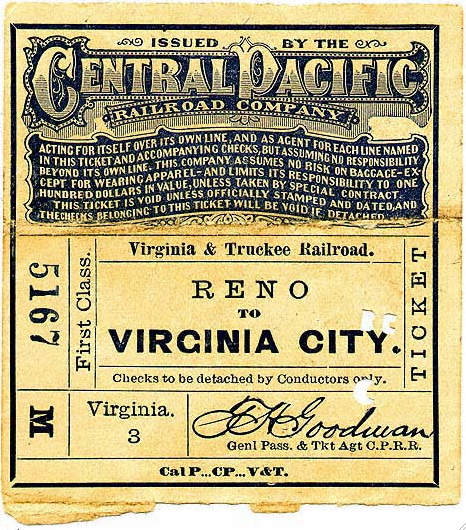
An 1878 Central Pacific Railroad issued ticket for passage from Reno to Virginia City on the Virginia & Truce Railroad

A train ticket is a transit pass ticket issued by a railway operator that enables the bearer to travel on the operator's network or a partner's network. Tickets can authorize the bearer to travel a set itinerary at a specific time (common for long-distance railroads), a set itinerary at any time (common for commuter railroads), a set itinerary at multiple times, or an arbitrary itinerary at specific times. The last two categories are often called passes: the former is often sold as a discounted block of trips for commuters; the latter is often sold to vacationers, such as European Eurail passes.

In some countries, like Italy, and some local railways in Germany, conductors are not used. Instead passengers are expected to validate tickets in a special stamping machine before entering the train. A system of coupons that are validated with a special machine exists on the Mumbai Suburban Railway where combinations of coupons of denominations are used to get the corresponding ticket value. There may or may not be a conductor later on double-checking that correct tickets are actually held. Yet further systems are possible, for example in Japan, the London Underground and in local traffic in Stockholm, the platforms are blocked by turnstiles, forcing the acquisition of a ticket before entering the platform.

Some train tickets are available with an option to add bus travel at either end of the train ticketed journey, as part of a wider transport network. For instance, the Plusbus scheme in the United Kingdom offers bus travel on an integrated ticket for an additional fee. In Germany, some long-distance train tickets include a "city ticket" valid on the public transit system of origin and destination.

== History ==
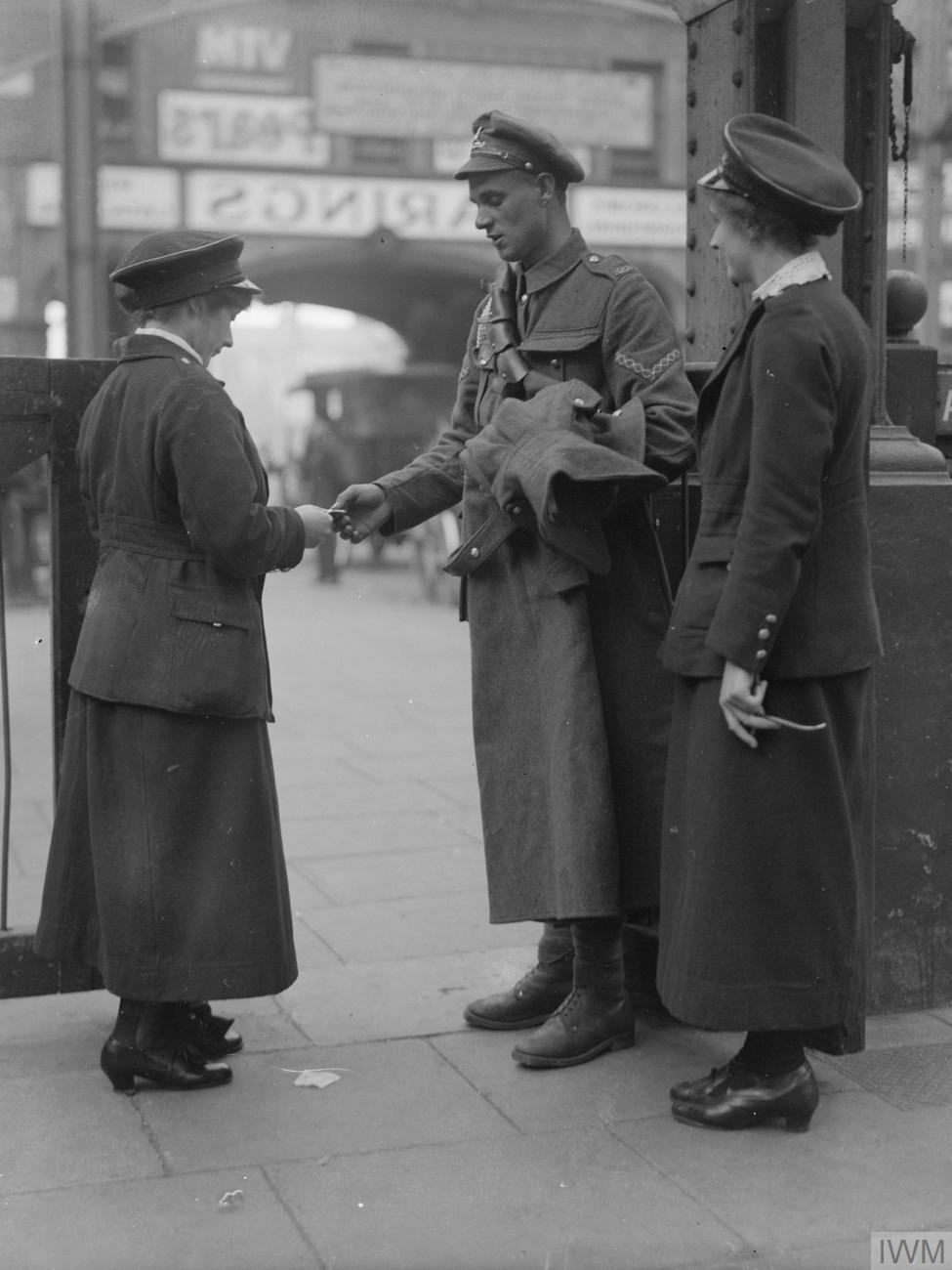
Rail transport staff collecting tickets at a train station in the United Kingdom during the Great War

Early tickets were similar to a form of currency issued by individual railroads, sold by agents and collected by conductors who were audited by the railroad to be sure ticket inventories matched reported passenger earnings. As continuous travel over several connected railways became common, Coupon tickets with serrated portions for each railway company might be issued at the origin of travel and sequentially collected by conductors of the railways providing travel to avoid the necessity for purchasing additional tickets at each transfer point.

== Seat checks ==
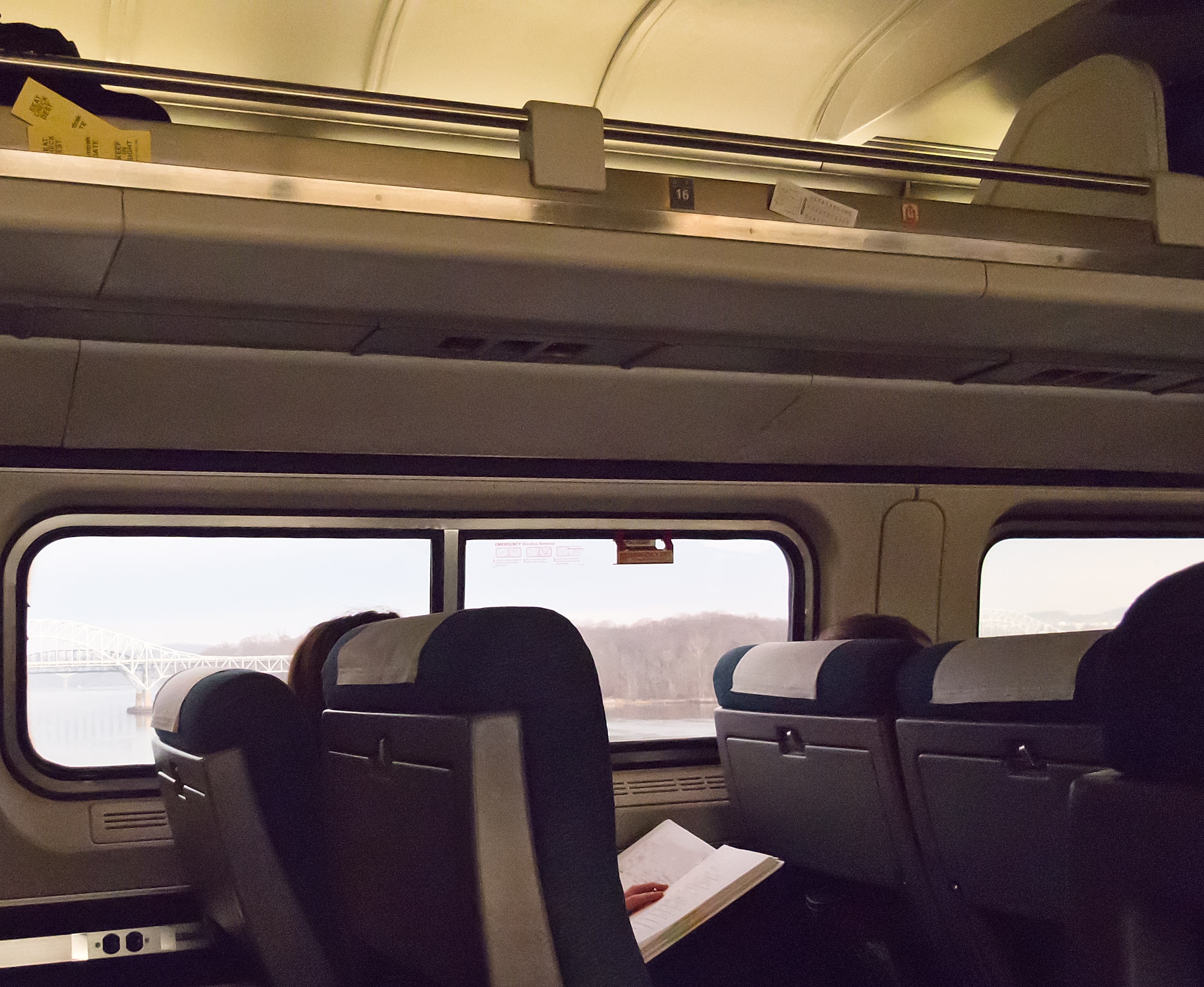
Seat checks above the heads of the passengers, on an Amtrak train (Northeast Regional) in 2012.

In the US, a conductor may also provide the passenger with a seat check — another voucher indicating how far the passenger may travel on the system — or attach it over the seat also punched by the conductor showing the passenger's destination, along with conductors organizing train seating by destination during boarding. Some systems (Amtrak, for instance) have two-part tickets that permit the passenger to retain a cancelled ticket stub; others (the New Jersey Transit and Massachusetts Bay Transportation Authority commuter rail systems, for instance) do not. Seat checks are changed frequently to ensure that passengers cannot retain and reuse them from journey to journey. (Conductors typically collect checks before stops to prevent this.)

== Through-ticket ==
A through-ticket is a single contract for a multi leg journey that guarantees certain passenger rights and protections in case of disruptions on one leg of the journey, e.g a missed train.

In European rail, through-tickets are regulated by Rail Passenger Rights Regulation 2021.

Until 2019, Eurostar had an agreement with Deutsche Bahn that allowed passengers to travel on a through-ticket by train from the UK via Brussels to Germany. Under the agreement, passengers could travel on a single through-ticket with passenger rights in case of disruption of one train.

== Electronic ticketing ==
Increasingly, electronic tickets are being used as replacements for paper tickets. Amtrak, as of June 30, 2012 offers electronic tickets on all train routes. These have QR codes to identify the ticket's validity and can be printed out or shown to a conductor on a smartphone or Apple Watch screen. Similar systems are used by Eurostar, Chiltern Railways and Great Western Railway in the UK.

In India, an SMS sent by the Indian Railways, along with a valid proof of identity is considered equivalent to a ticket.

== Gallery ==
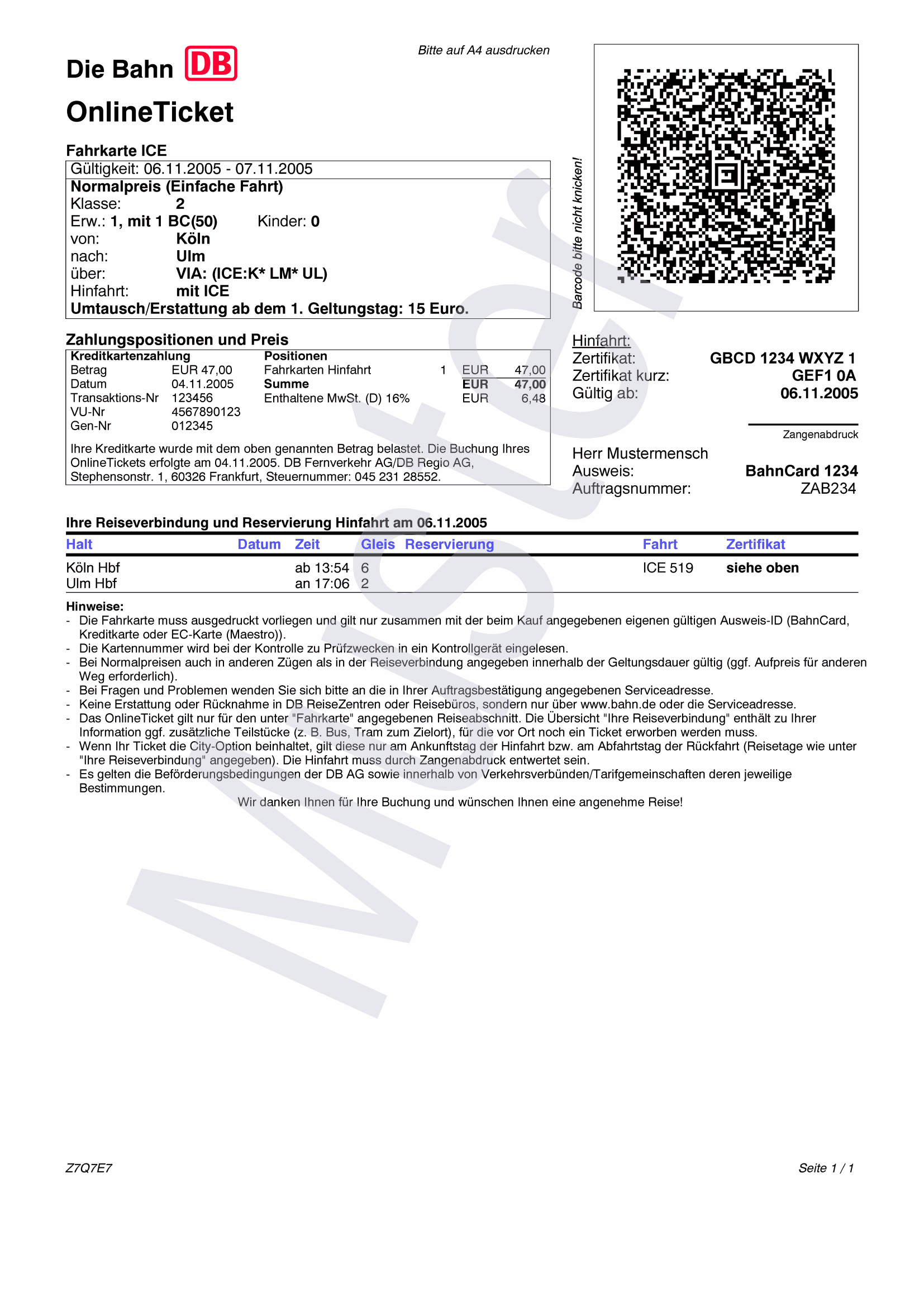
An online purchased train ticket issued by Deutsche Bahn in Germany.

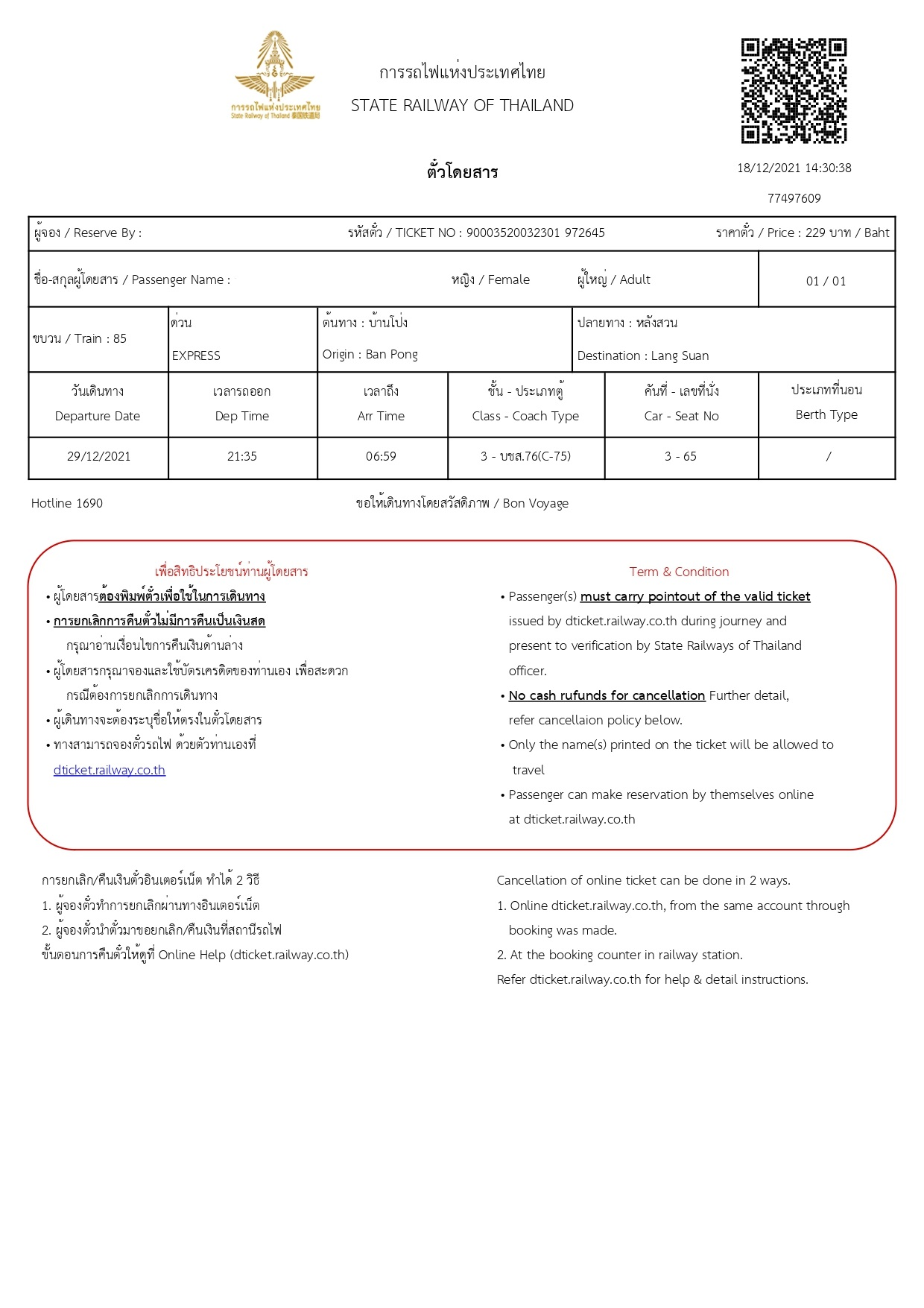
An online purchased train ticket issued by State Railway of Thailand.

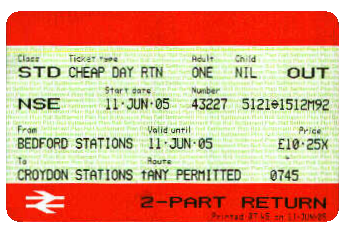
A return ticket issued in United Kingdom.

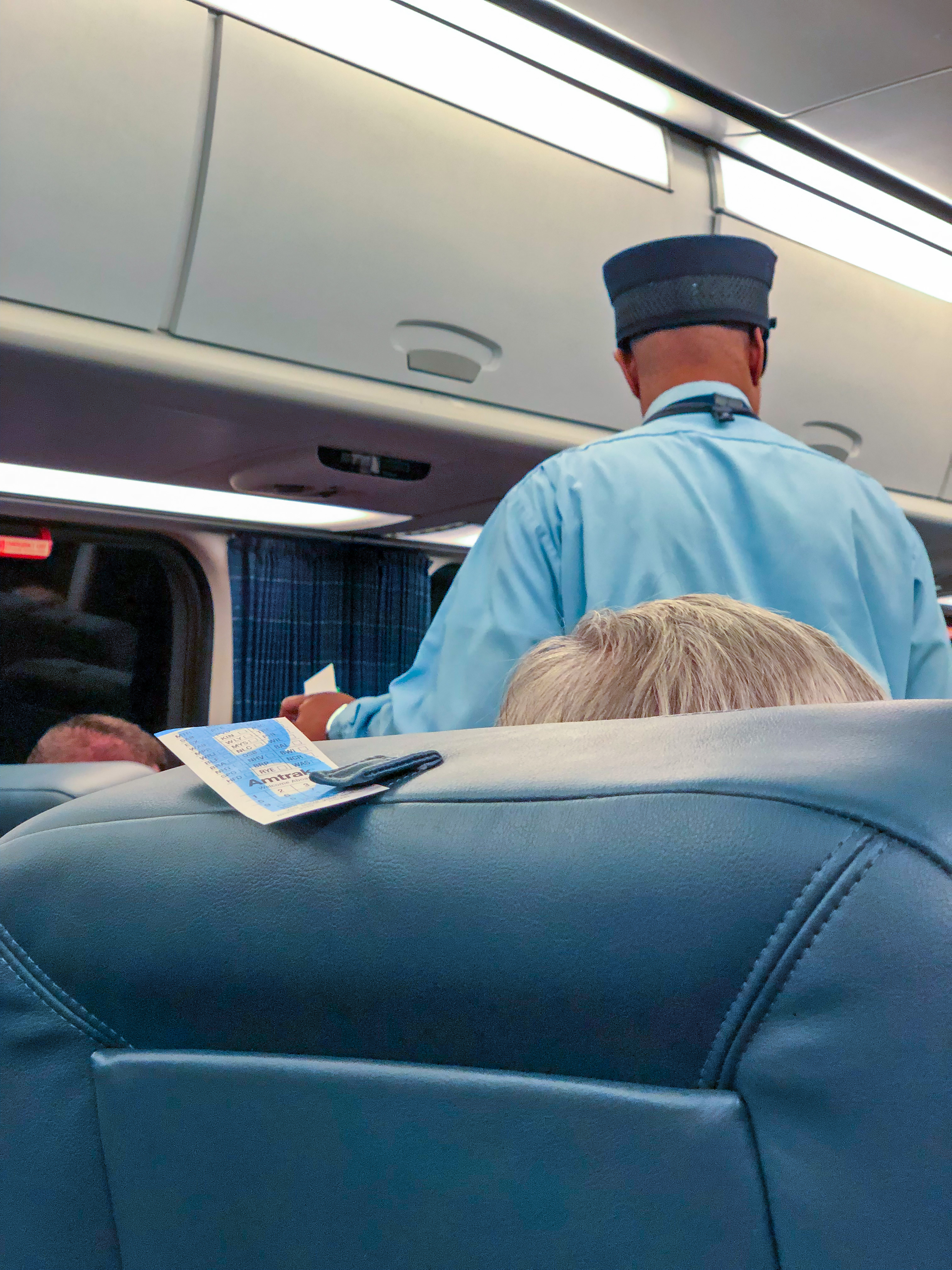
Seat check on an Acela Express train.

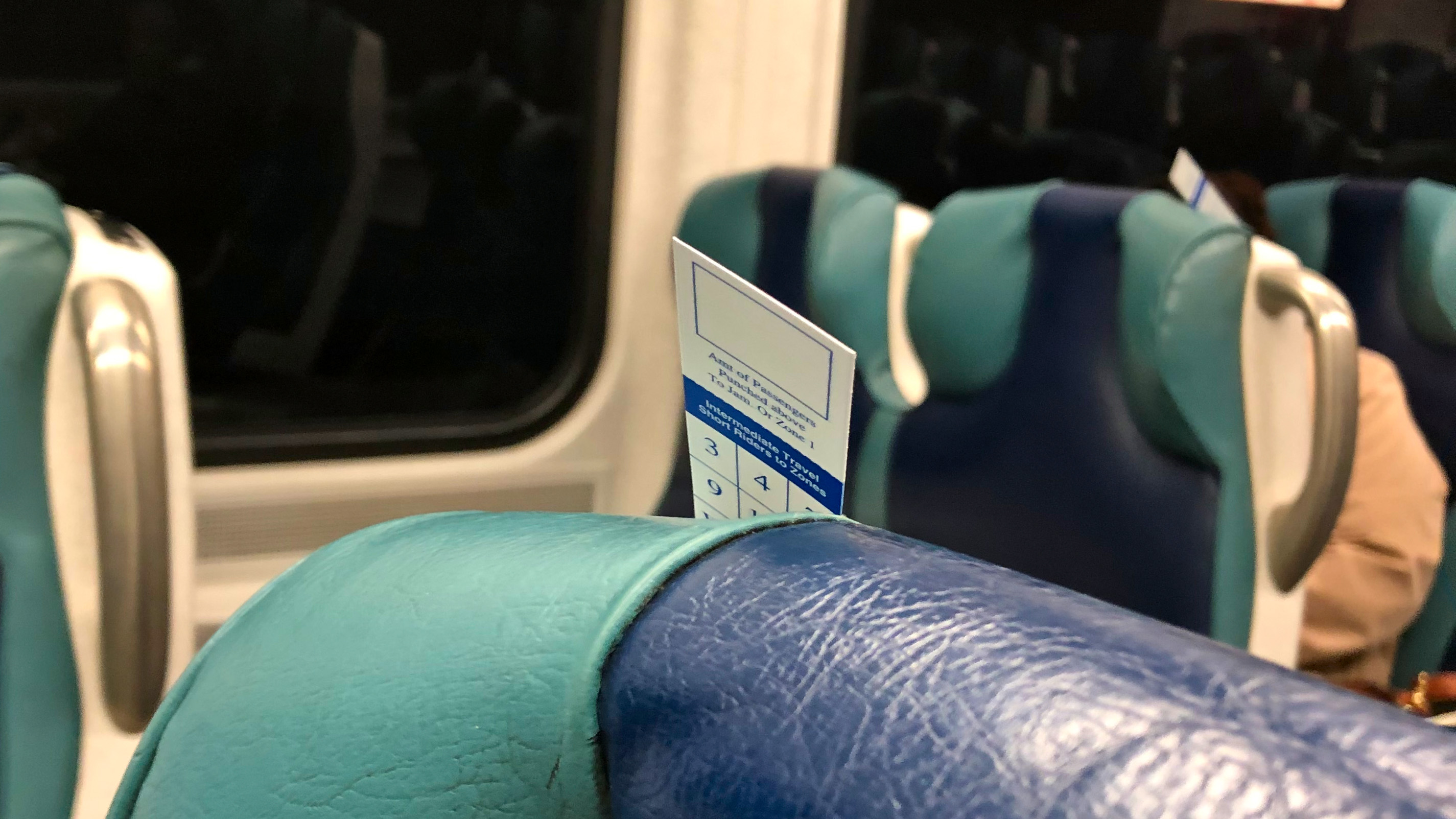
Seat check on back of seat of the Long Island Rail Road.

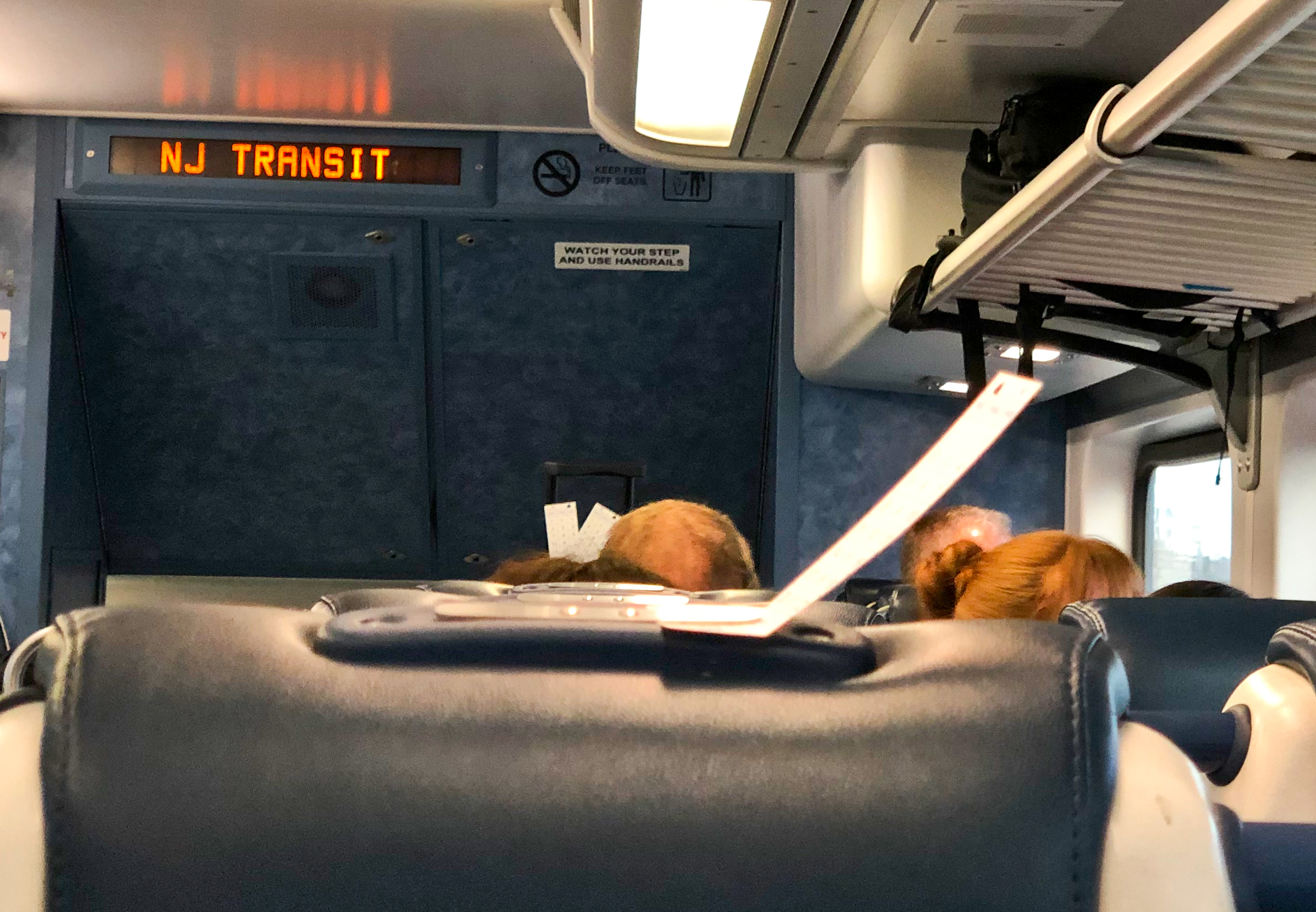
Seat check on headrest of an NJ Transit Bombardier MultiLevel Coach, note the special clip on the headrest for the seat check.

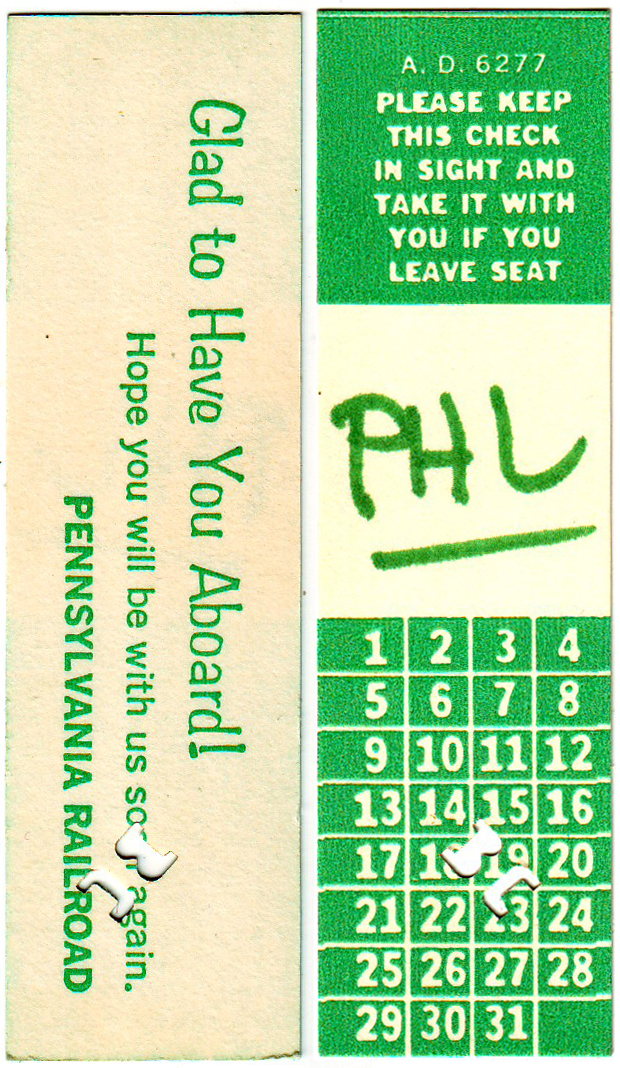
Pennsylvania Railroad passenger seat check, c. 1960

== See also ==
- CIV (rail travel), European train rules
- Edmondson railway ticket, format of printed ticket
- National Rail Conditions of Travel, UK
- Rail pass
- Reservation against Cancellation, India
