= Travelright =

Compensation claiming bureau for airlines

TRS Travelright Services
- Industry: Consumer rights
- Founded: June 2013
- Founder: Stefan Ernryd, Henric Schröder
- Headquarters: Stockholm
- Area served: EU
- Number of employees: 15
- Website: TRS Travelright

TRS Travelright Services AB is a Swedish consumer rights bureau specialized in assisting air passengers claiming compensation from airlines when their flight has been delayed, cancelled or overbooked. According to EU-law Regulation 261/2004 all passengers traveling to and from Europe are entitled to get a compensation between €250 - €600 depending on the duration of the delay and flight distance. These laws have been in effect since 2004, but only a few passengers are aware about their rights. For obvious reasons the air carriers don't spend much effort to inform their customers about their right to be compensated although the air companies are obliged to do so. But the information is to be found on EU's homepage, where the law and its implications are displayed and explained.

The number of passengers seeking help from Travelright has risen sharply during 2014 due to the technical problems with the Boeing 787 Dreamliner used by the Norwegian carrier Norwegian Air Shuttle. Although Norwegian uses Boeing's Gold Care maintenance agreement, the spare parts are stored in the USA and are being sent to Europe when technical problems occur, thus causing lengthy delays. But although most passengers are entitled to compensation, their claims are usually declined by Norwegian - even after the claims have been tried in the Norwegian authority for consumer rights Forbrukerrådet.

As most carriers make it difficult or almost impossible for laymen to carry out claims visavi multinational air companies, Travelright as a consumer rights bureau has learned that the only way to deal with these claims is to take them to court. As the big companies have enormous juridical means to fight such claims, Travelright has contracted the Swedish lawyer Stephan Eriksson to handle their cases. Stephan Eriksson is specialized in aviation law and during 2014 one principle case about the Dreamliner Experience is being handled by Stephan Eriksson in Attunda tingsrätt. The verdict will decide whether passengers are entitled to compensation after their Dreamliner flight has been exchanged for another, older plane.

In Sweden, the consumer law makes it possible to claim compensation for delayed flights as far back as ten years. Travelright, which is operating all over Europe, has an application on their homepage where passengers can try if their delayed flight is eligible for compensation or not. Then they can decide whether they want to pursue the claim themselves or use Travelright's service to do so. When Travelright is doing the legal work, the company keeps 30% of the compensation for each case that´s being won. If a case is lost, the service by Travelright is free of charge.

The intention with the EU-law Regulation 261/2004 is to reduce the number of delayed flights and to improve customer care. According to CEO Henric Schöder the aim for TRS Travelright is to inform about current laws and pursue the consumer rights of the European passengers when the air companies fail to abide the law. He also states that the software developed by Travelright that's processing all flights and weather data concerning Europe is now so advanced that the cases being brought to court will most likely succeed in almost all cases.
