= Refund.me =

- Company type: Gesellschaft mit beschränkter Haftung
- Industry: Airline, legal, flight cancellation and delay
- Founded: July 2012
- Founder: Eve Büchner
- Headquarters: Potsdam, Germany
- Area served: Worldwide
- Website: www.refund.me

Refund.me, stylized as refund.me is a technology-driven company that provides legal services for air passengers whose flight has been cancelled, significantly delayed or overbooked and for missed connections. It does so according to the stipulations of European passenger rights legislation, specifically EU Regulation 261/2004. Refund.me operates on a no-win, no-fee contingency fee.

== History ==
Refund.me was founded in 2012 by Eve Büchner, a former journalist, host, and contributor on the German news channel N24. She continues to act as CEO to date. The company has a stated goal of making passenger rights according to EC 261/2004 more transparent and attainable.

Refund.me has a team of over 40 people, including development, claims processing, legal, communications, and customer relations. It is privately owned.

In its first nine months, Refund.me processed claims from 122 airlines for passengers in more than 50 countries spanning five continents. Refund.me is also reported to have processed claims from 419 airports. According to the Refund.me website, it has cases from more than 110 countries and against more than 250 airlines. Service was introduced in English and German in July 2012, rolling out a free iOS and Android app. Since then, the company has added French, Spanish, Polish, and Portuguese to its website, app, and services.

== Service ==
Refund.me offers a widget on its website where users can submit their claim. The service is available on Refund.me’s mobile apps for iOS and Android.

Refund.me operates according to a 25% contingent fee, marketed as “no win, no fee”. It has recorded a success rate of 93.71%. According to its website, Refund.me also offers B2B partnerships by lending out its widget to partners or affiliates. Refund.me claims its Advanced Business Logic technology, which it has developed itself, considers current legislation and court rulings to quickly assess a claim’s eligibility. Passengers can consult the company’s website or its mobile app to submit their claims.

== Legal Basis ==
Refund.me is not a law firm but is legally permitted to negotiate with airlines on behalf of customers that have signed a Power of Attorney in their favor. Though Refund.me is not a law firm, it collaborates with several law firms across Europe. According to European Regulation 261/2004, passengers are eligible for compensation payments of €250 to €600 depending on the length of the delay on arrival and the distance traveled.

== Awards ==
In May 2013, Refund.me was awarded the Sabre Red Appy Award by the Sabre Travel Network in recognition of its business model and its app that makes it easier for agents and travelers to claim compensation from airlines. In October 2013, Refund.me was named Startup 2013 at the Appsters Awards in London. This prize was awarded based on the jury’s vote and a popular vote by the audience. Additionally, Refund.me was named finalist in the Best Consumer App Category.

Refund.me was commended by the 2014 FT Innovative Lawyers Report in the Legal Industry Pioneers category.

== See also ==
- AirHelp
- Flight cancellation and delay
