= Agreement on Journey Continuation =

Rail transport agreement to allow passengers on the next train in case of disruption

The Agreement on Journey Continuation (AJC) is a commercial agreement between 17 major European rail operators to allow international train passengers on the next possible train without additional costs, in case of a missed train connection.

== Background ==
Before the AJC, there were already other protections for rail passengers who miss a connecting train and lose their seat reservation due to a delay of the first train. These passengers are allowed on the next possible train without additional costs under certain conditions:

- the protection of the CIV (International Convention for the transportation of Passengers) when travelling with a single ticket (through ticket). However in the 21st century for a lot of international train journeys there are no through tickets available, and the passenger has no other choice than to buy separate tickets.
- the HOTNAT (hop on the next available train) protection of the Railteam alliance. when travelling with two separate train tickets. However this protection is valid:
  - only between two high speed trains of the 8 participating European operators
  - only in specific railway stations (including Brussels-South, Lille Europe, Frankfurt Hbf, Cologne Hbf and the transfer between the major Paris stations)

Since 2017, the AJC provides a further protection when the above protections are not valid. The AJC protection is similar to the protection of CIV, but covers separate tickets instead of a single ticket (through ticket).

Traditionally, international trains journey could be booked all the way on one booking, then the contract obliged the ticket issuer to rebook passenger who missed a connection. But train operators have to a higher degree avoided selling such tickets, recommending passengers to buy separate tickets from each operator.

== Conditions ==
The passenger who, due to a delay or cancellation of the preceding train, misses a train on which he has a seat reservation, is allowed on the next possible train without additional costs under these conditions:

- It is an international train journey.
- The operators of the connecting trains have both signed the agreement.
- The passenger must have foreseen a reasonable connecting time between the trains (minimal the proposed time of the official journey planners)
- The passenger must present a confirmation of this delay, that he received from the delayed operator.
- Onward travel has to be on the same operator and the same route as on the ticket
- The AJC is not an automatic passenger right. At the interchange station, the passenger should ask permission from the station staff or from the train manager of the onward train.
- The agreement does not cover assistance or compensation due to the delay or cancellation. Each operator is, however, obliged to pay certain compensation for trains delayed over one hour based on EU rules.

== Participating rail operators ==
The agreement is developed by the International Rail Transport Committee (CIT).

Af of April 2025, the signatories are:

- BLS (Switzerland)
- ČD (Czechia)
- CFL (Luxembourg)
- Deutsche Bahn (Germany)
- DSB (Denmark)
- Eurostar International Limited (UK, Belgium, France, the Netherlands)
- GYSEV-Raaberbahn (Hungary)
- HŽPP (Croatia)
- LTG Link (Lithuania)
- MAV-START (Hungary)
- NMBS/SNCB (Belgium)
- NS (the Netherlands)
- ÖBB (Austria)
- PKP Intercity (Poland)
- Renfe (Spain)
- SBB/CFF/FFS (Switzerland)
- SJ (Sweden)
- Snälltåget (Sweden)
- SNCF Voyageurs (France)
- SŽ (Slovenia)
- THI Factory (France, Belgium, Germany, the Netherlands)
- Trenitalia (Italy)
- ŽSSK (Slovakia)

The agreement is open to new signatories.

As of 2022, all signatories were European national rail operators. Some open-access operators have signed after that.
