= Huzar v Jet2.com =

- Court: Court of Appeal
- Full case name: Ronald Huzar v Jet2.com Limited
- Decided: 11 June 2014
- Citation: [2014] EWCA Civ 791

Court membership
- Judges sitting: Laws LJ; Elias LJ; Gloster LJ

Huzar v Jet2.com [2014] EWCA Civ 791 was a landmark case, taken to the Court of Appeal in May 2014, which created binding case law for all future flight delay compensation claims in England and Wales.

== Facts ==
The case specifically related to a Jet2.com flight, number 810, which was scheduled to depart at 18:25 on 26 October 2011 from Malaga to Manchester. The flight was subject to a 27-hour delay.

On the inbound flight to Malaga the aircraft's left engine fuel advisory light became illuminated, indicating a possible defect in the fuel shut-off valve. On landing, Jet2.com arranged for a spare valve to be fitted but the problem remained. It was not possible for the problem to be resolved before the airport shut for the evening. The following day engineers discovered a wiring defect in the fuel valve circuit which required repairing. As a result Jet2.com sent a specialist engineer and spare wiring from its hangar at Leeds Bradford airport. In the meantime Jet2.com decided to bring another aircraft from Glasgow to take passengers from Malaga to Manchester.

Mr Huzar acted as litigant in person, issuing proceedings for compensation on behalf of himself, his wife and their granddaughter of €400 each, under European Union (EU) Regulation 261/2004. Mr Huzar had initially referred his complaint to AESA, the Spanish National Enforcement Body, which ruled that his flight was claimable; however Jet2.com still refused compensation.

== History of the case ==
On 20 December 2012 Mr Huzar commenced proceedings himself via the County Court Business Centre. Jet2.com instructed a firm of solicitors to act on its behalf and filed a defence citing extraordinary circumstances, specifically a left engine fuel valve problem which came to light during the previous flight. After troubleshooting it became apparent this was a wiring defect.

On 10 June 2013 the matter was listed for a small claims hearing at Stockport County Court before Deputy District Judge Dignan. Mr Huzar acted as a litigant in person with Jet2.com represented by commercial law barristers.

As part of his judgment Deputy Dignan commented :"I accept it could be argued that a fault with the engine wiring is not an event which is not inherent in the normal exercise of the air carrier's activities because the engine is part and parcel of the aeroplane, but the crux is, it goes on to say, "and are beyond its actual control".

"A gloss has been put on that by the case presented by Miss McCrea (sic) in her skeleton argument, Wallentin-Hermann v Alitalia, and clearly that case has provided a basis for being able to argue that if there is a defect which could not have been revealed during ordinary flight maintenance and of itself is so exceptional that it could not have been detected in advance through maintenance and examination, and I am prepared to find that that sort of fault is beyond the control of the carrier, and therefore the exception to the regulations does apply in this case."

Deputy Dignan found in favour for Jet2.com and dismissed the claim. Mr Huzar then approached a firm of solicitors in the immediate aftermath of the hearing, which agreed to appeal on his behalf.

On 27 June 2013 the appeal was filed at court on the grounds there had been a mistake as to the Application of the Law and undue prejudice to the claimant. The application relied on the case of Friederike Wallentin-Hermann v Alitalia-Linee Aeree Italiane SpA. Mr Huzar argued that this was a two part test – that Jet2.com must show the defect was not inherent and that the defect was beyond its actual control. If one part of the test failed, compensation must be awarded.

On 14 August 2013, permission to appeal was granted and the matter was listed for hearing before Judge Platts at Manchester County Court on 8 October 2013, with a time estimate of one day. This time both sides were represented by barristers.

Jet2.com argued that in effect the test in Wallentin is actually one test, and that the court can effectively ask 'was the event beyond the control of the air carrier?'.

The Defendant also argued that events found outside of maintenance were extraordinary and that these events were unforeseen, unexpected and unpredictable. Mr Huzar argued that a technical problem as this, caused by wear and tear, is an event which is inherent in the normal running of an airline and whether it is unexpected is inutile. Furthermore, he argued the wear and tear affecting the aircraft is firmly within the air carrier's actual control. In the absence of any external cause the technical problem must not be extraordinary.

In paragraphs 27 and 28 of his judgment Judge Platts found:

"Against that background I am persuaded that in this case the cause of delay or cancellation was the need to resolve the technical problem which had been identified. That being the case, in my judgment it does not matter how the technical problem was identified. Whether it was identified by routine maintenance (as was the case in Wallentin) or as a result of a warning light during flight (as in the present case) seems to me to be irrelevant. Equally and for that very reason the fact that it was unexpected and unforeseeable is also irrelevant. The reality is that once a technical problem is identified it is inherent in the normal activity of the air carrier to have to resolve that technical problem. Further, the resolution of the problem, as was demonstrated in this case, is entirely within the control of the carrier.

"On such an analysis the delay caused by the resolution of an unexpected, unforeseen and unforeseeable technical problem cannot be said to be an extraordinary circumstance given the Wallentin test. Air carriers have to encounter and deal with such circumstances as part of running an airline just as the owner of a car has to encounter and deal with unexpected and unforeseen breakdowns of his car."

The appeal was successful and judgment was entered for Mr Huzar.

Jet2.com applied for leave to appeal to the Court of Appeal on 11 November 2013. The application was made on the grounds that Judge Platts had erred in law on the grounds he had found the resolution of a technical defect to be inherent and in suggesting it was irrelevant how the problem was identified. The airline submitted that if a technical defect was found as a result of sabotage, terrorism or a manufacturing defect then it was an extraordinary circumstance as set out within the preamble to the Regulations.

On 31 January 2014, Lewison LJ granted leave to appeal, stating 'The grounds of appeal raise an important point of principle which, as the judge said "does not admit to an easy answer".'

The matter was listed at Court 68 of the Royal Courts of Justice on 22 May 2014. Each party was represented by a Queen's Counsel (QC) before Lord Justice Law, Lord Justice Elias and Lady Justice Gloster.

== Outcome ==
At the end of the hearing on 22 May 2014 at the Royal Courts of Justice, the judges Law LJ, Elias LJ, and Gloster LJ reserved their judgment. The judgment on 11 June 2014 was found in favour of Mr Huzar.

Jet2.com requested to appeal against the ruling but the Supreme Court refused its application to do so stating that:

"[...]the application does not raise a point of law of general public importance and, in relation to the point of European Union law said to be raised by or in response to the application, it is not necessary to request the Court of Justice to give any ruling, because the Court's existing jurisprudence already provides sufficient answer."

== Significance ==
On 13 June 2014, the Civil Aviation Authority (CAA) issued an apology to passengers who had previously sought its advice on flight delay or cancellation compensation. The authority confirmed that in the future, all claims should be assessed in light of the Huzar v Jet2 ruling, adding:

"Claims previously put to an airline can be reconsidered in the light of the judgement, if the passenger wishes, unless the passenger agreed a settlement with the airline."

Because of the landmark ruling, airlines are no longer able to claim that flight disruption caused by ordinary technical problems (such as wear and tear) are part of the extraordinary circumstances outlined in EU Regulation 261/2004.

Figures from the CAA show that on average 221.1 million terminal passengers per year use British airports. According to statistics released by the European Commission an average of 1.5 percent of flights to/from British airports each year are delayed or cancelled by more than three hours and so could potentially be claimable.

This is equivalent to approximately 3.27 million passengers per year for each of the previous six years, which is the period covered by the regulation in England and Wales (total 19.6 million passengers).

According to the final European Commission report 'Evaluation of Regulation 261/2004', an estimated 80 percent of EC261 claims are due to technical defects and so stand to be affected by this case. This means approximately 2.6 million passengers per year for each of the past six years (total 17.6 million passengers) could stand to be affected by the outcome of the Huzar case.
