= Flight cancellation and delay =

Concept in aviation

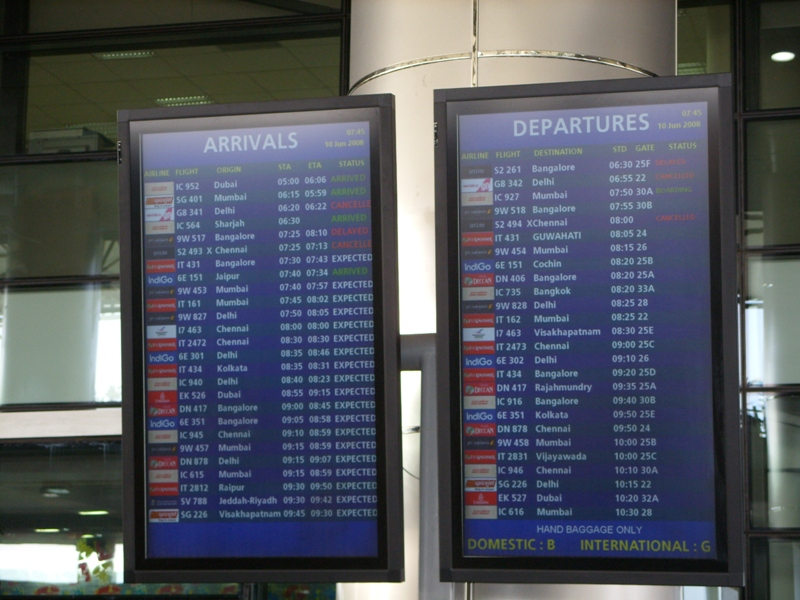
A flight information display system showing canceled and delayed flights at Rajiv Gandhi International Airport in 2008.

A flight delay occurs when an airline flight takes off and/or lands later than its scheduled time. The United States Federal Aviation Administration (FAA) considers a flight to be delayed when it is 15 minutes later than its scheduled time. A flight cancellation occurs when the airline does not operate the flight at all for a certain reason.

== Legislation ==
=== European Union ===
In the European Union, Flight Compensation Regulation 261/2004 states that flight delays for over three hours, cancellations and denied boarding entitles passengers to a compensation from €250 up to €600 per passenger from the airline.

=== United States ===
In the United States, when flights are canceled or delayed, passengers may be entitled to compensation due to rules obeyed by every flight company, usually Rule 240, or Rule 218 in certain locations. This rule usually specifies that passengers may be entitled to certain reimbursements, including a free room if the next flight is the day after the canceled one, a choice of reimbursement, rerouting, phone calls, and refreshments. When a flight is delayed, the FAA allocates slots for takeoffs and landings based on which flight is scheduled first. The US Department of Transportation imposes a fine of up to US$27,500 per passenger for planes left on the tarmac for more than three hours without taking off or four hours for international flights. However, passengers are not entitled to direct monetary compensation under US law when a delay occurs. Instead, airlines are merely required to pay for lodging costs of passengers if the delay or a cancellation is through their own fault, but not if the cause is beyond their control, such as weather.

=== Brazil ===
Under Brazilian legislation, if a flight is delayed for over an hour, passengers are entitled to care and assistance from the airline, including communication facilities. If the delay lasts for 2 hours, passengers are entitled to food and drinks, and where the delay lasts for more than 4 hours, passengers are entitled to an alternative flight to their destination, and accommodation if the flight will be delayed overnight. If the airline fails to provide passengers with appropriate care, they can claim cash compensation up to R$10,000 per passenger.

== Causes ==
Since 2003, the United States Bureau of Transportation Statistics has been keeping track of the causes of flight delays. The number of flight delays has increased as staff has been cut back as a result of the financial woes following the September 11 attacks.

Some of the causes of flight delays or cancellation include:

- Airline glitches. The top cause of flight delays, according to a USA Today analysis.
- Congestion in air traffic
- Earthquakes and tsunamis (e.g., in the event of 2004 Indian Ocean earthquake and tsunami, 2010 Chile earthquake, and the 2011 Tōhoku earthquake and tsunami)
- Fueling
- Inclement weather, such as thunderstorm, hurricane, or blizzard
- Late arrival of the aircraft to be used for the flight from a previous flight
- Maintenance problems with the aircraft
- Security issues
- Terrorist attacks (e.g., suicide bombing in the event of Domodedovo International Airport bombing, the 2016 Brussels bombings, and the 2016 Atatürk Airport attack)

== Effects ==
=== Cost to airlines ===
In the United States, the Federal Aviation Administration estimates that flight delays cost airlines $22 billion yearly. This is largely because airlines are forced to pay federal authorities when they hold planes on the tarmac for more than three hours for domestic flights or more than four hours for international flights.

=== Cost to passengers ===
Flight delays are inconvenient for passengers as well. A delayed flight can be particularly costly to business travellers by causing them to miss scheduled appointments and interfering with other commitments. Furthermore, delayed passengers may suffer anger, frustration, and even air rage.

=== Compensation ===
Flights from the EU are universally covered by Regulation (EC) No 261/2004 regardless of where the operating carrier is headquartered. This requires airlines to pay a lump-sum compensation of up to €600 to each affected passenger if the flight is cancelled on short notice or delayed by more than three hours on arrival (four hours for long-haul flights). In effect, this means that an airline can still be required to pay passengers compensation under Regulation (EC) No 261/2004 even though it does not maintain a head or branch office in Europe. Compensation eligibility typically requires that the passenger arrives at their final destination at least three hours later than scheduled, unless extraordinary circumstances apply.

Besides, flights to the EU from other countries are also covered by said regulation if the airline carrying out the flight is based in a member state of the European Union. Therefore, a flight departing London to New York on American Airlines is subjected to the regulation, whereas the return journey on the same airline is not. On the other hand, if a flight from New York to London was operated by an EU carrier, such as Lufthansa or Air France, Regulation (EC) No 261/2004 would apply.

Following the transition period after the UK's withdrawal from the European Union, it is no longer treated as a member state under Regulation (EC) No 261/2004 but as a third country like the US. However, the European Union (Withdrawal) Act 2018 that came into force on 30 December 2020 retained EU legislation hitherto directly applicable and incorporated it into British domestic law. Likewise, the CJEU's jurisdiction on the Regulation (EC) No 261/2004 up until the end of 2020 was converted into British case law through the same statute. Consequently, passengers travelling to and from Great Britain continue to enjoy the same legal protection on their flights as before when the country was still a member of the European Union.

Only a few other states like India and Canada have implemented passenger rights that afford lump-sum compensations to travellers suffering significant flight disruptions as well. Yet, respective entitlements are generally limited to cases of severe irregularities caused by the operating airline's own negligence. Hence, such provisions afford an inferior level of protection to passengers compared to European standards.

== Flight delay data in the USA ==
These graphs represent the average flight delay per month and per day of the USA's 10 biggest airports, namely; Atlanta, Chicago, Dallas, Denver, New York (JFK), Los Angeles, San Francisco, Las Vegas, Seattle and Charlotte.

=== Yearly data analysis ===
Based on flight delay data from 2015 some correlations can be shown. The analysis focuses on America's ten biggest airports, those are; Atlanta, Chicago, Dallas, Denver, New York (JFK), Los Angeles, San Francisco, Las Vegas, Seattle and Charlotte. Data analysis confirms that the distribution of delays at departure is very similar to that at arrival and there is a strong correlation between the two data. Observed is namely the average time of delay per month and the tendency of delays depending on the days of the week. It is clearly noticed that the average delay of a flight was larger in February, June, July and December. This seems to be strongly correlated with holiday periods. As can be expected September has a rather low average delay. One can derive that the probability of encountering a flight delay is larger in the above-mentioned months. Also, the busiest days to be flying are mainly Mondays, Sundays and Thursdays. Fridays are also a popular day to be flying.

=== Causes of delay ===
This graph provides information about the amount of flight delays caused by certain factors.

There are several causes for a flight to be delayed. It is interesting to look at the proportions or chances of encountering certain delay type. More than half of the fights tend to be late (this taking account minor delays such as 5 or 10 min delays). Most planes are late due to air system issues or airline delays. This is interesting because it means that it is an area of the airline industry that could be optimized. Supporting our argument, one notices that the lower amount of delays are caused due to weather and security issues. Showing us that security, for example, is optimized to a very large level and other types of delays could eventually be avoided by optimizing organization in airports or establishing a delay prevention schedule. Weather delays are rather rare and are not primary reasons for flights to be delayed.

=== Performances ===
These graphs describe the amount of delay type; large, medium or small, based on certain factors such as the airline, the departure airline, wind speed and holidays.

This section illustrates performances of Airlines and Airports in being on time in 2015, the focus is on the USA's ten biggest airports, namely; Atlanta, Chicago, Dallas, Denver, New York (JFK), Los Angeles, San Francisco, Las Vegas, Seattle and Charlotte. Delays are divided into three categories, namely "on time or small delay" (up to 15 minutes delay), "Medium delay" (15 – 45 minutes delay) and "Large delay" ( 45 minutes delay). In this way the graphic representation is more understandable as well as the possibility of directly comparing the variables related with delays. As represented one can observe that Airlines that were particularly good at being on time compared to other airlines were Delta Air Lines, American Airlines and Alaska Airlines. Those that tend to have a larger delay are Spirit Airlines, American Southeast Airlines and Frontier Airlines. Even if some observations can be made one cannot say that one airline is better than another. The same type of analysis can be one for different airports. In this case one can observe that airports such as New York and Atlanta stand out positively, while the one with the worst frequency of delays is Chicago. However, the differences are less obvious and, generally speaking, one can conclude that airlines play a more significant role than the airports of departure. Finally, the weather variables (humidity, wind speed) and holidays are analysed. After observing that the correlation between humidity and delays is almost zero, one could notice that both the wind speed and the holidays instead have a certain impact on flight delays.

== See also ==
- FlyersRights.org
- Refund.me
- 2022 Southwest Airlines scheduling crisis
