= Flight information display system =

Computer system used in airports to display flight information

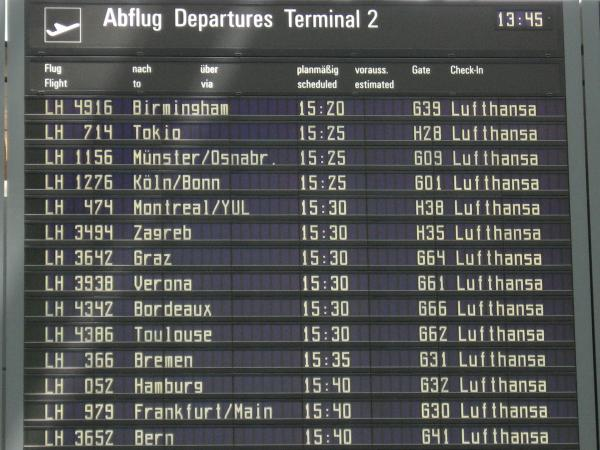
Flight information display LCD board at Munich Airport

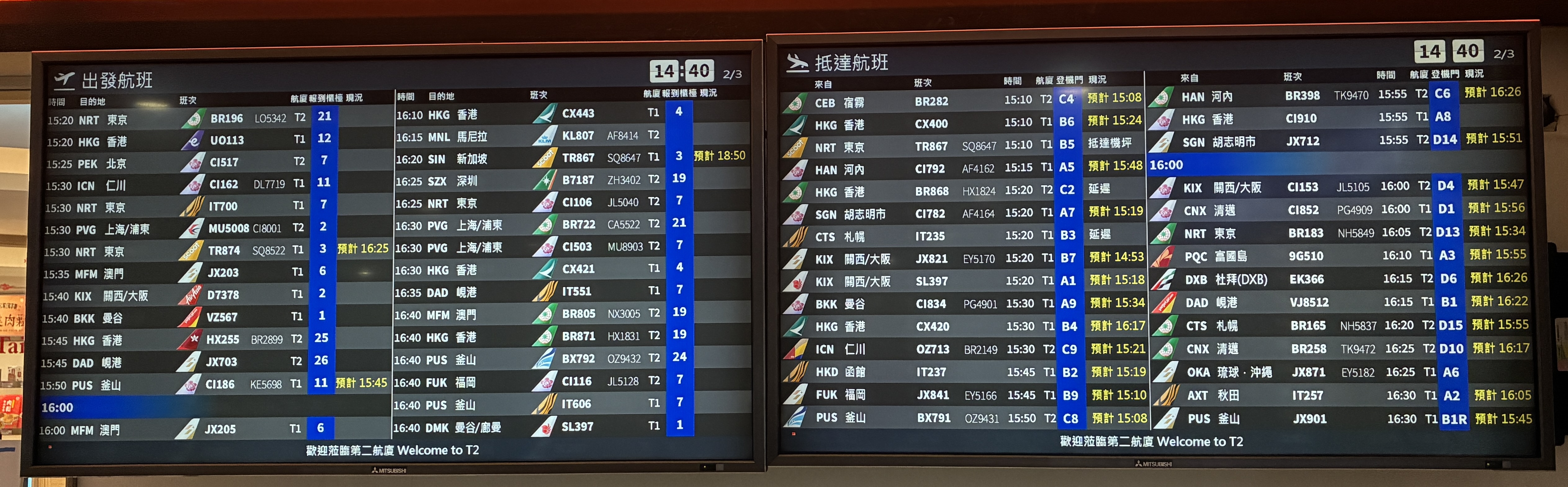
Taiwan's Taoyuan International Airport Flight information display system

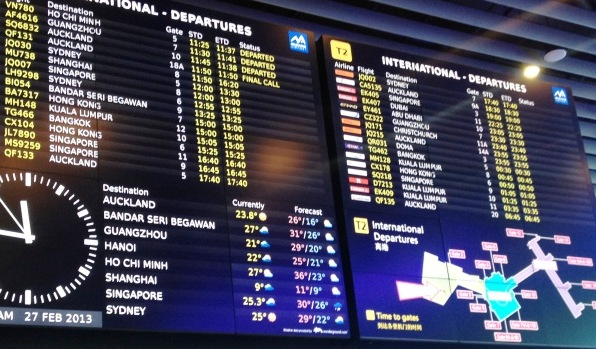
Modern FIDS display utilising multiple monitors at Melbourne Airport

A flight information display system (FIDS) is a computer system used in airports to display flight information to passengers, in which a computer system controls mechanical or electronic display boards or monitors in order to display arriving and departing flight information in real-time. The displays are located inside or around an airport terminal. A virtual version of a FIDS can also be found on most airport websites and teletext systems. In large airports, there are different sets of FIDS for each terminal or even each major airline. FIDS are used to inform passengers of boarding gates, departure/arrival times, destinations, notifications of flight delays/flight cancellations, and partner airlines, et al.

Each line on an FIDS indicates a different flight number accompanied by:

- the airline name/logo and/or its IATA or ICAO airline designator (can also include names/logos of interlining/codesharing airlines or partner airlines, e.g. HX252/BR2898.)
- the city of origin or destination, and any intermediate points
- the expected arrival or departure time and/or the updated time (reflecting any delays)
- the status of the flight, such as "Landed", "Delayed", "Boarding", etc.

And in the case of departing flights:

- the check-in counter numbers or the name of the airline handling the check-in
- the gate number

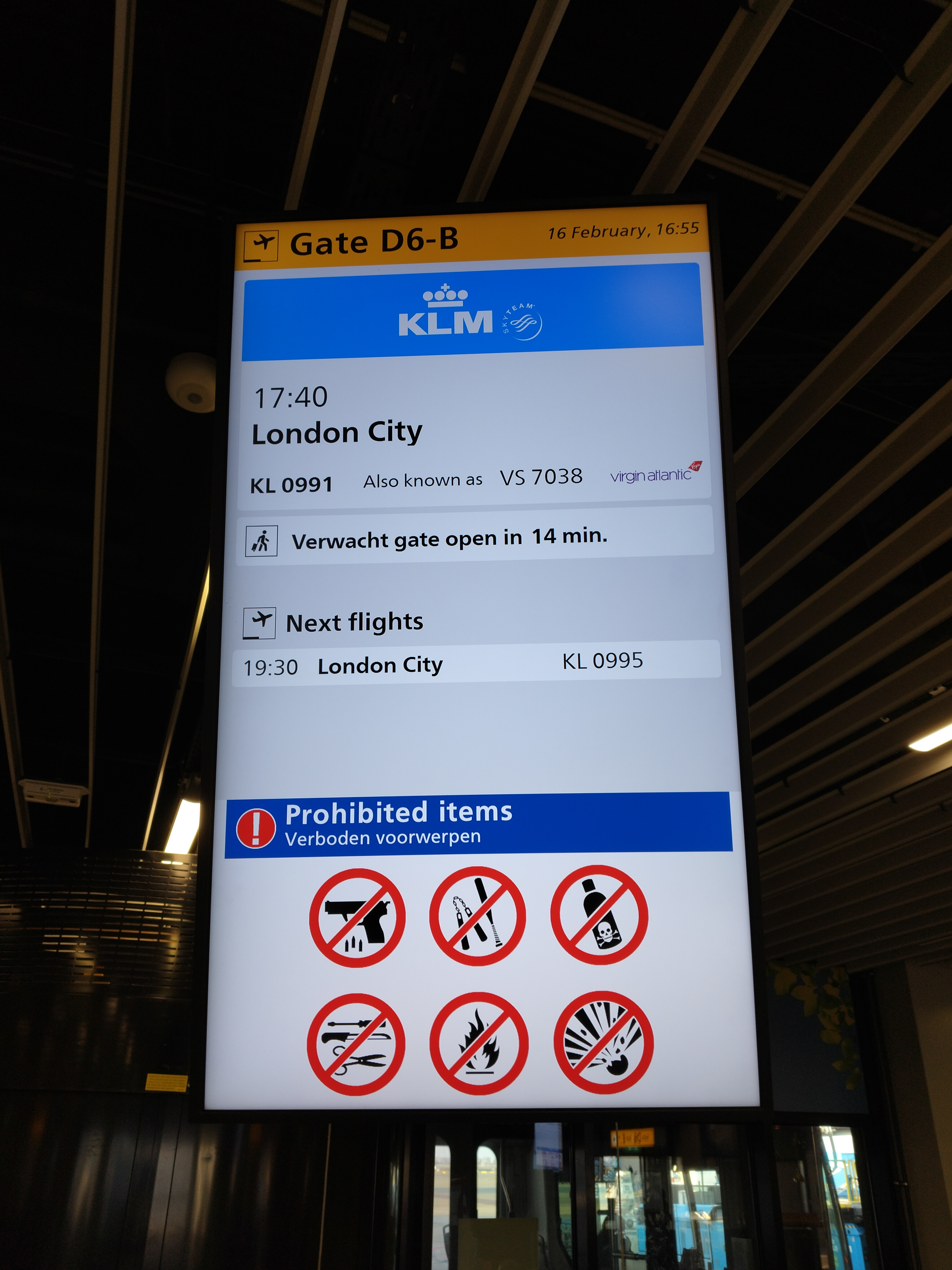
FIDS display at Schiphol, 2025

Due to code sharing, a flight may be represented by a series of different flight numbers. For example, LH 474 and AC 9099, both partners of Star Alliance, codeshare on a route using a single aircraft, either Lufthansa or Air Canada, to operate that route at that given time. Lines may be sorted by time, airline name, or city.

Most FIDS are now displayed on LCD or LED screen, although some airports still use split-flap displays.
