= Railteam =

Alliance of European high-speed rail companies

Railteam B.V.
- Formation: July 2007
- Type: High-speed rail alliance
- Headquarters: Amsterdam, Netherlands
- Location: Europe
- Members: 7 operators + 1 associate operator
- Website: www.railteam.eu

Railteam B.V. is a closed company with limited liability (B.V.) based in Amsterdam, the Netherlands. It operates as an alliance of European railway companies in the field of international high-speed rail in Europe, modelled on the airline alliances and was founded in Brussels on 2 July 2007.

Taken together, the Railteam alliance has more than 1000 high-speed trains and 44 lounges. With the members of the Railteam alliance, passengers can reach over 100 European destinations on high-speed trains.

== Members and Network ==
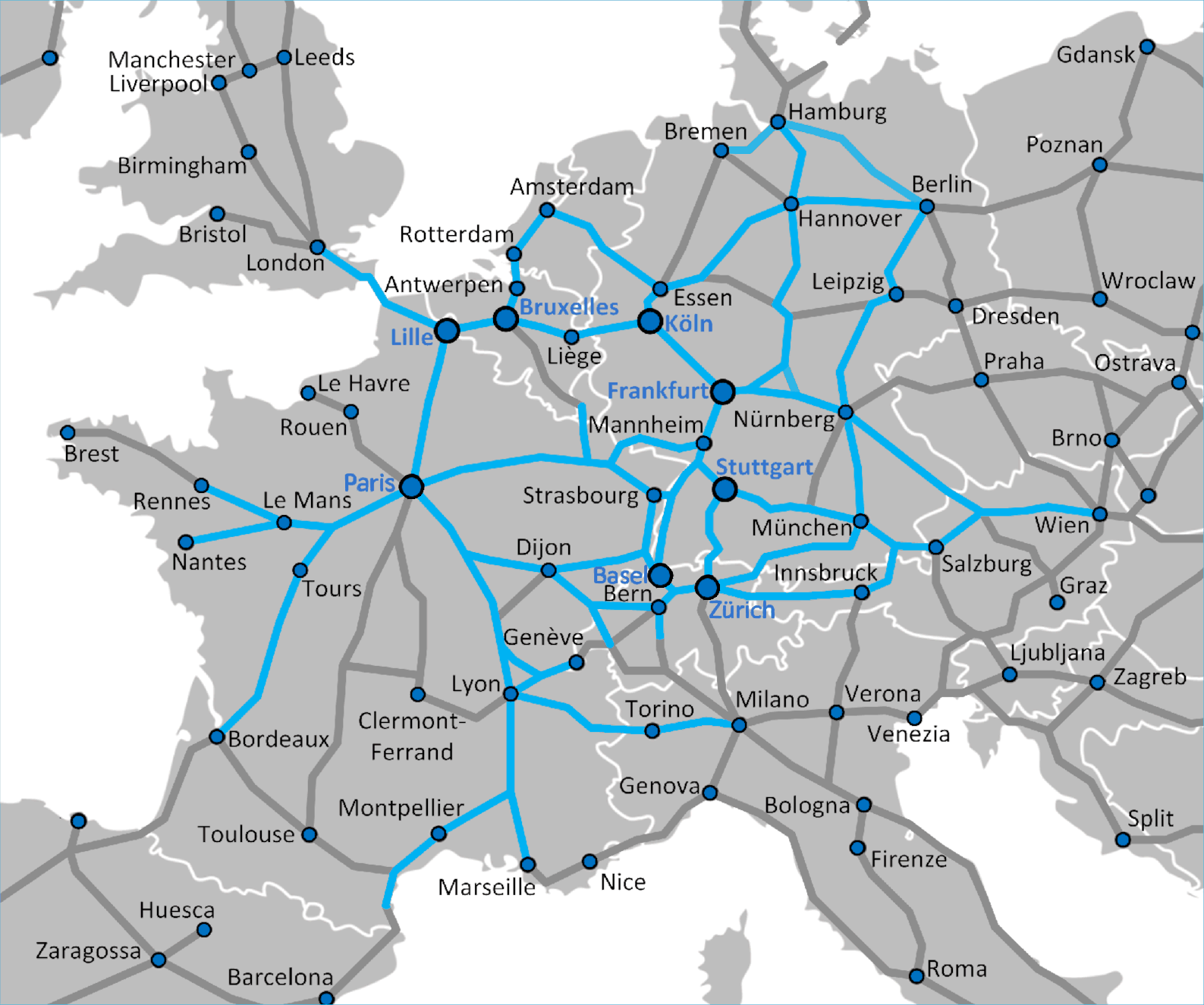
Railteam network Blue lines: Lines of the Railteam network Large dots: Main hubs of the Railteam route network

Any railway company in Europe that meets the criteria of the alliance can become a member.

There are full members of Railteam who hold shares in the company, as well as associate members. All participating railways act as strategic partners within the Railteam alliance and remain entrepreneurially independent. By this alliance, trains are seen as high-speed when they reach a minimum speed of 230 km/h: Intercity Express, TGV inOui, Eurostar, TGV Lyria, and Railjet. The transport network of the long-distance trains offered in Railteam covers about 100 cities in seven countries (Belgium, Germany, France, United Kingdom, the Netherlands, Austria and Switzerland), which are connected by a network of about 15,000 kilometres.

The full members include the following companies:

- Deutsche Bahn (DB) – 20%
- SNCF Voyageurs – 20%
- National Railway Company of Belgium (NMBS/SNCB) – 10%
- Eurostar Group – 20%
- NS International – 10%
- Austrian Federal Railways (ÖBB) – 10%
- Swiss Federal Railways (SBB-CFF-FFS) – 10%

The associate members include:

- Lyria (subsidiary of SNCF Voyageurs with 74% and SBB with 26%)

The main hubs of the route network are Brussels-South, Lille/Lille Europe, Paris, Cologne Hbf, Frankfurt Hbf, Stuttgart, Basel and Zurich.

Highspeed trains of Railteam's members
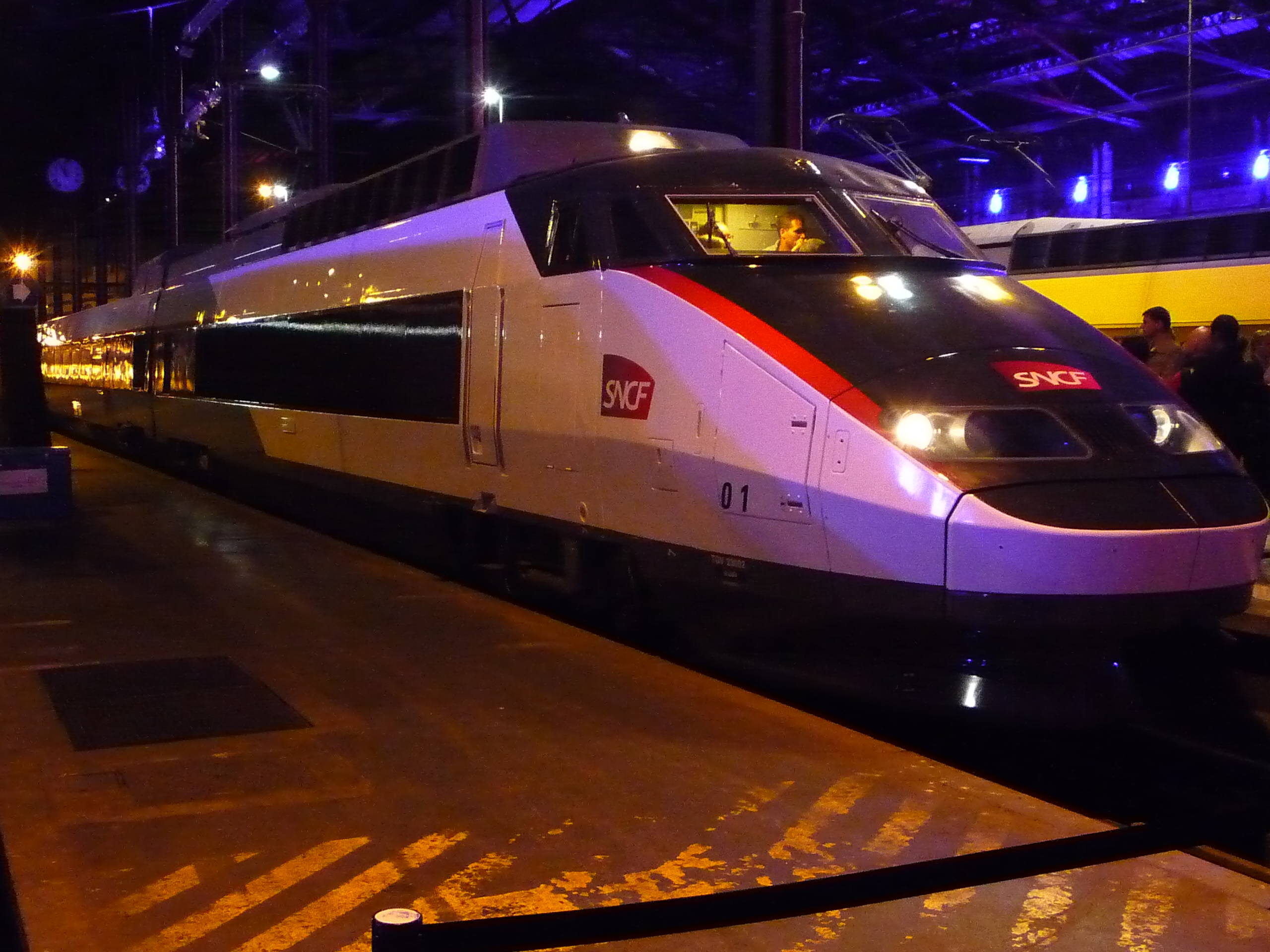
TGV

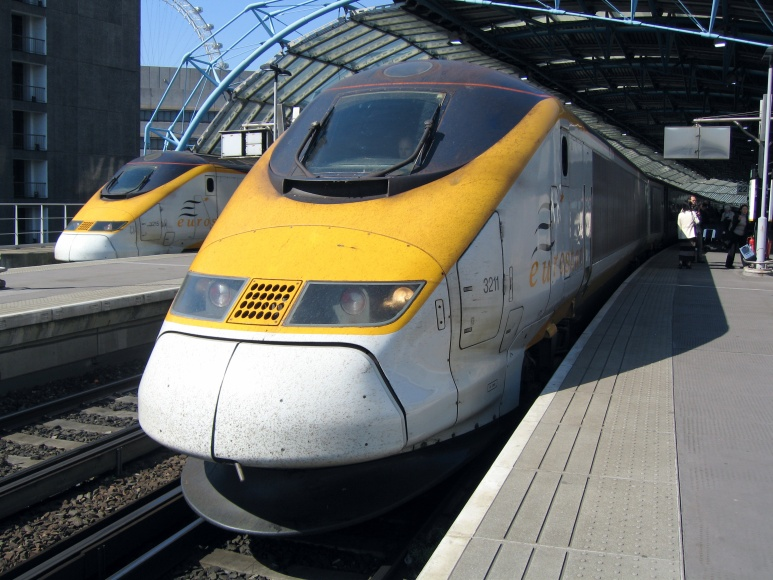
Eurostar

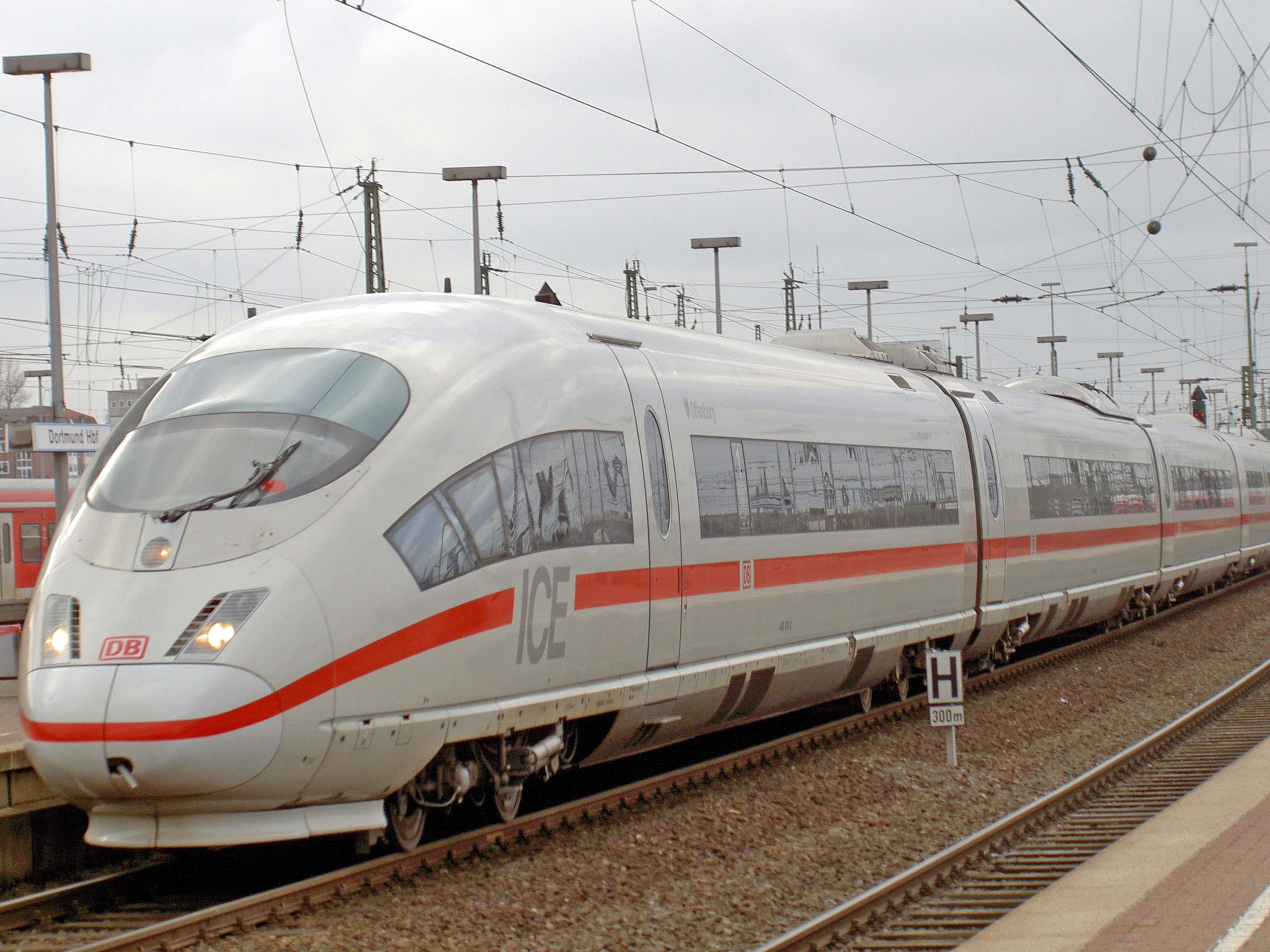
Intercity-Express (ICE)

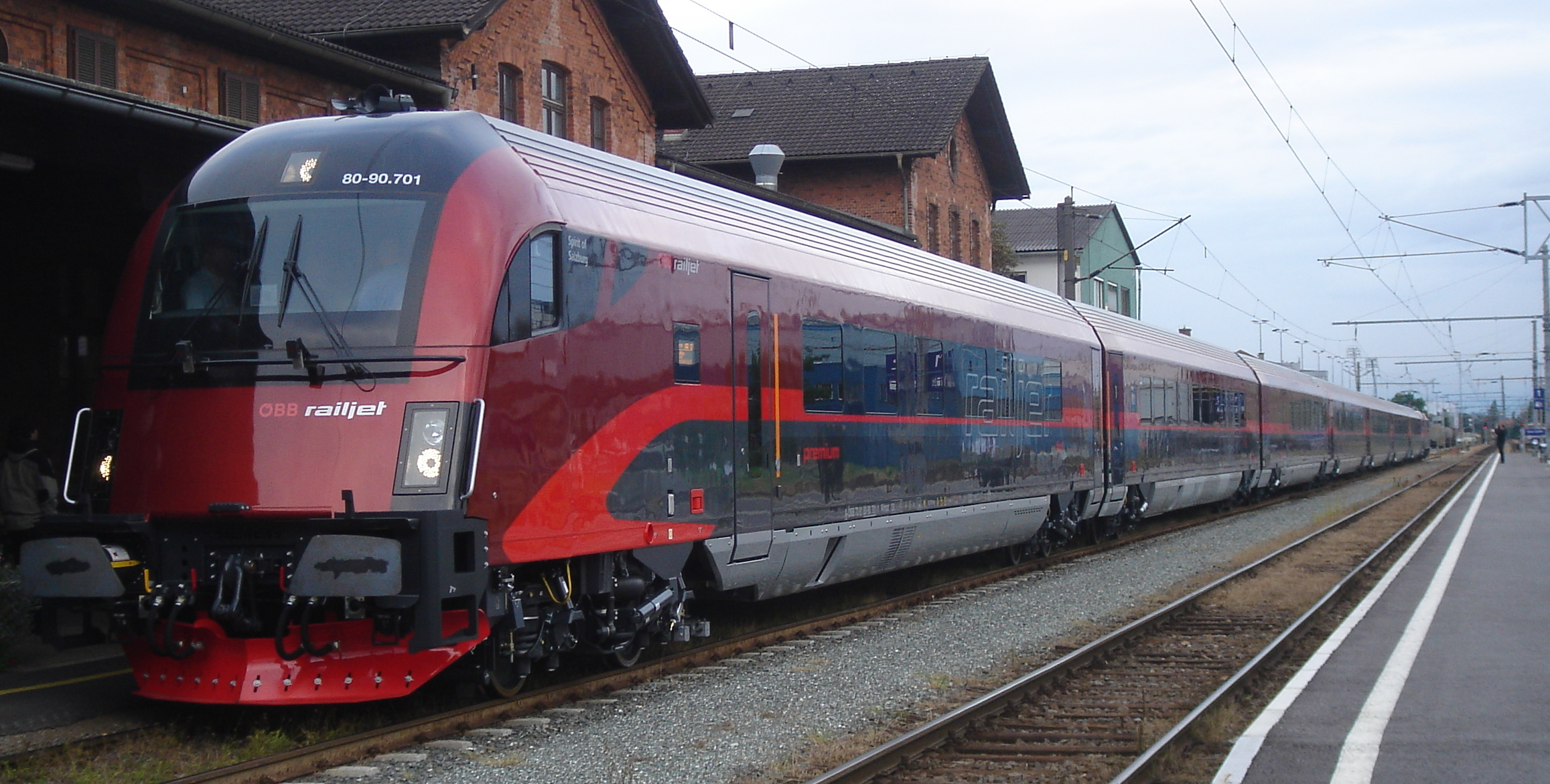
Railjet

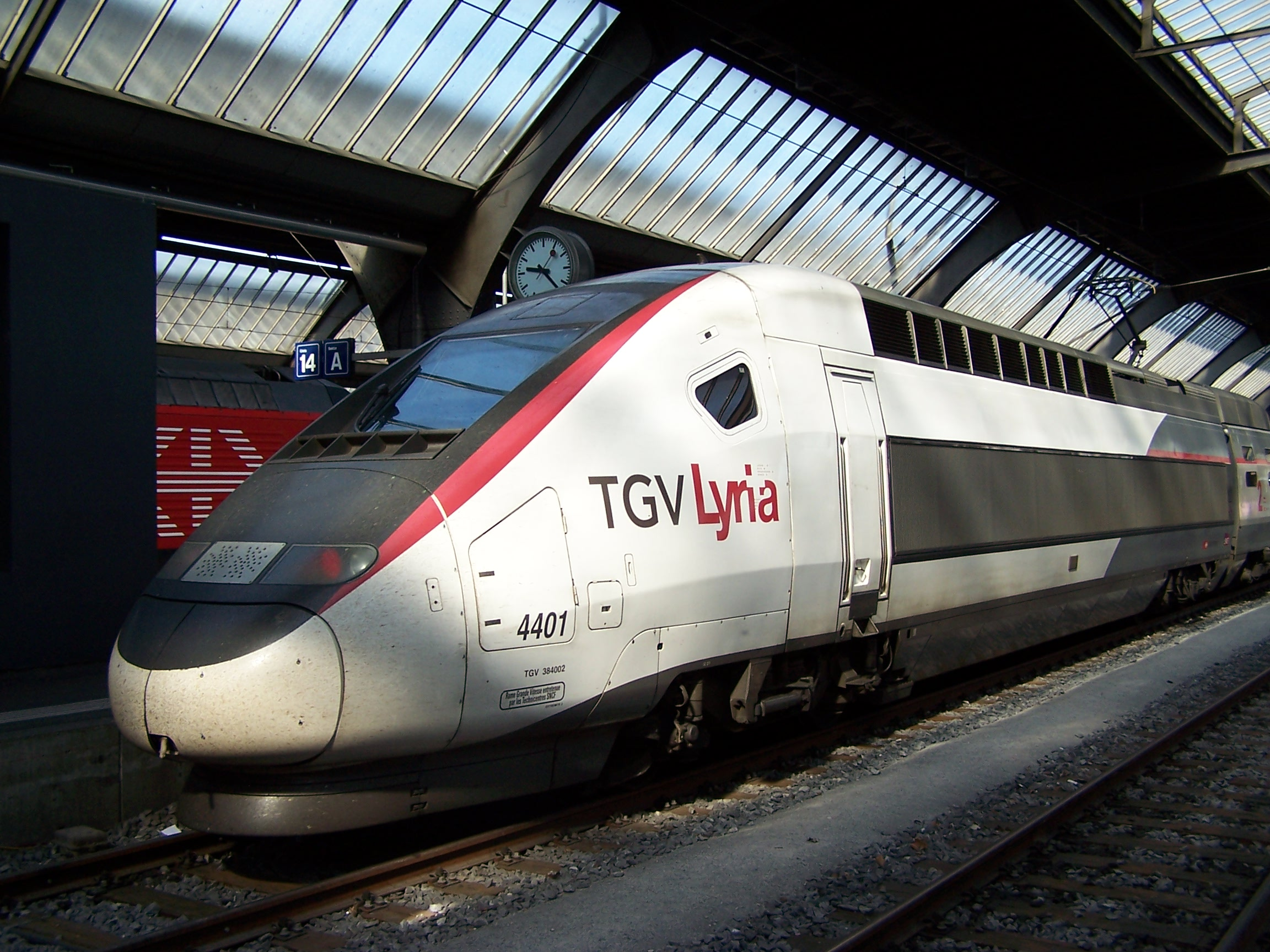
TGV Lyria

== Goals ==
Europe's high-speed railways create added value for passengers by joining forces and continuously working to increase the capacity of the high-speed network and upgrade routes. The aim is to offer passengers seamless travel chains between many European cities, with shorter journey times and more frequent connections, as well as uniform service and quality standards. The development of a common network should thus offer a competitive alternative to car and plane for destinations within Europe.

== Company form ==
Railteam is a corporation under Dutch law, a so-called closed company with limited liability (besloten vennootschap, or B.V.) with its registered office in Amsterdam, comparable to a GmbH in Germany. The organisational structure is a mixture of normal company structure and project structure.

== Services to the passengers ==
=== HOTNAT ===
The HOTNAT (hop on the next available train) protection is a commercial agreement between the Railteam members. In case of a missed train connection between their high speed trains, HOTNAT allows passengers to hop on the next available high-speed train without additional cost, even when travelling with two separate train tickets.

HOTNAT is valid:

- if the missed connection is caused by a delay or a cancellation (since 2018) of the preceding train.
- even if the tickets are non-rechangeable and non-refundable.

However, there are restrictions to the HOTNAT protection. It is valid:

- only if the passenger has tickets with a connection between two high speed trains of the 8 Railteam members, not if an InterCity, EuroCity or other classical train is involved.
- only in the station of the originally planned connection, and only if it is one of the 8 Railteam main hubs or larger connecting station (also the transfer between the Paris stations Nord, Est, Gare de Lyon and Montparnasse is covered).
- only if there is capacity available on board of the train.

The passenger must ask for a "hop on the next available train" stamp on the ticket or a form from the conductor (train manager) of the delayed or cancelled train, or from the staff at the service desk at the station.

It is not necessary to change the ticket or to rebook. Depending on seat availability, the passenger can sit in any available seat. This can mean standing up when the train is full.

Besides HOTNAT, there are other protections for rail passengers to use the next possible train without additional costs when they miss a connecting train and lose their seat reservation due to a delay or cancellation of the first train:

- the strong protection of the CIV, only when travelling with a single ticket (through ticket)
- the Agreement on Journey Continuation (AJC) when the CIV or HOTNAT protection is not valid, for a missed connection with separate tickets, between 15 major European rail operators

=== Lounges for frequent travellers ===
As a first step towards unification, mutual recognition of the frequent traveller programmes with regard to access to the lounges at the stations of the member companies was completed. Thus, since 1 July 2007, holders of a DB BahnCard with bahn.comfort status and holders of an SBB 1st class general season ticket have been allowed to use the lounges of the participating companies.

The individual members have set up differently designed programmes for their respective frequent travellers. These are:

- Deutsche Bahn: bahn.comfort (since 2002)
- SNCF Voyageurs: Grand Voyageur
- Eurostar: ClubEurostar
- NS International: NS Business Card
- SBB General-Abo 1st class
- ÖBB: Österreichcard 1st class
