= CIV (rail travel) =

Set of international rules

CIV or International Convention for the transportation of Passengers (French: Convention Internationale pour le transport des Voyageurs) in rail transport refers to a set of uniform rules shared by European railway operators and covering international journeys. It was established by the Convention concerning International Carriage by Rail (COTIF), article 3.

== Overview ==
The full current title is the Uniform Rules concerning the Contract of International Carriage of Passengers by Rail (CGT-CIV, French: Conditions générales de transport pour le transport international ferroviaire des voyageurs), formerly the Uniform Rules concerning the Contract for International Carriage of Passengers and Luggage by Rail. Mention of luggage was removed from the title of the CIV Uniform Rules in the 2000 version. It provides equivalent protection to the Warsaw Convention (now Montreal Convention) for international travel by air, and the Athens Convention covering international travel by sea.

The acronym "CIV" is printed on the corner of tickets issued to show that they are covered under the terms of the contract, primarily providing compensation for lost baggage and a guarantee of onward transport in the event of a cancelled or missed connections.

== Provisions ==
The contract covers the passengers, along with any accompanying articles (hand luggage, registered baggage, vehicles and trailers) and live animals. The traveller is responsible for full supervision of animals and their hand luggage.

The conditions cover the rail journey itself, along with any intermediate inland waterway, international ferry or coach transport. The transport carriers are required to deliver the passenger and their luggage to their destination, as shown on their ticket. Alternatives must be provided by the carrier to cover missed or cancelled connections.

Compensation is available in certain circumstances, particularly relating to death, personal injury or lost luggage.

Some accompanied goods may be required to be comply further with the Regulation concerning the Carriage of Dangerous Goods by Rail (RID).

== Application ==
Passengers travelling via London to connect with an onward international train, or rail inclusive ferry journey (Rosslare, Dublin, Hook of Holland, or Eurostar to France/Belgium) are able to buy UK domestic segment tickets to the virtual destination London International (CIV), whose station code is LNE. Such London International (CIV) tickets, in principle, are only issued upon presentation of the existing international "CIV"-denoted ticket, but provide additional benefits such as unrestricted peak-time travel and apply the benefits of guaranteed onward connections.

== Limitations ==
The CIV missed connection protection only applies within a single contract for carriage, in other words, within one ticket. That is, if a missed connection is between two tickets, then the passenger is not entitled to the CIV rights. In such cases the passenger might be covered by the agreements HOTNAT or AJC. For some high speed rail connections operators HOTNAT (hop on the next available train) will allow the passenger to take the following train, an automatic right. The Agreement on Journey Continuation (AJC), is an agreement between 17 European railway operators which allows passengers to continue their international journey, even when their journey is covered by multiple tickets.
