= Rule 240 =

Rule of the Federal Aviation Administration

Federal Aviation Administration Rule 240 mandated that an airline with a delayed or canceled flight had to transfer passengers to another carrier if the second carrier could get passengers to the destination more quickly than the original airline.

The original rule, referring to a federal requirement before airline deregulation in 1978, is long-obsolete; however, the major US airlines have filed "conditions of carriage" with the U.S. Department of Transportation guaranteeing their similar provisions. These provisions vary from airline to airline, and generally apply only to delays that are absolutely the airline's fault, such as mechanical delays, and not to "force majeure" events such as weather, strikes, or "acts of God".

The European equivalent is Flight Compensation Regulation 261/2004.
