= Bus Passenger Rights Regulation 2011 =

European Union regulation for bus passengers

The Bus Passenger Rights Regulation 2011 (EU) No 181/2011 is an EU regulation that creates rights for bus passengers, particularly when delayed.

== Contents ==
Article 19(1) requires that if a bus is delayed over 2 hours, (1) if this delay is expected there is right to re-routing or refund of the ticket price and return service free at earliest opportunity, and (2) if a choice not offered there must be compensation of 50% of ticket price in addition to rights in (1).

Article 20 requires that information is given no later than 30 minutes from the delay.

Article 21 requires that there is assistance by snacks, meals, refreshments in reasonable relation to waiting time.

== See also ==
- EU law
