= Passenger rights =

Passenger rights are the rights of passengers of public transportation. According to passenger rights regulations, a person may be entitled to compensation in the case of:

- injury or death
- delays
- damage or loss of luggage
- erroneous scheduling information

This covers various means of transportation, including

- airplanes
- trains
- buses
- ferries

== Rail transport ==
=== European Union ===
Train passengers in the European Union are entitled to a 25% refund of the ticket price in the case of delays between 60 and 119 minutes. A delay of 120 minutes or more entitles them to a 50% refund.

=== United Kingdom ===
- 20% refund for delays of at least 60 minutes

== See also ==
- Lost luggage

== Bibliography ==
- Stephan Keiler: Ansprüche von Fahrgästen im Kraftomnibusverkehr bei Verspätung und Annullierung im Konzept der Europäischen Passagierrechte, in Binder/Eichel (Hg.), Internationale Dimensionen des Wirtschaftsrechts (Nomos 2013, ISBN 978-3-8329-7837-2).
- Jens Karsten / Christian Schuster-Wolf: Entwicklungen im EU-Passagierrecht 2011-2012 – Teil I, Verbraucher und Recht (VuR) 2012, 463 (PDF; 229 kB); ... - Teil II, VuR 2013, 6.
- Thomas Hilpert: Fahrgastrechte und -pflichten der ÖPNV-Linienverkehre nach dem PBefG. Wissenschaftsverlag, Köln 2012, ISBN 978-3-942720-18-2.
- Henrik Lindemann: Neue Fahrgastrechte im Eisenbahnverkehr, transpress 2011, 10.
- Adolf Rebler: Grundsätze der Haftung bei Unfällen von Fahrgästen in Omnibussen und Straßenbahnen im Linienverkehr, Monatsschrift für Deutsches Recht 2011, 457.
- Hans-Georg Bollweg: Fahrgastrechte im Land- und Luftverkehr. In: Deutscher Verkehrsgerichtstag (Hrsg.): Tagungsband zum 48. Deutschen Verkehrsgerichtstag. Luchterhand, Köln 2010, ISBN 978-3-472-07849-4, S. 59 ff.
- Hans-Georg Bollweg: Die Kundenrechte des Flug-, Bahn- und Busverkehrs im Vergleich. Reiserecht aktuell (RRa) 2010, 106.
- Ernst Führich: Reiserecht. Handbuch des Reisevertrags-, Reisevermittlungs-, Reiseversicherungs- und Individualreiserechts. 6. Auflage. C. H. Beck, 2010, ISBN 978-3-406-60413-3.
- Haak: Haftung bei der Personenbeförderung - Rechtliche Entwicklungen im Bereich der internationalen Personenbeförderung, Transportrecht (transpr) 2009, 162.
- Raphael v. Heereman: Referat zum Deutschen Verkehrsgerichtstag zur Verordnung EG Nr. 261/2004 ... In: Deutscher Verkehrsgerichtstag (Hrsg.): Tagungsband zum 48. Deutschen Verkehrsgerichtstag. Luchterhand, Köln 2010, ISBN 978-3-472-07849-4, S. 69 ff.
- Henrik Lindemann: Fahrgastrechte im Eisenbahnverkehr. In: Deutscher Verkehrsgerichtstag (Hrsg.): Tagungsband zum 48. Deutschen Verkehrsgerichtstag. Luchterhand, Köln 2010, ISBN 978-3-472-07849-4, S. 77 ff.
- Silvia Schattenkirchner: Fahrgastrechte im Land- und Luftverkehr. In: Deutscher Verkehrsgerichtstag (Hrsg.): Tagungsband zum 48. Deutschen Verkehrsgerichtstag. Luchterhand, Köln 2010, ISBN 978-3-472-07849-4, S. 92 ff.
- Ronald Schmid / Holger Hopperdietzel: Die Fluggastrechte - eine Momentaufnahme, NJW 2010, 1905.
- Martin Schiefelbusch, Uwe Böhme, Nancy Neugebauer, Michael Pohar: Verbraucherschutz im öffentlichen Verkehr. In: Martin Schiefelbusch, Hans-Liudger Dienel (Hrsg.), Kundeninteressen im öffentlichen Verkehr. Verbraucherschutz und Verbraucherbeteiligung. Erich-Schmidt-Verlag, Berlin 2009, ISBN 978-3-503-11009-4 , S. 39–124. (Schriftenreihe für Verkehr und Technik).
