= Air Passengers Rights Regulation =

European Union regulation

Regulation (EC) No 261/2004
- European Union regulation
- Title: Regulation establishing common rules on compensation and assistance to passengers in the event of denied boarding and of cancellation or long delay of flights
- Made by: European Parliament and Council of the European Union
- Made under: Art. 79(2) TEC
- Journal reference: L46, pp. 1–8

History
- Date made: 11 February 2004
- Entry into force: 17 February 2005

Preparative texts
- Reports

Other legislation
- Replaces: Regulation (EEC) No 295/91
- Amended by: —

The Air Passengers Rights Regulation 2004 (Regulation (EC) No 261/2004) is a regulation in EU law establishing common rules on compensation and assistance to passengers in the event of denied boarding, flight cancellations, or long flight delays. It requires compensation of €250 to €600 depending on the flight distance for delays over of at least three hours, (Note: Articles 3 and 4 of Regulation (EC) No 261/2004) cancellations, or being denied boarding from overbooking. Delays shorter than three hours means no entitlement to any compensation of any kind even if the delay was classified as non-extraordinary. Airlines must provide refreshments and accommodation where appropriate. The Court of Justice of the European Union has interpreted passenger rights strictly, so that there are virtually no exceptions for airlines to evade their obligations for breach of contract.

Passengers may pursue compensation claims directly with airlines or seek assistance from specialised flight compensation claim management companies.

It repealed Regulation (EEC) No 295/91, and went into effect on 17 February 2005.

== Applicability ==
The regulation applies to any passenger:

- departing from an airport located in the territory of a Member State to which the Treaty applies;
- departing from an EU/EEA member state, or
- travelling to an EU/EEA member state on an airline based in an EU/EEA member state

if that person:

- has a confirmed reservation on the flight, and
- arrived in time for check-in as indicated on the ticket or communication from the airline, or, if no time is so indicated, no less than 45 minutes prior to the scheduled departure time of the flight

or

- has been transferred from the flight for which he/she held a reservation to some other flight

unless

- the passenger is travelling on a free or discounted ticket not available to the general public, other than a ticket obtained from a frequent flyer programme.

It does not apply to helicopter flights, to any flight not operated by a fixed-wing aircraft, nor to flights from Gibraltar Airport. While Switzerland, Iceland and Norway are not members of the EU, the regulation does apply to flights to and from these countries as if they were member states under bilateral agreements.

== Denied boarding ==
Before denying passengers boarding involuntarily, the airline is required to first seek volunteers to give up their reservation in return for whatever benefit is negotiated between the airline and the volunteers. Irrespective of such negotiation, such volunteers are also entitled to reimbursement or rerouting.

If insufficient volunteers are obtained, the airline may then proceed to involuntarily deny passengers the right to board their flight. All passengers so denied must be offered all three types of compensation and assistance.

If the passenger is denied boarding for reasons of health, safety and security, or inadequate documentation, the passenger may not be entitled to compensation or assistance. (Note: Article 2 of Regulation (EC) No 261/2004)

== Cancellation ==
If a flight is cancelled, passengers are automatically entitled to their choice of

1. re-routing to the same destination at the earliest opportunity (under comparable conditions);
2. later rerouting, at the passenger's convenience, to the same destination under comparable conditions (subject to seat availability); or
3. a refund of the ticket as well as a return flight to the point of first departure, when relevant.

Any ticket refund is the price paid for the flight(s) not used, plus the cost of flights already flown in cases where the cancellation has made those flights of no purpose. Where applicable, passengers are also entitled to refreshments, communication and accommodation as described below. Where re-routing is to another airport serving the same destination, the airline must pay for onward transport to the original airport or to a close by destination agreed with the passenger. These choices, and the entitlement to refreshments, etc., apply to all cancellations, regardless of whether the circumstances are extraordinary or not.

It is unclear whether "the earliest opportunity" requires airlines to endorse a ticket onto another carrier.

The airline is also required to pay cash compensation as described below, unless one of the following conditions applies:

- the airline notifies the passengers at least two weeks prior to departure
- the airline notifies the passengers between one and two weeks prior to departure, and re-routes passengers so that they can:
  - depart no more than two hours earlier than scheduled, and
  - arrive no more than four hours later than scheduled
- the airline notifies the passengers less than one week prior to departure, and re-routes passengers so that they can:
  - depart no more than one hour earlier than scheduled, and
  - arrive no more than two hours later than scheduled
- the cancellation was caused by extraordinary circumstances that could not have been avoided by any reasonable measure.

The airline must also provide an explanation to passengers of alternative transport.

== Flight types ==
The requirements for an entitlement to compensation and the specific amount owed depend on the length of a flight, whereas the relevant distance is determined according to the great circle method. The Regulation differentiates between three types of flights:

1. Flights of less than 1,500 km (930 mi) in distance;
2. Flights within the EU of greater than 1,500 km (930 mi) in distance, or any other flight of greater than 1,500 km (930 mi) but less than 3,500 km (2,200 mi) in distance;
3. Flights not within the EU of greater than 3,500 km (2,200 mi) in distance.

Note: In the rest of this article, types 1, 2 and 3 are used to refer to the above thresholds.

== Delays ==
Passengers are entitled to refreshments and communication if the expected delay of the arrival exceeds:

- two hours, in the case of a type 1 flight,
- three hours, in the case of a type 2 flight, or
- four hours, in the case of a type 3 flight.

Furthermore, if the flight is expected to depart on the day after the original scheduled departure time, passengers are entitled to accommodation.

If a flight is delayed by five hours, passengers are additionally entitled to abandon their journey and receive a refund for all unused tickets. They may also ask for a refund on tickets used already if the flight no longer serves any purpose in relation to their original travel plan, and, if relevant, a flight back to their original point of departure at the earliest opportunity.

Flight delay is based on the scheduled arrival time. This is defined as when the doors are opened on the plane and not when it lands.

Although not set out in the text of the regulation, a series of court cases created a rule that in case of an arrival delay of more than 3 hours, passengers are entitled to cash compensation, unless the delay is caused by extraordinary circumstances. Unlike the entitlements to refreshments, communication, or accommodation, this 3-hour threshold does not scale with the distance of the flight.

In October 2017, an EU Court of Appeal confirmed the UK CAA's interpretation that the final destination must be included in the total delay. This means that, if the passenger misses a connection outside the EU and ends up with a delay longer than the times indicated above, even if the delay on the flight leaving the EU was less than the aforementioned times, the total delay will be used and not only the delay on leaving the EU.

== Compensation and assistance ==
There are three broad categories where airlines may be required to make payments or otherwise assist passengers, in cases of delays, flight changes/cancellations or denied boarding.

=== Cash compensation ===
If the requirements for a compensation are met, Article 7 of Regulation (EC) No 261/2004 obligates the operating carrier to offer each passenger a lump-sum payment of:

1. €250, in the case of a type 1 flight;
2. €400, in the case of a type 2 flight;
3. €600, in the case of a type 3 flight.

Where a passenger has been rerouted due to cancellation or denied boarding, the above amounts are payable if the passenger's actual arrival time exceeds the scheduled arrival of their originally booked flights, by two/three/four hours for type 1/2/3 flights respectively. But if rerouting only exceeds the arrival time by less than these thresholds, half of the specified amounts are payable as compensation.

Said cash payments merely serve to compensate a traveller's inconvenience and do not replace or form a part of any potential reimbursements for unused tickets, trips in vain, additional transport costs, meals and accommodation.

Airlines are not obliged to provide cash compensation in the case of extraordinary circumstances which could not have been avoided even if the airline took all reasonable precautions, according to Article 5, Paragraph 3.

=== Rerouting or refunding ===
Rerouting or refunding is, at the passenger's choice, one of the following three reimbursements:

1. Repayment of the cost of unused flight tickets, and for used tickets where the flight(s) taken no longer serve(s) any purpose in relation to the passenger's original travel plan, and where applicable, a flight back to the original point of departure at the earliest opportunity
2. Rerouting under similar conditions to the intended final destination at the earliest opportunity
3. Rerouting under similar conditions to the intended final destination at the passenger's leisure, subject to the availability of seats.

If a passenger's destination is an airport at a city with multiple airports and rerouting results in the passenger being taken to another of those airports, the airline must also pay for transport for the passenger to the original intended airport or an agreed nearby destination.

=== Refreshments, communication and accommodation ===
When passengers become entitled to assistance, they must be offered, free of charge,

- Meals and refreshments in proportion to the waiting time
- Two telephone calls, fax or telex messages, or emails
- Hotel accommodation and transport between the airport and the hotel, if a stay of one or more nights, or a stay additional to that intended by the passenger becomes necessary

In the case of a delay, the airline may withdraw or abrogate these entitlements if offering them would delay the flight further.

== Upgrades and downgrades ==
If a passenger is placed in a higher class than that for which a ticket was purchased, the airline may not request any additional payment.

If a passenger is placed in a lower class than that for which a ticket was purchased, the airline must refund 30/50/75% of the cost of the ticket for type 1/2/3 flights. For the purpose of this condition, flights to the French overseas departments are not considered to be within the European Union. In the 2016 ECJ case of Mennens v Emirates referred by the Düsseldorf District Court, it was ruled that where a ticket covered multiple flights and did not attribute the cost of each flight separately, the percentage refund was to be based on the distance of the affected flight divided by the total distance the passenger is entitled to travel. Taxes and charges that do not depend on the class of ticket purchased can be excluded from the calculation.

== Method of refund ==
Refunds and compensations payable under this regulation may be paid in cash, by electronic bank transfer, bank draft, or cheque. With the signed agreement of a passenger, they may also be paid in travel vouchers or other services.

== Obligation to notify passengers ==
Airlines are obliged to display a notice at their check-in counters stating:

"If you are denied boarding or if your flight is cancelled or delayed for at least two hours, ask at the check-in counter or boarding gate for the text stating your rights, particularly with regard to compensation and assistance."

Additionally, when an airline cancels a flight, denies a person boarding, or incurs a delay exceeding two hours to a flight, it is obliged to provide each passenger affected with a written notice setting out their rights under the regulation, and the contact details of the national body tasked with enforcing the regulation.

== Relevant court cases ==
In the case Wallentin-Hermann v Alitalia—Linee Aeree Italiane SpA (Case C-549/07) of 22 December 2008, the European Court of Justice in Luxembourg ruled on the interpretation of Article 5 of the regulation relating to cancellations, specifically paragraph 3 which states:

An operating air carrier shall not be obliged to pay compensation in accordance with Article 7, if it can prove that the cancellation is caused by extraordinary circumstances which could not have been avoided even if all reasonable measures had been taken.

The Court agreed with Wallentin-Hermann that any technical issues during aircraft maintenance don't constitute "extraordinary circumstances" that would allow airlines to avoid paying passengers compensation for canceled flights. This case therefore closed the loophole which had allowed the airlines to abuse passengers by frivolous interpretation of "technical or extraordinary circumstances"; it further defined the phrase and limited its exploitation. The definition of "technical and/or extraordinary circumstances" by the Court now stands firm and solid: any carrier must prove that the alleged mechanical problem leading to the cancellation was "beyond its actual control", the court affirmed in a statement. In its judgment, the Fourth Chamber of the Court of Justice held:

Extraordinary circumstances” was not defined in the 2004 Regulation, but the phrase was to be interpreted narrowly since article 5(3) constituted a derogation from the principle, indicated in recitals 1 and 2 of the preamble, of protection of consumers, in as much as cancellation of flights caused serious inconvenience to passengers.

However, what actually lies within the concept of defining what is inside or outside of the "actual control of the air carrier" is not clear and is subject to litigation in many EU-states.

Furthermore, in the joined cases of Sturgeon v Condor, and Bock v Air France (C-402/07 and C-432/07), the Fourth Chamber of the European Court of Justice held on 19 November 2009 that despite no express provision in the Regulation to compensate passengers for delay, passengers are now entitled to the compensation as set out in Article 7 for any delay in excess of three hours providing the air carrier cannot raise a defence of "extraordinary circumstances".

"Articles 5, 6 and 7 of Regulation EC 261/2004 must be interpreted as meaning that passengers whose flights are delayed may be treated, for the purposes of the application of the right to compensation, as passengers whose flights are cancelled and they may thus rely on the right to compensation laid down in Article 7 of the regulation where they suffer, on account of a flight delay, a loss of time equal to or in excess of three hours, that is, where they reach their final destination three hours or more after the arrival time originally scheduled by the air carrier."

The fourth Chamber also ruled that under the definition of "extraordinary circumstances", technical faults within an aircraft should not be included and therefore an air carrier cannot rely on a technical fault within an aircraft as a defence from a valid claim under the Regulation, "unless that problem stems from events which, by their nature or origin, are not inherent in the normal exercise of the activity of the air carrier concerned and are beyond its actual control". (Note: Para. 70, Judgment of the Court, C-402/07 and C-432/07) Various passenger rights groups reported the case and encouraged passengers to bring claims against airlines in the event of a delay of over three hours.

The Sturgeon ruling was reconfirmed in a ruling of the European Court of Justice on 23 October 2012 in Nelson v Deutsche Lufthansa AG and R (TUI Travel, British Airways, easyjet and IATA) v Civil Aviation Authority.

In the case of Denise McDonagh v Ryanair Ltd (C-12/11), the Third Chamber of the European Court of Justice ruled that natural disasters such as the eruption of the Icelandic volcano Eyjafjallajökull and the subsequent cloud of volcanic ash in 2010, which shut down most European air traffic, do constitute "extraordinary circumstances" that release air carriers from the obligation to pay compensation, but that there is no such category as "super-extraordinary circumstances" that would release them from the obligation to provide care. According to the court's ruling, air carriers continued to have an obligation of care towards passengers under Art. 5 and 8 of the regulation during the week-long shutdown of European airspace, and this obligation does not have a temporal or monetary limit.

In the case of Jet2 vs. Huzar, the English Court of Appeal ruled on 11 June 2014 that "ordinary technical problems that cause flight disruption, such as component failure and general wear and tear, should not be considered “extraordinary circumstances”". Therefore, general technical faults found during routine maintenance checks before departure will generally not be considered "extraordinary circumstances".

On 4 September 2014, in the case of Germanwings GmbH v. Ronny Henning (C-452/13), the Ninth Chamber of the European Court of Justice ruled that

the concept of ‘arrival time’, which is used to determine the length of the delay to which passengers on a flight have been subject, refers to the time at which at least one of the doors of the aircraft is opened, the assumption being that, at that moment, the passengers are permitted to leave the aircraft.

Germanwings initially refused to pay the passenger compensation, arguing the delay was 2 hours and 58 minutes when the plane touched the ground.

In September 2015, the Court of Justice of the European Union ruled that air carriers are required to compensate passengers even for unforeseen technical problems, since "the functioning of aircraft inevitably gives rise to technical problems" and "the premature malfunction of certain components of an aircraft" are expected as part of an air carrier's operations. However, certain technical problems resulting from hidden manufacturing defects affecting the safety of flights, or acts of sabotage or terrorism, may exempt air carriers from their obligation to pay compensation.

SAS pilots went on strike in April 2019 after wage talks broke down. Reuters have reported more than 1,200 flights have been canceled. SAS consistently denied compensation to passengers who have been affected claiming the strike was beyond their control. Technically, SAS claimed extraordinary circumstances (art. 5 (3) Reg. (EC) No 261/2004)). “The EuCJ turned down that argument and swiftly so. Strikes "fall within the normal management of carrier's activities"; also, "the employer retains control over events to a certain extent". However, this does not apply to strikes from third-party staff (e.g. strike of air traffic control).” In conclusion, passengers are entitled to compensation if their flight has been disrupted due to a strike by the airline's staff.

In Joined Cases C-156/22 to C-158/22 against TAP Portugal, the ECJ ruled that the death of a pilot due to operate a flight was not deemed to be extraordinary circumstances, as the absence of a member of staff "constitutes an event inherent in the normal exercise of that carrier’s activity".

== Intermediaries ==
The general difficulties claiming from airlines directly has led to the rise of online intermediaries that operate on a "no-win, no fee" basis contingency fee. All help filing claims against airlines, including going to court if necessary.

In response, airlines have repeatedly criticised such intermediaries for forcing more costs on the airline industry, which then passes extra costs on to passengers in the form of increased ticket prices. For example, in response to the added pressure caused by the increase in EU 261 claims in recent years, in 2011 Ryanair put in place a €2.00 surcharge per ticket to compensate for its additional costs. In 2013 it then increased this levy to €2.50.

== Brexit and British consumers ==
In preparing for Brexit, the UK Government announced it would convert directly applicable EU laws into UK law in its Great Repeal Bill White Paper as early as 2018. Consequently, the European Union (Withdrawal) Act 2018, which took effect on 30 December 2020, retained European statutes such as Regulation (EC) No 261/2004 that applied in the UK prior to its exit. As a result, the Air Passenger Rights Regulation was ported over to the UK's domestic law before the end of the transition period. Thus, while Regulation (EC) No 261/2004 itself no longer applies to flights departing in the UK as of 1 January 2021, its new equivalent in British law ("UK261") subjects British carriers and other airlines not headquartered in Europe to similar provisions on those routes. Specifically, UK 261 applies to all flights operated by UK carriers, all domestic flights and flights departing from the UK. As being UK version of EU 261, it essentially covers the same issues including flight disruptions and passenger rights corresponding to them.

Now, with UK 261 is in effect, passenger can be protected by both regulations in some case, whereas only one regulation might be applicable in others. For instance, while a UK carrier's flight from a EU airport to a third country is covered by both EU 261 and UK 261, a flight operated by a third country carrier departing from the UK is only covered by UK 261.

However, the Repeal Bill does state that the regulation will continue to apply ‘until legislators in the UK decide otherwise’. Effectively, this allows the British parliament to amend the regulation or to drop it from UK law entirely at a later date — though flights to the EU on EU airlines will still be covered by the original regulation regardless. Likewise, while the European Union (Withdrawal) Act 2018 converted the ECJ's jurisdiction up until the end of 2020 into British case law, British courts could have deviated from these previous rulings under the same principles that guided their treatment of earlier decisions by domestic judges.

== 2013 Proposal ==
In 2013 the European Commission proposed a number of revisions to the regulation, which have not yet been adopted as of 2021,:

- Airlines will be obliged to inform passengers about flight delays within 30 minutes after the scheduled departure time
- The definition of "extraordinary circumstances" will be further clarified to include natural disasters or air traffic control strikes, and to exclude technical problems identified during routine maintenance
- With respect to compensation for long delays, which was never explicitly stated in the original regulation but added by the European Court of Justice, a threshold of five hours for type 1 and 2 flights, 9 hours for type 3 flights up to 6,000 km (3,700 mi), and 12 hours for longer flights will be established.
- The right to refreshments and communication will become applicable after two hours irrespective of the length of flight.
- An explicit right to refreshments, communication, accommodation, and assistance will be added for circumstances where passengers experience a delay at their final destinations due to the late arrival of connecting flights.
- Airlines will be required to reroute passengers on another carrier if they cannot accommodate them themselves within 12 hours after the scheduled departure time.
- Airlines will be obliged to give passengers access to toilets, drinking water, air conditioning, and medical assistance after a tarmac delay of one hour or more and refreshments after two hours, and to permit passengers to disembark after a tarmac delay of five hours or more.
- Rescheduling of a flight within two weeks before its departure time will give rise to the same rights as a cancellation.
- Passengers will be entitled to corrections of misspelt names free of charge except within 48 hours of departure.
- Airlines will be prohibited from cancelling the return leg of a ticket for reason only that a passenger has failed to use the outbound leg.
- Airlines will be required to give passengers full compensation for mobility equipment lost or damaged during a flight, provided its value was declared at check-in. No charge may be applied for this.
- Forms must be provided at the airport to customers wishing to submit complaints, and these must be accepted as valid claims under the regulation.
- Airlines will be required to accept small musical instruments as cabin baggage and publish the conditions under which they will accept larger instruments.
- Airlines will be obliged to inform passengers of cabin and checked baggage limitations clearly at the time of booking and at airports.
- Airlines will not be required to pay for accommodation of passengers for more than three nights in the event of major disruptions out of their control causing delays or cancellations, except for passengers with reduced mobility, passengers accompanying them, unaccompanied minors, pregnant women, and passengers with specific medical needs. Other than for these types of passengers, delays and cancellations on flights less than 250 km (160 mi) and on aircraft with fewer than 80 seats will no longer give rise to a right to accommodation.
- Airlines and airports will be required to prepare contingency plans for dealing with passengers stranded in large-scale disruptions.

== Recent Developments ==
The European Commission initially proposed a revision of Regulation (EC) No 261/2004 in 2013; however, negotiations remained stalled for several years. In the wake of the COVID-19 pandemic and increasing legal fragmentation across EU member states, momentum to modernize the regulation was renewed in 2024–2025. The revised proposal was formally adopted by the European Commission on 5 June 2025 and subsequently discussed in the European Parliament on 17 June 2025. Further debates and voting procedures are scheduled for September 2025.

For the Council, the revised framework "seeks to establish simpler and clearer rules for air passengers, while striking a better balance between a high level of protection for passengers and preserving connectivity and a level playing field for the aviation sector within the EU’s internal market."

The proposed changes, however, have generated significant controversy and criticism, particularly from passenger rights advocacy organizations and certain parliamentary groups. Critics argue that the draft legislation would impose stricter conditions for passenger compensation, thereby weakening existing rights. Notable differences between the proposed and current regulations:

Flight Distance	Council Proposal (2025)	Current Regulation (EU261)	Criticism
Short-haul (<1,500 km)	€300 after a 4-hour delay	€250 after a 3-hour delay	Rolls back 3-hour threshold although there is a slight increase in compensation amount.
Medium-haul (1,500–3,500 km)	€400 after a 5-hour delay	€400 after a 3-hour delay	Raises the 3-hour threshold for compensation to 5 hours.
Long-haul (>3,500 km)	€500 after a 6-hour delay	€600 after a 3-hour delay	Makes it harder for passengers to be eligible for compensation as it raises the 3-hour threshold to 6 hours while reducing compensation amount by €100.
Rerouting Reimbursement	Allowed after 3 hours	Only airline-controlled	Slight improvement, however, a cap on reimbursement might not be enough to cover what has been spent for the next flight.
Tarmac Delay Disembarkation	Required after 3 hours	Unclear provisions.	Improves the air passenger rights.
Deadline for Airline Response	14 days	Varies by airline	Improves the air passenger rights.
Claim Eligibility	6-month window	Varies by country	A well-defined application window that applies to all member countries is a positive step. However, the proposed time frame of 6 months represents a rollback, as it is already shorter than the current application deadlines in almost all countries.

While the proposed reform includes certain improvements, such as reducing legal uncertainty by clarifying the definition of "extraordinary circumstances," enhancing protections for connecting journeys, and improving access to information for consumers during disruptions, it has also been criticized for significantly weakening key passenger rights. According to passenger advocacy groups, the changes could exclude up to 60% of passengers who are currently eligible for compensation under the existing regulation. Although the reform aims to simplify the compensation process for flight disruptions, critics argue that it shifts the balance away from passengers, potentially resulting in longer delay thresholds and fewer compensation payouts.

== See also ==
- EU law
- Rail Passenger Rights Regulation 2007
- Bus Passenger Rights Regulation 2011
- Montreal Convention for the Unification of Certain Rules for International Carriage
- Rule 240 – the equivalent regulation in the United States
- Contract of carriage – contract between the airline and passenger
