= Rail Europe =

Rail Europe may refer to:

- Rail Europe (company), a European rail ticket distributor
- Raileurope.co.uk, an online booking service for train travel
- Oui.sncf, an internet ticket agent

== See also ==
- Eurail, a European rail pass
- RailNetEurope, a non-profit travel association
- Rail transport in Europe
