= Guillaume Pepy =

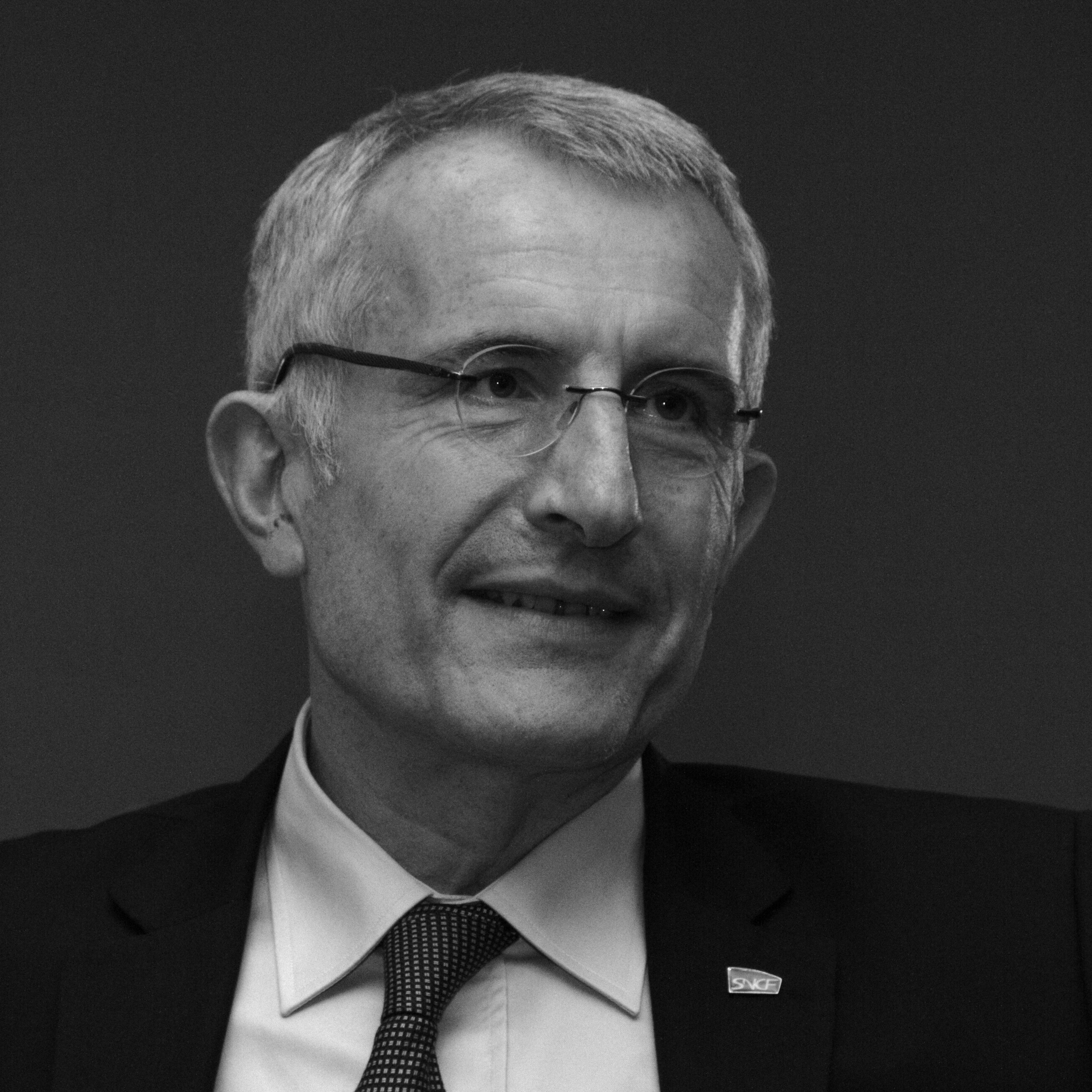
- Born: 26 May 1958 (age 68); Neuilly-sur-Seine, France
- Education: Sciences Po, ÉNA
- Occupations: CEO of SNCF (2008-2019); Chairman of the supervisory board of Emlyon Business School (Since 2022)

Guillaume Pepy (born 26 May 1958) is a high-ranking French civil servant who currently serves as president of the SNCF, the French national rail authority. He is also chairman of Eurostar and deputy-chairman of the Keolis Group.

President Nicolas Sarkozy appointed Pepy to run the state-owned enterprise on 27 February 2008 for a term of five years. In his Letter of Engagement, the Head of State asked him to make the development and modernisation of the enterprise the priorities of his mandate and that SNCF should enter, body and soul, into the era of development and competition. He was re-appointed for a new term by François Hollande in 2013.

== Early life and education ==
Pepy attended the École alsacienne high school in Paris. He is a graduate of Sciences Po and a former alumnus of École nationale d'administration, in the Louise Michel year (1984).

== Career in the public sector ==
An Auditor and then Master of Requests at the Conseil d'État ("Council of State", the highest French Administrative Court - 1987), Pepy worked in a number of ministerial private offices, was a technical advisor to Budget Minister Michel Charasse (1988), and Chief of Staff for the Minister for Public Service Michel Durafour and the Minister of Labour Martine Aubry.

== Career in the private sector ==
In 1995, Pepy was appointed deputy chief executive officer of the Sofres group with special responsibility for business development.

Pepy joined SNCF for the first time in 1988 as chief of staff to the then chairman, Jacques Fournier. After a stint in various ministerial private offices (1990–1993), he came back as Head of Investment, Economy and Strategy.

In 1997, he was put in charge of Mainline Services and in 1998, became deputy chief executive officer with responsibility for all passenger activities (TER regional, Transilien Greater Paris suburban services, mainline services, rolling stock and operations). He instituted a new low fares policy designed to boost train occupancy rates using "yield management" flexible pricing techniques. He was also the driving force behind the creation of Voyages-sncf.com, of which he was chairman from 1998 to 2006, and of iDTGV.

In 2003, Louis Gallois appointed him group chief operating officer. Anne-Marie Idrac, chairman in the last 20 months of the term begun by Louis Gallois (July 2006- February 2008), confirmed him in this position.

He was also the prime mover in the launch of the Railteam European high-speed rail operator alliance.

On 11 February 2014, Pepy was among the guests invited to the state dinner hosted by U.S. President Barack Obama in honor of President François Hollande at the White House.

== Other activities ==
- Emlyon Business School, chairman of the supervisory board (since 2022)
- Salesforce, member of the advisory board on Europe, the Middle East and Africa (since 2020)
- Lagardère Group, member of the supervisory board (since 2020)
- Suez, member of the board of directors (since 2008)
- SYSTRA, member of the supervisory board
- Eurostar, member of the board of directors (2002-2009)
- Keolis, member of the board of directors (-2009)

== Personal life ==
From 1986 until 2004, Pepy shared a relationship with Richard Descoings. Due to fear of stigma, their relationship was kept secret until it was acknowledged at Descoing's funeral in 2012.

== Notes ==
Business positions
Preceded by Anne-Marie Idrac	CEO of SNCF; 2008–2019	Succeeded by Jean-Pierre Farandou
