= Trainline EU =

Train app in Europe

Trainline Europe
- Formerly: Capitaine Train; Captain Train
- Founded: May 2009
- Founder: Jean-Daniel Guyot, Martin Ottenwaelter, Valentin Surrel
- Headquarters: Paris, France
- Area served: Europe
- Key people: Matthias Mahr (President)
- Products: Train tickets
- Brands: Trainline
- Services: Online Travel Agency
- Revenue: 22,931,315 (2022)
- Net income: −1,795,059 (2022)
- Owner: Trainline
- Number of employees: 51 (2022)
- Website: www.thetrainline.com

Trainline Europe (previously Captain Train, Capitaine Train) is the European arm of Trainline, Europe's leading train and coach app. Through either its web interface or mobile apps, customers can purchase tickets for a variety of European rail operators. It also has loyalty cards or vouchers and with e-ticket support. In 2016, Captain Train was acquired by Trainline.

== Service ==
The service does not require the creation of a user account, but with an account, tickets can be saved and pre-booked for a certain amount of time (without requiring payment). It also stores applicable fare information (such as age and loyalty cards) in addition to preferences and patterns of travel (such as comfort class and frequently searched for destinations). The customer can then compare itineraries between any two stations served by the included railway services, and reserve, buy or cancel tickets. The service prefers e-tickets, where available, over traditional physical tickets. Any vouchers or coupons offered by carriers are accepted for payment. Once a ticket is booked, it is saved in the user account which can be accessed via web interface or one of the service's respective apps.

Captain Train can be accessed either via a web application, which is compatible with tablet browsers (running either iOS or Android), or via apps for iOS or Android smartphones.

Captain Train covers the following railway companies: SNCF (including its subsidiaries Ouigo and Ouibus), Deutsche Bahn, ÖBB including night trains under the Nightjet brand, Renfe, Eurostar, Thalys, Lyria, Trenitalia, Italo, Thello, Trenord, Westbahn and Leo Express. Its service therefore covers all of France, Germany, Italy, Spain and extends into all neighbouring countries: the United Kingdom, Belgium, the Netherlands, Luxembourg, Denmark, Sweden, Poland, the Czech Republic, Hungary, Austria, Slovenia, Switzerland. The service is available in French (including Swiss French), English (including British English and American English), German (including Austrian German and Swiss German), Spanish, Italian (including Swiss Italian), Portuguese (including European Portuguese and Brazilian Portuguese), Dutch, Danish, Swedish, and Norwegian.

Captain Train works through the carriers' own reservation systems for all searches and transactions; it acts strictly as an intermediary between them and passengers, and does not hold the tickets which it buys and resells. Prices are those charged by the carriers, with no added service charge; Captain Train receives a commission from the carrier on each ticket sale.

== History ==
Captain Train was created by three young engineers: Jean-Daniel Guyot, Martin Ottenwaelter and Valentin Surrel. Finding Voyages-sncf.com insufficiently intuitive to use, they aimed to create an easy-to-use, advertising-free ticket booking service.

On 5 February 2009, the French national competition regulator, the Autorité de la concurrence, found SNCF in breach of the code of commerce for unequal treatment of travel agencies and ordered the railway to pay 5,000,000 euro in fines. This led to a relaxation of access requirements for the SNCF's reservation systems, and the project that became Captain Train was launched three days later, on 8 February.

In May 2009, Elégantes Solutions SAS, later to be renamed Capitaine Train SAS, became licensed as a travel agency and began negotiations and testing to enable the necessary access to the SNCF reservation systems. A request for full access, including post-sale processing, was made in April 2010, but received no response. A contract for full access was finally signed in June 2010, after an update of Voyages-sncf.com, and access became effective six weeks later, in mid-July.

In October 2010 a closed beta version was made available to the developers' family members. In March 2011, access became available by invitation only.

Captain Train began selling iDTGV tickets in August 2011, Lunéa tickets in December 2011 and Deutsche Bahn tickets for travel in Germany and France in May 2012.

The company raised 1.4 million euro in venture capital funds in February 2012, 2.5 million euro in June 2013, and 5.5 million euro in December 2014.

The service was made publicly available in October 2012. At first it was accessible only through the web application; an app for iOS became available in late October 2013, and an Android app in March 2014. In 2015, the service reached approximately 1.3 million users. In April 2016, the number reached 1.6 million.

The service revised its management team at the end of 2014 and appointed Daniel Beutler as the new COO.

In July 2014, the company released an app for the Android Wear Watch, making it the first rail transport app to do so. In April 2015, the service also released an app for the Apple Watch. In March 2016, the company was bought by the British company Trainline.

From July 2018, Trainline sells tickets on behalf of 183 rail and coach companies.
