= Anne-Marie Idrac =

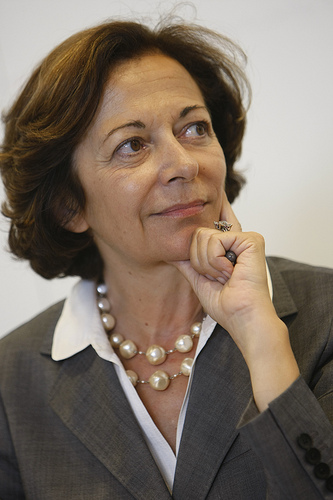

Member of the National Assembly for Yvelines's 3rd constituency
- In office 1997–2002
- Preceded by: Paul-Louis Tenaillon
- Succeeded by: Christian Blanc

Personal details
- Born: Anne-Marie Colin; 27 July 1951 (age 75) Saint-Brieuc, France
- Party: Rally for the Republic (Before; 1997); Union for French Democracy (1997–2007); New Centre (2007–present)
- Spouse: Francis Idrac
- Children: 4
- Parent: André Colin (father)
- Education: Institute of Political Studies, Paris; National School of Administration, Strasbourg

Anne-Marie Idrac (born 27 July 1951 in Saint-Brieuc, Côtes-d'Armor) is a French politician of the Nouveau Centre political party who served as Minister of State for Foreign Trade in the government of Prime Minister François Fillon from 2008 to 2010.

== Early life and education ==
Idrac is an alumna of the Institute of political studies of Paris (Sciences Po), and of the École Nationale d'Administration.

== Career ==
=== Career in the public sector ===
From 1974 to 1995, Idrac worked as civil administrator in various posts in the Minister of Public Works (France), of housing, of the environment, of urbanism and of transports. She was also general director of the public establishment of rural development of Cergy-Pontoise from 1990 to 1993.

=== Political career ===
In 1995, still director of land transports, Idrac was called to the government as woman issued from the civil society, to the post of Transportation State Secretary, which she occupied in the two governments of Prime Minister Alain Juppé. She conducted the legislative reform of 1996 which led to the debt-clearing of the SNCF by the creation of the RFF, and to the experimentation in 5 regions of de-centralisation of regional trains (TER), extended in 2001 by Jean-Claude Gayssot.

Daughter of André Colin, the head of MRP and of political parties which succeeded it at the centre, she chose to join François Bayrou's Democratic Force and the Union for French Democracy (UDF). She was elected UDF deputy of the third circonscription of the Yvelines in 1997 and re-elected in 2002, losing to Hervé Morin to the presidency of the group UDF at the National Assembly. She was chairman of the regional council of the Île-de-France (1998–2002) and was general secretary to the 'Nouvelle Union' for the French Democracy (UDF).

=== Career in state-owned companies ===
In September 2002, Idrac left her mandate and political functions to take on the presidency of the RATP, on the suggestion of Prime Minister Jean-Pierre Raffarin. Christian Blanc, ally to the UDF, who had been one of her predecessors at the RATP, and with whom she has led the fusion of Air-France/Air-Inter to completion, became her successor at the National Assembly. During her time at RATP she managed significant reform while minimising confrontations with unions representing the group's 45,000 employees. Her tenure was marked most notably by the reform of retirement financing, the launching of automation of Parisian metro's line 1, the installation of a guaranteed contractual service in case of strikes, as well as contracts in foreign countries.

Brought back to the post for a mandate of 5 years in July 2004, Idrac resigned on 12 July 2006 to succeed Louis Gallois as head of the SNCF, the latter being called to EADS. At the time, she was one of just two women to run leading French companies. In 2008, however, she was replaced with Guillaume Pepy. During her brief time in office, she was involved in the development of TGV lines at a European dimension, to the relaunch of regional transportation, and to the regeneration of the network for RFF, and to the rectification of the fret situation. She oversaw the creation of an autonomous fund for retired railwaymen, rendered necessary by the application to enterprise of IFRS accounting norms.

Ahead of the 2012 presidential election, Idrac endorsed François Bayrou's candidacy as President of France.

In 2018, news reported that Idrac was among the contenders in the frame for the interim CEO role at Air France-KLM after the departure of Jean-Marc Janaillac; instead, the position went to Anne-Marie Couderc.

== Other activities ==
=== Corporate boards ===
- Google Cloud Platform, Member of the European Advisory Board (since 2022)
- SANEF, Member of the Board of Directors (since 2019)
- Air France–KLM, Independent Member of the Board of Directors
- Bouygues, Member of the Board of Directors (since 2012)
- Saint-Gobain, Member of the Board of Directors
- Total, Member of the Advisory Board
- Sia Partners, Senior Advisor (since 2011)
- Bridgepoint Advisers, Member of the European Advisory Board
- Toulouse–Blagnac Airport, chairwoman of the supervisory board (2015-2018)
- Dexia, member of the advisory board (2002–2007)

=== Non-profit organizations ===
- Member of the Orientation Council of the association En Temps Réel
- Institut français des relations internationales (IFRI), Member of the Administration Council
- Robert Schuman Foundation, Member of the Board of Directors
- HEC School of Management, Member of the Advisory Board
- Junior official of the National defence Institute of high studies (IHEDN), in 1986–87 (XXXIXe session)
- European-French Movement, President (2000-2004)

== Governmental functions ==
- Secretary of state to the ministry of rural development, in charge of transportation to the first government Alain Juppé (from 18 May to 6 November 1995). She used to be a member of the Juppettes.
- Secretary of State to the ministry of Equipment, of housing and of Transports and Tourism, in charge of the Transports in the second government of Alain Juppé (from 6 November 1995 to 4 June 1997).
- Secretary of State to the ministry of Economy, Industry and Employment, in charge of Foreign Commerce in the second government of François Fillon (from 18 March 2008 to 13 November 2010).

== Recognition ==
In 2007, Idrac was named one of Europe's 25 top businesswomen in the Financial Times annual ranking.
