= KKday =

Taiwanese online travel agency

- Industry: Travel
- Founded: 2014; 12 years ago in Tapei, Taiwan
- Founder: Ming Chen
- Headquarters: Taipei, Taiwan
- Key people: Ming Chen (CEO); Victor Tseng (CFO)
- Brands: KKday; Rezio; FineDay; Activity Japan
- Services: Online Travel Agency; Ticketing; Booking Management
- Number of employees: 960 (2025)
- Website: kkday.com

KKday is an online travel e-commerce platform focused on connecting independent travelers with authentic, curated local experiences, tours, activities, and attraction tickets.

== History ==
KKday was founded in 2014 in Taipei, Taiwan, by CEO Ming Chen, who previously started and led both Star Travel and Ezfly to IPO.

In March of 2016, the company raised US$4.5 million in a Series A round led by AppWorks Ventures with participation by 91Capital. The raise allowed KKday to open offices and expand into Hong Kong, Japan, South Korea and Singapore by 2016. By the end of 2016, KKday offered over 6,000 travel experiences across 53 countries and 174 cities, marking early international expansion with its official launch in Singapore in October 2016, accompanied by promotional campaigns to attract regional users.

Expansion into Malaysia, Thailand, Vietnam and the Philippines continued throughout 2017 and into 2018, with the company opening offices in Indonesia and mainland China. KKday rapidly expanded its inventory, reaching over 10,000 experiences in more than 500 cities across 80 countries by 2018, with key markets in Taiwan, Hong Kong, and South Korea. In February 2018, KKday raised $10.5 million in a funding round led by Japanese travel giant H.I.S., allowing integration with larger travel networks and further global growth. Forbes reports that by the end of 2018, the company operated in 11 countries and regions, employed around 400 staff, and recorded over 4 million weekly website views with more than 1 million app downloads.

A combination of a Japanese and South Korean trade dispute, along with the Covid-19 pandemic in 2020, led KKday to pivot quickly toward domestic staycations and local experiences while initially raising $70m in their Series C which, was later extended to $95m. The Series C funds were partially used to accelerate and expand Rezio. Launched in 2019, Rezio is KKday's B2B SaaS booking management platform for travel providers, allowing them to track inventory, manage reservations and sell tickets. FineDayClub was launched in 2020 by KKday as a personalized luxury subscription travel service to cater to high end clients. KKday’s CFO, Jenny Tsai pivoted to lead KKday’s new venture.

KKday was able to successfully navigate and adapt to travel patterns during the Covid-19 pandemic by reducing user acquisition costs by two thirds and focusing on domestic travel experiences to drive bookings and revenue. KKday was particularly successful in Vietnam, with bookings increased by 2,000% through 2022 and the company's travel operator platform Rezio, onboarding over 1,200 operators inside the country.

In 2021, KKday acquired Activity Japan, a domestic focused travel company, founded by Kimiharu Obuchi in 2014. The successful acquisition, a key factor in KKday’s rapid expansion in the Japanese market, was facilitated by H.I.S., a common early investor in both platforms.

In 2023 KKday inked a partnership with Rail Europe to create an all-in-one platform for 150 rail lines over 33 European countries with the intent of increasing ridership across Europe.

In late 2024, KKday completed its Series D at $70M, bringing the total amount of capital raised to over $250M. The funds are to be earmarked for continued global expansion, artificial intelligence integration and enhanced partnerships, similar to the partnership with Tablelog, which now allows users to book restaurant reservations at 42,000 restaurants in Japan through the platform.

== Platform ==
KKDay is an e-commerce online travel agency operating in 92 countries with over 350,000 travel experiences available for booking. The company started with focus on authentic local travel experiences in the Asian Pacific market and has expanded to a more global focus. KKday connects travelers with travel services and experiences such as attraction tickets, theme parks, cultural experiences, and seasonal events. KKday has positioned itself as an all-in-one travel super app with booking for hotels, rental cars, flights, sim cards, rail passes, dining and tickets.

=== Rezio ===
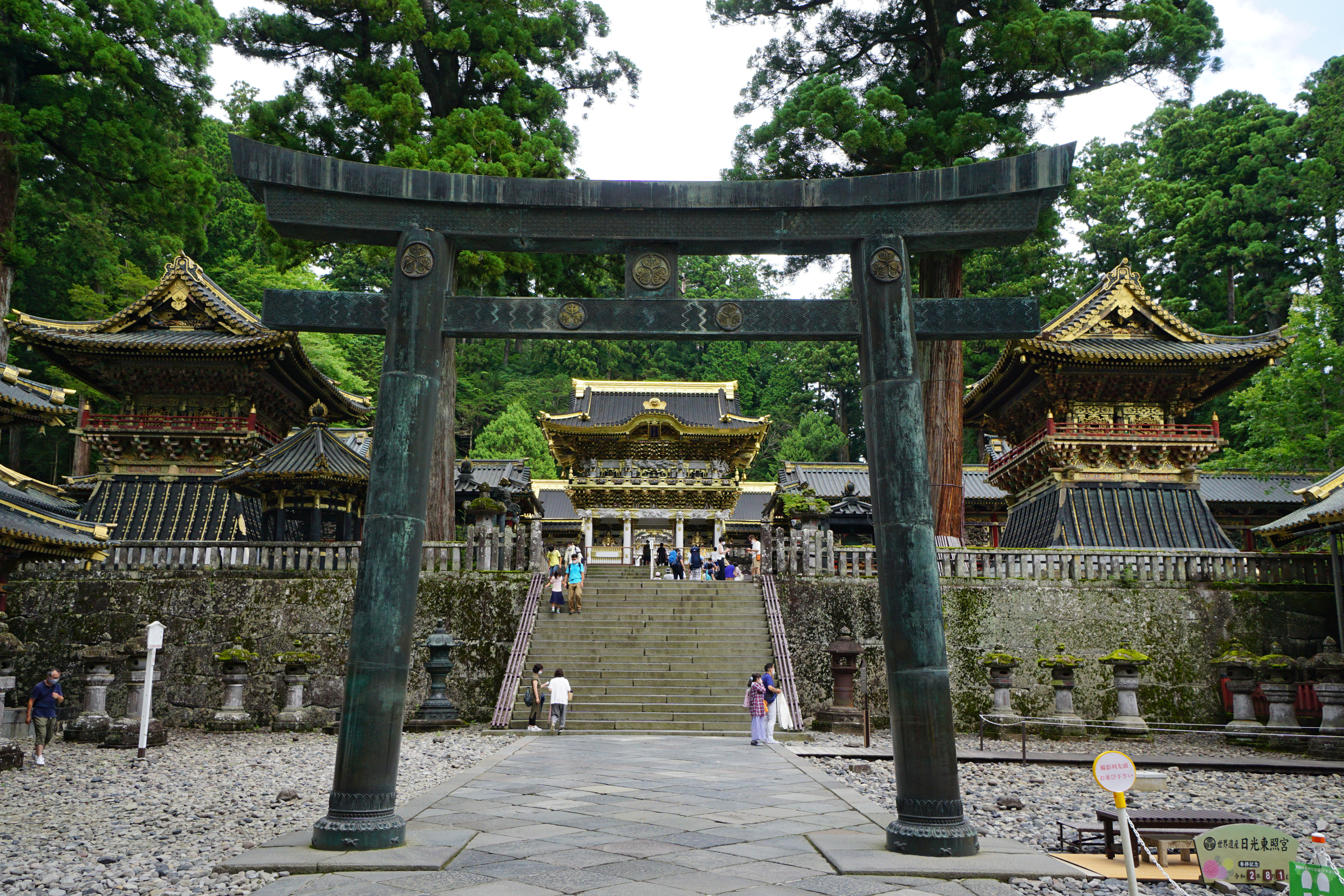
The Nikko Toshogu Shrine.

Rezio is a cloud-based SaaS booking management platform developed by KKday specifically for tour operators, activity providers, and attractions in the travel industry. It serves as an all-in-one system designed to help these businesses digitize their operations, particularly those previously relying on offline processes. Features include a mobile app for on-the-go order management, customer information checks, and voucher scanning, as well as channel management, analytics for customer data, and integrations with multiple OTAs and payment providers. Unlike KKday, which is an OTA marketplace for consumer exposure (with commissions), Rezio focuses on backend operations for suppliers, allowing brand independence, operational efficiency, and direct customer relationships while optionally connecting to OTAs like KKday. Rezio supports over 5,000 merchants, 30,000 experiences, and 10 million travelers worldwide, with a strong presence in Asia.

One of the brands successful implementations was at the Nikko Toshogu Shrine where Rezio was implemented to help with long lines and wait times due to over-tourism. The shrine was able to implement the inventory management features to allow online booking and cashless payments onsite.

=== FineDayClub ===
FineDayClub is a membership-based travel concierge service launched in late 2020 by KKday. It is aimed at families, and organizations seeking customized travel experiences. It offers one-on-one advisory services.

=== ActivityJapan ===
ActivityJapan is a Japanese comprehensive online travel site that specializes in authentic Japanese travel experiences. It was purchased by KKday in 2021 but continues to operate independently.
