= EuroSpec =

European Specification for Railway Vehicles

Logo of EuroSpec

EuroSpec, abbreviation for European Specification for Railway Vehicles, is an initiative of several European railway companies with the aim to develop common, explicit technical specifications for train systems and components. The jointly developed specifications support and facilitate the process of purchasing trains. These specifications are not in the competitive domain. The continued application of the EuroSpec methodology and the developed specifications support the standardisation of trains and lead to higher quality, support the development of vehicle platforms and provide significant cost savings. As a basis for developing their specifications, EuroSpec partners have developed a "Requirement Management" manual to ensure the necessary consistency between the specifications and their quality. The work started in 2011.
The functional requirements for rail vehicles of the EuroSpec specifications are used in procurement in addition to the technical specifications for interoperability, the EN standards and the national notified technical rules (NNTR).
The EuroSpec consortium does not prepare "European Standards" or "International Standards" within the meaning of Regulation (EU) No 1025/2012 of the European Parliament and of the Council of 25 October 2012. EuroSpec specifications should therefore be classified as a "technical specification". They are increasingly used as input for European Standards and Regulations.

== Members ==
The EuroSpec consortium is composed of six European railway companies and the representation of the railway companies in the United Kingdom of Great Britain and Northern Ireland by RSSB. The EuroSpec partners in Europe are:

- SNCF Voyageurs- France
- Rail Safety & Standards Board - United Kingdom of Great Britain and Northern Ireland
- Deutsche Bahn (DB)- Germany
- Nederlandse Spoorwegen (NS) - Netherlands
- ÖBB - Austria
- Swiss Federal Railways (SBB) - Switzerland

== Vision, mission, approach and values (version 2020) ==
- The vision of EuroSpec is: We develop harmonised rolling stock specifications to improve operating economics and performance.
- Our mission focusses on seven areas, being: representative of European rolling stock procurement departments, visible for the rail sector, well organized, focused, aligned, cooperative and cross-fertilising and being collaborative.
- Our values are: lean, openness, transparency, acceptance of being different, cooperative and foster lower costs, shorter delivery time and speeding up of innovations.

== Legal status and location ==
The EuroSpec consortium, as a merger of several legally and economically independent companies that remain for the temporary introduction of an agreed purpose of the operation, has not chosen a legal form and therefore EuroSpec has no official headquarters either. Informally, the headquarters of the incumbent Chair is the location.

== Published EuroSpec Specifications ==
The EuroSpec consortium publishes the specifications in English only. The following have been published (some in several versions) and are free to download from the EuroSpec website:

  - EuroSpec Air Conditioning
  - EuroSpec Alternative traction energy supply and related infrastructure interfaces - Battery driven systems
  - EuroSpec Automatic Coupler
  - EuroSpec Bicycles on Trains
  - EuroSpec Circularity
  - EuroSpec Common IDs
  - EuroSpec Contact Strips
  - EuroSpec Documentation
  - EuroSpec External Passenger Access Doors
  - EuroSpec On-Board Data Availability
  - EuroSpec Parking Noise
  - EuroSpec Requirement Management
  - EuroSpec Seat Comfort
  - EuroSpec Sliding Steps
  - EuroSpec Software Updates
  - EuroSpec TCMS-Data Service
  - Eurospec Toilets of Railway Vehicles
  - EuroSpec Upgradeability
  - EuroSpec Watertightness
  - EuroSpec Wheel and Brake Disc

== Specifications under development ==
The next EuroSpec specifications are under development: Exterior Access panels, Maintenance Software, Alternative Traction Energy Supply and related infrastructure interfaces – Hydrogen driven systems, Life cycle costs, CCS on Board.

And updates from EuroSpec Air conditioning, Parking Noise and Documentation, Seat Comfort
