= Raileurope.co.uk =

- Loco2 Logo
- Founded: 2006; 20 years ago
- Headquarters: London, {{{location_country}}}
- Founders: Jamie Andrews, Kate Andrews
- Industry: Tourism; Travel technology
- Products: Train and bus tickets, mobile app
- Services: Online travel agency
- Parent: Oui.sncf
- Website: raileurope.co.uk

Raileurope.co.uk (formerly Loco2) is an online booking service for train travel in the United Kingdom and Europe. It sells tickets through its website and via its smartphone app which is available on iOS and Android platforms.

It was founded in 2006 by brother and sister Jamie and Kate Andrews, and started trading in 2012 from its headquarters in London. Loco2 website and apps were rebranded Rail Europe in November 2019.

== Functionality ==
Raileurope.co.uk provides coverage for approximately 25 countries in Europe and is integrated with multiple rail operators, including the Rail Delivery Group in the United Kingdom, SNCF in France, Eurostar, Deutsche Bahn in Germany, SNCB in Belgium, Renfe in Spain and both Italo and Trenitalia in Italy. The company sells fares for all major high-speed rail services in Europe, such as TGV, ICE, Eurostar, AVE, Thalys, Frecciarossa, and Italo.

The company's original name is both an abbreviation of the phrase "low CO_{2}" as well as a reference to locomotive travel. Rail Europe focuses on rail travel in the UK and mainland Europe, as well as some international bus journeys. Raileurope.co.uk continued to have a carbon count facility built into its journey booking process, promoting rail travel's ability to reduce a traveller's carbon footprint by up 90%.

Rail Europe acts as an alternative to traditional rail booking systems by aggregating multiple reservation systems into its service, allowing users to search for and book fares across multiple countries within one transaction. Rail Europe users can access standard rate fares as well as the discounted fares associated with each operator, such as such as Renfe's Turista Promo, Deutsche Bahn's London Sparpreis and Europa Sparpreis, as well as SNCF's Prems fares and the Rail Delivery Group's range of discounted Advance Fares.

== History ==
Loco2 was founded in 2006 by Kate Andrews during her final year as an undergraduate at Sussex University. The goal initially was to launch a low-carbon travel company, specialising in grounded travel. As the company’s focus moved to European rail specifically, she was joined by her brother Jamie Andrews and Technical Director Jon Leighton, a leading contributor to Ruby on Rails.

From 2011 onwards, Loco2 began to integrate with the booking systems of Europe’s major rail operators (and, since 2018, buses too).

The company integrated with the following booking systems in Europe:

- SNCF, including Eurostar (France) 2012
- Deutsche Bahn (Germany) 2013
- Rail Delivery Group (United Kingdom) 2013
- Renfe (Spain) 2014
- Italo (Italy) 2014
- Trenitalia (Italy) 2015
- SNCB (Belgium) 2018
- Busbud (various countries) 2018
- Austrian Federal Railways (ÖBB, Austria) 2019

In 2013, the company partnered with The Guardian to launch "Guardian Trains," a Guardian-branded version of Loco2's train ticket booking application.

In 2014 Loco2 added Vimal Khosla, previously a board member of lastminute.com, to its board.

In 2016, the company underwent a full redesign, updating their logo, colourway and user platform. It also released its first smartphone apps, with an iOS version launched in April and an Android version available from July. For its apps, Loco2 launched an icon-only version of the company logo, suitable for iOS devices.

In 2017, Loco2 was acquired by e-Voyageurs Groupe, the parent company of OUI.sncf, a subsidiary of SNCF.

In December 2018, the founders Jamie Andrews and Kate Andrews announced their departure from the organisation, describing the decision to leave as bittersweet.

In November 2019, Loco2’s website and apps were rebranded as Rail Europe. Rail Europe has been part of OUI.sncf group since 2013 selling rail products across 30 countries and 25,000 destinations. By joining forces with Loco2, both now form the newly expanded international arm of e-voyageurs SNCF.

== Awards ==
- 2013 Winner PEA Awards Responsible Travel Category 2013
- 2018 British Transport Awards: Bronze award for Best European Rail Booking Website
- 2018 National Transport Awards: Transport Supplier of the Year

== Ownership and funding ==
Loco2 was founded as a private company, limited by shares. Its owners include founders Jamie and Kate Andrews as well as members of their family and friends. Additional investment has been secured from individuals and consortiums of angel investors. Shareholders include Ed Gillespie, founder of sustainability strategy and creative agency, Futerra, and author of Only Planet, which documents a low-carbon journey around the world.

The company received a total of £1 million in funding over a number of investment rounds from private angel investors. As part of its investment raising activities the company was featured on the BBC News website in a piece focusing on the "real life Dragons' Den".

On 5 July 2017 Loco2 was bought by e-voyageurs Groupe, which also owns OUI.sncf. At that time, Loco2 co-founders Kate and Jamie Andrews remained with the business. Kate Andrews said it would continue to operate as an independent company, but the new owner would provide the investment needed to develop its search and booking technology while strengthening Voyages-sncf.com's position in the European online rail ticket retailing sector.

== Call for open data ==
In 2011, Loco2's CEO and founder Jamie Andrews called for rail operators to provide "better (and fairer) access to rail data." Andrews argued that a move to standardise data across Europe's different operators would serve to protect passenger rights.

In 2013 the company held a “hack day” at Google Campus in London, showcasing what could be done with open rail data in the UK.

In 2017 co-founder Kate Andrews illustrated how companies such as Loco2 have made booking a train almost as easy as booking a flight by creating what is in effect a single European Rail platform.
