= Béatrice Piron =

French politician

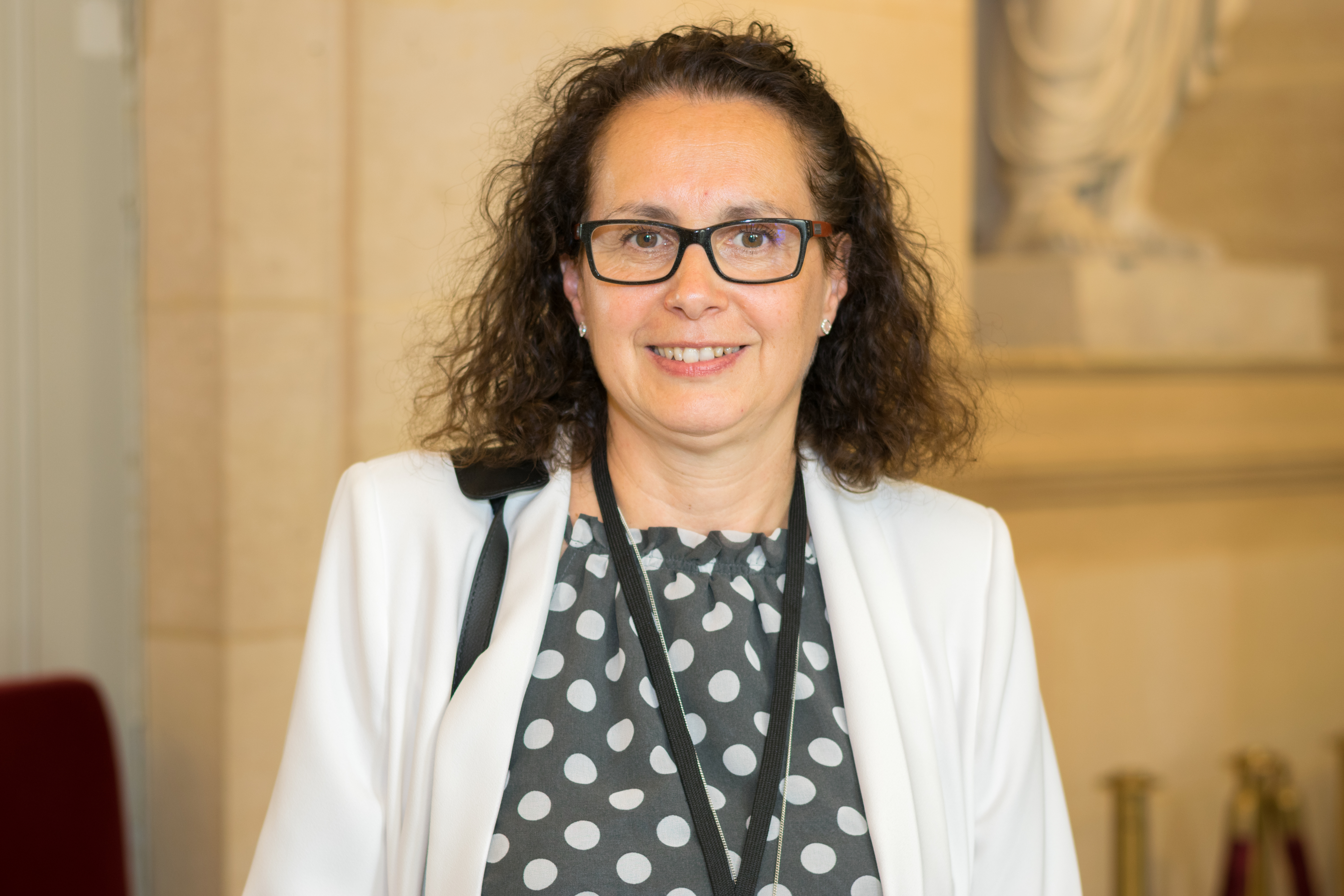

Member of the National Assembly of France for 3rd constituency of Yvelines
- Incumbent
- Assumed office 18 June 2017
- Preceded by: Henri Guaino

Personal details
- Born: 30 August 1965 (age 60) Martigues, France
- Party: Renaissance (since 2017)

Béatrice Piron (born 30 August 1965) is a French politician of Renaissance (RE) who has been serving as a member of the National Assembly since 18 June 2017, representing the department of Yvelines.

== Political career ==
In parliament, Piron serves on the Committee on Cultural Affairs and Education. In addition to her committee assignments, she is part of the French-Japanese Parliamentary Friendship Group, the French-Singaporean Parliamentary Friendship Group, the French-Bahraini Parliamentary Friendship Group, and the French-Qatari Parliamentary Friendship Group.

From 2020 to 2022, Piron served – alongside Stella Dupont – as one of two treasurers of the LREM parliamentary group under chairman Christophe Castaner.

== Other activities ==
- France Médias Monde, Member of the Board of Directors (since 2022)
- Agency for French Education Abroad (AEFE), Member of the Board of Directors

== See also ==
- 2017 French legislative election
