= Colette Le Moal =

French politician

Deputy of the National Assembly for Yvelines's 3rd constituency
- In office 19 April 2008 – 5 August 2010
- Preceded by: Christian Blanc
- Succeeded by: Christian Blanc

Mayor of Bailly
- In office 1977–1995

Personal details
- Born: 27 March 1932 (age 94) Paris, France
- Party: New Centre

Colette Le Moal (born 27 March 1932 in Paris) is a member of the National Assembly of France. She represents the Yvelines department, and is a member of the New Centre.
