= Christian Blanc =

French politician and businessman

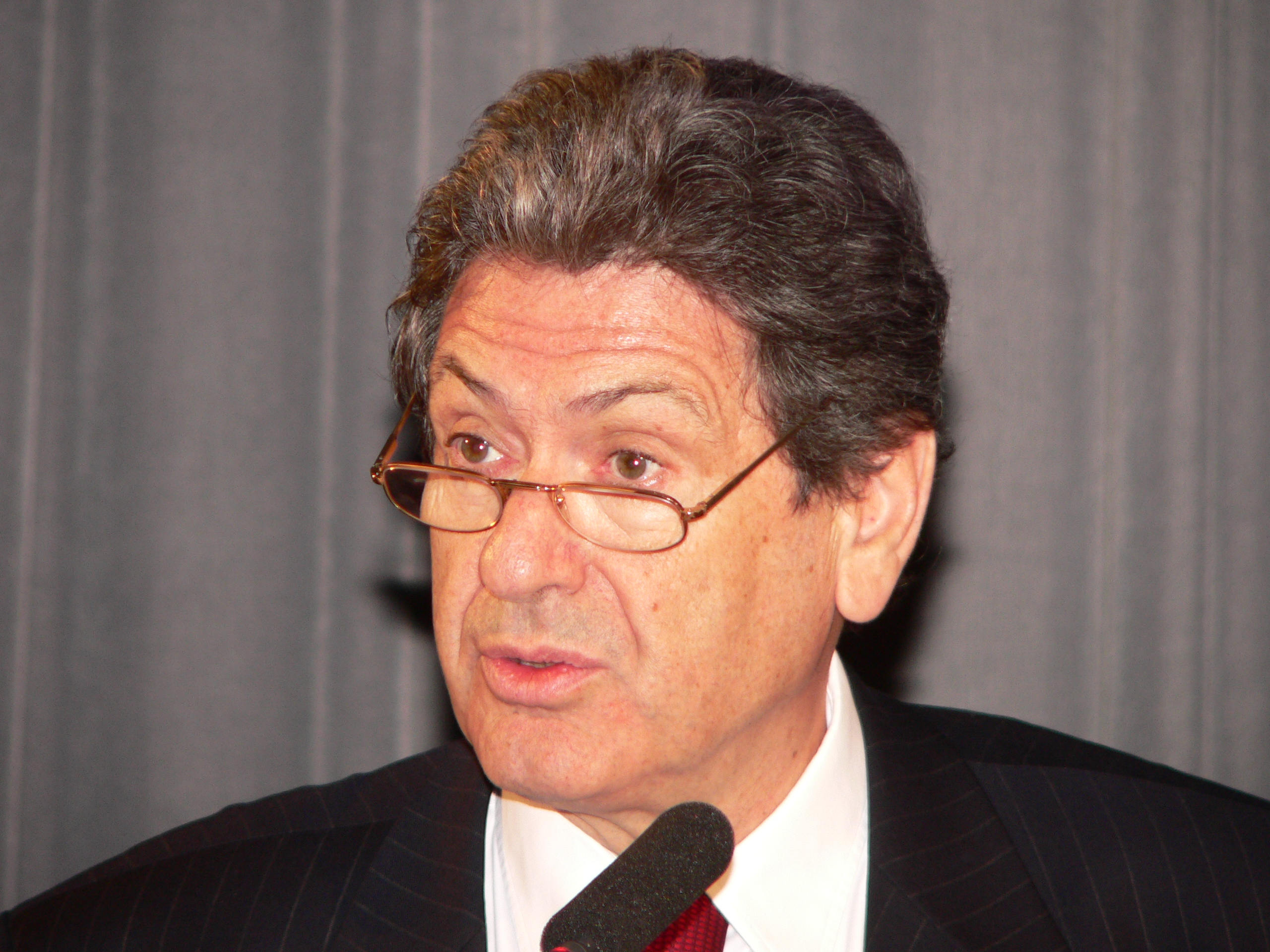

Member of the National Assembly for Yvelines's 3rd constituency
- In office 5 August 2010 – 19 June 2012
- Preceded by: Colette Le Moal
- Succeeded by: Henri Guaino
- In office 16 December 2002 – 19 April 2008
- Preceded by: Anne-Marie Idrac
- Succeeded by: Colette Le Moal

Personal details
- Born: 17 May 1942 (age 84) Talence, France
- Party: The Centrists
- Education: Institut d'études politiques de Bordeaux
- Profession: Civil servant

Christian Blanc (born 17 May 1942) is a French politician and businessman. A former prefect, Blanc also worked as head of the RATP (1989–1992), Air France (1993–1997) and Merrill Lynch France (2000–2002).

Blanc was elected to the National Assembly from the UDF party in 2002. As member of the New Center party, Blanc was appointed to the newly created position of Secretary of State of the Région Capitale ("Greater Paris"), a position he held between March 18, 2008, and July 4, 2010. He retired in 2012 from the National Assembly after two terms.

== Early life and education ==
Christian Blanc is the son of Marcel Blanc, a member of the French Resistance and exotic fruits merchant. Blanc studied at the Lycée Montesquieu in Bordeaux before enrolling in SciencesPo Bordeaux. He became one of the main leaders of the National Union of Students of France, where he met future Prime Minister Michel Rocard. Active at the time in the University Antifascist Front for Peace in Algeria, Blanc is subsequently invited by Fidel Castro to the Latin American Solidarity Conference in Cuba in the summer of 1967.

=== Senior official ===
After graduation, Blanc joined a subsidiary of the Caisse des dépôts, a French public sector financial institution, before becoming bureau chief at the Ministry of Youth and Sports. Closely associated with Michel Rocard, Blanc ran his 1980 Presidential Campaign.

From 1981 to 1983, Blanc was the chief of staff for European Commissioner Edgard Pisani. He becomes prefect in the Hautes-Pyrénées region (1983–1984). Christian Blanc became secretary general of the New Caledonia region with Edgard Pisani, and was then appointed prefect of Seine-et-Marne (1983–1985).

In 1988, Blanc returned to New Caledonia as head of the “Mission of dialogue” mission of the French government, tasked with finding a political solution to the conflict that was shaking the island at the time. He negotiated the Matignon Agreements, adopted by referendum in November 1988.

=== Business executive ===
In 1989, Christian Blanc became the president of RATP. He resigned in 1992, following a spat with the government. During his presidency, RATP decided to create the first automated metro line – Paris Métro Line 14. He was subsequently appointed CEO of Air France in 1993 and tasked with rescuing the company. Under Blanc's leadership, AirFrance became profitable again in 1997.

In 1997, Blanc offered a new strategic plan to continue the restructuring of the company, only to clash with newly elected Prime Minister Lionel Jospin. The disagreement with the government over the need to privatize Air France led to Blanc's resignation in 1997.

Between 1998 and 1999, Christian Blanc served as an advisor to the Lebanese carrier Middle East Airlines.

Between 1999 and 2001, Blanc was the administrator of the Action Against Hunger. At the same time he ran two startups: Skygate, a developer of small-scale satellite receptors, and Karavel, an online travel agency.

In 2000, Blanc was appointed president of Merrill Lynch France. He narrowly escaped the September 11 attacks because he had gone outside for a cigar when the planes struck the World Trade Center.

In September 2014, Christian Blanc was designated CEO of Syphax Airlines, a position he held for just two months because the Tunisian company had failed to go through the necessary administrative procedures allowing it to hire a foreign employee.

=== Political career ===
Blanc began his political career as a member of future Prime Minister Michel Rocard's team in the 1970s, helping Rocard win election as mayor of Conflans-Sainte Honorine in 1977. During François Mitterrand's presidency, he refused offers from both Rocard and later Édith Cresson to enter government and instead remained in his position with the RATP Group.

Blanc stood for election in the 2002 legislative elections in the third electoral district of Paris, running under the banner of the Énergies democrats (Democratic Energies) and winning 9.63% of the vote. He was elected to the National Assembly to represent the third district of Yvelines on 15 December 2002, replacing Anne-Marie Idrac, who had stood down to become president of the RATP. Winning in the first round, Blanc became a member of the UDF party group in the National Assembly.

In 2003, Prime Minister Jean-Pierre Raffarin tasked Blanc with an economic development project. Six months later, Blanc submitted an official report, entitled For an Ecosystem of Growth, whose recommendations included creating business clusters. The French government began putting Blanc's recommendation into effect from 2004 onwards.

In 2006, Blanc called on President Jacques Chirac to resign for the sake of “accelerating reforms” and to put an end to “paralysis.” The same year, he launched the “Committee for the Modernization of France” together with Alain Lambert and Jean-Marie Bockel that sought the “comprehensive and coherent” modernization of the French economy and French society. Blanc also took part in the Pébereau Commission, which calculated France's national debt at €2 trillion.

Blanc was a supporter of the presidential candidacy of Nicolas Sarkozy in the 2007 presidential election and became member of the New Center party during the legislative elections, in which he was re-elected in the first round. Between 2002 and 2007, Blanc served as president of Énergies democrats and the founder of Énergies 2007, movements which supported reforming the French state and pursuing further European integration.

As Vice-president of the New Center, he ran in the 2008 French local elections to become the mayor of Le Chesnay, a wealthy western suburb of Paris, but secured only 36.28% of the vote and failed to unseat the incumbent mayor in a three-way race.

=== State Secretary for Greater Paris (2008-2010) ===
On March 18, 2008, Blanc was appointed Secretary of State of the Région Capitale ("Greater Paris"), a new position in the French Government of François Fillon. Blanc was responsible for crafting the legal framework for the “Greater Paris” project, which entered into law in May 2010 and provided for a network of automated metro lines surrounding Paris. After the French Parliament's enactment of the Greater Paris law, Blanc announced his resignation from the government on July 4, 2010.

In June 2010, after Blanc dismissed his chief of staff, allegations regarding his tax situation appeared over the next eight days in France's Canard Enchaîné newspaper. One week later, the same newspaper claimed that Blanc allegedly used his secretarial budget to purchase cigars worth €12,000 over the course of ten months, a claim which was widely reprinted by French media. In an interview with the Figaro, Blanc accused his former chief of staff Guillaume Jublot, who had been recently fired by Blanc, of feeding false information to the Canard Enchaîné. After discussions with then-Prime Minister François Fillon, the two men released a statement in which they jointly declared it "suitable that Mr. Blanc honors his personal expenses in full." The matter helped accelerate Blanc's decision to leave government, with the opposition and elements of press speculating that his exit might be a tactic by the ruling UMP to turn media attention away from President Nicolas Sarkozy's role in the Woerth-Bettencourt scandal. The UMP denied any such links. Blanc retook his seat in the National Assembly after leaving the government in August 2010 and declined to stand in the 2012 legislative elections.

On December 2, 2011, the High Court of Paris found Christian Blanc to have acted in good faith in relation to the cigar affair and dismissed those charges against him. Whereas the initial claims had been widely covered by the press over the course of several weeks, this acquittal was met with radio silence.

In 2015, Odile Jacob published Blanc's book Paris, ville-monde (Paris, World City), in which Blanc lays out a strategy for France to reclaim a leading role in the global economy.

== Governmental functions ==
Secretary of State for the Development of the Capital Region: 2008-2010 (Resignation on 4 July 2010).

Electoral mandates

National Assembly of France

Member of the National Assembly of France for Yvelines : 2002-2008 (Became secretary of State in 2008) / And since 2010. Elected in 2002, reelected in 2007.
