= Henri Guaino =

French politician (born 1957)

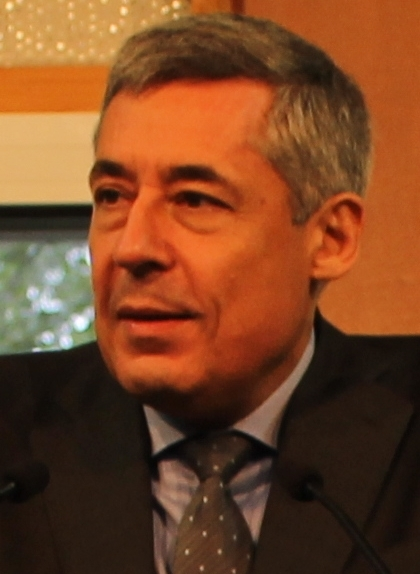
- Guaino in 2012

Member of the National Assembly for Yvelines's 3rd constituency
- In office 20 June 2012 – 20 June 2017
- Preceded by: Christian Blanc
- Succeeded by: Béatrice Piron

Special Adviser to the President of France
- In office 16 May 2007 – 15 May 2012
- President: Nicolas Sarkozy

Personal details
- Born: 11 March 1957 (age 69) Arles, France
- Party: The Republicans (since 2015)
- Other political affiliations: Rally for the Republic (until 2002); Union for a Popular Movement (2002–2015)
- Education: Paris Sorbonne University; Sciences Po; Paris Dauphine University

Henri Guaino (French: [ɑ̃ʁi ɡeno]; born 11 March 1957) is a French economist and former civil servant and politician who represented the 3rd constituency of Yvelines in the National Assembly from 2012 to 2017. A member of The Republicans (LR), he previously was a special adviser and speechwriter to President Nicolas Sarkozy from 2007 to 2012, having been a key campaign aide ahead of the 2007 presidential election.

== Career ==
=== Presidency of Nicolas Sarkozy ===
Guaino was responsible for writing the Dakar address which Sarkozy delivered in 2007 and was criticised for being patronising towards the African continent.

=== National Assembly ===
In the 2012 legislative election, he was elected to the National Assembly for the Yvelines department.

On 3 September 2012, he unexpectedly announced his intention to run for the presidency of the Union for a Popular Movement (UMP). Guaino stated that his aim was to represent the Gaullist component of the UMP's heritage in this internal election, Gaullism, a way forward for France, a movement within the party he co-founded. However, he failed to receive enough endorsements and subsequently announced his endorsement of Jean-François Copé.

In 2017, he announced that he would run for reelection to the National Assembly, but in the 2nd constituency of Paris. His party, The Republicans (formerly the UMP), however nominated former Ecology Minister Nathalie Kosciusko-Morizet to that seat. He ran under the miscellaneous right banner and lost in the first round with just 4.5% of the vote, finishing seventh. Gilles Le Gendre defeated Kosciusko-Morizet in the second round.

== In popular culture ==
In the movie La Conquête (The Conquest), staging Nicolas Sarkozy's life from his appointment at the Ministry of the Interior in 2002 to his election in 2007, Guaino is played by Michel Bompoil.
