= Trainline =

Digital rail and coach technology platform

Trainline plc
- Type: Public company
- Traded as: LSE: TRN; FTSE 250 component
- Industry: Travel
- Founded: 1997
- Headquarters: London, England
- Area served: Europe
- Key people: Brian McBride (Chairman); Jody Ford (CEO)
- Revenue: ▲£452.7 million (2026)
- Operating income: ▲£122.4 million (2026)
- Net income: ▲£79.8 million (2026)
- Number of employees: 986 (2026)
- Website: www.trainlinegroup.com

Trainline plc (formerly Thetrainline.com) is a British digital rail and coach ticketing platform operating across Europe. It sells tickets from multiple rail and coach operators through its website and mobile apps, allowing users to compare and book journeys across different transport providers. The company also provides ticketing and distribution services to other travel businesses through Trainline Solutions. Listed on the London Stock Exchange, it is a constituent of the FTSE 250 Index.

== History ==
Former logo as Thetrainline.com

Trainline was established in 1997 by the Virgin Group, and online ticket sales began in 1999. It was operated under contract by Capgemini. Stagecoach later purchased a 49% shareholding. In February 2004 Trainline merged with Qjump, its main competitor. Stagecoach sold out, leading to Virgin having an 86% shareholding in the merged company with National Express owning the other 14%.

In July 2006, Exponent Private Equity acquired Trainline. Trainline acquired Advanced Smartcard Technologies, including its smartcard software subsidiary Ecebs, in 2007. Ecebs was subsequently sold to Bell ID in November 2012.

KKR acquired Trainline from Exponent in January 2015, ending plans for an initial public offering. In August 2015, the company announced it had changed its name from thetrainline.com to Trainline. In 2016, it acquired Captain Train and re-branded it as Trainline EU.

Trainline was floated on the London Stock Exchange in June 2019, with its shares rising on their first day of trading and valuing the company at nearly £2 billion. At the end of February 2021, Clare Gilmartin stepped down as CEO and was replaced by Jody Ford who had joined the business in July 2020.

Trainline acquired Spanish rail and bus ticketing company Trenes.com in April 2025 as part of its expansion in Spain.

The COVID-19 pandemic substantially reduced rail travel. Trainline's net ticket sales fell from £3.7 billion in the year to February 2020 to £783 million in the following financial year, while the company reported an operating loss of £100 million.

In June 2025, Trainline began offering an AI assistant to handle customer enquiries. The tool was criticised for providing incorrect information that, if followed, could result in customers receiving fines from train companies. The Rail Delivery Group responded to the chatbot by saying, "We expect all retailers to ensure customer information is timely and accurate". Trainline responded by stating that the assistant was in the beta testing phase.

In August 2026, The Competition and Markets Authority launched an investigation into Trainline over alleged drip pricing.

== Business and services ==
Trainline operates an online platform for booking rail and coach tickets through its website and mobile apps. It aggregates fares, timetables and ticket inventory from more than 270 rail and coach operators in over 40 countries, allowing users to compare and purchase journeys from multiple operators.

Trainline also provides B2B ticketing and distribution services through Trainline Solutions. Its Platform One technology supports Trainline's consumer services and is also used to provide booking, retailing and distribution services to rail and coach operators and other travel companies.
