= Yvelines's 3rd constituency =

Constituency of the National Assembly of France

3rd constituency of Yvelines
- inline Constituency of the National Assembly of France

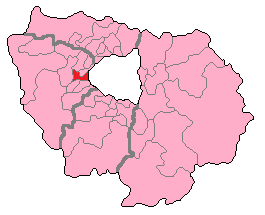
- Yvelines' 3rd constituency shown within Île-de-France
- Deputy: Béatrice Piron; RE
- Department: Yvelines
- Cantons: La Celle-Saint-Cloud, Le Chesnay, Saint-Nom-la-Bretèche, Plaisir (part)
- Registered voters: 81,509

The 3rd constituency of Yvelines is a French legislative constituency in the Yvelines département.

== Description ==
The 3rd constituency of Yvelines includes parts of the wealthy western suburbs of Paris on the border with Hauts-de-Seine and to the north of Versailles.

The seat has consistently supported conservatives; however, until the 2012 elections these came from the centrist UDF rather than the Gaullist right. The constituency's deputy between 2002 and 2010, Christian Blanc, served as a minister in the government of François Fillon but resigned after a scandal concerning use of ministerial allowance's to purchase expensive cigars.

== Historic representation ==
Election	Member	Party
1967	Pierre Métayer	FGDS
1968	Gérard Godon	UDR
1973	Gérard Godon	UDR
1978	Michel Rocard	PS
1981	Michel Rocard	PS
1981	Martine Frachon	PS
1986	Proportional representation – no election by constituency	
1988	Paul-Louis Tenaillon	UDF
1993	Paul-Louis Tenaillon	UDF
1997	Anne-Marie Idrac	UDF
2002	Christian Blanc	UDF
2007	Christian Blanc	NC
2008	Colette Le Moal	NC
2010	Christian Blanc	NC
2012	Henri Guaino	UMP
2017	Béatrice Piron	LREM
2022	Béatrice Piron	RE

== Election results ==
=== 2024 ===
Candidate	Party	Alliance	First round			Second round		
Candidate	Party	Alliance	Votes	%	+/–	Votes	%	+/–
Béatrice Piron	RE	ENS	20,768	34.49	-5.24	38,824	68.75	+34.26
Valentin Salvino	LR-RN	UXD	13,725	22.79	+13.86	17,648	31.25	+8.46
Thomas Ciano	PS	NFP	12,557	20.85	+3.14	WITHDREW		
Othman Nasrou	LR		10,211	16.96	+2.23			
Jérémy Bizet	DVE		1,679	2.79	N/A			
Olivier Le Coq	REC		998	1.66	-8.70			
Olivier Augustin	LO		283	0.47	-0.11			
Valid votes			60,221	98.63	+0.20	56,472	95.99	-2.64
Blank votes			592	0.97	+0.08	1,876	3.19	+2.22
Null votes			242	0.40	+0.12	485	0.82	+0.42
Turnout			61,055	73.10	+18.11	58,833	70.43	-2.67
Abstentions			22,466	26.90	-18.11	24,705	29.57	+2.67
Registered voters			83,521			83,538		
Source: Ministry of the Interior, Le Monde
Result						RE HOLD		

=== 2022 ===
Legislative Election 2022: Yvelines's 3rd constituency
Party	Candidate	Votes	%	±%
LREM (Ensemble)	Béatrice Piron	18,012	39.73	-7.33
LFI (NUPÉS)	Louise Brody	8,029	17.71	+4.42
UDI (UDC)	Bertrand Coquard	6,678	14.73	−10.59
REC	Jean-François Cuignet	4,698	10.36	N/A
RN	Pierre-Yves Pinchaux	4,050	8.93	+3.42
DIV	Isabelle Guigard	2,008	4.43	N/A
Others	N/A	1,865	4.11	
Turnout		45,340	54.99	−0.19
2nd round result
LREM (Ensemble)	Béatrice Piron	28,327	71.40	+12.47
LFI (NUPÉS)	Louise Brody	11,347	28.60	N/A
Turnout		39,674	51.21	+5.97
LREM hold				

=== 2017 ===
Legislative Election 2017: Yvelines's 3rd constituency
Party	Candidate	Votes	%	±%
LREM	Béatrice Piron	21,612	47.06	
LR	Philippe Brillault	11,627	25.32	
LFI	Alexandre Langlois	2,621	5.71	
FN	Stéphanie De Gonneville	2,529	5.51	
PS	Nicolas Hue	2,431	5.29	
DVD	Nicolas Tardy-Jourbert	1,897	4.13	
EELV	Stéphane Galardini	1,051	2.29	
Others	N/A	2,156		
Turnout		45,924	55.18	
2nd round result
LREM	Béatrice Piron	22,192	58.93	
LR	Philippe Brillault	15,466	41.07	
Turnout		37,658	45.24	
LREM gain from LR				

=== 2012 ===
Legislative Election 2012: Yvelines's 3rd constituency
Party	Candidate	Votes	%	±%
UMP	Henri Guaino	13,702	28.12	
PS	Fabienne Gelgon-Bilbault	12,561	25.78	
DVD	Olivier Delaporte*	11,212	23.01	
FN	Sophie Souchere	3,461	7.10	
DVD	Philippe Brillault	3,089	6.34	
EELV	Anne-Marie Rochon	1,272	2.61	
FG	Catherine Radix	1,095	2.25	
Others	N/A	2,339		
Turnout		49,142	60.29	
2nd round result
UMP	Henri Guaino	27,345	61.85	
PS	Fabienne Gelgon-Bilbault	16,870	38.15	
Turnout		45,716	56.09	
UMP gain from NM				

* Withdrew before the 2nd round

=== 2007 ===
Legislative Election 2007: Yvelines's 3rd constituency
Party	Candidate	Votes	%	±%
NM	Christian Blanc	22,535	50.80	
PS	Juliette Quinten	6,490	14.63	
UMP	Philippe Brillault	5,725	12.91	
MoDem	Denis Flamant	5,106	11.51	
FN	Marie-Clotilde de Brosses	1,048	2.36	
LV	Annie Coupas	980	2.21	
Others	N/A	2,472		
Turnout		44,688	64.06	
NM gain from UDF				

=== 2002 ===
Legislative Election 2002: Yvelines's 3rd constituency
Party	Candidate	Votes	%	±%
UDF	Anne-Marie Idrac	15,342	34.22	
UMP	Philippe Brillault	14,100	31.45	
PS	Jacqueline Penez	8,007	17.86	
FN	Bénédicte de Coudenhove	3,330	7.43	
LV	Brigitte Bre Bayle	1,080	2.41	
Others	N/A	2,968		
Turnout		45,182	68.88	
2nd round result
UDF	Anne-Marie Idrac	18,895	57.94	
UMP	Philippe Brillault	13,714	42.06	
Turnout		35,604	54.29	
UDF hold				

=== 1997 ===
Legislative Election 1997: Yvelines's 3rd constituency
Party	Candidate	Votes	%	±%
UDF	Anne-Marie Idrac	15,145	35.58	
PS	Michèle Valladon	8,163	19.18	
RPR	Philippe Brillault*	7,728	18.16	
FN	Pierre-Yves Pinchaux	4,161	9.78	
DVD	Stéphane Buffetaut	1,604	3.77	
PCF	Françoise Amosse	1,449	3.40	
GE	Christophe de Bue	1,305	3.07	
Others	N/A	3,011		
Turnout		43,811	66.90	
2nd round result
UDF	Anne-Marie Idrac	30,222	69.89	
PS	Michèle Valladon	13,022	30.11	
Turnout		45,190	69.01	
UDF hold				

* RPR dissident

== Sources ==
Official results of French elections from 2002: "Résultats électoraux officiels en France" (in French).
