= SNCF Voyageurs =

French state-owned passenger train operator

- Type: State-owned
- Predecessor: SNCF Mobilités
- Founded: 1 January 2020
- Founder: Government of France
- Headquarters: Saint-Denis, France
- Areas served: France; Belgium; Germany; Luxembourg; Switzerland; Italy; Spain
- Key people: Christophe Fanichet (Director)
- Brands: TGV Inoui, Ouigo
- Total assets: €17 billion
- Number of employees: 70000 (2020)
- Parent: SNCF
- Divisions: TGV-Intercités; TER; Transilien; Industrial Operations; Passenger Safety; SNCF Connect & Tech
- Subsidiaries: MASTERIS; Oslo
- Website: www.sncf-voyageurs.com/en/

SNCF Voyageurs (French: [ɛsɛnseɛf vwajaʒœʁ], lit. 'SNCF Travelers') is a state-owned enterprise founded on 1 January 2020, an independent subsidiary of the French National Railway Company (SNCF), in charge of operating passenger trains.

Its predecessor is (partially) SNCF Mobilités EPIC which was founded on 1 January 2015.

== Business scope ==
Its first CEO is Christophe Fanichet. He was appointed by SNCF President Jean-Pierre Farandou.

Its divisions are:

- TGV-Intercités: operates trains in France and Europe, including the flagship TGV inOui high-speed rail service, the low-cost Ouigo rail service, and Intercités traditional long-distance services under public service obligation.
- TER: operates regional rail trains serving all the French regions, except Île-de-France.
- Transilien: operates RER and commuter rail network serving Île-de-France, the region surrounding and including the city of Paris.
- Industrial Operations: rolling stock engineering and maintenance.
- Passenger safety.
- SNCF Connect & Tech: includes the online travel agent SNCF Connect.

Additionally, SNCF Voyageurs oversees SNCF's investment in international high-speed service operators Eurostar and TGV Lyria.

== History ==
On 1 January 2020, the 3 EPIC companies and their subsidiaries became one state-owned group consisting of a parent company with its subsidiaries: SNCF Voyageurs, SNCF Réseau, Rail Logistics Europe, Keolis and Geodis. The previous SNCF Mobilité was dismantled. SNCF Gares & Connexions was integrated to the new SNCF Réseau company, while the logistics activities, rail freight (Geodis and FRET SNCF) and Keolis directly joined the parent company. The TGV inOui service, along with the low cost Ouigo TGV service, Intercités traditional long-distance services, TER, RER, Transilien regional services and the web site Oui.sncf became a new company named SNCF Voyageurs.
