= IDTGV =

iDTGV
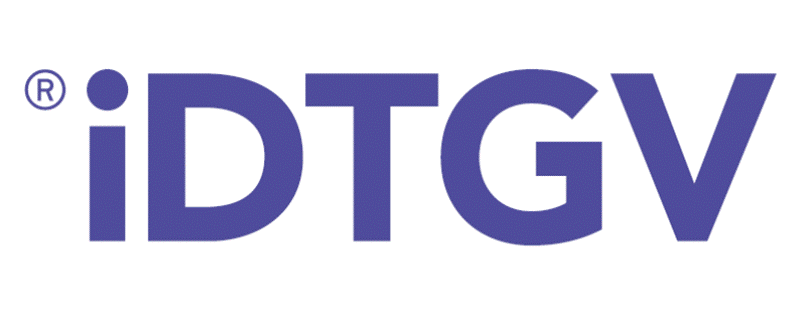

Overview
- Headquarters: Puteaux
- Locale: France
- Dates of operation: 2004–2017

Other
- Website: www.idtgv.com/en

iDTGV was a wholly owned subsidiary of the French state-owned train company SNCF, operating high-speed TGV services on multiple LGV lines throughout France. All trains run either to or from Paris, serving 12 French stations. Tickets can only be purchased online up to 6 months in advance.

The service was discontinued at the end of 2017 to be partially replaced by Ouigo.

== Concept ==
Tickets for iDTGV can only be purchased online. Each train comprises two different atmospheres, making for a more personalized journey. Booking for each train opens up 6 months before departure, with prices starting at €19 per person on all routes. Following booking, all services can be purchased online, frequently at a reduced cost to on the train itself.

== Ambience ==
Trains are separated into two carriage zones: iDzen and iDzap. iDzen, popular with business travelers, is for customers wishing a quiet trip, with mobile phones and loud conversations prohibited. iDzap is best suited to families or holidaymakers, with more leniency on noise and a bolder, more exciting atmosphere. Food is served at various intervals in the iDzap area. People travelling in first class have access to a power socket, as well as wider seats and more legroom.

== Services ==
Food is available onboard from a buffet car located in either carriages 4 or 14 depending on the train. In partnership with Navendis, iDTGV operates its own pre-booked taxi service called iDcab, serving the Île-de-France region. Tablets, offering a variety of films and games, can be rented along with headphones for a minimal sum. Seats can be chosen at any time during or after booking, however tickets must be reprinted each time any service is added or changed.

== Luggage ==
Luggage allowances on iDTGVs are stricter than on standard TGVs: each passenger is entitled to just 1 piece of hand luggage and 1 suitcase with their ticket. A baggage supplement of €35 applies to any additional bags, however this rises to €45 when paid upon boarding.
