= Rail Europe, Inc. =

European Rail and Train Provider Company

Rail Europe SAS
- Industry: Travel; Rail transport
- Founded: 1930
- Headquarters: Paris, France, France.,
- Key people: CEO: Björn Bender
- Website: www.raileurope.com

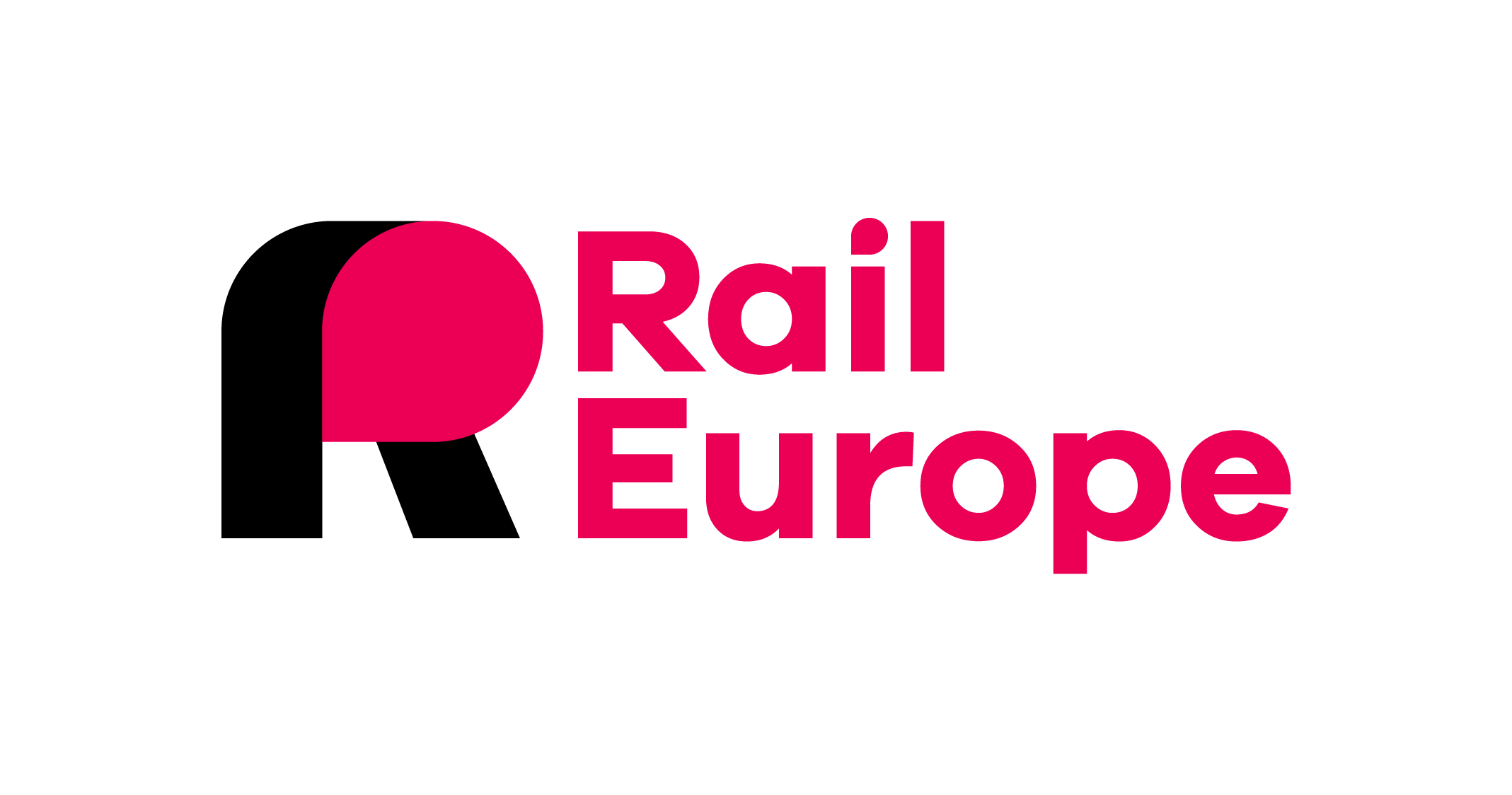

Rail Europe, SAS is a company that specializes in providing train tickets and rail passes for travel in Europe.

The company has a long history dating back to the 1930s and was built on the idea to make train travel in Europe more accessible to international travelers.

The company is headquartered in Paris, France, and has subsidiaries in London, UK; Melbourne, Australia; Mumbai, India; Shanghai, China and Florida, US.

Rail Europe offers a wide range of international high-speed train tickets including Eurostar, TGV, Italo, and Le Frecce. Tickets for local and regional trains in Europe are also available.

The company's catalogue of products focuses on European train operators such as SNCF, SBB, Eurostar, Thalys, Trenitalia, Italo, DB, Renfe, ÖBB, SNCB, NS, OUIGO Spain and National Rail, and rail passes including the Swiss Travel Pass and Eurail Passes.

== History ==
Rail Europe is doing business in North America since the 1930s. The French national rail operator (SNCF), along with its Swiss counterpart (CFF/SBB) and the Deutsche Reichsbahn, had representatives in the United States in the 1930s. Those operations were later subsumed into Rail Europe, Inc. in North America. In 1959, the company introduced the Eurail Pass to the North American market.

The Rail Europe office in Rosemont near Chicago had its origins in the German Railways' representation in North America.

The company expanded into Australasia in 1995. In the early 2000s, it continued to grow with representation in South America and South Africa, culminating in a new customer support team in Mumbai, India in 2010.

Rail Europe grew internationally by acquiring Rail Plus in Australia and New Zealand in 2016 and British train booking platform Loco2.com in 2017. Rail Europe became the international business unit of e.Voyageurs SNCF and No.1 distributor of train tickets and passes.

In March 2022, Rail Europe SAS became a private-owned company, no longer part of e.Voyageurs SNCF.

== Products and services ==
Rail Europe has built partnerships with many of the major train operators in Europe.

European travel products offered by Rail Europe were shaped around a 'catalog' of opportunities, for both B2B and B2C clients, ranging from Europe-HiSpeed to lesser services like Rhine Valley Train and Bavarian Castles and various EuroCity services. A dedicated Rail Europe team maintained this 'catalog' for many decades.

- Rail Passes - One of the company's most popular products is the Eurail pass, which allows travelers to explore up to 28 European countries by train. The pass comes in various options, including a global pass for unlimited travel and one-country passes for specific countries. From July 2023, traveler can also book the Eurail Greek Island Pass. In addition, Rail Europe also offers city-to-city train tickets, which allow travelers to travel between specific destinations without the need for a rail pass.
- Train Tickets - for one-way or round-trip train journeys from city-centre to city-centre. These paper tickets were in the main TCV tickets, which in the 1980s were reasonably priced, but by 2000 were no longer a viable option, having been undercut by the fares available on European rail operators' own websites.
- Print at home e-tickets for a limited number of city pairs.
- Seat Reservations - mandatory for high-speed trains in France and Spain and made available to rail pass holders at "passholder" rates.
- Sleeping Accommodation, viz. couchettes and sleeping berths - available on some overnight trains.
- High-speed trains such as Thalys or Eurostar.
- Sightseeing Tours
- Group Fares: Rail Europe is known for its services for group travelers.
