= SNCF Connect =

Travel and holiday companies of France

- Type: Private
- Founded: June 15, 2000; 26 years ago
- Headquarters: Saint-Denis, France
- Area served: Europe
- Key people: Fanichet Christophe, Pruvot Anne
- Revenue: €265 million (2024)
- Parent: SNCF
- Website: www.sncf-connect.com

SNCF Connect (formerly Voyages-sncf.com, then OUI.sncf until 25 January 2022) is a website and application offering an all-in-one sustainable mobility service, designed and developed by SNCF Connect & Tech, a private subsidiary of SNCF Voyageurs. It is also the leading e-commerce site for train ticket sales in France, the second-largest online tourism website, and the top French e-commerce website.

== History ==
=== SNCF's digital shift (1997–2000) ===
SNCF began its digital transition in 1997 with the launch of the sncf.fr website, initially limited to consulting timetables and fares. Online booking was introduced in 1998, followed by the option of paying directly on the site in June 1999. This activity generated a turnover of 150 million francs (approximately €22.9 million or £19.6 million) in its first full year of operation.

In light of this success, the company created the subsidiary Voyages-sncf.com in 2000 to centralise its online sales activities, at a time when Internet access remained limited in France. The platform quickly began offering national and international services (Eurostar, Thalys) and introduced home delivery of tickets.

=== Diversification and development (2001–2003) ===
Shortly after its creation, Voyages-sncf.com partnered with Expedia, then the leading travel website in the United States, which acquired a 47% stake in the company. This partnership transformed the site into a general travel agency, now selling airline tickets, car rentals and holiday packages. This strategy enabled Voyages-sncf.com to become, in the early 2000s, the most visited e-commerce site in France.

=== Innovation and paperless ticketing (2003–2015) ===
As early as 2003, Voyages-sncf.com innovated by allowing customers to order and print tickets at home, a first in e-commerce. The platform continued this digital transformation: a pioneer on mobile from 2007, it rolled out paperless tickets across the board in 2009. This period was marked by the launch of numerous tools: the "V." app in December 2009 for booking and managing journeys (buying, cancelling or exchanging train tickets, checking timetables, placing options on bookings), "Petits voyages entre amis" (Little Trips Among Friends) in October 2011 for collaborative trip planning, and the "Hôtel Voyages-SNCF" app in March 2013 for booking hotels, which became "Agence Voyages-SNCF" in 2015. Also in 2013, the "M-billet" (mobile train ticket) was deployed on 80% of TGV and Intercités routes and synced within the "V." mobile app. At the same time, the company expanded into China and Russia in 2015.

=== Digital expansion and transition to OUI.sncf (2016–2021) ===
In early 2016, the "V." app passed the milestone of 15 million downloads, became available in 90 countries and offered a dedicated extension for Android smartwatches and the Apple Watch. Mobile then accounted for 63% of the group's audience and one in three transactions. That same year, Voyages-sncf.com integrated Facebook Messenger into its customer service, allowing users, among other things, to access detailed booking information or ask questions about the services on offer.

In July 2017, to strengthen its presence in the British market and benefit from its technological and customer experience expertise, Voyages-sncf.com acquired the British start-up Loco2, founded in 2012. In December 2017, Voyages-sncf.com became OUI.sncf.

In 2018, to position itself in the conversational commerce market, the "Ouibot" chatbot was launched. Its aim was to support customers with their online purchases, notably enabling Max Jeune subscribers to book their tickets quickly via Facebook Messenger and WhatsApp. In June 2018, the "Assistant SNCF" app was launched to help customers with their journeys by aggregating complementary options such as bicycle or car hire.

In April 2019, OUI.sncf partnered with Cdiscount for its dedicated "Cdiscount Voyages" offer.

In January 2021, Anne Pruvot was appointed CEO of e.Voyageurs (the digital subsidiary of SNCF Voyageurs, which became SNCF Connect & Tech in January 2022).

=== The SNCF Connect era and multimodality (2022–present) ===
On 25 January 2022, OUI.sncf became SNCF Connect. Designed as a door-to-door journey planner, the new app allows users to book train tickets, but also car-sharing options and public transport via an integrated search engine.

Its technical and commercial development continued with:

- Payments and services: integration of Apple Pay (August 2022), the Chèque-Vacances Connect (November 2022) and PayPal (March 2026).
- User experience: launch of the "Rétrainspective" (late 2022), inspired by Spotify Wrapped. Each user receives a personalised review of their year, including the number of kilometres travelled, the CO₂ emissions avoided, their favourite destination, and more.
- Smartphone use: since 2024, it has been possible to buy and top up the Navigo pass via smartphone (NFC technology). The phone can also act as a carrier for IDFM travel passes and validate a ticket at access gates.
- User experience and accessibility: the option to activate a "step-free" filter (to make travel easier for people with reduced mobility and to plan a route to platforms on the level or via a lift); the option to activate a "full train" alert to be notified if a seat becomes available on the desired journey; various ticket-pricing features, including the fare-lock option, price and booking alerts, free exchange flexibility, and a price calendar to identify the most affordable dates; optimisation of connection times through in-station guides and access routes, the option to extend connection times up to 2 hours 30 minutes, and the ability to book a hotel directly on the platform.
- Multimodality: a partnership with Accor in May 2024, whose ALL booking platform is available directly from the website and app to offer a "train + hotel" package (3,000 hotels available across Europe, including 1,700 in France); partnerships in early 2025 with Uber and Avis, whose services are included directly within the SNCF Connect app, thereby enhancing its multimodal offering with private-hire vehicles.

Today, SNCF Connect offers a comprehensive multimodal service, with tickets purchased and stored via smartphone for a range of transport modes: trains, buses, coaches, public transport (in the Île-de-France region and around thirty urban areas), taxis and private-hire vehicles, and car hire. These various transport modes allow travellers to plan their entire journey, from departure to final destination.

The app distributes the carriers and services of the following entities: all SNCF Voyageurs offers (such as TGV INOUI, TER, OUIGO, Intercités, Eurostar, etc.), public transport in the Île-de-France region and in several French urban areas, coach journeys with BlaBlaCar and FlixBus, listed hotels, a car-hire company and car-sharing services.

=== Rebranding ===
In June 2017, the chairman of SNCF, Guillaume Pepy, announced the renaming of Voyages-sncf.com, which was to become OUI.sncf a few months later. This announcement coincided with the launch of two high-speed lines, Atlantique and Ouest, inaugurated in July: Paris–Rennes and Paris–Bordeaux.

It was thus under the OUI.sncf banner that TGV offers were also rebranded as "TGV inOui" (a premium offer) and "Ouigo" (a low-cost offer), along with all commercial services likewise bearing the "Oui" label, such as OuiCar (bought by Turo in 2022) or Ouibus (which became BlaBlaCar Bus and is still sold by SNCF Connect).

The switch from voyages-sncf.com to OUI.sncf took place on 6 December 2017, between three and four o'clock in the morning (UTC+01:00). 500,000 web pages were migrated and 20,000 pages were substantially overhauled. The update was carried out first on one of the site's two data centres (located in Lille and Saint-Denis), then on the other.

The service name uses the .sncf top-level domain acquired in June 2015, and marked its first genuine use. The "oui.com" domain name, belonging to the German clothing brand Oui, was not bought given the sum that would have had to be spent.

The brand was broken down as follows:

- voyages-sncf.com is a distributor for SNCF and has a European reach, with fifteen websites and mobile sites in eight languages, deployed across several countries;
- voyages-sncf.com became Oui.sncf, and V. Pro became Oui Pro. V. Pro was launched in 2016;
- ACT574, the Oui.sncf start-up accelerator;
- #OpenVSC became Oui Talk, a blog and co-creation platform.

In January 2022, the chairman of SNCF Voyageurs, Christophe Fanichet, announced the merger of the Oui.sncf sales platform and the Assistant SNCF app, which provides information on the state of traffic, through the creation of a new website and a new mobile app: SNCF Connect. The initial feedback on the app, which many users still considered a work in progress, led the chairman of SNCF, Jean-Pierre Farandou, to speak to the media to reassure customers and announce forthcoming improvements.

In November 2023, the "Customer Service of the Year 2024" award in the booking platform category was given to the SNCF Connect app. This gave customers who had been burned by the app's mishaps a field day on X (Twitter), mocking the awarding of this accolade.

== Organisation ==
SNCF Connect is a digital mobility service designed and operated by SNCF Connect & Tech, which brings together 1,300 employees in Lille, Nantes and Saint-Denis.

== Slogan ==
- 2002: "L'hypervoyage" (Hypertravel)
- 2005–2006: "Plus loin que vous ne l'imaginez" (Further than you imagine)
- 2018: "Libère vos envies de voyage" (Set your travel desires free)

== Figures ==
According to a Médiamétrie/NetRatings study, voyages-sncf.com was the leading travel website in France, with six million unique visitors in November 2015.

Financial Data
Year	2004	2007	2008	2009	2010	2011	2012	2013	2014	2015	2016	2017	2018	2021	2022	2023	2024	2025
Revenue (€ billions)																	0,258	
Gross Merchandise Value (€ billions)	0,784	1,86	1,98	2,4	2,8	3,2	3,6	4	4,2	4,32	4,1	4,6	4,8					
Website visits (billions)																1,3	1,5	1,65
Online transactions (millions)	11,1	25	-	-	-	-	-	-	-	-	-					15,5	16,5	20
Tickets sold (millions)	-	38	54	55	-	-	68	75	78	83	86	99	110		190		226	233
Mobile tickets sold (millions)	-	-	-	-	-	2	4	7	10	18								
Share of SNCF sales	12,2 %	25 %	27 %	29 %	36 %	-	-	-	-	-								
Travel agency sales (€ millions)	135,2	-	246	235	-	-	-	-	-	-								
Employees	100	200	225	-	-	-	-	-	950	1000	1200							1300

== Criticisms ==
=== Outages ===
The website has seen several outages in its history, which were criticized in French media in 2009.

=== Anti-competitive behavior ===
On 5 February 2009, SNCF was fined € 5 million by the French Conseil de la concurrence for "giving a preferential treatment to its subsidiary voyages-sncf.com, created with the American online travel agency Expedia". SNCF did not appeal the decision, but Expedia did.

=== Gender on tickets ===
In 2021, SNCF Connect was sued by Mousse and Stop Homophobie and 64 passengers for not having gender-neutral options when booking tickets, only monsieur and madame. SNCF defended the limited options, saying "French society [was] not yet ready for such a change," and that mandating a third option was attacking "French universalism." The case reached the French State Council in the summer of 2023. The case was then seen by the EU's Court of Justice in November 2023. In 2025, SNCF lost the case, with the EU ruling that having only two options was not "objectively indispensable" to getting on a train.

== See also ==
SNCF Connect has the status of travel agency, like its competitors such as:

- Kombo (company)
- Trainline EU
