= SNCF =

National state-owned railway company of France

Société nationale des chemins de fer français

- Map of the French railways on which the TGV (high speed tracks: blue; normal tracks: black) and Intercités (grey) SNCF trains run

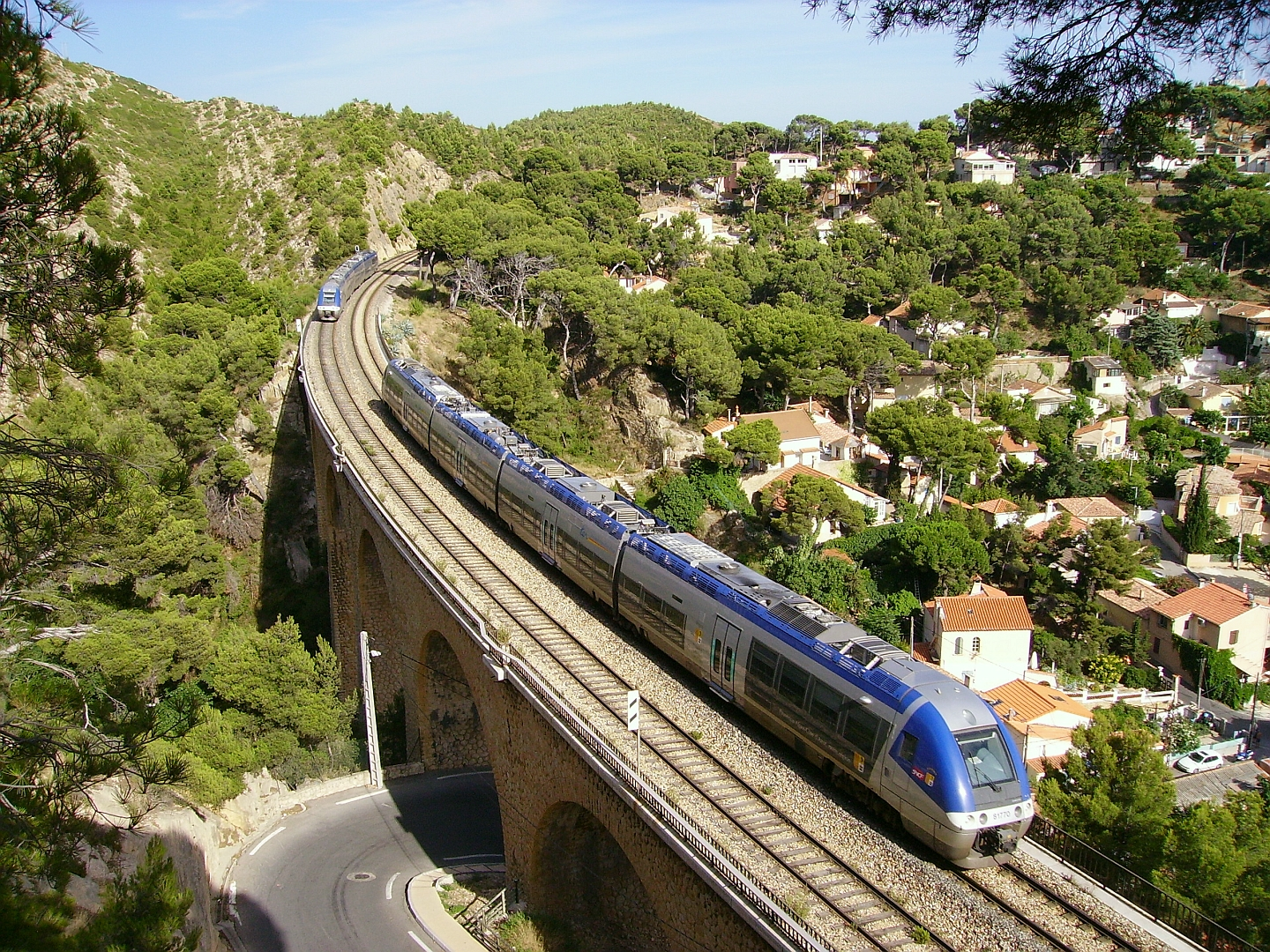
- TER PACA service west of Marseille

Overview
- Headquarters: Saint-Denis, France
- Reporting mark: TGV, Intercités, TER, Transilien, Ouigo, Eurostar, TGV Lyria
- Locale: France
- Dates of operation: 1938–present
- Predecessor: Compagnie des chemins de fer du Nord; Administration des chemins de fer d'Alsace et de Lorraine; Compagnie des chemins de fer de Paris à Lyon et à la Méditerranée; Compagnie du chemin de fer de Paris à Orléans; Compagnie des chemins de fer du Midi et du Canal latéral à la Garonne; Compagnie des chemins de fer de l'Est; Administration des chemins de fer de l'État

Technical
- Track gauge: 1,435 mm (4 ft 8 1/2 in) and 1,000 mm (3 ft 3 3/8 in)
- Length: 29,273 km (18,189 mi)

Other
- Website: www.groupe-sncf.com

Société nationale des chemins de fer français (SNCF)
- Type: State-owned société anonyme EPIC between 1983 and 2019
- Industry: Rail transport
- Founded: 1 January 1938; 88 years ago
- Founder: Government of France
- Headquarters: Saint-Denis, France
- Key people: Jean Castex (president of SNCF Group)
- Revenue: ▲€41.4 billion (2022)
- Operating income: ▲€3.3 billion (2022)
- Net income: ▲€2.5 billion (2022)
- Total assets: ▲€133.0 billion (2022)
- Total equity: ▲€27.6 billion (2022)
- Owner: French state
- Number of employees: 270,296 (2021)
- Subsidiaries: SNCF Réseau; SNCF Gares & Connexions; SNCF Voyageurs; Eurostar Group; Rail Logistics Europe; Hexafret; Captrain; VIIA; Naviland Cargo; Forwardis; Geodis; Keolis

The Société nationale des chemins de fer français ([sɔsjete nɑsjɔnal de ʃ(ə)mɛ̃ d(ə) fɛʁ fʁɑ̃sɛ], lit. 'National Company of the French Railways', SNCF [ɛsɛnseɛf]) is France's state-owned railway operator. Becoming effective on 1 January 1938 following an agreement on 31 August 1937 between the government, private railway companies and railway labor unions, it operates nearly all rail transport in France and Monaco, including the TGV, on France's high-speed rail network. Its functions include operation of railway services for passengers and freight (through its subsidiaries SNCF Voyageurs and Rail Logistics Europe), as well as railway infrastructure management (SNCF Réseau). The railway network consists of about 35,000 km (22,000 mi) of route, of which 2,600 km (1,600 mi) are high-speed lines and 14,500 km (9,000 mi) electrified. More than 14,000 trains are operated daily.

In 2010, the SNCF was ranked 22nd in France and 214th globally on the Fortune Global 500 list. It is the main business of the SNCF Group, which in 2020 had €30 billion of sales in 120 countries. The SNCF Group employs more than 275,000 employees in France and around the world. Since July 2013, the SNCF Group headquarters are located in a Parisian suburb at 2 Place aux Étoiles in Saint-Denis. The president of SNCF Group has been Jean Castex since 2025.

== Business scope ==
=== High-speed rail ===
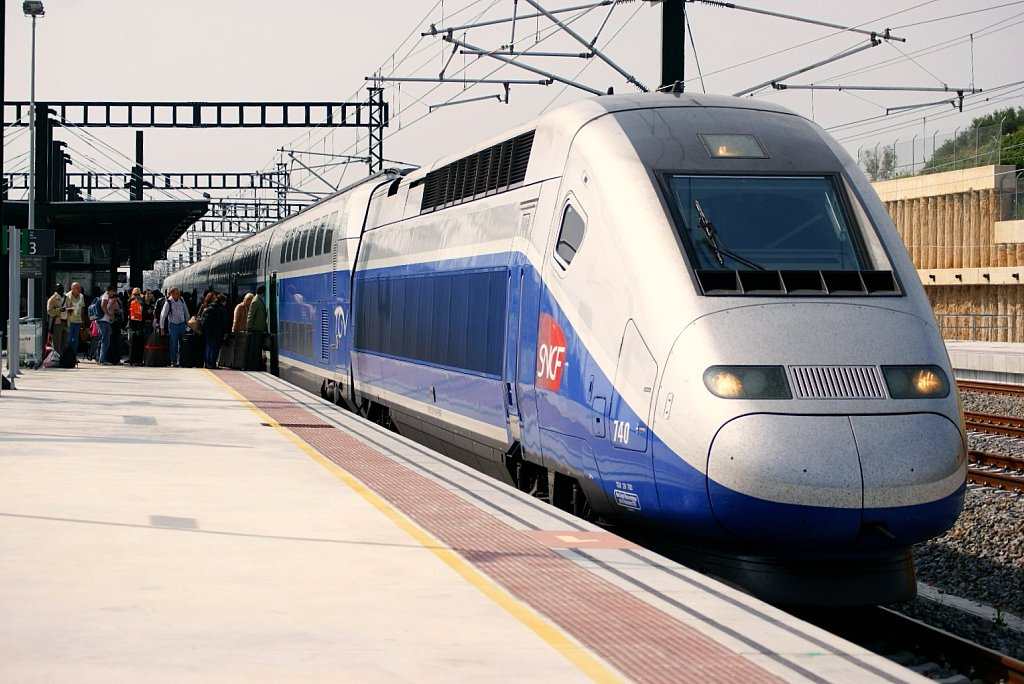
A high-speed train TGV Duplex from the SNCF

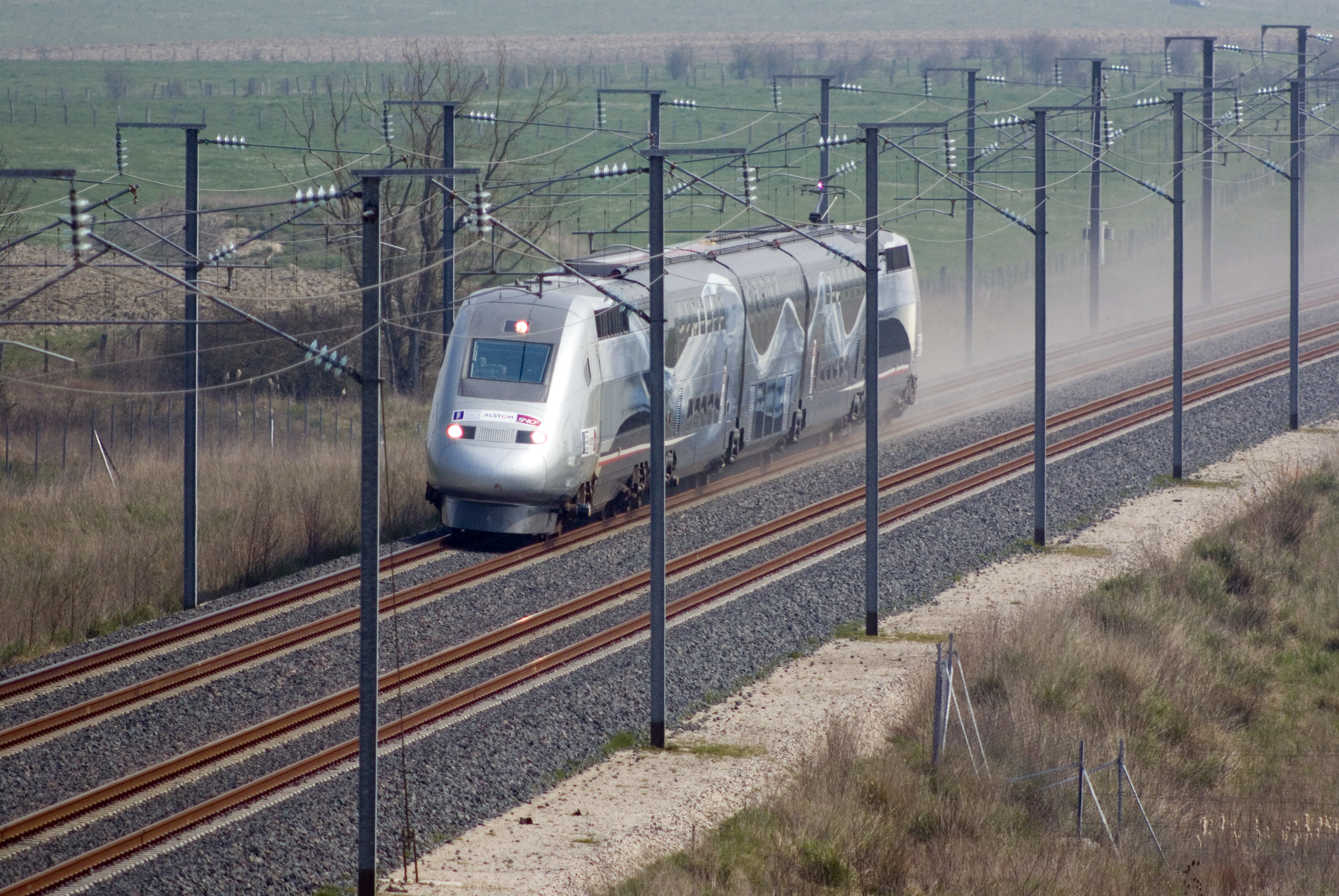
TGV 4402 operation V150 reaching 574 km/h (357 mph) on 3 April 2007 near Le Chemin

SNCF operates almost all of France's railway traffic, including the TGV (Train à Grande Vitesse, meaning "high-speed train"). In the 1970s, the SNCF began the TGV high-speed train program with the intention of creating the world's fastest railway network. It came to fruition in 1981 with the completion of the first high-speed line LGV Sud-Est ("Ligne à Grande Vitesse Sud-Est", meaning "southeast high-speed line"), where the first TGV service, from Paris to Lyon, was inaugurated. In 2017, the national rail network owned by SNCF Réseau had 28,710 km (17,839 mi) of lines, 58% of which were electrified and 2,640 high-speed lines. Every day, the SNCF runs 15,000 commercial trains and transports more than 5 million passengers and more than 250,000 tonnes of goods. TGV lines and TGV technology are now spread across several European countries.

The SNCF's TGV has set many world speed records, the most recent on 3 April 2007, when a new version of the TGV dubbed the V150 with larger wheels than the usual TGV, was able to cover more ground with each rotation and had a stronger 18,600-kilowatt (24,900-horsepower) engine, and broke the world speed record for conventional railway trains, reaching 574.8 km/h (357.2 mph).

The SNCF has a remarkable safety record. After nearly 30 years in operation, SNCF's TGV system has only experienced one fatal accident, which occurred during pre-opening testing and not in regular operation.

=== United Kingdom ===
In 2011, SNCF in partnership with Keolis, unsuccessfully bid for the InterCity West Coast franchise. In April 2017 SNCF took a 30% shareholding in a joint venture with Stagecoach Group and Virgin Group to bid for the West Coast Partnership that will operate services on the West Coast Main Line from May 2020 and the High Speed 2 line from 2026.

In April 2019, Stagecoach were banned from bidding for any franchises including the West Coast Partnership which has meant that Virgin and SNCF have now had to withdraw from the shortlist.

=== SNCF operations ===
Since the 1990s, SNCF has been selling railway carriages to regional governments, with the creation of the Train Express Régional brand. SNCF also maintains a broad scope of international business that includes work on freight lines, inter-city lines and commuter lines. SNCF experts provide logistics, design, construction, operations and maintenance services. SNCF operates the international ticketing agency SNCF Connect, formerly oui.sncf/Voyages-sncf.com and Rail Europe, previously Loco 2.

SNCF has employees in 120 countries offering extensive overseas and cross border consulting. Those projects include

- Israel: Assistance and Training. SNCF International provides assistance to Israel Railways in every area of rail operations including projects to upgrade the network's general safety regulations. Other assistance and training programmes involve Infrastructure and the Traction Division.
- Taiwan: Operations Training. SNCF supervised the prime contractor responsible for construction of the Taiwan Railways Administration's main high-speed rail line. It also trained rail traffic controllers, drivers, and crew members. On behalf of the Government of Taiwan, SNCF managed the high-speed railway Command Control Centre.
- United Kingdom: Maintenance. In 2007–2008, SNCF-International consultants audited the maintenance practices applied to the track, signalling and overhead electric power line on British high-speed rail lines connecting London to the Channel Tunnel. In addition, it conducted an audit of the maintainer's performance from the service quality and cost control standpoint, made recommendations for improvements, and proposed a three-year Business Plan.
- South Korea: HSR Electrification Design. SNCF advised Korean Railroads on the electrification of tracks between Daegu and Busan and on linking existing conventional tracks to the new high-speed line. SNCF also assisted in selecting and inspecting high-speed rolling stock and trained 400 senior manager, engineers, and executives in a broad range of skills, including signalling, catenaries, track, rolling stock maintenance, HSR operation, safety management, marketing, and passenger information systems. Until the end of 2009, SNCF assisted Korea in maintaining its high-speed.
- Spain: Signalling System. SNCF partnered with ADIF (Spanish railway infrastructure provider) in the study, supply, installation, and maintenance of the standard EU railway signaling system along the Madrid-Lleida high-speed line. On behalf of the Spanish Government, SNCF designed and led maintenance operations on this line over a two-year period.
- France: Lead Infrastructure and Rolling Stock Maintainer – The SNCF maintains 32,000 km (20,000 mi) of track, 26,500 main sets of points and crossings, 2,300 signal boxes, 80,000 track circuits, over 1 million relays, etc. It also maintains 3,900 locomotives and 500 high-speed trains. Each of SNCF's TGV trains travels more than 39,000 km (24,000 mi) a month – enough to circle the globe. Each year SNCF's Human Resources Department provides over 1.2 million hours of training to its over 25,000 employees.
- Morocco: Design, construction and operations for the Al Boraq bullet train service between Tangier and Casablanca

== History ==
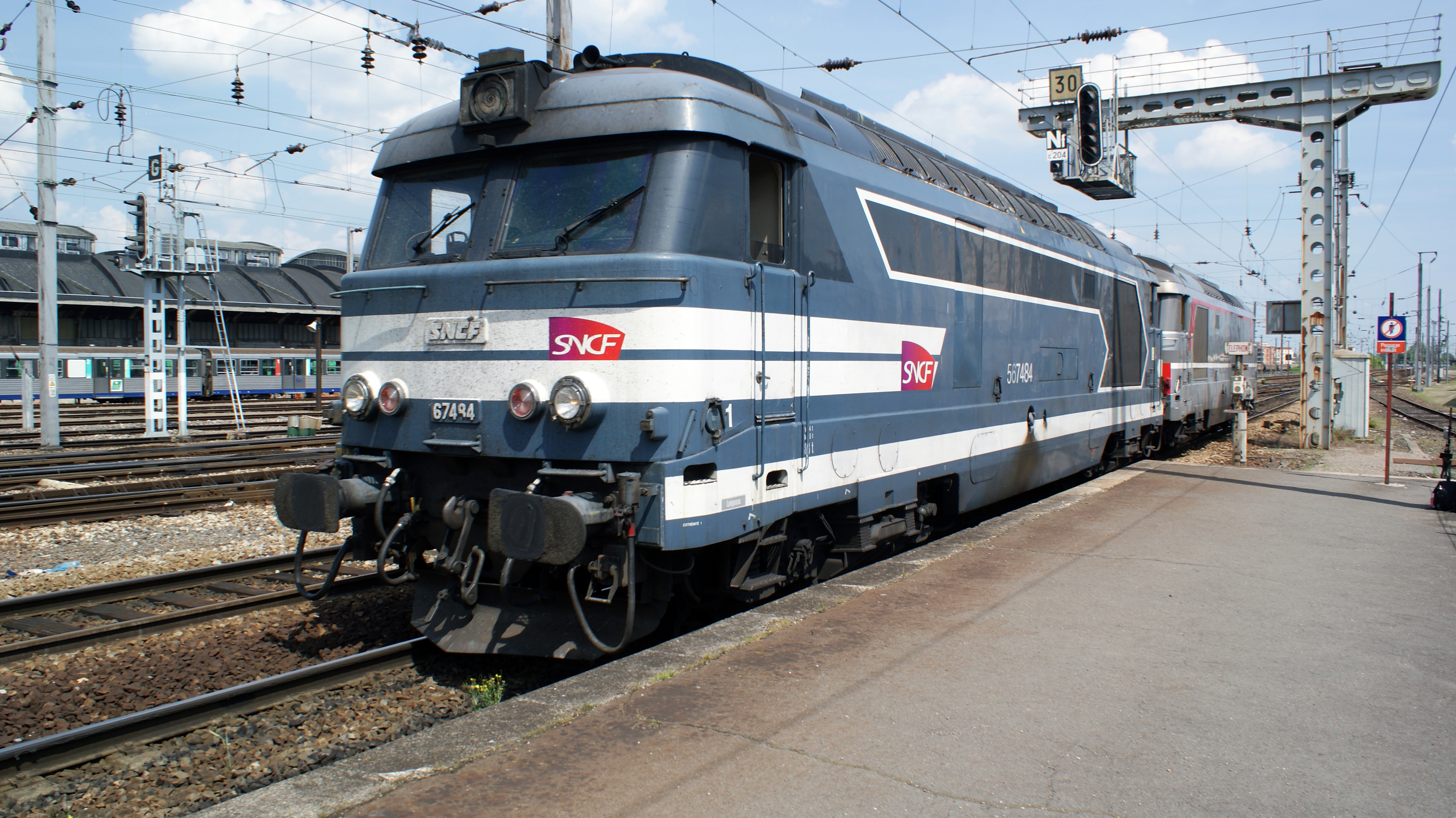
SNCF Class BB 67400 diesel locomotive at Amiens station

SNCF was formed in 1938 with the nationalisation of France's main railway companies (Chemin de fer, literally, 'way of iron', means railway). These were the:

- Chemins de fer de l'Est (Est, Eastern Railways)
- Chemins de fer de l'État (État, State Railways; merged in 1908 with the Chemins de fer de l'Ouest, Western Railways)
- Chemins de fer du Nord (Nord, Northern Railways)
- Chemins de fer de Paris à Lyon et à la Méditerranée (PLM, Paris, Lyon and Mediterranean Railways)
- Chemins de fer de Paris à Orléans et du Midi (Paris, Orléans and Southern Railways; PO-Midi, formed in 1934 from the merger of the Chemin de fer de Paris à Orléans and the Chemins de fer du Midi)
- Administration des chemins de fer d'Alsace et de Lorraine (AL, Alsace-Lorraine Railways)
- Syndicats du Chemin de fer de Grande Ceinture et de Petite Ceinture (Great and Small Belt Railways) in Paris and its suburbs.

The French state originally took 51% ownership of SNCF. For a period of 45 years (until 1 January 1983), the other 49% belonged to shareholders of financial companies that succeeded the former companies. Since then, SNCF is wholly owned by the French state. The state invested large amounts of public subsidies into the system.

=== World War II ===
Following the Armistice of 22 June 1940 until August 1944, SNCF was requisitioned for the transport of Wehrmacht forces and armaments. The invading German troops had destroyed nearly 350 French railway bridges and tunnels. According to differing estimates, SNCF surrendered between 125,000 and 213,000 wagons and 1,000–2,000 locomotives.

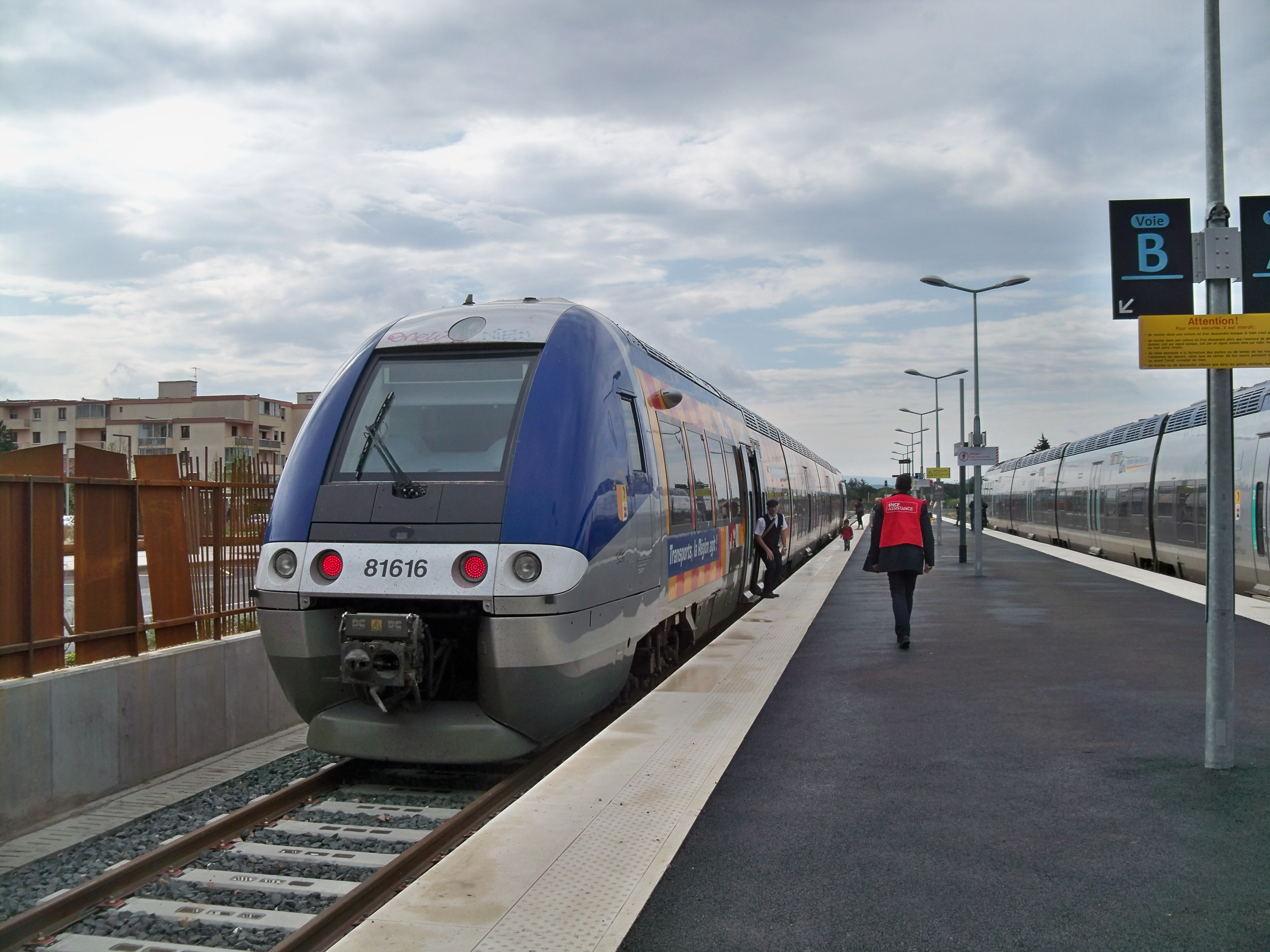
A SNCF TER Provence-Alpes-Côte-d'Azur train in Carpentras

France's railway infrastructure and rolling stocks were a target for the French Resistance aimed at disrupting and fighting the German occupying forces. This allowed SNCF employees to perform many acts of resistance, including the formation of the Résistance-Fer movement in 1943. Nearly 1,700 SNCF railway workers were killed or deported for resisting Nazi orders. 150 Résistance-Fer agents were shot for their acts of resistance, 500 of them were deported. Half of those deported died in concentration camps.

During the Holocaust in France, German occupying forces in France also requisitioned SNCF to transport nearly 77,000 Jews and other Holocaust victims to Nazi extermination camps. Later, these deportations were the subject of historical controversy and lawsuits (such as the Lipietz case) in France as well as in the United States (where subsidiary Keolis is (as of 2010) a transportation contractor) to the present day.

In 1992, SNCF commissioned French academics to write a history of SNCF activities during World War II. The resultant report was published in 1996.

In 2006, some sources claimed that SNCF billed Nazi-occupied France for third-class tickets for Holocaust victims transported to extermination camps, although passengers were transported in cattle cars. In 2003, a source reported that after the liberation of France SNCF continued to seek payment for transporting Holocaust victims to Germany. However, historian Michael Marrus has written that claims that SNCF billed for third-class tickets and continued to seek payment after the war ended were made as part of a legal case brought against SNCF, and did not match with historians' understanding of what happened. Marrus argues that SNCF had no margin of maneuver during the German occupation and that the actions of SNCF employees were not ideologically motivated. According to Serge Klarsfeld, president of the organization Sons and Daughters of Jewish Deportees from France, SNCF was forced by German and Vichy authorities to cooperate in providing transport for French Jews to the border and did not make any profit from this transport.

In December 2014, SNCF agreed to pay up to $60 million worth of compensation to Holocaust survivors in the United States. It corresponds to approximately $100,000 per survivor.

=== Modern era ===
In the early 2000s, SNCF sought to get a contract from the state of California for a bullet train project between Los Angeles and San Francisco. SNCF recommended that the train take the most direct route between the two locations to reduce the complexity and cost of the project, but the SNCF's recommendations were cast aside by California politicians who wanted to divert the train through various communities, raising the cost and complexity of the project, as well as the expected travel time. SNCF pulled out of the project in 2011 and went to Morocco to help the country construct a bullet train service. By 2018, Morocco's bullet train started service while the California bullet train project was not close to being operational in 2022, with some saying that the project would never be completed.

In May 2014, the company had discovered that 2,000 new trains they ordered at a cost of 15 billion euros were too wide for many of France's regional platforms. Construction work started to reconfigure them.

On 1 January 2015, Réseau Ferré de France (RFF) merged with SNCF Infra and the Direction de la circulation ferroviaire (DCF) and became SNCF Réseau, the operational assets of SNCF became SNCF Mobilités, and both groups were placed under the control of SNCF.

Jean-Pierre Farandou, then head of the state-owned railway operator, informed on 26 July 2024 that SNCF's high-speed rail network Eurostar suffered from multiple instances of coordinated sabotage, causing significant disruptions to train services. The incident occurred just hours before the opening ceremony of the Olympics, which was considered a high-risk event. The affected lines were located in the western, northern, and eastern regions of France, impacting not only domestic trains but also those travelling to neighboring Belgium and London via the Channel Tunnel. It was expected that roughly 800,000 travellers were impacted because of this arson attack on French railway networks.

=== Design ===
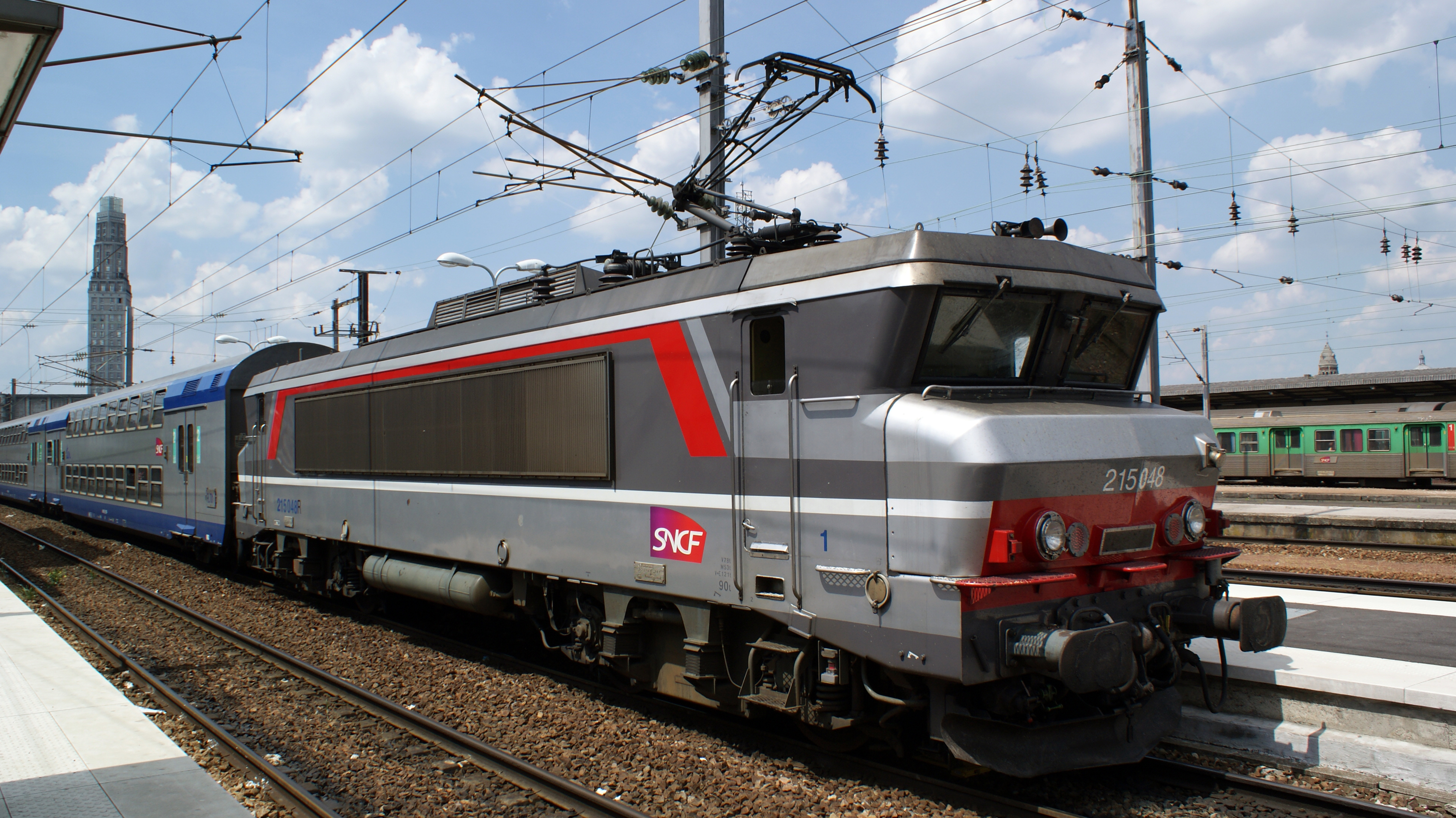
A "broken nose" style of SNCF electric locomotive (BB 15000) designed by Paul Arzens

The industrial designer Paul Arzens styled many of SNCF's locomotives from the 1940s until the 1970s. A particularly distinctive type is the "broken nose" style of electric and diesel locomotives.

== Codeshare with airlines ==
SNCF has codeshare agreements with the following airlines:

- Air Austral
- Air France
- Air Tahiti Nui
- American Airlines
- Cathay Pacific
- FrenchBee
- Middle East Airlines
- Emirates
- Etihad Airways
- Qatar Airways
- SriLankan Airlines

In exchange, SNCF allows passengers on these flights to book railway services between Charles de Gaulle Airport in Roissy (in Paris's suburbs) and Aix-en-Provence, Angers, Avignon, Bordeaux, Le Mans, Lille, Lyon Part-Dieu, Marseille, Montpellier, Nantes, Nîmes, Poitiers, Rennes, Strasbourg, Tours, and Valence with their airline. The IATA designator used by airlines in connection with these journeys is 2C.

Continental Airlines discontinued its codeshare with SNCF on 15 August 2010.

== Company structure ==
=== Headquarters ===
Current head office in Saint-Denis

The SNCF's former headquarters in the Montparnasse neighborhood

Until 1999, the SNCF's historic headquarters was located at 88 Rue Saint-Lazare in the 9th arrondissement. In 1996 the chairman of SNCF, Louis Gallois, announced that SNCF would move its headquarters to a new location during the middle of 1997.

From 1999 to 2013, SNCF's headquarters were located in the Montparnasse neighborhood of the 14th arrondissement of Paris, located near the Gare Montparnasse.

Since July 2013, the SNCF headquarters are located in the Parisian suburb of Saint-Denis at 2, place aux Étoiles, 93200 Saint Denis. The move was motivated by cutting operating costs by 10 million euros per year.

=== Divisions ===
Since 1 January 2020 SNCF is a state-owned group consisting of a parent company (SNCF) with several independently operated subsidiaries:

- SNCF Réseau (French for SNCF Network) – State-owned railway infrastructure manager;
  - SNCF Gares & Connexions (French for SNCF Stations & Connections) – SNCF Réseau subsidiary responsible for the maintenance and renovation of the 3,000 stations on the French rail network;
- SNCF Voyageurs (English: SNCF Travelers) – State-owned enterprise that operates trains in France and Europe, including the flagship TGV inOui service, along with the low cost Ouigo TGV service, Intercités traditional long-distance services, and TER and Transilien regional services;
- Rail Logistics Europe;
  - Hexafret (former Fret SNCF) – rail freight services;
  - Technis - rolling stock maintenance;
  - Captrain – European rail freight network;
  - VIIA, Rolling highway;
  - Naviland Cargo;
  - Forwardis, freight forwarder;
- Geodis (98.4% owned by SNCF) – Private company that runs freight transportation logistics;
- Keolis (70% owned by SNCF) – Private public transport operator that runs services in cities across the world including bus, metro, light rail, rental bikes, carparks, cable cars and airport services.

=== Subsidiaries ===
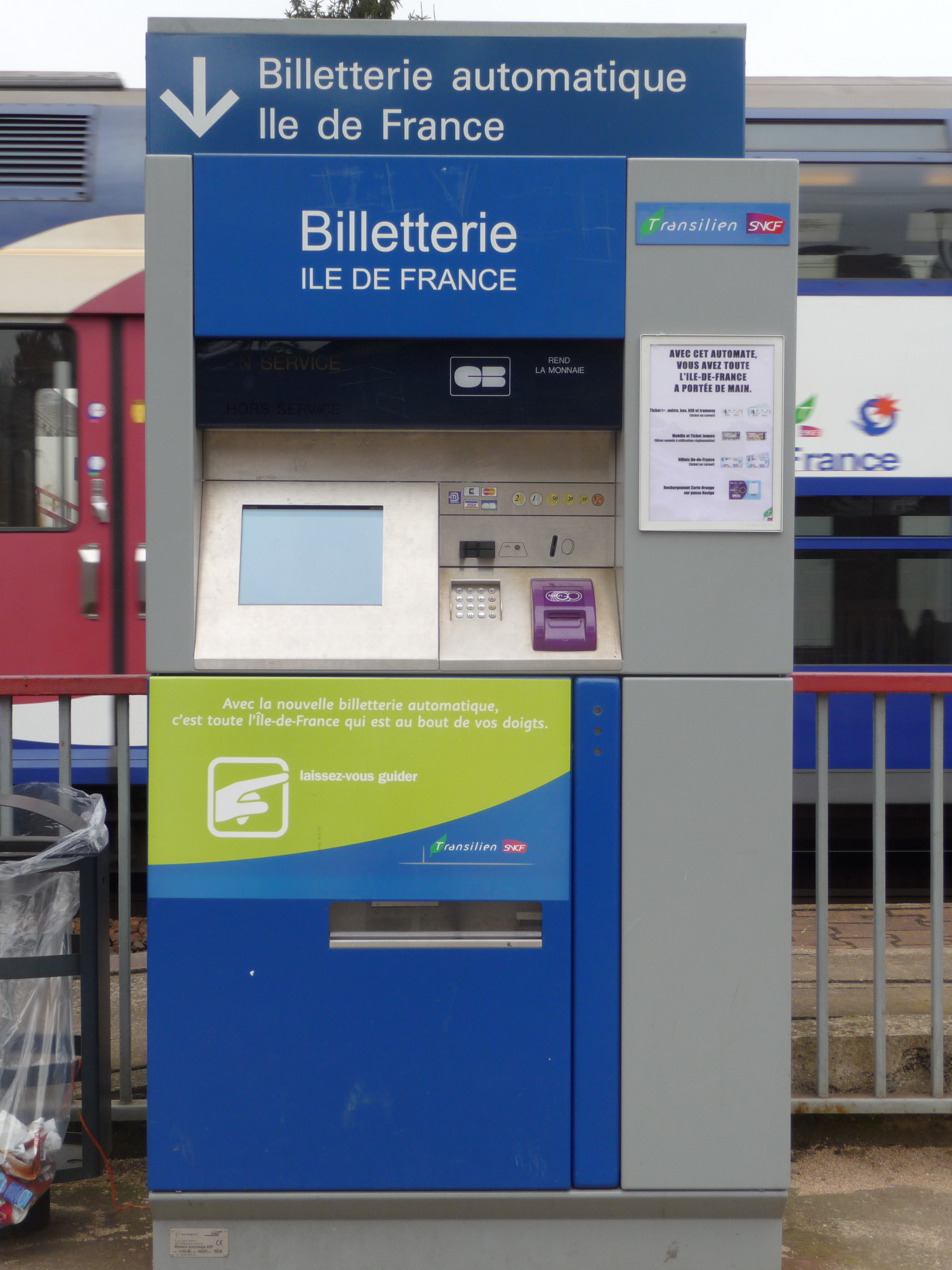
A SNCF ticket machine at the Épône-Mézières station

SNCF has full or partial shares in a large number of companies, the majority of which are rail or transport related. These include:

- ERMEWA (100%)
- France Wagons (100%)
- SGW : Société de Gérance de Wagons (67.5%)
- CTC : Compagnie des Transports Céréaliers (69.36%)
- SEGI (98.96%)
- Naviland Cargo (94.37%) previously CNC Transports, Compagnie Nouvelle de Conteneurs.

General freight transport:

- C-Modalohr Express (51%)
- Novatrans (38.25%)
- Districhrono (100%)
- Ecorail (99.9%)
- Froidcombi (48.93%)
- Rouch Intermodal (98.96%)
- Sefergie (98.96%)
- EFFIA (99.99%)

Passenger transport

- Eurostar International (55%)
- Lyria (74%): high-speed rail operator between France and Switzerland
- Rhealys SA (30%)
- Keolis (70%)
- Govia (24.5%)
- Ouigo (100%): low cost high-speed rail operator
- Ouigo España (100%): open-access high-speed rail operator in Spain

Tickets

- SNCF Connect (formerly oui.sncf) (50.1%), the on-line travel agency of SNCF
- Rail Europe, Inc. (50%) Bought from British Rail.
- GLe-trade

Consulting

- AREP (99.99%): architecture and urban design of stations and other railway facilities
- SNCF Consulting (100%)
- SNCF International (100%)
- Inexia
- SYSTRA (35.87%): engineering for public transport

Housing

- ICF Habitat Novedis (100%): rental housing (social and private housing)

== Company image ==
According to a TNS SOFRES survey published in 2010, 66% of French people have a good image of SNCF. At the end of 2019, this proportion was measured at 50% by the Posternak-Ifop barometer on the image of companies. In 2020, Eight Advisory and IFOP unveil their ranking of the "most admired French companies": SNCF is in 23rd position.

Safety on trains is also often a priority. To do this, around 2,800 railway workers form the Railway Security, the general supervision of SNCF, of which 50% of the workforce is assigned to the Île-de-France region.

Furthermore, the experts of the BCG, Boston Consulting Group, use to compare the rail systems in 25 European countries. They rank France in tied 4th position (with Germany, Austria and Sweden), behind Switzerland, Denmark and Finland. The criteria are: the utilization rate, quality of service and safety.

== Visual and sound identity ==
The first SNCF badge, created by Maximilien Vox, used from January 1938

Logo redesigned by Joël Desgrippes, used from December 1992 to March 2005

=== Logotype ===
SNCF's current visual logo was created in 2005 by the Carré Noir agency, a subsidiary of the Publicis communication group. It was slightly reworked in 2011: rounded corners, disappearance of shadows inside the letters as well as behind, and a clearer separation between them.

=== Sound identity ===
In 2005, the sound logo of the SNCF the four notes C – G – A♭ – E♭, in its sung version, was created by Michaël Boumendil and the agency Sixième Son.

David Gilmour, guitarist of the group Pink Floyd, used the jingle as the inspiration for the title track of his 2015 album Rattle That Lock. Simone Hérault has been the voice of the SNCF since 1981.

== Culture ==
=== Cinema ===
Since Auguste and Louis Lumière's first film, SNCF has been the company that hosts the most film shoots in France, between 50 and 60 shoots per year, which represents around two-thirds of French productions. A selection of iconic films where SNCF is at the heart of the matter includes:

- Hugo
- Mr. Bean's Holiday
- Mission: Impossible
- The Tourist

== See also ==
- Autorité de Régulation des Activités Ferroviaires
- Corail (train)
- Dirigisme
- History of rail transport in France
- List of French companies
- List of SNCF locomotive and multiple-unit classes
- List of SNCF stations
- Transport express régional
- Transport in France
- Réseau Ferré National
- Grigny to Corbeil-Essonnes line
