= Am 842 =

Am 842 (or SBB-CFF-FFS Am 842) is a Swiss railway locomotive designation, assigned to:

- MaK G 1204 BB
- Vossloh G1000 BB
