= Vossloh G1000 BB =

Diesel-hydraulic locomotive

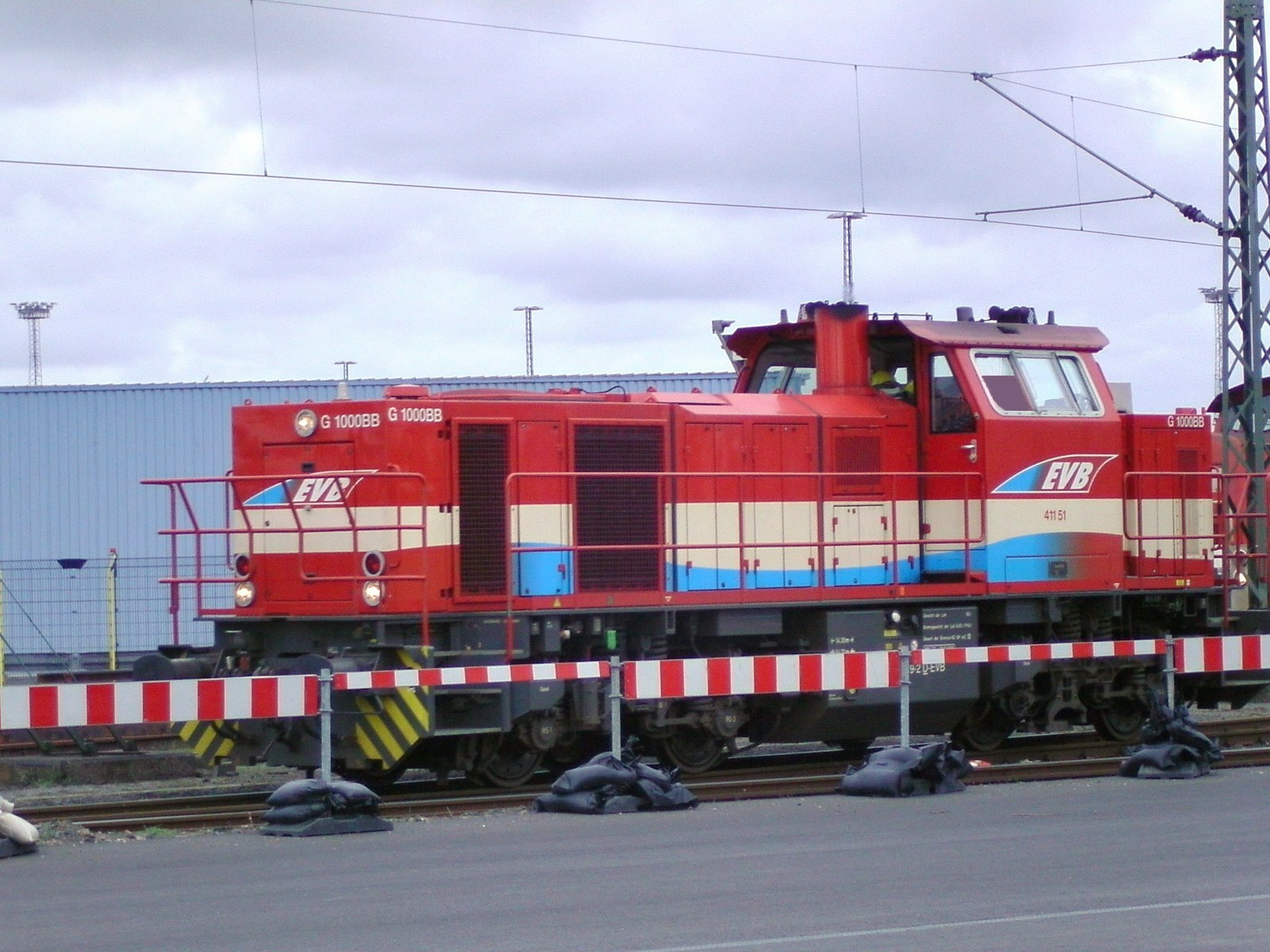
- EVB Vossloh G1000 BB in Bremerhaven (2010)
Type and origin
- Power type: Diesel
- Builder: Vossloh
- Build date: 2002–2016
- Total produced: 100
Specifications
- Configuration
  - UIC: B'B'
- Gauge: 1,435 mm (4 ft 8 1/2 in)
- Wheel diameter: 1,000 mm (39.37 in) (new)
- Minimum curve: 80 m (262 ft 6 in)
- Length: 14.130 m (46 ft 4.30 in)
- Width: 3.080 m (10 ft 1.26 in)
- Height: 4.225 m (13 ft 10.34 in)
- Loco weight: 80 tonnes (79 long tons; 88 short tons) (74.2 tonnes option)
- Fuel capacity: 3,000 L (660 imp gal; 790 US gal)
- Prime mover: MTU 8V 4000
- Transmission: Voith L4r4
Performance figures
- Maximum speed: 100 km/h (62 mph)
- Power output: 1,100 kW (1,500 hp)
- Tractive effort: starting 259 kN (58,000 lb_{f}) @ μ=0.33, 80 tonnes (79 long tons; 88 short tons)

The Vossloh G1000 BB is a class of off-centre cab diesel-hydraulic B'B' 4 axle locomotives built by Vossloh in Kiel since 2002. When operating under Swiss ownership the locomotives have received the class Am 842, several units owned by the Société Nationale des Chemins de Fer Luxembourgeois are classified as CFL class 1100.

== Design and specifications ==
The class is based upon the standard Vossloh locomotives design, and are a higher powered development of the Vossloh G800 BB which were produced mainly for the Austrian Federal Railways, with a 1.1 MW (1,500 hp) MTU engine replacing the 0.8 MW (1,100 hp) Caterpillar engine in the G800; as a result the front engine compartment is enlarged, whilst other features: bogie frame and overall dimensions remain the same.

The locomotives have been homologated for Germany, France, Italy and Switzerland.

== Operators ==
The main lessors of the locomotives are Angel Trains Cargo (now Alpha Trains) and Vossloh Locomotives. Mitsui Rail Capital and Northrail also lease locomotives.

In Germany several units are operated by Häfen und Güterverkehr Köln and Chemion Logistiks GmbH., Eisenbahnen und Verkehrsbetriebe Elbe-Weser (EVB) operates two units. Single units are operated by Siegener Kreisbahn and Managementgesellschaft für Hafen und Markt mbH (HFM) (Frankfurt,

Six units are operated by the Société Nationale des Chemins de Fer Luxembourgeois (CFL)

In Switzerland SBB Cargo has operated several of the class, and BLS Cargo one unit, where the locomotives are classified as type Am 842. A single unit is owned and operated by Tamoil (Switzerland) at the Raffinerie de Collombey.

In France EuroCargoRail (ECR) and Veolia Cargo France (since 2009 Europorte) both operate over 10 units, and COLAS Rail 2 units.

AKIEM/Société de Gestion et Valorisation de Matériel de Traction own 5 units for operation in Italy, since 2009 operated by Captrain Italia. Additionally Hupac S.p.A. (Italy) operates 3 units.

One unit is operated by Taraldsvik Maskin A/S in Norway.
