= Nicolas Perrin =

Swiss businessman

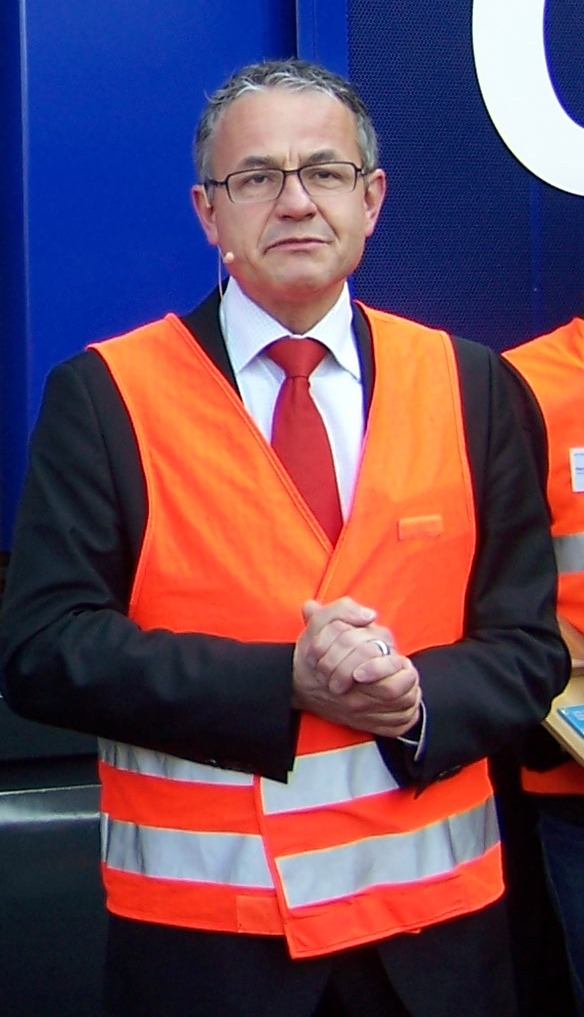
Nicolas Perrin in 2012

Nicolas Perrin (born 1959) is a Swiss businessman and former CEO of SBB Cargo between 2008 and 2020.

Perrin studied at ETH Zurich, Dept. II for Construction Engineering, where he gained a diploma. He is married and lives in Schaffhausen, Switzerland.

Perrin joined SBB-CFF-FFS in 1987. In the early 1990s, he worked as personal assistant to the President of the executive board before spending five years as Vice President of Service Planning for the Rail 2000 project. From 1999, Perrin served as acting deputy to the CEO of SBB Cargo. He began as Head of Production for the division, before moving on to manage SBB Cargo's International business area.

In summer 2007, Perrin became interim CEO of SBB Cargo following the departure of Daniel Nordmann. In December 2007, the SBB AG Board of Directors appointed him as the new CEO of SBB Cargo and member of the management board of SBB AG. His activities focused primarily on the sustainable and targeted redevelopment of SBB Cargo.

In 2019 he announced his resignation, leaving on 1 March 2020 to join the board of directors.
