= Dachser =

German logistic company

DACHSER Group SE & Co. KG
- Industry: Logistics
- Founded: 1930
- Founder: Thomas Dachser
- Headquarters: Kempten (Allgäu), Germany
- Key people: Burkhard Eling (CEO)
- Revenue: EUR 7.1 billion (2021)
- Number of employees: 31,756 (2021)
- Website: dachser.com

Dachser Group SE & Co. KG is a German logistic company founded by Thomas Dachser in 1930. Their headquarters are stationed in Kempten in the Allgäu region. In January 2005, Thomas Dachser's grandson, Bernhard Simon, took over as head of the Management Board. DACHSER is involved in the European Logistics, Air & Sea Logistics, and Food Logistics business segments. In contract logistics, the group provides transport, warehousing and value-added services.

== History of the company ==
1930–1938: Conventional transport

DACHSER started in 1930 during the Great Depression, transporting Allgäu cheese to the Rhineland region, and opened the company's first subsidiary in Memmingen in 1934. This was followed four years later by the opening of a branch in Neuss in the Rhineland, at which time DACHSER became the leading transport company in the Allgäu region.

1939–1950: The war and post-war years

In the Second World War, the vehicle fleet was requisitioned and the drivers enlisted by the state. All of the company's sites were destroyed during the war. Shortly after the end of the war, DACHSER started trading again and, in 1949, "Thomas Dachser Spedition" was added to the commercial registry.

1951–1971: Conventional transport company

Growth of the company took off in the 1950s, with a large number of new branches opening in Germany and the addition of international overland, air and sea freight services. DACHSER opened its first air-freight office at Munich Airport in 1951 and, by the end of the decade, employed more than 1,000 people, generating revenue of more than DM 70 million.

In 1969, the company was a founding member of Kombiverkehr KG, the aim of which was to integrate road and rail transport. One of the purposes of the newly established venture was to organize the rail transport of trucks and swap bodies for their partners. This was one of the reasons behind DACHSER opting to change over its entire fleet to swap-body vehicles by 1971. The outside dimensions chosen for the interchangeable carriers were then taken up by other manufacturers and transport companies and became an industry standard.

1972–1989: Logistics as a core function

Following the death of the founder, Thomas Dachser, in 1979, the company was inherited by his daughters, Christa Rohde-Dachser and Annemarie Simon.

In 1982, the company started to offer its customers warehousing and transport of temperature-sensitive food products, which was handled by the newly established Fresh Produce (now Food Logistics) division.

1990–1999: Logistics optimizes process chains

In 1994 the company introduced the SSCC (Serial Shipping Container Code) for the identification of packages. This barcode became well-established in transport logistics as a unique identification code. DACHSER acquired the French logistics provider, Graveleau, in 1999, enabling the company to expand its network in Europe and North Africa.

2000 – present: Global logistics networks

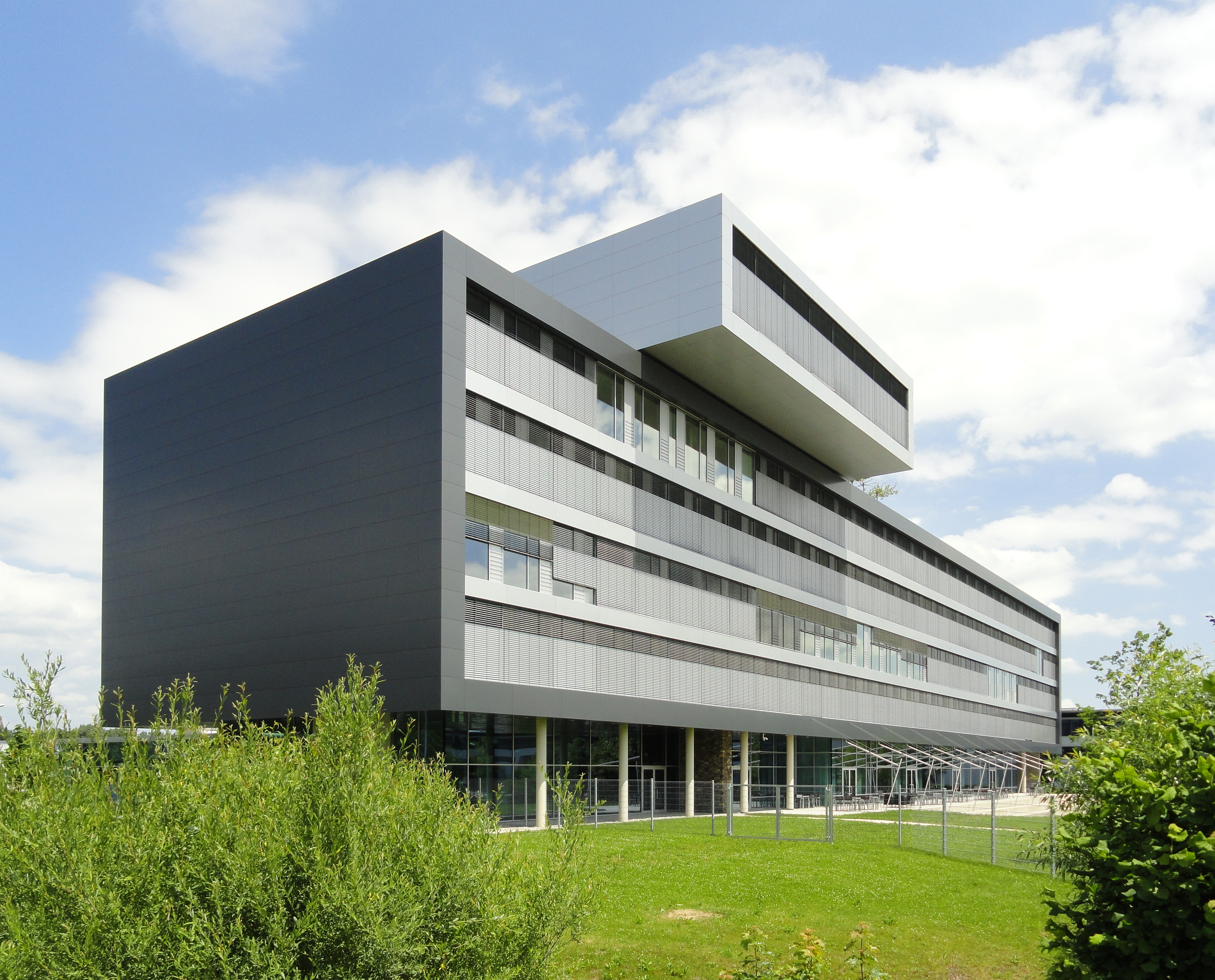
Head Office in Kempten/Allgäu, 2012

With the acquisition of the Haugstedt Group in 2005, DACHSER extended its network in northern Europe. Since then, DACHSER has been expanding in Asia, Europe, Central, and South America, and the United States. Further developments include the establishment of the "Logimasters & DACHSER" joint venture in Brazil and the strengthening of the Group's presence in the Czech Republic through the acquisition of the logistics provider, E.S.T.. In 2010, DACHSER took over J A LEACH Transport Ltd., based in Rochdale, United Kingdom and in early 2013 acquired the Spanish air and sea freight company, Transunion S. A., driving expansion in Spain, Turkey, Argentina, Peru and Mexico.

With the acquisition of Spanish logistics provider Azkar, with headquarters in Coslada near Madrid, on January 15, 2013, DACHSER's presence in Spain and Portugal grew to 91 facilities, employing 3,000 people. On October 14, 2013, the company acquired a majority of the shares of the Finnish air and sea freight company, Oy Waco Logistics Finland. Based in Vantaa in southern Finland, close to the capital, Helsinki, Oy Waco Logistics Finland operates additional offices in the economic hubs of Lahti, Oulu, Tampere and Vaasa. With a workforce of 54, the company generated EUR 24 million in revenue in 2012. It announced a name change to SE & Co. KG, in February 2015, transferring the Road Logistics and Air & Sea Logistics business segments to the wholly owned subsidiary, DACHSER SE.

== Network ==
DACHSER has 437 locations around the world. The European network consists of branches interacting on a daily basis through a mix of direct lines, platforms and hubs.

The logistical hubs in Europe, the Eurohubs, are situated in Überherrn, Bratislava and Clermont-Ferrand. Intercontinental connections take place through DACHSER's Air & Sea Logistics global air and sea freight network with 200 locations and local partners.

== Software ==
DACHSER has developed its own uniform IT to manage its global logistics processes. This is maintained at the company's headquarters in Kempten. DACHSER also uses uniform hardware and software in all its branches. DACHSER's central IT system is ISO 27001 certified.

== Responsibility ==
DACHSER SE is a 100% family owned company, still headed by a member of the family, Bernhard Simon, the grandson of founder Thomas Dachser, as CEO. A shareholder agreement signed in 2007, with a supervisory board including a majority of non-family experts, ensures monitoring and transparency in terms of good corporate governance. For several years, Bernhard Simon has been involved with the children's charity, terre des hommes.

By funding a professorship in Sustainable Logistics & Supply Chain Management at the European Business School DACHSER is investing in sustainability research with a focus on logistics.

== Awards ==
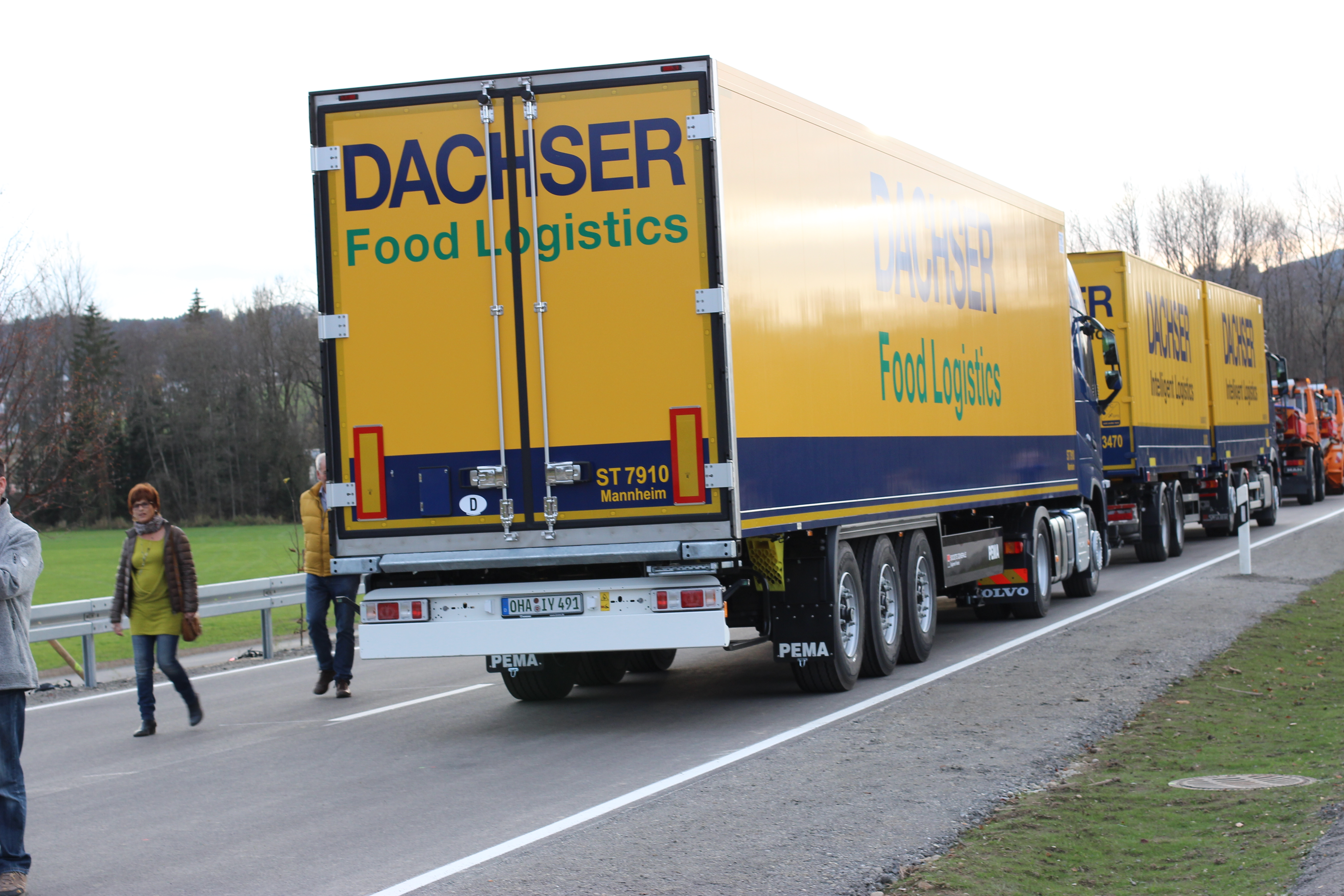
Trucks of Food Logistic Shuttle Transport near Kempten, 2015

In 2008, Bernhard Simon was presented with the LEO (Logistics, Excellence, Optimization) Award in the "Entrepreneur of the Year" category by the Deutsche Verkehrszeitung publication. In the same year, the INTES Academy for Family Companies and Impulse magazine designated Bernhard Simon as the "Family Entrepreneur of the Year".

The "Image ranking transport and logistics services 2014" study, conducted by the Kleffmann market research organization for the Munich-based weekly magazine, Verkehrs Rundschau, ranked DACHSER as the top performer in the "General load and piece-goods transport", "Food and consumer goods logistics" and "Air freight and international sea container transport" categories.

In 2014, the corporate video: "Cut!", produced by logistics service provider DACHSER, won the Intermedia-globe Gold Award at the World Media Festival in Hamburg.

In the 2014 Fox Awards, the DACHSER Magazine won the Gold award in the Customer Magazine category.

== Statistics ==
In 2019, DACHSER employed 30,609 people at 375 locations and generated EUR 5.66 billion revenue. The company handled 83.7 million shipments.

== Literature ==
Erker, Paul. Das Logistikunternehmen Dachser: Die treibende Kraft der Familie als Erfolgsfaktor im globalen Wettbewerb. Frankfurt: Campus, 2008.
