= Wörgl Hauptbahnhof =

Railway station in Tyrol, Austria

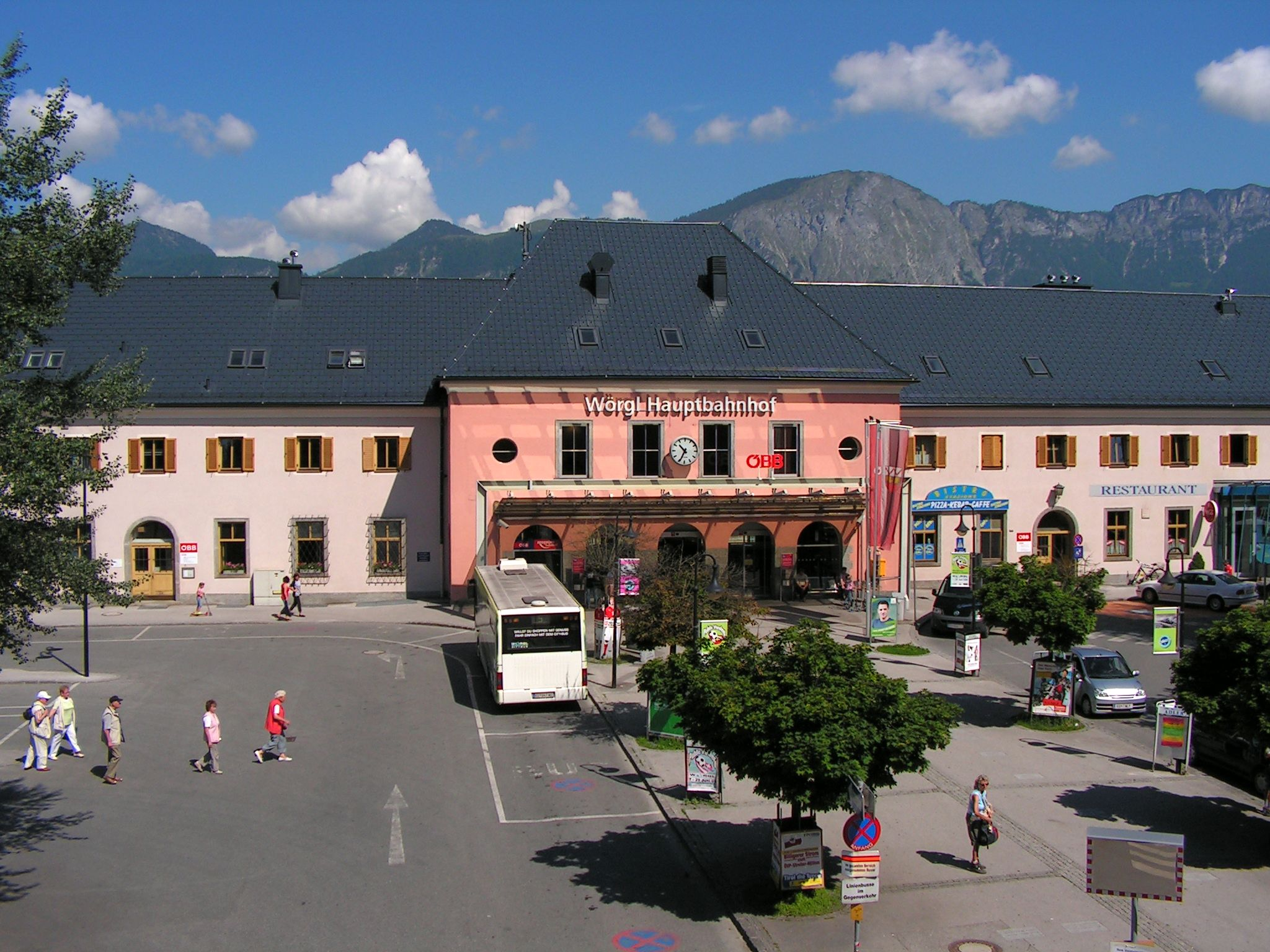
- The Bahnhofstrasse leads away from the station

General information
- Location: Bahnhofplatz; 6300 Wörgl; Austria
- Coordinates: 47°29′30″N 12°03′43″E
- Owner: Austrian Federal Railways (ÖBB)
- Operator: Austrian Federal Railways (ÖBB)
- Lines: Lower Inn Valley railway Salzburg-Tyrol Railway
- Platforms: 10

History
- Opened: 24 November 1858

Services
Preceding station	DB Fernverkehr	Following station
Jenbach towards Innsbruck Hbf	ICE 11	Kufstein towards Berlin Gesundbrunnen
Preceding station	ÖBB	Following station
Jenbach towards Zürich HB	EuroCity (Transalpin)	Kirchberg in Tirol towards Graz Hbf
Jenbach towards Innsbruck Hbf	Nightjet	Kufstein towards Amsterdam Centraal or Hamburg-Altona
Preceding station	Tyrol S-Bahn	Following station
Kundl towards Telfs-Pfaffenhofen	S4	Kirchbichl towards Kufstein
Terminus	S8	Wörgl Süd-Bruckhäusl towards Hochfilzen
Location
- Location within Tyrol, Austria Location within Austria

Wörgl Hauptbahnhof is the main railway station of Wörgl, a city in the Kufstein district of the Austrian federal state of Tyrol, about 20 km from the state border with Bavaria. It is a major hub for regional and international rail travel, both passenger and freight.

== Location ==
Wörgl is located at the junction of two major rail lines.

One is the former Lower Inn Valley Railway, designed by Alois Negrelli, the engineer who designed the Suez Canal, and opened in 1858. The route runs from Munich through Wörgl and Innsbruck to Verona. It was constructed by engineer Carl Ritter von Ghega, who also built the Semmering railway.

The second is the electrified Western Railway, which runs from Vienna through Linz, Salzburg and Wörgl to Buchs, St. Gallen on the Swiss border. Some of its sections were once part of other lines: the Empress Elisabeth Railway from Vienna to Wörgl, the Salzburg-Tyrol Railway from Salzburg to Wörgl, and the Brixental Railway from Zell am See to Wörgl.

== The importance of the station ==
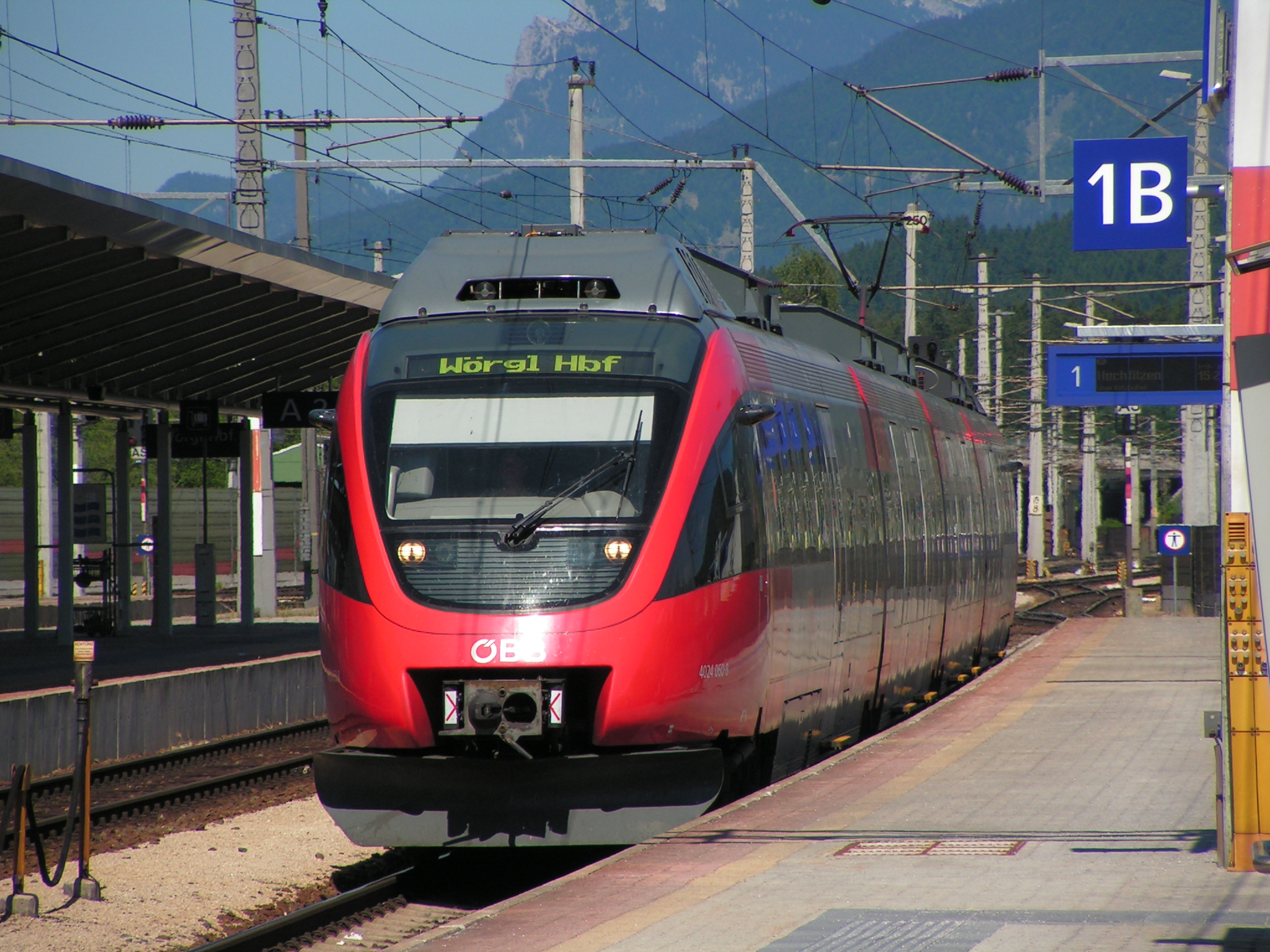
An ET 4024 train at platform 1B, Wörgl Hauptbahnhof

The city of Wörgl, located on the right bank of the river Inn about 60 kilometres east of Innsbruck, Austria, is the second most important stop on the Western Railway, after Innsbruck. In 2013, more than 12,000 travellers passed through the station daily, nearly as many people as live in Wörgl itself. Commuters to Innsbruck's main railway station comprise the second-highest volume of passengers in the state of Tyrol. A comprehensive bus network based on the station makes the city of Wörgl is one of the most transit-connected municipalities in Austria.

As the largest train station in the immediate vicinity of the new line, and the only one with repair facilities for locomotives and rail cars, the Wörgl station played an important role in the construction of the four-track Lower Inn Valley Railway, the first stage of which opened in 2012.

== Station operations and facilities ==
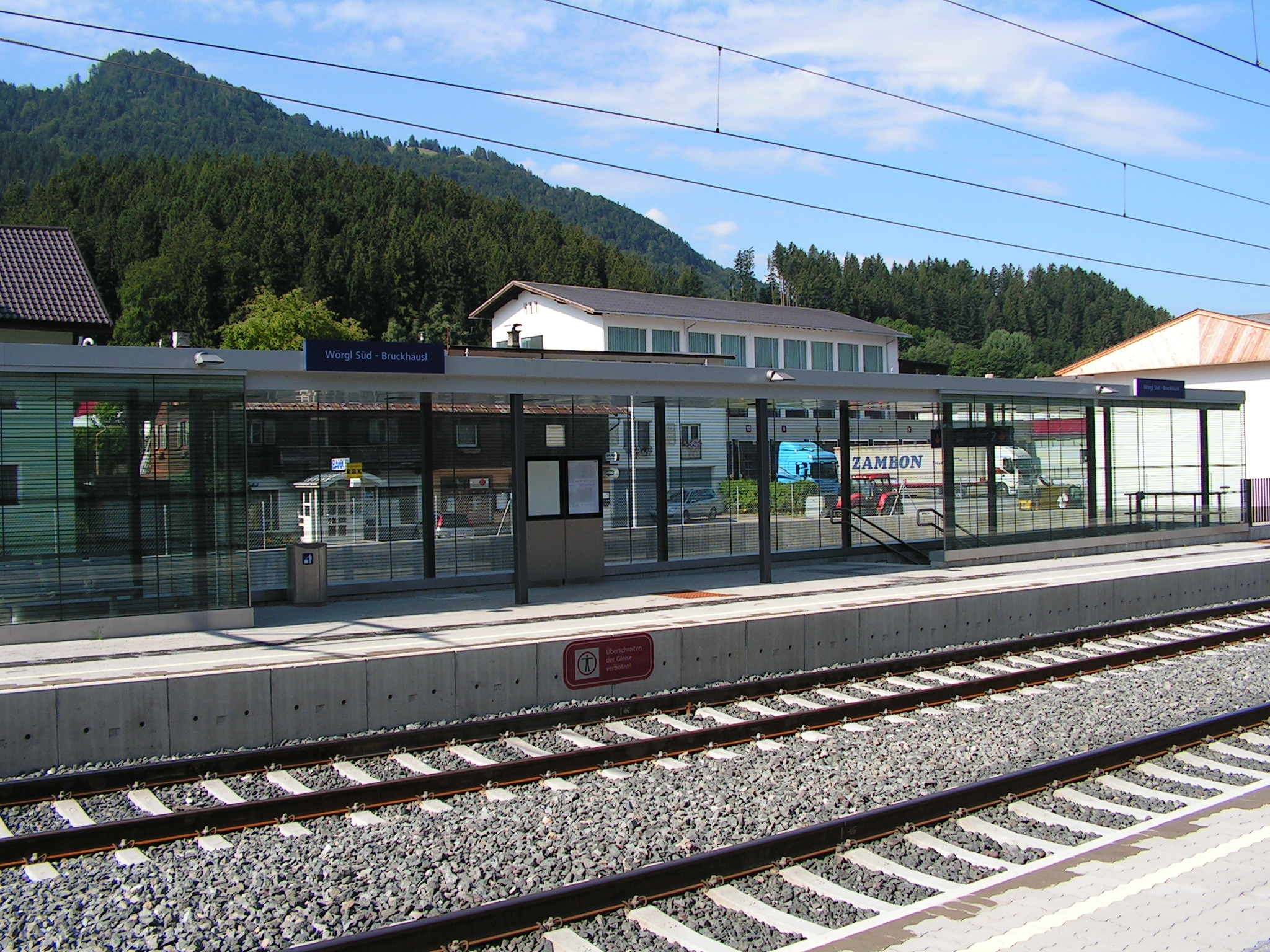
Wörgl South - Bruckhäusl platform

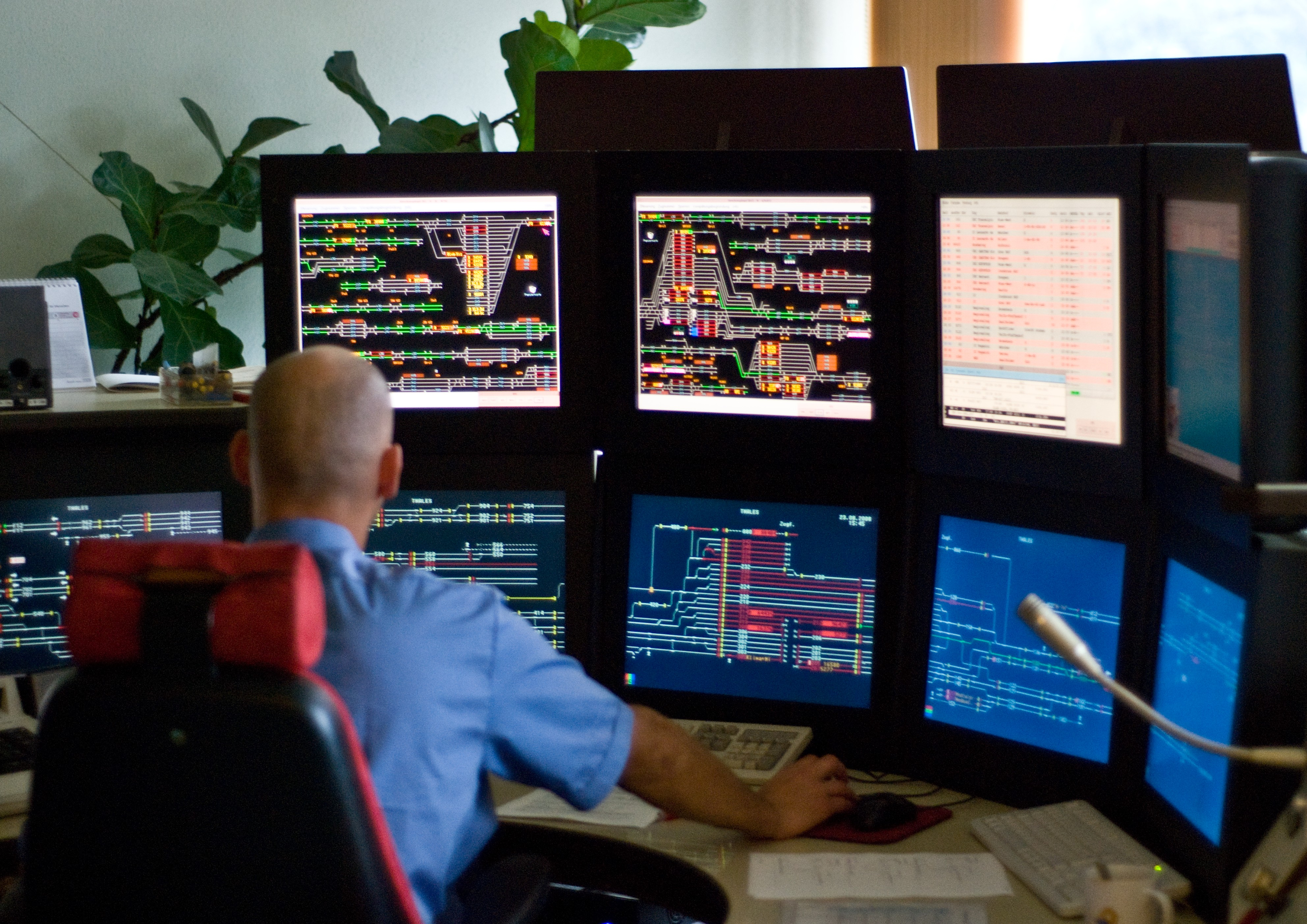
One of the command stations in the Wörgl signalling centre

All trains that pass through Wörgl Hauptbahnhof, including the high-speed trains of the Austrian Federal Railways, are mainly headed to and from Vienna to the east and Zurich or Bregenz to the west. The station has seven continuous platforms, each 400 metres long and divided into five sectors (A to E). Three additional shorter non-continuous platforms (11 to 13) serve regional transport to and from Brixental. The planned eastern section of the Innsbruck bypass will bypass Wörgl Hauptbahnhof and carry mainly freight traffic.

The station's four shunting locomotives assemble the various freight and passenger coaches. These belong to the Austrian Federal Railways classes 1063 and 2070. The stations' shunting locomotives also assemble trains for the Schiebau, Kufstein, Hopfgarten, Westendorf and Kirchberg stations, as well as the freight terminals in Wörgl. There is also a technical services site with class 2067 trains and RoLa low-floor vehicles, and departments to look after construction, security, communications, electronics and other services.

The complex also includes a freight terminal with a logistics centre and a loading station for the Rolling highway, an electrical substation and extensive connecting tracks. An Austrian Federal Railways operations manager, a shunting manager and a station manager are stationed in Wörgl, along with several other supraregional managers.

The Wörgl main station alone (without counting secondary stations and the shunting area) comprises 26 main tracks and several sidings, 167 rail crossings, 388 signals and 14 derailers. Besides the main station, Wörgl Hauptbahnhof itself, the secondary stations are named Wörgl Kundl, Wörgl Terminal West, Wörgl Terminal North, Wörgl Terminal South and Wörgl Süd - Bruckhäusl. The points and signals are operated from the main station.

Wörgl Terminal West is for freight trains only. There are plans to add a west suburban passenger stop with the same name at the northern terminal.

The station also has its own locomotive depot, overseen by a superintendent in Wörgl. There is also a 24-metre turntable.

=== Signal facilities ===
The services between Radfeld and Hopfgarten in Brixental are controlled from the main station. Therefore, traffic controllers of the Wörgl Hauptbahnhof also are responsible for train service in Wörgl, Kundl, Kirchbichl, Kufstein, the three terminals (North, South and West), and the crossings in Wörgl & Süd - Bruckhäusl and Schaftenau. The signalling centre is part of the Austrian Federal Railways western management centre.

== History ==
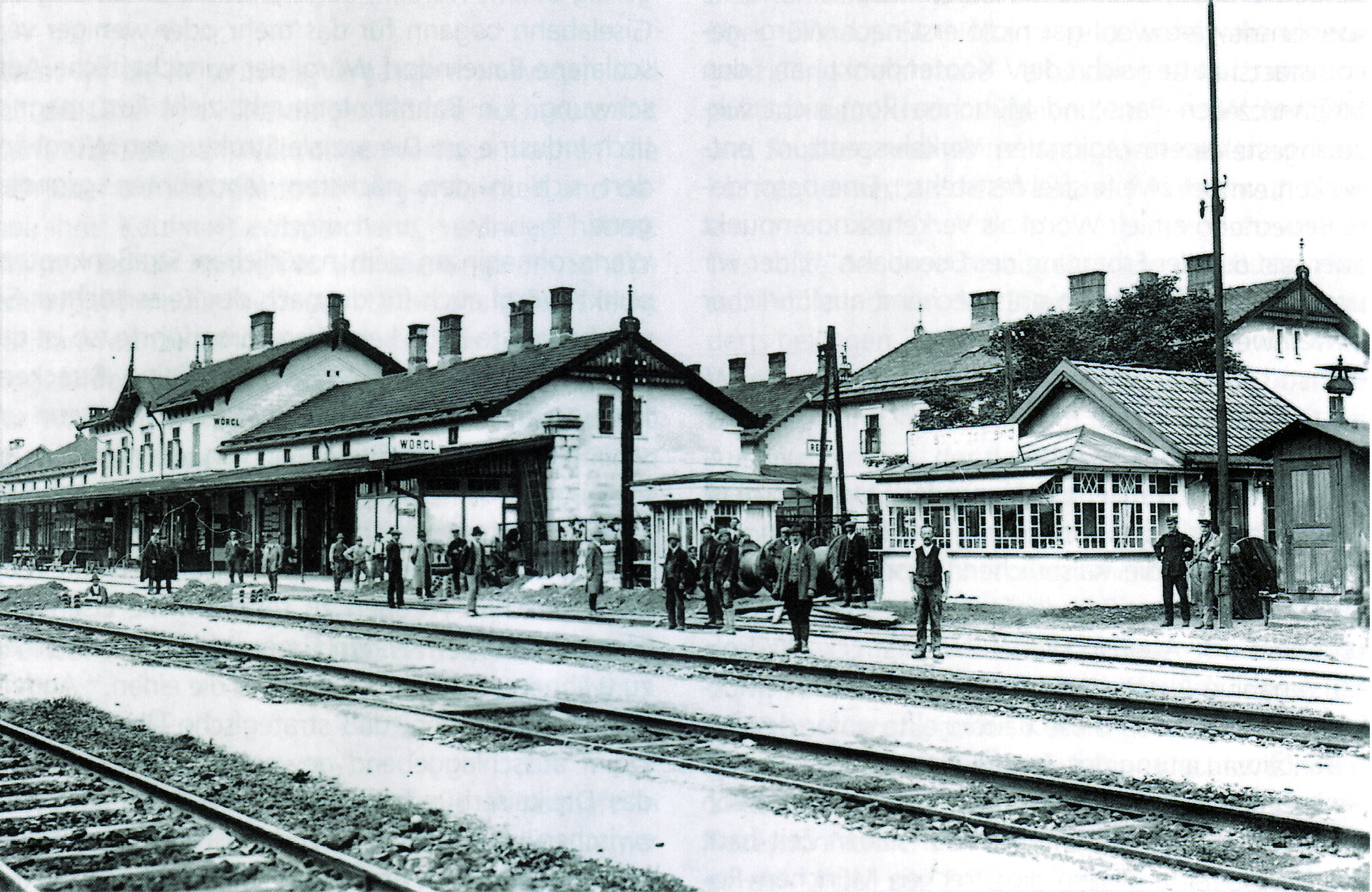
Wörgl Hauptbahnhof in 1900

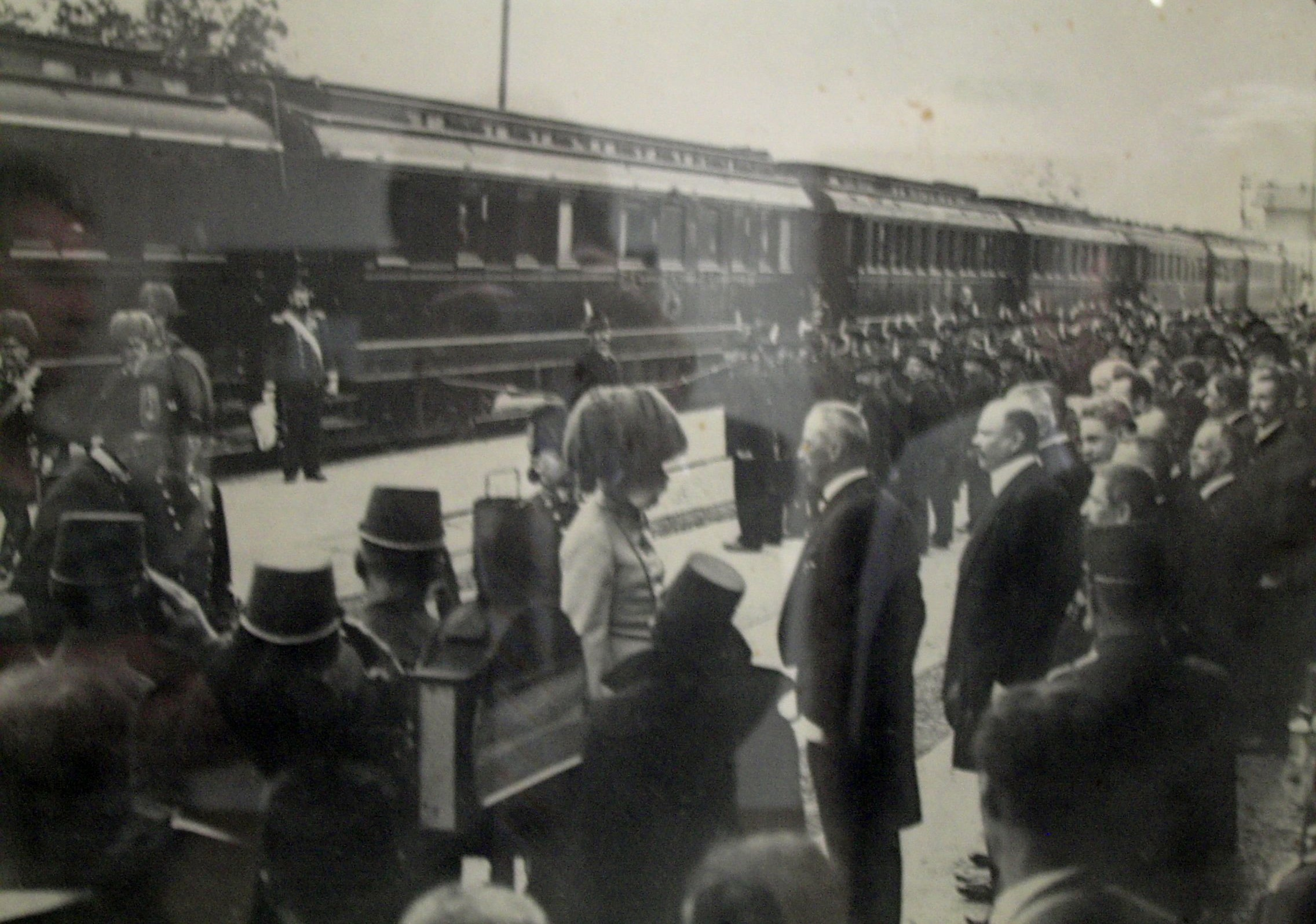
Emperor Franz Joseph I visits Wörgl Hauptbahnhof in 1909

Wörgl Hauptbahnhof was built in 1858 and opened on 24 November 1858 by Austrian Emperor Franz Joseph I. When the Salzburg-Tyrol Railway opened on 6 August 1875, Wörgl became, eight years before Innsbruck, the first railway junction in modern western Austria. A 150-year celebration was held in August 2008.

Until the late 1990s, trains used to switch from right-hand drive to left-hand drive at Wörgl. A flat crossing was built which made it possible to change tracks at 120 km/h. Today, all trains in western Austria run on the right-hand track. Beginning in 1928, all railway routes leading through Wörgl have been electrified with 15 kV, 16.7 Hz alternating current.

The station and its building were almost completely destroyed during the Second World War. After the war, the station building was moved about 500 meters to the west, rebuilt and reopened in 1950.

=== Modern renovations and station renaming ===
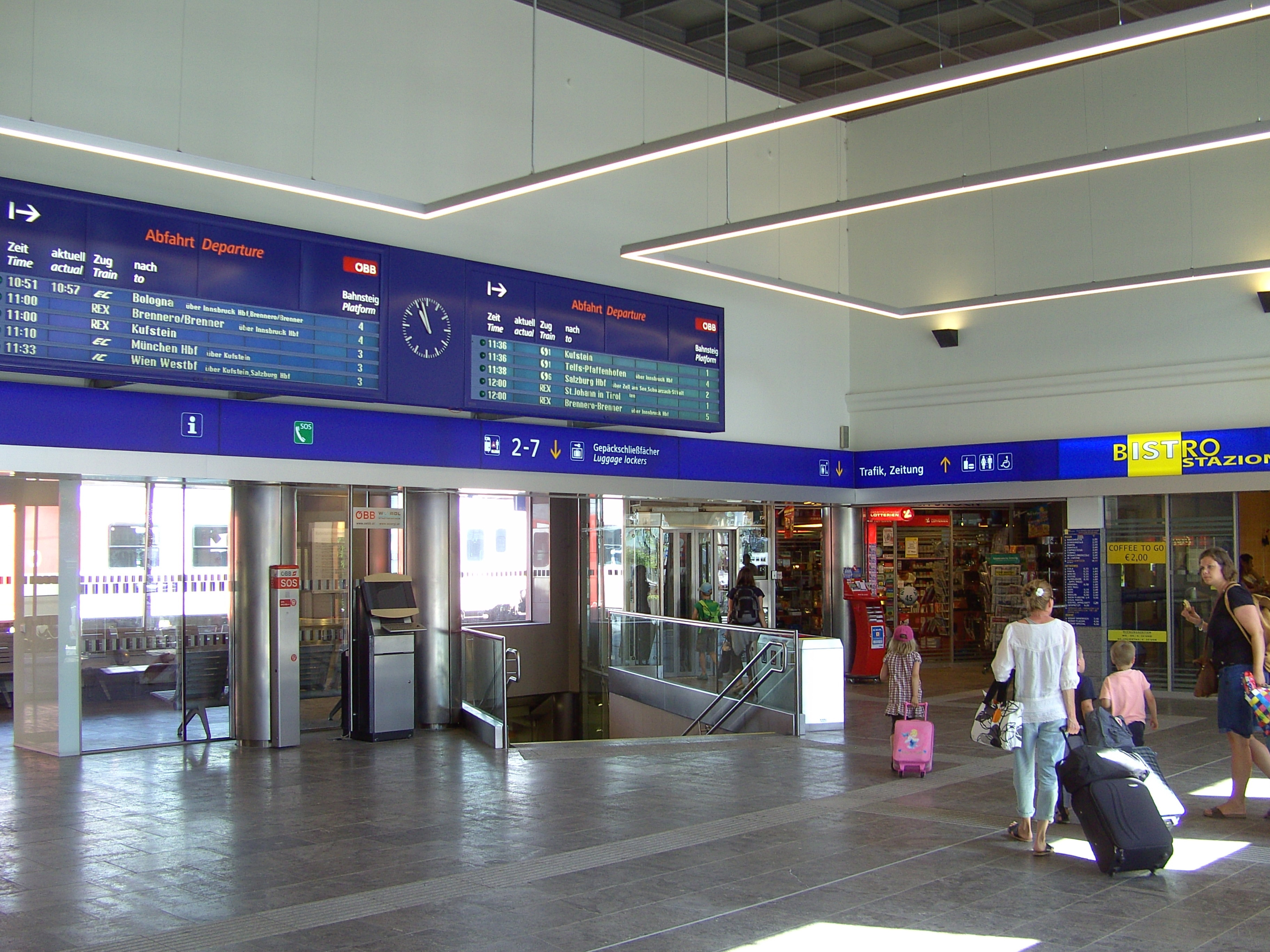
The new departures hall (looking east

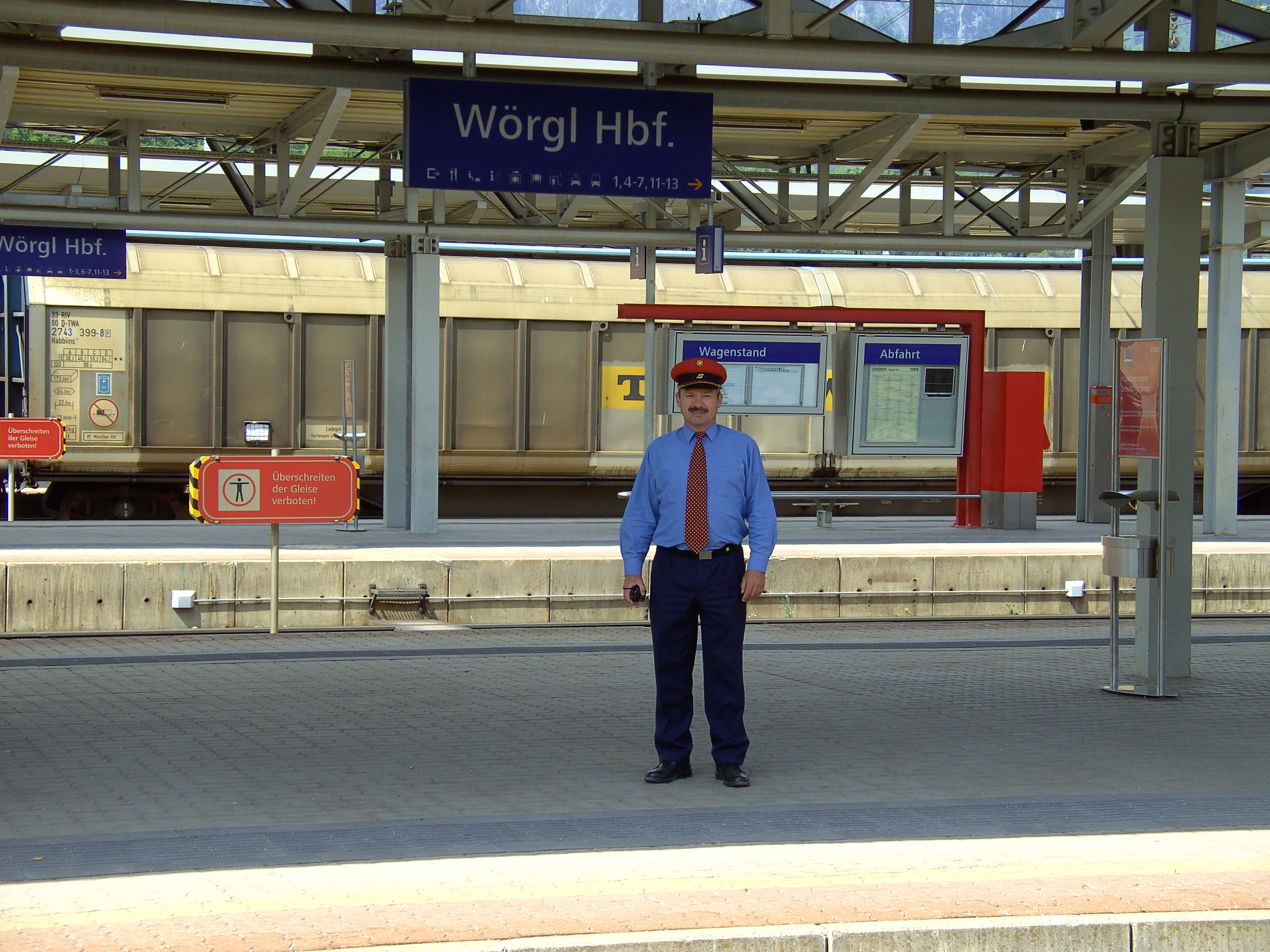
A traffic control supervisor on platform 3, under new signage

In 1993, Austrian Federal Railways spent 100 million Euros on an almost complete renovation of Wörgl Hauptbahnhof. The station was equipped with a new computer interface and an automated system for assigning trains to tracks. A new hall on the upper levels includes a panoramic view of the grounds. One new platform was constructed, as well as freight terminals. A third track was built between the secondary stations Wörgl Kundl and Wörgl Terminal North. Ten platforms were equipped with passenger elevators.

In the spring of 2006, Wörgl railway station was renamed Wörgl Hauptbahnhof ("Wörgl main station"), partly due to its size and importance, and partly to distinguish it from the large number of other railway stations in Wörgl. Later that year, in addition to the name change on timetables, a number of renovations were undertaken, including a partial redesign of the station hall and platform, and the installation of a new video surveillance system. All station signage was replaced and changed to the new corporate colours of the Austrian Federal Railways. International trains also began to be announced in English as well as in German.

The north terminal was expanded considerably in 2012, while in 2014, the departure hall was renovated and the lighting mostly switched to LEDs. A park and ride facility for 290 cars was added. Green space was constructed as part of a renovation of the station forecourt, where the regional, supraregional and city bus lines depart. Freight loading operations were moved to the cargo terminal where an industrial park is springing up.

== See also ==
- Rail transport in Austria
