= Thomas Dachser =

German businessman

Thomas Dachser (13 March 1906, in Haldenwang (near Günzburg) – 11 April 1979, in Munich) was a German businessman. In 1930, he founded the forwarding agency Dachser in Kempten in the Allgäu. Today the business, still owned by the family, is one of the largest logistics service providers in Europe. In 1977, Thomas Dachser was awarded the Bavarian Order of Merit by the then prime minister of Bavaria Alfons Goppel.
