= ERS Railways =

Railway company

ERS Railways B.V
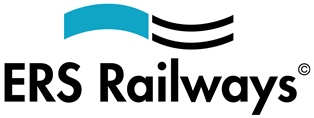
- Company type: BV
- Industry: Railway
- Founded: 1994
- Headquarters: ERS Railways B.V. Albert Plesmanweg 61B; 3088 GB Rotterdam, Netherlands
- Products: Railways and Logistic Provider
- Services: ISO container, tank and trailer transportation
- Number of employees: 100
- Parent: Hupac
- Subsidiaries: ERS Railways
- Website: www.ersrail.com

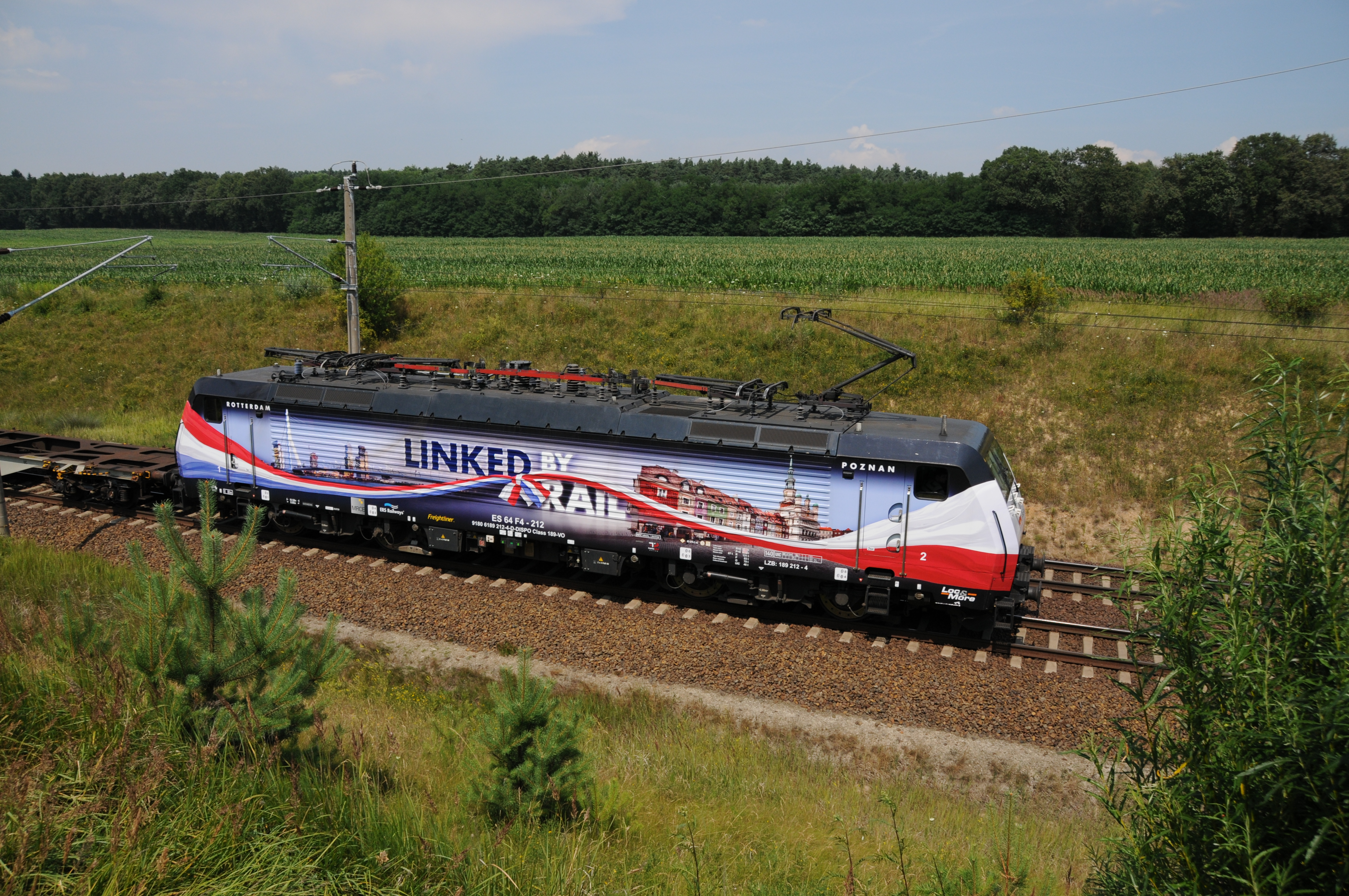
ERS Railways Linked by Rail locomotive

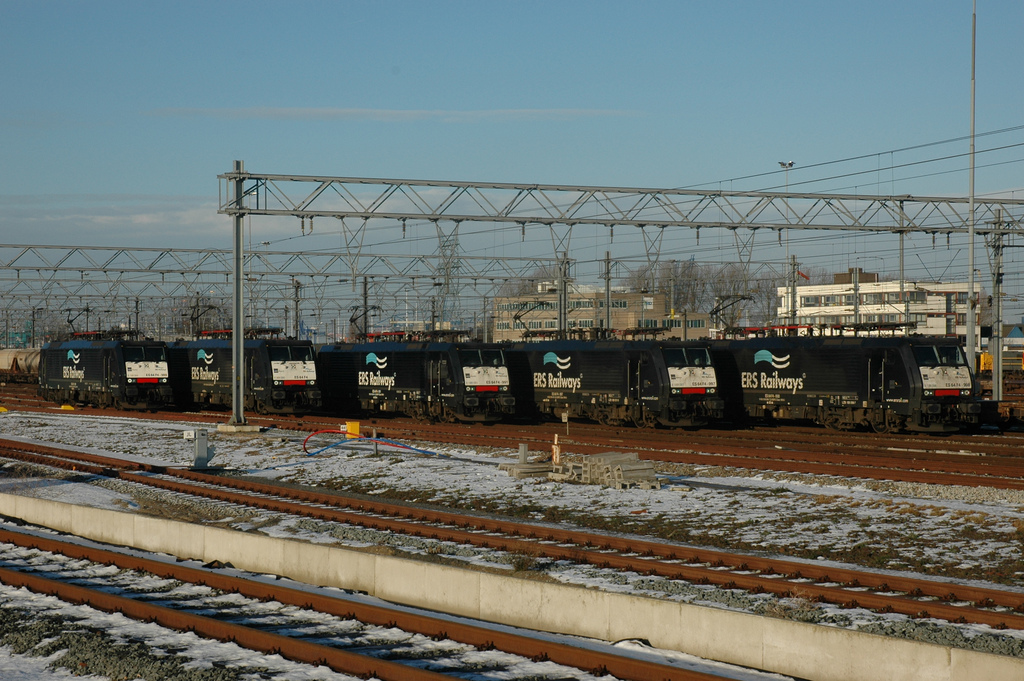
Siemens ES 64 F4 Electric locomotive with the ERS Railways logo at the Waalhaven-Zuid in Rotterdam.

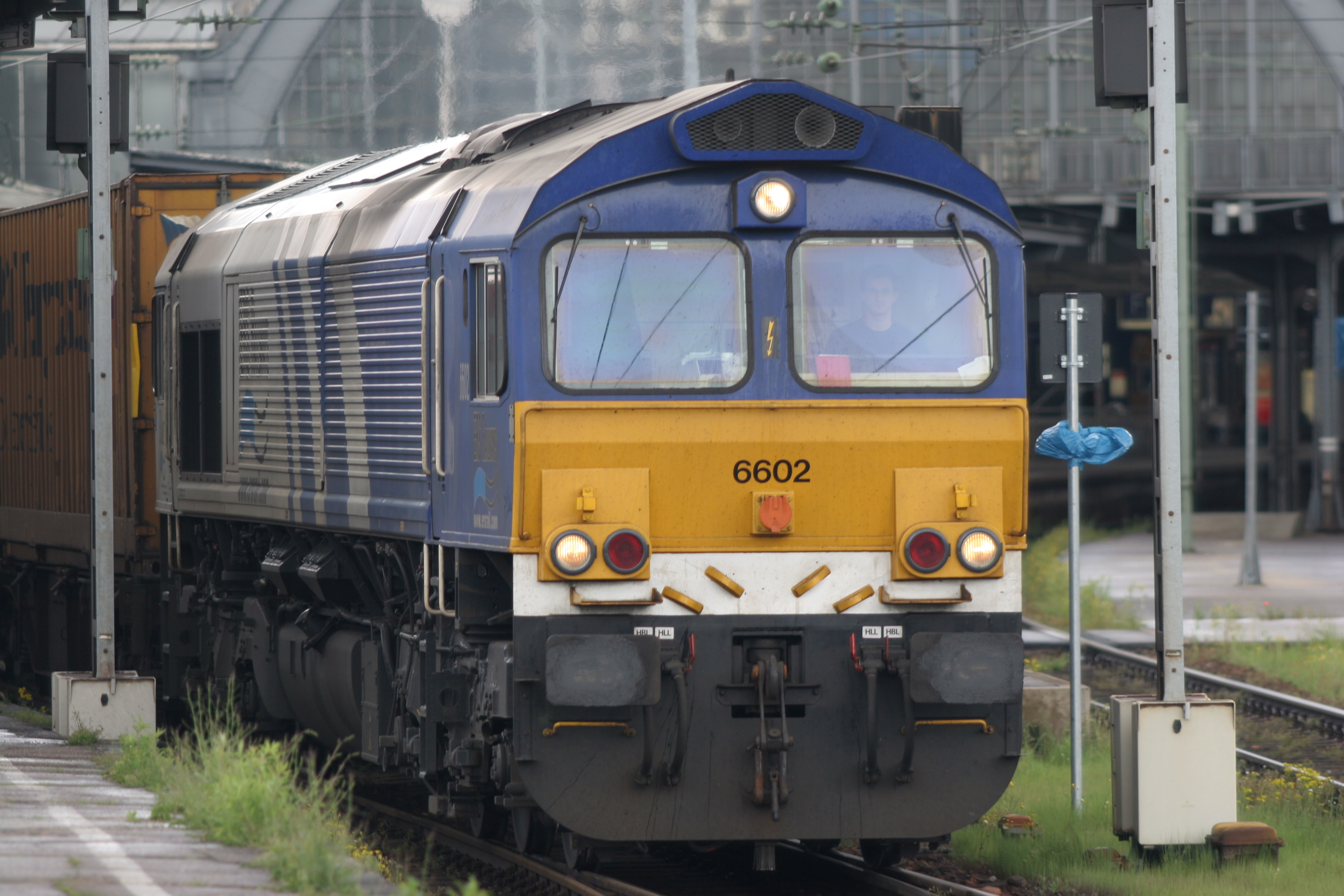
Class 66 locomotive of ERS Railways in Karlsruhe.

ERS Railways (formerly European Rail Shuttle B.V.) is a rail freight company presently owned by the Swiss rail freight company Hupac.

It was established in 1994 as a joint venture of four separate logistics companies: Sealand Service, P&O Containers, Nedlloyd, and NS Cargo. Initial services were hauled using leased rolling stock from other operators; the company has since built up its own inventory, including a fleet of electric locomotives (diesel traction was largely phased out during the 2010s) and over 400 container platforms. By 2014, the company was operating 250 trains per week and had five offices in four European countries. With a modern fleet of locomotives and over 400 container platforms, low-bed as well as double-pocket wagons, they are able to transport container, tank and trailer units. ERS Railways has so far been granted railway licenses in the Netherlands, Belgium, Germany and Austria.

Various changes in ERS Railways' ownership have occurred, the Danish shipping firm Maersk Line obtained total ownership of the company before opting to sell it to the British intermodal railway freight company Freightliner Group in August 2013. During May 2018, the Swiss rail freight company Hupac announced that it would acquire ERS Railway from Freightliner's parent company; it subsequently merged with the company's Duisburg-based subsidiary Hupac Maritime Logistics GmbH and was reorganised as ERS Railways GmbH.

== History ==
European Rail Shuttle B.V. was founded in 1994 as a joint venture between four separate logistics companies: Sealand Service, P&O Containers, Nedlloyd, and NS Cargo. These four companies sought to cooperate in order to take full advantage of the liberalization process that was being enacted across European railways that same year. Shortly following the start of commercial operations, NS Cargo decided to withdraw itself from the joint venture, it was replaced by the Danish shipping firm Maersk Line, which participated alongside the three other founding logistics companies.

From the onset, European Rail Shuttle offered to various customers regular container shuttles that ran between the Dutch port city of Rotterdam and several different destinations along the Rhine river in Germany in addition to Melzo terminal in Italy. During its initial years, the company operated its intermodal services indirectly, opting to buy traction services from various external agencies, largely from state owned railway companies. At the time, the added value offered by the company was based around its organisation of intermodal shuttle solutions, which gathered sufficient volumes from its stakeholders, and tightly monitored and controlled the performance of the traction services that were provided by its external suppliers.

During 2002, European Rail Shuttle opted to change its name to ERS Railways. By this point, its container shuttles were being self-operated using leased locomotives. ERS Railways' strategy was to position itself as a fully independent participant in the sector; to this end, it acquired railway licenses in the Netherlands, Germany and Belgium. Its backers had become keen for the company to pursue expansion within the European railway scene; to this end, ERS Railways became a major shareholder in rival company, boxXpress.de, that same year.

By 2007, ERS Railways BV (at that time fully owned by Maersk Line) had leased 17 Class 66 diesel locomotives that it was using on its long distance corridors. This arrangement changed over the following few years as ERS Railways decided to start reducing its fleet of diesel locomotives as it gradually replaced them with electric locomotives. Since December 2012, ERS Railways has not used diesel locomotives on any of its long-distance transport routes, having opted to solely use electric locomotives for its long-distance routes. Furthermore, ERS Railways is one of the first railway companies who have joined the Dutch-based VIVENS electricity consortium which will supply 100% CO_{2}-free electric energy by 2018.

In August 2013, the British intermodal railway freight company Freightliner Group announced that it was in the process of acquiring ERS Railways B.V. from Maersk Line. In February 2015, the company was included in the acquisition of Freightliner by the American railway company Genesee & Wyoming, placing ERS Railways under American ownership.

By April 2014, ERS Railways was operating 250 trains per week, which carried a various of maritime and tank containers alongside standard and outsize trailer units. It had established branch offices in the cities of Hamburg, Frankfurt, Warsaw, and Prague, and had recorded a turnover of €115 million for the previous year. By this point, ERS Railways' primary competition was not other rail operators but road haulage companies; it was pursuing multiple angles to increase operational efficiencies, such as increased train lengths.

In 2017, ERS Railways opted to discontinue its regular services to both Italy and Poland. During May 2018, the Swiss-based rail freight company Hupac announced its intention to acquire ERS Railways; at the time, it was stated that the company would continue to be operated as an independent entity following the purchase and continue to cooperate with Freighliner. However, it was promptly merged with the company's Duisburg-based subsidiary Hupac Maritime Logistics GmbH and reorganised as ERS Railways GmbH. Into the 2020s, the company has continued to primarily focus on the movement of intermodal traffic between various seaports in both Germany and the Netherlands into major economic hubs across the German hinterland, offering both terminal-to-terminal and terminal-to-door solutions to customers. Some activities have remained aligned with Freightliner.

== Routes ==
ERS Railways is offering the following routes at the moment:

- Lübeck - Ludwigshafen v.v. (6x per week)
- Bremerhaven - Augsburg v.v. (5x per week)
- Bremerhaven - Kornwestheim v.v. (5x per week)
- Bremerhaven - Mannheim v.v. (3x per week)
- Bremerhaven - Munich v.v. (5x per week)
- Bremerhaven - Nürnberg v.v. (5x per week)
- Bremerhaven - Ulm v.v (4x per week)
- Hamburg - Kornwestheim v.v. (5x per week)
- Hamburg - Munich v.v. (5x per week)
- Hamburg - Nürnberg v.v. (5x per week)
- Hamburg - Ulm v.v. (8x per week)

== Terminals ==
- In Rotterdam the containers are loaded at the Rail Service Center Rotterdam Waalhaven and P&O Ferries Europoort.
- In Italy the containers are loaded at the Sogemar Terminal.
- In Poland the containers and the trailers are loaded at the CLIP Terminal.
