= Hupac =

Swiss railway company

- Industry: Railways
- Founded: 1 March 1967
- Headquarters: Chiasso (Ticino), Switzerland
- Revenue: CHF 648,100,000 (2024)
- Net income: CHF −6,200,000
- Number of employees: 700 (2023)

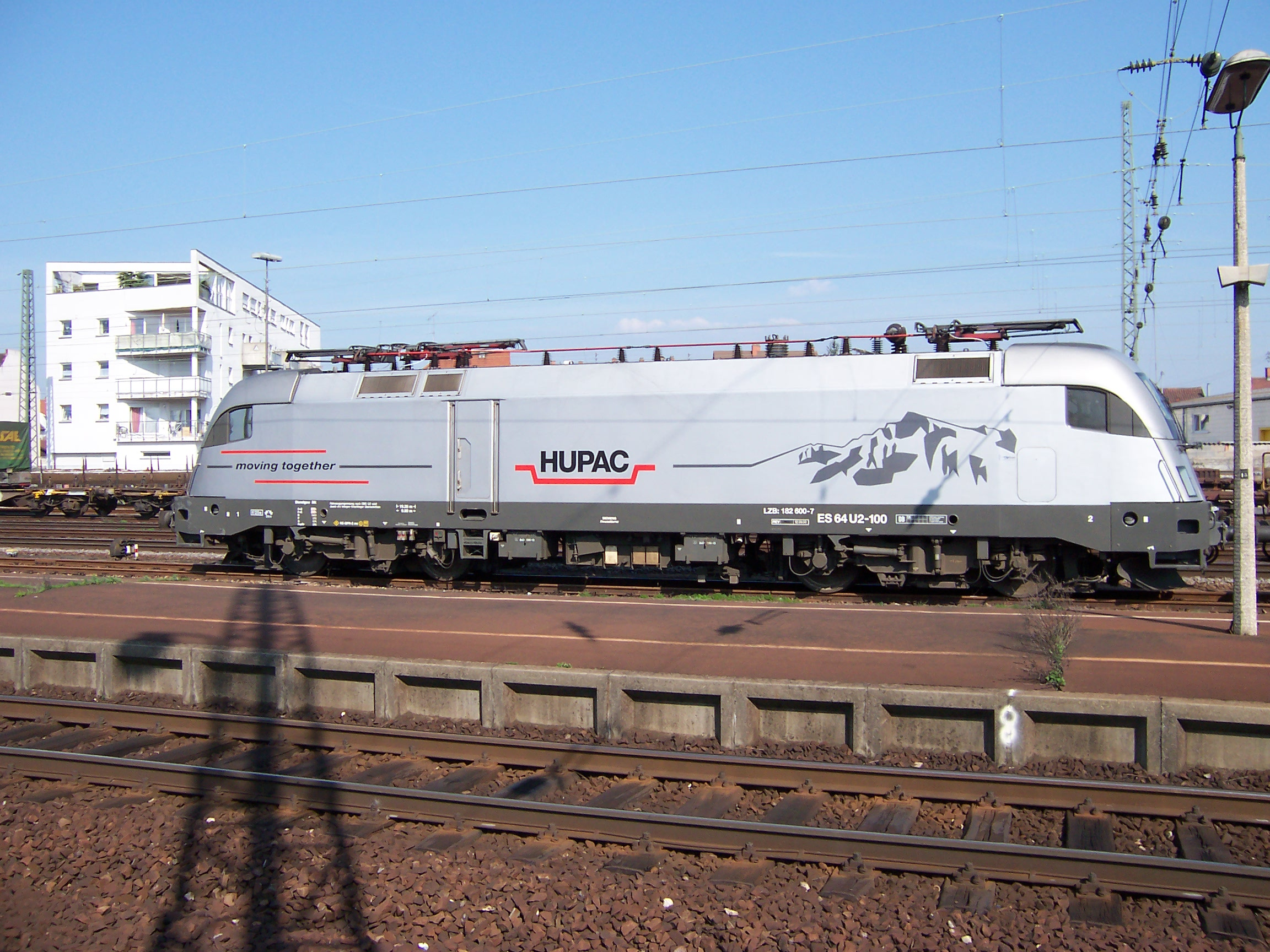
A HUPAC locomotive in Schwetzingen

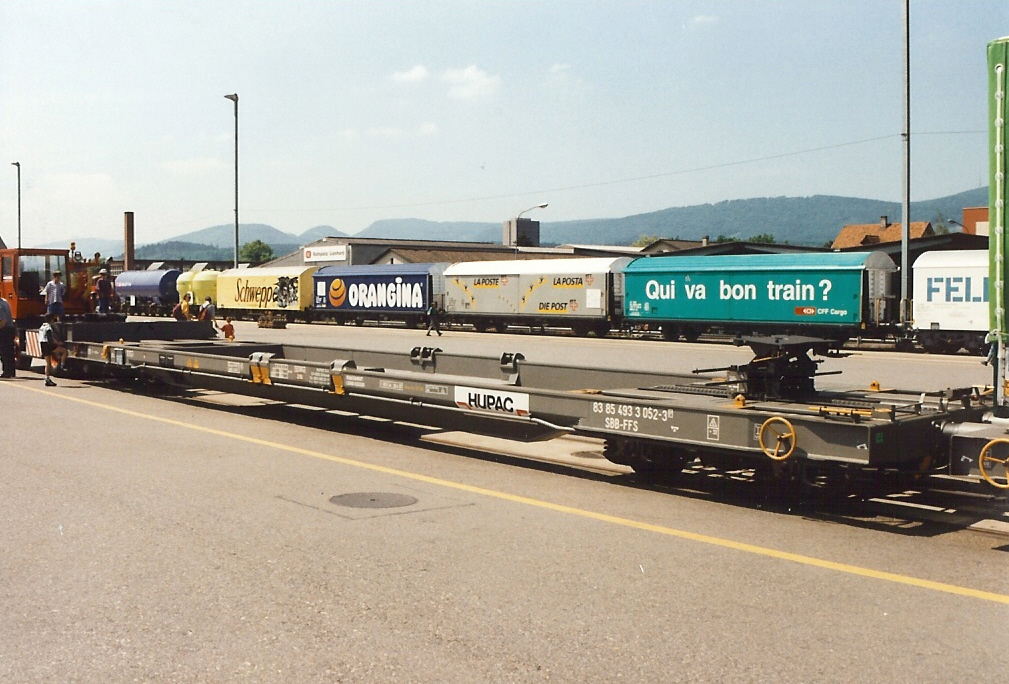
A Hupac well wagon suitable for carrying semi-trailers

Hupac is a railway company in Switzerland. It primarily provides international intermodal freight shipment, but has also engaged in rolling stock procurement and leasing activities.

Founded in 1967 to challenge traditional road haulage, Hupac has progressively expanded its services. During 1976, the firm decided to start offering a rolling highway service which was later expanded internationally. During 1990, the company started organising shuttle trains, by 2011, its Shuttle Net service was operating 130 intermodal trains per day. Various long-distance freight routes have been operated, such as between Scandinavia and Italy, Spain and Russia, and the Netherlands and Romania. Hupac is a member of the UIRR.

== History ==
Hupac was founded in March 1967 by a group of hauliers together with the Swiss Federal Railways with the goal of improving international logistics via rail. It was recognised that the passage of road vehicles often became difficult, or even impossible, during winter via certain key Swiss passes; roads were more likely to suffer closures than counterpart routes on the railways, thus an intermodal rail freight service could capitalise upon its competition being unable to effectively operate. Theo Allemann, an early director of Hupac, observed that intermodal transalpine traffic through Switzerland had seemed futuristic as the time of the company's establishment.

During 1968, the first company's first train ran between Basel and Melide; this was operated using Hupac's own initial fleet of ten wagons. In the following year, Hupac extended its services through to Cologne and Milan while connections to further destinations, including Rotterdam, Hamburg, and Singen, soon followed. During 1976, the firm decided to start offering a rolling highway service along the Altdorf-Cadenazzo route, transporting motor vehicles with drivers from one side of the Alps to the other; this service would be expanded internationally four years later. The company would offer rolling highway services between various Swiss cities, including Basel and Lugano.

In 1978, Hupac begun to centre its Italian freight transfer operations at its terminal in Busto Arsizio, north-west of Milan. During 1990, the company started organising shuttle trains, which comprised wagons that did not change or swap out, between Cologne and the Busto Arsizio terminal. In 1992, a second terminal at Busto Arsizio was opened by Hupac to accommodate the growth in traffic. During 1998, Hupac acquired the Dutch company Trailstar (which was subsequently reorganised as Hupac Intermodal NV) and expanded its connections on the Holland-Italy axis. In the following year, it secured a railway operator's licence in Germany; two years later similar licensing was obtained in Italy.

In 2001, Hupac, together with SBB, BLS, and Trenitalia, jointly established the RAlpin company to manage the rolling highway service between Freiburg and Novara via Lötschberg/Simplon. During 2005, another new terminal at Busto Arsizio-Gallarate was opened. Two years later, Hupac placed sizable orders for 350 flat wagons and 50 pocket wagons; services to France also commenced. During 2009, amid the Great Recession, freight volumes carried by the company reportedly fell by 13.5%, to 607,284 road shipments, yet profit increased. In 2010, traffic volumes increased by 13.7%. In that same year, Hupac acquired a 25% stake in Crossrail, and partnered with the state-owned freight operator SBB Cargo to form a joint venture, SBB Cargo International.

In 2011, Hupac launched its Russian subsidiary Intermodal Express; three years later, Hupac LLC begun operations in the Russian market, specialising in the procurement and leasing of rolling stock. Freight volumes continued to grow throughout the 2010s; Hupac carried 763,101 road consignments by rail in 2017, 3.5 percent more than the previous year, in spite of a seven-week blockade on the Rhine Valley route near Rastatt that prevented the movement of 30,000 consignments. The increase in traffic volume can be partly attributed to the launch of new routes; on 26 May 2017, the first of Hupac's intermodal trains loaded with 82 ISO tank containers departed Korla in northwest China for Europe. Additional long-distance services from the Chinese market have been launched in the following years. Furthermore, multiple new routes to Italy have been enacted, such as to China, Poland, and the Netherlands. Hupac has also advocated for rail infrastructure companies to provide more capacity at congested sections, such as the north–south lines traversing the Rhine Valley.

In June 2017, it was announced that the company had ordered eight new-build Siemens Vectron electric locomotives; they are to be equipped with various national train control systems in addition to the European Train Control System (ETCS). Additional traction permitted the expansion of Hupac's rail transport service from various central European hubs, such as the port of Rotterdam, via the main rail corridors between the Netherlands, Germany, Austria and Switzerland and into the Mediterranean region, including the new Gotthard Base Tunnel. In the late 2010s, Hupac invested in the intelligent digital management of its routes and resources; 1,000 intermodal wagons were equipped with smart sensors that produce real-time information, such as location, impact events, border crossings and mileage at five minute intervals. Route planning and traffic management has been fully automated using software supplied by Nexiot alongside its in-house cargo management systems to predict delays, efficiently route its services. During May 2018, Hupac announced its intention to acquire the Netherlands-based intermodal freight company ERS Railways; at the time, it was stated that the company would continue to be operated as an independent entity following the purchase and continue to cooperate with former Freightliner Group. However, it was promptly merged with the company's Duisburg-based subsidiary Hupac Maritime Logistics GmbH and reorganised as ERS Railways GmbH.

By 2022, Hupac's Shuttle Net service was reportedly operating one hundred trains per day between various destinations across the continent, including Scandinavia-Italy, Spain-Russia, and the Netherlands-Romania.

== See also ==
- ERS Railways
- SBB Cargo International
