= MaK G 1202 BB =

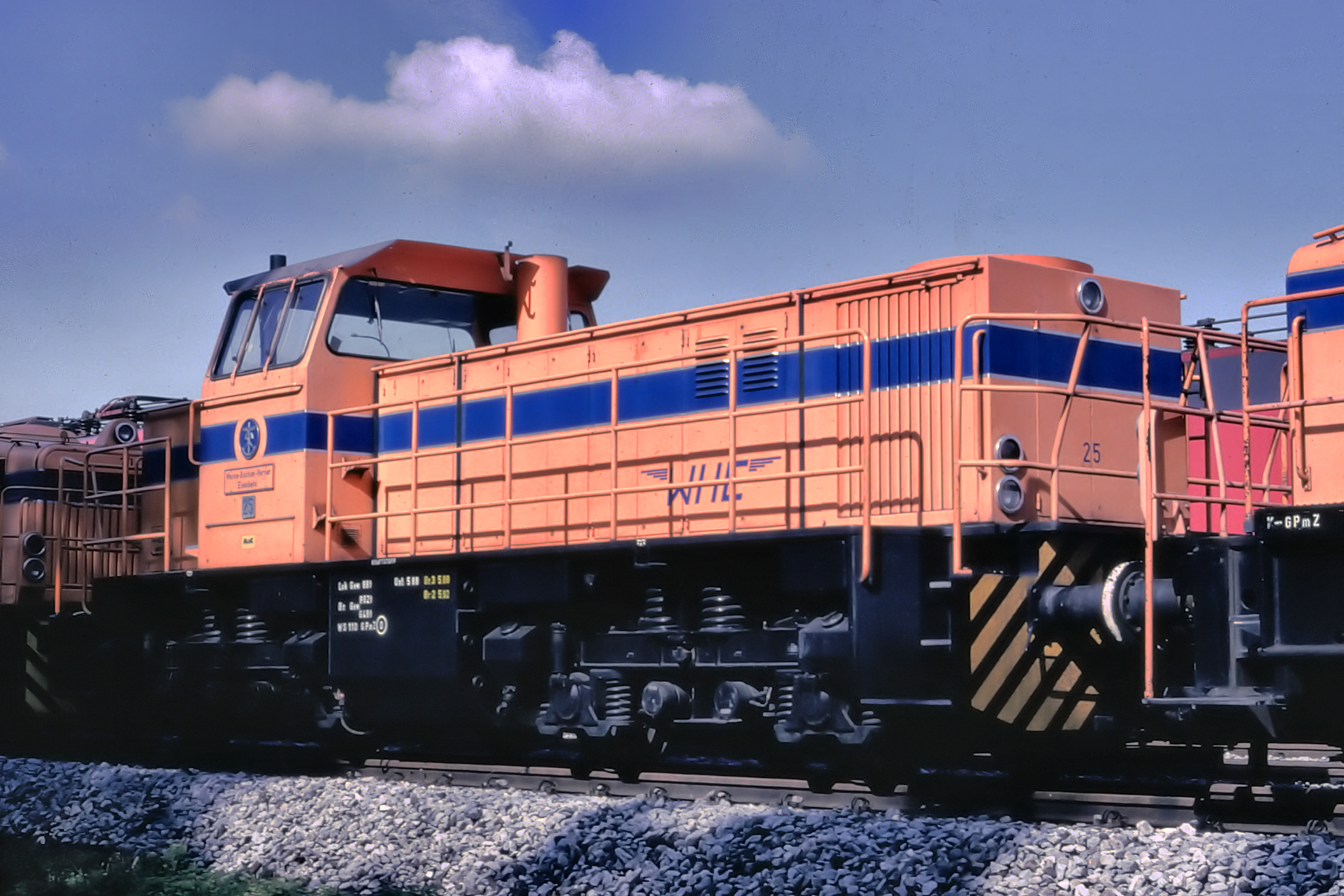
- Wanne-Herner Eisenbahn und Hafen MaK G 1202 BB
Type and origin
- Power type: Diesel
- Builder: MaK
- Build date: 1978–1980
- Total produced: 12
Specifications
- Configuration
  - UIC: B'B'
- Gauge: 1,435 mm (4 ft 8 1/2 in)
- Wheel diameter: 1,000 mm (39.37 in) (new)
- Minimum curve: 60 m (197 ft)
- Wheelbase: bogie centre distance 5.800 m (19 ft 0.3 in) axle distance 2.400 m (7 ft 10.49 in)
- Length: 12.500 m (41 ft 0.1 in)
- Width: 3.100 m (10 ft 2.05 in)
- Height: 4.220 m (13 ft 10.14 in)
- Fuel capacity: 2,500 L (550 imp gal; 660 US gal)
- Prime mover: MTU 12V 331 TC11 : 945 kW (1,267 hp); MTU 12V 331 TC 12 : 1,000 kW (1,300 hp)
- Transmission: Voith L5r4U2
Performance figures
- Maximum speed: 40–75 km/h (25–47 mph)

The MaK G 1202 BB is a four axle B'B' off-centre cab diesel-hydraulic locomotive built by Maschinenbau Kiel in Germany.

== Design and operators ==
The locomotive is a light freight and shunting locomotive; twelve units were built for private railway operators in Germany including 3 for Rheinkalk GmbH (chalk and dolomite mineral company), 2 for Osthannoversche Eisenbahnen, 2 for RAG, and the remainder on various short and medium term leases.

== See also ==
- MaK G 1204 BB, similar design with MTU 396 engine replacing the MTU 331 engine
