= SBB Cargo International =

- Industry: Rail freight
- Headquarters: Olten, Switzerland
- Website: www.sbbcargo-international.com

SBB Cargo International is a rail transport business founded in 2010 as a joint venture between SBB Cargo and Hupac. It was created to engage in the carriage of international rail freight across the European market.

Within six years of commencing operations, SBB Cargo International had demonstrated superior growth on its cross-border services in comparison to traditional domestic routes. The opening of the Gotthard Base Tunnel and Ceneri Base Tunnel, along with leasing of additional electric locomotives, has facilitated an expansion of the company's services. Dedicated subsidiaries, such as SBB Cargo Nederland, have been setup in to reduce reliance on third parties and to allow SBB Cargo International to handle a greater percentage of the work. The company has advocated for infrastructure owners to make numerous changes, such as to provide more frequent diversionary routes and to permit the running of longer trains, with the goal of improving efficiency.

== History ==
Following the failure of SBB's plans to strengthen the profitability and financial independence of its Cargo division via the sale of stakes to other international railway operators, an alternative strategy was adopted by SBB Cargo in 2010. That year, a new railway undertaking called SBB Cargo International was founded in partnership with the privately owned intermodal transport operator Hupac. The new company focuses on block and intermodal trains on the European North-South corridor between Germany and Italy. The shareholders in the new company are SBB Cargo (75%) and Hupac (25%), with further partners possible in the future. The aim is to achieve cost leadership in the intermodal segment by optimising resources on selected routes and halving structural costs. The new company’s customers will primarily comprise intermodal operators, who will account for about 80% of the forecast total sales of CHF 300 million. The new company's headquarters were established at Olten.

In March 2017, it was reported that a record amount of freight traffic carried across the Swiss Federal Railways during the previous year 2016, and that much of the freight success has been down to international movements as opposed to the domestic sector. The boost is partially attributable to the opening of the Gotthard Base Tunnel in 2016, for which SBB Cargo International had made extensive preparations for the operation of new rail freight routes via the tunnel.

During 2017, SBB Cargo International was one of several operators to be heavily impacted by the weeks-long unplanned closure of the Rhine Valley line following a landslide at Rastatt; the firm responded with several measures to provide increased capacity, adjust timetabling, and to coordinate with construction, operations, and crisis management teams. Two years later, the company's freight services in and through the Rhine region were again heavily disrupted for over a month following another landslide that temporarily closed the Middle Rhine Valley line. In early 2023, SBB Cargo International joined with several other railway logistics companies to publicly advocated for infrastructure owners to facilitate alternative rail freight routes along the left bank of the Rhine river in response to a lack of free capacity along the main line. Other measures recommended included repealing the ban on night rail traffic, a greater use of bilingual staff, and the better provision of diversion routes into France.

In December 2019, it was announced that SBB Cargo International had incorporated SBB Cargo Nederland, based in the port city of Rotterdam, to operate in the Dutch rail freight market. Its creation reduced the company's dependence on third parties for the cross-border implementation and planning of trains along the Netherlands-Italy corridor that it operated. Drivers were initially provisioned by sister company SBB Cargo Germany.

Shortly following the Russian invasion of Ukraine in February 2022, SBB Cargo International was one of several logistics operators to quickly arrange trains to deliver relief supplies and aid to Ukraine.

== Fleet ==
At the onset of operations, SBB Cargo International leased a total of 109 locomotives from SBB Cargo; 59 of these were multi-system locomotives outfitted for cross-border operations. The company has pursued various rolling stock changes, including the introduction of longer 740-metre trains and lobbying for infrastructure owners to upgrade their networks to facilitate the expansion of 740-metre compatibility in order to expand freight capacity and bolster operational efficiency.

In July 2019, SBB Cargo international announced that it had ordered 20 Vectron multisystem locomotives from Siemens Mobility along with an option for 20 more locomotives; these were primarily intended for use on the busy Rhine-Alpine Corridor and would be delivered prior to the opening of the Ceneri Base Tunnel. In mid-2022, the firm stated that it had ordered additional 20 Vectrons from Siemens to support its expansion plans.
