= Kombiverkehr =

Kombiverkehr deutsche Gesellschaft für kombinierten Güterverkehr mbH & Co KG
- Type: Limited liability company (Gesellschaft mit beschränkter Haftung)
- Industry: Transport
- Founded: 11 February 1969
- Headquarters: Frankfurt am Main
- Key people: Armin Riedl, Alexander Ochs
- Revenue: 347 million Euro (2009)
- Number of employees: 156 (2009)
- Website: www.kombiverkehr.de

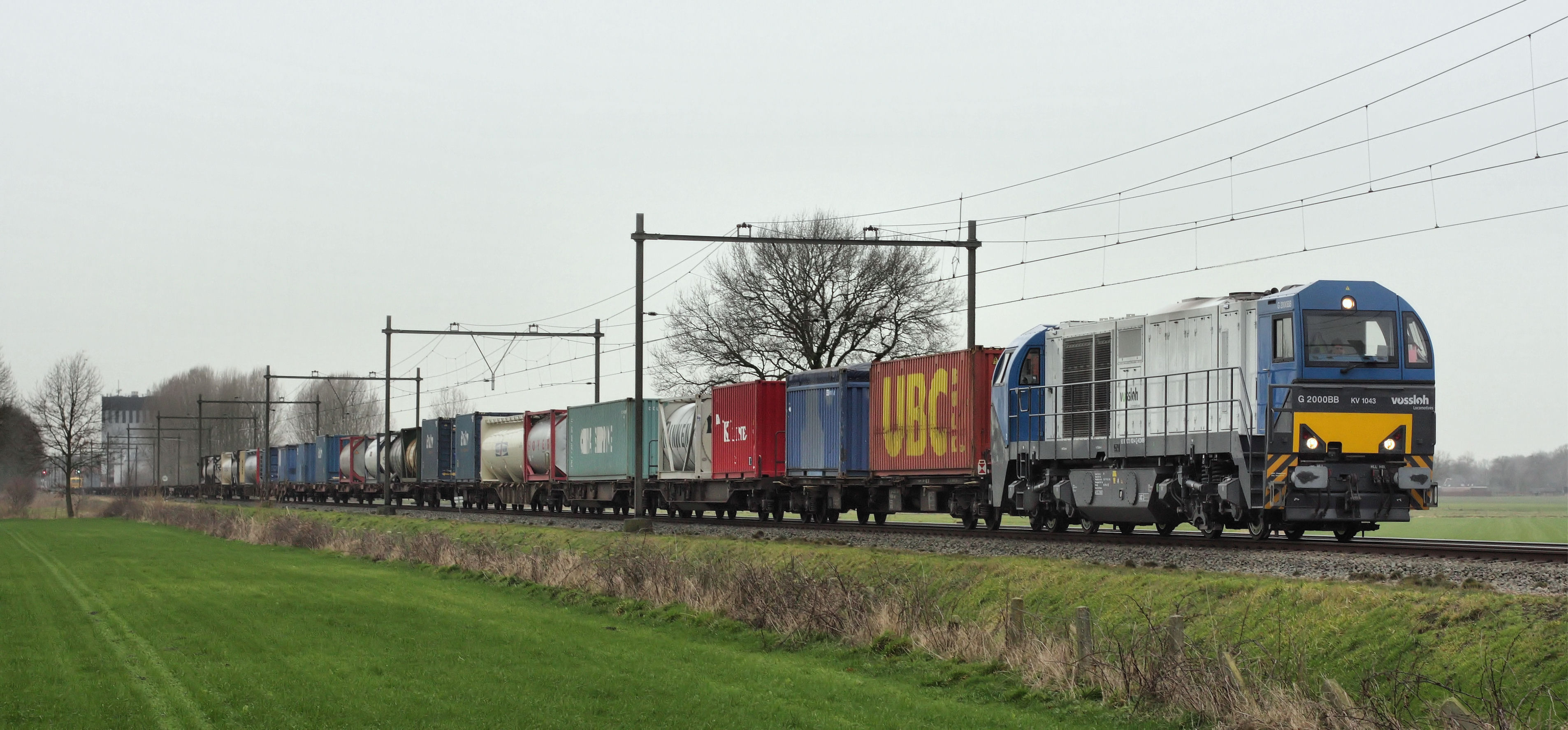
A Kombiverkehr train

Kombiverkehr is an intermodal transport business based in Frankfurt, Germany. It is an intermodal operator in Europe, operating a fleet of block trains linking 30 countries. In May 2010, Kombiverkehr launched a service between Antwerp and Duisburg; services to Turkey have also been launched.

Kombiverkehr is a member of the UIRR.
