= Wanne-Herner Eisenbahn und Hafen =

German railway and canal port operating company

Wanne-Herner Eisenbahn und Hafen GmbH
- Company type: Port and railway operator
- Industry: Logistics (container and bulk products), railways
- Founded: 1913
- Headquarters: Herne, Germany
- Key people: Managing director:Dipl.–Volkswirt Karl–Heinz Adams; Chairman of the supervisory board: Oberbürgermeister Horst Schiereck
- Products: Transportation, coal handling, storage
- Number of employees: 187 (~2004)
- Subsidiaries: BAV Aufbereitung Herne GmbH; CTH Container Terminal Herne GmbH
- Website: http://www.whe.de/

The Wanne-Herner Eisenbahn und Hafen GmbH (literal: "Wanne and Herne railway and port company Ltd.") (abbr. WHE) is a railway and canal port operating company based around the Rhine-Herne Canal in the Ruhr area of Germany

== History and background ==
The port's history begins in the first decade of the 20th century with the building of the Rhine-Herne Canal. On 14 July 1905 the company Kanalhafen Wanne-Gelsenkirchen-Land is born, with the aim of making a coal port for the surrounding mines on the canal. In 1913 the nearby town of Herne also participates in the project and the companies name is changed to Hafenbetriebsgesellschaft Herne-Wanne mbH

The west harbour opened in 1914 and, a year later a narrow gauge railway Wanne-Gelsenkirchen-Land connected it to the mine Shamrock 3/4 nearby. Not long after other rail connections were made to the mines Carolinenglück in Bochum und Teutoburgia in Herne. Rapid growth of freight transport ensued with the million ton mark reached in 1916. The Bochumer Krupp-Zechen and Hibernia AG mines were connected by the port railway in the 1920s.

Originally there was a basin on the western side as part of the port, for boat manoeuvering, but this was filled in around the 1990s and now is the site of a logistics centre.

== Operations ==
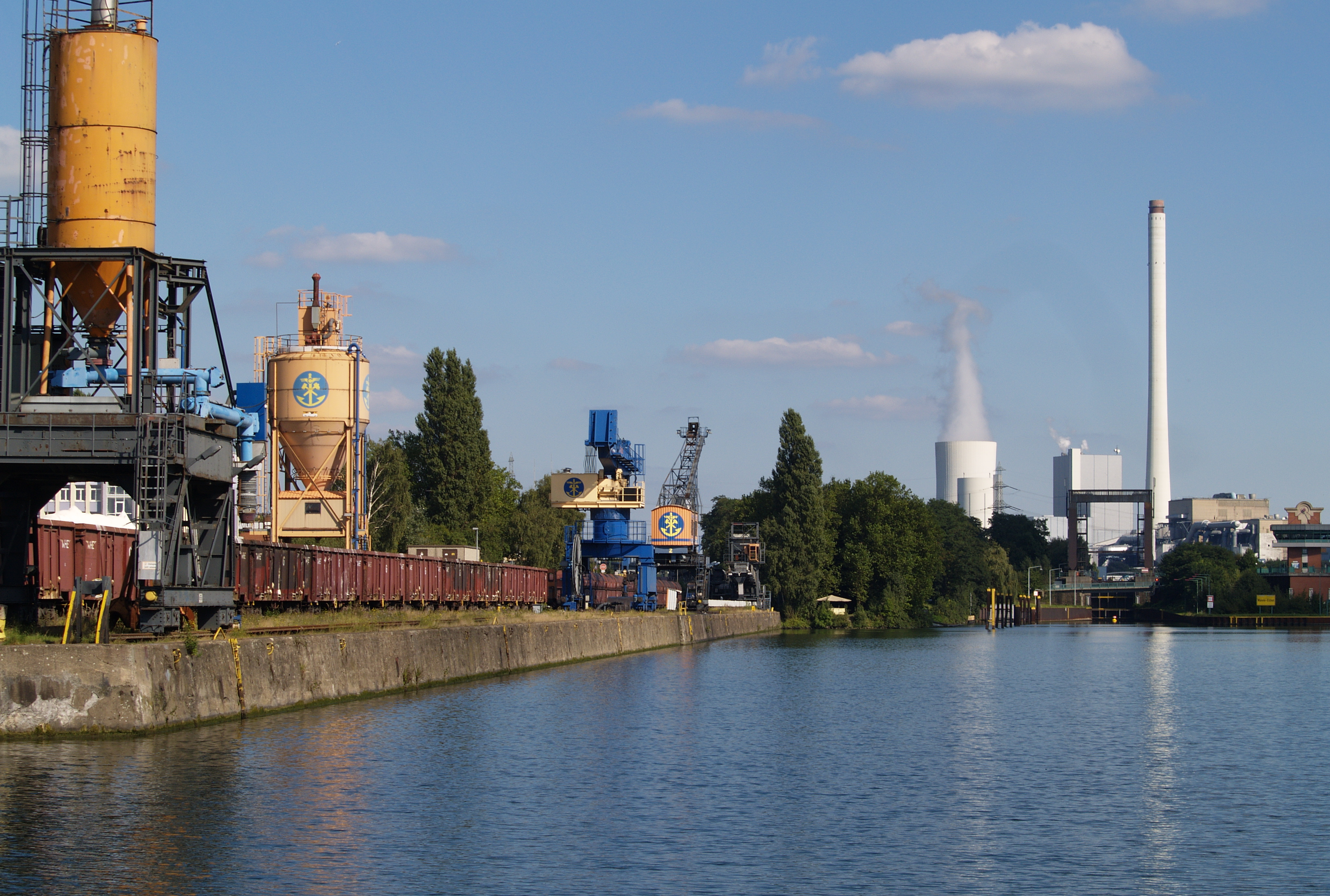
Wanne westhafen port. The Blue anchor logo on the yellow silos are the company logo (and colours) of the WHE

In the 2000s the companies primary business is still the transportation and handling of coal, along with ISO containers and other bulk products.

=== Ports ===
Both ports have rail links as well as the equipment associated with bulk cargo handling.

- Westhafen Wanne (literal: "Wanner west port"): This area is now home to a logistics centre constructed in the 1990s known as the Güterverkehrszentrum Emscher (or GVZ Emscher) with rail and road links as well as canal access, the WHE operates the rail links. This port handles coal, and intermodal traffic.
- Osthafen Wanne (literal: "Wanner port east"): Here the main cargo is scrap metal.

=== Railway ===
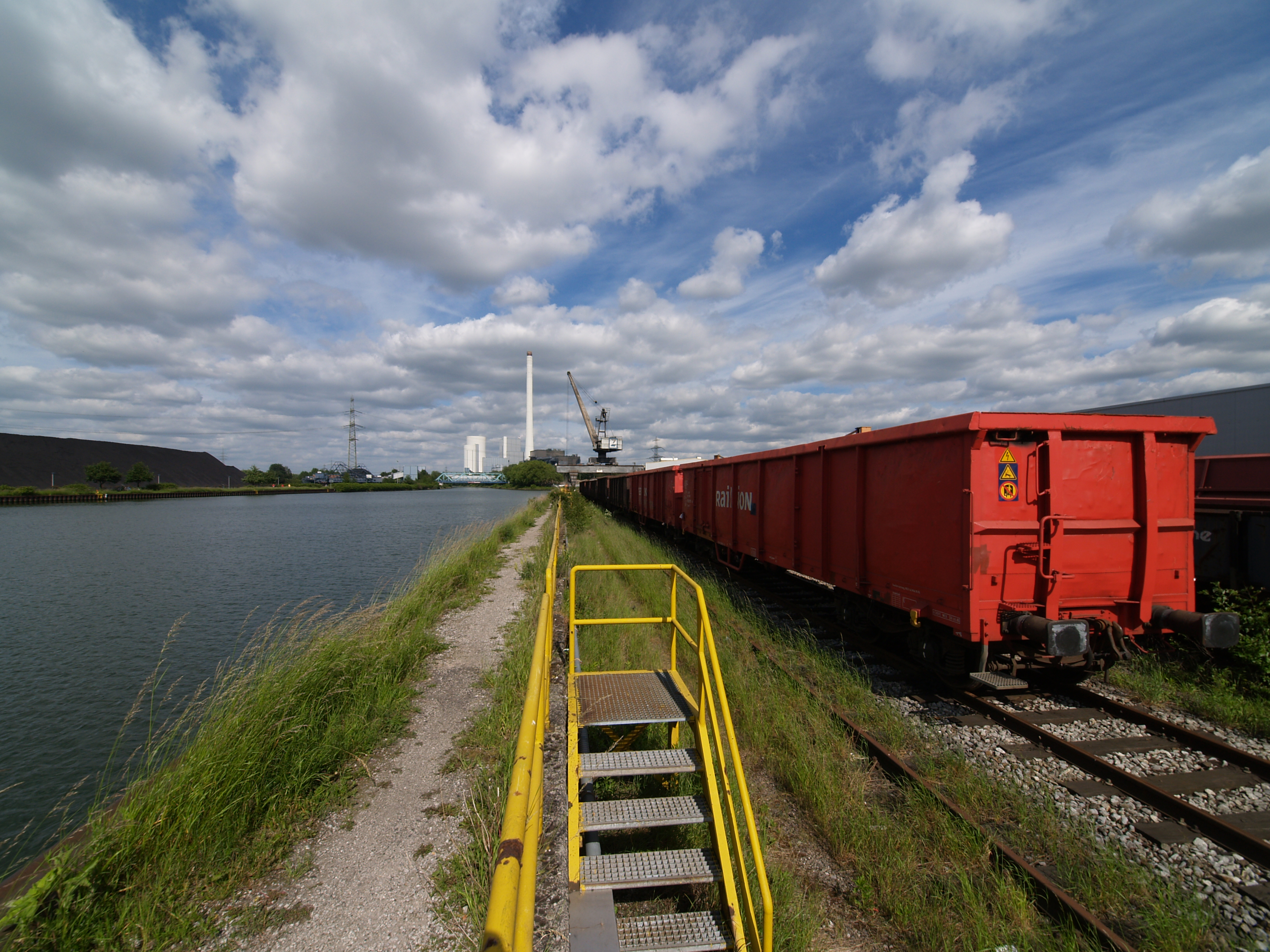
Scrap metal wagons at Wanne osthafen port

The railway has a few tens of kilometers of track, and connects to the companies own ports as well as the RAG and Deutsche Bahn rail networks. As of 2005 approximately ten locomotives are operated of the heavy shunter / freight type, with over 100 wagons, the companies workshops are located at Westhafen Wanne, and perform maintenance and repairs. In 2005 locomotives were then of MaK 1200 series type(1 MaK G 1202 BB, 2 MaK G 1204 BB), and three of the similarly specified MaK G 1600 BB (a variant of the DB V 90 series), all of around 1000 kW power, as well as some much less powerful specialised equipment (rail mobile light crane etc.)

Much of the companies rolling stock carries an orange livery with blue horizontal stripe, coal wagons carry just the letters WHE.

=== Subsidiaries ===
- BAV Aufbereitung Herne GmbH: Storage, transportation and mixing of coal blends.
- CTH Container Terminal Herne GmbH: Operates the WHE's own container terminal.

== See also ==
- List of German railway companies
