= ÖBB Class 2070 =

Austrian locomotive class

ÖBB 2070 Vossloh G800 BB
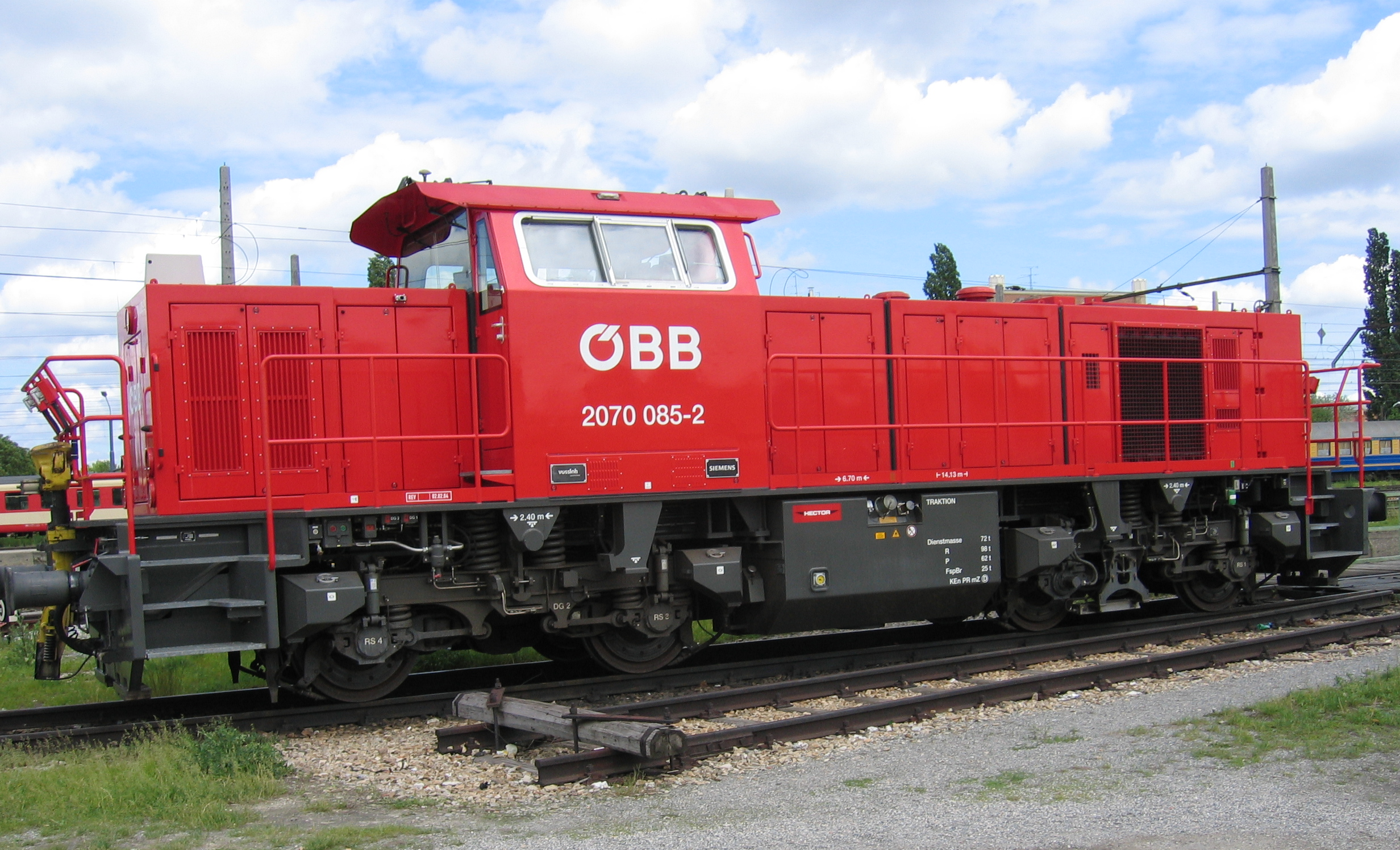
- ÖBB 2070-085 (May 2006)
Type and origin
- Power type: Diesel
- Builder: Vossloh (Kiel)
- Build date: 2000–2004
- Total produced: ÖBB 90 other 6
Specifications
- Configuration
  - UIC: B'B'
- Gauge: 1,435 mm (4 ft 8 1/2 in)
- Wheel diameter: 1,000 mm (39.37 in)/920 mm (36.22 in) (new/worn)
- Minimum curve: 80 m (262 ft)
- Wheelbase: bogie centre distance 6.700 m (21 ft 11.8 in) axle distance 2.400 m (94.49 in)
- Length: 14.130 m (46 ft 4.3 in)
- Width: 3.080 m (10 ft 1.26 in)
- Height: 4.050 m (13 ft 3.45 in)
- Loco weight: 72 t (71 long tons; 79 short tons)
- Fuel type: 3,000 L (660 imp gal; 790 US gal)
- Prime mover: CAT 3412 DITA
- Transmission: L3r4zseU2
Performance figures
- Maximum speed: 100 km/h (62 mph)
- Power output: 738 kW (990 hp); 500 kW (670 hp) (at rails)
- Tractive effort: starting 233 kN (52,000 lb_{f}) (μ=0.3)
Career
- Operators: ÖBB also industrial use
- Nicknames: Hector

The ÖBB 2070 is a class of 90 shunting and light multipurpose four axle B'B' Diesel-hydraulic locomotive built for the Austrian Federal Railways by Vossloh at the MaK locomotive plant in Kiel, Germany.

Vossloh's type designation for the locomotive class is Vossloh G800 BB. A further 6 locomotives have been built and have been part of Vossloh locomotives leasing fleet.

== ÖBB 2070 ==
The ÖBB 2070 was ordered in November 1998 as the result of a competitive tender. Along with the ÖBB Class 2068 built by Jenbacher in the 1990s they were intended to replace old shunting machines on the railway. The acquisition of the locomotives was part of a plan to modernise the Austrian locomotive fleet, which included the purchase of the ÖBB 1016 "Taurus" and ÖBB 2016 "Hercules" locomotives in the first decade of the 21st century.

The locomotives are built to the standard MaK B'B' diesel hydraulic off-centre cab design as typified by the MaK G1206. ÖBB's locomotives have air conditioned cabs and can be operated in multiple. Remote control operation as well as automatic shunting couplings are also a standard feature of the ÖBB locomotives.

== Industrial use ==
6 locomotives were produced and leased by Vossloh to other companies; primarily industrial clients including BASF, BP, Chemion Logistik GmbH (formerly part of Bayer), Ruhr Oel and Thyssen Krupp, two of the locomotives were eventually sold to Lenzing AG in 2005 and 2008.

== Miniature models ==
Versions of the locomotives have been produced by Jagerndorfer, Liliput and Märklin/Trix in HO scale, and by Minitrix in N scale.

== See also ==
- Vossloh G1000 BB, locomotive design of 2002 of higher power and based on the ÖBB 2070 design.
