= MaK G 1204 BB =

Diesel-hydraulic locomotive

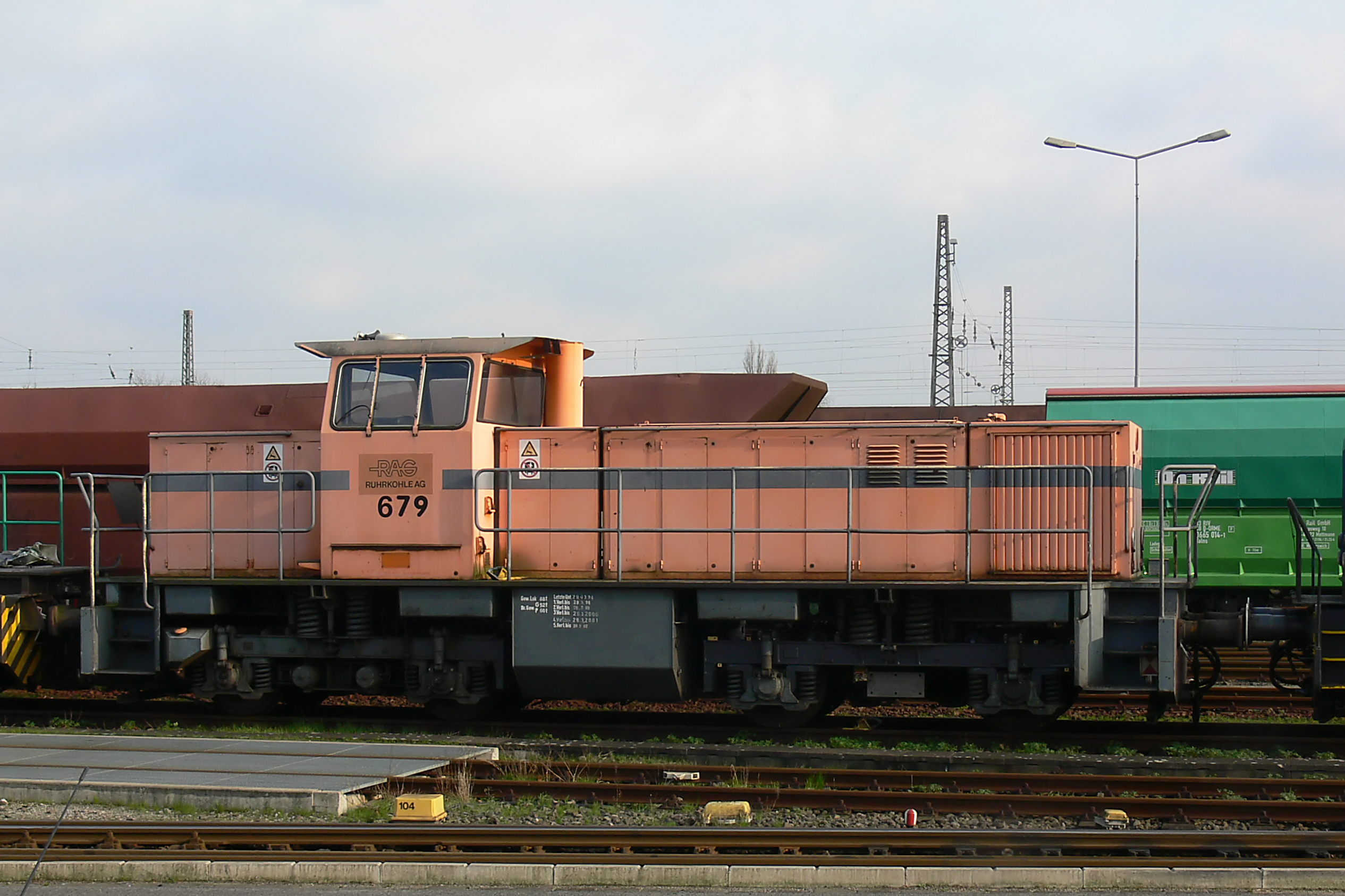
Type and origin
- Power type: Diesel-Hydraulic
- Builder: Maschinenbau Kiel (MaK)
- Build date: 1981–1991
- Total produced: 18
Specifications
- Configuration
  - UIC: B'B'
- Gauge: 1,435 mm (4 ft 8 1/2 in)
- Wheelbase: bogie centre 5.800 m (19 ft 0.3 in)
- Length: 12.500 m (41 ft 0.1 in)
- Width: 3.100 m (10 ft 2.05 in)
- Height: 4.220 m (13 ft 10.14 in)
- Loco weight: 72–88 t (71–87 long tons; 79–97 short tons)
- Fuel capacity: 2,500 L (550 imp gal; 660 US gal)
- Prime mover: MTU 12V 396 TC13
- Transmission: Voith hydraulic L5r4U2
Performance figures
- Maximum speed: 42 km/h (26 mph)-80 km/h (50 mph)
- Power output: 1,120 kW (1,500 hp)

The MaK G 1204 BB is a four axle B'B' diesel-hydraulic locomotive with and off centre cab design built by MaK in Kiel, Germany. Eighteen of these light freight and shunting locomotives were built which were used mostly on German industrial railways, two units have worked for the Swiss Federal Railways and received the class designation Am 842.

== History and design ==
The class are development of the 1978 MaK G 1202 design; both locomotives have the same exterior dimensions but the G 1204 has a 1,120 kW MTU 12V 396 of slightly increased power over the MTU 12V 331 engine used in the G 1202.

=== Operators ===
Ruhrkohle AG operated 6 of the class, Wanne-Herner Eisenbahn und Hafen 2, NIAG 2, Osthannoversche Eisenbahnen 2, Westfälische Landes-Eisenbahn 2, and Sersa of Switzerland 3, with one locomotive operating under a number of different companies.

Two units originally working for Sersa were transferred to the Swiss Federal Railways in 1993 and operate as SBB Am 842.000 and SBB Am 842.001.

== See also ==
- List of stock used by Swiss Federal Railways
- MaK G 1206, higher powered development.
