= UIRR =

European organization promoting intermodal transport

UIRR logo

The UIRR, short for "Union internationale pour le transport combiné Rail-Route" (or: International Union for Road-Rail combined transport) is a European organisation promoting intermodal transport. It was founded in 1970, and celebrated its 40th anniversary at a conference in Brussels.

The UIRR is a partner of the UIC. It has participated in various projects on modal shift, emissions reduction, rail market liberalisation, and environmental issues.

The UIRR was founded by eight intermodal transport companies, and its membership now includes 19 businesses across Europe.

The UIRR is a member of the Group of Representative Bodies.

== Members ==
- UIRR membership has been dynamically developing - following in the footsteps of the development of European intermodal transport sector. The actual list of UIRR members can be found here: http://www.uirr.com/en/our-members/members.html
