= SBB Cargo =

Freight focused subsidiary of Swiss Federal Railways

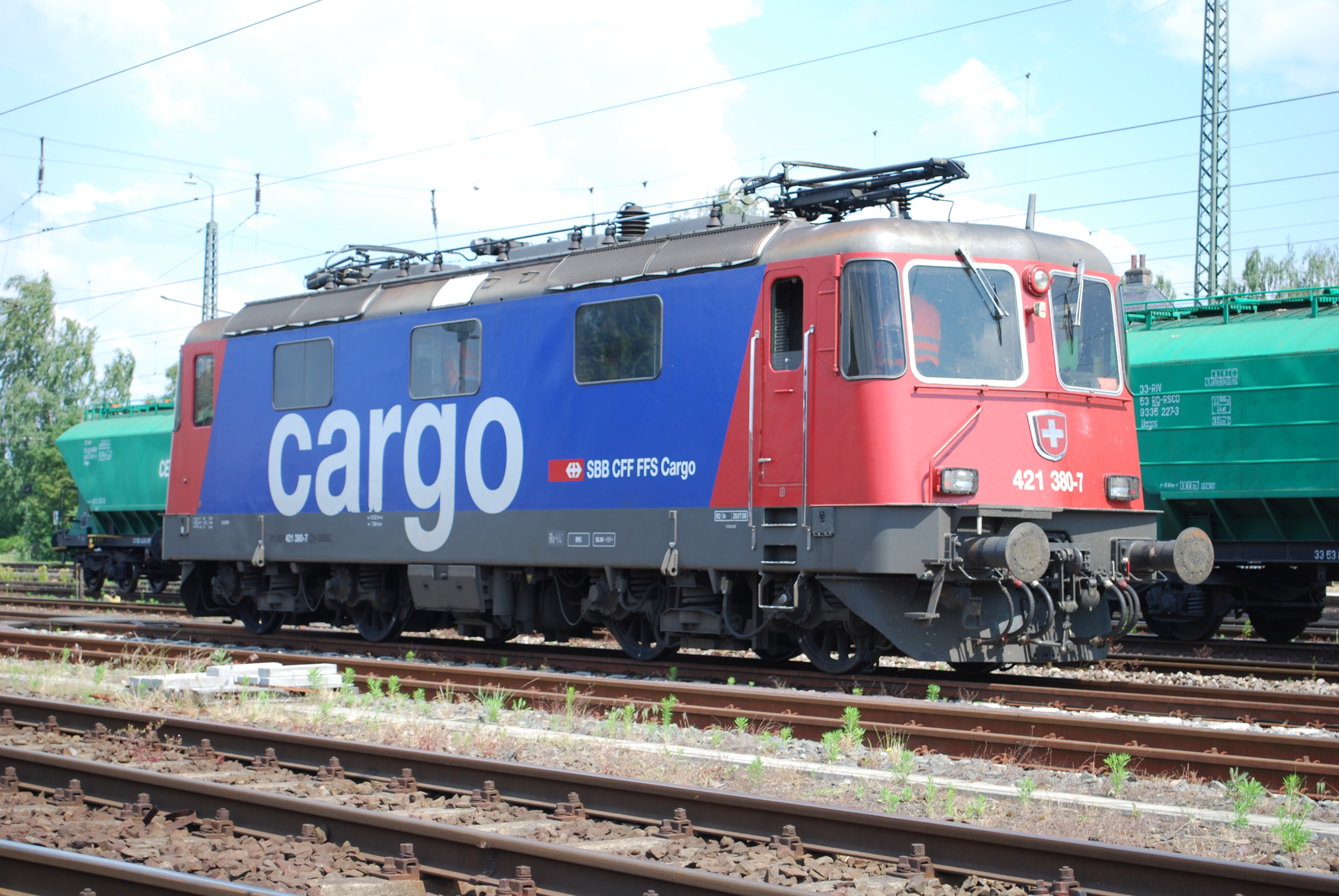
- Re 421 locomotive of SBB Cargo
- Trade name: SBB CFF FFS Cargo
- Native name: German: SBB Cargo AG; French: CFF Cargo SA; Italian: FFS Cargo SA
- Industry: Rail Transport
- Founded: 1999; 27 years ago
- Headquarters: Olten, Switzerland
- Key people: Désirée Baer, CEO
- Number of employees: 2,178 (2022)
- Parent: Swiss Federal Railways
- Website: www.sbbcargo.com

Container train from SBB Cargo on its way to Italy.

Development of the Eem 923 hybrid locomotive

Freight train from SBB Cargo runs through the Alps.

SBB Cargo is a subsidiary of Swiss Federal Railways (SBB) specialising in railfreight and is operated as the Freight division. Swiss Federal Railways is a former state-owned and -controlled company that was transformed in 1999 into a joint-stock company under special legislation following the first Swiss railway reform and divided up into three independent divisions: Passenger, Freight and Infrastructure. The headquarters of Swiss Federal Railways SBB Cargo AG, the Freight division's official designation, are in Olten. In 2013, SBB Cargo had 3,061 employees and achieved consolidated sales of CHF 953 million. In Switzerland, SBB Cargo is the market leader in rail freight, transporting over 175,000 tons of goods every day.

The company is headed by Désirée Baer. SBB Cargo is mandated by its owner, the Swiss Confederation, to contribute to the modal shift from road to rail. In the "Cargo Switzerland" business area, it is required – as system leader – to operate a wagonload freight network both within Switzerland and on the import/export routes. This network must be aligned to the needs of Swiss business and cover its own costs. The "Cargo International" business area focuses on providing competitive and profitable traction services for intermodal and block trains on the main north–south transit corridor.

SBB Cargo is an active member of the Xrail alliance, which was founded by seven European freight railways in February 2010 with the aim of making international wagonload rail transport more customer-friendly and efficient.

== Strategic direction ==
Railfreight is a major topic of debate in the Swiss political arena at present. In 2011, Parliament passed a motion ordering the government to submit a master plan for the future of rail freight across the country. The Federal Council did this in mid-April 2013. The draft is expected to be submitted to Parliament in spring 2015. Because a referendum is still possible, the new legislative package will enter into force in 2016 at the earliest and include a restructuring of railfreight's general operating conditions. At the same time, SBB Cargo is pursuing a three-pronged strategy:

- The subsidiary SBB Cargo International, jointly founded at the beginning of 2011 with the intermodal transport operator Hupac, operates shuttle trains on the north–south transit routes.
- In wagonload freight transport, the aim is to lower the structural costs and slim down the network of service points.
- SBB Cargo's future intermodal freight offerings will include scheduled services connecting Switzerland's major cities.

== SBB Cargo Switzerland ==
At 5.2 billion net tonne-kilometres, SBB Cargo’s traffic performance in 2013 was slightly higher than the previous year’s figure (5.0 billion). With the realignment of production networks, fleet and administration, the cost structure has also seen significant improvements, and SBB Cargo has won new customers despite a slimmed-down network of service points. Two new routes for intermodal transport were opened and preliminary work began on one more.

To keep wagonload freight in Switzerland profitable and sustainable, solutions for restructuring poorly utilised service points have been devised over recent years. Overall, SBB Cargo looked into restructuring 155 very poorly utilised service points. On average, less than one wagon a day is processed at these locations. Of the very poorly utilised points, 128 have no longer been in operation since the timetable change in December 2012. The current services of SBB Cargo and the other railways in Switzerland regularly run to over 300 service points for wagonload freight. Despite this, over 98% of the existing freight volume will continue to be carried by rail.

As their locomotives will no longer have to scale the gradients as they climb to 1,100 metres at the start of the current Gotthard Tunnel, freight trains will be able to grow to up to 750 metres in length depending on their load. The tunnel interior is also high enough to accommodate the four-metre-high trailers of articulated lorries, travelling straight through the Alps by train in 35 to 40 minutes. SBB is currently creating a four-metre corridor on the approximately 270-kilometre-long Gotthard line between Basel and the Italian border on behalf of the Swiss government, to be completed by 2020. Around 20 tunnels will need to be modified in order to ensure that semitrailers with a four-metre headroom can be transported on rail wagons. Changes will also need to be made to some 80 platform roofs and sets of signals.

In Switzerland, freight traffic is handled at the three large marshalling (shunting) yards at Basel-Muttenz, Zurich-Limmattal and Lausanne-Triage. These marshalling yards are currently operated by SBB Infrastructure. From January 2015, SBB Cargo will take over responsibility for planning and production at the domestic marshalling yards in Limmattal and Lausanne on behalf of SBB Infrastructure. SBB Cargo will therefore now be responsible for the entire production process for freight traffic – from collecting the freight wagons from the customer and shunting them in the marshalling yard right through to delivering them to the recipients. However, SBB Infrastructure will retain responsibility for the marshalling yards themselves, remain the contact partner for rail transport activities and continue to ensure the provision of traffic control, thus guaranteeing equal treatment.

== SBB Cargo Germany ==
SBB Cargo Deutschland GmbH, headquartered in Duisburg (Germany) and founded in 2002, is a wholly owned subsidiary of SBB Cargo International, operating as its German production company. As a registered railway company for freight services, it plans, schedules and operates block trains in Germany to and from Duisburg, Rheinhausen, Siegen, Cologne, Aachen, Ludwigshafen/Mannheim, Karlsruhe, Stuttgart, Freiburg im Breisgau, Singen, Lübeck, Bremerhaven/Bremen, Hamburg, Kehl, Gelsenkirchen, Ingolstadt, Neuss, Gießen/Mainzlar and Weil am Rhein, while rail-to-road platforms in Germany are operated in Bremen, Duisburg, Karlsruhe, Worms and Weil am Rhein.

SBB Cargo Deutschland has been a recognized training organization since October 30, 2007.

== SBB Cargo Italy ==
SBB Cargo Italia was founded in 2003 and has its operational base in Gallarate. The company is a wholly owned subsidiary of SBB Cargo International, operating as its Italian production company and plans, schedules and operates freight trains in Italy. It also provides training for locomotive drivers. The destinations/departure points for wagon groups or block trains in Italy are Gallarate, Novara, Milano, Melzo, Trecate, Turin-Orbassano, Fossano, Poggio Rusco and Sant'Ilario. Centres for rail-to-road transshipment in Italy are operated in Desio and Turin.

== ChemOil Logistics AG ==
ChemOil Logistics AG was founded in 1999 as a subsidiary of SBB Cargo. The company is part of a European logistics network and chiefly provides services for customers in the chemical and petroleum sectors. ChemOil's core competency is in the organisation and execution of door-to-door freight forwarding using all available modes of transport. In addition ChemOil provides its customers with a wide range of complementary services on request, such as managing wagon fleets, analysing procedures and processes and advising on how to optimise the supply chain.

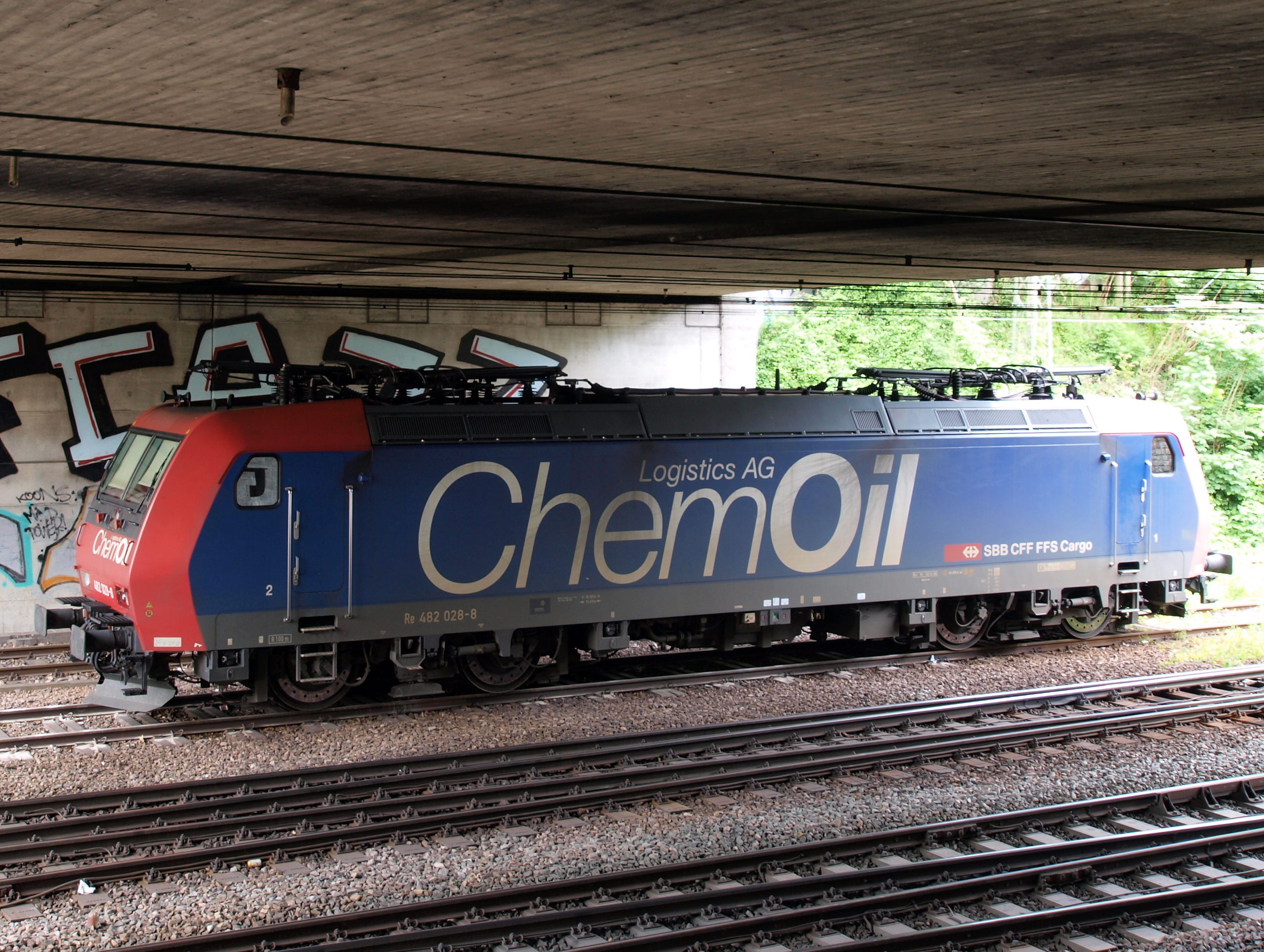

Since 2011, the company's ChemLink product has connected key chemicals centres along the north–south corridor using its own scheduled service for consignment handling.

== Services ==
SBB Cargo divides its services into the following categories: door-to-door logistics concepts with wagonloads (Cargo Rail and Cargo Express products), block trains (Cargo Train product) and international intermodal transport (traction services for intermodal shuttle trains of all the main operators such as Hupac, ERS, ICF, IFB and T.R.W.). Standard products as well as individual solutions are offered. The “Rail & Transfer” service within Switzerland is aimed at forwarders and companies who have their own truck dispatching facilities. “Swiss Split” is the connection system for imports and exports in international intermodal freight services in Switzerland.

SBB Cargo provides the daily feeder service and local distribution of intermodal load units – for example containers and interchangeable containers – between the sidings of Swiss businesses and the country's international shuttle terminals. Since September 2011 SBB Cargo offers a rail shuttle between the Basel container terminal and Chavornay for transporting overseas containers. By expanding intermodal transport in Switzerland, SBB Cargo is adding to its existing business in wagonload and transit freight. The concept envisages scheduled trains connecting the main centres in Switzerland. Shuttle trains will go back and forth according to a fixed timetable. The first pilot train has been operating on a fixed timetable twice a day between Dietikon near Zurich and Renens near Lausanne since the beginning of 2012. Since September 2012, SBB Cargo has also been running a scheduled train with refrigerated containers for Migros between Neuendorf (Canton Solothurn) and Gossau (Canton St. Gallen). In June 2013 the north–south shuttle between Dietikon and Cadenazzo started running on workdays, connecting the economic centre of Zurich with the Ticino region, with an extension to Lugano Vedeggio.

In order to manage growing volumes of container traffic for imports and exports, a new terminal for transshipment between ships, rail and lorries is being constructed in northern Basel in close proximity to the Rhine port at Basel-Kleinhüningen. An initial step for transshipment between rail and road is planned for completion by the end of 2016. However, plans for the Limmattal Gateway near Zurich – a new large-scale terminal for trains of up to 750 metres in length – have been postponed. No action is currently being taken with regard to these plans and the planning approval procedure has been shelved.[16] In mediation proceedings instigated by the FOT, however, the logistics industry has agreed that the possibility of building a gateway in Limmattal should definitely be kept open. In order to continue to meet the requirements of the regional economy in the future, the transshipment centre for intermodal transport in Dietikon is to be expanded and upgraded.

SBB Cargo works together with the international climate protection organisation Myclimate to offer its customers a completely climate-neutral transport service. The inevitable CO_{2} emissions of a shipment by train are neutralised by climate protection measures elsewhere. Unlike other similar schemes, the SBB Cargo concept takes all environmentally harmful emissions and the entire life cycle of the consignment into account when calculating the environmental impact. Since the beginning of 2009, the Swiss railfreight operator has also been providing its customers with individual emission reports. The emissions comparison for all consignments forwarded by SBB Cargo can easily be integrated into operational environmental management systems and presented in environmental audits.

Since the 2013/2014 timetable change, SBB Cargo has been transporting a significant portion of DB Schenker Rail’s transit services through Switzerland. Thanks to these additional operational and traction services, Swiss rail freight has been able to make better use of its existing production capacities and resources.

== Rolling stock ==
In 2013, SBB Cargo had 7360 freight wagons in service (of which 6677 were low-noise vehicles). SBB Cargo purchased 50 Re 482 dual-voltage freight locomotives for its Switzerland-Germany services, 15 of which can also be operated in Austria. SBB Cargo uses dual-voltage locomotives for its Switzerland-Italy services: 21 Re 484 locomotives and 12 Re 474 locomotives. In total, 495 traction vehicles were in service during 2013. For its freight services in Switzerland and Germany, SBB Cargo uses 45 Am 843 diesel shunters with environment-friendly soot particle filters. These locomotives help improve the production efficiency of heavy shunting operations and are equipped with radio remote-control systems. The Biel works uses an additional 45 modernised Tm IV shunting tractors. After the refit, the shunting tractors will be classified as type Tm 232.

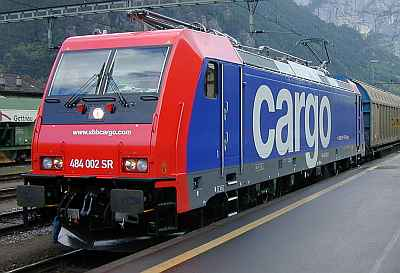

In summer 2010, SBB Cargo ordered 30 new two-axle hybrid locomotives (type Eem 923 Hybrid) from Stadler Winterthur AG to replace the Bm 4/4 shunting locomotives and various three-axle shunting locomotives used for light freight duties for wagonload traffic, since the old locomotives no longer met current requirements in terms of age, cost-effectiveness and performance. The newly developed model is based on the Ee 922 shunting locomotive which SB already uses for shunting duties in its Passenger division. The hybrid version for SBB Cargo has an electric motor and an auxiliary diesel engine for use on non-electrified sidings. The Eem 923 hybrid has a maximum speed of 120 km/h. In late February 2014, the last of the Eem 923 locomotives to be ordered was christened “Chestenberg” in Lupfig and put into operation.

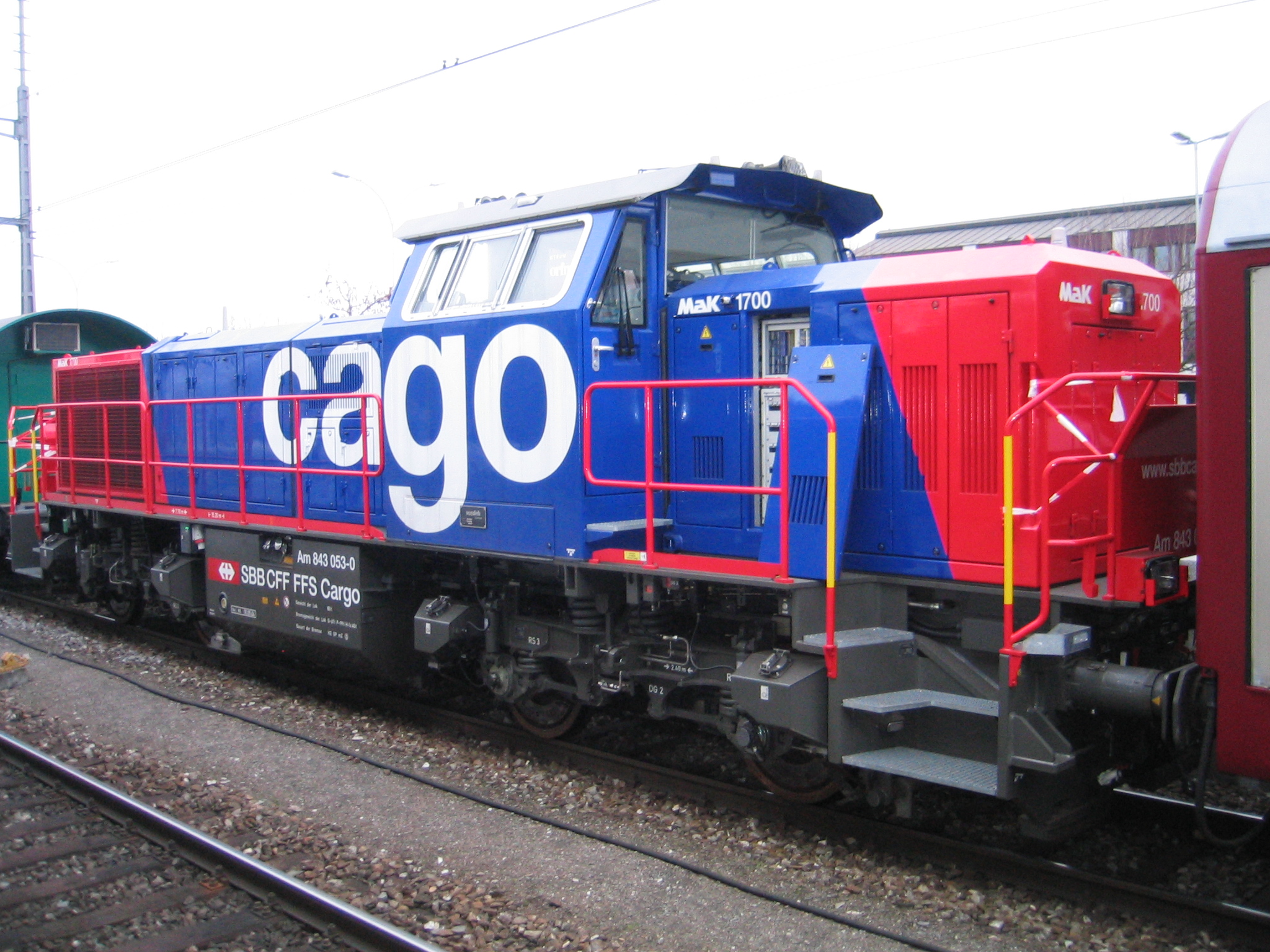

== Key figures ==
In 2013, SBB Cargo earned consolidated operating revenues of CHF 953 million and carried a traffic volume of 12.3 billion net tonne-kilometres. For the first time in over 40 years, the company achieved positive revenues of CHF 14.7 million following a loss of CHF 51.2 million in the previous year. Traffic revenues increased to CHF 857 million from CHF 822 million in 2012.

The positive trend has also continued throughout the first half of 2014: total traffic volume for goods transported in Switzerland increased significantly by 27% to 7.6 billion net tonne-kilometres (previous year: 6.0 billion). This is primarily due to new traffic in the north-south corridor. Compared to the same period in the previous year, revenues increased from CHF 3 million to CHF 15 million. At SBB Cargo International, new traffic and increases in productivity led to positive figures for the first time, with a profit of CHF 1.1 million being generated, up by CHF 3.9 million on the first half of 2013.

== Investment in subsidiaries ==
In addition to its 75% share in SBB Cargo International, SBB Cargo holds the entire share capital of ChemOil Logistics AG in Basel (transportation of chemicals and petroleum products) and minority interests in RAlpin AG, Berne (30%), Hupac SA, Chiasso (23.85%) and Termini SA, Chiasso (20%).

Source: SBB Cargo Annual Report 2013 (PDF; 3 MB)
