= EHG =

EHG may refer to

- Eastern Hunter-Gatherer, an archaeogenetic lineage
- Eyehategod
- Ezdan Holding Group, a Qatari holding company
- Hagen Hauptbahnhof, a railway station in Hagen, Germany
- EH Güterverkehr, a subsidiary of Eisenbahn und Häfen GmbH
- Eskualdeko Hiri Garraioa, the Pamplona city transport
