= Belgian Railways Class 77 =

SNCB/NMBS 77
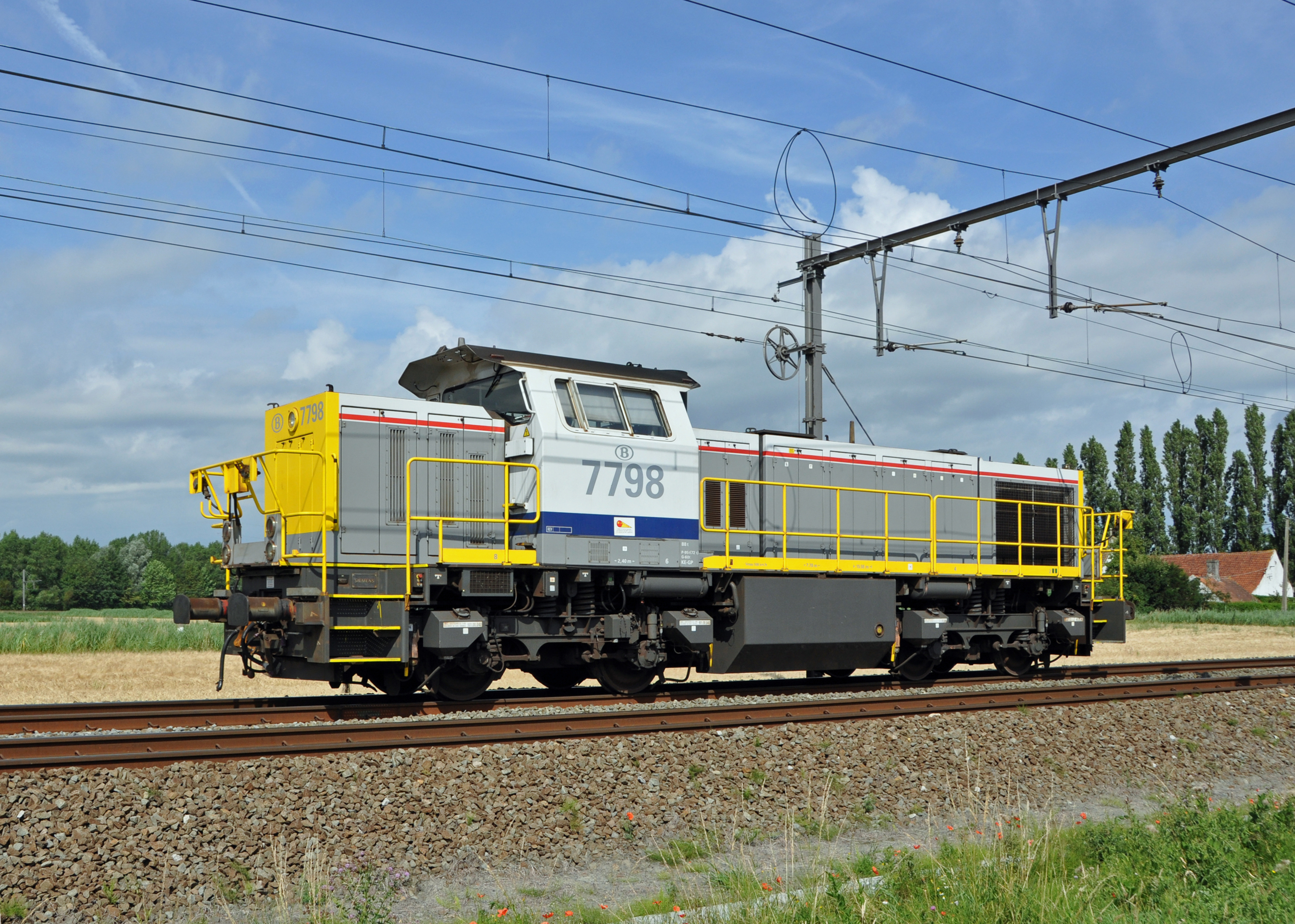
- Diesel locomotive #7798 of the Belgian State Railways (SNCB – NMBS), 2010
Type and origin
- Power type: Diesel
- Builder: Vossloh Schienentechnik/Vossloh Locomotives
- Serial number: 1000918 – 1001007; 1001217 – 1001296
- Build date: 1999–2005
- Total produced: 170
Specifications
- Configuration
  - UIC: B'B'
- Gauge: 1,435 mm (4 ft 8 1/2 in) standard gauge
- Wheel diameter: 1,000 mm (39.37 in) (new)
- Minimum curve: 75 m (246.06 ft)
- Wheelbase: bogie centre distance 7.770 m (25 ft 5.9 in) axle distance 2.400 m (7 ft 10.5 in)
- Length: 15.590 m (51 ft 1 3/4 in)
- Width: 3.052 m (10 ft 1/8 in)
- Height: 4.220 m (13 ft 10 1/8 in)
- Loco weight: 90 t (88.6 long tons; 99.2 short tons)
- Fuel capacity: 4,200 L (920 imp gal; 1,100 US gal)
- Prime mover: Anglo Belgian Corporation 6DZC-1000-144A
- Engine type: V6
- Alternator: Auxiliary 3 phase 65–130 kW
- Cylinders: 6
- Transmission: Voith Hydraulic L4r4zseU2a
- Loco brake: pneumatic (Knorr-Bremse)
Performance figures
- Maximum speed: 100 or 60 km/h (62 or 37 mph)
- Power output: 1,150 kW (1,540 hp)
- Tractive effort: 210–265 kN (47,000–60,000 lbf)
Career
- Operators: SNCB/NMBS
- Class: 77
- Numbers: 7701–7870
- Disposition: in service

The NMBS/SNCB Class 77 (also known as HLD 77 or HLR 77) is a class of 4 axle B'B' road switcher diesel hydraulic locomotive designed for shunting and freight work manufactured at the beginning of the 2000s by Vossloh Schienentechnik/Vossloh Locomotives at the Maschinenbau Kiel plant in Kiel, Germany for the National Railway Company of Belgium (SNCB/NMBS).

== Background and design ==
The initial order for 90 locomotives was given to Siemens in 1997 to replace an aging diesel fleet; the railway opted for a locomotive suitable for both shunting and mainline use, rather than separate classes. Siemens sold its locomotive manufacturer division (Siemens Schienenfahrzeugtechnik) to Vossloh in 1998.

The locomotives were variants of the standard MaK G 1200 series design, and are considered a development of the MaK G 1205 type. The locomotive is an off-centre cab design with a two-speed Voith hydraulic transmission driving all axles via cardan shafts. Auxiliary electrical supply is provided by an engine mounted alternator. Unlike many other MaK locomotives which use a MTU or CAT 12-cylinder V engine the locomotive has an ABC 6-cylinder inline engine.

The first locomotive was delivered in October 1999, and worked satisfactorily; a second order for 80 locomotives was given in June 2001.

== Operations ==
The first locomotive entered service in February 2004. All 170 units were operational by June 2005.

Due to its relatively low power the locomotives work in multiple on heavy freight trains.

=== Equipment variations ===
Sets of the class vary in the type of equipment they carry:

NMBS/SNCB number	Radio control	Cab Radio	ATB	Notes
7701–7708	Yes	Yes	No	Fitted with automatic coupler for hill shunting; not approved for Netherlands
7709–7728	Yes	Yes	No	Approved for limited operations in Netherlands
7729–7770	No	Yes	No	Approved for limited operations in Netherlands
7771–7790	No	Yes	Yes	Approved for Netherlands and Germany (2004); fitted with PZB system
7791–7865	No	No	No	Can operate in Netherlands when in multiple with locos with ATB or radio
7866–7870	No	~	Yes	Fitted with ATB and PZB in 2008 for work in Germany (Iron Rhine line)

== See also ==
- NS Class 6400 similar concept diesel electric freight locomotives built by MaK/Siemens between 1988 and 1995 for the railways of the Netherlands.
