= MaK / Vossloh G1206 =

Diesel-hydraulic locomotive

MaK G 1206 / Vossloh G 1206
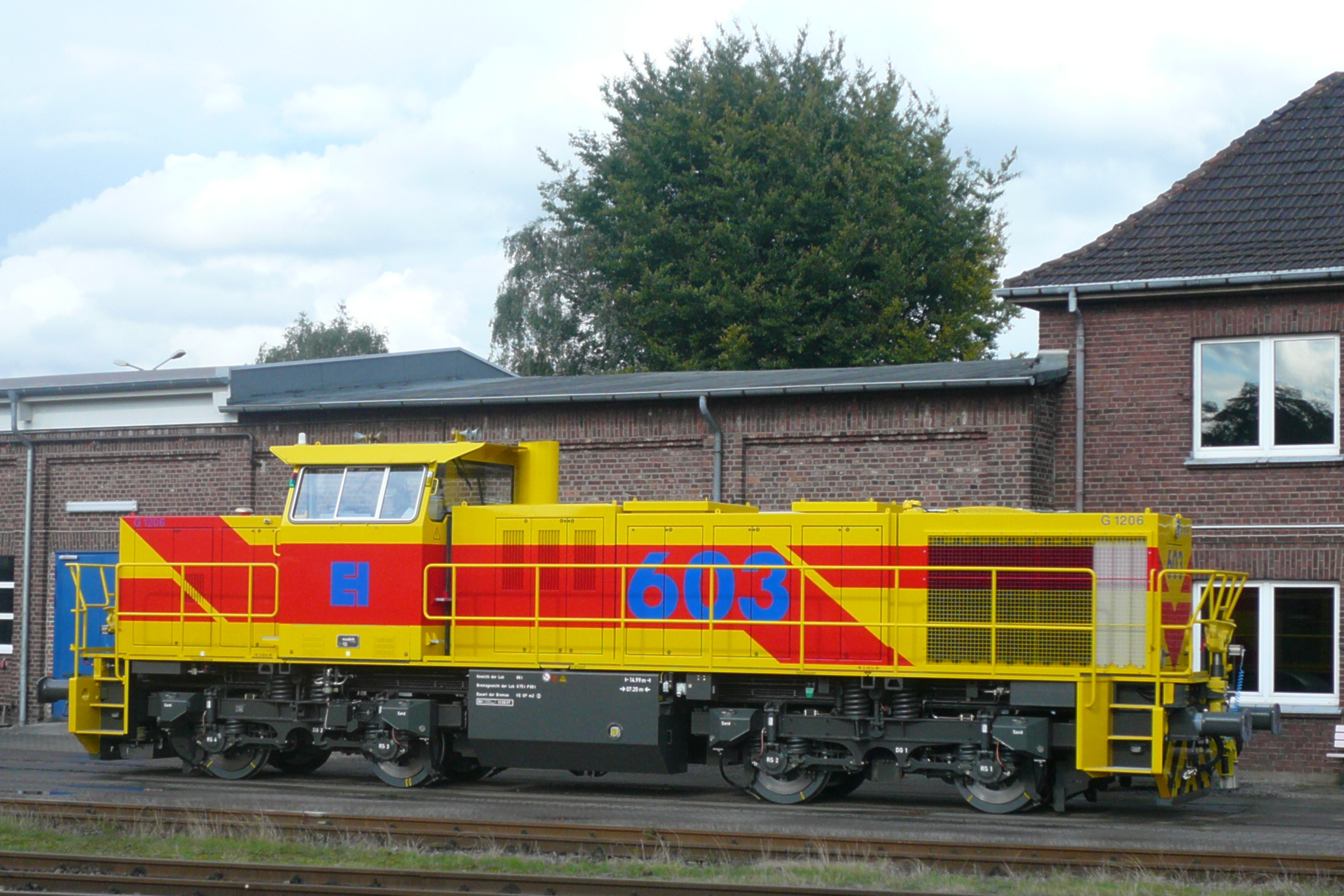
- MaK 1206-2 diesel hydraulic locomotive, number 603 of the Eisenbahn und Häfen
Type and origin
- Power type: Diesel-hydraulic
- Builder: MaK / Vossloh in Kiel
- Build date: G 1206: 1997–2016; G 1206-2: 2007–2011
- Total produced: G 1206: 343; G 1206-2: 11
Specifications
- Configuration
  - UIC: B′B′
- Gauge: 1,435 mm (4 ft 8 1/2 in)
- Wheel diameter: 1,000 mm (39.37 in) (new); 920 mm (36.22 in) (new/worn)
- Length: 14.70 m (48 ft 3 in)
- Width: 3.08 m (10 ft 1 in)
- Height: 4.22 m (13 ft 10 in)
- Loco weight: G 1206: 80–90 t (79–89 long tons; 88–99 short tons); G 1206-2: 84–90 t (83–89 long tons; 93–99 short tons)
- Fuel capacity: G1206 3,500 L (770 imp gal; 920 US gal); G1206-2 3,150 L (690 imp gal; 830 US gal)
- Prime mover: G 1206: CAT 3512 B DITA-SC or MTU 12 V 4000 R41 also MTU 16V 396 TC14 */*** or MTU TC14 12 V 4000 R20 ** G 1206-2: CAT 3508 B DITA-SC
- Cylinders: G 1206: V16 (or V12 **) G 1206-2: 8
- Transmission: Hydraulic G 1206: Voith L5r4zU2 also Voith L5r4zseU2 *** G 1206-2: Voith L4r4zeU2
- Loco brake: Wheel disc brake, hydrodynamic brake optional
Performance figures
- Maximum speed: G 1206: 60 km/h (37 mph)/100 km/h (62 mph) with Voith L5r4zseU2 transmission *** 100 km/h (62 mph) Caterpillar engine and L5r4zU2 transmission also 90 km/h (56 mph) with MTU engine and Voith L54rzU2 transmission */** G 1206-2: 50 km/h (31 mph)
- Power output: G 1206: 1,500 kW (2,000 hp) or 1,570 kW (2,110 hp) with MTU 16V 396 TC14 */*** G 1206-2: 920 kW (1,230 hp)
- Tractive effort: 282 kN (63,000 lb_{f}) (starting with 87.3 t loco @ μ=0.33)
Career
- Locale: Europe

The Vossloh G1206 is a B'B' diesel hydraulic freight locomotive built in Kiel and used by several European railway operators including a SNCF specific variant the BB 461000 series.

The design was created in the mid-1990s by Maschinenbau Kiel (MaK) for German coal supplier RAG Aktiengesellschaft and is a follow-on to the MaK G1205 locomotive class built as the SNCB Class 77. Production continued under Vossloh ownership of the Kiel plant

In 2007 a shunting specific variant, the G1206-2 was created and began production.

Four Caterpillar-engined locomotives hired from Angel Trains Cargo by Euro Cargo Rail were assigned to TOPS Class 21 due to their presence at times on the UK side of the channel tunnel. ECR assigned the codes FB1544 to FB1547 to these locomotives.

== History and design ==
In the 1990s the de-monopolisation and liberalisation of the railways of member states of the European Union meant that private companies could access formerly state-owned track. With this came numerous private operators running locomotives on the main line for the first time. MaK had previously been quite successful in providing freight locomotives for industrial use to various companies. The G 1201 and G 1205 models (and intermediate variants) had been examples of the type of locomotives larger private companies had used. These locomotives were suitable for pulling fairly heavy freight consists as well as shunting. However track access charges (as well as the necessity not to interrupt passenger trains) meant that on the main lines freight trains must run much faster than they did in an industrial environment.

As a consequence Vossloh introduced the G 1206; it was based on the G 1205 but was substantially more powerful allowing it to pull freight trains at a higher speed (or simply pull heavier trains). Thus the 12-cylinder engine of the G 1205 was replaced with a 16-cylinder engine, because of this along with the increase size of the auxiliary equipment required the new locomotive was almost 2 metres longer than its 1,180 kW (1,580 hp) predecessor.

The cab is situated approximately above one of the bogies, with doors opening onto walkways on both sides along the rest of the locomotive; the external design is functional, with flat steels and right angles predominating.

=== Variants and orders ===
The initial versions had a MTU engine (the 16 V 396 TC14); two variants were built either with or without a two-speed Voith transmission - versions with the two-speed transmissions had a lower gear limiting the maximum speed to ~60 km/h (37 mph) but giving greater torque.

The initial order from RAG had single speed transmission - 11 were built; the top speed was limited to 80 km/h (50 mph).

A further four machines were built with a single gear transmission otherwise identical design except for the use of a 12-cylinder engine from MTU of almost equal power to the previous 16-cylinder version; these were for Dortmunder Eisenbahn GmbH (literally Dortmund railway). They were numbered 401 to 404, number 403 can be seen here in action in its green and yellow livery:

Six units were built with the speed transmission for the Banverket (Swedish Rail Administration) for delivery to Borlänge In addition to modifications for cold weather operation the running gear has steering rods fitted enabling a higher top speed of 100 km/h (62 mph).

The design then underwent further improvement; the improved bogies used in the machines for Banverket were made standard with improvements to the axlebox. A 12-cylinder engine of 1,500 kW (2,000 hp) was used but from Caterpillar instead of the MTU engine used the machines built for Dortmunder Eisenbahn GmbH. With these changes the basic design of the main tranche of G 1206's was complete.

The introduction of the Caterpillar engine led to a slight change in external appearance - previously the fore and aft sections had been practically identical in height, but to accommodate the Caterpillar engine the 'fore' (longer) section was raised slightly.

This model was used by SNCF as the BB 461000, as well as numerous private operators. Many of the locomotives produced are owned by Alpha Trains, with a further significant number owned by Mitsui Rail Capital, both these companies lease the locomotives to private operators, sometimes for short periods of time. They have been used all over Europe: In Germany, Austria, Switzerland, Luxembourg, Italy, Spain and the Netherlands.

In April 2006, another variant was produced, this time for Seco Rail, the engine specified was the MTU 12V 4000 R41 which was the type meeting the European emissions standards at that time. The two-speed hydraulic transmission from Voith (L54r zseU2) was used again - giving a top speed of 60 or 100 km/h (37 or 62 mph) depending on gear. The locomotives were equipped for use in France.

==== Summary ====
| Owner | Engine | Transmission | Number | Comments |
|---|---|---|---|---|
| RAG Aktiengesellschaft | MTU 16V 396 TC14 | Voith L5r4zU2 | 11 | Built 1997–1998 |
| Dortmunder Eisenbahn | MTU 12V 4000 R20 | Voith L5r4zU2 | 4 | Built 1998–1999 with 1,500 kW (2,000 hp) 12-cylinder MTU engine |
| Banverket | MTU 16V 396 TC14 | Voith L5r4zeU2 | 6 | Built 1998–1999, modifications to running gear allow 100 km/h (62 mph) top speed Low gear for increased torque, cold weather modifications |
| Various | CAT 3512 B DITA-SC | Voith L5r4zU2 | 23 | SNCF BB 461000 : Modifications to braking system with two brake control units instead of one. Improved electric current flow across the wheels for track occupancy safety systems (included wheel tread cleaning system). Approved for use in France and Germany. |
| Various | CAT 3512 B DITA-SC | Voith L5r4zU2 | 89 | Various private operators including Railion, Hoyer Railserv GmbH, Nordbayerische Eisenbahngesellschaft mbH, Westfälische Landes-Eisenbahn GmbH (WLE), Spitzke Logistik GmbH (SLG), Hoyer, Rail4chem, Européenne de Travaux Ferroviaires SA (ETF), Veolia cargo, Bayerische Cargo Bahn GmbH, Strukton Railinfra Materieel B.V, ACTS Nederland B.V, ERS Railways B.V., Connex Cargo Logistics and others |
| Seco Rail; Colas Rail | MTU 12V 4000 R41 | Voith L5r4zeU2 | 24+ | 20 for Seco Rail, 4 for Colas Rail |

=== G1206-2 ===
The G1206-2 is a shunting variant of the G1206 with a smaller (920 kW or 1,230 hp) engine and transmission. Because of the smaller engine only one cooling fan is needed - this is the only external difference between this type and its 'big sister'. Operators include Eisenbahn und Häfen GmbH (~7 units), Dillinger Hüttenwerke (1 unit), Ruhr Oel GmbH (also used by BP Gelsenkirchen GmbH) (1 unit).

== Models of the G1206 ==
Models of the G1206 have been produced in HO scale by Mehano, Märklin and PIKO, and in N scale by Piko. Trix/Minitrix has also produced G1206 models in HO and N scales using operator's liveries' applied on similar models of MaK/Vossloh machines such as their reproductions of NS Class 6400, or MaK G 1205.

== References and notes ==
=== Other sources ===
- VSFT G1206 BB Technical and operator details, as well as images of Private company liveried locomotives.
- G 1206 and G 1206-2 technical pamphlet from vossloh-locomotives.com
- G 1205/G 1206/DLL Info Banverket G-series jarnvag.net
- Die G1206 in Deutschland und Frankreich Images with descriptions of G1206 in Germany and France from nahnejohannsen.de (German)
- Diesel Lok G 1206 Images of G1206 in Luxembourg from rail.lu
