= Tadawul Holding Group =

Private Qatari holding company

The Tadawul Group is a private Qatari holding company based in Doha. It was founded in 2006 by Sheikh Thani bin Abdullah al-Thani and is headquartered in Ezdan Towers, in the West Bay area of Doha. Tadawul's portfolio of investment consists of real estate, banking and finance, consumer goods, media, industry, healthcare, insurance and leisure centers.

Tadawul is also the leading shareholder in the Ezdan Holding Group, and serves as the financing arm of Ezdan, also founded by Thani bin Abdullah al-Thani.

Tadawul has a reported capital of $7.86 billion.

== Founder ==
Sheikh Thani bin Adbullah al-Thani, founder of Tadawul Group, is a member of the powerful House of Thani, Qatar's ruling family. Sheikh al-Thani is one of the largest real estate developers and investors in the Gulf region.

Sheikh al-Thani serves on the boards of, and has founded several major companies and institutions, such as Al-Sharq newspaper, Qatar International Islamic Bank, Qatar Islamic Bank, Masraf Al Rayan, and the Ezdan Holding Group.

In addition to his involvement in Qatar's financial and real estate sectors, Sheikh al-Thani has long been engaged in humanitarian-related work. He is Chairman of Qatar Society for Rehabilitation of Special Needs, founded the Mental Health Friends Association and the RAF (aka the Sheikh Thani Ibn Abdullah for Humanitarian Services Foundation).
