= Vossloh G1700 BB =

Diesel-hydraulic locomotive

G 1700 BB or Am 843^{†}
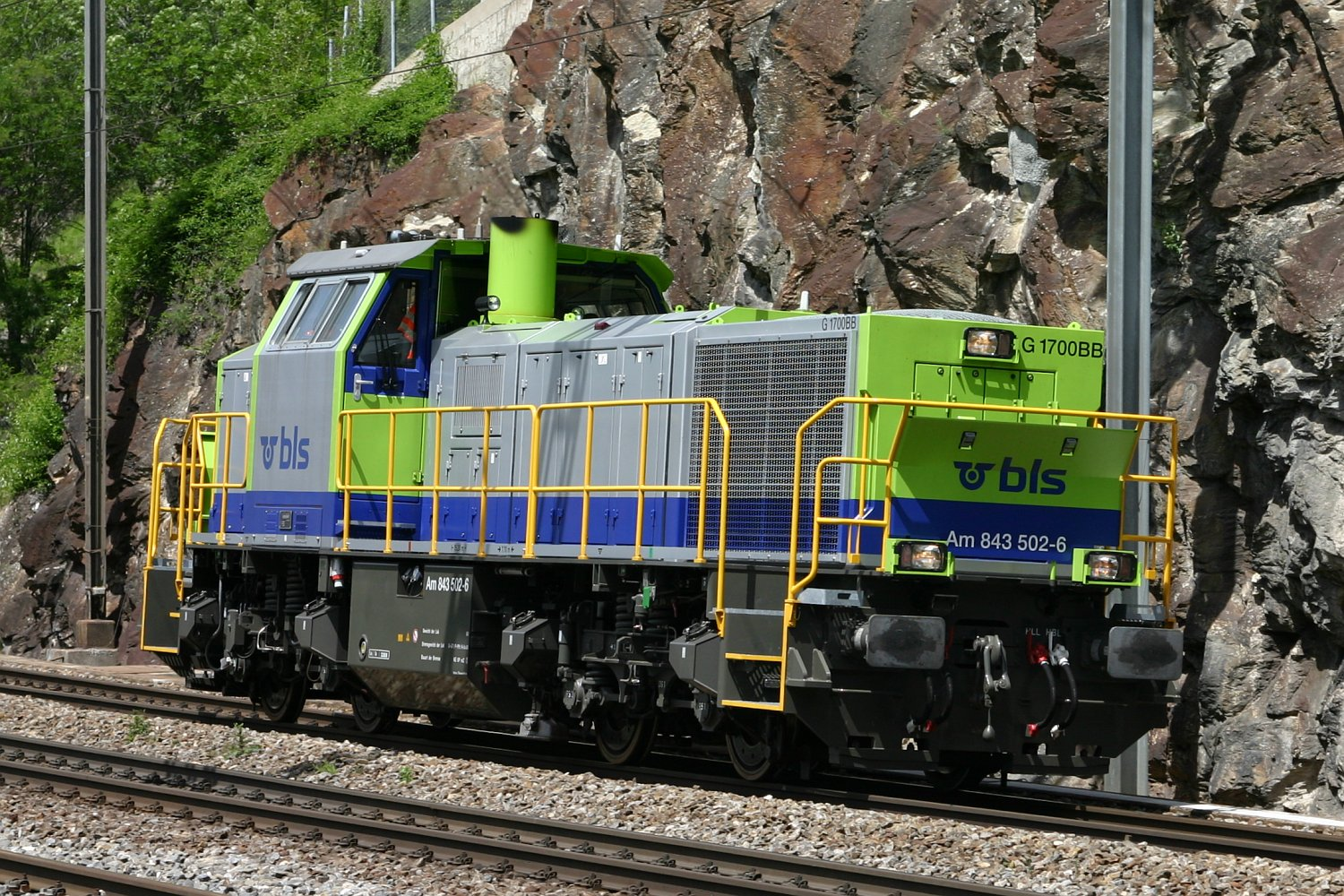
- BLS G1700/Am843
Type and origin
- Power type: Diesel
- Builder: Vossloh Locomotives GmbH.
- Build date: 2002–2011
- Total produced: G 1700 BB: 6 G 1700-2 BB: 31; Am 843: 83
Specifications
- Configuration
  - UIC: B′B′
- Gauge: 1,435 mm (4 ft 8 1/2 in), 1,668 mm (5 ft 5 21/32 in)
- Wheel diameter: 1,000 mm (39.37 in) (new)
- Minimum curve: 60 m (197 ft)
- Wheelbase: 7.400 m (24 ft 3.34 in)* (bogie center distance); 7.700 m (303.15 in) (bogie center distance)
- Length: 14.700 m (578.74 in)*; 15.200 m (49 ft 10.43 in)
- Width: 3.080 m (10 ft 1.26 in)
- Height: 4.220 m (13 ft 10.14 in)
- Loco weight: 80–88 t (79–87 long tons; 88–97 short tons)
- Fuel capacity: 3,500 or 4,400 L (770 or 970 imp gal; 920 or 1,160 US gal)
- Prime mover: MTU 12V4000R20*; CAT 3512B-HD¤ CAT 3512B DI-TA SCAC†‡
- Transmission: Hydraulic / cardan shaft (Voith); L 5R4 zU2*; L 620 reU2¤ L 5R4 zseU2†‡
- MU working: optional
- Loco brake: Disc brake
Performance figures
- Maximum speed: 100 km/h (62 mph)
- Power output: 1,500 kW (2,000 hp)*† or 1,700 kW (2,300 hp)‡¤
- Tractive effort: Starting 291 kN (65,000 lb_{f}) @90 t (89 long tons; 99 short tons), μ=0.33
- initial 6 locomotives † Am 843 (Switzerland) ‡ 1,668 mm (5 ft 5 21/32 in) versions (Spain) ¤ other production

The Vossloh G1700 BB is a four axle B′B′ medium power diesel-hydraulic locomotive manufactured by Vossloh Locomotives GmbH. in Kiel.

The locomotive type is operated by private rail operators in Germany and Austria. In addition, a large order from the Swiss Federal Railway resulted in a variation of the locomotive, designated Am843, now also operated by other rail companies in Switzerland; this variant represents the majority of the locomotives of this type produced.

Locomotives equipped with a Caterpillar engine are sometimes referred to by the sub classification G1700-2.

== Background, design and history ==
The design is based on the MaK G1206, the first locomotive was built with a 1.5 MW MTU 12V4000 engine, a later version first presented at the 2002 InnoTrans was 0.5 m (1 ft 7.7 in) longer, with a raised engine centre section with a 45° edge chamfer to accommodate a larger 1.7 MW CAT 3512B engine. The lower powered 1.5MW MTU engined version did not remain in production; later orders for this power range being fulfilled by the already numerous G1206.

The design resulted in an order from the Swiss Federal Railways for 59 G1700 type locomotives with a CAT 3512B engine rated to 1.5 MW. The Swiss design specified very low emissions, and to comply with this requirement versions of the G1700 built for Switzerland have a diesel particulate filter built in.

== Operators ==
=== 1.5 MW MTU engined G1700 ===
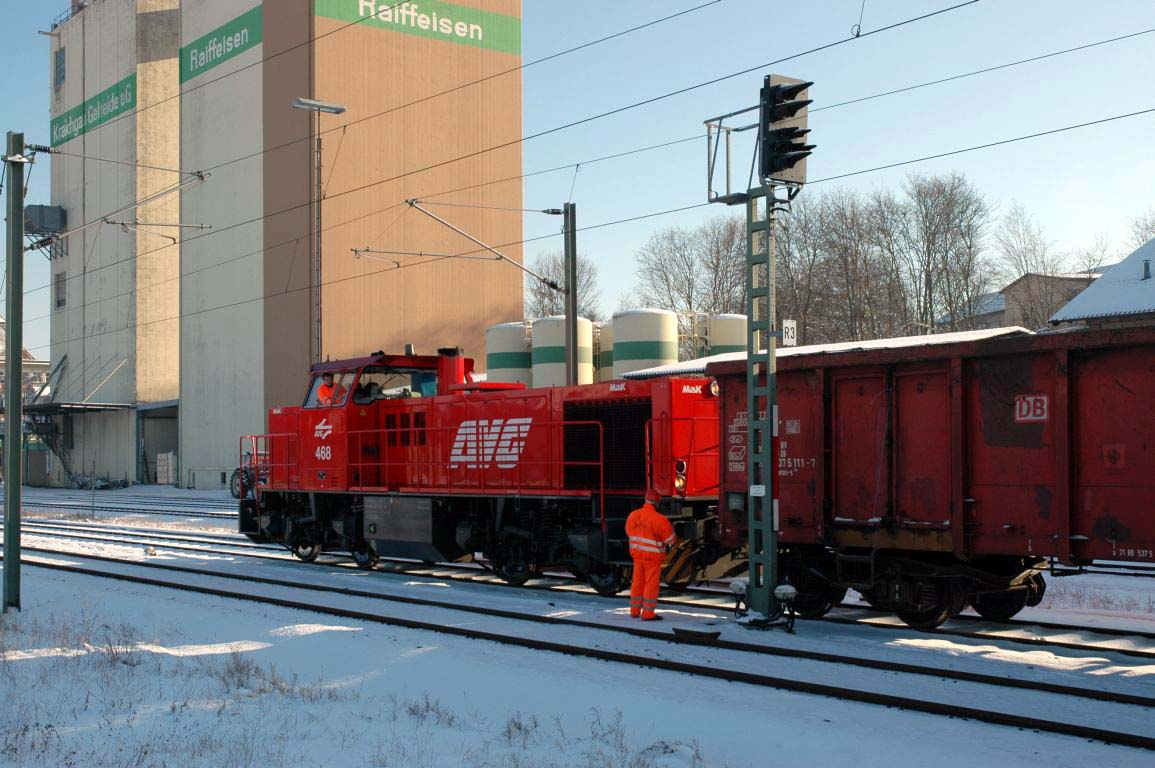
MTU engined G1700 in Eppingen (2005)

Six of the MTU engined versions were built between 2001 and 2003, the transmissions were Voith L5r4zU2 as used on most of the G1206 locomotives. Two were delivered to COMSA (Spain), one to Lucchini S.p.A. (Italy), two to German companies Siegener Kreisbahn GmbH and Neusser Eisenbahn, and one locomotive owned by Vossoh and hired to private companies eventually working long term for Albtal-Verkehrs-Gesellschaft mbH (AVG) as No.468.

=== 1.7 MW CAT engined G1700 ===
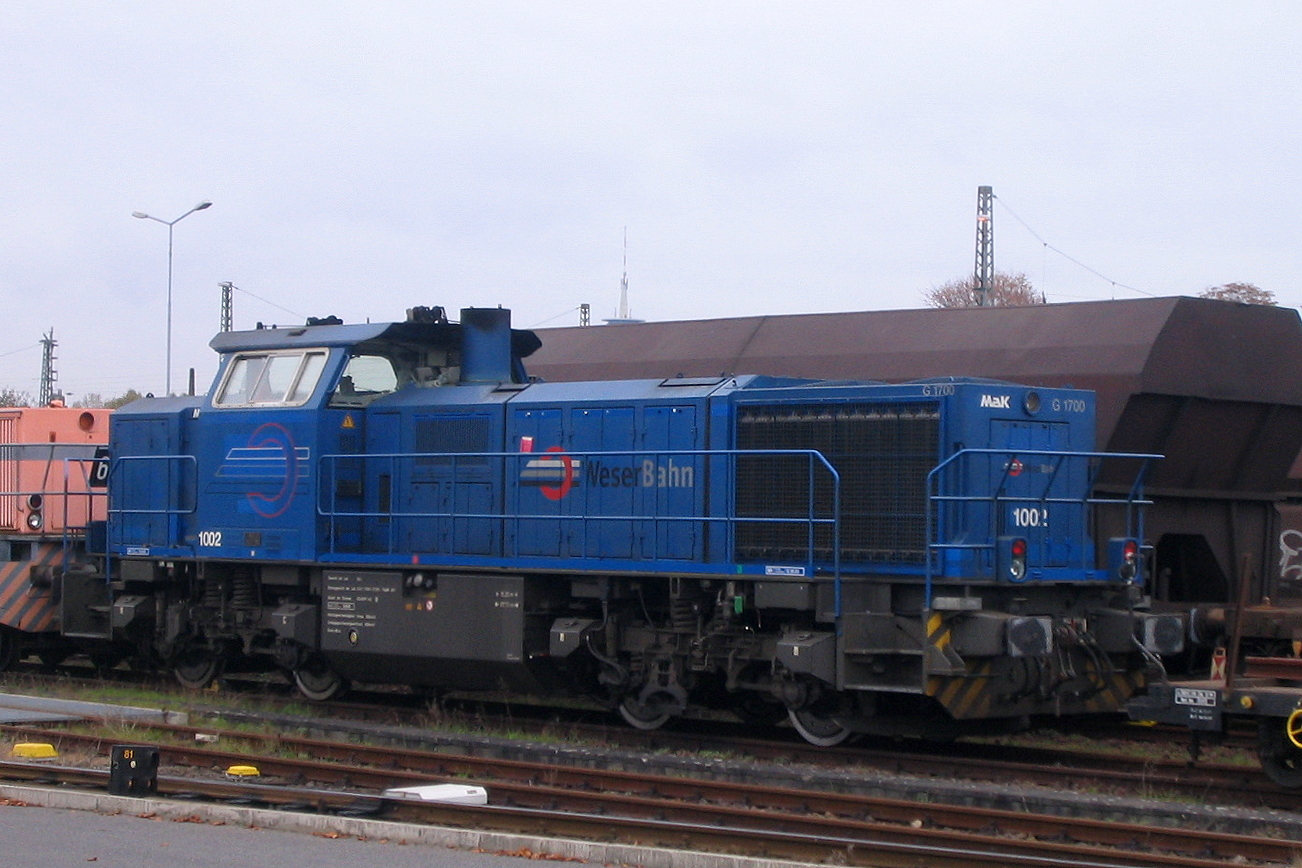
CAT engined G1700 in Moers (2007)

From 2002 onwards CAT 3512B-HD engined G1700s of 1.7 MW rated power with a two speed Voith L620reU2 hydraulic transmission were sold to various private European railway operators. (Note: In some sources this tranche of the production is referred to as Vossloh G1700-2 BB)

Twenty one have been sold to leasing companies and operators in Germany including five to Häfen und Güterverkehr Köln AG, five to Mittelweserbahn, one each to Berliner Hafen- und Lagerhausgesellschaft mbH, Graz-Köflacher Eisenbahn GmbH, and Wiebe Logistik GmbH, as well as five to leasing company Angel Trains Cargo (now Alpha Trains) for rental to various German operators including Niederrheinische Verkehrsbetriebe Aktiengesellschaft (NIAG), Siegener Kreisbahn GmbH. (now called Kreisbahn Siegen-Wittgenstein), Mittelweserbahn, Neusser Eisenbahn, Rurtalbahn GmbH., Albtal-Verkehrs-Gesellschaft, BASF, Häfen und Güterverkehr Köln AG (HGK) and Verkehrsbetriebe Peine-Salzgitter GmbH. Leasing company Mitsui Rail Capital also acquired three units.

Two were sold to Austrian companies Logistik- und Transport GmbH and Graz-Köflacher Bahn und Busbetrieb GmbH, and one to the railways of Kosovo.

=== 1.5 MW CAT engined G1700 ===
==== SBB-CFF-FFS Am843 ====
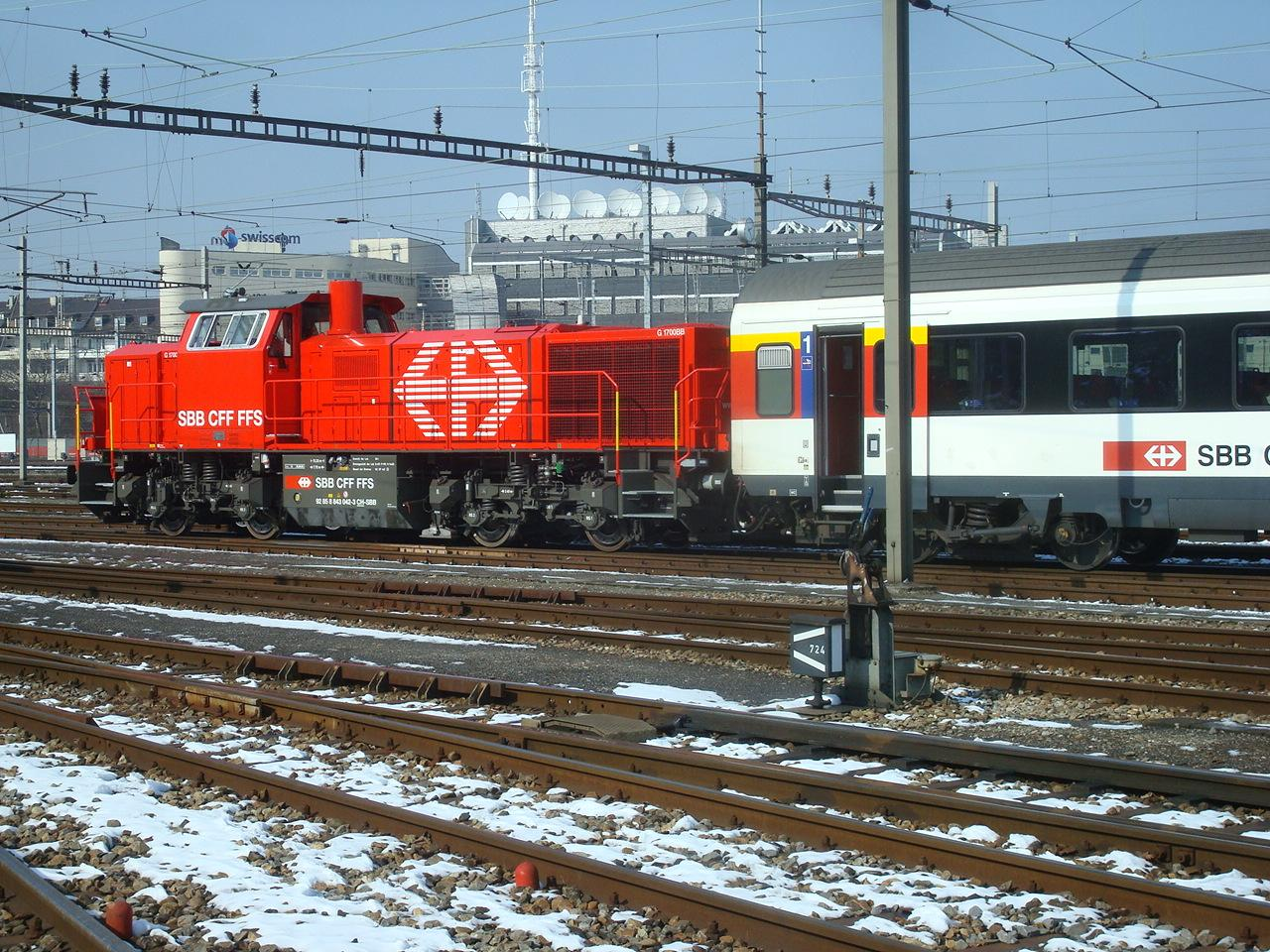
SBB Am843, passenger division, in Basel (2010)

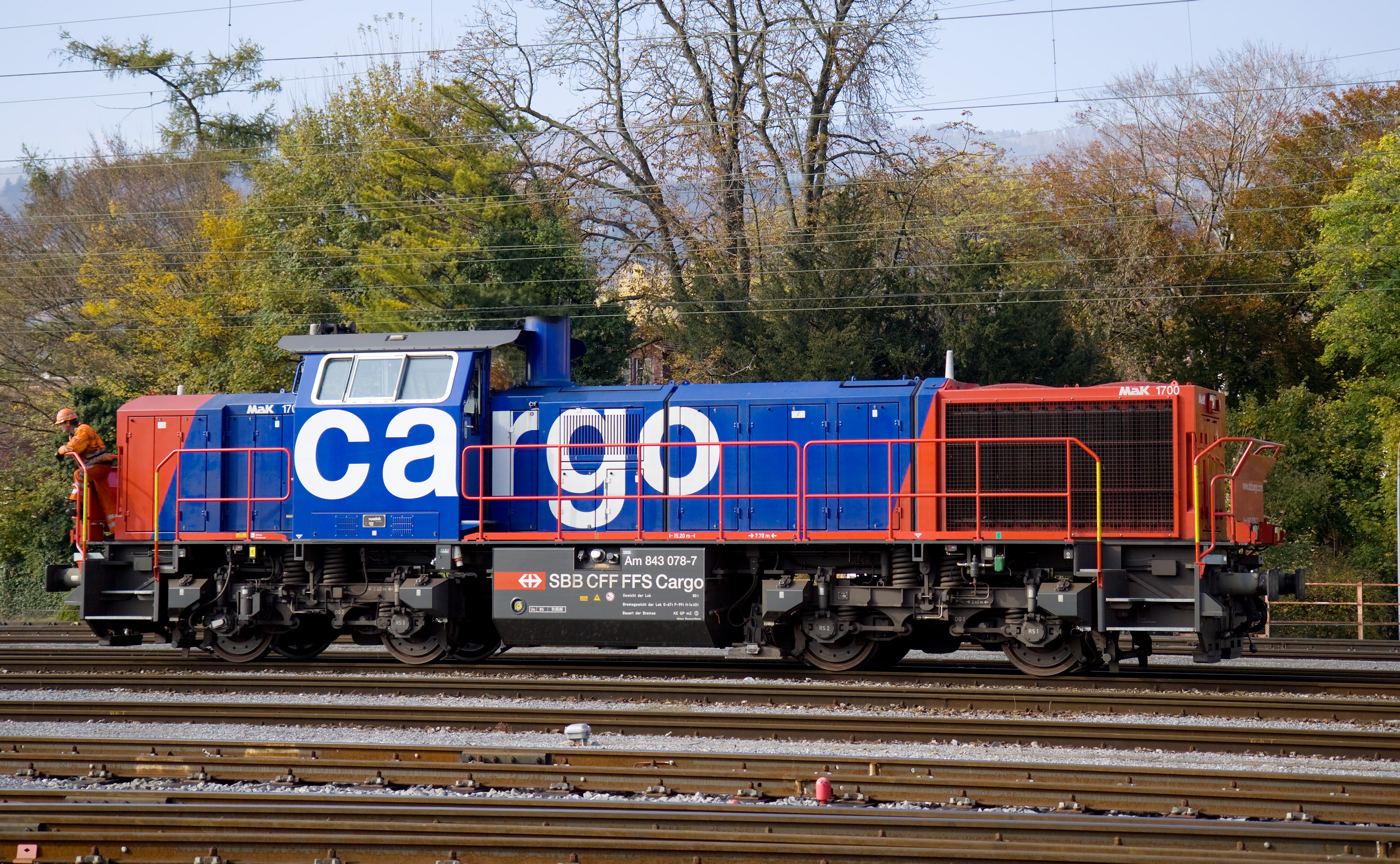
SBB Am843, infrastructure division, in Biel (2008)

An order with the Swiss Federal Railways for 59 diesel locomotives to replace the Bm 6/6 and Em 6/6 types for heavy shunting in freight yards, and trip and construction work resulted in the SBB Am843. The locomotives use a Caterpillar Inc. 3512B DI-TA SCAC engine rated at 1,500 kW (2,000 hp) and Voith L5R4zseU2 two speed hydraulic transmission giving a 40 km/h (25 mph) top speed in the lower gear. The locomotives also have a particulate filter engineered by Hug Engineering of Switzerland which reduces NOx and particulate emissions to low levels.

Initially the order of 59 locomotives was for 40 for SBB Cargo, 14 for infrastructure and 4 for passenger services, as the order was fulfilled the locomotives assigned to passenger train work were reassigned to SBB Cargo, and. with the increase in cross border traffic, fitted with the Indusi safety system for German operations. 14 more locomotives were ordered in 2005.

Locomotives numbered Am843-001 to Am843-028 are assigned to the infrastructure division (SBB Infra), Am843-041 to Am843-043 were delivered in 2009 and assigned to passenger division SBB Personenverkehr, and Am843-050 to Am843-095 were assigned to SBB Cargo.

==== Other Swiss Am843 operators ====
Sersa Group ordered 3 Am843 type locomotives for work on the Lötschberg Base Tunnel construction. They were delivered in 2004 and named Trudy, Barbara and Cinderalla.

In 2006 for operations on the same tunnel BLS AG received 3 Am843 types; these were fitted with ETCS level 2 safety systems.

==== Other versions ====
Four units were built with 1,668 mm Iberian gauge bogies for use by ArcelorMittal's Spanish operations at Avilés, Asturias. They have the same engine and transmission as the Swiss locomotives, but lack the additional particulate filter.

== Miniature models ==
The G1700 and Am843 has been reproduced as a model railway model by Mehano and Piko in HO scale.
