= Nicolas Blancho =

President of the Islamic Central Council of Switzerland

Nicolas Andrev Blancho (also known as Abu Ammar Abdullah or Abdallah; born 12 September 1983, in Biel, Switzerland), is the President of the Islamic Central Council of Switzerland (ICCS). Blancho is originally from Rüeggisberg.

Funded by Qatar, and associated with a member of the House of Al Thani, Blancho is the subject of several controversies, including spreading jihadist propaganda, anti-semitism, attempting to obtain a weapon, and praising the Islamic State of Iraq and the Levant.

== Background ==
According to a report by the Weltwoche, Blancho grew up in Biel as a nonbeliever in a family of liberal thought. After secondary school, he first began an apprenticeship in print production. He converted to Islam at the age of 16. He left the apprenticeship, continued high school and studied law and Islamic studies at the University of Bern in 2007.

In 2004, Blancho founded the company "Alquds Food GmbH", importing food especially from Tunisia. The company was liquidated in 2007. In 2006, he founded with Abdul Hamid Al-Fayek the food import and export company "A & B Tradex GmbH", which was then liquidated in 2013.

Blancho is fluent in German, French and Arabic. He is de facto polygamous, in spite of the ban of polygamy in Swiss law. He married officially a Yemeni woman and then got married with a woman of Kosovo according to Islamic law. According to sources close to ICCS, he has at least a third wife.

Blancho follows a Salafist form of Islam, which excludes a modern interpretation of the scriptures. He described lapidating as "an element, a value of my religion". Since 2003, Nicolas Blancho has been known for his fight to introduce the Sharia law in Switzerland.

Blancho is founder and chairman of the ICCS, together with Qaasim Illi, who was condemned in 2005 for pornography (coprophilia) and anti-semitism.

Over the years, Blancho accumulated many debts, for a total amount of 200,000 Swiss francs, according to a press article published in November 2017. This amount comprises the debts of his bankrupt companies, but also unpaid tax bills, health insurance premiums, contributions to social insurance and car repair bills.

According to politician Henri-Charles Beuchat, it is highly probable that Blancho receives social assistance from the municipality of Bern.

== Controversies ==
The press characterises Blancho, much like the members Islamic Central Council of Switzerland, as a minority of dangerous radicalised Islamists. Other newspaper articles highlight his links with terrorism.

The public prosecutor of Switzerland opened an investigation in November 2016 against Blancho and Qaasim Illi following the publication of a video jihadist propaganda. Another recording suggests he supports the Islamic State group.

In May 2018, the Federal Court of Switzerland confirmed a decision of the police of Bern not to allow Blancho to carry a gun. “There were concrete indications the complainant himself could jeopardize third parties”, said a lower court in Bern, where Blancho appealed the decision.

According to Le Temps, the Swiss Federal Intelligence Service (FIS) is investigating the links between Blancho and Islamists based in Qatar deemed close to al-Qaeda, such as Abdulrahman al-Nuaimi and Ali Abdullah al-Suwaidi.

Blancho is financially supported by Qatar.

He heads the Swiss associations Aziz Aid and Qoranona with Abdulaziz Abdulrahman H.A. Al-Thani, a senior member of the Qatari ruling family, the House of Al Thani.

In a YouTube interview, Blancho also thanks the Sheikh Thani Bin Abdullah Foundation for Humanitarian Services for its financial support.
