= Eisenbahn und Häfen GmbH =

Service company

- Company type: Logistics (rail and ports)
- Founded: 1949
- Headquarters: Duisburg, Germany
- Area served: Ruhr
- Net income: 157million Euro (2006/7); 143million Euro (2007/8)
- Owner: ThyssenKrupp
- Number of employees: 1300 (2006/7); 1200 (2007/8)
- Subsidiaries: EH Güterverkehr GmbH (founded 1998)
- Website: http://www.eisenbahn-und-haefen-gmbh.de/

The Eisenbahn und Häfen GmbH (literal "Railway and Port company Ltd.") (abbr.: EH) is a service company providing rail transportation and associated storage as well as operating the Rhine ports of Schwelgern and Walsum-Süd.

The company is owned by ThyssenKrupp and has its headquarters in Duisburg.

== Background – operations ==
Employing approximately 1,300 employees with around 100 million tons of freight is moved per year (~70 million tonnes by rail and ~25 million tonnes of bulk goods handled by the port), the company is responsible for both railway and port operations, management and maintenance.

=== Railways ===
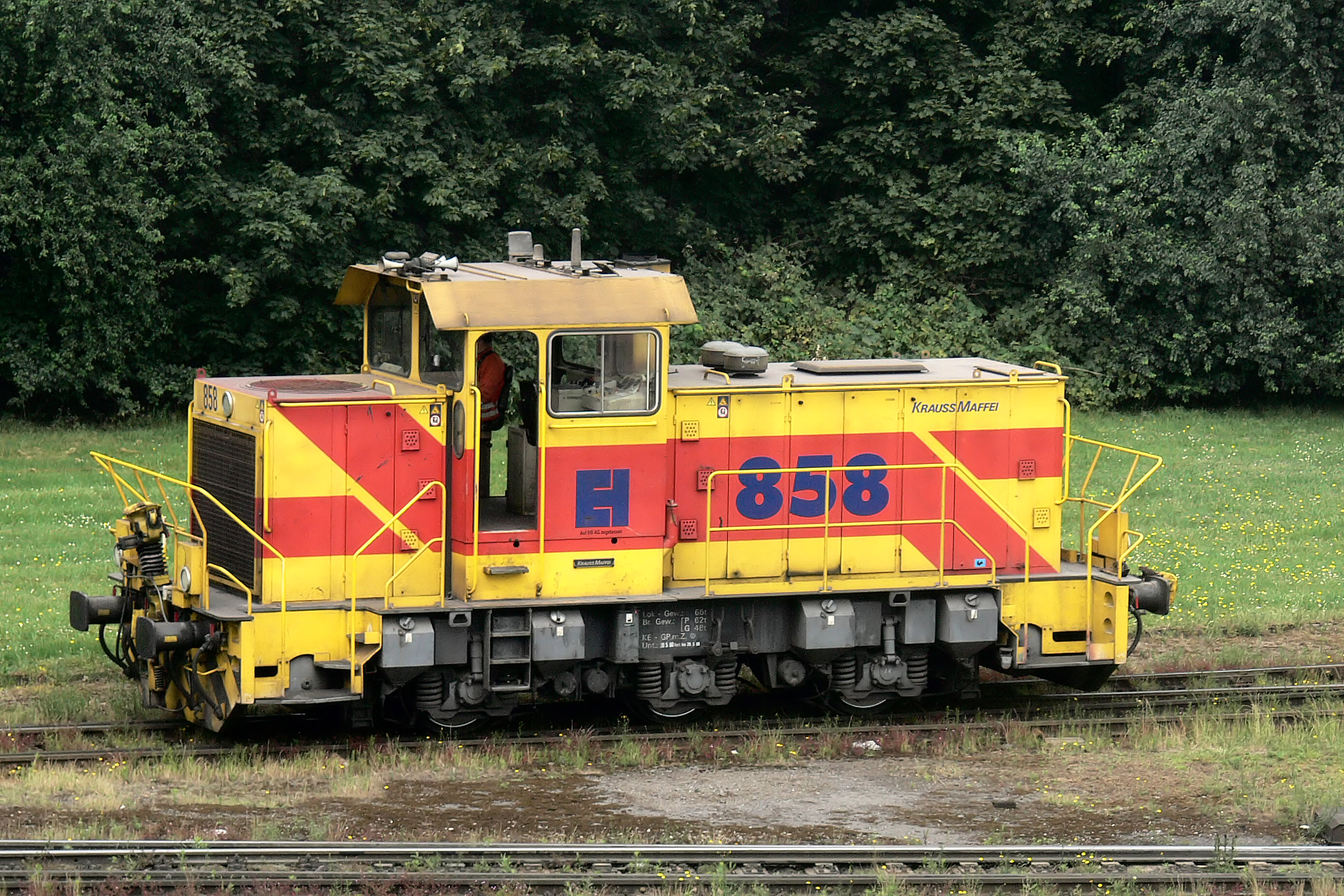
Krauss Maffei MH 05, E&H no. 858

With over 90 locomotives and about 2,000 freight cars Eisenbahn und Häfen GmbH operates in the Ruhr area providing rail transportation to its parent Thyssen Krupp as well as other industrial companies including Hüttenwerke Krupp Mannesmann GmbH, Mannesmannröhren-Werke GmbH, Mittal Steel Ruhrort GmbH and TSTG Schienen Technik GmbH & Co. KG. The primary cargos are steel, coke, iron ore and other steel products such as steel slab and coil.

Within the Ruhr area the network is over 500 km in length, with over a thousand switches. As well as fully operating the railway the company carries out infrastructure maintenance and inspection.

Within individual sites the company uses mainly shunting locomotives such as Krauss-Maffei Class MH 05 (522 kW power). The company also has higher powered MaK G 1205 (1,119 kW) and MaK G 1206 (1,500 kW) locomotives which are certified for use on Deutsche Bahn AG lines. Other services include the operation of private sidings, rolling stock maintenance, time-sensitive operations and, in association with other freight companies, supra-regional transportation. As part of the services offered EH implements various systems including centrally operated signalling and switches, central radio communications and control, and time-sensitive logistics planning.

EH locomotives and some wagons carry a livery of primary yellow and red with blue numbering.

==== EH Güterverkehr GmbH ====
EH Güterverkehr GmbH (literally "EH freight", aka EHG) is a subsidiary company operating as a private rail company on open access lines - in 2006 it transported approximately 7 million tons.

=== Ports ===
Together the ports help serve the inward and outward flows of material related to the steel industry the organisation primarily serves. Both ports stock control systems are computerised.

==== Schwelgern port ====
The main cargo is imported iron ore and coal brought from overseas via Rotterdam and the Rhine. The iron ore and coal is transported in unpowered barges and unloaded by Gantry cranes onto conveyor belts leading the coking plant at Duisburg via grinding and/or sizing equipment in the case of coal, and to blending equipment or storage in the case of iron ore, both ultimately destined for the steel furnaces of Thyssen Krupp. The unloading systems are monitored, assisted, or controlled by computer, with the bulk flows monitored on an IT system.

Additionally there are loading facilities for granulated blast furnace slag. A total ~22million tonnes of material is handled by the port.

==== Walsum port ====
Walsum port handles steel products such as rolled steel. In an area of 260,000m^{2} there are covered loading sheds for rain sensitive materials, as well as outdoor storage areas and access directly to the banks of the Rhine where two 26tonne cranes operate. Both facilities can be accessed by rail links.

Approximately 2.5million tonnes of steel per year are handled by the port.

=== Additional facilities ===
An air controlled warehouse at Beeckerwerth with both road and rail links is operated for the storage of ThyssenKrupp steel products. For the railway workshops equipped for wheel turning as well as general overhaul are held.

== History, industrial heritage trail and other recreations ==
The prehistory of the Eisenbahn und Häfen goes back to 1919, with the first port operations at Alsum and Schelwegern, major growth starting in 1926 with the creation of the Stahlwerke AG. At this time the railway and ports were departments of the group itself. In the post war (WWII) era the steel operations were split up which negatively affected the operations of railway and ports as well. In 1953 Thyssen began to re-conglomerate.

The Eisenbahn und Häfen forms part of "The Industrial Heritage Trail of the Ruhr" – a regional tourist project, as part of the Duisburg section.

== Locomotives ==
Historically the Eisenbahn und Häfen operated dual power diesel / electrically operated locomotives. Two of these units are preserved one at the museum at Oberhausen Hauptbahnhof (Oberhausen Central station) another at Westfälischen Industriemuseum Henrichshütte (Westphalian Industrial Heritage Museum) after being withdrawn. Since 2005 the lines are unelectrified.

The Eisenbahn und Häfen uses shunters and light freight locomotives.

Type	Builder	Power (kW)	UIC class	Build date	Number	Comments
EB	AThT	592	Bo'Bo'	1942	1	Static display
Unimog 1250 L	Daimler Benz	92	A1	1993	1	
EDE 1000/500	Henschel	1000 / 475	Bo'Bo'	1977	6	Withdrawn 1992. One on Static display
DH 600	Henschel	450	C	1962–1965	17	Most withdrawn and scrapped in the 1990s.
DE500	Henschel	500	C	1983–1984	3	Inherited from Thyssen Henrichshütte AG in 1993.
DHG700C-F	Henschel	515	C	1979	2	Inherited from Thyssen Henrichshütte AG. Sold in 2003 to since scrapped.
MG530C	Jenbach/KHD	390	C	1965	3	
ED 40t	Jung		Bo'Bo'	1958–1963	15	Diesel / electric bi-powered locomotive, withdrawn in 1982/3.
ED 80t	Jung	592 / 176	Bo'Bo'	1955–1971	62	Diesel / electric bi-powered locomotive, many withdrawn
EL 07	Krauss-Maffei	592 / 176	Bo'Bo'	1955	3	Withdrawn. One at Westfälisches Industriemuseum since 2003
M 1200 BB	Krauss-Maffei	1119	B'B'	1972–1973	8	Primary diesel engine along with MaK 1205 / MaK 1206. Remotorised in 1992
M 800 BB	Krauss-Maffei	748	B'B'	1966–1967	6	Ex HOAG (Hüttenwerke Oberhausen AG), later remotorised
MH 05	Krauss-Maffei	522	C	1997–2000	26	Main class of shunting engine.
200PS (220PS)	Krupp	162	B	1957	1	From 1991 to Thyssen Stahl AG for work at Duisburg-Bruckhausen works.
G1205BB	MaK	1119	B'B'	1991–1992	12	Certified for main line use
DE501	MaK	500	C	1980–1981	7	
G765C	MaK	560	C	1993	2	
MBB 1200 N	O&K	552	B'B'	1976	2	History as per O&K MC 700 N - inherited in 1994.
MC 700 N	O&K	397	C	1978	2	Originally bought by Mannesman AG, later Hüttenwerke Krupp Mannesmann GmbH' (HKM), both units inherited in 1994
Klv 53	Schöma	65	B	1970	1	
G1206	Vossloh	1500	B'B'	2001–2007	14	Certified for main line use
	Windhoff	70	B	1976	2	Turmtriebwagen

== See also ==
- RAG - A German mining company that also operates its own locomotives.
- Dortmunder Eisenbahn GmbH - Another private railway company, also with ThyssenKrupp as a customer and former owner (previously Hoesch - bought by ThyssenKrupp in a hostile takeover).
- Wanne-Herner Eisenbahn und Hafen GmbH (WHE) - another private rail and port operator in the Ruhr area.
- List of German railway companies

== References and notes ==
=== Primary sources ===
- Rail and port operations, warehouse management and technology Company brochure (English). eisenbahn-und-haefen-gmbh.de
- Eisenbahn- und Hafenlogistik aus einer Hand Company website: "Rail and port logistics from one source" eisenbahn-und-haefen-gmbh.de
