= Voith turbo transmission =

Turbo transmissions are hydrodynamic, multi-stage drive assemblies designed for rail vehicles using internal combustion engines. The first turbo transmission was developed in 1932 by Voith in Heidenheim, Germany. Since then, improvements to turbo transmissions have paralleled similar advances in diesel motors and today this combination plays a leading role worldwide, second only to the use of electrical drives.

Turbo transmissions serve as a hydrodynamic link which converts a motor's mechanical energy into the kinetic energy of a fluid, via a torque-converter and fluid coupling, before producing the final rotary output. Here, the fluid is driven through rotor blade canals at high flow rates and low pressure. This is where turbo transmissions differ from similar hydro-static transmissions, which operate using low flow rates, and high pressure according to the displacement principle.

== Principle ==
Turbo transmissions are hydrodynamic, multi-stage drive assemblies whose performance is based on the Föttinger principle of fluid dynamics. Torque converters, fluid couplings and optional hydrodynamic retarders are the key components in these assemblies, which are ideally suited for powered rail vehicles.

== History ==
The first turbo transmission from 1932 used a relatively simple design. It consisted of a single torque converter for the start-up phase and a fluid coupling for the travel phase which were both mounted on a common shaft. A key feature of this turbo transmission was the filling and emptying of the hydrodynamic circuit, a principle which was first used in Föttinger marine transmissions. This offered the advantages of frictionless start-ups, frictionless gear shifting with constant traction, freewheeling through emptying of the hydrodynamic circuit, and more efficient operation of the fluid coupling.

Contrary to Föttinger however, Voith used low viscosity oil in the hydrodynamic circuit of its turbo transmissions rather than water. In addition, various other improvements were made in the 1930s: The addition of a high-speed gear, a more compact housing, greater compatibility with different motor types, automation gear shifts, as well as cooling via a heat exchanger.

In the 1960s the hydrodynamic retarder was also introduced as a third stage which complemented the torque-converter and fluid coupling. Together, all these engineering improvements had a common goal: to continually increase the transmission's performance rating without compromising its installation complexity or proven reliability.

== Double circuit transmissions for railcars ==
In 1969, the smaller T 211 turbo transmission was developed as an alternative to hydro-mechanical bus transmissions, being designed for diesel railcars in the low power range of 200 to 300 hp (149 to 224 kW). Similar to the first turbo transmission, the T 211 used a linked converter-coupling combination but it also had a high-speed gear for greater efficiency. Additionally, a reversing gear assembly was added and an optional hydrodynamic retarder could be installed if required. The converter had a hydrodynamic circuit diameter of 346 mm (13.6 in), while the fluid coupling had a slightly smaller diameter of 305 mm (12.0 in). And due to its high-speed gear, the main shaft could run significantly higher at 4,170 rpm. As a result, the T 211 r had reserve power, which was reflected by its reinforced mechanical components (gears, bearings and shafts) as well as the transmission controls. At the same time however, the diameters of the converter, coupling and retarder remained unchanged. The overall flow rate within the hydrodynamic circuits was increased to accommodate the higher power rating of 205 to 350 kW (275 to 469 hp). At 350 kW (469 hp), the main shaft ran at just under 5,000 rpm which resulted in rotational speeds for the (empty) converter of 74 m/s when the vehicle reached its maximum speed. To ensure adequate cooling of the converter during high-speed operations, a stronger hydrodynamic fluid pump was installed, which supplied 3.5 L/s of oil through the heat exchanger during the travel phase and 9.0 L/s when in the braking phase, with the retarder rotor also serving as an additional circulating pump. When viewed from the outside this T 211 r transmission differed from its predecessor, the T 211 re.3 with 320 kW (429 hp), only slightly through the addition of a built-in electronic control unit and an enlarged air filter.

Also in 1978 there was a new type of hydraulic gearbox for trains, the T320RZ + KB260 + HA

== Triple circuit transmissions for railcars ==
In 1995, an entirely new transmission design was developed, the VT 611/612, for high-speed trains with tilting technology used by the Deutsche Bahn (German Railways). This new transmission concept used a converter-coupling-coupling design with an integrated hydrodynamic T 312 bre retarder and it had a power rating of 650kW. To shorten the transmission's overall length, a twin shaft construction was used over the high gears, which was similar to the design used in reversing units. The electronic control unit was also built into the transmission. In addition, the transmission's reversing cylinders were operated hydraulically, which eliminated the need of having a compressed air supply on board. Five years later, the T 212 bre transmission was developed with a power rating of 460kW. This transmission was similar in design, but unlike other large transmissions the T 212 bre could be mounted directly on the drive motor. This was a significant advantage, because it resulted in a very compact motor-transmission combination for high-speed trains which could travel at up to 200km/h. The T 212 bre had the same hydrodynamic circuit dimensions as the T 211 r, but it had the further advantage of greater coupling efficiency for trains operating at only 50% of their maximum speed. For high-speed diesel trains this was important, because it permitted dramatically improved fuel consumption.

== Twin converter transmissions for locomotives ==
In 1999, a new twin converter transmission, the L 620 reU2, was developed for high-performance, main-line locomotives. The new L 620 reU2 was equipped with both a start-up converter, having a diameter of 525mm, as well as a travel-phase converter, having a diameter of 434mm. The design of the new L 620 re U2 was based on its successful predecessor, the L 520 rzU2 which had a power rating of 1,400kW. This new transmission however was rated significantly higher at 2,700kW and therefore virtually all of its components had to be enlarged as well as reinforced. In the standard version of the transmission, two gears were mounted on the secondary shaft rather than using the idler wheel found in the older L 520 rzU2. As a result, the drive shaft's output speed could be adjusted to suit the locomotive's power requirements. The drive shaft's main bearing was also enlarged to 550mm. In general, this new high-performance transmission clearly illustrated the enormous capability of hydrodynamic couplings. With a weight-to-power ratio of only 2.06kg/kW, the new L 620 reU2 set a record for locomotive transmissions. By comparison, the similar L 520 rzU2 transmission had a far higher weight-to-power ratio of 2.4kg/kW. In addition, a newly designed hydrodynamic retarder, the KB 385, was available as an optional component. At Vossloh, the locomotive manufacturer based in Kiel, these transmissions were installed in both its G1700 and G2000 main-line locomotives. Finally, the latest development is the LS 640 reU2 transmission which will be used for the first time in the Voith Maxima locomotive having 3,600kW. The LS 640 reU2 is a so-called split turbo transmission which uses two drive shafts from the L 620 reU2 to power both bogies of a six axle diesel locomotive.

== Setting performance standards of turbo transmissions ==
The operating conditions of rail vehicles are the key factors in determining the power requirements of both its motors and transmissions. These operating conditions cover: hauling loads for diesel locomotive, passenger capacities for diesel rail-cars, the topography of the rail line, and the climatic conditions when the vehicle is operated outside of Europe. The expected operating conditions are part of a vehicle's technical requirements and determine the follow points:

1. Maximum speed
2. Acceleration rates during start-up in consideration of the frictional resistance of all motorized wheel-sets in multi car trains
3. Acceleration rates when in transit to avoid traffic jams in metropolitan areas where predominantly electric rail-cars are also in operation
4. Minimum speed which can be maintained over long distances
5. Dynamic braking requirements when travelling at high-speeds and/or over long descents due to its economical operation

Maximum speed, vehicle weight, acceleration rate and the railway slope all influence a motor's performance specifications. Added to that, the requirements of the auxiliary systems also need to be considered, such air-conditioning units, motor cooling systems, brake compressors and in some cases the need for a separate power supply to run the air-conditioning and heating systems of each passenger car. Here, a range of diesel motors can be selected, from large frame V-motors for locomotives to flat six-cylinder sub-floor motors for motorized railcars or even the compact twelve-cylinder motors often used by utility vehicles. For most modern motorized railcars, the preferred solution is a sub-floor-mounted motor-and-transmission combination.

== Advanced development of torque converters ==
In turbo transmissions, the torque converter is clearly the centerpiece of the entire construction and over the past decades its continuous improvements have been primarily responsible for satisfying the steadily increasing demands of diesel powered vehicles. Here, the goal of each improvement has been greater efficiency and better start-up performance, without compromising the start-up converter's dimensions as well as consistent loading of the travel-phase converter when in transit. Of the many different torque-converter designs, the single-stage converter using a centrifugal-flow turbine has proven to be the best. It has a relatively simple construction and due to the radial stability of its turbine the converter is well suited for high rpm operations.

In the 1970s, thanks to new torque-converter developments with improved traction characteristics, (approaching the start-up traction) a two-converter transmission was designed to replace the previously used three-converter transmission. And even today, torque-converters are still being improved, although they have reached an advanced stage. Modern computational fluid dynamics (CFD) can now provide engineers with detailed information on the flow-patterns inside a rotating turbine wheel. Here, the oil-filled circuit in which the turbine turns is portrayed as computerized grid showing the flow characteristics at each grid intersection. For each of these points, the flow volume, speed, and pressure can be calculated. Later during the analysis phase, a three dimensional model of the circuit's flow pattern can be viewed and flow disruptions which reduce the converter's efficiency can be identified, such as: eddies, surface turbulence and mis-directed fluid-flows along the turbine wheel. In addition, aside from visualizing these flow disruptions engineers can also use CFD to calculate the resultant loss in converter efficiency.

In the end, the relationship between changes in a converter circuit's flow-patterns and the efficiency of a torque-converter can then be used to identify potential improvement areas. To a large extent, the predicted values match well with the actual operational measurements, although some differences do occur due to the use of time-saving simplified simulations. Still, CFD allows the optimization of existing converters as well as the development of new virtual-converter types via computer. Afterwards the building of a prototype and the verification of the actual performance results concludes the development phase.

== Literature ==
- Voith Turbo-Transmissions 1930–1985, Volume 1, Locomotive Transmissions, Wolfgang Petzold, Heidenheim, 2002
- Voith Turbo-Transmissions 1930–1985, Volume 2, Railcar Transmissions, Wolfgang Petzold, Heidenheim, 2004
- Voith Drive Technology: 100 Years of the Föttinger Principle, Springer-Verlag, ISBN 3-540-31154-8, Berlin 2005

== See also ==
- List of Voith transmissions
- Voith Maxima
