= SNCF Class BB 61000 =

Class BB 61000
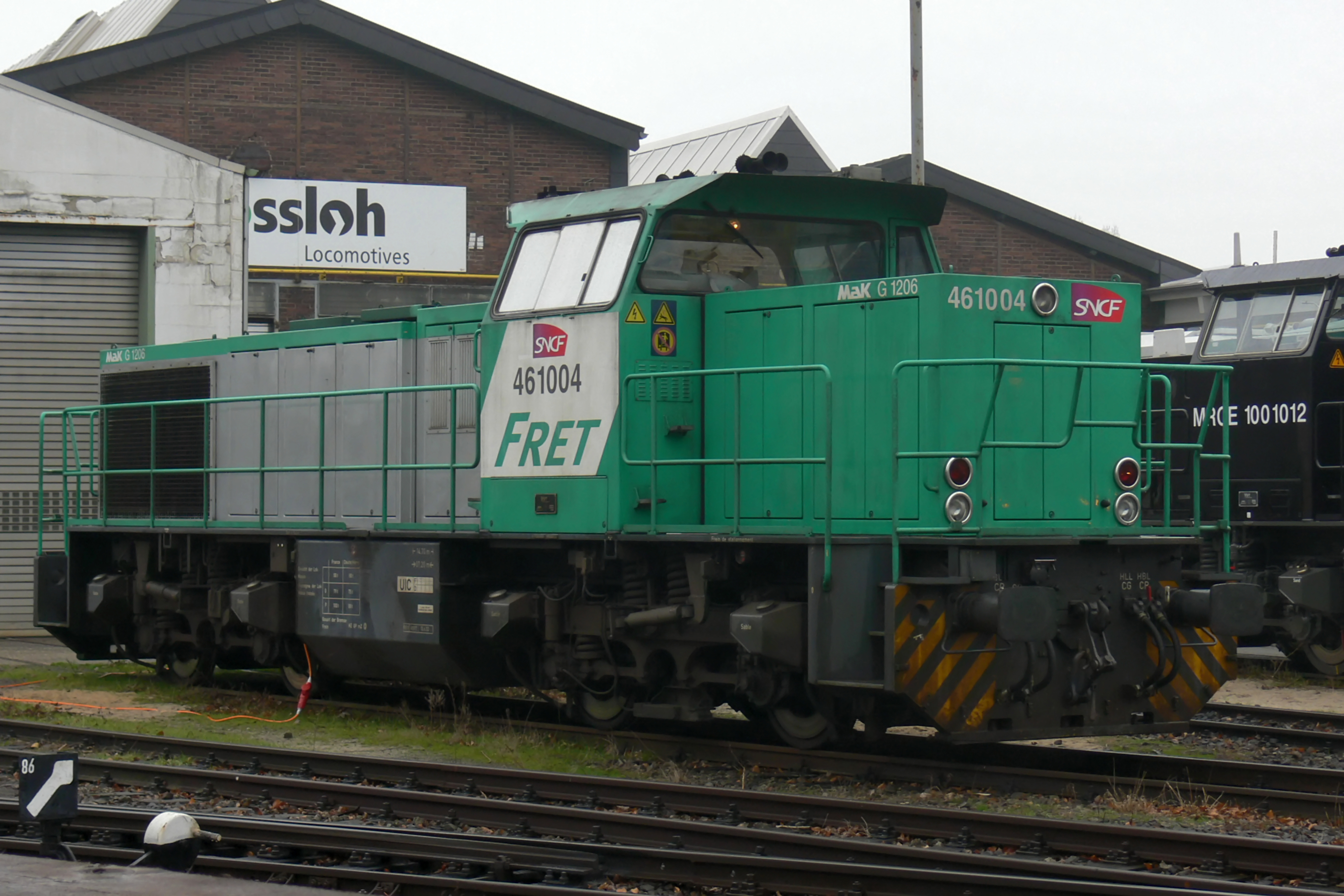
- SNCF 461004 in Moers, Germany, in 2006
Type and origin
- Power type: Diesel-hydraulic
- Builder: Vossloh
- Build date: 2002-2005
Specifications
- Configuration
  - UIC: B′B′
- Gauge: 1,435 mm (4 ft 8 1/2 in)
Career
- Operators: SNCF
- Numbers: 461001-461023

The SNCF Class BB 61000 diesel locomotives were built by Vossloh to their G1206 design between 2002-2005 for the French state railways. Twenty three locomotives were built, numbered 61001–61023. As they are operated by the freight sector, the locomotives carry a '4' prefix (i.e. they are numbered 461001-461023).

These are the second locomotives to be numbered in this range, the first being the Class C 61000 (+ TC 61100).

== Fleet list ==
Locomotive	Entered service	Left service	Livery	Depot	Disposition
BB 61001	14 June 2002	/	Fret	Strasbourg	
BB 61002	14 June 2002	/	Fret	Strasbourg	
BB 61003	14 June 2002	/	Fret	Strasbourg	
BB 61004	14 June 2002	/	Fret	Strasbourg	
BB 61005	14 June 2002	/	Fret	Strasbourg	
BB 61006	14 June 2002	/	Fret	Strasbourg	
BB 61007	10 Jan 2003	/	Fret	Strasbourg	
BB 61008	10 Jan 2003	/	Fret	Strasbourg	
BB 61009	13 June 2003	25 June 2008	Fret	Strasbourg	
BB 61010	13 June 2003	5 Sept 2008	Fret	Strasbourg	ECR
BB 61011	15 Dec 2003	15 Jan 2009	Fret	Strasbourg	
BB 61012	30 Jan 2004	4 Mar 2009	Fret	Strasbourg	
BB 61013	23 Jan 2004	3 Mar 2009	Fret	Strasbourg	
BB 61014	5 Dec 2003	4 Mar 2009	Fret	Strasbourg	VFLI
BB 61015	9 Feb 2004	4 Mar 2009	Fret	Strasbourg	VFLI
BB 61016	13 Feb 2004	4 Mar 2009	Fret	Strasbourg	VFLI
BB 61017	6 Feb 2004	4 Mar 2009	Fret	Strasbourg	VFLI
BB 61018	19 Jan 2004	6 Mar 2009	Fret	Strasbourg	VFLI
BB 61019	25 Feb 2004	4 Mar 2009	Fret	Strasbourg	VFLI
BB 61020	13 Feb 2004	4 Mar 2009	Fret	Strasbourg	VFLI
BB 61021	25 Feb 2004	4 Mar 2009	Fret	Strasbourg	VFLI
BB 61022	19 Jan 2004	4 Mar 2009	Fret	Strasbourg	VFLI
BB 61023	9 Jan 2004	24 Aug 2009	Fret	Strasbourg	VFLI
