= Heinz Hermann Thiele =

German businessman (1941–2021)

- Born: 2 April 1941; Mainz, Hesse, Germany
- Died: 23 February 2021 (aged 79); Munich, Bavaria, Germany
- Education: LMU Munich
- Occupations: Chairman, Knorr-Bremse and Vossloh
- Spouse: Nadia Thiele
- Children: 2

Heinz Hermann Thiele (2 April 1941 – 23 February 2021) was a German businessman and the chairman of Knorr-Bremse AG, a German automobile brakes manufacturer, and chairman of Vossloh, a German transport technology manufacturer. At the time of his death, he had a net worth of $20.2 billion, making him the fourth-richest person in Germany; he was also the largest shareholder in the German carrier Lufthansa AG. He was a recipient of the Order of Merit of the Federal Republic of Germany and the Bavarian Order of Merit.

== Early life ==
Thiele was born on 2 April 1941 in Mainz, in Germany. His family fled from Eastern Germany during the war, and he grew up in Vlotho and Minden, now in North Rhine-Westphalia. His father, who was taken captive during World War II, returned in 1945 and restarted his career as a notary and a lawyer. The family property in Berlin was destroyed during the war, and Thiele grew up with limited financial means.

He graduated from high school in 1961 and earned a master's degree in law from LMU Munich.

== Career ==
Thiele began to work for Knorr-Bremse in 1969 as a patent lawyer. He joined the company's executive board in 1985. That year, when the grandson of founder Georg Knorr wanted to sell his shares and the company was facing bankruptcy, Thiele was commissioned to find a buyer. During the process, Deutsche Bank told him that if he bought it himself, the bank would act as guarantor. He purchased a controlling stake and later became sole owner. He had famously told an interview with the Frankfurter Allgemeine Zeitung, that at the time of buying-out the company, he had not even repaid the mortgage on his house. He spoke of how he had gone against the advice of a management consulting firm that had recommended that the company leave industrial brakes and pursue industrial pneumatics instead. He went on to transform the company to be a market leader in railway and heavy-truck brakes.

After becoming the company's chief executive in 1987, Thiele initiated structural changes and narrowed the group's focus to braking technology. He joined the company's supervisory board in 2007. In 2018, the company went public on the Frankfurt Stock Exchange in what was considered the country's second-largest initial public offering of 2018. His family and he, as shareholders, made $3.6 billion (3 billion euros) from the public offering. Having retired from all operational positions in the company in 2016, he returned to the supervisory board as a deputy chairman in 2020 after a management crisis at the company.

Later in his career, Thiele had turned an activist investor with Lufthansa, and noted his dissatisfaction with the government's rescue plan for the airline. Thiele was the largest shareholder as of June 2020. When Lufthansa agreed to a state bailout during the COVID-19 recession in 2020, Thiele raised his stake in the company from 10 to 15.5 percent. Specifically, he opposed the government's intent to take a 20% stake in the airline in exchange for the 9 billion euro bailout to ensure its solvency during the pandemic.

Thiele had a mixed appeal, with the German trade unions calling him a "caveman capitalist" whose factory workers worked 42 hours a week while those in the rest of the sector worked 35. The business community considered him a rail industry tycoon and a patriarch of the industry. Some of his other holdings included a 59% stake in Knorr-Bremse, half of railroad-equipment manufacturer Vossloh AG, in addition to his stake in the Lufthansa. With a net-worth of $20.2 billion, he was the fourth-richest person in Germany, per the Bloomberg Billionaires Index.

His philanthropic investments included the Knorr-Bremse Global Care. He sponsored the Bavarian State Opera, the Lenbachhaus art museum and the Deutsches Museum science and technology museum in Munich, as well as the Technical University of Munich. He was a recipient of the Order of Merit of the Federal Republic of Germany, and the Bavarian Order of Merit.

== Personal life ==
Thiele and his wife, Nadia, had two children, and lived in Munich. His daughter Julia, is a member of the supervisory board at Knorr-Bremse, while his son Henrik is a founder of an electric charging technology startup.

Thiele died on 23 February 2021 in Munich at age 79.
