= Foundation Sheikh Thani Ibn Abdullah for Humanitarian Services =

Qatari humanitarian organization

The Foundation Sheikh Thani Ibn Abdullah for Humanitarian Services (مؤسسة الشيخ ثاني بن عبد الله للخدمات الإنسانية), abbreviated as RAF (راف) is a Qatari foundation established by the al-Thani family.

The foundation provides humanitarian aid and contributes to social development of all sectors of the Qatari society without discrimination. RAF is also engaged in international projects in partnership with foundations that share the same goal. The Sheikh Thani Bin Abdullah for Humanitarian Services Foundation (RAF) was founded in 1969 with the mission of 'connecting the world with mercy'. It offers worldwide aid and humanitarian help to everyone in need. It has projects in 97 countries around the world. Partners of the organization include the IHH Humanitarian Relief Foundation, iheed institute, the Carter Center, the Complex Program Group, WFP, WHO, UNHCR, and various other UN agencies and organizations. RAF is highly involved in education, health care, and medical assistance, and contributes to global initiatives to address people's fundamental needs worldwide.

== Management ==
The foundation was founded by Thani bin Abdullah. Ayed bin Dabsan Al Qahtani is the current CEO.

== Mission ==
According to its website, RAF aspires to reach levels of excellence as a humanitarian foundation, which participates in "establishing communities of mercy" in Qatar and throughout the world.

The foundation aims to support those who are most in need, and pursues five main goals:

- Consolidating humanitarian compassion;
- Achieving social solidarity;
- Providing relief to injured parties;
- Protecting human values;
- Developing and supporting charitable projects.

== Activities ==
RAF’s initiatives are primarily focused on “Training and Development” and “Humanitarian Aid.” The RAF Center for Training and Civil Society Studies is a good example of the foundation’s synergic approach to both areas of action, in that it aims to provide specialized training in the field of humanitarian and charitable work. In fact, the foundation attempts to identify the needs of organizations, charities and workers in the field of humanitarian work, and to develop ad hoc training programs in order to enhance their performances.

RAF also designs and implements specialized projects to develop the educational and professional capacities of targeted social groups and to support their entry into the labor market.

The foundation organizes conferences, seminars and workshops on the subjects of humanitarian work and community service to evaluate and measure the impact of the gained experience, and establishes partnerships with institutions and experts in the field.

Moreover, RAF carries out extensive research in the field of humanitarian aid. The foundation closely monitors the development of the Qatari society, prepares studies on contemporary phenomena and social problems, and contributes to the dissemination of humanitarian culture and volunteerism among civil society through integrated social network information and publications.

== Cooperation with UNHCR ==
RAF has made its first contribution to UNHCR of USD 220,000 in 2016 to support vulnerable urban refugee families in Jordan. In 2017, RAF contributed some USD 2,535,000 to support vulnerable communities in Somalia, internally displaced Iraqis, Rohingya refugees in Bangladesh and Somali refugees in Ethiopia.

Given the new rules implemented by RACA in having only 4 Qatari organizations work with international organizations, in 2018, RAF channeled funds to UNHCR through QC of some USD 2.1 million for the provision of multipurpose cash assistance for internally displaced Iraqis.

RAF has helped around 320,000 refugees and internally displaced persons in the region and globally with a total financial support of some US$ 4 million.

== Recent initiatives ==
RAF is especially active in the fields of education, health care and medical assistance, and supports international efforts to meet the basic needs of people throughout the world.

The foundation is preparing to implement a food bank in Qatar that is expected to benefit 1200 families on a monthly basis.

RAF has funded 157 charitable projects in Sudan, and has initiated the implementation of service complexes for several villages in Darfur within the framework of its “Darfur development program”.

With RAF financial support, the “RAF International University” was established in Kenya to provide modern university education and to serve the Muslim minorities in East Africa by reinforcing their presence in all productive and intellectual sectors. RAF also opened the largest mosque in the city of Mannar, in northern Sri Lanka. Another project in Sri Lanka, executed in July 2012, witnessed the establishment of a residential village with 200 houses at an estimated cost of QR 2.6 million.

Moreover, the foundation is planning to build a school in Kyrgyzstan and an educational complex in Mauritania. RAF also carried out a work field study in Tunisia and submitted a plan to establish a package of projects that serve the country’s economic and social development.

In August 2012, RAF embarked on a project which would involve the expenditure of QR 27 million on medical infrastructure and housing in Zaatari refugee camp to assist refugees of the Syrian Civil War. The foundation also raised $3.3 million in February 2015 from a radio program they organized with the aim funding housing developments for Syrian child refugees.

The first phase of the Save a Life Initiative (SALI) was initiated in November 2015. Aiming to provide free health services to people in developing countries, this phase witnessed the installation of numerous portable clinics in Sudan.

RAF has also been active in founding projects of an Islamic nature. RAF has stated its intention to print and distribute a million copies of the Quran to distribute throughout Asia, Europe and Africa. RAF has already printed and distributed 505 thousand copies of the Quran to 9 countries in Africa as well as other Asian and European countries. RAF also recently financed the construction of 30 mosques in Ghana and an Islamic school in Sudan.

== Achievements ==
According to the data available on the foundation's website, RAF has established 140 training programs involving 1836 trainees and organized two conferences and international meetings.

RAF acknowledges 150 institutions among its beneficiaries, including its partners, senior leadership institutions, charitable and humanitarian organizations and volunteers.
