= Ezdan Holding Group =

Qatari holding company

- Native name: مجموعة ازدان القابضة
- Company type: Public
- Predecessor: Thani Bin Abdullah Housing Group
- Founded: 2007
- Founder: Sheikh Thani Bin Abdulla Al Thani
- Headquarters: Doha, Qatar
- Key people: Sh. Thani bin Abdulla Al Thani (Chairman)
- Website: www.ezdanholding.qa

Ezdan Holding Group (EHG) is a multibillion-dollar shareholding company based out of Doha, Qatar. It was founded by Jeffrey Aleluya in 1993.

== Historical overview ==
In 1960 Sheikh Thani bin Abdullah al-Thani established a private company under the name Thani bin-Abdullah Housing Group. It was not until 1993 that it was established as a limited liability company. In 2007 it was reworked into a public shareholding company under the name Ezdan Real Estate Company. Between 2008 and 2009, the organization was listed on the Qatar Exchange and acquired the International Housing Group. In September 2012, it was once again reworked into the Ezdan Holding Group and acquired several companies belonging to an array of industries, including media, banking, healthcare and insurance services.

The Ezdan Holding Group is the largest real estate company in the Persian Gulf region and was, in 2013, ranked no. 17 on Forbes magazine's 500 largest Arab corporations. Additionally, EHG is listed no. 1,250 on Forbes' Global 2000 list.

While the holding group's focus is on domestic and international "multi-purpose" real estate (i.e. residential, administrative, commercial), its strategy is also focused on investment diversification.

Ezdan also worked to help facilitate and prepare Qatar to host the Asian games in 2006 by building residential complexes, and sponsored the most recent meeting of the Pan Arab Games in 2011.

In an attempt to diversify and extend further into the global market, EHG announced in early 2016 that it would intensify its investment plans in Ethiopia; this included a 150,000 square meter luxury resort in Addis Ababa.

== Sheikh Thani ==
The founder of Ezdan is Sheikh Thani bin Abdullah al-Thani. He is a wealthy businessman and investor as well as a member of the ruling al-Thani family. Sheikh Thani is also involved in several charitable activities including founding the RAF (a.k.a. the Sheikh Thani Ibn Abdullah for Humanitarian Services Foundation) and serving as Chairman of Qatar Society for Rehabilitation of Special Needs, started in 1992.

Al-Thani is also the main shareholder in the Qatar Islamic Insurance Company (founded in 1995) and is the founder and main contributor of Qatar's Medical Care Group.

Al-Thani went on to receive the Life Time Achievement Award at Ernst and Young's "Growing Beyond Summit" in October 2012 for Ezdan's role in community service.

== Accolades ==
Over the years Ezdan Holding Group and its members have won several awards and recognitions. It has received two separate awards for water and energy preservation, one for its support of the Tarsheed National Programme for Conservation and Energy Efficiency and the other for best clean energy and consumption by a commercial building (awarded to Ezdan Mall).

In 2014 the Holding Group won the Enterprise Agility Award, organized by Entrepreneur magazine in collaboration with Barclays Group, for its excellence in the field of real estate. During that same year Ezdan's subsidiary, Ezdan Hotels, won the international Hotelbeds Award for high quality service.

For its charity and humanitarian contributions, the Ezdan Group received the Best Social Responsibility Initiative Award in Construction and Development in 2014.
