= MaK G 1205 =

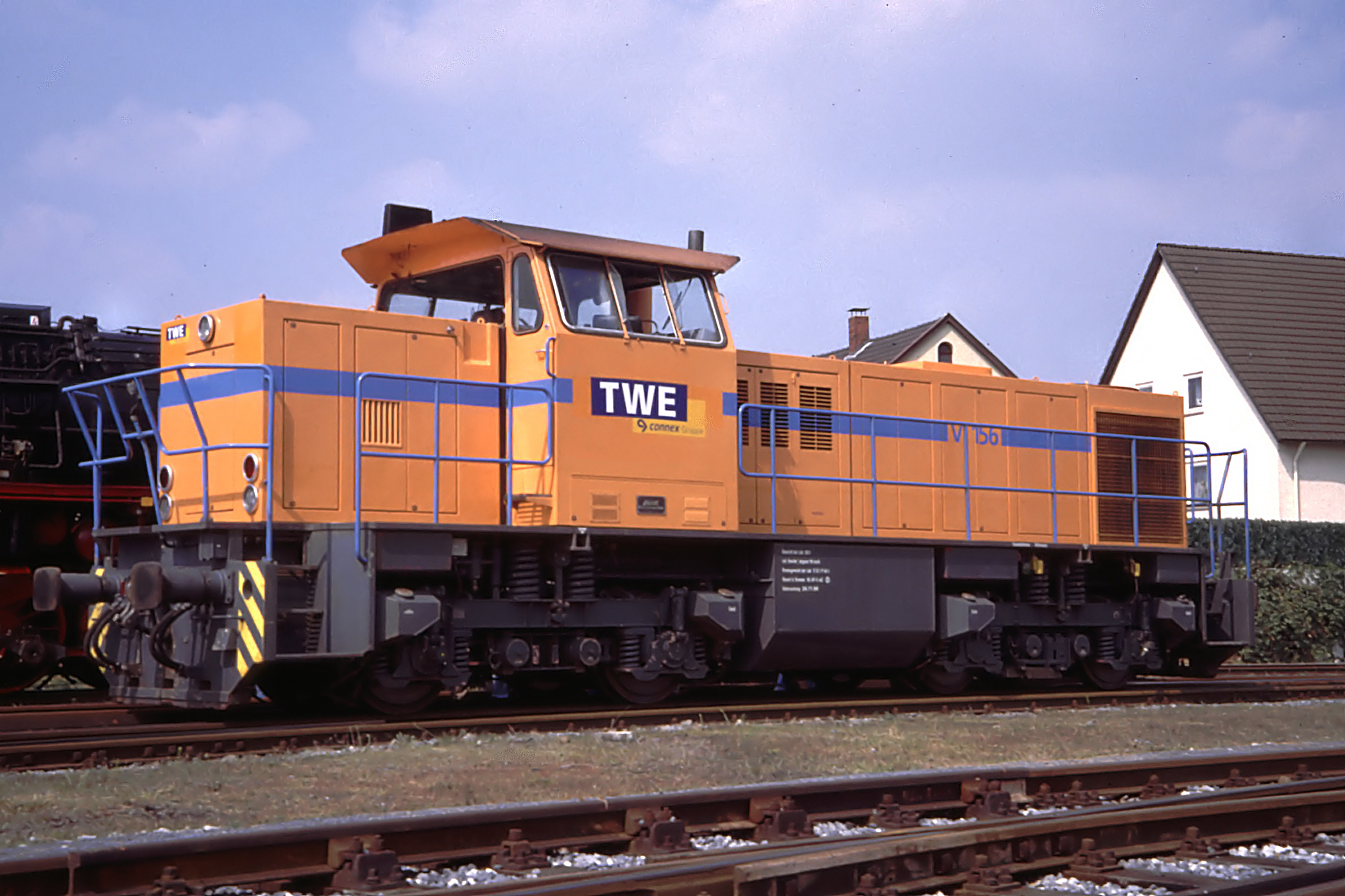
- Teutoburger Wald-Eisenbahn (TWE) MaK G 1205
Type and origin
- Power type: Diesel
- Builder: MaK
- Build date: 1991–1997
- Total produced: 31
Specifications
- Configuration
  - UIC: B'B'
- Gauge: 1,435 mm (4 ft 8 1/2 in)
- Wheel diameter: 1,000 mm (39.37 in) (new)
- Minimum curve: 60 m (197 ft)
- Wheelbase: bogie centre distance 6.100 m (20 ft 0.2 in) axle distance 2.400 m (94.49 in)
- Length: 12.800 m (41 ft 11.9 in)
- Width: 3.080 m (10 ft 1.26 in)*; 3.100 m (10 ft 2.05 in)
- Height: 4.415 m (14 ft 5.82 in)*; 4.220 m (13 ft 10.14 in)
- Fuel capacity: 3,000 L (660 imp gal; 790 US gal)*; 2,500 L (550 imp gal; 660 US gal)
- Prime mover: CAT 3512 DI-TA : 1,120 kW (1,500 hp)*; MTU 12V 396 TC14 : 1,180 kW (1,580 hp)
- Transmission: Voith L5r4U2
Performance figures
- Maximum speed: 60 km/h (37 mph)*; 80 km/h (50 mph); 100km/h**

The MaK G 1205 is a class of four axle B'B' diesel-hydraulic locomotives built by the Maschinenbau Kiel factory.

== Description and operations ==
The locomotives are of a similar design to the MaK G 1204 BB locomotives, with hydraulic transmission, B'B' wheel arrangement, and off-centre cab.

The first twelve locomotives were built for the Eisenbahn und Hafen in Duisburg, Germany, and were powered by a V 12 Caterpillar engine, the remainder were powered by a similarly powered V 12 MTU engine also used on the MaK G 1204 BB. The Voith hydraulic converter is the same as that used on the MaK G 1204 BB and MaK G 1202 BB.

Of the 19 MTU engined versions 6 were built for NISCO (National Iranian Steel Company), 10 have worked for a variety of German private railway companies, 1 for Graz-Köflacher Eisenbahn- und Bergbaugesellschaft mbH in Austria, and 2 for Banverket in Sweden.

== See also ==
- The Belgian Railways Class 77, of which 170 were built, is a development of the design.
