= Vossloh =

German transport technology manufacturer

Vossloh AG
- Type: Aktiengesellschaft
- Traded as: FWB: VOS; SDAX
- Industry: Rail infrastructure
- Founded: 1888; 138 years ago
- Founder: Eduard Vossloh
- Headquarters: Werdohl, Germany
- Key people: Oliver Schuster (CEO); Rüdiger Grube (Chairman of the supervisory board)
- Products: Broad range of rail fastening systems, concrete sleepers, switch systems, as well as services related to the maintenance of rails and turnouts
- Revenue: 918,3 Mio.€ (December 2017)
- Number of employees: 3,685 (31.03.2017)
- Website: vossloh.com

Vossloh AG is a rail technology company based in Werdohl in the state of North Rhine-Westphalia, Germany. The SDAX-listed group achieved sales of around €930 million in 2016 and, as of 2017, had more than 4,000 employees.

Vossloh can trace its origins back to the late 19th century and Edward Vossloh, a blacksmith who secured component manufacturing work for the Royal Prussian Railway in the 1880s. In the following decades, the company expanded into the production of general hardware, including decorative items and lampholders for electric lighting. The company has long been based at Werdohl, though this has not always been straightforward; the company’s facilities there were bombed during the latter half of the Second World War. Several subsidiary companies were lost following the conclusion of the conflict. However, Vossloh survived, launching production of fluorescent tube holders at a plant in Lüdenscheid in 1946. In 1967, it obtained a license to make a new tension clamp rail fastening. During the late 1980s, considerable reorganisation was undertaken, management outside of the Vossloh family was brought in, rival company Schwabe GmbH was acquired and, on 1 December 1989, Vossloh-Werke GmbH became a public stock company or Aktiengesellschaft (AG).

By the twenty-first century, Vossloh had developed into a global market leader both for rail fasteners and switch systems; a series of acquisitions in the 1990s and 2000s had greatly bolstered its presence in the rail sector. In North America, Vossloh became the leading manufacturer of concrete railway ties. It has offered a globally unique grinding technology, so-called high-speed grinding, for track maintenance. Vossloh previously owned three business units for Electrical Systems, Locomotives, and Rail Vehicles; these were sold in 2015, 2020 and 2016 respectively. The brand name "Vossloh" is still used for several products that are not, or are no longer, related to Vossloh AG. For example, Vossloh locomotives have been produced by the China Railway Rolling Stock Corporation (CRRC) since 2020.

Its customers are generally public and private railway companies and network operators, as well as regional and municipal transport companies. Since its restructuring in the mid-2010s, Vossloh has focused on target markets: China, the US, Russia and Western Europe. Important Vossloh production sites are in Germany, France, Luxembourg, Poland and Scandinavia. In addition, the group has subsidiaries in Asia, North and South America, Australia and Russia.

== History ==
=== Origins and early years ===
The company origins can be traced back to the German blacksmith Eduard Vossloh. After having returned from the Franco-Prussian War, Vossloh undertook various forms of work and struggled to turn a profit until he secured a major contract during 1883 for the manufacture of spring washers, used for rail fasteners, from the Royal Prussian Railway; allegedly, the Prussian authorities had looked positively upon his military service. Lacking the resources to fulfil the order, Vossloh hired several workers and obtained help from another German company, Kugel & Berg, which delivered the needed wire to construct the metal lock rings. Soon after the order's fulfilment, additional orders followed, and Vossloh had no shortage of work. On 11 July 1888, the Eduard Vossloh Company was registered; that same year, the business moved to new premises outside of Werdohl's inner core that facilitated an expanded workshop and product range.

By the mid-1890s, this workshop had been equipped with a variety of machines and effectively become a small factory. In 1899, Edward Vossloh died and his three oldest sons took on the management of the company. One of these sons, Karl Vossloh, became an engineer and expanded the company’s product range by developing various new metal components for the railways. The business grew steadily around this time; by the outbreak of the First World War in 1914, it employed roughly 240 people and provided a steady living for the Vossloh family. During 1917, a large German steel maker, Rheinische Stahlwerke Duisburg, held talks with the Vossloh family on acquiring the firm; however, terms could not be agreed and no such deal took place. In the aftermath of the conflict, the demand for forged products collapsed and Vossloh opted to focus on smaller metal components instead of manufacturing larger ones, establishing a modest plant to produce sheet metal along with a separate new facility to supply the former with raw materials.

During the early 1920s, the business was reorganised into three limited liability companies, each led by one of the three oldest Vossloh brothers; one headed the production plants in Werdohl, another led the Lüdenscheid factory, and the last brother was responsible for marketing and sales. In 1924, Vossloh acquired a wood processing plant in Dillenburg; by this time, Vossloh maintained more than 60 company-owned apartments that were rented at low prices to Vossloh employees. During 1927, Karl Vossloh developed the high tension ring, which went on to become the standard used on numerous railways across Europe, including Germany. By the late 1920s, Vossloh had developed a network of sales offices across the region, including offices in Königsberg, Breslau, Munich, Frankfurt/Main, Belgium, and the Netherlands. Throughout the early 20th century, the company continued to grow, producing general hardware, including decorative items and lampholders for electric lights; its diverse product range helped it survive the Great Recession.

Demand for Vossloh's products remained strong throughout the 1930s and into the Second World War; in the war year, women took the place of many of the male craftsmen that were sent off to fight. During early 1945, amid the closing months of the conflict, the firm's facilities in Werdohl were destroyed by a bomb. Subsidiaries marketing lampholders, which were located in Kaliningrad, Wrocław and East Germany, ceased to be part of the company due to the post-war changes to Germany's national borders made at the end of the conflict. In contrast, Werdohl has remained an important location to the company; even in the 21st century, the headquarters of Vossloh AG and Vossloh Fastening Systems GmbH (Core Components division) are located here.

During 1946, production of holders for fluorescent tubes was allowed to take place at a plant in Lüdenscheid. By 1950, recovery was well underway, with in excess of 700 employees at Vossloh's three production facilities. By 1962, an additional plant for lighting products had opened in Selm and the Vossloh works employed 1,300 people, with 500 more employed in subsidiaries. A decisive turning point in the company's fortunes occurred in 1967 when Vossloh obtained a license to produce a new tension clamp rail fastening developed by Prof. Hermann Meier, director of the Deutsche Bundesbahn.

As a result of a recession in Germany in the 1980s, two plants were closed and many employees were laid-off, reducing Vossloh's headcount by almost half. Management was brought in from outside the Vossloh family, and the rival company Schwabe GmbH was acquired. Schwabe's lighting ballast products complemented Vossloh's lighting fittings product range and, on 1 December 1989, Vossloh-Werke GmbH became a public stock company or Aktiengesellschaft (AG). At that time, there were three company divisions : Vossloh-Werke GmbH (Werdohl) (railway components, e.g., tension clamps), Vossloh-Schwabe GmbH (Urbach) (electrical lighting products and components), and Hansa Metallwarengesellschaft mbH Thiessen & Hager (decorative products, sunscreen products).

=== 1990s and beyond ===
The current listed company was founded in 1990. On 13 June 1990, the shares of Vossloh AG were listed on the Düsseldorf Stock Exchange for the first time. During the 1990s, the reunification of Germany, and the opening of new markets in eastern Europe, resulted in additional demand for its rail fastening products on the former Deutsche Reichsbahn and elsewhere. Hoesch Maschinenfabrik Deutschland GmbH and W. Hegenscheidt GmbH, manufacturers of railway wheelset machining equipment, were acquired in the mid-1990s. In 1997, the company was first listed on the MDAX. During 1998, the railway switch manufacturing company VAE group was acquired by Voestalpine AG and Vossloh.

However, a recession in the 1990s contributed to the sale of Vossloh's "non-recession-resilient" decorative products division to Arquati S.p.A. of Italy in 1997. Under company CEO Burkhard Schuchmann during and after the 1990s, Vossloh was re-orientated as a rail-industry-based company. In 2002, the lighting division was sold to Matsushita Electric Works, Ltd. of Osaka, Japan, and the company decided to expand into the rail industry market through a number of acquisitions.

- 1996: Rail related parts of the Deutsche System Technik GmbH company (traffic management and electronic information systems) are acquired after insolvency, forming Vossloh System-Technik GmbH
- 1998: The former Krupp Maschinenbau Kiel, then under Siemens' ownership as Siemens Schienenfahrzeugtechnik
- 1998: MAN Systemelektronik acquired and added to Vossloh System-Technik GmbH
- 2000: Vossloh and Angel Trains formed a locomotive leasing business - Locomotion Partners consisting of two companies: Locomotion capital Ltd. (90% owned by Angel trains, 10% Vossloh): a locomotive procurement, rental and management company initially headquartered in London. Locomotion Service GmbH (90% owned by Vossloh, 10% Angel trains): a locomotive servicing and modification company that would initially contract its work to Vossloh SFT in Kiel. The companies would not exclusively hire and service only Vossloh locomotives, and would act independently, depending on the circumstances.^{]} In 2004, the 10% stake in Locomotion capital Ltd. was sold and the stake in Locomotion Service GmbH increased to 100%.
- 2001: A 55% stake in NovoSignal AB (Sweden), designers of electronic interlocking and process control systems
- 2001: (VAE systems acquires Transwerk Perway Pty. Ltd (South Africa), railroad switch manufacturer)
- 2002: Passenger information and entertainment systems unit of Bombardier Transportation, Germany
- 2002: Cogifer group (France) (Division Customized Modules) is acquired, and Vossloh's share in VAE group is sold to Voestalpine The Société de Construction et d’Embranchements Industriels (SEI) was founded in 1904 in Reichshoffen, Alsace, to manufacture rail switches. Reichshoffen is still an important location today. One of the French switch plants has its headquarters here, as does the technology center of Vossloh Cogifer.
- 2002: Kiepe Elektrik (Düsseldorf, Germany)
- 2002: Skamo (Nowe Skalmierzyce, Poland); railroad switch manufacturer.
- 2003: MIN Skretnice (Serbia); railroad switch manufacturer.
- 2004: The diesel locomotive manufacturer formerly known as Meinfesa (in Valencia, Spain) was acquired from Alstom during that company's time of financial difficulties.
- 2004: Swedish Rail Systems AB (Sweden); railroad switch manufacturer
- 2004: Delkor Pty. (Australia); railroad switch manufacturer
- 2004: JS Industries Private Ltd., (Hyderabad, India); 51% of shares of railroad switch manufacturer
- 2005: Daksin Transtek Ltd. (Bangalore, India); railroad switch manufacturer - joint venture with Patil group (Patil Rail Infrastructure Pvt. Ltd, India)
- 2005: Beekay Engineering & Castings Ltd. (India), 60% acquired by Vossloh Cogifer

At the end of 2005, Burkard Schuchmann is succeeded by Dr. Gerhard Eschenröder as CEO until 2007 when Werner Andree replaces him. The subsidiary, Vossloh Information Technologies GmbH was sold (February 2007) to Funkwerk AG. The company continued to expand; its first acquisition in North America was Pohl Corp (switch manufacturer), followed by Cleveland Track Material Inc., both acquired in 2007. A 100 percent stake in the French rail infrastructure company (ETF) was also obtained in 2007. The same year, the company opened a rail fastening subsidiary in China.

During 2008, Vossloh infrastructure services was sold to the VINCI group of companies - that included the infrastructure parts of Cogifer SA, acquired in 2002, as well as Européenne de Travaux Ferroviaires SA.

Further acquisitions of rail switch manufacturers took place: TLK Rail (Australia) in 2007, Sportek (Denmark) and Kloos Oving B.V. (Netherlands) in 2008, and the switch and rail manufacturing parts of the Nouva Sima Sud company (Italy) in 2009. In 2010, the company enters the rail services market in Germany, forming Vossloh Rail Services GmbH from the rail maintenance parts of Stahlberg-Roensch Group, in addition to LOG Logistikgesellschaft Gleisbau mbH and ISB Instandhaltungssysteme Bahn GmbH. A rail milling and grinding joint venture, Vossloh MFL Rail Milling GmbH, was formed in association with Maschinenfabrik Liezen und Giesserei in 2012.

In mid 2013, Knorr-Bremse owner, Heinz Hermann Thiele, became chairman of the Vossloh board, after having raised his shareholding in the company from below 5% to over 10% in March 2011, and to over 25% in 2013. Thiele's election as chair was opposed by the Vossloh family, who owned over 30% of the shares. In November 2013, the Vossloh family unexpectedly sold 22% of its shareholding, reducing their holding to under 10% and leaving Heinz Hermann Thiele as the largest shareholder in the company.

During 2014, the company launched a major restructuring. New executive board members were introduced and high level management numbers were reduced by a third, and talks started on general workforce redundancies. The transfer of locomotive production in Kiel to a more modern site was also under investigation, with three sites identified. In June 2014 Kieler Nachrichten reported that an offer had been made for Voith's locomotive plant, (Note: Voith was reported as looking to sell its Kiel plant in 2013. Voith decided to close the plant after an order of 130 locomotives (Voith Gravita) for Deutsche Bahn was completed, with no other orders; the plant had been established c.2005.) however in July the company announced it was to build a new plant at a cost of €30 million in the Suchsdorf area of Kiel. A groundbreaking ceremony for the new plant took place on 17 July 2015.

In December 2014, the company announced its intention to divest its transportation division. During November 2015, it was announced that Vossloh's rail vehicles division was to be sold to Stadler. The Electrical Systems division (formerly Vossloh Kiepe) was sold to Knorr-Bremse in 2016.

During late 2016, Vossloh acquired Rocla Concrete Tie, Inc., headquartered in Lakewood, Colorado from Altus Capital Partners II. Since 1986, the North American company mainly supplies customers in the US market with concrete thresholds. Around the same time, Vossloh has purchased the remaining 50% of the shares in the previous Alpha Rail Team joint venture.

== Company structure ==
Vossloh has three divisions contribute to the core business, rail infrastructure: Core Components, Customized Modules and Lifecycle Solutions.

Vossloh currently operates with four divisions. The fourth division, Transportation, covers the developing and manufacturing of diesel locomotives, and also provides all necessary locomotive maintenance and repair services. With the adoption of the strategy at the end of 2014, the Transportation division stopped being part of the core business.

The individual companies are centrally coordinated by the holding company, Vossloh AG, and operate in common under the Vossloh brand.

=== Core Components ===
The Core Components division manufactures standardized products on an industrial scale, which are required in large quantities for rail infrastructure.

Vossloh's business unit Fastening Systems produces rail fastening systems and components, which are used in more than 65 countries. The screw-fastened and maintenance-free elastic systems are suitable for all applications: ballasted and slab tracks, mainline and conventional lines, high-speed lines, heavy-haul and local transport. Approximately 50 million tension clamps leave Vossloh's production sites in Europe, Asia and North America every year.

The division includes Vossloh Fastening Systems GmbH (Werdohl Germany), Delkor Rail Pty. Ltd. (Australia), Patil Vossloh Rail Systems Pvt. Ltd. (joint venture with Patil Group of India), Vossloh Sistemi s.r.l. (Italy), TOO "Vossloh-Kaz" (Russia), Vossloh Utenzilija d.d. (Croatia), Vossloh Skamo Sp. z o.o. (Poland), Vossloh Tehnika Feroviara S.R.L. (Romania), Vossloh Drážní Technika s.r.o. (Czech Republic), Vossloh Rail Technology Limitet Sirketi (Turkey), Feder-7 GmbH (Hungary) and Vossloh Fastening Systems America Corporation (Chicago, USA).

Vossloh's business unit Tie Technologies is manufacturing concrete railway ties in North America. In addition, six own production sites in the US and another one in Mexico also produce switch ties, concrete low-vibration track blocks and crossing panels.

=== Customized Modules ===
The Customized Modules division develops and manufactures systems for rail infrastructure, which must be individually adapted to the customer and the project. Installation and maintenance are related Vossloh services.

Vossloh Cogifer produces railway switch systems at over 30 production sites in over 20 countries: Vossloh Nordic Switch systems AB (Sweden), KIHN (Luxembourg), Vossloh Track Material Inc. (Wilmington USA) and Cleveland Track Material Inc. (Cleveland USA) and Vossloh Cogifer Australia Pty., as well as two joint ventures Corus Cogifer Switches and Crossings, (Scunthorpe, UK) and Amurrio Ferrocarril y Equipos SA (Spain).

From 2012, Corus Cogifer Switches and Crossings was rebranded as VTS Track Technology Ltd. due to the acquisition of Corus by Tata Steel and of Cogifer by Vossloh.

Vossloh is a majority shareholder in a joint venture with the Argentine state owned infrastructure company ADIFSE called Vossloh Cogifer Argentina SA created in 2013, with a production plant located near the city of La Plata.

Amongst turnouts and crossings, Vossloh manufactures manganese frogs, switch blade, switch actuators and locking devices, signalling products and rail monitoring systems. The Vossloh offer covers all fields of application: standard, high-speed, special and heavy-haul switches, as well as solutions for urban networks.

=== Lifecycle Solutions ===
The Lifecycle Solutions division of Vossloh provides track related services. This includes welding and transportation of long rails, maintenance and preventative care of tracks and switches and reconditioning and recycling of old rails. These services also cover the lifecycle management of entire track sections.

Vossloh Rail Services provides railway track infrastructure maintenance such as rail grinding, welding, replacement and testing. The division was formed in 2010 with the acquisition of parts of the Stahlberg-Roensch Group and Logistikgesellschaft Gleisbau mbH and Instandhaltungssysteme Bahn GmbH from the Contrack Group.

=== Transportation ===
The Transportation division produces locomotives and provides related services.

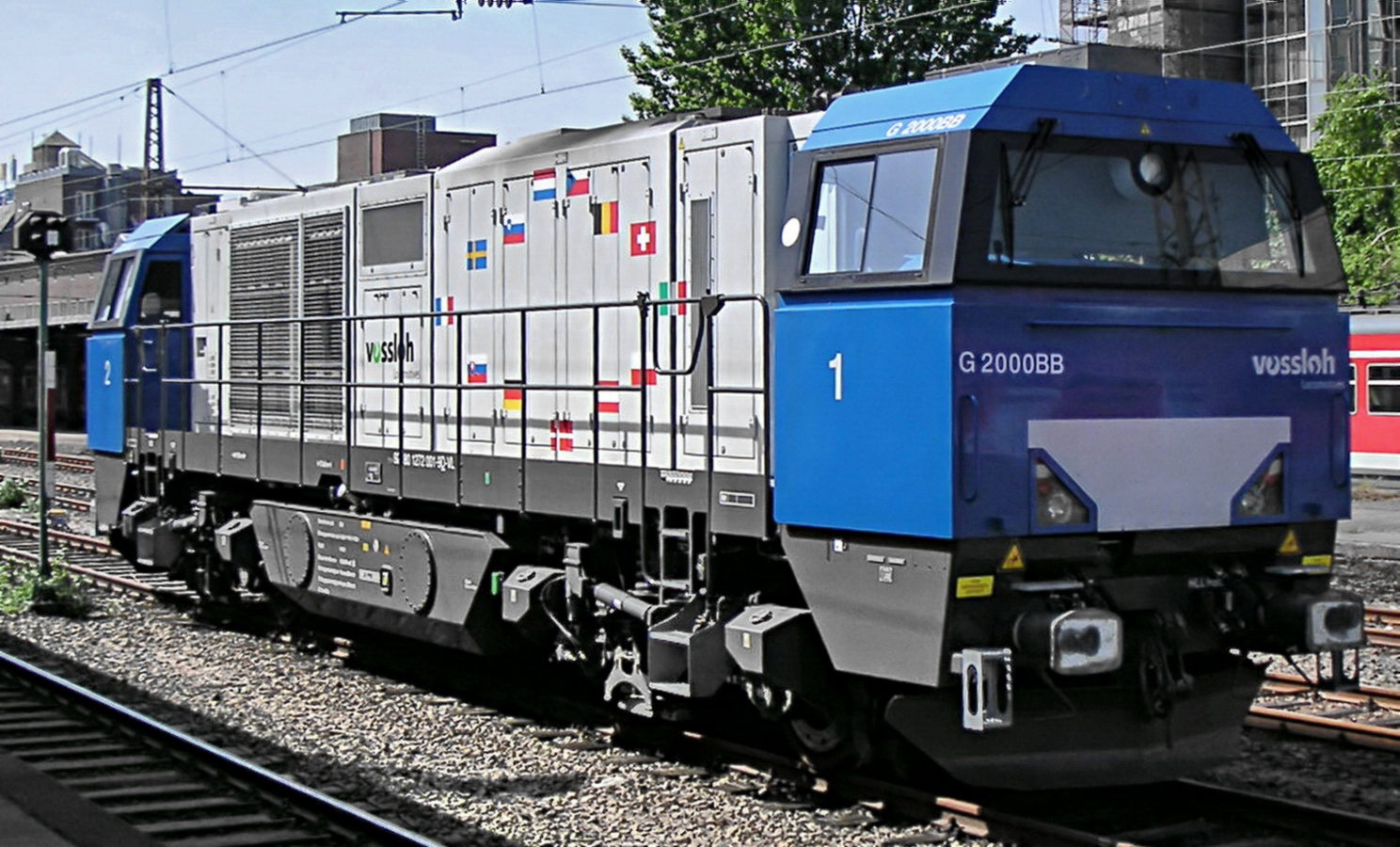
Vossloh G2000 BB Diesel-hydraulic locomotive

Vossloh Locomotives GmbH, the former MaK locomotive plant in Kiel produces diesel-electric and diesel-hydraulic centre-cab locomotives, for freight and shunting purposes, which are fitted with eco-friendly technology and are approved in many European countries.

This is complemented by services related to the maintenance and repair of locomotives, including variable financing models and options for maintenance agreements. ECM-compliant service centers are located in Germany, France and Italy. The pan-European service network also includes partner workshops and collaborations, in Sweden.

The factory's main production up to 2009 was diesel hydraulic locomotives of type Vossloh G1000 BB, Vossloh G1206, Vossloh G1700 BB and Vossloh G2000 BB. The company's major orders included G1206/1700 variants for the French (SNCF Class BB 61000) and Swiss railways (SBB Am 843).

A three axle shunting locomotive, type Vossloh G6 was introduced in 2008, in 2009 the company announced to the intention to offer diesel electric or diesel hydraulic variant of four axle centre cab locomotives in two power ranges: G 12 or DE 12 and G 18 or DE 18 (approximately corresponding to the power ranges of the G1206 and G1700 versions.)

By mid 2015, the Vossloh Eurolight series had multiple outstanding orders with the British operator Direct Rail Services and the Italian railway operator Dinazzano Po. In August 2016, Vossloh Locomotives won a €140 million contract to supply 44 DE 18 class locomotives to the French railway company Akiem S.A.S.

During May 2020, Vossloh sold its locomotives business unit to China Railway Rolling Stock Corporation Zhuzhou Locomotive Co.

== Corruption ==
In 2012, Vossloh España and front-company Swifambo signed a R3.5 billion (2012) (equivalent to R4.81 billion or US$363.15 million in 2018) contract with the Passenger Rail Agency of South Africa (PRASA). Between 2011 and 2015, Vossloh made 10 payments amounting to R89 million, to set up the Swifambo-Vossloh deal with PRASA; the South African Reserve Bank the payments as bribes. In 2018, the Supreme Court of Appeal upheld a decision by the Johannesburg High Court declaring the contract corrupt. Vossloh has not paid back the R1.87 billion it received.

== Spin-offs, divestments, and subsidiaries ==
In 2000 Vossloh and Angel Trains formed a locomotive leasing business - Locomotion Partners consisting of two companies:

- Locomotion Capital Limited (90% owned by Angel Trains, 10% Vossloh): a locomotive procurement, rental and management company initially headquartered in London.
- Locomotion Service GmbH (90% owned by Vossloh, 10% Angel Trains): a locomotive servicing and modification company that would initially contract its work to Vossloh SFT in Kiel.

The companies would not exclusively hire and service only Vossloh locomotives, and would act independently, depending on the circumstances. In 2004, the 10% stake in Locomotion capital Ltd. was sold and the stake in Locomotion Service GmbH increased to 100%.

A legal dispute between Vossloh and Alpha Trains was heard at the High Court in London concerning the difference in law between a guarantee and an indemnity. The case was determined in favour of Vossloh, the judge ruling that Vossloh's payment guarantee, which formed part of the agreement between the companies, was not payable on demand but only where there was a breach of an underlying obligation.

=== Vossloh Rail Vehicles ===
Vossloh Rail Vehicles (formerly Vossloh España) was acquired from Alstom c.2005. The former Meinfesa plant produced diesel electric locomotives as well as passenger multiple units, trams and bogies.

The company's locomotive output has included the SNCF BB 460000 (in cooperation with Alstom) and Vossloh Euro locomotives.

During 2010, the company launched a new locomotive type: the diesel electric Eurolight locomotive, designed for railways requiring axleloads less than 20t, and with either 2.3 or 2.8MW installed engine power. In September 2012, Vossloh unveiled a mockup of the "Desert Hawk" locomotive, a single ended development of its Euro locomotive design intended for use in push-pull passenger trains in hot and sandy conditions. The rail vehicles division was announced as sold to Stadler in late 2015.

=== Vossloh Locomotives ===
Vossloh Locomotives was sold to CRRC Zhuzhou Locomotive, Zhuzhou, China on May 31, 2020.

=== Vossloh Kiepe ===
Vossloh Kiepe produced electrical systems for light rail, trolleybuses and hybrid buses including electric propulsion and control, air conditioning and heating as well as passenger rail vehicle refurbishment and modernisation. The business was sold in late 2016 to Knorr-Bremse.

== See also ==
- Voestalpine : competitor in the rail turnout business
- Pandrol : competitor in the rail fastening business
