= Torque converter =

Fluid coupling that transfers rotating power from a prime mover to a rotating driven load

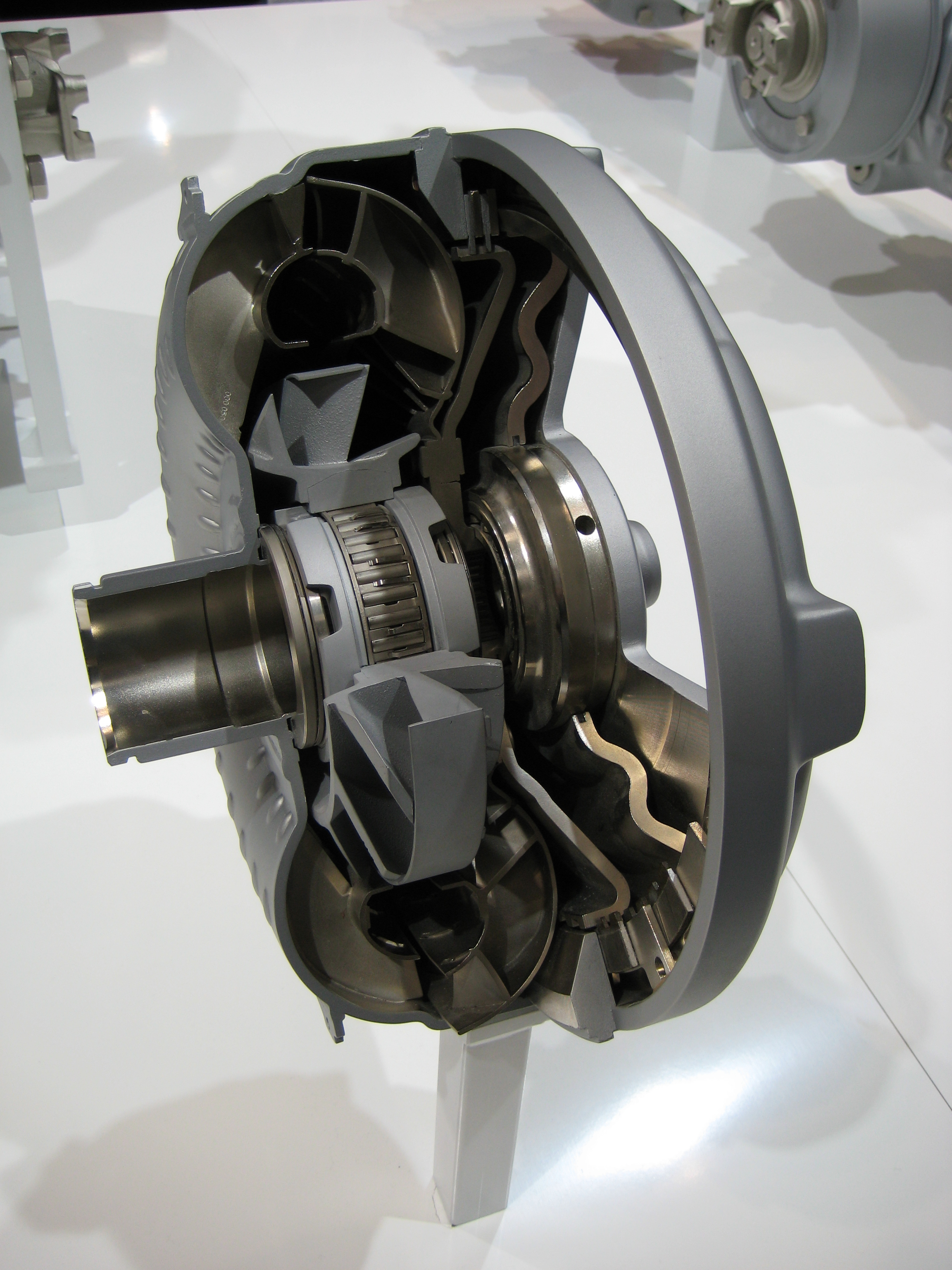
ZF torque converter cut-away

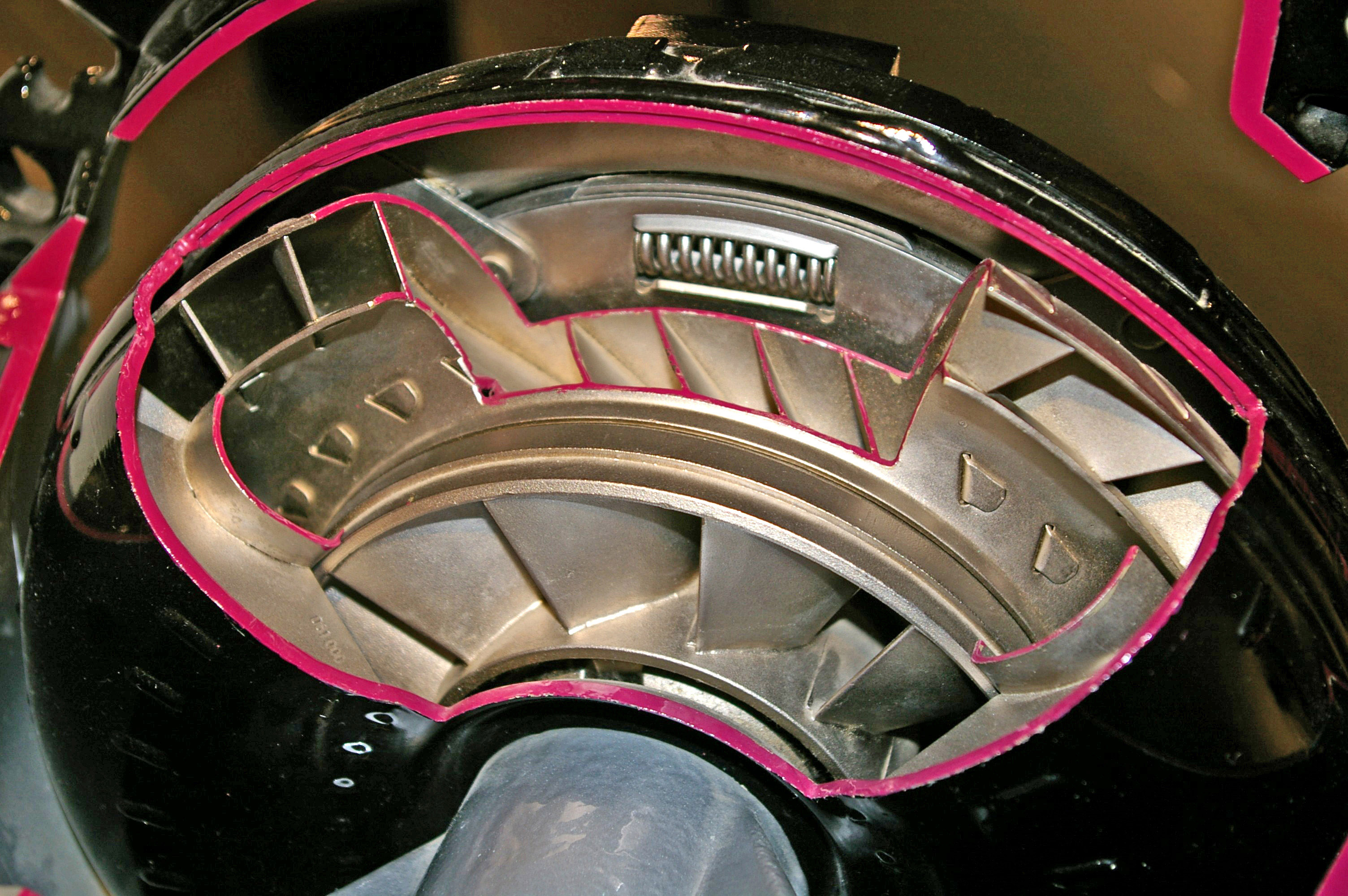
A cut-away model of a torque converter

A torque converter is a device, usually implemented as a type of fluid coupling, that transfers rotating power from a prime mover, like an internal combustion engine, to a rotating driven load. In a vehicle with an automatic transmission, the torque converter connects the prime mover to the automatic gear train, which then drives the load. It is usually located between the engine's flexplate and the transmission. The equivalent device in a manual transmission is the mechanical clutch.

A torque converter serves to increase transmitted torque when the output rotational speed is low. In the fluid coupling embodiment, it uses a fluid, driven by the vanes of an input impeller, and directed through the vanes of a fixed stator, to drive an output turbine so that torque on the output is increased when the output shaft is rotating slower than the input shaft, thus providing the equivalent of an adaptive reduction gear. This is a feature beyond what a simple fluid coupling provides, which can match rotational speed but does not multiply torque.

== Hydraulic systems ==
The most common form of torque converter in automobile transmissions is the hydrodynamic device. Fluid-coupling–based torque converters also typically include a lock-up function to rigidly couple input and output and avoid the efficiency losses associated with transmitting torque by fluid flow when operating conditions permit. There are also hydrostatic systems which are widely used in small machines such as compact excavators.

== Mechanical systems ==
Mechanical torque converters, are similar to mechanical continuously variable transmissions or capable of acting as such. They include the pendulum-based Constantinesco torque converter, the Lambert friction gearing disk drive transmission and the Variomatic with expanding pulleys and a belt drive.

== Usage ==
- Automatic transmissions on automobiles, such as cars, buses, and on/off highway trucks.
- Diesel-hydraulic locomotives and multiple units
- Forwarders and other heavy duty vehicles.
- Marine propulsion systems.
- Industrial power transmission such as conveyor drives, almost all modern forklifts, winches, drilling rigs, construction equipment, and diesel-hydraulic railway locomotives.

== Function ==
=== Theory of operation ===
Torque converter equations of motion are governed by Leonhard Euler's eighteenth century turbomachine equation:

$$\tau = \sum \left [  r \times \frac{d}{dt} \left ( m \cdot v \right ) \right ]$$

The equation expands to include the fifth power of radius; as a result, torque converter properties are very dependent on the size of the device.

Mathematical formulations for the torque converter are available from several authors.

Hrovat derived the equations of the pump, turbine, stator, and conservation of energy. Four first-order differential equations can define the performance of the torque converter.

$I_i \dot{\omega_i} + \rho S_i \dot{Q} = -\rho (\omega_i R_i^2 + R_i \frac{Q}{A}\tan{\alpha_i} - \omega_\mathrm{s} R_\mathrm{s}^2 - R_\mathrm{s} \frac{Q}{A} \tan{\alpha_\mathrm{s}} ) Q + \tau_i$

$I_\mathrm{t} \dot{\omega_\mathrm{t}} + \rho S_\mathrm{t} \dot{Q} = -\rho (\omega_\mathrm{t} R_\mathrm{t}^2 + R_\mathrm{t} \frac{Q}{A}\tan{\alpha_\mathrm{t}} - \omega_i R_i^2 - R_i \frac{Q}{A} \tan{\alpha_i} ) Q + \tau_\mathrm{t}$

$I_\mathrm{s} \dot{\omega_\mathrm{s}} + \rho S_\mathrm{s} \dot{Q} = -\rho (\omega_\mathrm{s} R_\mathrm{s}^2 + R_\mathrm{s} \frac{Q}{A}\tan{\alpha_\mathrm{s}} - \omega_\mathrm{t} R_\mathrm{t}^2 - R_\mathrm{t} \frac{Q}{A} \tan{\alpha_\mathrm{t}} ) Q + \tau_\mathrm{s}$

$\rho (S_\mathrm{p} \dot{w_\mathrm{p}} + S_\mathrm{t} \dot{w_\mathrm{t}}+ S_\mathrm{s} \dot{w_\mathrm{s}}) + \rho \frac{L_\mathrm{f}}{A} \dot{Q} = \rho (R_\mathrm{p}^2 w_\mathrm{p}^2 + R_\mathrm{t}^2 w_\mathrm{t}^2 + R_\mathrm{s}^2 w_\mathrm{s}^2 - R_\mathrm{s}^2 w_\mathrm{p} w_\mathrm{s} - R_\mathrm{p}^2 w_\mathrm{t} w_\mathrm{p} - R_\mathrm{t}^2 w_\mathrm{s} w_\mathrm{t}) + w_\mathrm{p} \frac{Q}{A} \rho (R_\mathrm{p} \tan{a_\mathrm{p}} - R_\mathrm{s} \tan{a_\mathrm{s}}) + w_\mathrm{t} \frac{Q}{A} \rho (R_\mathrm{t} \tan{a_\mathrm{t}} - R_\mathrm{p} \tan{a_\mathrm{p}}) + w_\mathrm{s} \frac{Q}{A} \rho (R_\mathrm{s} \tan{a_\mathrm{s}} - R_\mathrm{t} \tan{a_\mathrm{t}}) - P_L$

where

- $\rho$ is density
- $A$ is flow area
- $R_\mathrm{p}$ is pump radius
- $R_\mathrm{t}$ is turbine radius
- $R_\mathrm{s}$ is stator radius
- $a_\mathrm{p}$ is pump exit angle
- $a_\mathrm{t}$ is turbine exit angle
- $a_\mathrm{s}$ is stator exit angle
- $I$ is inertia
- $L_\mathrm{f}$ is fluid inertia length

A simpler correlation is provided by Kotwicki.

=== Torque converter elements ===
A fluid coupling is a two-element drive that is incapable of multiplying torque, while a torque converter has at least one extra element—the stator—which alters the drive's characteristics during periods of high slippage, producing an increase in output torque.

In a torque converter there are at least three rotating elements: the impeller, which is mechanically driven by the prime mover; the turbine, which drives the load; and the stator, which is interposed between the impeller and turbine so that it can alter oil flow returning from the turbine to the impeller. The classic torque converter design dictates that the stator be prevented from rotating under any condition, hence the term stator. In practice, however, the stator is mounted on an overrunning clutch, which prevents the stator from counter-rotating with respect to the prime mover but allows forward rotation.

Modifications to the basic three element design have been periodically incorporated, especially in applications where higher than normal torque multiplication is required. Most commonly, these have taken the form of multiple turbines and stators, each set being designed to produce differing amounts of torque multiplication. For example, the Buick Dynaflow automatic transmission was a non-shifting design and, under normal conditions, relied solely upon the converter to multiply torque. The Dynaflow used a five-element converter to produce the wide range of torque multiplication needed to propel a heavy vehicle.

Although not strictly a part of classic torque converter design, many automotive converters include a lock-up clutch to improve cruising power transmission efficiency and reduce heat. The application of the clutch locks the turbine to the impeller, causing all power transmission to be mechanical, thus eliminating losses associated with fluid drive.

=== Operational phases ===
A torque converter has three stages of operation:

- Stall. The prime mover is applying power to the impeller but the turbine cannot rotate. For example, in an automobile, this stage of operation would occur when the driver has placed the transmission in gear but is preventing the vehicle from moving by continuing to apply the brakes. At stall, the torque converter can produce maximum torque multiplication if sufficient input power is applied (the resulting multiplication is called the stall ratio.) The stall phase actually lasts for a brief period when the load (e.g., vehicle) initially starts to move, as there will be a very large difference between pump and turbine speed.
- Acceleration. The load is accelerating but there still is a relatively large difference between impeller and turbine speed. Under this condition, the converter will produce torque multiplication that is less than what could be achieved under stall conditions. The amount of multiplication will depend upon the actual difference between pump and turbine speed, as well as various other design factors.
- Coupling. The turbine has reached approximately 90 percent of the speed of the impeller. Torque multiplication has essentially ceased and the torque converter is behaving in a manner similar to a simple fluid coupling. In modern automotive applications, it is usually at this stage of operation where the lock-up clutch is applied, a procedure that tends to improve fuel efficiency.

The key to the torque converter's ability to multiply torque lies in the stator. In the classic fluid coupling design, periods of high slippage cause the fluid flow returning from the turbine to the impeller to oppose the direction of impeller rotation, leading to a significant loss of efficiency and the generation of considerable waste heat. Under the same condition in a torque converter, the returning fluid will be redirected by the stator so that it aids the rotation of the impeller, instead of impeding it. The result is that much of the energy in the returning fluid is recovered and added to the energy being applied to the impeller by the prime mover. This action causes a substantial increase in the mass of fluid being directed to the turbine, producing an increase in output torque. Since the returning fluid is initially traveling in a direction opposite to impeller rotation, the stator will likewise attempt to counter-rotate as it forces the fluid to change direction, an effect that is prevented by the one-way stator clutch.

Unlike the radially straight blades used in a plain fluid coupling, a torque converter's turbine and stator use angled and curved blades. The blade shape of the stator is what alters the path of the fluid, forcing it to coincide with the impeller rotation. The matching curve of the turbine blades helps to correctly direct the returning fluid to the stator so the latter can do its job. The shape of the blades is important as minor variations can result in significant changes to the converter's performance.

During the stall and acceleration phases, in which torque multiplication occurs, the stator remains stationary due to the action of its one-way clutch. However, as the torque converter approaches the coupling phase, the energy and volume of the fluid returning from the turbine will gradually decrease, causing pressure on the stator to likewise decrease. Once in the coupling phase, the returning fluid will reverse direction and now rotate in the direction of the impeller and turbine, an effect which will attempt to forward-rotate the stator. At this point, the stator clutch will release and the impeller, turbine and stator will all (more or less) turn as a unit.

Unavoidably, some of the fluid's kinetic energy will be lost due to friction and turbulence, causing the converter to generate waste heat (dissipated in many applications by water cooling.) This effect, often referred to as pumping loss, will be most pronounced at or near stall conditions. In modern designs, the blade geometry minimizes oil velocity at low impeller speeds, which allows the turbine to be stalled for long periods with little danger of overheating (as when a vehicle with an automatic transmission is stopped at a traffic signal or in traffic congestion while still in gear.)

=== Efficiency and torque multiplication ===
A torque converter cannot achieve 100 percent coupling efficiency. The classic three element torque converter has an efficiency curve that resembles ∩: zero efficiency at stall, generally increasing efficiency during the acceleration phase and low efficiency in the coupling phase. The loss of efficiency as the converter enters the coupling phase is a result of the turbulence and fluid flow interference generated by the stator, and as previously mentioned, is commonly overcome by mounting the stator on a one-way clutch.

Even with the benefit of the one-way stator clutch, a converter cannot achieve the same level of efficiency in the coupling phase as an equivalently sized fluid coupling. Some loss is due to the presence of the stator (even though rotating as part of the assembly), as it always generates some power-absorbing turbulence. Most of the loss, however, is caused by the curved and angled turbine blades, which do not absorb kinetic energy from the fluid mass as well as radially straight blades. Since the turbine blade geometry is a crucial factor in the converter's ability to multiply torque, trade-offs between torque multiplication and coupling efficiency are inevitable. In automotive applications, where steady improvements in fuel economy have been mandated by market forces and government edict, the nearly universal use of a lock-up clutch has helped to eliminate the converter from the efficiency equation during cruising operation.

The maximum amount of torque multiplication produced by a converter is highly dependent on the size and geometry of the turbine and stator blades, and is generated only when the converter is at or near the stall phase of operation. Typical stall torque multiplication ratios range from 1.8:1 to 2.5:1 for most automotive applications. Specialized converters designed for industrial, rail, or heavy marine power transmission systems are capable of as much as 5.0:1 multiplication. Generally speaking, there is a trade-off between maximum torque multiplication and efficiency—high stall ratio converters tend to be relatively inefficient around the coupling speed, whereas low stall ratio converters tend to provide less possible torque multiplication.

The characteristics of the torque converter must be carefully matched to the torque curve of the power source and the intended application. Changing the blade geometry of the stator and/or turbine will change the torque-stall characteristics, as well as the overall efficiency of the unit. For example, drag racing automatic transmissions often use converters modified to produce high stall speeds to improve off-the-line torque, and to get into the power band of the engine more quickly. Highway vehicles generally use lower stall torque converters to limit heat production, and provide a more firm feeling to the vehicle's characteristics.

A design feature once found in some General Motors automatic transmissions was the variable-pitch stator, in which the blades' angle of attack could be varied in response to changes in engine speed and load. The effect of this was to vary the amount of torque multiplication produced by the converter. At the normal angle of attack, the stator caused the converter to produce a moderate amount of multiplication but with a higher level of efficiency. If the driver abruptly opened the throttle, a valve would switch the stator pitch to a different angle of attack, increasing torque multiplication at the expense of efficiency.

Some torque converters use multiple stators and/or multiple turbines to provide a wider range of torque multiplication. Such multiple-element converters are more common in industrial environments than in automotive transmissions, but automotive applications such as Buick's Triple Turbine Dynaflow and Chevrolet's Turboglide also existed. The Buick Dynaflow utilized the torque-multiplying characteristics of its planetary gear set in conjunction with the torque converter for low gear and bypassed the first turbine, using only the second turbine as vehicle speed increased. The unavoidable trade-off with this arrangement was low efficiency and eventually these transmissions were discontinued in favor of the more efficient three speed units with a conventional three element torque converter. It is also found that efficiency of torque converter is maximum at very low speeds.

=== Lock-up torque converters ===
As described above, impelling losses within the torque converter reduce efficiency and generate waste heat. In modern automotive applications, this problem is commonly avoided by use of a lock-up clutch that physically links the impeller and turbine, effectively changing the converter into a purely mechanical coupling. The result is no slippage, and virtually no power loss.

The first automotive application of the lock-up principle was Packard's Ultramatic transmission, introduced in 1949, which locked up the converter at cruising speeds, unlocking when the throttle was floored for quick acceleration or as the vehicle slowed. This feature was also present in some Borg-Warner transmissions produced during the 1950s. It fell out of favor in subsequent years due to its extra complexity and cost. In the late 1970s lock-up clutches started to reappear in response to demands for improved fuel economy, and are now nearly universal in automotive applications.

=== Capacity and failure modes ===
As with a basic fluid coupling the theoretical torque capacity of a converter is proportional to $r\,N^2D^5$, where $r$ is the mass density of the fluid (kg/m^{3}), $N$ is the impeller speed (rpm), and $D$ is the diameter (m). In practice, the maximum torque capacity is limited by the mechanical characteristics of the materials used in the converter's components, as well as the ability of the converter to dissipate heat (often through water cooling.) As an aid to strength, reliability and economy of production, most automotive converter housings are of welded construction. Industrial units are usually assembled with bolted housings, a design feature that eases the process of inspection and repair, but adds to the cost of producing the converter.

In high performance, racing and heavy duty commercial converters, the pump and turbine may be further strengthened by a process called furnace brazing, in which molten brass is drawn into seams and joints to produce a stronger bond between the blades, hubs and annular ring(s). Because the furnace brazing process creates a small radius at the point where a blade meets with a hub or annular ring, a theoretical decrease in turbulence will occur, resulting in a corresponding increase in efficiency.

Overloading a converter can result in several failure modes, some of them potentially dangerous in nature:

- Overheating: Continuous high levels of slippage may overwhelm the converter's ability to dissipate heat, resulting in damage to the elastomer seals that retain fluid inside the converter. A prime example in passenger cars would be getting stuck in snow or mud and having to rock the vehicle forward and backward to gain momentum by going back and forth from drive to reverse using significant power. The transmission fluid will quickly overheat, not to mention the repeated impacts on the stator clutch. Also, overheating transmission fluid causes it to lose viscosity and damage the transmission. Such abuse can in rare cases cause the torque converter to leak and eventually stop functioning due to lack of fluid.
- Stator clutch seizure: The inner and outer elements of the one-way stator clutch become permanently locked together, thus preventing the stator from rotating during the coupling phase. Most often, seizure is precipitated by severe loading and subsequent distortion of the clutch components. Eventually, galling of the mating parts occurs, which triggers seizure. A converter with a seized stator clutch will exhibit very poor efficiency during the coupling phase, and in a motor vehicle, fuel consumption will drastically increase. Converter overheating under such conditions will usually occur if continued operation is attempted.
- Stator clutch breakage: A very abrupt application of power, as in putting the transmission in neutral and increasing engine RPMs before engaging a gear (commonly called a "neutral start"), can cause shock loading of the stator clutch, resulting in breakage. If this occurs, the stator will freely counter-rotate in the direction opposite to that of the pump and almost no power transmission will take place. In an automobile, the effect is similar to a severe case of transmission slippage and the vehicle is all but incapable of moving under its own power.
- Blade deformation and fragmentation: If subjected to abrupt loading or excessive heating of the converter, pump and/or turbine blades may be deformed, separated from their hubs and/or annular rings, or may break up into fragments. At the least, such a failure will result in a significant loss of efficiency, producing symptoms similar (although less pronounced) to those accompanying stator clutch failure. In extreme cases, catastrophic destruction of the converter will occur.
- Ballooning: Prolonged operation under excessive loading, very abrupt application of load, or operating a torque converter at very high RPM may cause the shape of the converter's housing to be physically distorted due to internal pressure and/or the stress imposed by inertia. Under extreme conditions, ballooning will cause the converter housing to rupture, resulting in the violent dispersal of hot oil and metal fragments over a wide area.

== Manufacturers ==
=== Current ===
- Aisin AW, used in automobiles
- Allison Transmission, used in bus, refuse, fire, construction, distribution, military and specialty applications
- BorgWarner, used in automobiles
- Exedy, used in automobiles
- Isuzu, used in automobiles
- Jatco, used in automobiles
- LuK USA LLC, produces Torque Converters for Ford, GM, Allison Transmission, and Hyundai
- Subaru, used in automobiles
- Twin Disc, used in vehicle, marine and oilfield applications
- Valeo, produces Torque converter for Ford, GM, Mazda, Subaru
- Voith turbo transmissions, used in many diesel locomotives and diesel multiple units
- ZF Friedrichshafen, automobiles, forestry machines, popular in city bus applications

=== Past ===
- Lysholm-Smith, named after its inventor, Alf Lysholm, produced by Leyland Motors and used in buses from 1933 to 1939 and also some British Rail Derby Lightweight and Ulster Transport Authority diesel multiple units
- Mekydro, developed by Maybach and manufactured in the UK by J. Stone & Co under license. Used in British Rail Class 35 Hymek locomotives.
- Packard, used in the Ultramatic automobile transmission system
- Rolls-Royce (Twin Disc), used in some British United Traction diesel multiple units
- Vickers-Coates

== See also ==
- Clutch
- Fluid coupling
- Servomechanism
- Torque amplifier
- Transmission (mechanics)
- Water brake
