= Kirkenes–Bjørnevatn Line =

Railway line in Sør-Varanger, Norway

Coordinates: 69.715°N 30.032°E

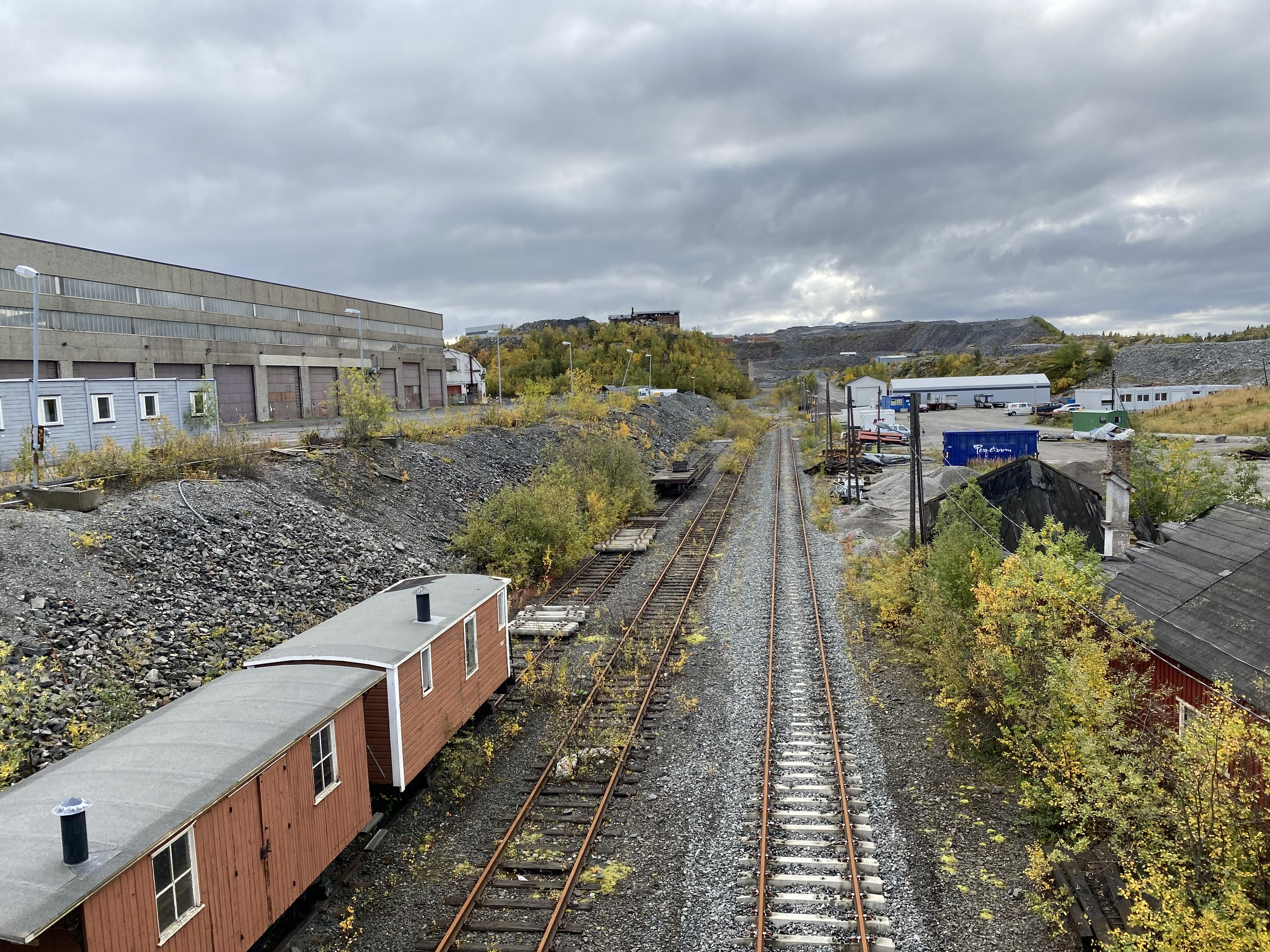
- Kirkenes–Bjørnevatn railway line in 2023, looking southward from Bjørnevatn towards the mine

Overview
- Owner: Northern Iron
- Termini: Kirkenes Station; Bjørnevatn Station

Service
- Type: Railway
- Operator(s): Northern Iron
- Rolling stock: Vossloh G 1000 BB

History
- Opened: 13 July 1910

Technical
- Line length: 8.5 km (5.3 mi)
- Number of tracks: Single
- Character: Iron ore
- Track gauge: 1,435 mm (4 ft 8 1/2 in) standard gauge
- Electrification: 1912–55
- Operating speed: 45 km/h (28 mph)
- Highest elevation: 77.0 m (252.6 ft) AMSL
Route map

The Kirkenes–Bjørnevatn Line (Norwegian: Kirkenes–Bjørnevatnbanen), or the Sydvaranger Line (Sydvarangerbanen), is a 8.5-kilometer (5.3 mi) long railway line between Kirkenes and Bjørnevatn in Sør-Varanger Municipality, Norway. Owned by the private mining company Northern Iron, the single-track railway is solely used to haul 20 daily iron ore trains from Bjørnevatn Mine to the port at Kirkenes. It was the world's northernmost railway until 2010, when the Obskaya–Bovanenkovo Line in Russia went further north.

The line was built by the mining company Sydvaranger, who started construction in 1907 and inaugurated the railway in 1910. From 1912, the port network received electrification, as did the mainline in 1920. Originally, free passenger trains services were also offered. During the Second World War, the line was largely destroyed, but rebuilt afterwards and re-opened in 1952. Electric traction was abandoned in 1955 when two EMD G12 diesel locomotives were bought. The line closed in 1997, but was reopened in 2009, following a change in ownership of the mine. There are proposals to connect the line to either one or both of the Finnish and Russian railway networks.

== Route ==
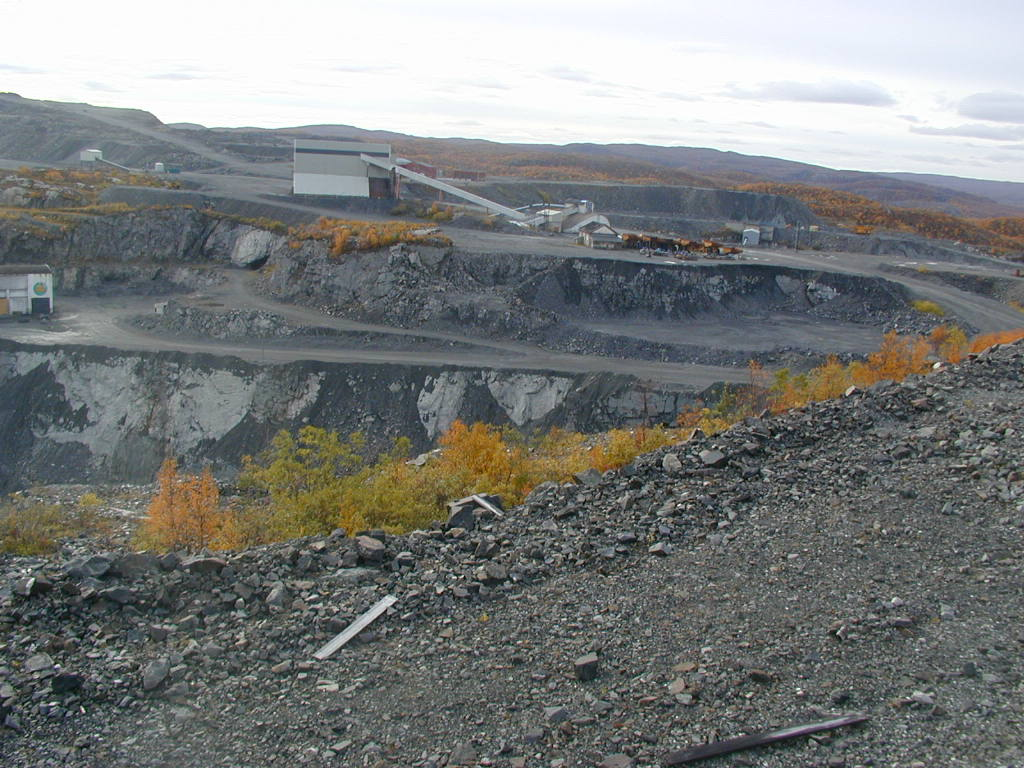
The main facility of Bjørnevatn Mine, which constitutes the southern terminus of the line

The Kirkenes–Bjørnevatn Line is 8,484 meters (27,835 ft) long and runs from Bjørnevatn Mine to Kirkenes Port. While the line had passenger transport, it had two stations, Kirkenes Station and Bjørnevatn Station, which were located 7.5 kilometers (4.7 mi) from each other. A third station, Armeverplegungslager, was only used during the Second World War and immediately afterwards and was located 5.01 kilometers (3.11 mi) from Kirkenes Station. The railway is standard gauge, non-electrified and single track.

Starting at Bjørnevatn, the railway line starts underground at a silo, 77.0 meters (252.6 ft) above mean sea level (AMSL). From Bjørnevatn, the line starts to fall with a 0.3-percent gradient. After passing the residential area, the gradient drops to 1.5 percent. On this section, the line passes through its only tunnel, which is 68 meters (223 ft) long. The line then runs along a flatter terrain, and crosses through a 450-meter (1,480 ft) long cutting towards the lowest point of the line, at 50.4 meters (165 ft) AMSL.

The railway then runs under European Road E6 and starts climbing at a 1.0-percent gradient until reaching 56.2 meters (184 ft) AMSL. From this point to Kirkenes it runs next to the E6, and passes by the lakes Tredjevatn, Stuorrajávn and Førstevatn. While the first part of this section is flat, towards Kirkenes the landscape is more rolling. The line passes Kirkenes Station, which is 59.5 meters (195 ft) AMSL. The swing towards the station is as a curve radius of 275 meters (902 ft), while the remaining part of the line has a minimum radius of 300 meters (980 ft). The line terminates at the silo in Kirkenes after running over an elevated section, nicknamed the Air Bridge.

== History ==
=== Construction ===
Iron ore was discovered at Bjørnevatn in 1866. The ore was of poor quality, but lay close to the surface—allowing for open-pit mining, had large deposits and was located close to a port. The mining company Sydvaranger was established by German and Swedish investors in 1906. A separation plant was built in Kirkenes and the company decided to transport all ore from the mine to the port by rail. Inge T. Wiull, former manager of the Valdres Line, was hired as divisional leader for the construction of the railway, the port and the residential areas.

Construction of the railway was given high priority to as early as possible aid in transport of workers to the mining sites. Both stations were completed in 1908, the same year as the laying of tracks started. The line originally had a rail profile of 30 kilograms per meter (60 lb/yd). The first steam locomotive, built at Hamar Jernstøperi, was delivered during the fall of 1908. For the tracks in the mine, a shunter was needed and the company bought a fireless locomotive. At the time of the opening, the line was 7.5 kilometers (4.7 mi) long, in addition to tracks at both Kirkenes and Bjørnevatn. Both stations received a turntable, while Kirkenes also received water tower, motive power depot and a workshop. Bjørnevatn Station received a depot for the fireless locomotive. Tracks were laid through the open-pit mine, with the length varying. For instance, in 1910 there were 5 kilometers (3 mi) of tracks in the mine.

Mining started on 7 July 1910, with the first ore train being run on 13 July. The first shipload left Kirkenes on 11 October, but SS Bengal sank with the first shipment. In 1911, the system exported 330,000 tonnes of ore. The railway was also used for transporting workers, with trains running from the towns to the plants in the morning and returning after the working day was over. Prior to private cars becoming common, the railway operated a passenger carriage on the trains between Kirkenes and Bjørnevatn—allowing free travel. The railway has never had any scheduled or public transport of passengers, but the company's concession specifies that the authorities could at a later date require the company to operate public passenger services under specified conditions.

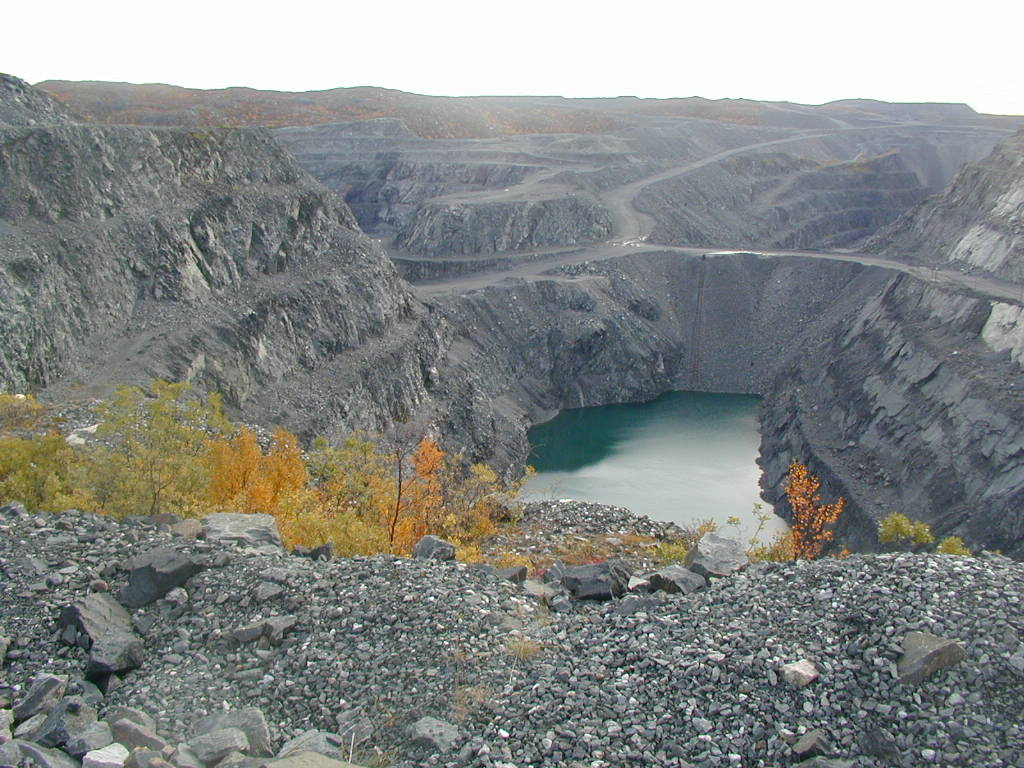
Bjørnevatn Mine

=== Electrification ===
In 1910, construction started of an electric power supply for tracks at the port. Originally it had 500 volts direct current, but this was later reduced to 400 volts. Because an overhead wire could interfere with the cranes, third-rail conduction was chosen. However, because of the possibility of iron slimes spilling onto the tracks, the railway chose to use two conductor rails, one on each side of the track, and avoid the return current running through the tracks. The electric components were delivered by Siemens-Schuckert and were taken into use in 1912. The company took delivery of two electric locomotives, both with a Bo wheel arrangement, in 1910 and 1911. Sydvaranger operated one port train every 45 minutes, consisting of one locomotive and four hopper cars, with a combined 25 tonnes (25 long tons; 28 short tons) of ore.

The original system was designed for an export capacity of 650,000 tonnes (640,000 long tons; 720,000 short tons), and in 1913, the company exported 427,000 tonnes (420,000 long tons; 471,000 short tons) and had 1,150 employees. The company initiated plans to start electrification of the mainline, but the plans were placed on hold during the First World War. Sales plummeted during the war. At first, the mining company stored the overproduction, but later production was reduced significantly. In 1918, the tracks at the mine were electrified at 750 volts direct current. Two 50-tonne (49-long-ton; 55-short-ton) Bo'Bo' locomotives were delivered by Siemens-Schuckert and Skabo Jernbanevognfabrikk in 1917. The following year, another Bo-locomotive was built for the port. Power was secured with the construction of Jarfjord Power Station. However, lack of materials after the war delayed the electrification of the mainline railway until 1920. Also the port received overhead wires, as the third rail caused problems for snow removal. The new electric system was taken into use on 23 December 1920.

In the 1920s, the economy fell into a low conjuncture, forcing Sydvaranger to file for bankruptcy in 1925. However, the facilities were quickly reopened. Two new Bo-locomotives, which could operate both on the mainline and at the port, were delivered in 1930. Built by Siemens-Schuckert, they were christened Lisa and Sonja. Two mainline Bo'Bo' locomotives were delivered by Siemens-Schuckert in 1935, which were named Oscar and Ivar. They were followed by the Bo Laila and Gerd two years later—which could operate both on the mainline and at the port. During the late 1930s, the railway company started replacing the rails with heavier 35 kilograms per meter (70 lb/yd) rails, although this work was not completed. The final electric locomotive was a Siemens-Schukert-built Bo unit delivered for the port in 1940. In 1938, the last year before production was reduced because of the Second World War, the mine exported 900,000 tonnes (890,000 long tons; 990,000 short tons).

=== Occupation and reconstruction ===
After the occupation of Norway by Nazi Germany, mining continued under German administration until January 1942. Kirkenes and the areas along the railway and at the mine were being used to store material for Wehrmacht. To allow better capacity to ship out the materials, in 1942, a 2.5-kilometer (1.6 mi) branch line was built to Haganes. Known as the Port Line (Norwegian: Havnebanen, German: Hafenbahn), the line was completed in 1943 and demolished after the war. Wehrmacht also established the "Armeeverpflegungslager" (army rations storage) Station, which was used during and for a short period after the war. From the spring of 1944, German authorities ordered that mining was to resume, and allocated two steam locomotives and thirty hopper cars to the line. A new depot was built for the German rolling stock.

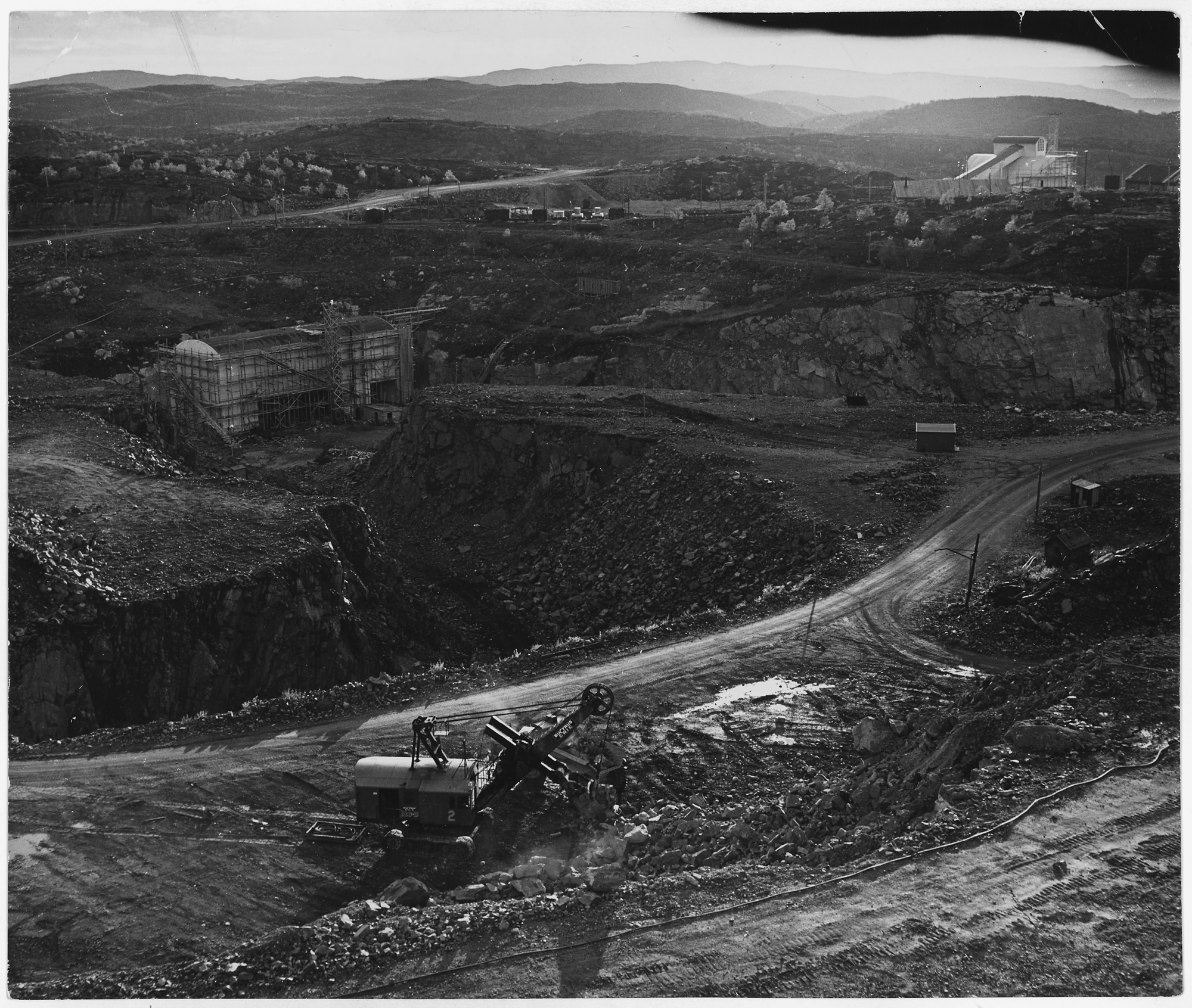
Reconstruction after the war

As part of Operation Nordlicht, Kirkenes was scorched, causing extensive damage to the mining company's infrastructure. During the reconstruction, Sydvaranger needed to transport large machinery to Bjørnevatn, so the loading gauge was increased to 6 meters (20 ft). All heavy transport during the reconstruction was done using railway, and tracks were laid throughout the mining facility. From 1945, passenger trains ran between the two settlements, at first with steam locomotives, and from 1950 with electric locomotives. New storage silos were built in Bjørnevatn, but from operations started, transport within the mine was performed using trackless machinery. A new port facility was built in Kirkenes, with the line terminating at the Air Bridge, an elevated railway which led to the plant. Mining operations and revenue service on the railway did not start until 1952.

The Directorate for Enemy Property took over the German portion of the ownership of Sydvaranger after the war. In 1948, ownership of the company was transferred to the state. The initial post-war plans were to use the existing rolling stock. The only remaining locomotive which could haul an ore train from the mine to the port was Oskar, which could haul up to 14 hopper cars and a train weight of 800 tonnes (790 long tons; 880 short tons). However, the locomotive proved unreliable, so Sydvaranger decided to order new locomotives. The electric traction was taken out of use in 1955, but the overhead wires remained until 1963. Two G12 diesel-electric locomotives were delivered from General Motors Electro-Motive Division in 1954 and 1956. The Bo'Bo' units had a power output of 977 kilowatts (1,310 hp). In addition, new hopper cars were built by Skabo.

To allow for larger trains, the permanent way was upgraded. The rail profiles were upgraded to 49 kilograms per meter (78 lb/yd), were continuously welded and the gravel ballast was replaced with crushed stone. The distance of the line was after the upgrades 8,484 meters (5.272 mi). The upgrades allowed the maximum axle load to be increased to 22 tonnes (22 long tons; 24 short tons) and the train weight to increased to 1,800 tonnes (1,800 long tons; 2,000 short tons). A nominal train consisted of 20 hopper cars with air brakes. In 1960, work started on demolishing the tracks at the port, followed by all tracks at the workshop at Kirkenes the following year. From then, all non-ore transport in the company was taken over using road transport. The three remaining electric shunters and the steam locomotive were scrapped. Two diesel shunters were sold to Norsk Jernverk in Mo i Rana. Up until this point, the railway had operated 33 steam locomotives, 14 electric locomotives and 4 diesel locomotives.

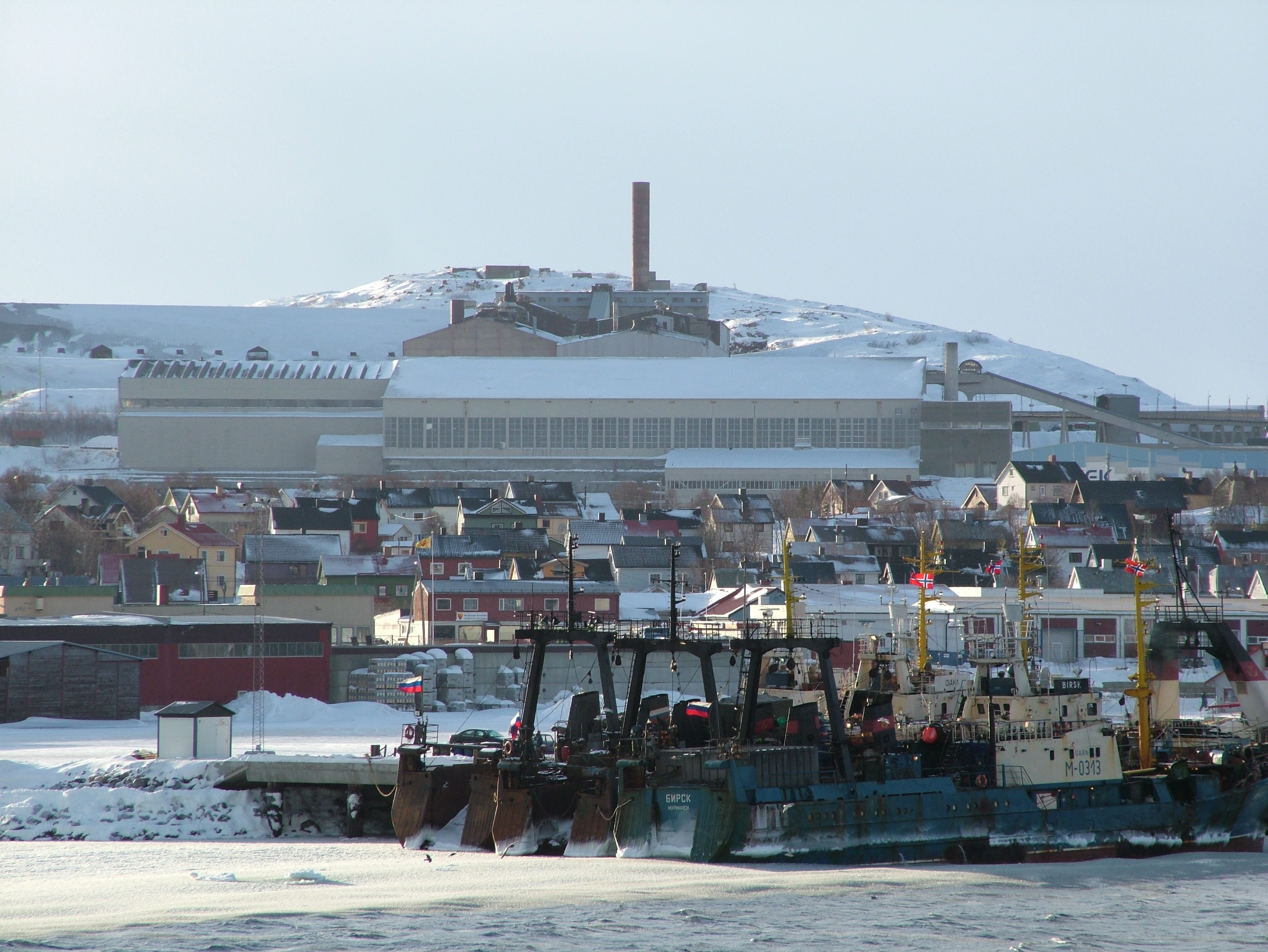
Kirkenes harbour, with the separator plant in the background

In 1980, the mine's production peaked with an export of 2.4 million tonnes and 1,000 employees. In 1984, to improve the workplace environment, a used Allmänna Svenska Elektriska Aktiebolaget (ASEA)-built T45 locomotive was bought from Sweden. However, it suffered several breakdowns and was retired in 1989. As a replacement, a new G 1203 BB was bought from Maschinenbau Kiel and was delivered to Kirkenes on 8 February 1991. In 1988, the first part of the Kirkenes plant was closed, and the mining company drastically reduced production because its owner, the Ministry of Trade and Industry, would no longer subsidize operations. All mining ceased in the spring of 1996, and the last load of ore was hauled in April 1997. After operations closed, the oldest G12 was transferred to Sør-Varanger Museum.

=== Reopening ===
Arctic Bulk Minerals bought the mining rights, and operated a train once to twice a year to keep the track and rolling stock maintained. This company filed for bankruptcy in 2002. The mining company was then bought by the local power company Varanger Kraft and Sør-Varanger Municipality. In 2006, they sold the mining company to Tschudi Group for 102 million Norwegian krone (NOK). The Tschudi Group established Northern Iron, registered in Perth, Australia, as a holding company to own the mining company. Operations in the mine and on the line resumed in 2009, after the price of iron had risen dramatically since the closure of the mine. With the opening of the mine, production is estimated at 3 million tonnes of export per year. The Kirkenes–Bjørnevatn Line was the northernmost railway in the world until 2010, when Russia's Obskaya–Bovanenkovo Line was opened.

To haul the trains, the mining company took delivery of a Vossloh G1000 BB. Built new in 2009, it was delivered to Kirkenes on 12 February 2010. The unit deviates from standard production by having its maximum speed reduced by software from 100 to 45 kilometers per hour (62 to 28 mph); it is further equipped with snowploughs, air supply to open the hopper car doors, radio remote control and janney couplers. As a back-up, the company will retain the MaK G 1203. The old hopper cars were renovated and put into service, while the track received new concrete ties. The train runs up to 20 trips per day.

On 18 November 2015 the mining company went into bankruptcy.

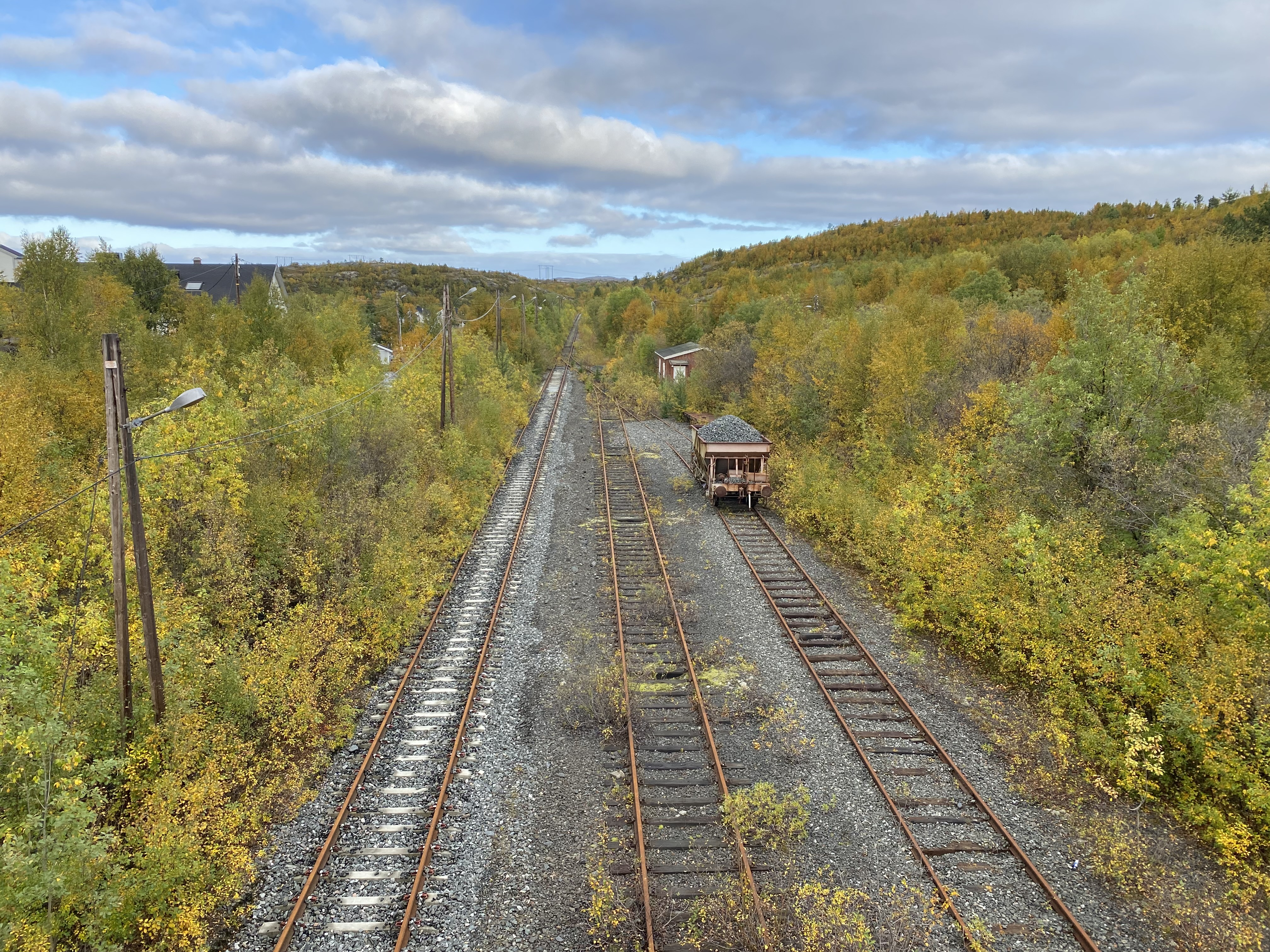
Kirkenes-Bjørnevatn railway line in 2023, looking northward from Bjørnevatn towards the coast

== Expansion ==
In the Railway Plan of 1923, Parliament decided to extend the Nordland Line from Fauske to Vadsø with a branch to Kirkenes. During the Second World War, the Wehrmacht revitalized the plans to build a railway to Kirkenes. No more than the unfinished Polar Line was built and there were never any railways built north of Narvik and the Ofoten Line. However, detailed plans were made for the line, including surveying geological conditions and choice of the route.

Since 1992, there have been proposals to extend the Kirkenes–Bjørnevatn Line to either Nikel or Zapolyarny, Russia, where it would connect to the Murmansk–Nikel Line. About 40 kilometers (25 mi) of railway is missing to connect the two lines. The proposal calls to develop Kirkenes as a port for export of Russian products, as the Murmansk port is less suited and under-dimensioned. Major transshipment products include metals from MMC Norilsk Nickel, steel from Arkhangelsk and crude oil. The Murmansk–Nikel Line was built in 1936, is 206 kilometers (128 mi) long, is not electrified and is operated by the Russian Railways. As it is Russian gauge, the Kirkenes–Bjørnevatn Line would be presumably undergo gauge conversion or get dual gauge. A new railway would be able to transport 5 million tonnes of cargo per year.

In 2003, the cost of the necessary 40 kilometers (25 mi) of new railway was estimated at 1.4 billion Norwegian krone (NOK), while the cost of upgrading the existing Russian line was NOK 400 million. In 2007, Murmansk Oblast's governor, Yury Yevdokimov, rejected the plans for a connection to Russia, stating that his opinion was supported by President Vladimir Putin. Because Kirkenes is a better suited port than Murmansk, local authorities in Murmansk do not want to lose transshipment business to Norway. However, with the increased realism of a line to Rovaniemi, which would serve as an alternative route to Kirkenes from Russia, Russian authorities have since 2010 again supported a railway line between Kirkenes and Russia.

A prestudy also exists about the possibility to connect Kirkenes to the Finnish railway network, named the Arctic Railway. Possible routes include from either Rovaniemi, Kolari, Kemijärvi or multiple of these, via Sodankylä, Saariselkä and Ivalo, then either east or west of Lake Inari or via Nikel to Kirkenes. The length of the line would be between 480 and 550 kilometers (300 and 340 mi). The background is the boom of mining in Finnish Lapland and the need for access to a deep, ice-free port. Railway lines exist to the Baltic Sea, but the bay is both shallow and ice-covered during winter. The line would also allow for export of lumber and other products from Finland, while it would provide a route to export fish from Norway to Finland and Eastern Europe. In 2011, the costs of the line were estimated at €1.1 to 1.6 billion. A significantly deviating alternative is to build westwards from Kolari to Skibotn (300 km).
