= Hans Lund-Andersen =

Norwegian mining engineer and businessperson (1921–2014)

Hans Lund-Andersen (3 July 1921 – 9 January 2014) was a Norwegian mining engineer and businessperson.

He was born in Haugesund, and finished his secondary education here in 1941. During the Second World War he participated in resistance work, earning the Defence Medal 1940–1945. He graduated from the Norwegian Institute of Technology in mining engineering in 1947, and in the same year he married Ragna Holter Kongshavn.

He worked for Rødsand Gruber from 1947 to 1951, then for Orkla Gruber from 1951 to 1959. He became chief engineer in Rana Gruber in 1959 and then director of Sydvaranger in 1960. He advanced to chief executive officer in 1970, serving until 1981.

Lund-Andersen was a chairman or board member of the companies Sydvaranger, Store Norske Spitsbergen Kulkompani, Fangelselskapene, Bjørkåsen Gruber, Grong Gruber, Killingdal Gruber, Norsk Bergverk, Grønseth, Aspro, Dyno Industrier, Saga Petroleum, Pelikan, Skogfoss Kraftverk and Vadsø Sildoljefabrikk; as well as the Federation of Norwegian Industries, Industrivernet, the Norwegian Employers' Confederation and the Association of Norwegian Mines.

He was a vice consul for Sweden from 1960, and was decorated as a Knight of the Order of Vasa. Lund-Andersen resided in Ullern after retiring from Sydvaranger, and moved to Haugesund in 2002. He died here in January 2014.
