= Bjørnevatn Station =

Former railway station, located at Bjørnevatn in Sør-Varanger, Norway

Bjørnevatn
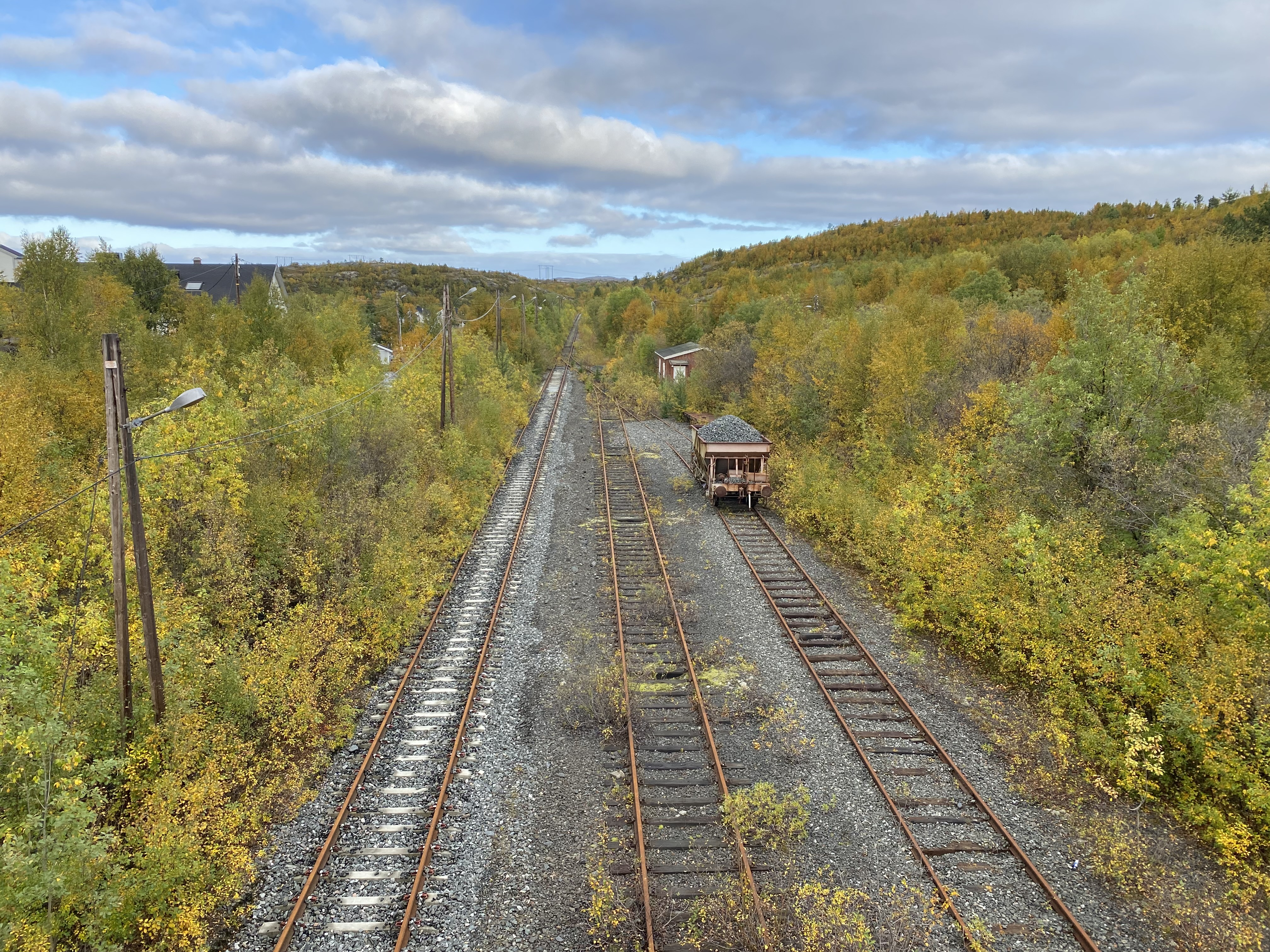

General information
- Location: Bjørnevatn, Sør-Varanger Municipality; Norway
- Coordinates: 69.6683°N 29.9979°E
- Elevation: 77.0 m (252.6 ft)
- Owner: Sydvaranger
- Line: Kirkenes–Bjørnevatn Line
- Distance: 7.5 km (4.7 mi)

History
- Opened: 10 July 1910
Location

Bjørnevatn Station (Norwegian: Bjørnevatn stasjon) is a former railway station, located at Bjørnevatn in Sør-Varanger Municipality in Finnmark county, Norway, that was the terminus of the Kirkenes–Bjørnevatn Line.

Preceding station		Following station
Kirkenes	Kirkenes–Bjørnevatn Line	Terminus
