= V65 =

V65 may refer to:

- DB Class V 65, a locomotive
- Honda V65 Magna, a motorcycle
- Vanadium-65, an isotope of vanadium
- Vought V-65, an American observation biplane
- V^{6}_{5}, the first inversion of the dominant seventh chord
