= Kirkenes Station =

Former railway station in Sør-Varanger, Norway

Kirkenes

General information
- Location: Kirkenes, Sør-Varanger Municipality; Norway
- Coordinates: 69.7220°N 30.0326°E
- Elevation: 59.5 m (195 ft)
- Owner: Sydvaranger
- Line: Kirkenes–Bjørnevatn Line
- Distance: 0.0 km (0 mi)

History
- Opened: 10 July 1910
Location

Kirkenes Station (Norwegian: Kirkenes stasjon) is a former railway station, located at the town of Kirkenes in Sør-Varanger Municipality in Finnmark county, Norway. The station was the terminus of the Kirkenes–Bjørnevatn Line. While the line still exists, it no longer has passenger service, instead serving the transport of iron ore from a nearby mine to the Port of Kirkenes.

Preceding station		Following station
Terminus	Kirkenes–Bjørnevatn Line	Bjørnevatn
