= T45 =

T45, T.45 or T-45 may refer to:

== Vehicles ==
- Cooper T45, a racing car
- McDonnell Douglas T-45 Goshawk, an American trainer aircraft
- SJ T45, a Swedish diesel-electric locomotive
- Slingsby T.45 Swallow, a British glider
- Type 45 destroyer, a destroyer class of the Royal Navy
- T45 Roadtrain, a 1988 Leyland Motors tractor truck

== Other uses ==
- T45 (classification), a disabled sports handicap class for arm amputees
- T.45 (standard), an ITU standard for run-length encoding
