= Melkefoss hydroelectric station =

Coordinates: 69.399075°N 29.787283°E

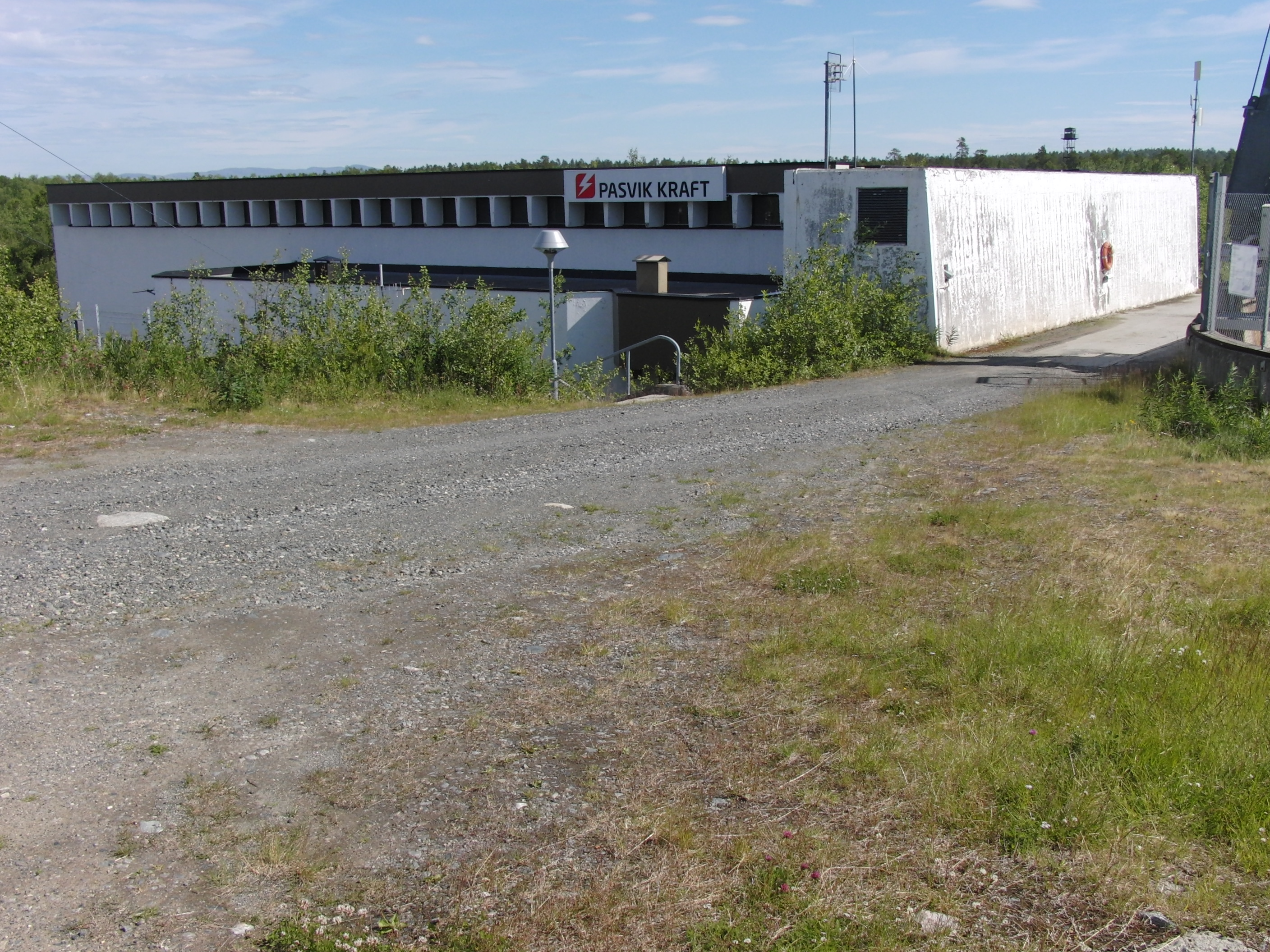
- Official name: Melkefoss Kraftverk
- Location: Sør-Varanger Municipality, Finnmark, Norway
- Opening date: 1978; 47 years ago
- Operator(s): Pasvik Kraft

Dam and spillways
- Impounds: Paatsjoki River

Reservoir
- Total capacity: 2,584,000,000 cubic metres (2,095,000 acre⋅ft)

Melkefoss power station is a hydro electric dam on the Paatsjoki river in the Sør-Varanger Municipality in Finnmark, Norway.

The power station, which is owned by Pasvik Kraft, makes use of a fall of 10 meters (33 ft) in the river. Although the power station is located on a river, Lake Inari is regulated as storage for all of the power stations in the drainage basin. The dam has one installed Kaplan turbine, yielding 26 megawatts (35,000 hp). Mean yearly production at the dam is 129 gigawatt-hours (460 TJ).

== Sources ==
- NVE
- Varanger kraft
