= MaK G 1201 BB =

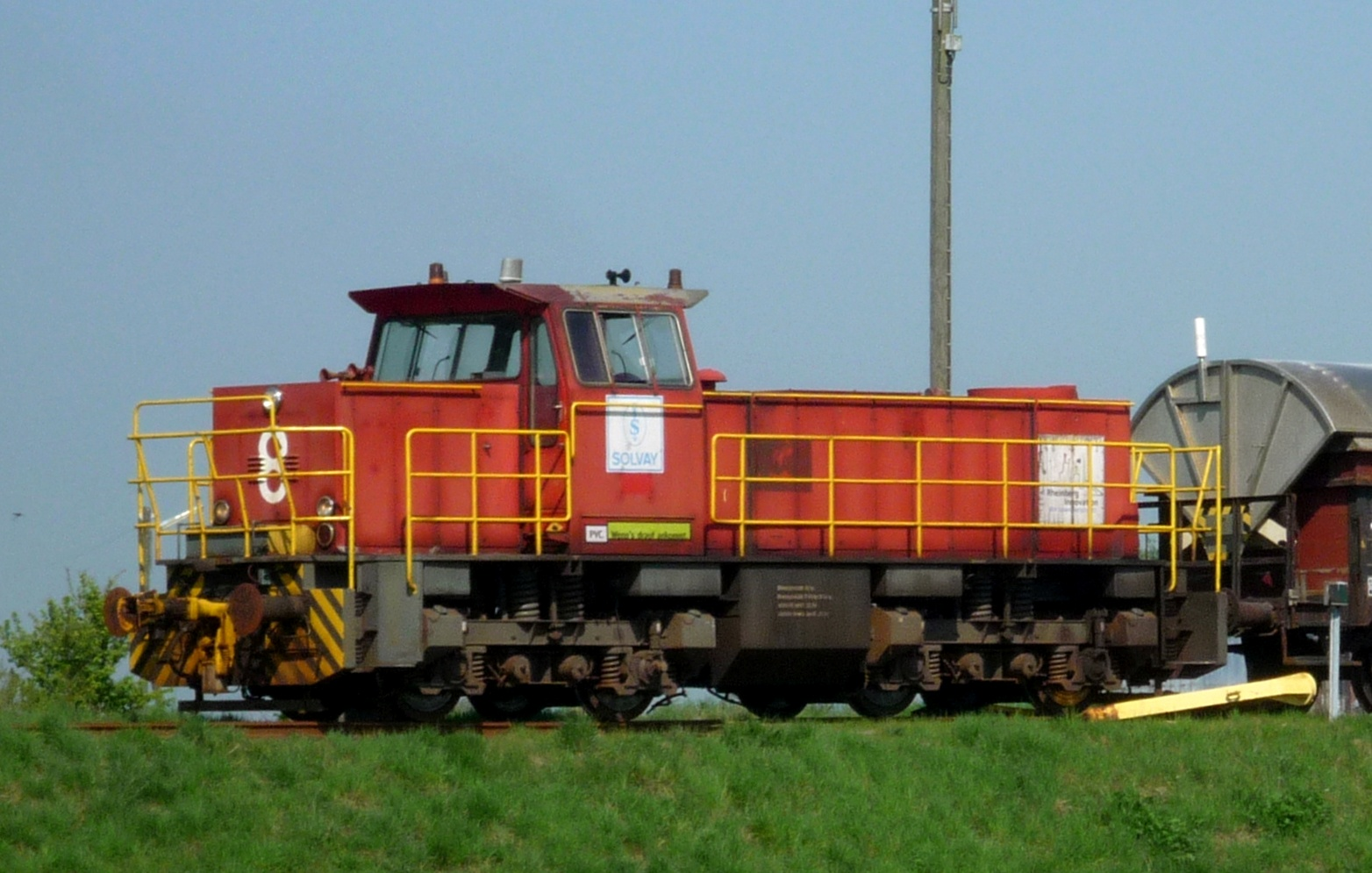
- Solvay MaK G 1201 BB
Type and origin
- Power type: Diesel
- Builder: MaK
- Build date: 1978
- Total produced: 1
Specifications
- Configuration
  - UIC: B'B'
- Gauge: 1,435 mm (4 ft 8 1/2 in)
- Wheel diameter: 1,000 mm (39.37 in) (new)
- Minimum curve: 60 m (196 ft 10 in)
- Wheelbase: bogie centre distance 5.800 m (19 ft 0.3 in) axle distance 2.400 m (7 ft 10.49 in)
- Length: 12.500 m (41 ft 0.1 in)
- Width: 3.100 m (10 ft 2.05 in)
- Height: 4.220 m (13 ft 10.14 in)
- Fuel capacity: 2,500 L (550 imp gal; 660 US gal)
- Prime mover: MTU 8V 396 TC12
- Transmission: Voith L4r4zU2
Performance figures
- Maximum speed: 40 km/h (25 mph)
- Power output: 665 kW (892 hp)

The MaK G 1201 BB is a four axle B'B' diesel-hydraulic off-centre cab locomotive built by the Maschinenbau Kiel in German. The locomotive is designed for shunting and freight work, such as found on industrial railways.

== Description ==
Only one example of this locomotive was built, later orders for a similar purpose were fulfilled by the MaK G 1203 BB which replaced the MTU 331 engine with a MTU 396 engine of increased power.

The locomotive has worked since 1980 at Solvay's plant nr. Rheinberg, Germany.
