= Murmansk–Nikel Railway =

Railway line in Murmansk Oblast, Russia

Overview
- Owner: Russian Railways
- Termini: Murmansk; Nikel
- Stations: 11

Service
- Type: Railway
- System: Russian Railways
- Operator(s): Russian Railways

History
- Opened: 1936

Technical
- Line length: 206 km
- Character: Freight
- Track gauge: 1,520 mm (4 ft 11 27/32 in) Russian gauge
- Electrification: No
- Operating speed: 40 km/h

The Murmansk–Nikel Railway is a 206 km long railway between Murmansk and Nikel in Murmansk Oblast, Russia, primarily for freight from the nickel mine at Nikel, with the passenger service east of Kola currently suspended. The railway was completed in 1968 and is not electrified. A part was built 1936. In 1961 the line Kola - Pechenga was opened and in 1968 to Nikel.

== Proposed expansion ==
The Norwegian Kirkenes World Port Group consortium has proposed connecting the Kirkenes–Bjørnevatn Line mining railway to the Murmansk–Nikel Railway at Zapolyarny, linking the Russian rail network to the Norwegian port of Kirkenes, to reduce port congestion at Murmansk. So far the Russians prefer using their own port, which has also been expanded.
