= MaK G 1203 BB =

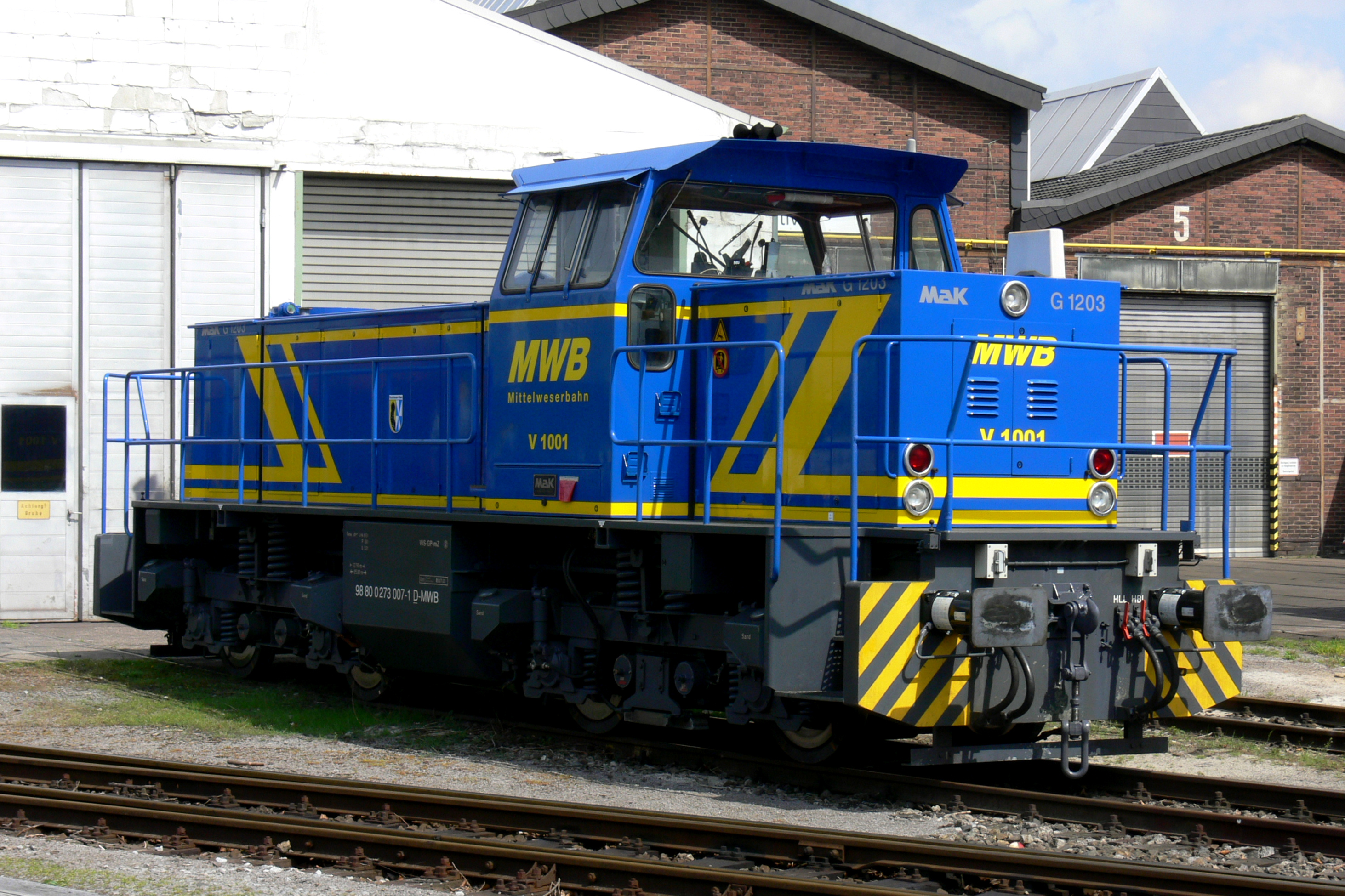
- Mittelweserbahn (MWB) G 1203 BB
Type and origin
- Power type: Diesel
- Builder: Maschinenbau Kiel
- Build date: 1982–1991
- Total produced: 25
Specifications
- Configuration
  - UIC: B'B'
- Gauge: 1,435 mm (4 ft 8 1/2 in)
- Wheel diameter: 1,000 mm (39.37 in) (new)
- Minimum curve: 60 m (197 ft)
- Wheelbase: bogie centre distance 5.800 m (19 ft 0.3 in) axle distance 2.400 m (94.49 in)
- Length: 12.500 m (41 ft 0.1 in)
- Width: 3.100 m (10 ft 2.05 in)
- Height: 4.220 m (13 ft 10.14 in)
- Fuel capacity: 2,500 L (550 imp gal; 660 US gal)
- Prime mover: MTU 8V 396 TC13 : 745 kW (999 hp); Cummins engine : 761 kW (1,021 hp)*
- Transmission: Voith L4r4zU2
Performance figures
- Maximum speed: 33–70 km/h (21–43 mph)
- For export to Gabon

The MaK G 1203 BB is a type of four axle B'B' off-centre cab locomotive built by Maschinenbau Kiel.

== Design and operations ==
The locomotive is an updated version of the MaK G 1201 BB with a MTU 396 engine replacing the MTU 333 engine. The hydrodynamic converter remained the same, a Voith L4r4zU2.

The locomotive design is similar to the MaK G 1202 BB and MaK G 1204 BB but with an eight-cylinder V engine instead of the twelve-cylinder engines on the higher-powered locomotives; the external dimensions of are identical, and the appearance very similar.

Nineteen locomotives were built for private railways of Germany (and Austria), including Seehafen Kiel (Port of Kiel), and the Klockner steel works (now ArcelorMittal Bremen).

=== Gabon locomotives ===
Six locomotives were built in 1984 for the railways of Gabon (Office du chemin de fer transgabonais) or OCTRA, with Cummins engines instead of MTU engines. They received numbers "BB 531" to "BB 536"
