= DB Class V 65 =

DB V 65 / 265
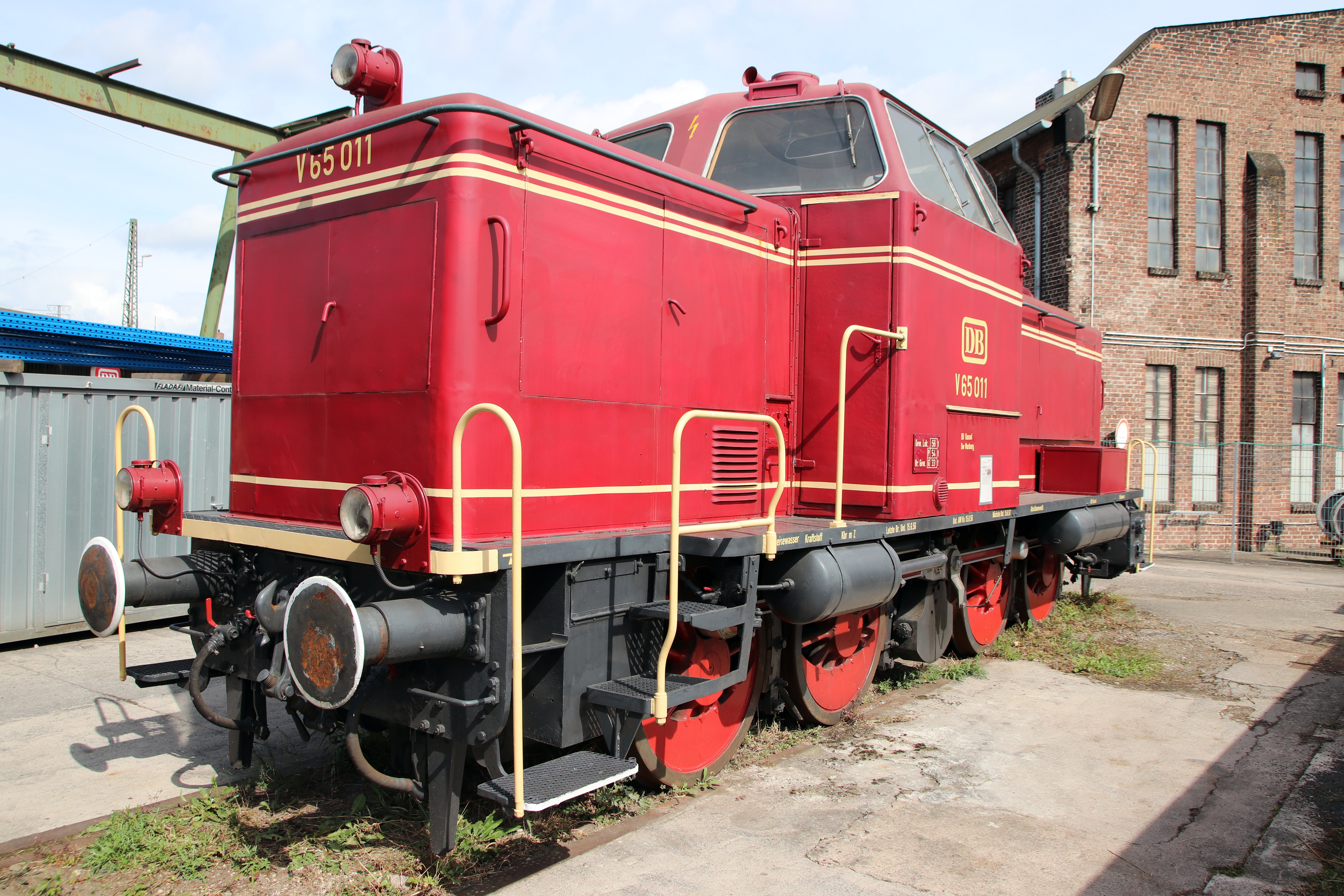
Type and origin
- Power type: Diesel-hydraulic
- Builder: Maschinenbau Kiel
- Serial number: 600004–600018
- Model: MaK 600D
- Build date: 1956
- Total produced: 15
Specifications
- Configuration
  - Whyte: 0-8-0DH
  - UIC: D
- Gauge: 1,435 mm (4 ft 8 1/2 in)
- Wheel diameter: 1,250 mm (4 ft 1 1/4 in)
- Wheelbase: 5,800 mm (19 ft 3/8 in)
- Length
  - Over buffers: 10,740 mm (35 ft 2 7/8 in)
- Axle load: 13.5 t (13.3 long tons; 14.9 short tons)
- Service weight: 54.0 t (53.1 long tons; 59.5 short tons)
- Prime mover: MaK MS 301 C
- RPM
  - Maximum RPM: 750 rpm
- Engine type: 6-cylinder diesel engine
Performance figures
- Maximum speed: 80 km/h (50 mph)
- Power output: 552 kW (751 PS; 740 hp)
Career
- Operators: Deutsche Bundesbahn
- Class: V 65, 265 from 1968
- Numbers: DB V 65 001–015
- Retired: 1980

The DB Class V 65 locomotives (from 1968: Class 265) were German, eight-wheeled, rod-coupled diesel locomotives operated by Deutsche Bundesbahn (DB) intended for light railway services and medium-heavy shunting duties. The 15 locomotives were delivered in 1956 by MaK (Kiel) to the DB.

== Description ==
Class V 65/Class 265 engines were delivered to the DB shortly after the arrival in service of the first V 60s. Amongst their special features were the MaK motor with only 750 rpm and the Beugniot lever between the individual axles, that improved curve running. For train heating the engine had a boiler that was heated by the engine's exhaust gases. The engine itself had to be pre-heated with a Dofa coke oven. For this purpose up to 100 kg of coke could be carried.

Although, with only 15 units, the Class V 65 was built in relatively small numbers, it was really only a slight modification of the 600 D built by MaK for private railways. These belonged to the so-called MaK rod-coupled locomotives, that were operated in large numbers by private railways. Their power ranged between 240 and 1,200 PS (180 and 880 kW).

== Operations ==
The locomotives were initially deployed in the area of Marburg/Lahn ahead of light passenger trains, but in 1964 they were replaced by the more powerful V 100. After that, five examples were used for shunting duties at Puttgarden ferryboat station until 1980, being stationed at the depot (Bahnbetriebswerk) at Puttgarden. The remainder were employed at Hamburg-Altona where their duties included working on the Hamburg Harbour railway.

Locomotive V 65 001 has been preserved and, after a term with the Meppen-Haselünne Railway is now looked after by the Osnabrück Steam Railway Society (Osnabrücker Dampflokfreunden) and is used as a museum railway engine. Another V65, number V 65 011, has been loaned by the DB Museum to the Bochum-Dahlhausen Railway Museum owned by the DGEG.

== Appearance in film ==
In the first scenes of the 1962 film Die Tür mit den sieben Schlössern (The Door with the Seven Locks) a pair of DB V 65 engines (V65 005 and 007) can clearly be seen standing in the station. This reveals that the scenes were filmed in a German station and not - as the film tries to suggest by the use of various English signs - at a station in London.

== See also ==
- List of DB locomotives and railbuses
