= Varanger Kraft =

Norwegian power company

Varanger Kraft AS
- Type: Municipal owned
- Industry: Power
- Founded: 1938
- Headquarters: Vadsø, Norway
- Area served: Eastern Finnmark
- Key people: Åge Andresen (CEO); Terje Kofoed (Chairman)
- Revenue: ▲NOK 314 million (2006)
- Operating income: NOK 109 million (2006)
- Net income: NOK 101 million (2006)
- Number of employees: 107 (2007)
- Website: www.varangerkraft.no

Varanger Kraft is a municipally owned power company that operates four hydroelectric power stations producing 420 GWh per year through the subsidiary Pasvik Kraft, operates the power grid in the seven owner municipalities in Eastern Finnmark with 3,200 kilometres (2,000 mi) of power lines and 16,000 customers, and retails power through Barents Energi. Its head offices are located in Vadsø.

The company is owned by Sør-Varanger Municipality (31.25%), Vadsø Municipality (21.88%), Tana Municipality (12.50%), Vardø Municipality (12.5%), Båtsfjord Municipality (9.38%), Berlevåg Municipality (6.25%) and Nesseby Municipality (6.25%). It operates the power grid in the same municipalities. The four power stations are Gandvik, Melkefoss, Skogfoss, and Kongsfjord.

== History ==
The company dates back to 1938. It was made a limited company in 1994, and in 2000 it bought the defunct mining company Sydvaranger, that it later sold to Tschudi Group. In 2003 the company was transformed to a corporate model.
