= Skogfoss hydroelectric station =

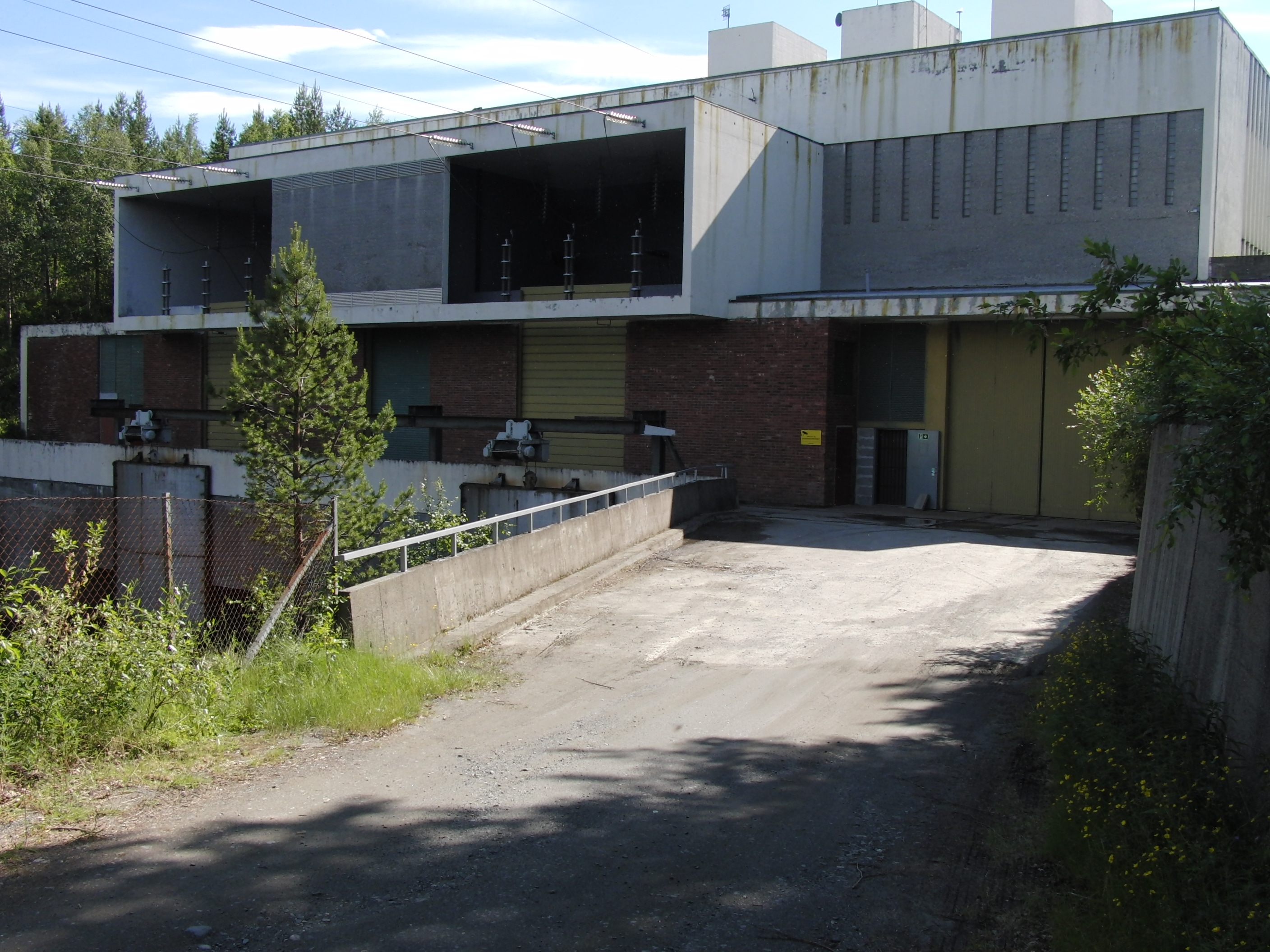
- Official name: Skogfoss Kraftverk
- Location: Skogfoss in Sør-Varanger, Finnmark, Norway
- Coordinates: 69.375113°N 29.699135°E
- Opening date: 1964; 61 years ago
- Operator(s): Pasvik Kraft

Dam and spillways
- Impounds: Paatsjoki River

Reservoir
- Total capacity: 2,584,000,000 m^{3} (2,095,000 acre⋅ft)

Skogfoss power station is a hydro electric dam in Finnmark, Norway.

The power station is situated in Sør-Varanger Municipality near the village of Skogfoss on the river Paatsjoki (Pasvikelva). The power station, which is owned by Pasvik Kraft, a subsidiary of Varanger Kraft, makes use of a 20-metre (66 ft) fall in the river. Although the power station is located on a river, Lake Inari in Finland is regulated as storage for all of the power stations in the drainage basin. The river is dammed at the power station, which also has a small reservoir in Langvannet. Following the damming, the water level rose to a level of 9 metres and many cabins had to be vacated. A Sami grave site also had to be moved following the regulation.

Parts of the dam pass over the Russian border. There are roads to the road network of both countries, but the border crossing is not open to public. There is only one road on the Norwegian side from the Pasvik valley to the outside world, meaning visitors have to drive the same way back. There are wishes from local people to build a road to Finland, so that tourists can pass through the valley. Such plans have been rejected due to cost reasons. It would be possible to use the road over the Skogfoss station or the one over the Hevoskoski/Hestefoss station upstream and the existing Russian road to the Finnish border. But this has not been politically possible.

There are two installed Kaplan turbines producing a total of 60 megawatts (80,000 hp). The mean yearly production of the dam is 358 gigawatt-hours (1,290 TJ)
