= Sydvaranger =

Iron ore mining company operating in Sør-Varanger, Norway

- Industry: Mining
- Founded: 12 January 1906; 120 years ago
- Headquarters: Kirkenes, Norway
- Area served: Sør-Varanger Municipality
- Products: Iron ore
- Parent: Grangex (2024–present)
- Website: www.sydvaranger.com

Sydvaranger AS (previously A/S Sydvaranger) is an iron ore mining company in Sør-Varanger Municipality, Norway. The mining operations have not restarted (as of Q1 2025). With an open-pit mine in Bjørnevatn, it has traditionally hauled the ore with the Kirkenes–Bjørnevatn Line to Kirkenes for processing and shipping.

The ore was discovered in 1866, but it was not until the 1900s that new technology made it commercially viable. Sydvaranger was established in 1906 by Christian Anker and Nils Persson and had Sweden's Metallurgiska as the majority owner. Production started in 1910 and capacity was increased in 1913.

Production halted during World War I and the company could not recover afterwards, resulting in it falling under bankruptcy protection between 1924 and 1927. During the 1930s the company also owned Rana Mine at Storforshei in Rana Municipality. During the German withdrawal in October 1944 Kirkenes was scorched, including most of the mining infrastructure.

Reconstruction started in 1945, operation commenced in 1953 and the facilities were completed in 1960. At its peak, the company had 1,500 employees. Production was profitable from the reopening until 1976, but from then the company needed NOK 5 billion in state grants to keep running, before being shut down in 1996.

After returning to operations between 2009 and 2015, it was expected that mining activities would resume in 2022, two years after the company and property were purchased by Tacora resources. On May 6, 2024, it was announced that Grangex had completed the acquisition of Sydvaranger Mining AS.

== History ==
=== Establishment ===
The iron ore at Bjørnevatn was originally discovered by assistant director of the Geological Survey of Norway, Tellef Dahll, in 1868. It was at the time not commercially viable to mine. With the development of magnetic separation, merchant Christian Anker from Halden started acquiring deeds for the area. In 1903, he contacted the government and started negotiating an agreement to start operations. After several rounds of proposals he received permission and the contract was signed on 9 March 1905. Anker's principal assistant, Engineer Henrik Lund, arrived at Kirkenes in 1903 and started designing the plant. He was assisted by Hans Johan Bernhard Hansen from 1905. They decided that the port should be located at Kirkenes and that a railway would have to be built between the mine and the port.

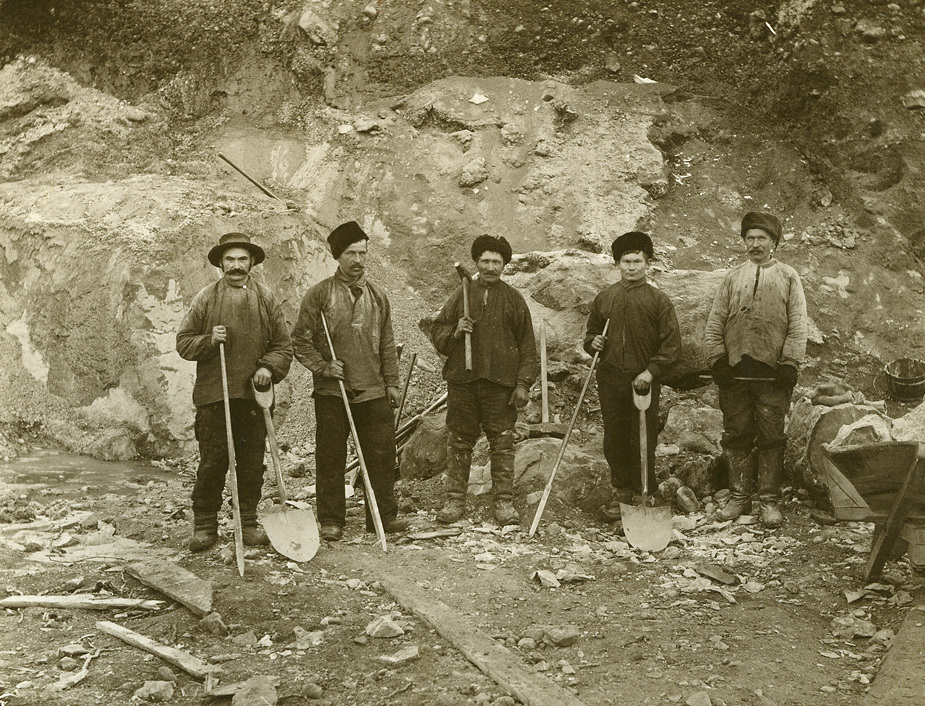
Workers in 1907

By 1905, then Anker had negotiated an investment agreement with Nils Persson of Sweden, who took over Anker's rights immediately after Anker had signed the contract. The company was established on 12 January 1906 with A. P. Pehrson appointed the company's first managing director. The share capital was set to 5 million Norwegian krone (NOK) and the majority shareholder was Metallurgiska. The first task was to mine a trial 100 tonnes (98 long tons; 110 short tons), which were shipped to Luleå for analysis. Inge Thoresen Wiull was hired as chief engineer in September 1906. He initially started working on housing in Kirkenes, which by 1908 had reached 31 houses for workers, each with four apartments, and six white-collar houses. From November 1906 Wiull was also responsible for constructing the railway and the port, based on his experience from managing the construction of the Valdres Line.

Investments were in 1907 estimated to NOK 12 million, of which NOK 4.3 was for transport investments, NOK 4.5 million for the separation and briquetting plants, and NOK 1.5 million for investments in the mine. Capital was borrowed from a consortium consisting of Norddeutsche Bank, Disconto-Gesellschaft, Centralbanken for Norge and Stockholms Enskilda Bank. In addition the share capital was increased to NOK 10 million at the shareholders meeting in October 1907. A. Herden was hired by Metallurgiska to construct the separation plant and briquetting, which was dimensioned to for an annual export of 600,000 tonnes (590,000 long tons; 660,000 short tons). This was later reduced to an export capacity of 330,000 tonnes (320,000 long tons; 360,000 short tons). Pehrson resigned from 1 July 1908 and was replaced by Carl Lundh. To ensure all-year access to the port, the company ordered the 250-kilowatt (350 hp) icebreaker SS Sydvaranger, which was delivered in 1907 and operated by the subsidiary Dampskib Aktieselskabet Pasvik. The subsidiary ordered a second icebreaker, the 450-kilowatt (600 hp) SS Pasvik in 1908.

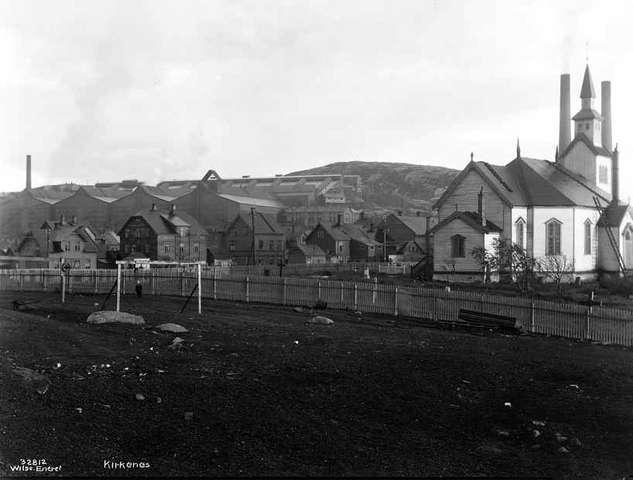
Kirkenes in 1928

Most of Sydvaranger's original workforce came from Troms and Nordland, most of which were construction workers. Finnmark was experiencing a decline in fishing and some of the workforce came from nearby. The first trade union, Nordens Klippe, was established on 8 September 1906. Gradually separate trade unions for each profession were established. The first strike took place in 1908, but did not last long. Nils Albin Hedman was the first person to be killed in a working accident. The closest hospital was in Vadsø, but this raised the need for a hospital in Kirkenes. As there already were three public hospitals in Finnmark, the company was required to build a private hospital for its workers—non-employees had to travel to Vadsø or Vardø.

Construction of the railway was given high priority to as early as possible aid in transport of workers to the mining sites. Both stations were completed in 1908, the same year as the laying of tracks started. The first steam locomotive, built at Hamar Jernstøperi, was delivered during the fall of 1908. For the tracks in the mine, a shunter was needed and the company bought a fireless locomotive. Tracks were laid through the open-pit mine, with the length varying. For instance, in 1910 there were 5 kilometers (3 mi) of tracks in the mine. Construction of a railway electrification system started in 1910; because an overhead wire could interfere with the cranes, third-rail conduction was chosen. The electric components were delivered by Siemens-Schukert and were taken into use in 1912. The company took delivery of two electric locomotives.

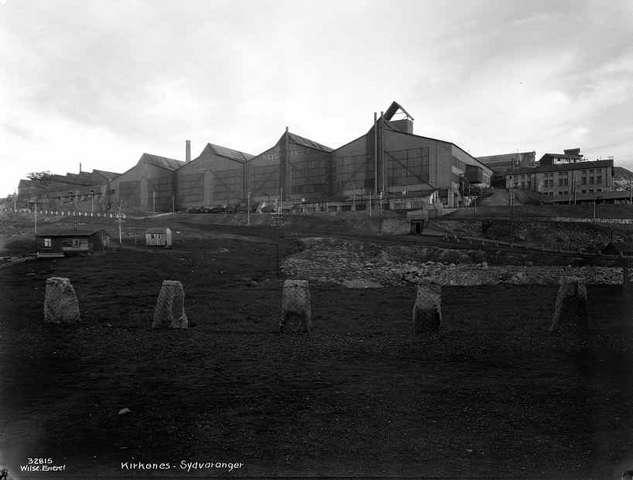

Vulkan and four German construction companies issued tenders for construction of the separation and briquette plants; as Vulkan offered the second-cheapest bid it was selected. Installations started in July 1909, but work progressed slowly, in part because of the slow progress of the foundation work. This was partially accelerated with workforce from Christiania (Oslo), but they were again hindered because local lumber could not be used for the scaffolding. There was not sand of the necessary quality for concrete in the immediate area, so an aerial tramway was constructed from Bjørnevatn to Sandneselva.

Vulkan also built workshops and installed transformers. The company took delivery of a gyratory crusher in December 1909, which was also installed by Vulkan. The main axle broke during the trials, but it was repaired in time for the opening on 1 October 1910. Sydvaranger initially applied to build a hydroelectric power station in Pasvikelva, but instead had to build a 9-megawatt (12,000 hp) thermal power station in Kirkenes. It was expanded to 16 megawatts (21,000 hp) in 1917. Construction of the port with the separation and briquetting plants, known as the export facilities, started in 1907. Several quays were built, including one for export of ore and one for import of coal.

=== Pre-war operations ===
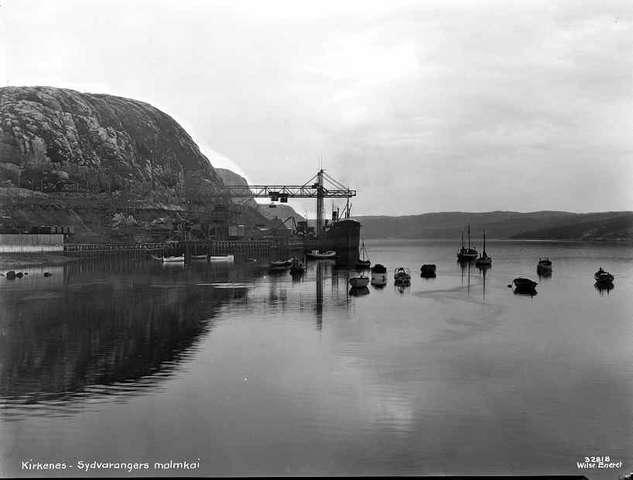
The ore-exporting docks in 1928

The first revenue train load was transported on 13 July 1910. The first shipload of ore was 2,000 tonnes (2,000 long tons; 2,200 short tons) sent in October 1910 with SS Bengal. The ship sank with no survivors. The cause was probably that the forty-year-old ship had insufficient bulkheads. The second ship, SS Svend, sank off Valdersund. The third vessel, SS Aguilla, was loaded with 3,100 tonnes (3,100 long tons; 3,400 short tons), suffered heeling, but was able to return to Kirkenes. Wiull was hired as director of operations in 1910, and the following year Fr. H. Behrens was appointed managing director. Good market conditions resulted in the company deciding in 1911 to increase the facilities capacity to 500,000 tonnes (490,000 long tons; 550,000 short tons) per year, costing NOK 3 million. This involved installing a new crusher, ordering two new locomotives and three new steam shovels and an expansion of the briquette and separation plant. The expansion was completed in 1911.

From 1911, the government required the company to establish a fund which would aid the workers should the company go bankrupt. This was introduced after several large industrial companies had collapsed in the past decade and large costs had befallen the state. Just as the first expansion was completed, Sydvaranger decided that it needed to further expand its export capacity to 650,000 tonnes (640,000 long tons; 720,000 short tons). Financing was secured through issuing new shares worth NOK 3 million. Investments included a new steam shovel, three steam cranes, three locomotives, a new briquetting plant; the work was completed in 1913. In 1913 the company had 1,150 employees.

With the break-out of World War I all of Sydvarangers sales and shipping contracts were annulled for the duration of the conflict. In July 1914 the company started securing sufficient spare parts and increasing its purchases of coal and food. As it was difficult to sell ore, the workforce was instead put to preparatory work, such as preparing new areas for mining, emptying one pit of water and lowering the water level in Bjørnevatnet by three meters (10 ft). In addition the company built up a surplus of ore. Henrik Lund took a study trip to the United States in 1916, where he visited more than twenty cities and brought a series of innovations with him back. Wiull quit in 1917 and was replaced by Johan Knudtzen.

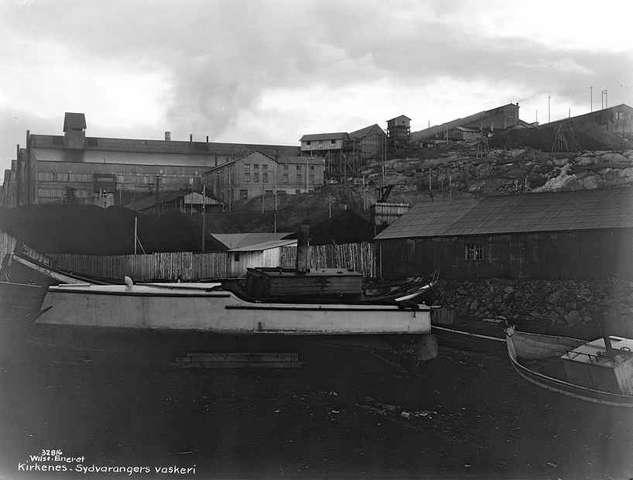

In the aftermath of World War I, Norway was not permitted to export more than 133,624 tonnes (131,514 long tons; 147,295 short tons) of iron ore to Germany per year, of which Sydvaranger was issued a quota of 65,000. None of the Allies were interested in importing from Sydvaranger. The rise of coal prices caused the company to again look into hydroelectricity, and the subsidiary Tårnelven Kraftselskap was given concession to build a power station in Tårnelven on 15 July 1919. This was based on moving the flow of Kobbholmvassdraget and Karpelven to Tårnelven to power a common station, but this proved impossible to accomplish. Instead the lakes of Viksjøen, Djupvann and Storvand were regulated and a common power station built at sea level. A 19.3-kilometer (12.0 mi) long transmission line was built to Bjørnevatn. This allowed the mainline railway between Kirkenes and Bjørnevatn to be electrified in 1920.

By 1919 the company was still not back in production. SS Sydvaranger and several locomotives were sold to raise capital, and the share capital was depreciated by fifty percent to NOK 11.5 million, new shares were sold for this amount and bonds were issued for NOK 10 million. This was not sufficient to save the company's finances, and after negotiations with the creditors, Sydvaranger amortized its shares to NOK 3.45 million and sold new shares worth NOK 21.55 million. The company introduced a new production method using sintering, but returned to briquettes from 1926. The company was struck by a major strike in 1921, which stopped part of the production. By the following year the surplus of export products was down to the pre-war levels and the company had 896 employees. The company also started a policy to lend money to employees to allow them to build their own houses.

Sydvaranger entered negotiations with their creditors on 5 August 1925. It was found that the company was well-run, but that the poor results were due to the market conditions. On 13 November the company filed for bankruptcy, but the company was allowed to continue with production using 200 staff. The company was refinanced and left bankruptcy protection on 17 August 1927. At the same time a new agreement with the state was signed, which insured that only Norwegian citizens were permitted to work for the company, and that the mining rights would escheat to the state after 99 years. The new shareholders issued NOK 700,000 for a number of welfare investments in Kirkenes, such as a library and sports facilities. Lundh retired as chairman in 1927.

To reduce the conflicts between the company and employees, Sydvaranger started using single-person contracts. These offered higher wages and more welfare advantages, such as paid sick leave, than the collective bargaining agreements, and were used by the company to reduce the trade unions' influence in an attempt to reduce strikes. However, the move resulted in trade unions striking between 12 May 1928 and 13 April 1929, without them succeeding in reducing the output. The conflict resulting in intra-worker conflicts between the strikers and non-unionized. In 1928 Sydvaranger exported 500,000 tonnes (490,000 long tons; 550,000 short tons) and Tårnelven Kraftaksjeselskap started construction of a power station in Kobbholmvassdraget. Completed in 1930, it gave an annual production of 7.2 gigawatt-hours. The power company changed its name to Sydvaranger Kraftaksjeselskap in 1934.

The company was hit by the Great Depression as ore prices fell in 1930. Production was reduced by reducing the work to a four-day week, which continued for seven months. Although ore prices varied, the company had made a profit throughout the 1930s. Knudtzen retired as chief of operations in 1935 and was replaced by Hans Torgersrud. The following year Sydvaranger bought forty percent of the shipping company Malmfart, which signed a ten-year contract to ship ore. The company's first ship was the 1919 SS Varangmalm. Malmfart later bought SS Varangberg, and both ships were sunk in 1939. Work with establishing mining at Grunntjern and Søstervann started in 1937. From 1938 mining started at Kjellmannsåsen, where there sufficient concentration to allow it to be direct shipping ore. This was the first time trucks were used for transport. The company exported 900,000 tonnes (890,000 long tons; 990,000 short tons) in 1938. From 1939 production was more difficult and was periodically stopped. However, an agreement was signed on 11 July 1939 to establish Harefossen Kraftselskap which would build a power station at Harefossen in Passvikelva.

=== World War II and reconstruction ===
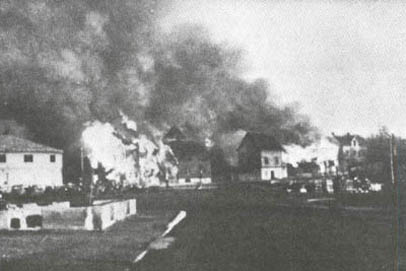
The burning of Kirkenes by the Wehrmacht in October 1944

After the occupation of Norway by Nazi Germany, mining continued under German administration until January 1942. As part of Operation Nordlicht in October 1944, Kirkenes was scorched, causing extensive damage to the mining company's infrastructure. Most of the facilities were bombed, and what was not bombed was burnt or blasted. A notable exception was the two power stations, which the Germans did not have time to scorch. Sydvaranger was hindered from starting its reconstruction until the damages had been priced, which was completed in September 1945.

Sydvaranger's board initially recommended that the company be liquidated, but reversed their opinion after discovering that the war insurance would only be paid if the facilities were reconstructed. This was later set to NOK 27.5 million. Reconstruction started in September 1945 after the Red Army had withdrawn from Sør-Varanger. The Directorate for Enemy Property took over ownership which was previously owned by German interests, giving the state a 43.6 percent ownership of Sydvaranger. By the end of 1945, 390 people were employed in the company. Payments from the war insurance were terminated in October 1946, after payments of NOK 4.3 million, as only companies entirely owned and managed by Norwegian citizens could receive compensation. As an interim solution, the financing was secured through a loan of NOK 10 million from the Ministry of Trade and Industry.

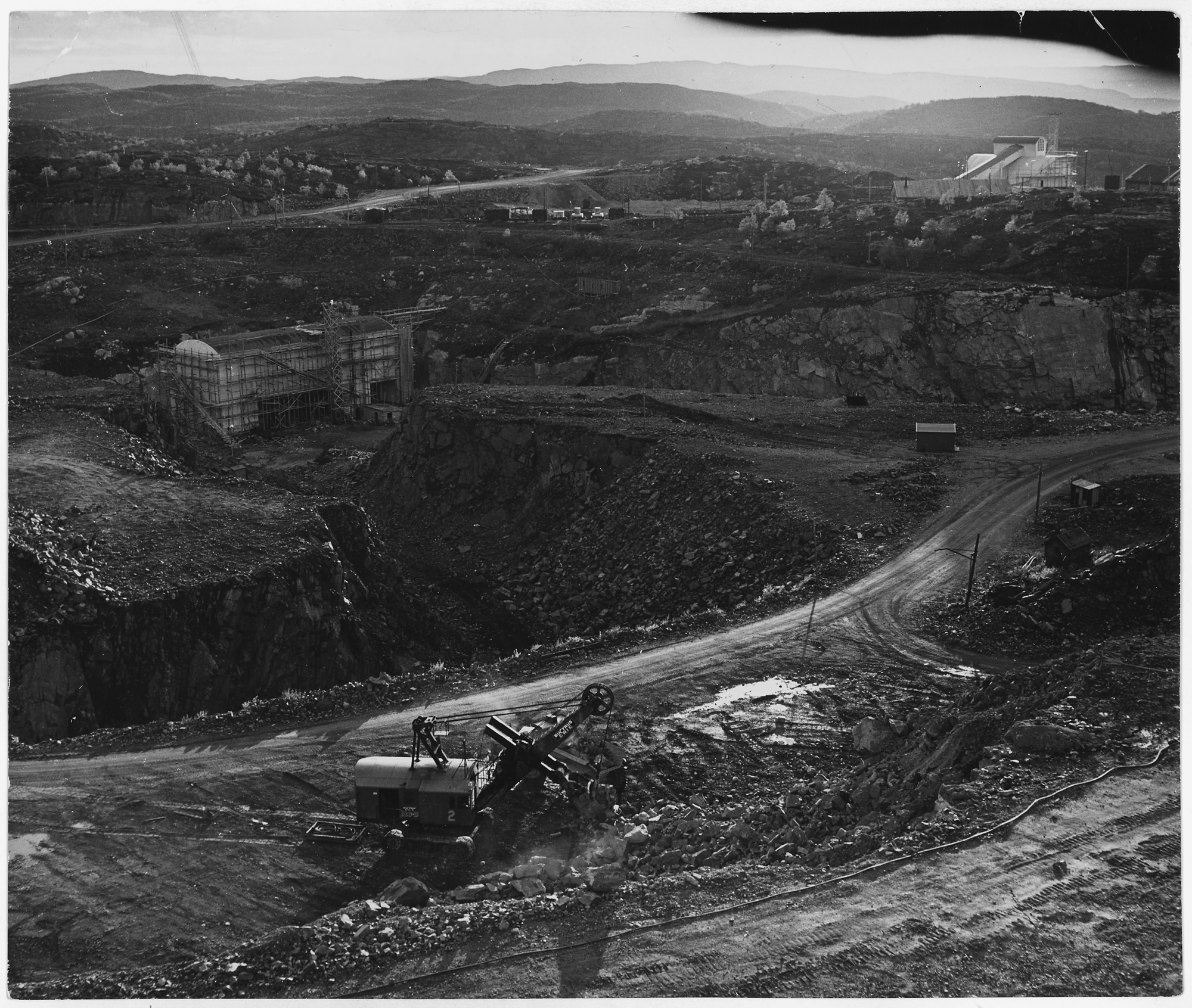
Reconstruction of the mine sometime between 1948 and 1955

Guttorm Brukeland was contracted as the main architect for the industrial facilities. From 1945, passenger trains ran between the two settlements, at first with steam locomotives. Reconstruction started with private dwellings and a workshop at Kirkenes, with 73 apartments completed by 1947. Sydvaranger considered changing its mining methods, but new technology resulted in the company continuing with open-pit excavation. Detailed plans for the facilities was issued to the ministry on 16 May 1947. The main change of operations was introduction of pelletizing. A public inquiry of the possibilities was carried out through 1947 and concluded that the company would need NOK 124 million in capital, including NOK 22 million to cover running costs. The company was only able to raise NOK 34.5 million, including the war insurance. The committee proposed that the investments be financed through the state buying new shares for NOK 10 million and issuing NOK 80 million in loans. Their calculations showed an annual deficit of NOK 3.6 million, but the committee regarded it of vital importance for the local community that production be taken up.

Sydvaranger's management agreed with the committees analysis of operations, but disagreed regarding the financing. Thus the state and the company started negotiations, including a proposal that the state buy all the private shares of the company. Thus the loans were increased with NOK 11.7 million, while the new share capital was halved. This gave the state a 62.4 percent ownership. By 1948 prices had increased with 100 percent over the 1939, compared to the 18 percent estimated by the committee, which would mean that the plant would run with a profit. Parliament passed the financing on 8 October 1948.

The mining company held an option to purchase a majority stake in Malmfrakt, which they executed to increase their ownership to 96 percent. The shipping company's head office was moved to Kirkenes in 1952. The icebreaker, owned by Dampskipselskapet Pasvik, had been sunk during the war, so a new icebreaker was delivered in 1947, MS Varangis. All heavy transport during the reconstruction was done using railway, and tracks were laid throughout the mining facility. The contracts to build new facilities was awarded to Trondhjem Cementstøberi og Entreprenørforretning. Mining equipment was delivered in 1949 and procured through the Marshall Plan. By 1950 there were 700 employees, in addition to 150 construction workers working for subcontractors. From operations started, transport within the mine was performed using trackless machinery. Production resumed in 1953.

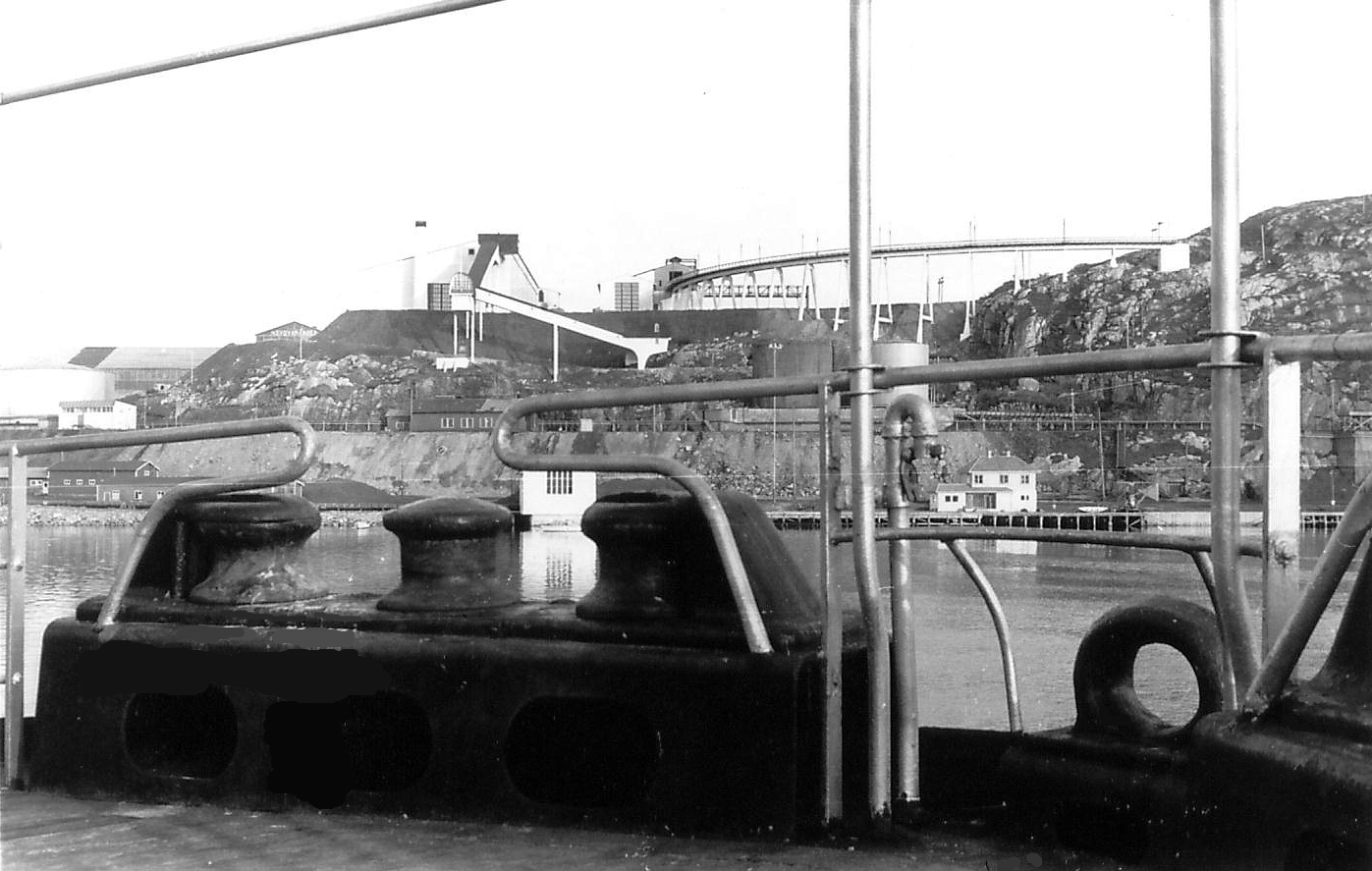
The ore-loading facility at Kirkenes in 1957

Malmfrakt signed a cooperation with Fearnley og Eger's Befragtningsforretning regarding a joint venture, named IS Varangskip. This resulted in the 7,880 tonne MS Varangmalm being delivered in 1939 and followed up with the 5,500 tonne SS Varangberg. Two G12 diesel-electric locomotives were delivered by General Motors Electro-Motive Division in 1954 and 1956. In addition, new hopper wagons were built by Skabo. In 1956 Sydvaranger exported 1.1 million tonnes of ore which was exported to eight countries, including two Norwegian companies. This gave a revenue of NOK 90.3 million. A new loading facility opened at Bjørnevatn in 1957.

To access new areas of the mine, a 2,685 meters (8,809 ft) tunnel was built from the deepest point of Bjørnevatnet, allowing it to be drained. Construction took four years and was completed in 1957. By 1960 Sydvaranger was the sole owner of Malmfart and issued new share capital of NOK 4.75 million to purchase a new, 7,200-tonne ship, co-owned with Fearnley og Eger's. Both Varangmalm and Varangberg were sold in 1960, after the former had run aground. Torgersrud retired as chief of operations in 1960 and was replaced by Hans Lund Andersen.

=== Good times ===
In 1960 the company exported 904,000 tonnes worth NOK 60.8 million and generated a profit of NOK 24.7 million. By 1962 Malmfart had three vessels, of which two were ore-bulk-oil carrier, which allowed them to transport petroleum on the return voyage to Norway. Up to 1963 the mining had taken place at the Østmalmen field, but from then production shifted to Vestmalmen. The first IT system, a punch card machine delivered by IBM, was introduced in 1963. A new icebreaker, Varangis II, was delivered the following year, replacing the old icebreaker. The separate company for operating the icebreakers as liquidated in 1964. The docks were expanded several times, allowing 17,000-tonne ships from 1959, 27,000-tonne ships from 1963 and 37,000-tonne ships from 1966.

Norway and the Soviet Union came to an agreement in 1957 regarding building hydroelectric power stations along Pasvikelva, which ran along the Norway–Soviet Union border. Norway was permitted to build stations at Skoltefoss and Hestefoss, while the Soviet Union was allowed to build at Skoltefoss and Hestefoss, collectively known as the Paatsjoki River Hydroelectric Plants. The agreement insured that each country was permitted to use land in the other country to build the dams. Sydvaranger created the joint venture Sameied Skogfoss Kraftverk along with Varanger Kraftlag til build Skogfoss Power Station. Sydvaranger's half of the investment costs were NOK 44 million. Construction started in 1962 and was completed two years later. The power station had a power output of 240 gigawatt-hours per year, half of which was at the disposal of Sydvaranger. Sydvaranger was free to sell surplus power to the grid. At the same time the mining company sold its power grid in Kirkenes to Varanger Kraftlag.

Since 1956 the company had been working on plans to switch to sub-surface shaft mining. By 1964 new technology meant that it would be possible to continue the surface mining to lower levels, although trials with shaft mining received the go-ahead. A trial shaft was completed to −65 meters (−213 ft) by 1965 and to −242 meters (−794 ft) two years later. No sub-surface revenue mining has ever taken place. Eight new 65-tonne ore trucks from Haulpack were delivered in April 1965, along with two dragline excavators and five bores, costing a total of NOK 38 million. The company continued to purchase more and larger trucks, including eighteen 100-tonne trucks from Lectra Haul between 1968 and 1973, and nine 150-tonne trucks.

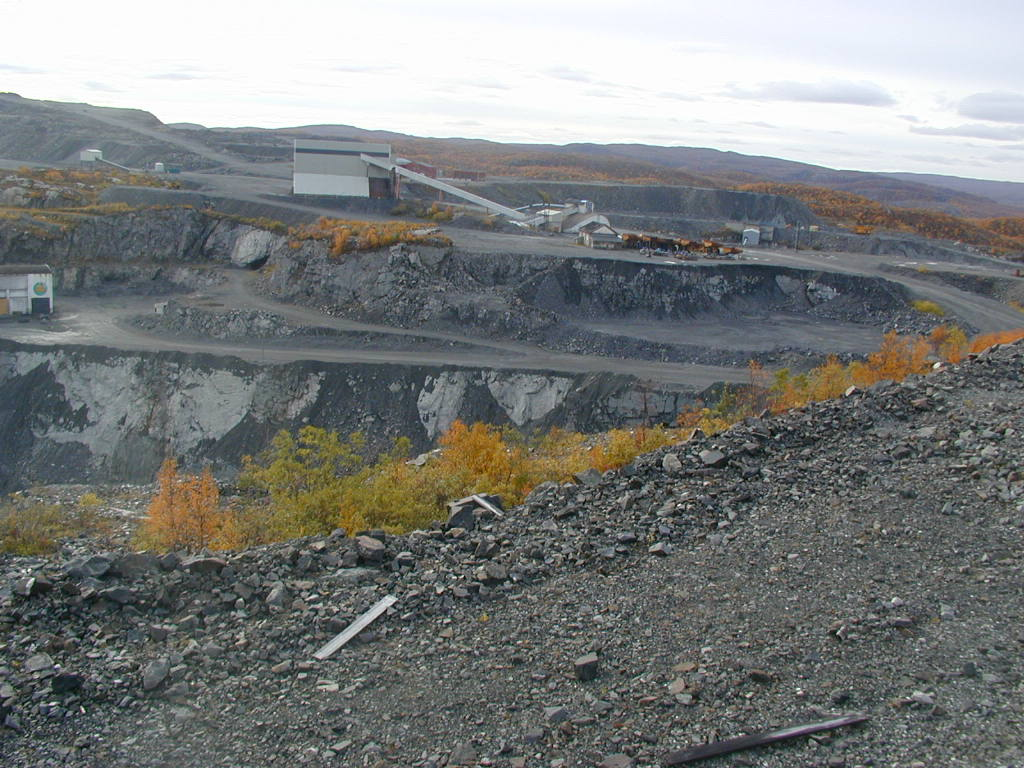
The crusher at Bjørnevatn

In 1966 the company decided to build a pelleting plant in Kirkenes, with the first step being demolishing the old storehouses. The change came after a 45-percent drop in the price of slimes. Financing of the investment was made through issuing fifty percent more shares for a value of NOK 11.25 million. The equipment from the pelleting plant was delivered by Krupp and Allis-Chalmers and facility included a silo for 430,000 tonnes of pellets. Trial production started in September 1969 and full-scale production started on 20 April 1970. By 1969 the company had 900 employees and the following year forty percent of the production was pellets. Managing director Kraft Joahnsen retired in 1970 and was replaced by operating director Hans Lund Andersen, who was replaced by Vidar Lindbo.

Because the mining kept moving further into the mine, the crusher moved in 1971. There were many years of little precipitation in the Lake Inari area, causing reduced power production in the Pasvik River. The company therefore decided to reopen the thermal power plant and start importing electricity from the Soviet Union. The same year a 7,000 square meters (75,000 sq ft) roof was built over the pellets facilities, as snow had been hindering optimal operation, and a new dock was opened for exporting the pellets. This allowed 75,000-tonne ships to dock. This caused Malmfart's ships to become too small and the shipping company sold the three vessels between 1970 and 1972. The company did not purchase any new ships, but remained a registered company until 1980.

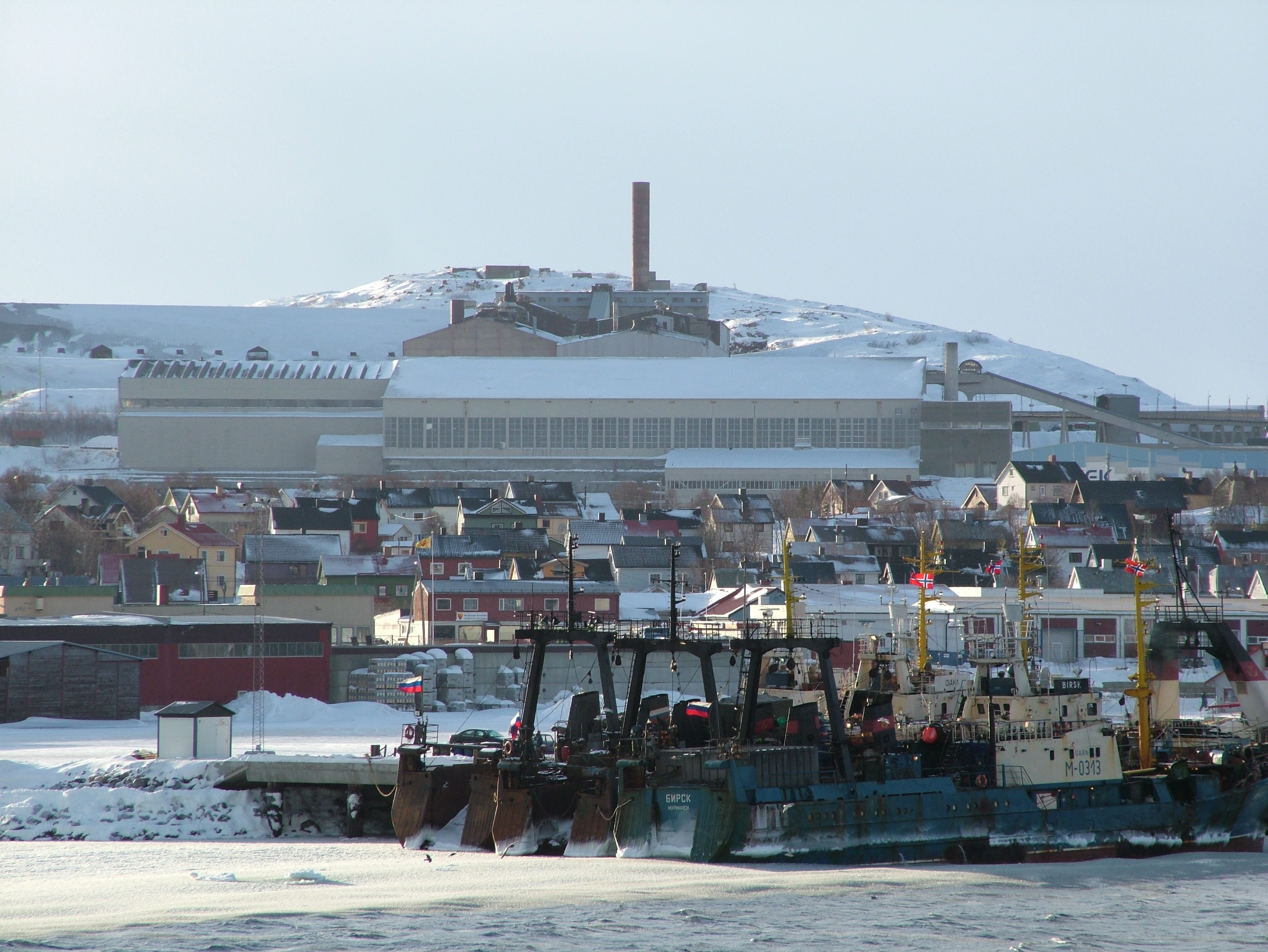
Facilities in Kirkenes

A new workshop at Bjørnevatn was completed in 1973 and the following year a new silo opened at Bjørnevatn, which also allowed for separating out ore with low iron content. Construction of a second pellets facility started in 1972 and was opened on 4 September 1974. This allowed the company's entire production to switch to pellets. Because the two pellets plants used a combined 20,000 tonnes of bentonite each year, a new import dock was built. The pellets production required increased freshwater access. This was fetched from Førstevatn, and to fill that lake, water was pumped from Svartakslavannet.

In 1975 the company shifted its IT systems to a terminal which communicated with a data center in Oslo. The company had 1547 employees in 1975. Lindbo quit in 1976 and was replaced by Ingvald Ohm. He quit the following year and was replaced by Robert Hermansen. Construction of Melkefoss Power Station was started by Sameiet Skogfoss Kraftverk 1976 and completed two years later. Along with Statskog, the municipality and the power company, Sydvaranger established a workshop company at Pasvik. However, this increased transport costs and Sydvaranger would later walk away from the partnership. From the mid-1970s until 1970, Sydvaranger did not produce sufficient slimes themselves and had to import this.

=== Decline and closing ===
Falling ore prices caused the company's first post-war deficit in 1976, of NOK 214.7 million. In wait for better times, production was continued and the pellets stored for later export. The company invested in a HP 3000 minicomputer in 1977 and the following year transferred its public utility services to the municipality. The company transferred its residential real estate to a housing cooperative. A mining strike in Canada caused increased demand and part of the surplus was sold in 1978. Lay-offs were avoided, but some employees took out early retirement and there was a recruitment stop. From 1981 the company received a NOK 50-million subsidy over the state budget, which increased to the double from the next year.

In the mid-1970s, Sydvaranger started planning using natural gas to produce pellets through direct reduction. Originally Karmøy was envisioned as a proper site, but it was eventually decided that there would not be built a pipeline there. Korf Stahl took contact with Sydvaranger and proposed a joint venture to establish a facility in Emden, Germany. They established Norddeutsche Ferrowerke (NFW) in 1976, which was owned 74.9 percent by Sydvaranger and 25.1 percent of Korf Stahl. Construction cost 400 million Deutsche Mark (NOK 1100 million) and had an annual production of 1.2 million tonnes. Financing was in part secured through state guarantees, loans from German banks and a DM 45 million loan from the European Coal and Steel Community. Natural gas was delivered from Norway via Norpipe. Construction started on 17 July 1978 and was taken into use in the second half of 1980. Rising natural gas prices and interest rates combined with sinking ore prices made the plant a financial disaster. The Norwegian government agreed in April 1981 to subsidize operations, which kept the plant going until July 1982, when it filed for bankruptcy. Sydvaranger had guaranteed for NOK 45 million of the loans; this and the bill for the natural gas was covered by the state.

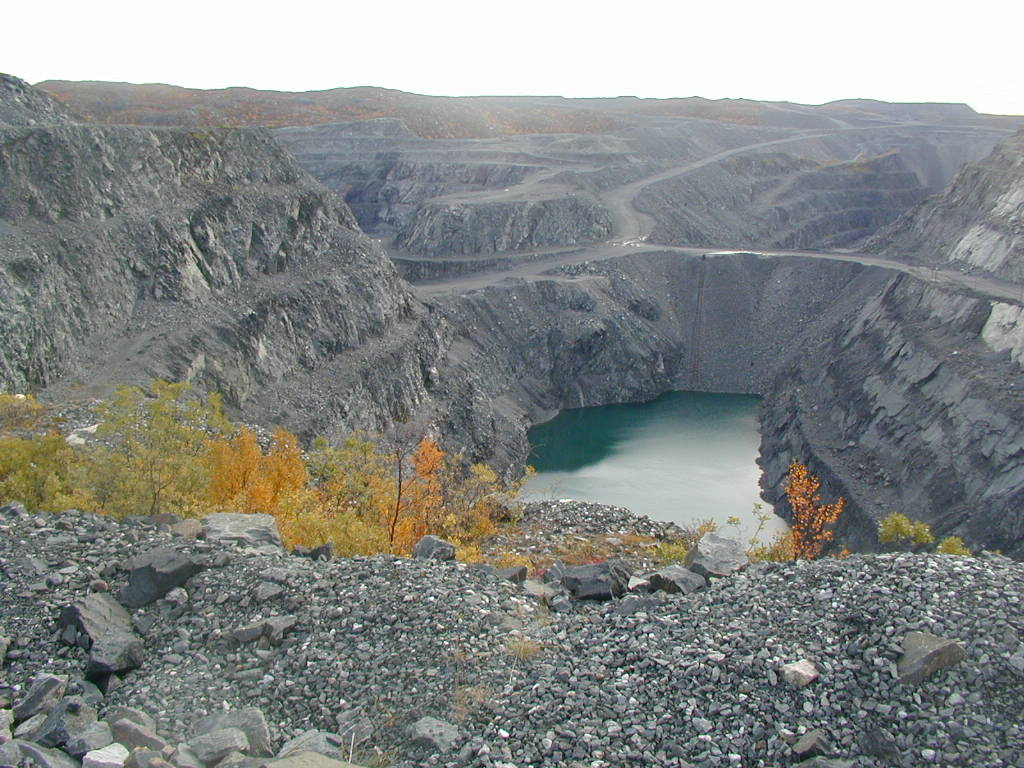
Open-pit mines at Bjørnevatn

The head office was moved from Oslo to Kirkenes in 1982 and Ottar Brekke was hired as managing director from 18 February. He was replaced by Knut H. Hübert two years later. Faults with the exporting facilities caused the silos to fill in late 1982; by January 1983, 800 employees had been laid off. Work on removing gangue started at Bjørnefjell the following year, and mining of the ore there was completed within two years. In 1985 the majority of the board supported gangue removal at Østmalmen, but was met with a dissent of the minority. While the operations were necessary for long-term operations at the mine, it would require state subsidies. State Secretary Kjell Hansen was opposed to the proposal and on 30 April 1985 Parliament cut the subsidies, hindering additional gangue breaking. This caused Hübert to resign and he was replaced by Oddmund Husum. Parliament's decision caused a strike and all production was halted on 2 May. It was found illegal by the Industrial Disputes Court on 14 May, but continued until 5 June.

A used T45 locomotive was delivered in 1984. Mining took place at Jerntoppen from 1986 to 1993 and at Østmalmen from 1989 to 1996. The older pellets plant was closed in 1986. There were proposals to start a coke plant, but these were abandoned and the plant demolished in 1988. Between 1986 and 1990, Sydvaranger halved its output of ore and reduced its workforce from 900 to 600. To help create new jobs, Sydvaranger joined with Valmet to create Kirkenes Mekaniske Verksted. The new company was largely established with state grants and the entirety of Sydvaranger's electrical division was transferred. Sydvaranger shifted part of its production to "Superslimes" with magnetite concentration of between 95 and 98 percent. Production reached 68,000 tonnes in 1990.

Husaas retired in 1989 and was replaced by Øystein Berntsen. A new MaK G 1203 BB locomotive was delivered in 1990, as the T45 had proved no more reliable than the G12s. Construction of a ferrite plant started in 1991, but was delayed several times, including changing the technology and replacing the new oven which cracked. It was completed by 1994 and cost NOK 43.6 million. The company also started pigment production from October 1995.

Map of the Kirkenes–Bjørnevatn Line

Sydvaranger was restructured in 1992, with the company focusing on four production divisions: ore production, Sydvaranger Service, trade with Russia, and shipping. They were act as a purchaser of services within the company, and the other divisions were designated as selling divisions, such as maintenance and service. The production division was free to purchase internally or externally, and the selling divisions were free to sell their services outside the company. At the same time a forum was established with between 15 and 20 employees to create new companies which could utilize the workforce. Only a single project materialized from this. The real estate division was sold to A/S Anlegg in 1994, and the following year the workshops were sold to Steinsvik Maskinindustri. The latter went bankrupt in 2004. By 1994 Sydvaranger had 140 employees, and by 1995 it had 25.

Ragnar Østby was hired as new managing director from 1995. The company also changed its legal name from A/S Sydvaranger to Sydvaranger ASA, a consequence of a legal change and stating it was a public company. The Council of State decided on 10 May 1996 that operations in Sydvaranger were to be terminated within the end of the year. To redevelop the facilities, Kirkenes Utviking was established, which was owned by the municipality, Finnmark County Municipality, the Industrial Development Corporation of Norway and the Industrial and Regional Development Fund. Most of the movable mining equipment was sold at an auction in August 1997.

Between 1976 and 1996, the Government of Norway subsidized Sydvaranger with about NOK 5 billion, and owned 88 percent of the company at the time of the mines shutting down. From the closing to 1999, the company paid out more than NOK 100 million in dividend to the shareholders and was the company during that period to have the second-highest increase in share value increase on the Oslo Stock Exchange.

Negotiations were started with Australian Bulk Minerals (ABM) for a leasing of the mine, the railway and other facilities. An agreement was signed in 1997, with the takeover date set to 31 December 1998. ABM had not secured financing by then, and new negotiations started in 1999, but the deal was laid dead in 2000. Sydvaranger also started negotiating a sale of their share of Pasvik Kraft, and originally planned to sell to Vattenfall and Østfold Energi, but this was stopped by Varanger Kraft. Instead, Varanger Kraft bought the state's ownership in Sydvaranger and other shares, and used their pre-emption right to secure a 100-percent ownership of the company. Sydvaranger was delisted from Oslo Stock Exchange on 12 September 2000. That year the company had five employees and started work on transforming into an investment company with focus on eastern Finnmark.

=== Reopening ===
At the time of the first closure of the mine, the Government of Norway owned 87% of the company. In December 1999 it sold its ownership to Varanger Kraft (who owned 63%) and the Sør-Varanger Municipality (37%). In 1999 Arctic Bulk Minerals bought the production equipment and wanted to attempt new mining activities in the mine, but the attempt failed and the assets were returned to Sydvaranger to pay for the debt. In 2006, the company was sold to Northern Iron Ltd, and the mine was reopened in 2009. External investors invested 2,400 million Norwegian krone (NOK) for the costs of this.

In 2015, the mining company went bankrupt as a result of low iron ore prices. In April 2016 the mine and its equipment was sold for 78 million krone to the Tschudi Group. In 2016, a successful test production took place, proving the plant's operational readiness. As the main mining license was connected to the bankrupt company, an application for a new mining license was submitted in 2017. Significant geological and engineering work was completed in 2017. In 2018, Sydvaranger obtained financing for a restart from the American private equity fund Orion Mine Finance, which is one of the biggest dedicated mining funds in the world. In 2019, the final mining permit was obtained from the Norwegian government, allowing for a planned restart of full-scale operations. As of 2025, the mine remains closed.
