= Maschinenbau Kiel =

German locomotive and engine manufacturer

Maschinenbau Kiel GmbH
- Type: GmbH
- Predecessor: Deutsche Werke
- Founded: 1948; 78 years ago
- Defunct: 1997
- Fate: Split, acquired by Caterpillar Inc., Siemens, Rheinmetall (1990s)
- Headquarters: Kiel, Germany
- Products: Diesel locomotives Diesel engines Armoured fighting vehicle

Maschinenbau Kiel GmbH was a German company that designed, manufactured and marketed marine diesel engines, diesel locomotives and tracked vehicles under the MaK brand name. The three primary operating divisions of Maschinenbau Kiel GmbH were sold to different companies in the 1990s.

Rheinmetall acquired the military vehicles division in 1990. Siemens acquired the locomotive manufacturing division in 1992. Siemens sold the locomotive division to the current owner, Vossloh, in 1998. Caterpillar Inc. acquired the marine diesel engine division in 1997.

Both Vossloh and the marine diesel engine division of Caterpillar are still based in Kiel. Caterpillar continues to use MaK brand name on their products. The companies are major employers in Kiel.

== History ==
=== Origins ===
The companies origins can be traced back at least as far as 1918. With the Treaty of Versailles limiting arms production in Germany, the defence based industries in Kiel sought other markets. Kiel Deutsche Werke AG (DWK) was founded; producing diesel locomotives as well as shipbuilding and firearms manufacture. During the World War II Deutsche Werke AG produced U-boats, as well as locomotives for the Wehrmacht. The end of the second world war brought not only destruction of many of the facilities in Kiel, but also the end of the company.

=== 1948–1997 ===
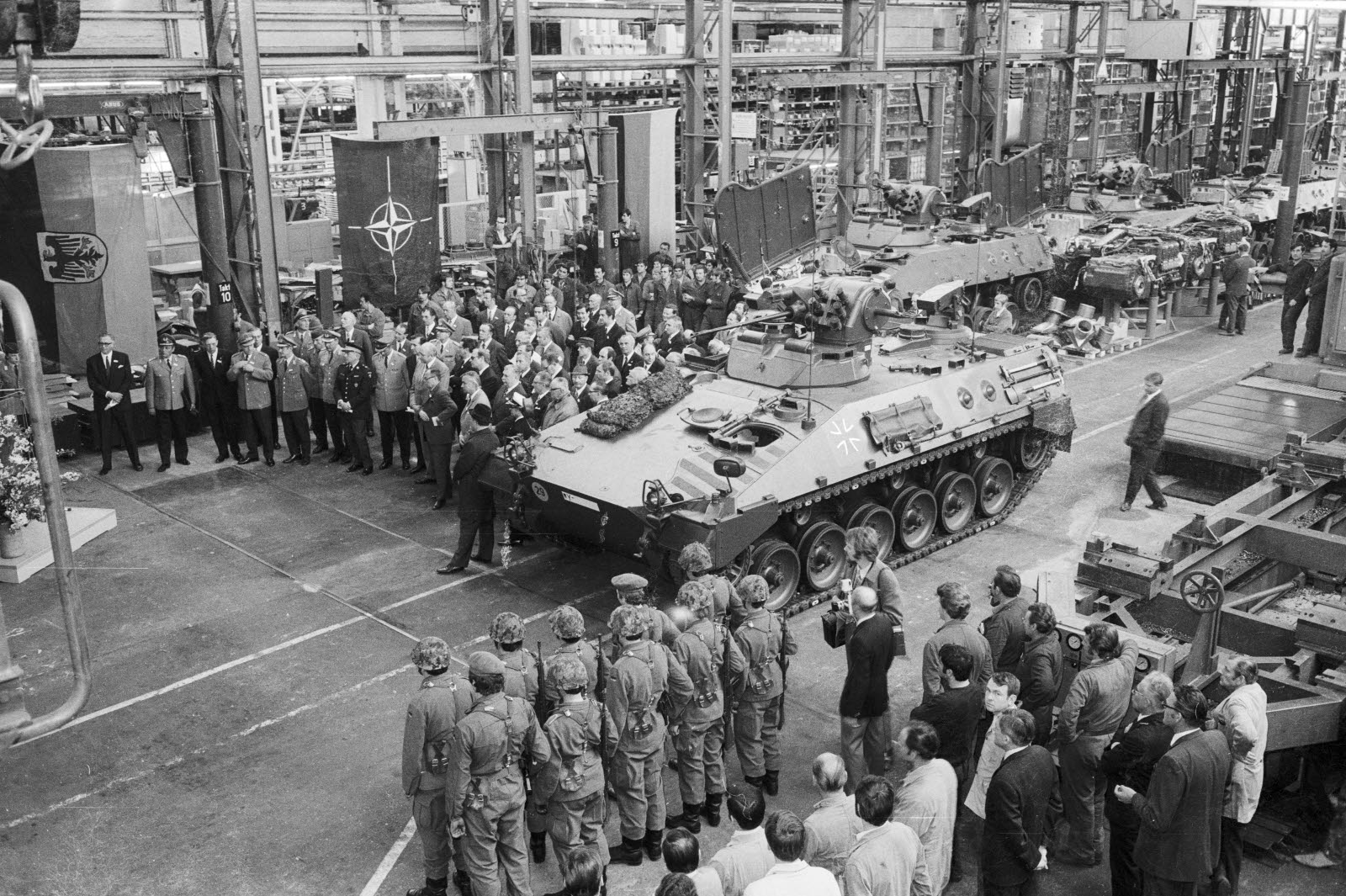
Maschinenbau Kiel AG (MaK) hands over the first Marder to the Bundeswehr on 7 May 1971.

The first production Marder was handed to the West German army on 7 May 1971. Production of the vehicle continued until 1975, with 2,136 vehicles being completed. The company Maschinenbau Kiel was founded on 25 May 1948 as a limited liability company. It included several factories of the former Deutsche Werke AG. In 1954 after a lengthy legal dispute with MAN the name was changed from MAK to MaK. In 1959 a crisis led to the company's purchase by Bremer Atlas GmbH and its conversion into a GmbH (a type of limited liability company).

In 1964 MaK became part of the Krupp group due to the take over of its parent company. By 1990 the production of the Leopard 2 had ended and the prospect of future orders was uncertain; the military equipment production division was organised into a new company MaK System GmbH. which was acquired by the cannon manufacturer Rheinmetall. The locomotive production arm of the company was sold in 1992 to Siemens.

In 1997 the marine engines part of the business was sold to Caterpillar Inc.

== Company divisions ==
=== Diesel engines ===
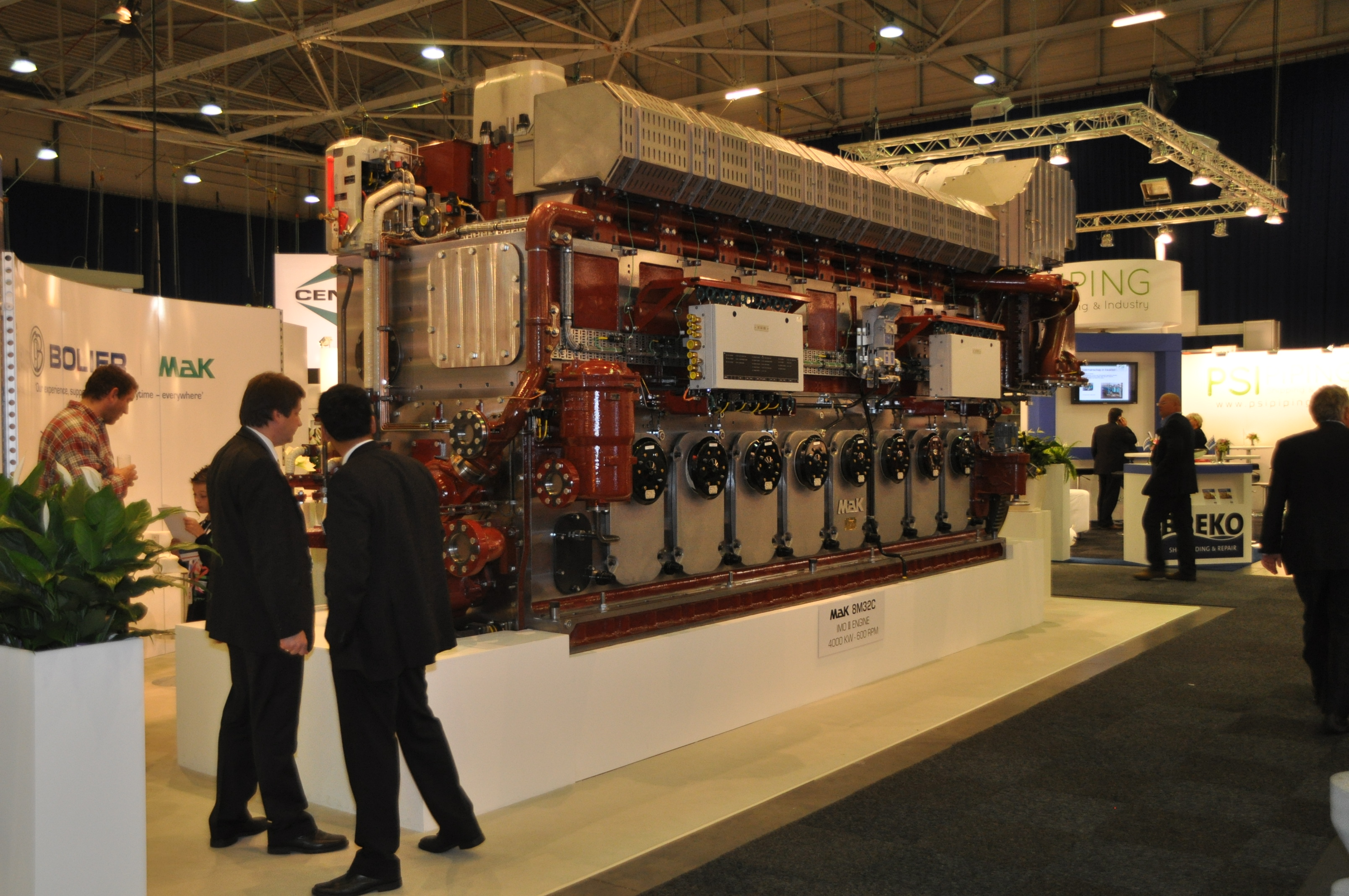
MaK 8M32C marine diesel engine (8 cylinder inline, 4MW)

The marine diesel engines division became Caterpillar Motoren GmbH & Co. KG in 1997 and is now a 100% subsidiary of Caterpillar Inc. The engines still carry the MaK logo. One example of the success of this organisation is the use of four engines of the type MaK 9 M 43 C in the cruise ship AIDAdiva.

The MaK product line as of August 2015 consists of six medium-speed four-stroke diesel and dual fuel engine models. They range in power from 1,020 to 16,800 kW.

Current models apply flexible camshaft technology (FCT) to reduce or eliminate visible smoke at partial load. FCT is also said to improve performance and load pick-up.

=== Locomotives ===
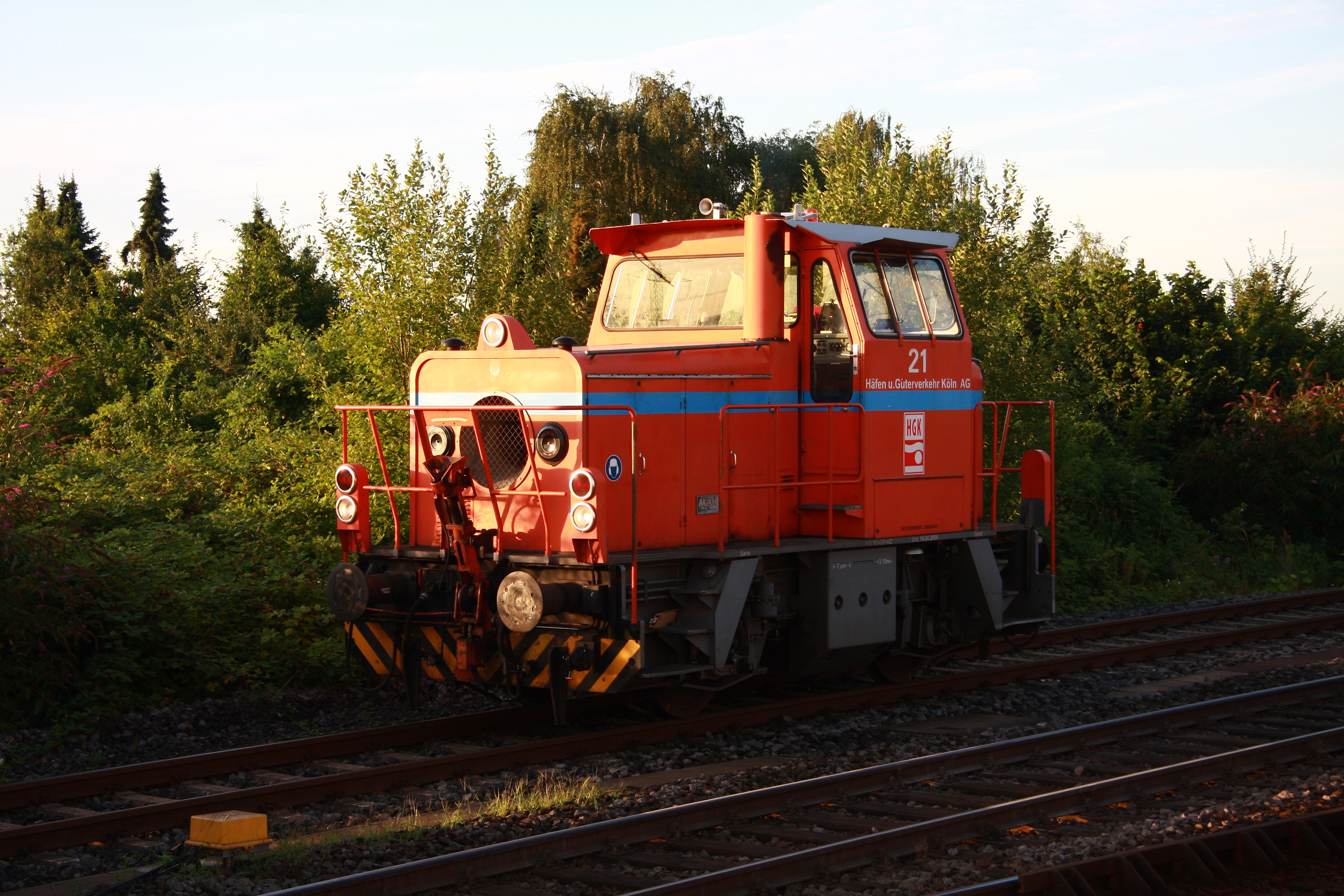
MaK G 321 B locomotive

In the 1950s and 1960s MaK built several designs of rod-coupled diesel locomotives with jackshaft and coupling rod drive. These were sold to numerous private companies to replace steam locomotives.

During the 1950s the plant produced locomotives for the Deutsche Bundesbahn, including the DB Class V 60, DB Class V 65, DB Class V 80

In 1965 native locomotive production began to use cardan shafts as part of the transmission system.

During the 1960s further locomotive models were produced for the Deutsche Bundesbahn including the Class V 90's, DB Class V 100, DB Class V 200 and DB Class V 160.

A third program of locomotive building began in 1979 - based on the standards (Arbeitskreis Standard-Diesellok) produced by the Federal Association of Railways (Bundesverbandes Deutscher Eisenbahnen) which required the use of standard interchangeable components. In the exterior design right angles and flat steel predominate - primarily for cost reasons, internally a switch to faster running engines was made, with engines from MTU being used. The G 1206 BB; a development of the G 1201 BB, with numerous intermediate models, proved notably successful being in production for decades, with a new shunting version introduced in 2007.

In the harsh economic climate of that time the company tried to expand its range - and its customer base. Using electrical components from the Swiss-German company BBC MaK started production of diesel-electric locomotives - some were successful, notably the EN 6400 of which 120 were bought by Nederlandse Spoorwegen.

In 1992 the name of the company was changed to Krupp Verkehrstechnik GmbH (with the corporation of some other companies in the Krupp group). 1994 brought a sale to Siemens and became part of Siemens rail technology (Siemens Schienenfahrzeugtechnik SFT).

On 1 October 1998 the factory in Kiel along with a branch plant in Moers was sold to Vossloh AG. Vossloh Rail Vehicle Engineering (Vossloh Schienenfahrzeugtechnik GmbH) or "VSFT" was the new name.

Under Vosslohs management the locomotives produced carried the traditional MaK logo. On 23 April 2004 the company was renamed "Vossloh Locomotives GmbH"

== Former constituent companies ==
The construction equipment manufacturing company is now known as ATLAS TEREX GmbH.

In 1983 "MaK DATA SYSTEM" emerged as a profit center for the Krupp MaK external information technology service. Since 1995 it has been an independent company: MaK DATA SYSTEM Kiel GmbH.

In 2006, the foundry of the Caterpillar engine works and the former MaK foundry was sold to SHW Casting Technologies GmbH, a foundry group, and now trades under the name Gießerei Kiel GmbH (Kiel Foundry Ltd) or "GK"

== Products ==
- Leopard tank, also produced by Krauss-Maffei Wegmann
- MaK locomotives (category) and Vossloh locomotives (category)
