= SJ T45 =

Class of Swedish diesel-electric locomotives

T45
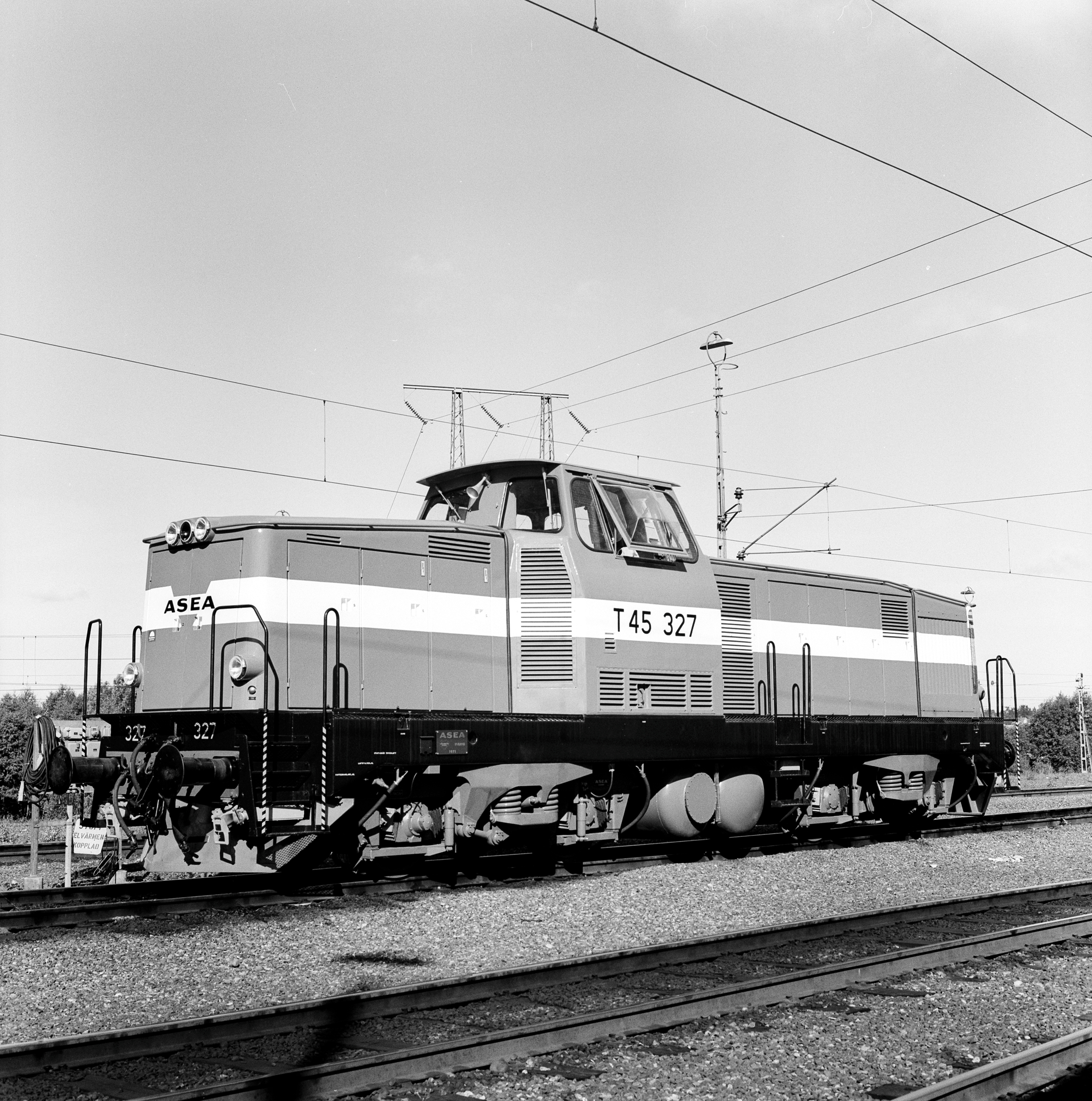
- ASEA T45 327 in 1971
Type and origin
- Power type: Diesel-electric
- Builder: ASEA
- Build date: 1971-1972
- Total produced: 5
Specifications
- Configuration
  - UIC: Bo′Bo′
- Gauge: 1,435 mm (4 ft 8 1/2 in)
- Wheel diameter: 1,015 mm (39.96 in)
- Length: 14,950 mm (49 ft 5/8 in)
- Loco weight: 77 t (75.8 long tons; 84.9 short tons) tare weight
- Prime mover: SEMT Pielstick
- Transmission: Electric
Performance figures
- Maximum speed: 100 km/h (62 mph)
- Power output: 1,470 kW (1,970 hp)
Career
- Operators: Statens Järnvägar
- Numbers: 324 - 328

T45 is a Swedish diesel-electric locomotive operated by Swedish State Railways (Swedish: Statens Järnvägar, SJ) and later other companies. It was in passenger service with SJ from 1971 to 1976, after which it was used in heavy industry. It is the only diesel locomotive to be built by Allmänna Svenska Elektriska Aktiebolaget (ASEA).

The loco used a SEMT Pielstick diesel engine. ASEA used the same bogies and electrical systems as on the Rc locomotive, while Thune of Norway built the mechanical parts.

== History ==
ASEA had been dominating the Swedish market for electric locomotives, but Nykvist & Holm had been dominating the diesel segment. In the late 1960s ASEA decided to enter the diesel market, and in 1969 SJ ordered five units, with delivery in 1971-72. They were dispatched in Borlänge. In 1976 SJ returned them back to ASEA due to them not being reliable enough and that SJ didn't want another diesel engine class. ASEA tried to sell the locos abroad, but only one was sold to Norway. The remaining were sold to industrial companies in Sweden, including the iron mills in Avesta and Hofors.
