= Vectron (locomotive) =

Series of electric or diesel-electric locomotives produced by Siemens

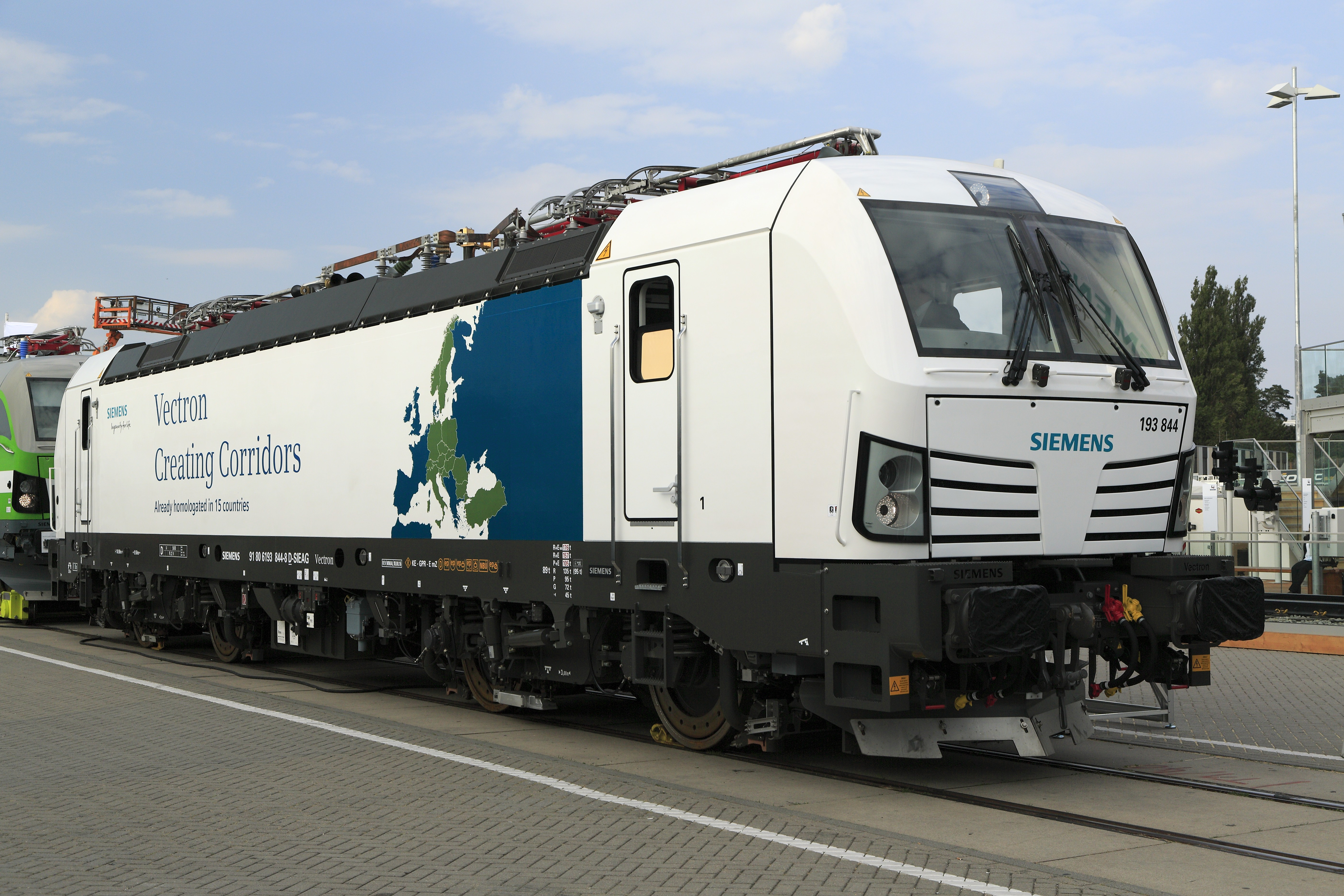
- Siemens Vectron at Innotrans 2016
Type and origin
- Power type: (Diesel)electric (3-phase)
- Designer: Siemens Mobility
- Builder: Siemens Mobility
Specifications
- Configuration
  - AAR: B-B
  - UIC: Bo′Bo′
- Gauge: 1,435 mm (4 ft 8 1/2 in) standard gauge 1,520 mm (4 ft 11 27/32 in); 1,524 mm (5 ft)
- Bogies: Siemens SF4
- Wheel diameter: New: 1,250 mm (49.21 in); Worn: 1,160 mm (45.67 in)
- Minimum curve: 150 m
- Wheelbase: Bogie: 3000 mm
- Length: length over buffers: 18.980 m (62 ft 3 1/4 in)
- Width: 3.012 m (9 ft 10 5/8 in)
- Height: 4,248 mm (13 ft 11 1/4 in)
- Axle load: 22.5 t (22.1 long tons; 24.8 short tons) (maximum)
- Loco weight: ~80–90 t (79–89 long tons; 88–99 short tons)
- Electric system/s: Catenary: Any of 1.5 kV DC, 3 kV DC, 25 kV 50 Hz AC, 15 kV 16.7 Hz AC
- Current pickup: Pantograph
- Traction motors: Siemens 1TB2723-0GA02
Performance figures
- Maximum speed: 160, 200 or 230 km/h (100, 125, or 145 mph)
- Power output: 5.2 or 6.4 MW (7,000 or 8,600 hp)
- Tractive effort: 300 kN (67,000 lb_{f}) (starting)
- Data refers to electric versions, except where noted

The Vectron is a locomotive series made by Siemens Mobility, introduced at the 2010 InnoTrans trade fair in four prototype versions: diesel, multi-system, and both AC and DC electric power. The diesel version has been replaced in 2018 by a dual mode locomotive which is powered by electricity on electrified sections of the track and can be switched to diesel mode on non-electrified sections. The Vectron series is reconfigurable and modular, with a Bo'Bo' wheel arrangement, and is intended as the successor to the EuroSprinter family of locomotives. It can be configured to use any or all of the four electric power systems commonly used in Europe. A more affordable, basic version called Smartron was introduced in 2018.

== Background and design ==
Around the end of the 20th century and the beginning of the 21st century Siemens successfully produced freight and passenger/universal versions of its EuroSprinter locomotive platform; initially made as single voltage machines for European state railways (Austria, Germany), later as multivoltage locomotives for cross border working; this design resulted in numerous orders from both state and private railways, as well as rail leasing companies, primarily in the European Union area.

Siemens identified the potential for further growth in the market, particularly in trans-Alpine freight (Northern Europe to Italy), railfreight from northern European ports into Europe and from Baltic ports into Russia, as well as the potential for growth in newer members of the European Union (Poland, Hungary etc.).

The design incorporates elements from previous Siemens locomotives—the train control package and traction control system are from the ES64F4 and ES64U4 Eurosprinter models respectively, whilst traction system is derived from the ER20 Eurorunner. The cab and replaceable front end (buffer-bar) derives from the latest Eurosprinter model i.e. locomotives such as the Portuguese CP Class 4700 or Belgian SNCB Class 18.

=== Design ===
The Vectron is designed to be easily reconfigurable to a variety of country or work specific configurations; reconfiguration to different safety systems is simplified with pre-designed mounting points for track equipment, modular safety equipment cabinets in the locomotive body and a driver's desk designed for a wide variety of information equipment.

The locomotives are also available in a medium power (5.2 MW or 7,000 hp) version for regional passenger and medium freight work as well as a high power (6.4 MW or 8,600 hp) version. DC only versions are only available in medium power. The standard design speed is 160 km/h (99 mph), which can be upgraded to 200 km/h (120 mph) with the addition of semi-active yaw dampers incorporating a bogie–bogie steering mechanism. Since 2022, the locomotive can also be ordered with a top speed of 230 km/h.

The main body of the vehicle is self-supporting, consisting of an underframe of three longitudinal sill plates (centre and sides), side walls, transverse support members for the bogie pivots and for the transformer, and end sill plates. The roof is in three sections and is removable, and the two driver's cabins also have a replaceable front end. The buffer beam section is also a separate part, which allows replacement if it is damaged in a collision.

The main compartment of the locomotive contains the electrical equipment except the main transformer and batteries which are located below the frame. All electrical components are placed in predefined locations on either side of a central aisle connecting the two cabins with each mounting position being reserved for a single type of equipment.

The bogies transmit tractive force through a central pivot. The traction motors are flexibly supported by the bogie frame, and are connected to the wheelset mounted reduction gears by a multiple disc coupling. A full hollow shaft (folded cardan) drive system is also optional. Mechanical braking is via wheel-mounted disc brakes. Electrical regenerative braking is also used.

The locomotives can work in double, multiple and push-pull formation with other Vectron, Eurosprinter and Eurorunner locomotives as well as some other locomotives fitted with the same multiple working equipment. The design also allows single cab version for use in permanent double coupled locomotive working or for use with passenger trains with a blanking module replacing one of the cab ends.

==== Diesel engined versions ====
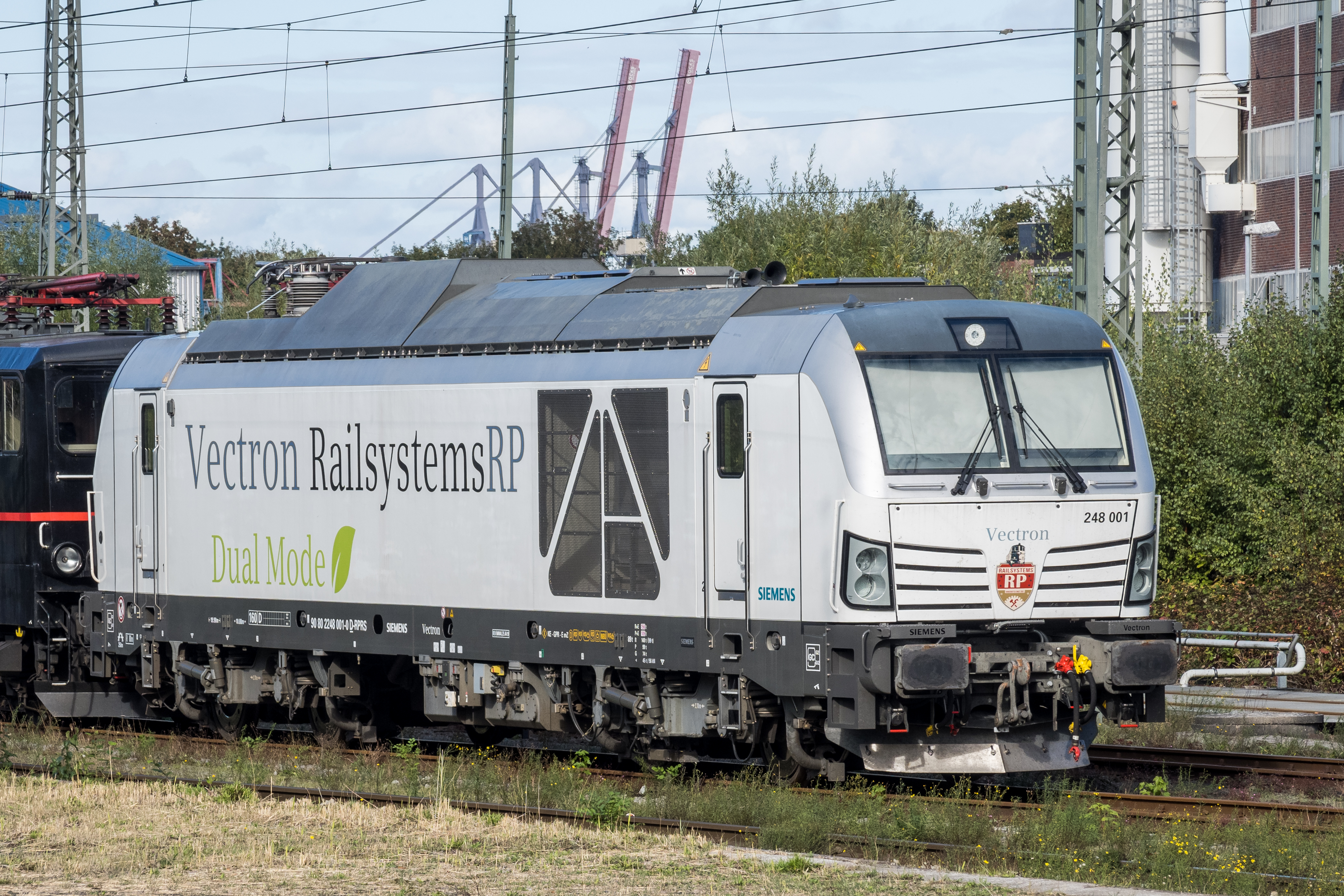
Siemens Vectron Dual Mode

A fully diesel powered version was launched in 2010. The design uses a 2.4 MW (3,200 hp), MTU 16V 4000 R84 engine.

An electric locomotive design with 180 kW diesel engine for shunting operations was presented at the 2012 InnoTrans trade fair.

In 2018, a dual mode locomotive was presented as a combination of electric and diesel locomotive. The new locomotive weighs 90 metric tons. The locomotive is designed to operate on a 15-kV AC electrical system and is equipped with the PZB train protection system. Regardless of its operating mode, the locomotive develops a rating of 2,000 kW at the wheel rim. The Vectron's diesel tank holds 2,500 liters of fuel. The locomotive's top speed is 160 km/h.

== Variants ==
=== Vectron MS ===
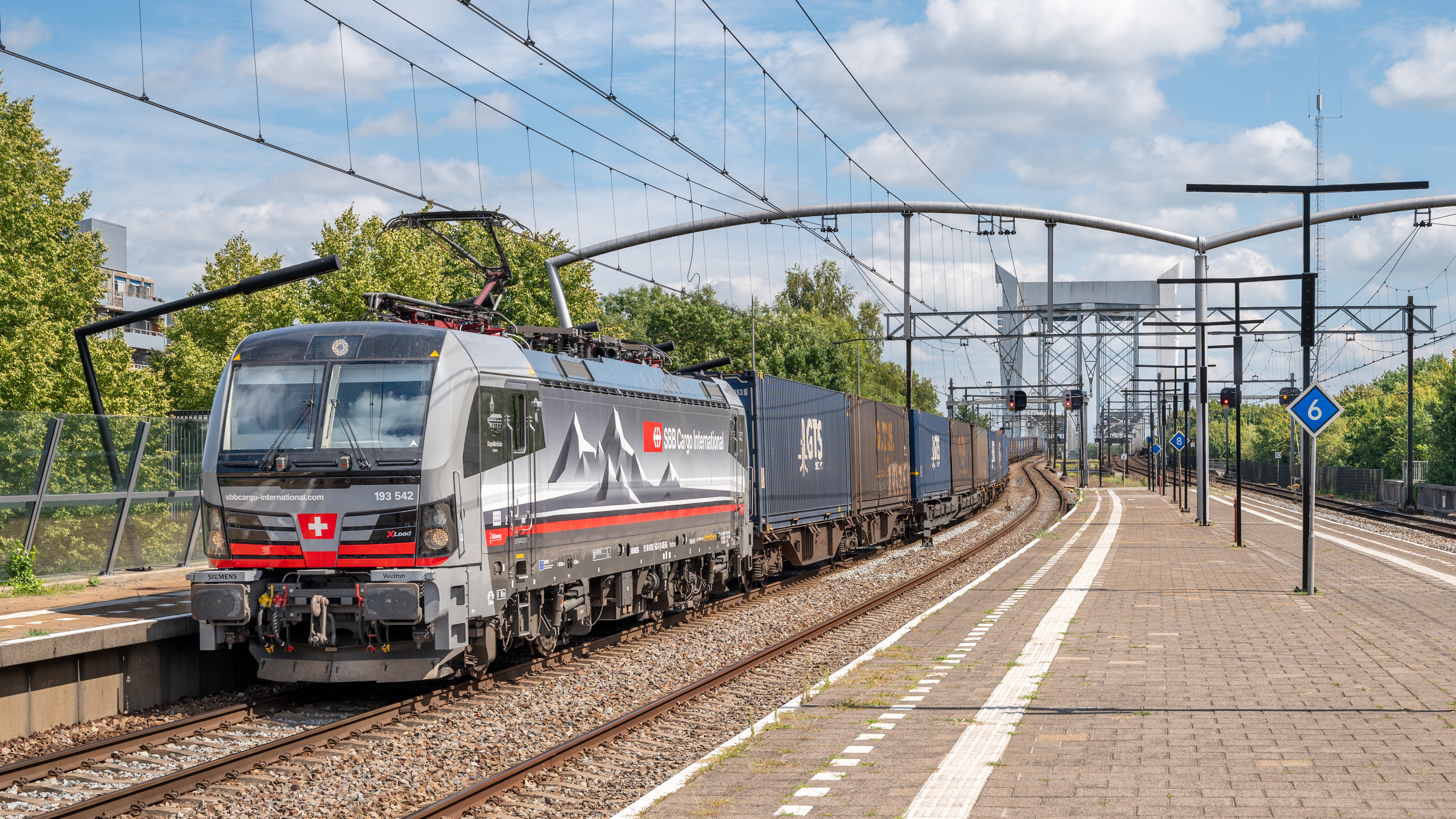
Vectron MS with XLoad (6193 542) operating for SBB Cargo International in the Netherlands

The Vectron MS is the multi-system (MS) version of the family, which supports both alternating current (AC) and direct current (DC) systems including 25 kV 50 Hz~, 15 kV 16.7 Hz~, 3 kV= and 1.5 kV= from overhead catenary.

It has a maximum power output of 6,400 kW (~)/6,000 kW (3 kV=)/3,500 kW (1.5 kV=) and a top speed of 230 km/h (with Vectron 230 Package), 200 km/h (with Vectron 200 package) or 160 km/h (baseline).

The Vectron MS is mainly designed for cross-border and cross-system services between different countries and railway systems on major corridors.

It is designated as Class 193 in Germany, Class 1293 in Austria and Class 383 in Czech Republic.

=== Vectron AC ===
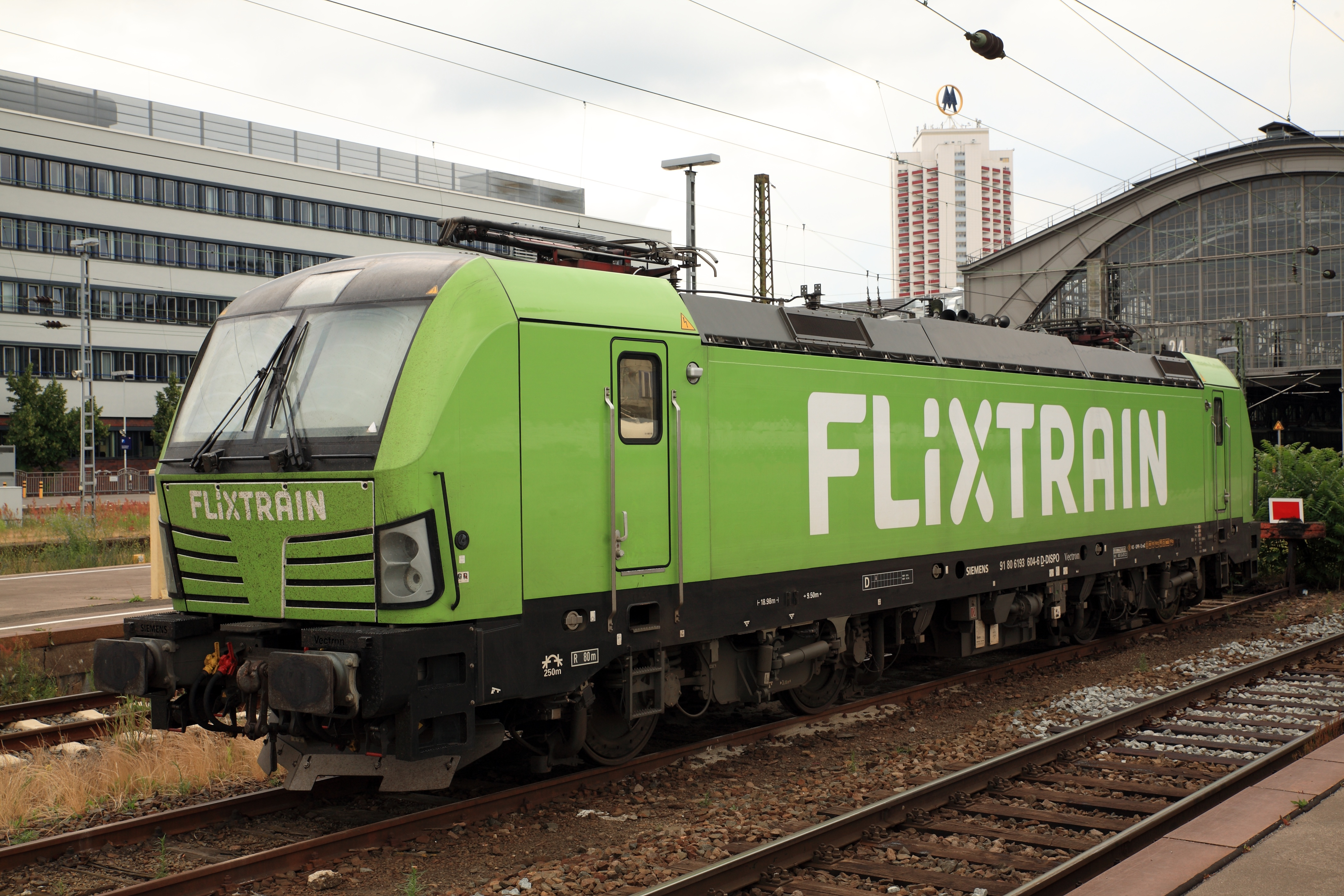
Vectron AC (6193 604) operating for FlixTrain in Germany

The Vectron AC is the alternating current (AC) version of the family.

It supports 25 kV 50 Hz~ and 15 kV 16.7 Hz~ from overhead catenary.

The Vectron AC is mainly designed to operate in countries with AC driven railway systems like Germany, Austria, Denmark, Sweden and Norway.

It is designated as Class 193 in Germany, Class 1193 in Austria and Class EB by the DSB in Denmark.

==== Vectron AC high power ====
The high power variant has a maximum power output of 6,400 kW and a top speed of 200 km/h (with Vectron 200 package) or 160 km/h (baseline).

==== Vectron AC low power ====
The low power variant has a maximum power output of 5,600 kW and a top speed of 160 km/h.

=== Vectron DC ===
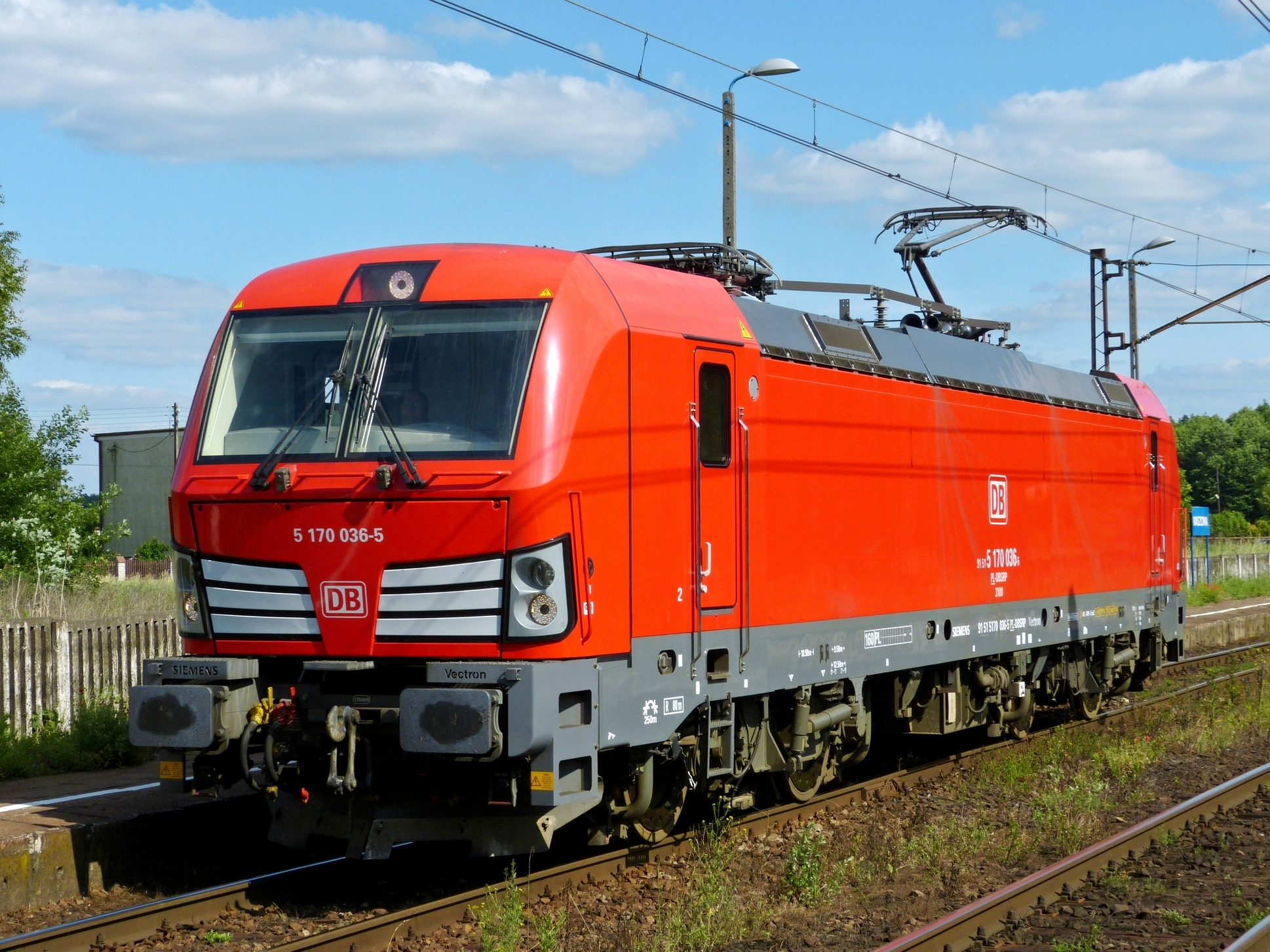
Vectron DC (5170 036) operating for DB Cargo Polska in Poland

The Vectron DC is the direct current (DC) version of the family, which supports 3 kV= and 1.5 kV= from overhead catenary.

It has a maximum power output of 5,200 kW and a top speed of 160 km/h or 200 km/h (with Vectron 200 package).

The Vectron DC is mainly designed to operate in countries with DC driven railway systems like Italy, Belgium and Poland.

It is designated as Class 191 in Germany and Italy, Class 170 in Poland.

=== Smartron ===
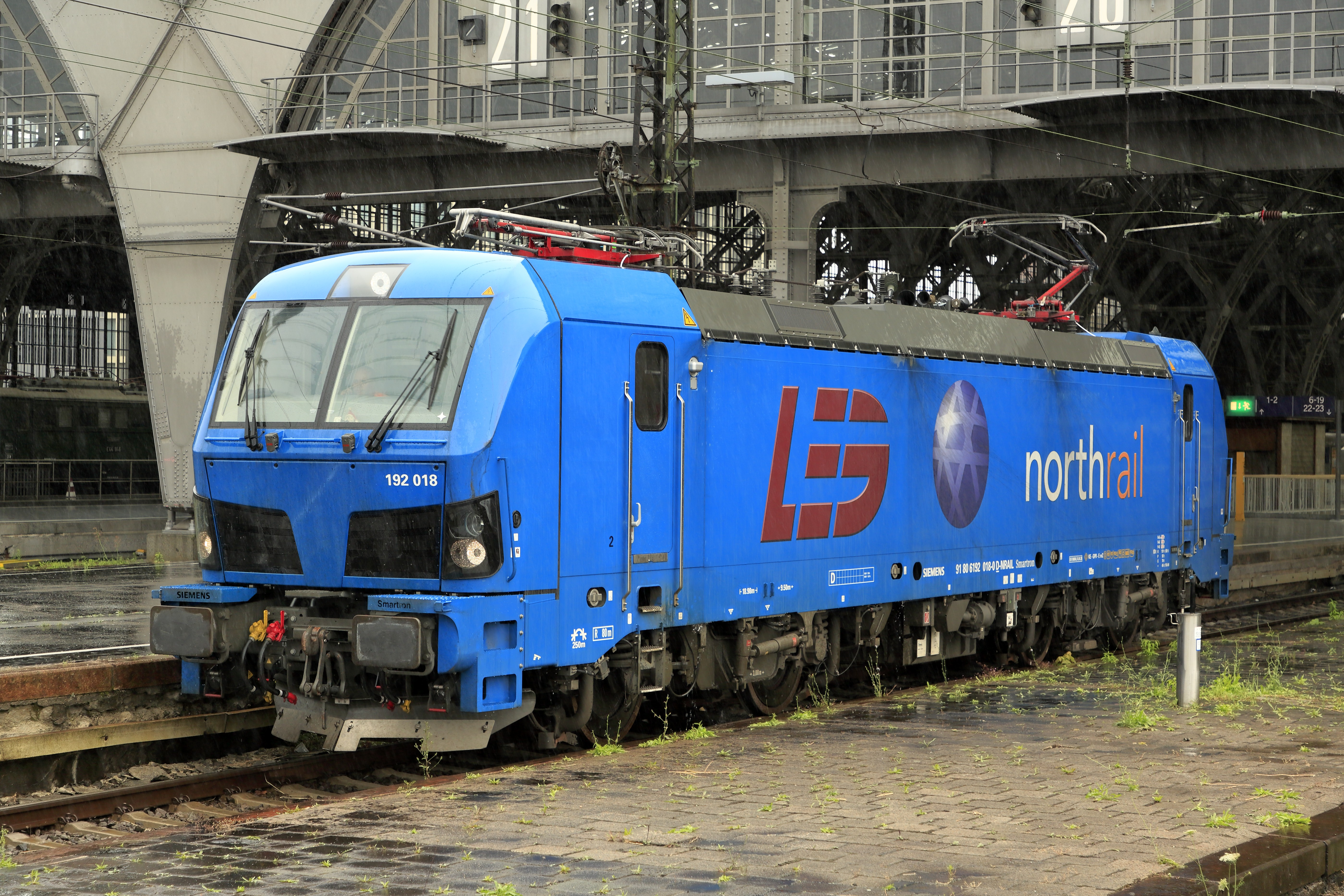
Smartron (6192 018) operated by northrail in Germany

The Smartron is a pre-configured version based on the Vectron AC.

it supports 25 kV 50 Hz~ and 15 kV 16.7 Hz~ systems and has a reduced operating weight of 83 tonnes and a maximum operating speed of 160 km/h.

It is designed to only operate freight services specified in Germany, Romania and Bulgaria and lowering the cost by removing irrelevant packages and multi-system based equipment. Therefore are no customer specified options available.

The Smartron is delivered in a standardized “capriblue” (RAL 5019) color.

It is designated as Class 192 in Germany and Romania, Class 080 in Bulgaria.

=== Vectron DE ===
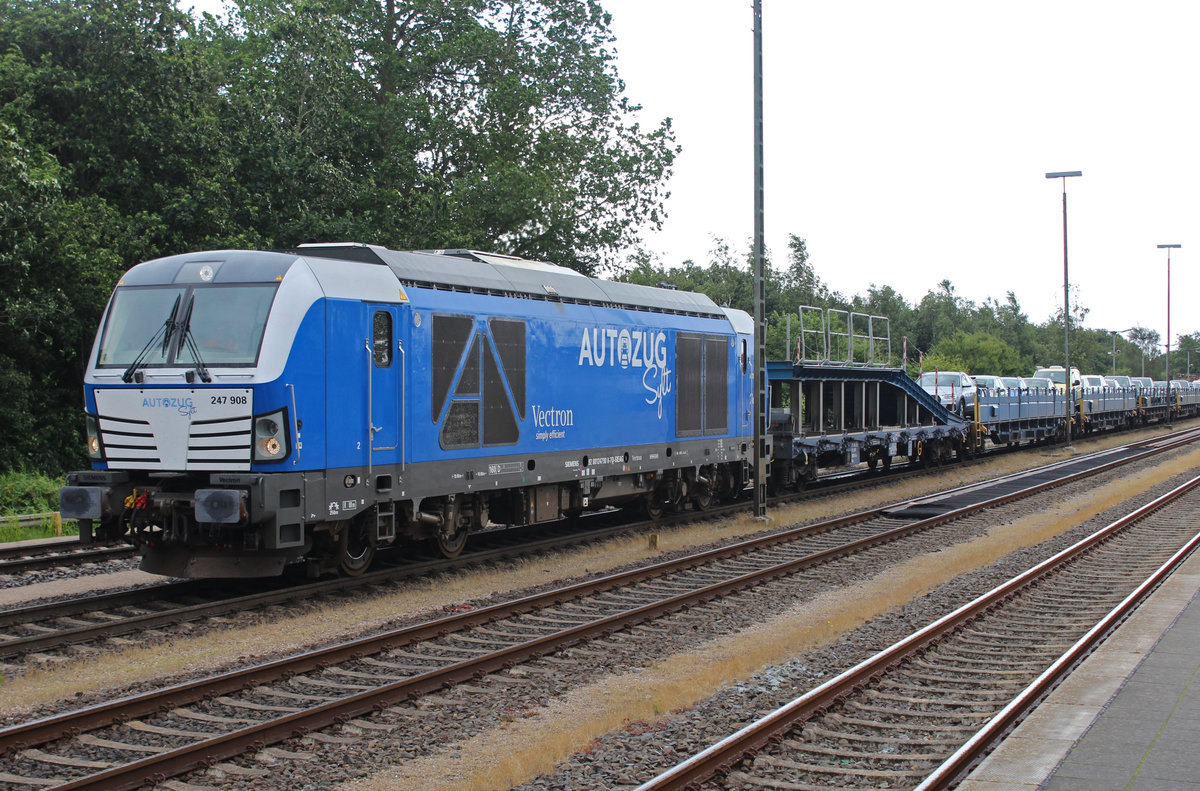
Vectron DE (247 908) operating for Autozug in Germany

The Vectron DE is the diesel powered version of the family.

It has a MTU 16V 4000 R84 diesel engine which has a power output of 2,700 kW. The operational top speed is 160 km/h (100 mph).

The Vectron DE is designed to operate mainline services on non-electrified track segments.

It is designated as Class 247 in Germany.

=== Vectron Dual Mode Diesel ===
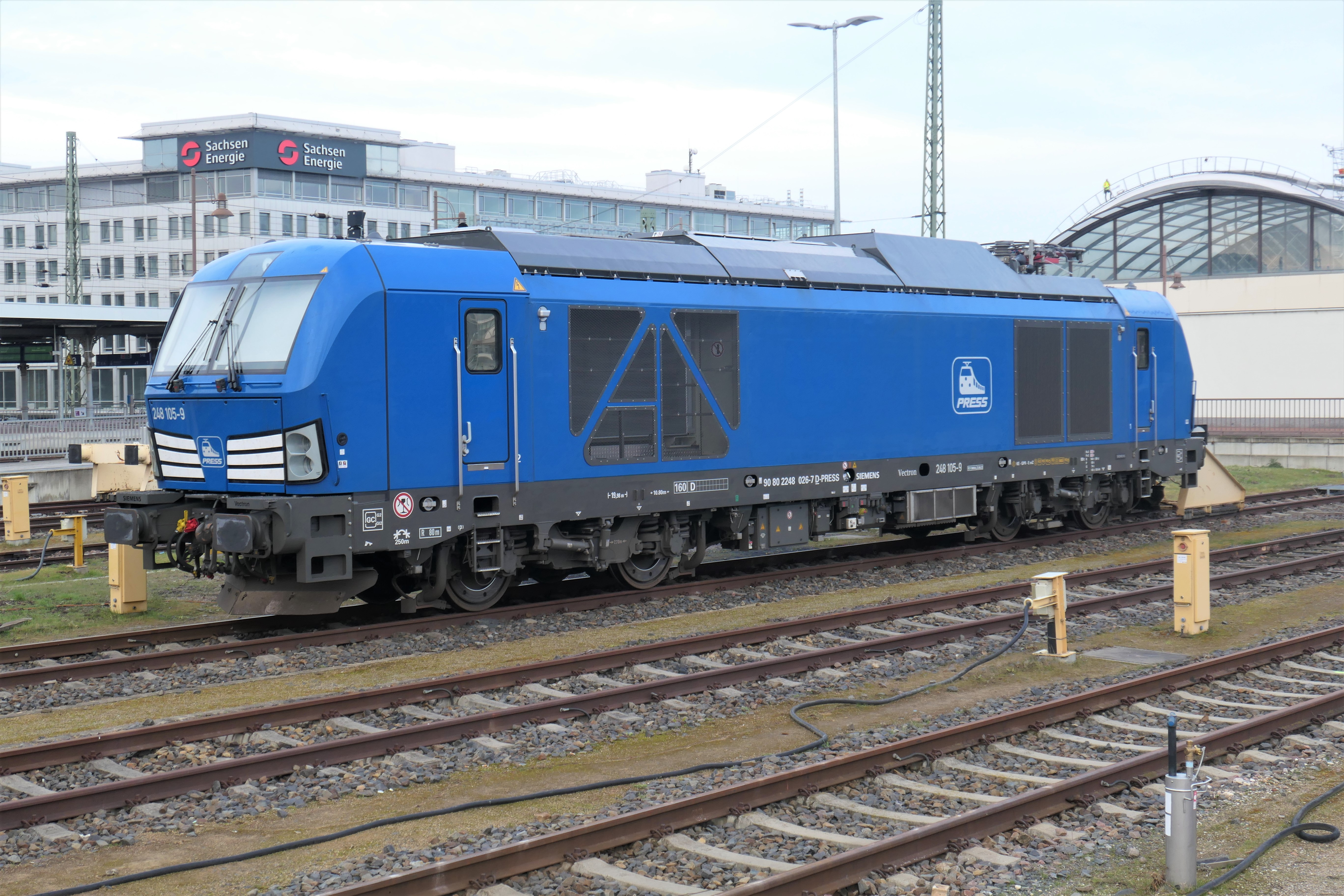
Vectron Dual Mode (248 026) operated by Pressnitztalbahn GmbH in Germany

The Vectron Dual Mode Diesel is the first dual-mode variant of the family.

It supports the 15 kV 16.7 Hz~ electrical system with 2,400 kW output and has a MTU 16V 4000 R84 diesel motor that supports maximum 2,000 kW of output. The maximum operating speed is 160 km/h.

The Vectron Dual Mode is designed to operate passenger/cargo services on a mix of both electrified and non-electrified track segments.

It is designated as Class 248 in Germany and Class 3193 in Austria.

=== Vectron Dual Mode Light ===
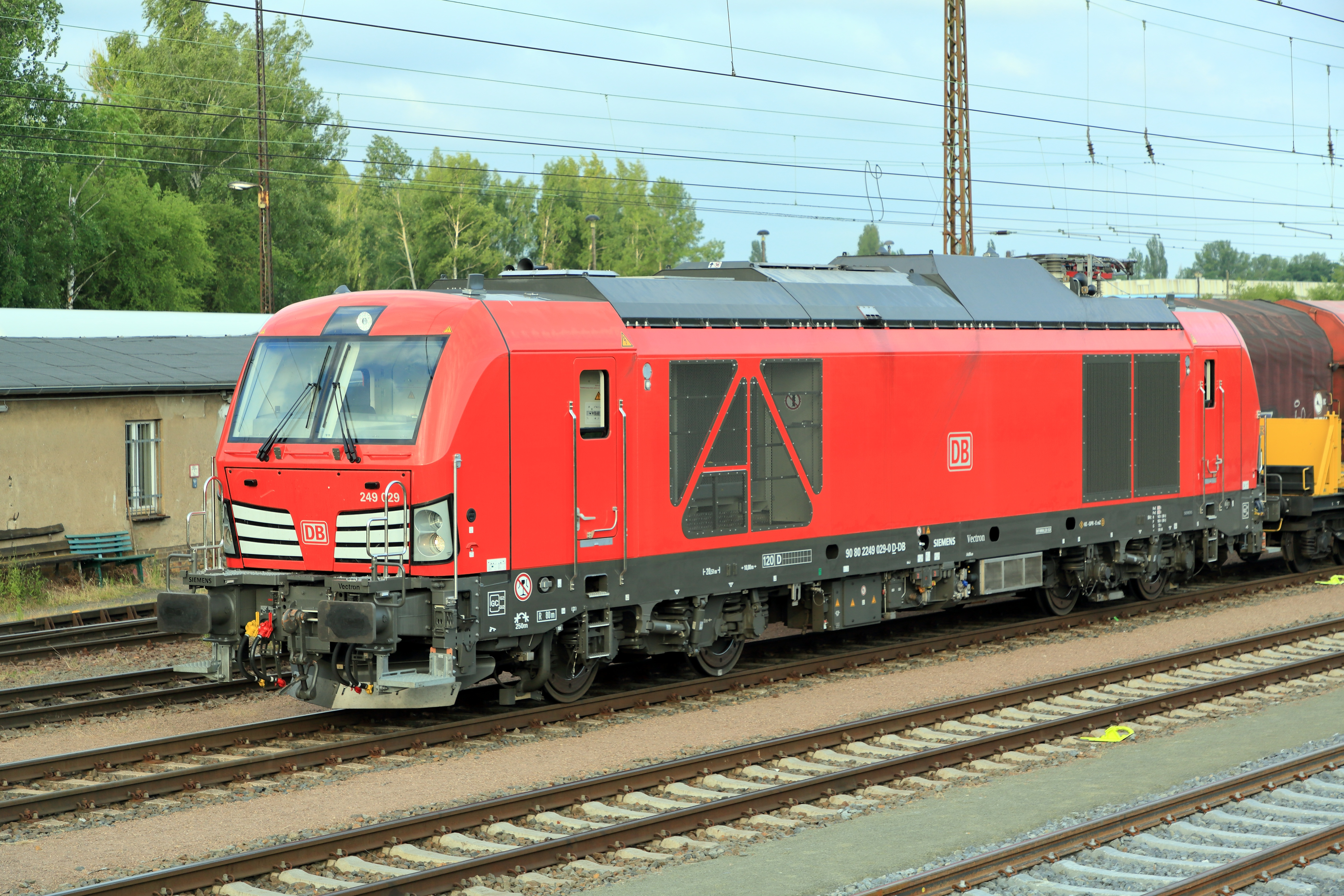
Vectron Dual Mode Light (249 029) operated by DB Cargo in Germany

The Vectron Dual Mode Light is the second dual-mode variant of the family.

It supports the 15 kV 16.7 Hz~ electrical system with 2,210 kW output and has a Cummins Stage V QST30-L diesel motor that supports maximum 750 kW of output. The maximum operating speed is 120 km/h.

The Vectron Dual Mode Light is mainly designed for light-loaded shunting works in the yards and limited mainline operation between depots.

It is designated as Class 249 in Germany.

=== Vectron Dual Mode Electric/Battery ===
The Vectron Dual Mode Electric/Battery is the third dual-mode variant of the family.

It supports the 15 kV 16.7 Hz~ electrical system with 2,400 kW output and has batteries that support maximum 2,400 kW of output. The maximum operating speed is 160 km/h.

The Vectron Dual Mode is designed to operate passenger/cargo services on a mix of both electrified and non-electrified track segments.

== Operations ==
=== Introduction and testing ===
The first locomotives of the type were AC and multisystem locomotives presented at the Wegberg-Wildenrath Test and Validation Centre in June 2010. AC, DC, multivoltage electric system and a diesel engined version were officially launched at the 2010 InnoTrans trade fair.

The Vectron design received certification to operate in Romania in 2012, the DC Vectron version also was homologated for use in Poland in 2012, and the design received European community certification for inter-operability on high-speed rail systems. (EC Decisions 2002/735/EC and 2008/232/CE)

Certification for use of the AC version in Germany was obtained in December 2012, as part of a joint certification procedure between Germany, Austria, Switzerland, Italy and the Netherlands.

Over the night of 25–26 January 2013, a modified Vectron locomotive was tested in the Channel Tunnel.

Certification for use in Austria was obtained in early 2013. Full certification for use in Sweden was obtained in April 2013, replacing a temporary certificate.

The AC version received certification for Hungary in late 2013. In January 2014 the Vectron locomotive class received certification under the EU 'Technical specification for interoperability for Locomotives and Passenger rolling stock' (Decision 2011/291/EU), and in July 2014 the AC version was certified for use in Norway.

The locomotives were released for operation in Turkey in November 2014. Preliminary certifications for some multisystem locomotives in the Czech Republic and Slovakia followed. A preliminary certification for some DC version locomotives in the Czech Republic was reported shortly after. and in May 2015 for Slovakia. In July 2015, the DC version was homologated for Italy. Since August 2015, the MS version is homologated for Poland. The homologation for Croatia and Slovenia was published in September 2015. Since February 2017, the MS version is homologated for Italy.

A Siemens press release on the occasion of 500 sold locomotives revealed that homologations also exist for Bulgaria, Serbia and Switzerland. The MS version was homologated for the Netherlands in September 2017.

The diesel engined version Vectron DE is homologated for use in Germany since September 2014, for use in Turkey since November 2014 and for use in Austria since August 2015.

=== Homologation overview ===
Homologations which cannot be clearly assigned to the locomotive's electric system were assumed on the basis of neighboring countries and current systems and are given in brackets in the following table.

Country	MS	AC	DC	Diesel	Dual Mode
Austria	x	x		x	x
Belgium	x	(x)	(x)		
Bulgaria	(x)	(x)			
Croatia	x	x			
Czech Republic	x	x	x		
Denmark		x			
Finland		x		(Note: Two "Last mile" APU's only.)	
Germany	x	x		x	x
Hungary	x	x			
Italy	x		x		
Netherlands	x				
Norway		x			
Poland	x		x		
Romania	x	x			
Serbia	(x)	(x)			
Slovakia	x	x			
Slovenia	x				
Sweden		x			
Switzerland	(x)	(x)			
Turkey	x	x	x	x	

=== Orders ===
Company	Type	Number	Year ordered	Notes
Railpool	AC	6	2010	For cross-border freight and passenger services in Germany and Austria.
FuoriMuro	DC	2	2012	Italian private operator. Ordered March 2012 for delivery in late 2013.
DB Cargo Polska	DC	23	2012	For freight service in Poland, with delivery from 2012 to 2015, (option for further 13 locomotives). First units delivered December 2012. Four of them are currently leased by PKP Intercity as temporary replacement for EP09 until July 2015.
MRCE	AC	15	2013	160 km/h version, prefitted for conversion to multi-system versions. Ordered by leasing company Mitsui Rail Capital Europe (MRCE), for expected use between Germany, Austria, and Hungary.
BoxXpress	AC	4	2013	For services between Germany and Austria.
CargoServ		1	2013	For use by Cargo Service GmbH. subsidiary of Logistik Service GmbH (LogServ).
Paribus Capital	AC	2	2013	Acquired by Paribus Capital GmbH for lease on passenger services in Sweden.
VR Group	AC	177 (up to)	2013	Contract of 80 VR Class Sr3 units and €300 million with Finnish national operator to replace Sr1 on passenger and freight was finalised in early 2014, with option for 97 more. Series production from 2018 to 2026. 1,524 mm (5 ft) gauge and modified for work down to −40 °C. Also fitted with 'last mile' diesel engines for unelectrified docks and yards. First unit delivered April 2015, for pre-series production testing. Units are winterised, including air intakes on roof. Sr3 is taller than other Vectrons due to equipment on the roof in "a hump". Front looks also different due to missing air intakes and SA3 automatic couplers. In January 2019 the application for usage in passenger trains was denied, due to problems with the STM enabling the ETCS based onboard signalling system to communicate with Finnish signals. There were random emergency brakings. Permission for passenger use was obtained in spring of 2020 after problems with ETCS equipment were fixed.
CFI	DC	2	2014	2 DC units ordered by Compagnia Ferroviaria Italiana (CFI) with 180 kW diesel shunting modules ('last mile diesel') for operations on unelectrified sections.
ELL	AC; MS	50 (up to)	2014	Ordered for leasor European Locomotive Leasing (ELL), part financed by KKR. Agreement for up to 50 locomotives, with AC versions for Germany, Austria and Hungary, and multisystem versions with additional equipment for operating into Poland, Slovakia and the Czech Republic, also fitted with ETCS.
mgw Service		1	2014	Delivery August 2014.
Railpool		5	2014	Order placed by leasing company Railpool GmbH.
MRCE	AC	20	2014	June 2014; twenty 6.4 MW 200 km/h ETCS fitted locomotives ordered.
BoxXpress		4	2014	Delivery starting in November 2014.
Wiener Lokalbahnen Cargo GmbH (WLC)		1	2014	No further details known.
BLS Cargo	MS	15	2015	For operation in Germany, Austria, Switzerland, Italy and the Netherlands, including trans-alpine freight.
ENON GmbH	AC; Diesel	1	2015	ENON GmbH freight subsidiary EGP (Eisenbahngesellschaft Potsdam) ordered a locomotive for cross-border traffic between Austria and Germany. The locomotive is equipped with a diesel engine for shunting or railway siding trips.
ITL Eisenbahngesellschaft	MS	6	2015	Order for three locomotives for use in Germany, Austria, Poland, Czech Republic, Slovakia and Hungary. (option for three more taken in 2016.
PKP Cargo	MS	15	2015	For delivery early 2016 to summer 2017. Equipped for Austria, Czech Republic, Germany, Hungary, Poland, and Slovakia, and with ETCS; 3 locos equipped for Netherlands as well. Option for five further units.
MRCE	MS; AC	21	2015	October 2015; 10 locomotives for use in Germany and Austria, 11 for use in Germany, Austria and Italy. All fitted with relevant national safety systems as well as ETCS.
Railpool		3	2015	Order placed by leasing company Railpool GmbH.
Unicredit Leasing GmbH	DC	8	2015	Locomotives leased by DB Cargo. Delivery from the end of 2016, 5.2 MW, 160 km/h.
EP Cargo	MS	1	2015	Delivery in February 2016. Locomotive homologated for Germany, Austria, Czech Republic, Slovakia, Poland, Hungary and Romania.
Prvá Slovenská Železnicná (PSŽ)	MS	1	2015	Locomotive homologated for Germany, Austria, Czech Republic, Slovakia, and Hungary.
Lokomotion	MS	8	2016	ETCS equipped. For operations in Germany, Austria and Italy.
TX Logistik	MS	10	2016	Purchased by Alpha Trains for lease to TX Logistik. For use between Germany, Austria and Italy, with ETCS fitted.
ČD Cargo	MS	5	2016	The multisystem locomotives can be operated in all countries neighboring the Czech Republic as well as in Hungary and Romania. All locomotives will be equipped with train control systems for these countries as well as the European Train Control System (ETCS). The locomotives have a maximum output of 6,400 kW and a top speed of 160 km/h.
PIMK	AC	2	2016	Two units ordered by PIMK (Bulgaria), one of which is former 5.6MW test locomotive 192 962.
Railpool	AC; MS	5	2016	Five locomotives ordered with an option for a further ten, for use in Germany, Austria, Hungary and Romania.
ELL		50 (up to)	2016	Up to 50 further locomotives for European Locomotive Leasing from Netherlands or Germany to Italy and central European countries.
MRCE	MS	10	2016	For use between Germany, Austria and Italy.
Hector Rail	AC	20	2016	5 locomotives ordered in 2016. Option for 15 additional locomotives changed to order in 2017.
mgw Service		1	2016	Delivery in October 2016.
Railcare	AC	7	2016	6.4 MW 15 kV AC with last mile diesel for use in Switzerland, Austria, and Germany.
Infraleuna GmbH	DE	1	2016	Infraleuna is the first external customer for the diesel-electric Vectron DE. Delivery in the first half of 2017.
DB Cargo	DE	4	2017	DB Cargo Deutschland operated the Vectron DE locomotives on long-term hire from Siemens. After the end of the hire, two locomotives were sold by Siemens to RTS - Rail Transport Service GmbH, the other two to ENON GmbH.
LokRoll AG	MS	18	2017	Locomotives leased by SBB Cargo.
ÖBB	MS	200	2017 till 2025	Framework contract for the delivery of up to 100 alternating current (AC) locomotives, 50 alternating current (AC) locomotives with diesel power modules and 50 multisystem (MS) locomotives. A firm order for 30 MS locomotives was placed at the signing. Till 2025, all of the locomotives were ordered in the MS variant.
GySEV	AC	9	2017	Two alternating current (AC) locomotives with diesel power modules and 3 multisystem (MS) locomotives ordered, four AC locomotives
Unipetrol Transport	MS	3	2017	6.4MW, for use in the Czech Republic, Germany, Austria, Poland and Slovakia
ITL Eisenbahngesellschaft	MS	6	2017	Three locomotives for use in Germany, Austria, Poland, Czech Republic, Slovakia, Romania and Hungary, three more additionally also homologated for the Netherlands.
ČD Cargo	MS	3	2017	The multisystem locomotives can be operated in all countries neighboring the Czech Republic as well as in Hungary, Slovenia and Romania.
Hupac	MS	8	2017	6.4MW, for use in Germany, Austria, Switzerland, Italy and the Netherlands.
InRail	DC	3	2017	DC locomotives for use in Italy.
Deutsche Bahn	MS	100 (up to)	2017	60 locomotives from framework agreement ordered. For use in Germany, Austria, Switzerland, Italy, the Netherlands and (from 2020) Belgium. The subtype certified for Belgium (D-A-CH-I-NL-BE) is classified as MS A39.
MRCE	MS	10	2017	For use between Germany, Austria, Italy, Switzerland and the Netherlands.
MRCE	DC	40 (up to)	2017	20 ordered for use in Italy, option for further 20.
ZSSK, leased from S Rail Lease	MS	10	2017	For use between Bratislava and Košice. Now also in use between Vienna and Bratislava.
RDC Autozug Sylt GmbH	DE	2	2017	For car shuttle trains to the island of Sylt.
Stern & Hafferl Verkehr	DE	1	2017	Locomotive 247 905 was previously used by Siemens for tests and presentation.
ENON GmbH	AC	1	2017	For use in Austria and Germany.
Adria Transport	MS	1	2018	Locomotive 193 822.
DMV Cargo Rail	AC	2	2018	Locomotives 192 961 and 193 972.
Industrial Division	MS	1	2018	For use in Poland, Germany, Austria, the Czech Republic, Slovakia, Romania and Hungary.
DSB	AC	42	2018 / 2020	For use in Denmark (from 2021) and eventually Denmark-Germany cross border services (Possibly Sweden and Norway in the future, as these countries utilize same electrification as Germany). Original contract was for 26 units with option for additional 18. In 2020 Siemens Mobility and DSB released a press release announcing that the DSB order was raised to 42 locomotives, bringing the total number of Vectron locomotives sold to 1003.
MRCE	MS; AC	25	2018	20 MS locomotives, 5 AC locomotives
Srbija Kargo	MS	16	2018	For use in Serbia, Croatia, Hungary, Austria and Germany
LocoItalia	DC	4	2018	Option for 15 more
EP Cargo	MS	1	2018	
Eisenbahngesellschaft Potsdam	Smartron	4	2018	
RTB Cargo	MS	3	2018	
ČD Cargo	MS	4	2018	
EP Cargo	MS	8	2018; 2019; 2024	Option for two more
Infraleuna	Smartron	2	2018	
e.g.o.o.	Smartron	1	2019	
Deutsche Bahn	MS	100 (up to)	2019	40 locomotives ordered with signing of framework agreement.
Slovenská plavba a prístavy (SPAP)	MS	1	2019	
Advanced World Transport (AWT)	MS	3	2019	
Metrans Rail	MS	10	2019	
Paribus	Smartron	22	2019 to 2024	Orders from a framework contract over 25 locomotives in total
Budamar	MS	5	2019	
Industrial Division	MS	5	2019	
BBL Logistik	Smartron	1	2019	
Spitzke Logistik	Smartron	1	2019	
Eisenbahnen und Verkehrsbetriebe Elbe-Weser	Smartron	1	2019	
SüdLeasing	MS	20	2019	Locomotives leased by SBB Cargo. Option for 20 more.
PIMK	Smartron	3	2019	
E-P Rail	Smartron	5	2019	
BLS Cargo	MS	25	2019	
Laude	MS	1	2019	
Railtrans International	MS	2	2019	
GySEV Cargo	MS	1	2019	Former Siemens test locomotive
Railsystems RP GmbH	DM Diesel	2	2019	First order for dual mode locomotive
RTB Cargo	MS	2	2019	
Widmer Rail Services AG	MS	2	2019	
GTS Rail	DC	3	2020	
Mindener Kreisbahnen	DM Diesel	2	2020	
Bulmarket	Smartron	10	2020	
Bulgarian State Railways	Smartron	15	2020	
Unicom Tranzit	Smartron	2	2020	
MMV Rail	Smartron	1	2020	
Unipetrol Transport	MS	4	2020	
DB Cargo	DM Diesel	100	2020	Option for 250 more
RheinCargo	Smartron	8	2020 / 2023	Locomotives numbered 91 80 6 192 031−034, 045
PCW	DM Diesel	1	2020	
Stern & Hafferl Verkehr	DM Diesel	1	2020	Order number undisclosed
Lotos Kolej	MS	1	2020	
FOXrail	AC	1	2021	Option for one more
Stern & Hafferl Verkehr	DM Diesel	3	2021	
DB Cargo Polska	MS	4	2021	
LTE Logistik- und Transport	MS	6	2021	
Raaberbahn Cargo	MS	1	2021	
ITL Eisenbahngesellschaft	DM Diesel	2	2021	
Paribus Capital	DM Diesel	30	2021 / 2022	
ELL	MS	2	2021	Former Siemens-owned stock locomotives.
Railpool	MS	20	2021	
Správa železnic	MS	1	2021	Use for diagnostics of the Czech and foreign railway networks
Cargounit	MS	30	2021 / 2022 / 2023	
ČD Cargo	AC	2	2021	
Akiem	MS	20	2021	Out of a framework contract over an undisclosed number of locomotives
Cargounit	Smartron	2	2021	
Railpool	MS	70	2022	Out of a framework contract over 100 locomotives
DB Cargo	DM Diesel	50	2022	Orders from the framework contract from 2020, four of them for DB Bahnbau Gruppe
Alpha Trains	AC; DM Diesel	?	2022	Framework contract with undisclosed number of locomotives, undisclosed number already ordered
České dráhy	MS	50	2022	First Vectron locomotives with top speed of 230 km/h
National Authority for Tunnels	AC	41	2021 / 2022	For use in Egypt
SüdLeasing	MS	20	2022	Locomotives leased by SBB Cargo
Hector Rail	AC	4	2022	
LokRoll 3 AG	AC	35	2022	Locomotives leased by SBB Cargo
ČD Cargo	MS	10	2022	
MRCE	MS	14	2022	
Akiem	AC; MS	65	2022	Out of a framework contract over an undisclosed number of locomotives
DB Fernverkehr	DM Diesel	21	2022	Ordered from the framework contract with DB Cargo from 2020
ITL Eisenbahngesellschaft	DM Diesel	8	2022	
Press	DM Diesel	1	2022	
Alpha Trains	MS	15	2022	Out of a framework contract over an undisclosed number of locomotives
Fenniarail	AC	5	2022 / 2024 / 2026	
Alpha Trains	AC; MS	15	2022	Out of a framework contract over an undisclosed number of locomotives
Cargounit	Smartron	2	2022	
Eisenbahngesellschaft Potsdam	DM Diesel	2	2022	
Alpha Trains	DM Diesel	1	2022	Leased to e.g.o.o., out of a framework contract over an undisclosed number of locomotives
RheinCargo	DM Diesel	7	2023	
BUG Vermietungsgesellschaft	DM Diesel	1	2023	
Eiffage Infra-Bau	DM Diesel	1	2023	
Cargounit	Smartron	2	2023	
Railtrans International	MS	2	2023	
TX Logistik	MS	40	2023	
Alpha Trains	DM Diesel	1	2023	Leased to Holzlogistik und Güterbahn GmbH (HLG), out of a framework contract over an undisclosed number of locomotives
DPB	MS	6	2023	
Medway	MS	15	2023	
Akiem	AC; MS	15	2023	Out of a framework contract over an undisclosed number of locomotives
BLS Cargo	MS	10	2023	
Beacon Rail	MS	10	2023	
European Locomotive Leasing	MS; DM Diesel	60	2023	Out of a new framework contract over 200 locomotives
Northrail	DM Diesel	15	2023	
Bulgarian State Railways	Smartron	10	2024	
Unipetrol Transport	MS	4	2024	
Railpool	AC; MS	46; 24	2024	Out of a framework contract over 250 locomotives
Cargounit	Smartron	10	2024	
Cargounit	MS	42	2024 / 2025	Out of a framework contract over 90 locomotives
InRail	MS	2	2024	
Rail Traction Company	MS	4	2024	
Raaberbahn Cargo	MS	1	2024	
SüdLeasing	MS	20	2024	Locomotives leased by SBB Cargo
Alpha Trains	MS; DM Diesel	35; 15	2024; 2025	Framework contract, with option for 20 more. Among the order are the first Vectron MS locomotives for use in France.
RS Lease	MS	30	2024	Framework contract, with option for 35 more MS and Dual Mode locomotives.
Beacon Rail	MS	25	2024	Out of a framework contract over an undisclosed number of locomotives
Green Mobility Partners	MS	18	2024 to 2026	Framework contract, with option for 32 additional locomotives.
DPB	DM Diesel; MS	2; 7	2024; 2026	
LocoItalia	MS	1	2025	
JeMyn AG/Widmer Rail Services AG	AC	2	2025	Including a battery power module
RIVE Private Investment (Northrail)	DM Diesel	23	2025 / 2026	Out of a framework contract with options for 27 more locomotives
DPB	DE	1	2025	
Swietelsky	DM Diesel	6	till 2025	
CER Cargo	MS	2	2025	
Akiem	DM Diesel	20	2025	Out of a framework contract with options for 30 additional locomotives
Cargounit	MS	10	2025	
Kreisbahn Siegen-Wittgenstein	DM Diesel	1	2025	
Laude Smart Intermodal	MS	2	2025	
Hamburger Rail Service	DM Diesel	3	2025	
Metrans Rail	MS	50	2019 to 2025	60 ordered locomotives are mentioned in the source, which means that 50 additional locomotives were ordered since the 2019 contract for 10 machines, with an option for 10 more.
Akdoğan Train Cargo	MS	5	2025	With options for 5 additional locomotives.
Anapet Transportation	AC	1	2025	
GTS Rail	MS	3	2025	
Widmer Rail Services AG	MS	1	2025	
Slovenian Railways	MS	4	2025	
Hamburger Rail Service	DM Diesel	1	2026	
Wedler Franz Logistik	DM Diesel	4	2026	
Fenniarail	AC	2	2026	
Akiem	DM E/B ?	50	2026	Out of a framework contract over undisclosed variants with an option for 30 more, including the first battery-electric dual mode locomotives
Steiermarkbahn Transport und Logistik	DM Diesel	1	2026	
RailAdventure	DM Diesel	1	2026	
Trafikverket	AC	10	2026	Locomotives for long-distance daytime and overnight trains built by Talgo for use with up to 200 km/h in Sweden and Norway, with options for 9 additional locomotives.
Zugpilot GmbH	DM Diesel	1	2026	
ENNA Logic	MS	5	2026	
Srbijavoz	MS	6	2026	For use on services to Budapest
Railpool	AC; DM Diesel	30; 50	2026	With options for 20 additional locomotives.
Autoritatea pentru Reformă Feroviară (ARF)	AC	23	2026	
SRI Rail Invest GmbH	DM Diesel	1	2026	

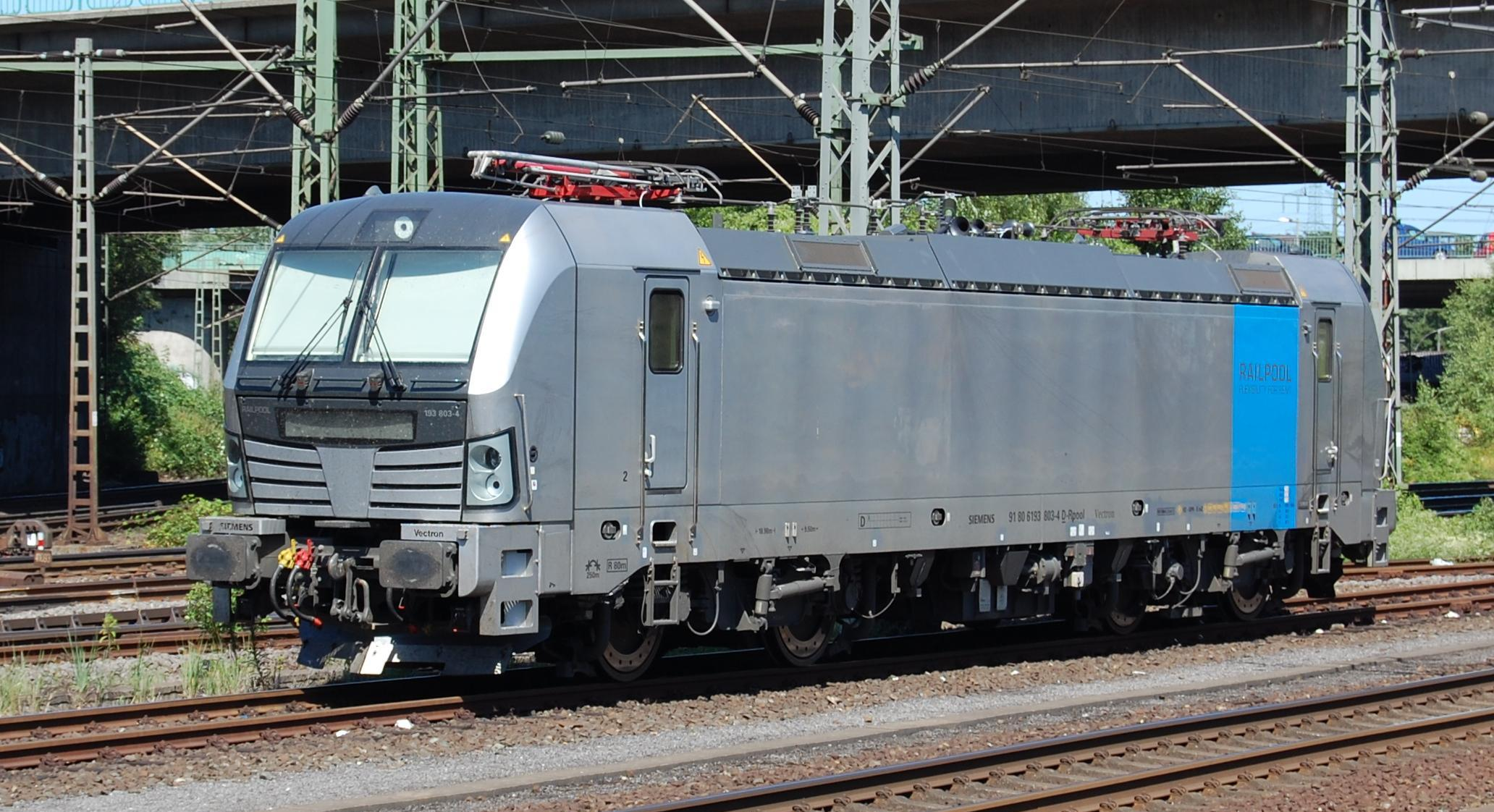
Railpool (Harburg, July 2013)

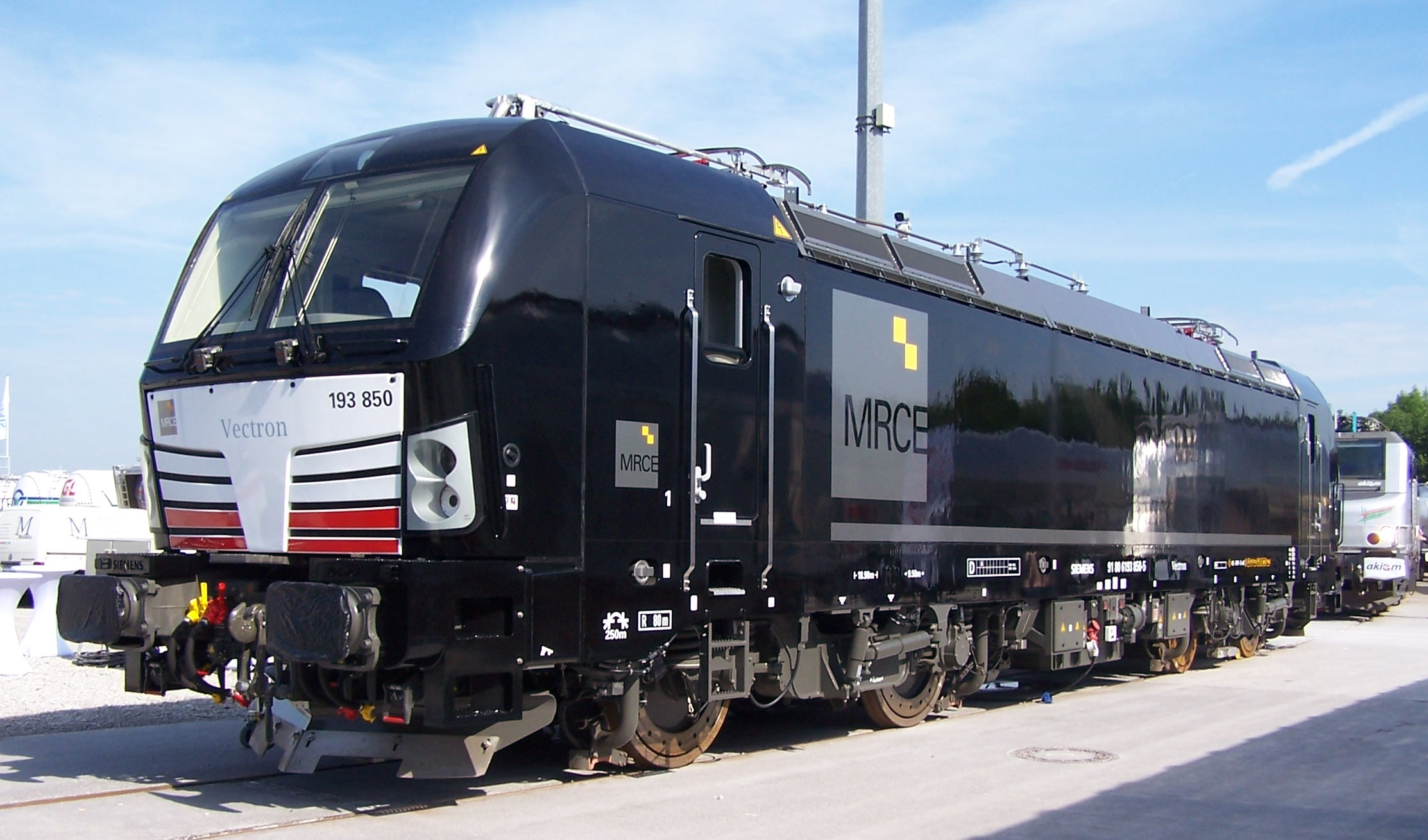
MRCE (Munich, June 2013)

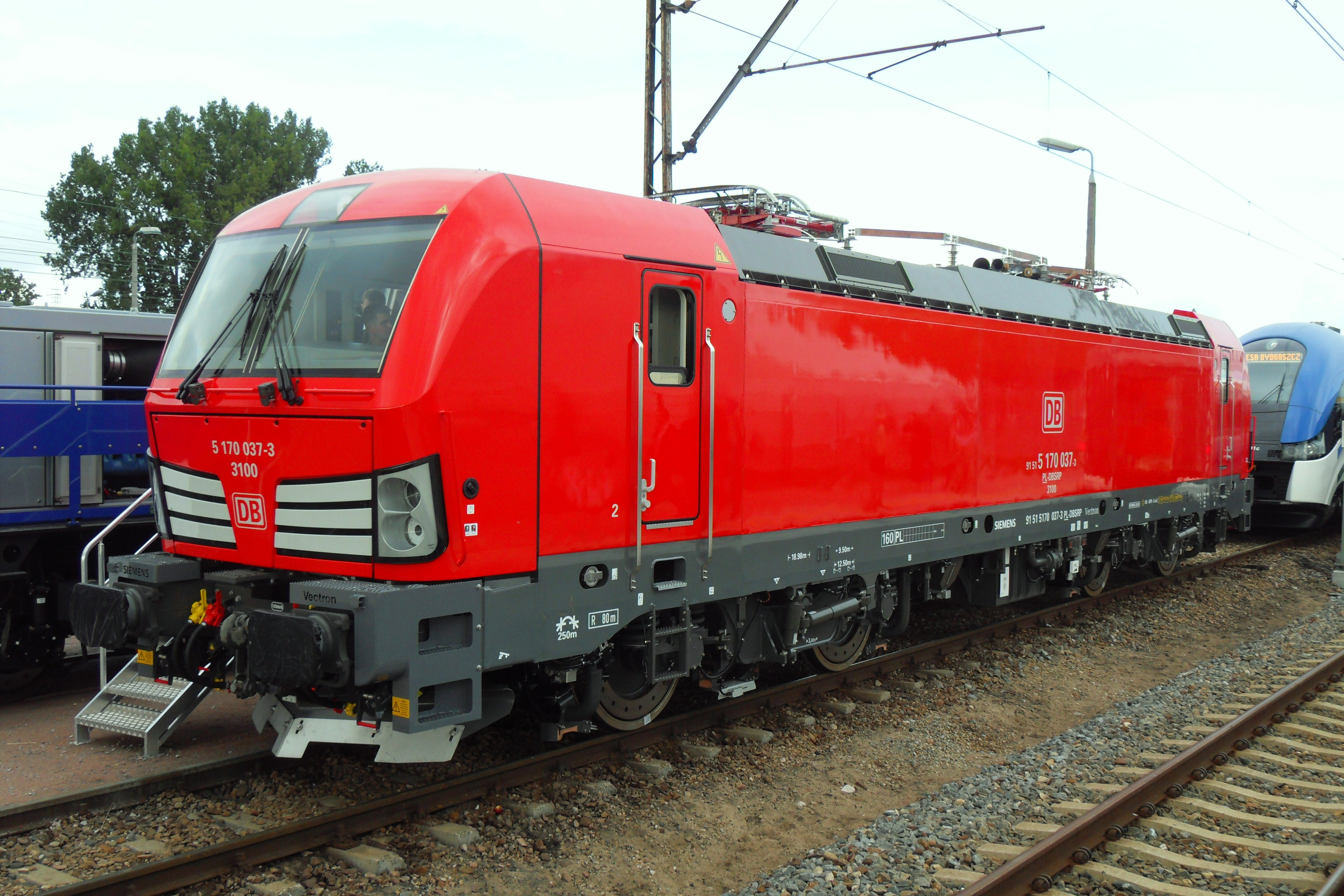
DB Schenker (Poland) (Gdańsk, September 2013)

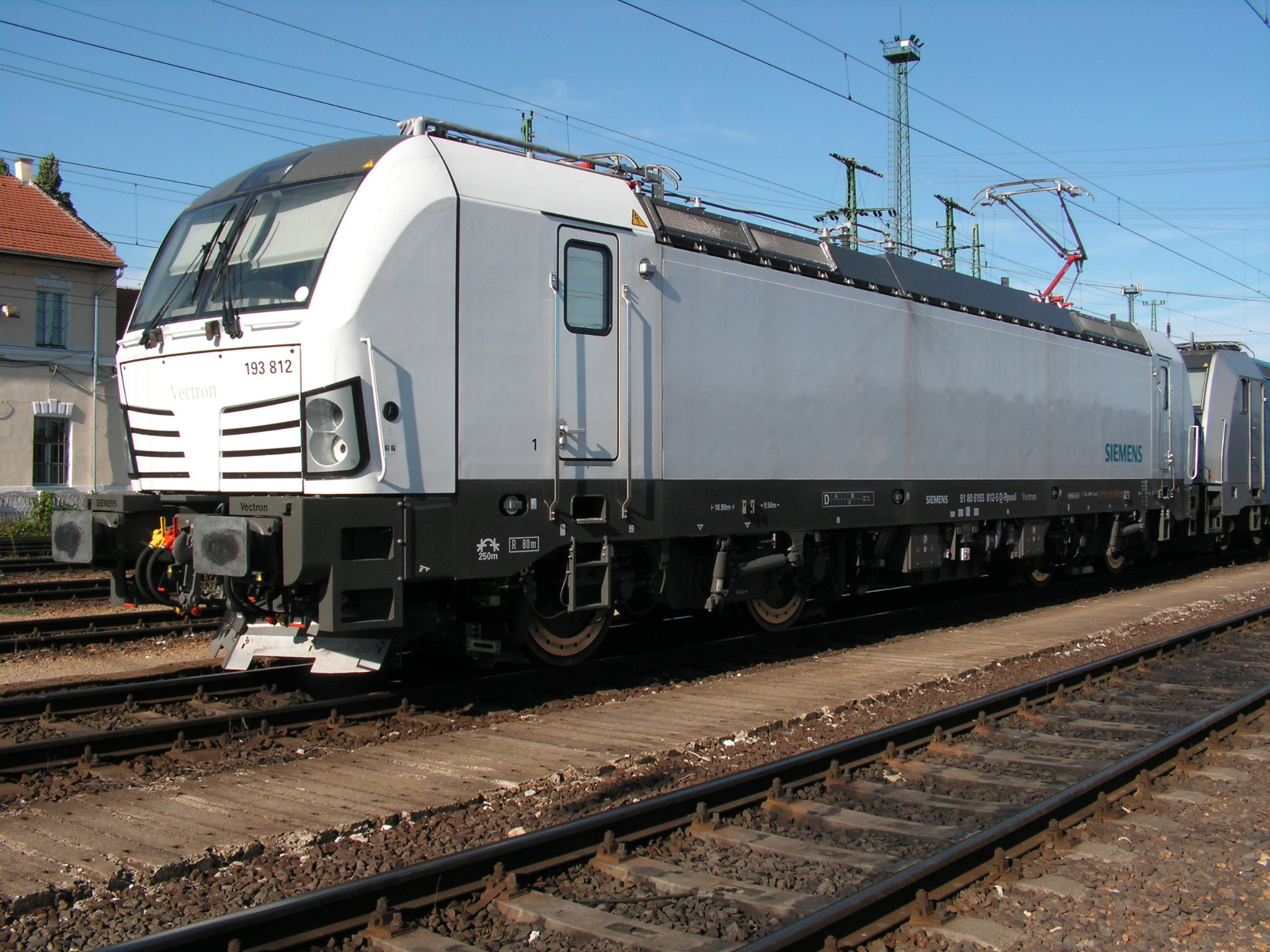
Siemens Vectron (August 2014)

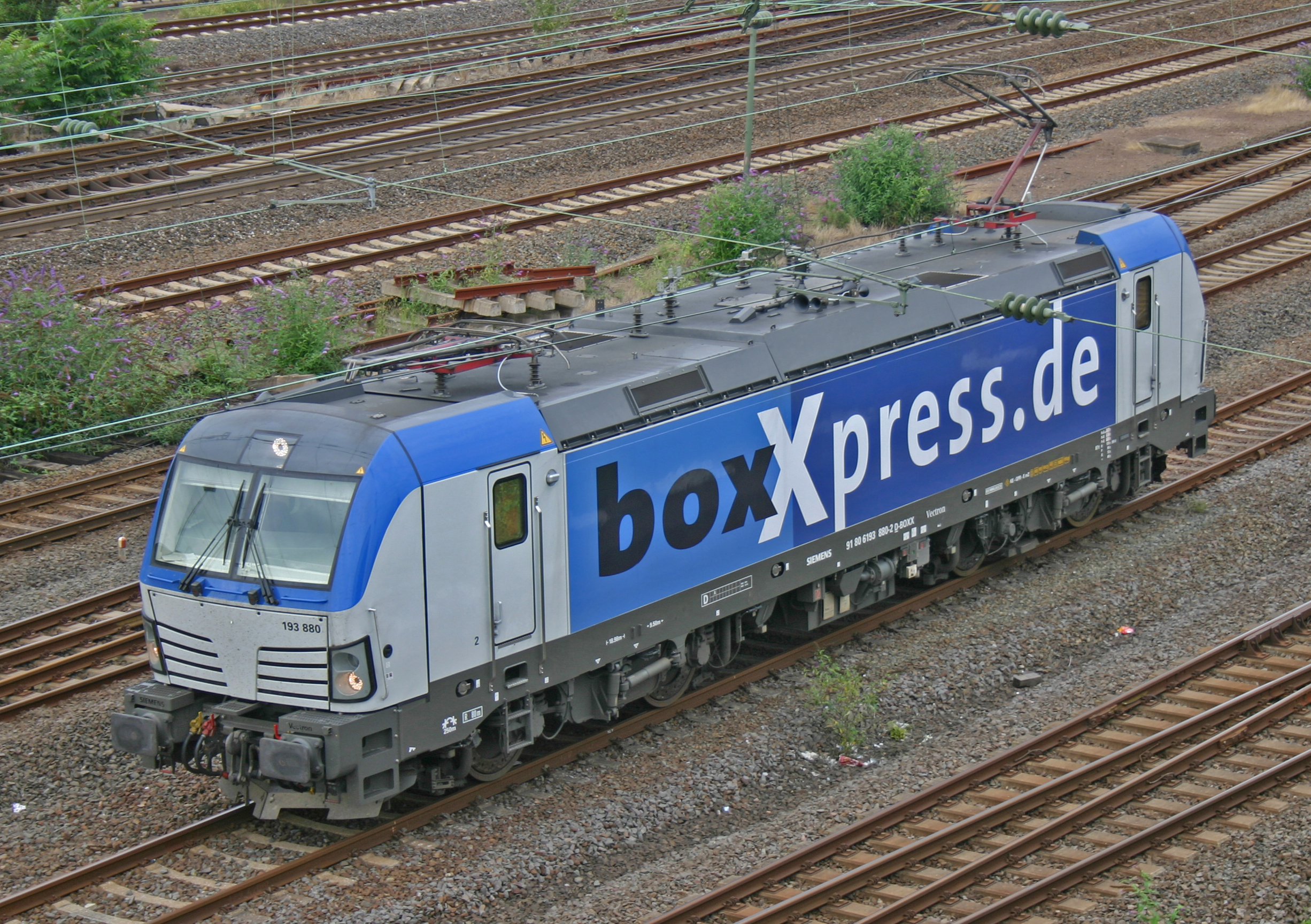
BoxXpress Vectron, (Essen, July 2013)

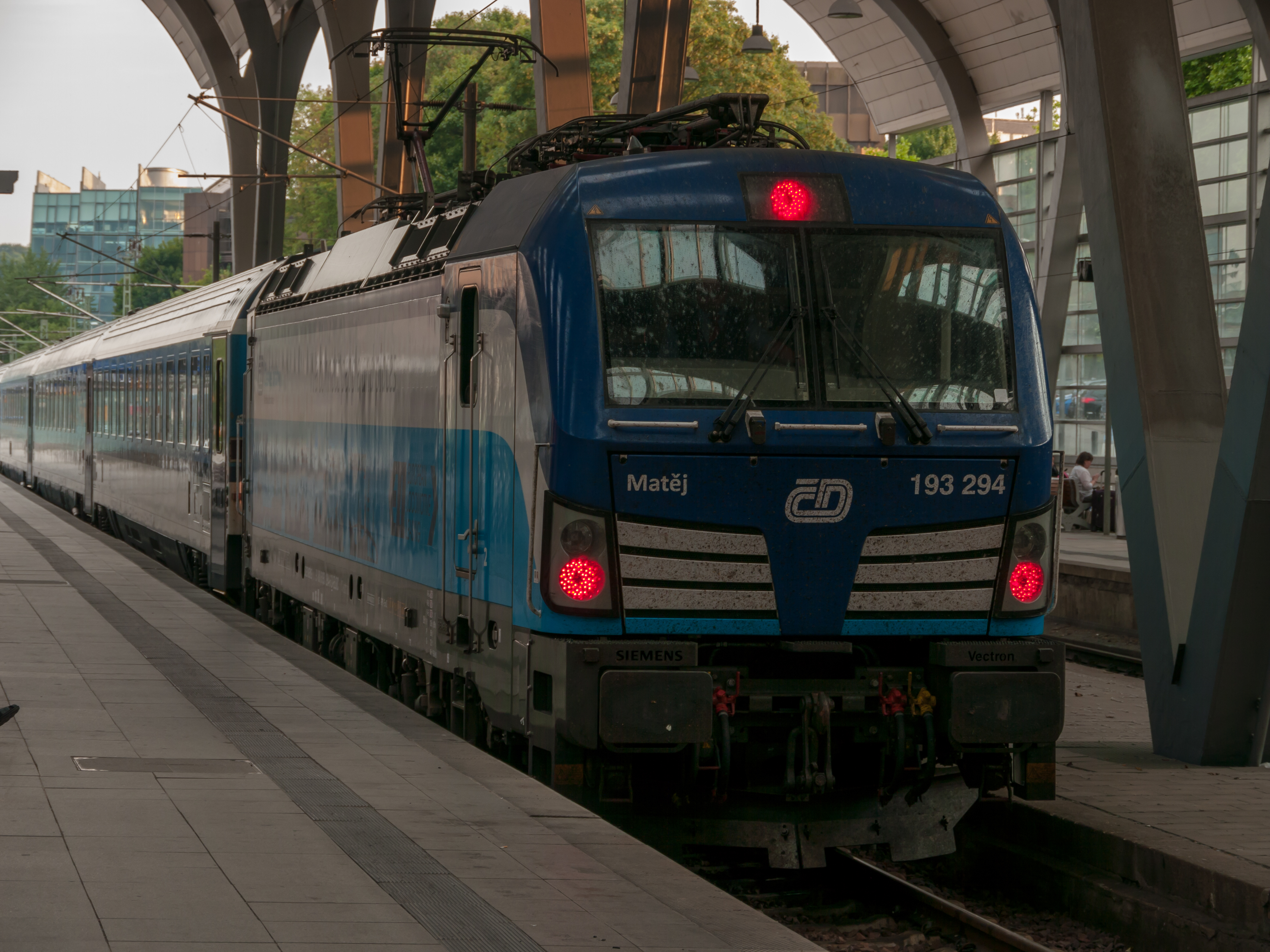
České dráhy (Kiel, July 2018)

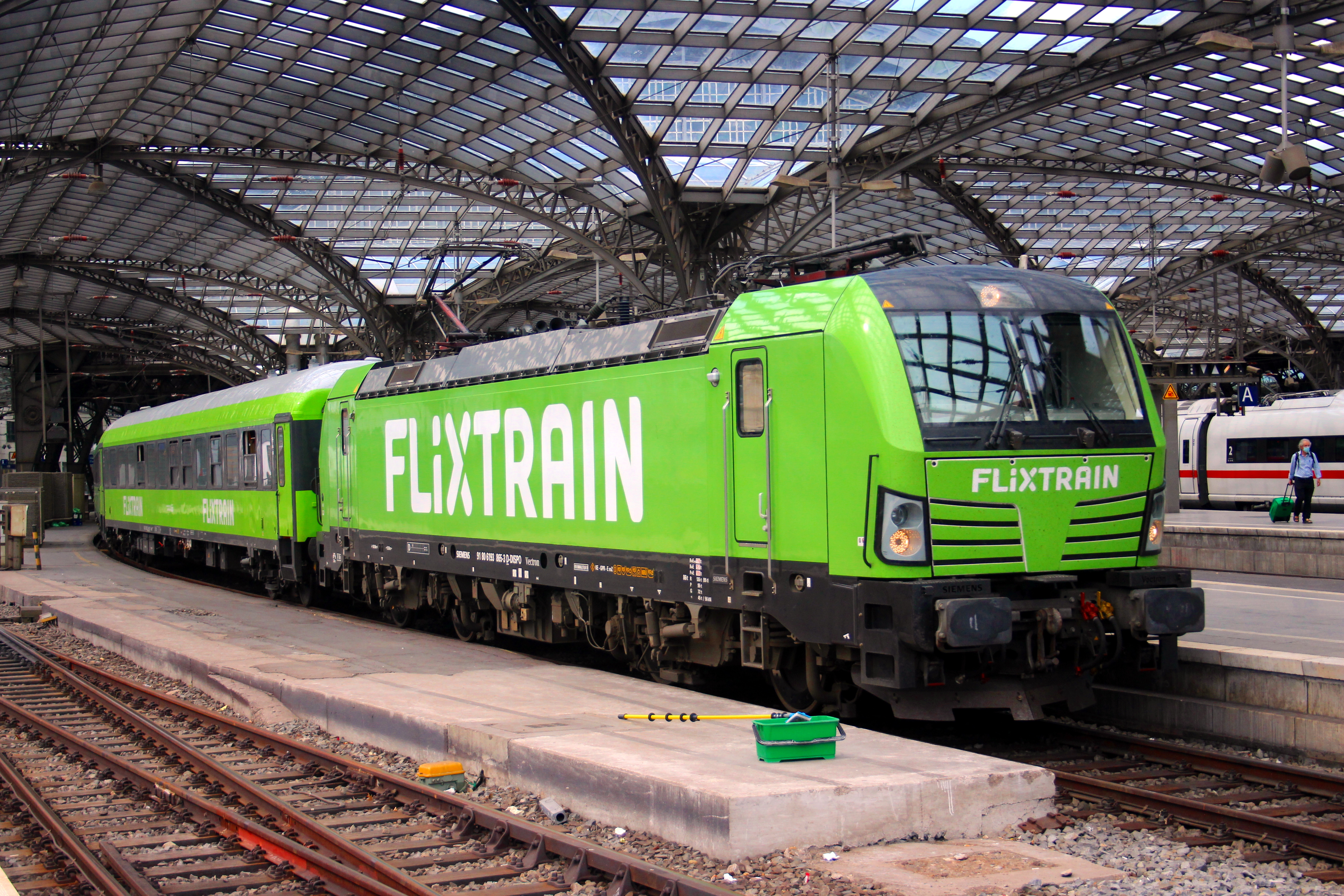
Vectron in Flixtrain livery (Köln Hbf, Cologne, August 2020)

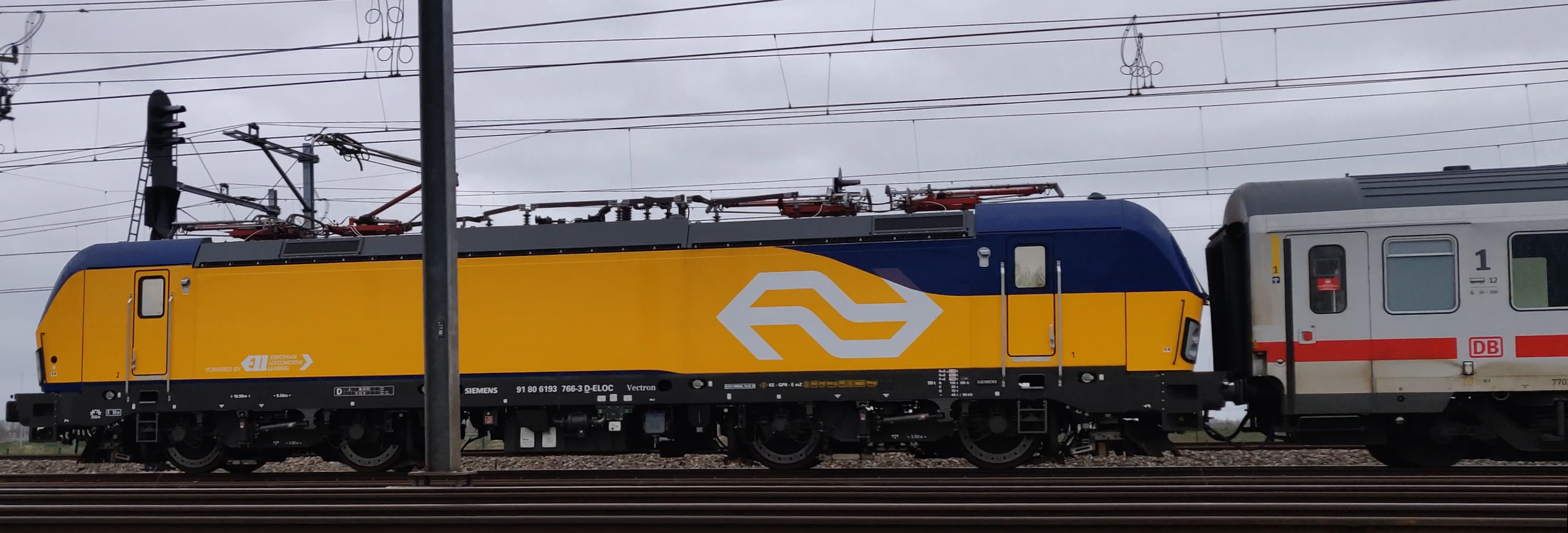
A Siemens Vectron in NS livery and with four pantographs (April 2021)

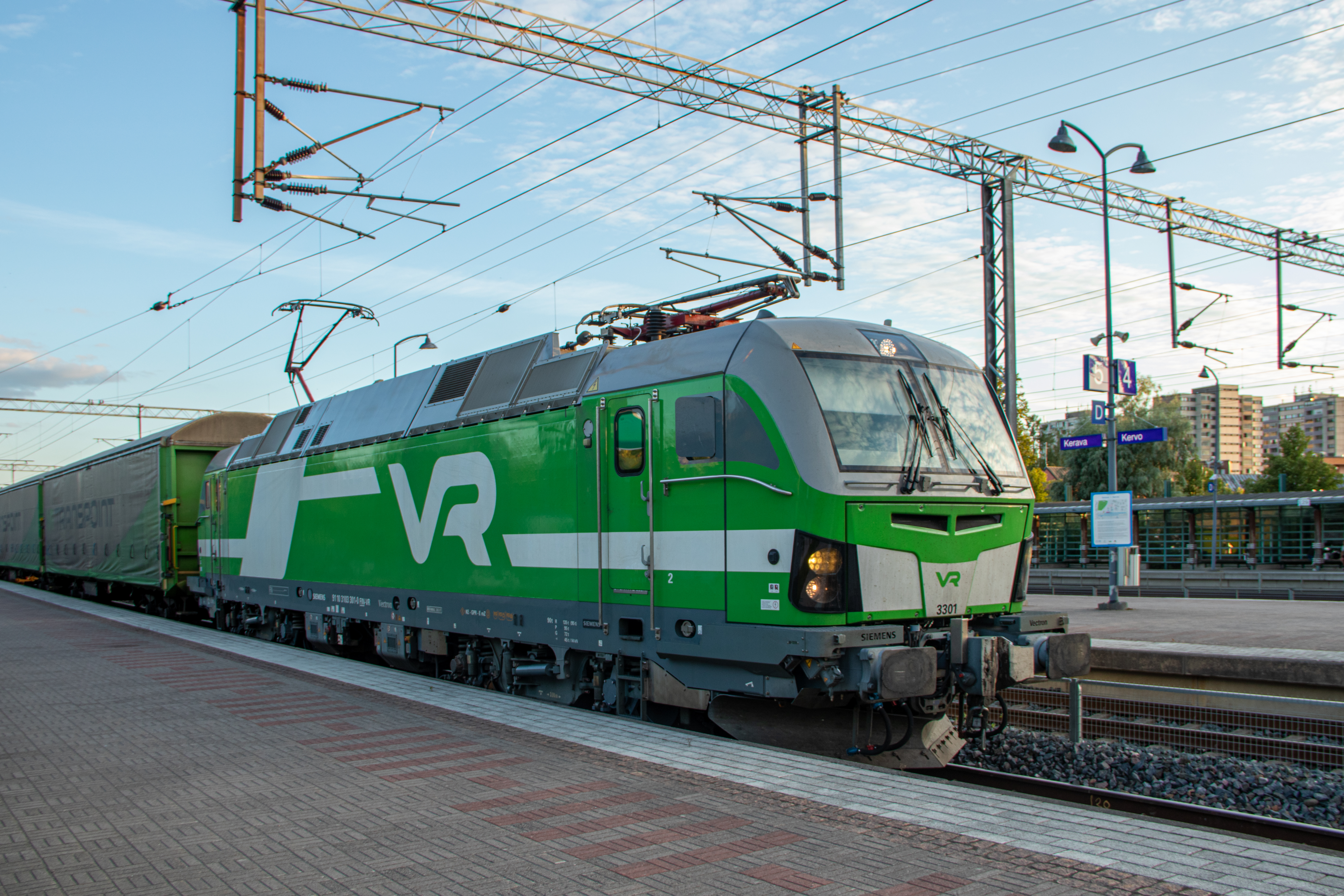
A Finnish Vectron Sr3 3301 at Kerava station in 2021. Note hump on the roof, lack of front air intakes and SA3 coupler

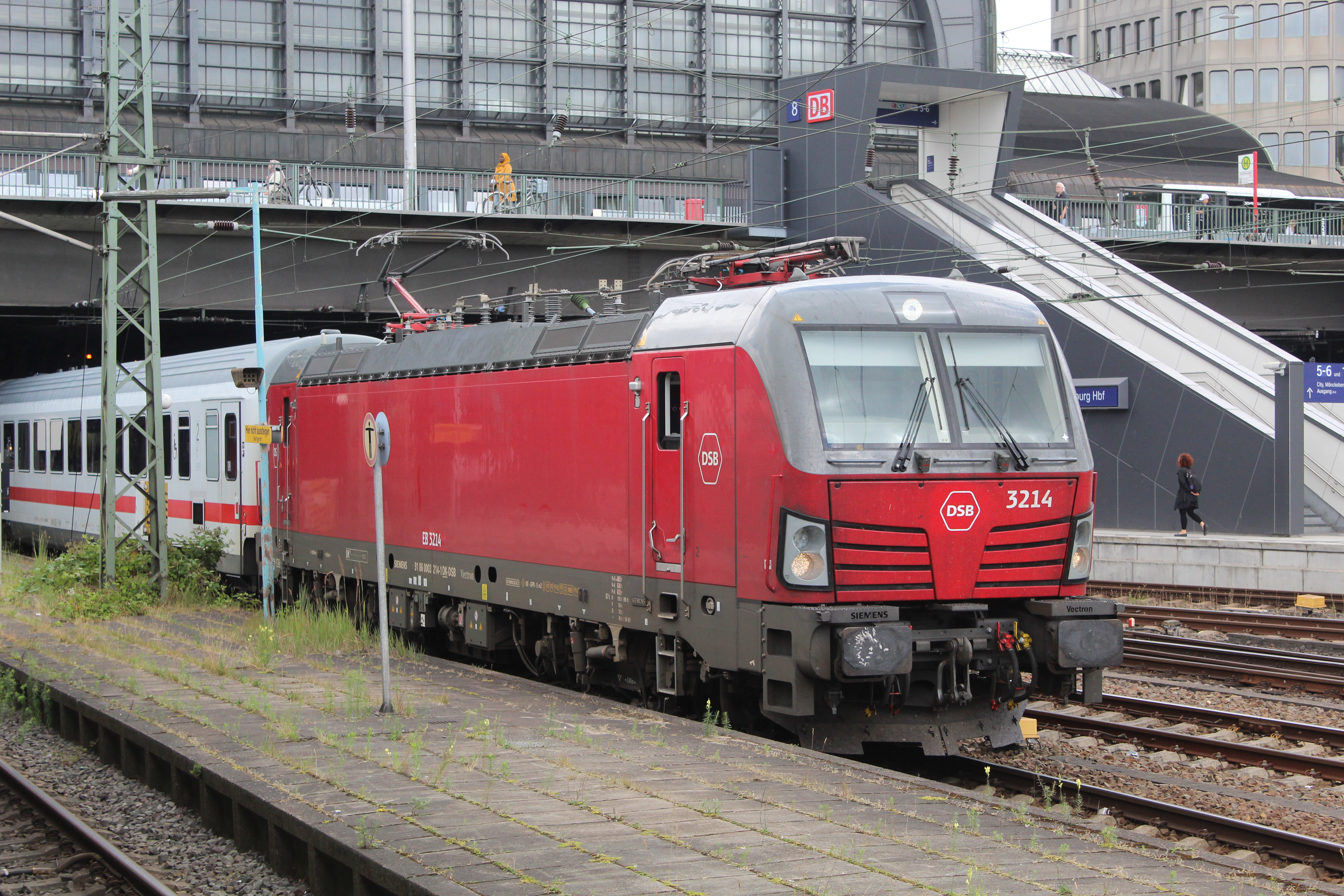
DSB EB 3214, (Hamburg Hbf, July 2023)

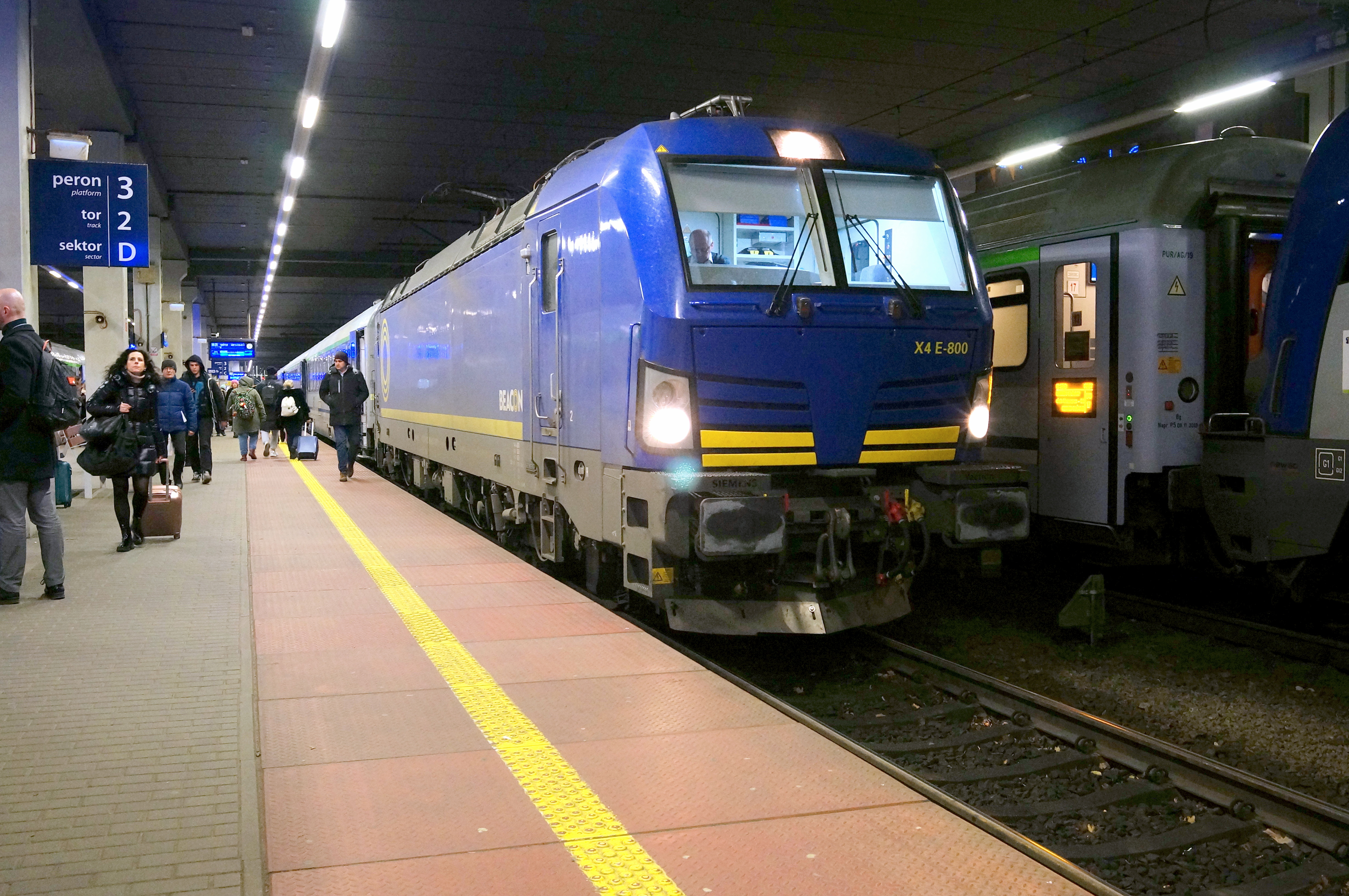
Beacon Vectron X4E (Poznań, December 2024)

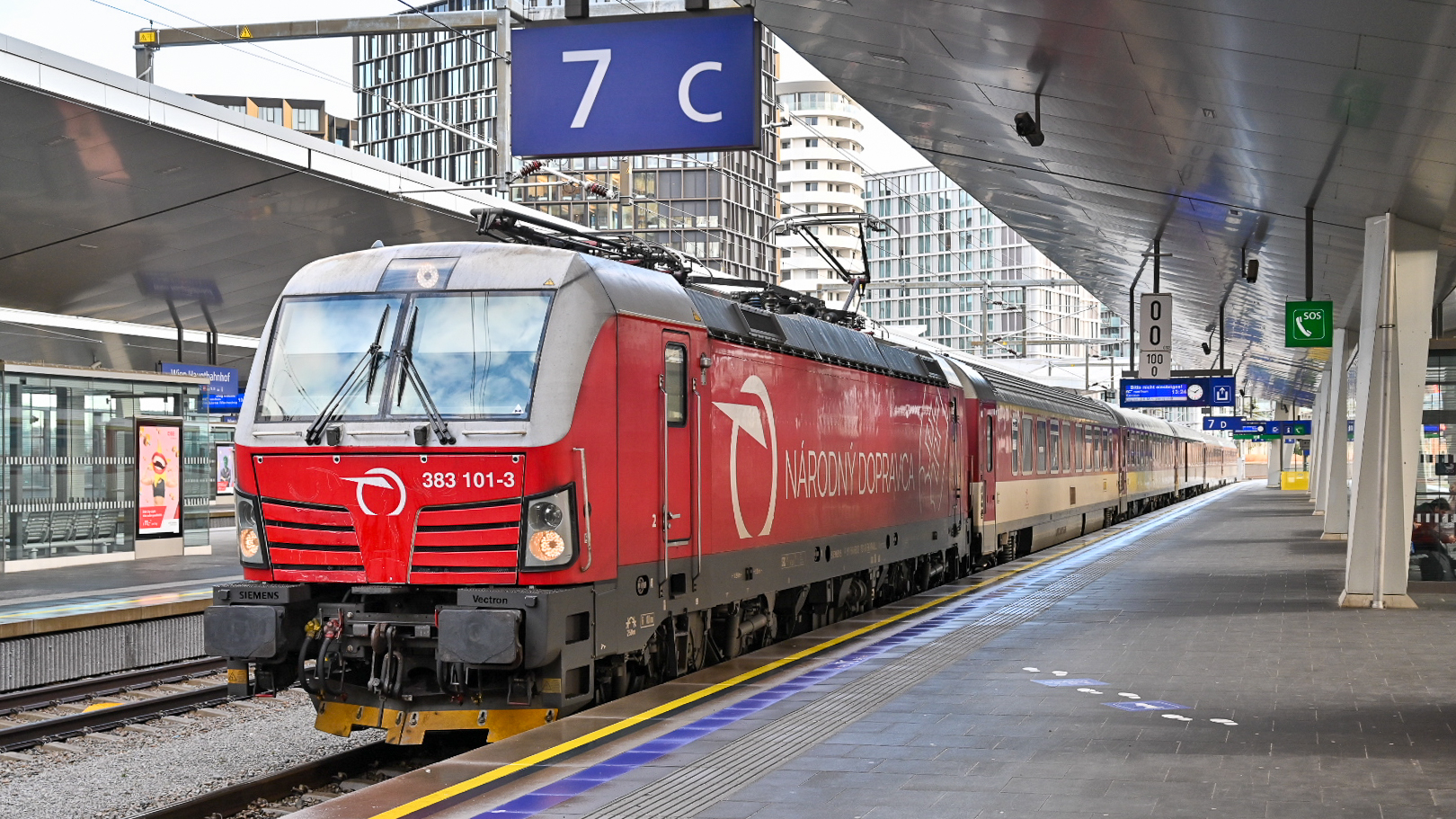
Železničná spoločnosť Slovensko in Vienna

== See also ==
- Amtrak Cities Sprinter, Siemens' electric locomotive for the North American market deriving from Eurosprinter and Vectron designs.
- List of České dráhy locomotive classes
- Charger, Siemens' diesel locomotive for North America based on the ACS-64 and Vectron.
