= Metrans Rail =

Czech railway cargo company

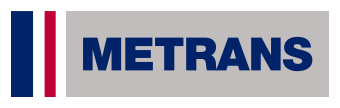

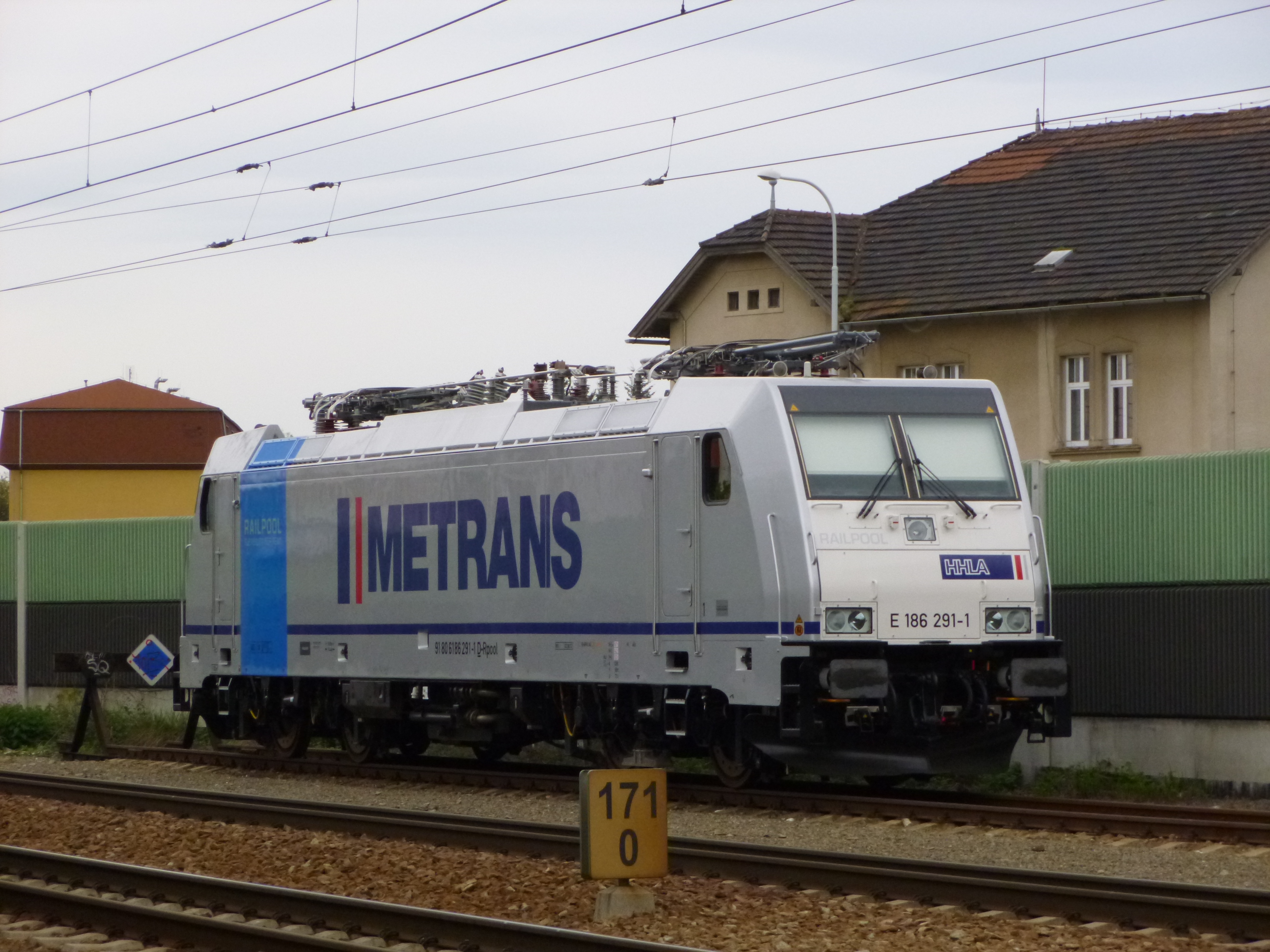
- Industry: Rail transport
- Founded: August 27, 2003
- Founder: Petr Šimral, Radan Stift
- Headquarters: Prague, Czech Republic
- Revenue: ▲CZK 1,328 mio. (2015)
- Operating income: 103,635,000 Czech koruna (2016)
- Net income: ▲CZK 134 mio. (2015)
- Total assets: ▲CZK 329 mio. (2015)
- Total equity: ▲CZK 148 mio. (2015)
- Number of employees: ▲203 (2023)
- Parent: HHLA
- Website: MetransRail.eu

Metrans Rail s.r.o. (VKM: MTR) is a Czech railway operator. It operates regular freight trains connecting container terminal of its parent Metrans in Prague-Uhříněves with Rotterdam. It is presently a wholly owned subsidiary of the German logistics company HHLA.

The company was founded as Railtrans by Petr Šimral and Radan Stift in August 2003. Early operations were focused on both irregular freight traffic and open access passenger services. Efforts to launch more passenger services were stymied by a lack of capacity at Prague Main Station and a lack of permissions for the use of its Siemens ES64F4 electric locomotives. In August 2009, Metrans acquired a 50 percent stake in Railtrans; within five years, Metrans had fully acquired the company, after which point the Metrans Rail branding was adopted. By the early 2010s, Metrans has become the dominant intermodal operator in both the Czech Republic and neighboring Slovakia. It routinely operated its own independent trains to various major European ports, including Hamburg, Rotterdam, and Koper. On 6 May 2013, Metrans opened its new container terminal at Česká Třebová, Eastern Bohemia. During the 2010s, Metrans opted to substantially expand the number of locomotives that it directly owned; by December 2017, the company owned 50 mainline locomotives and 17 shunters.

== History ==
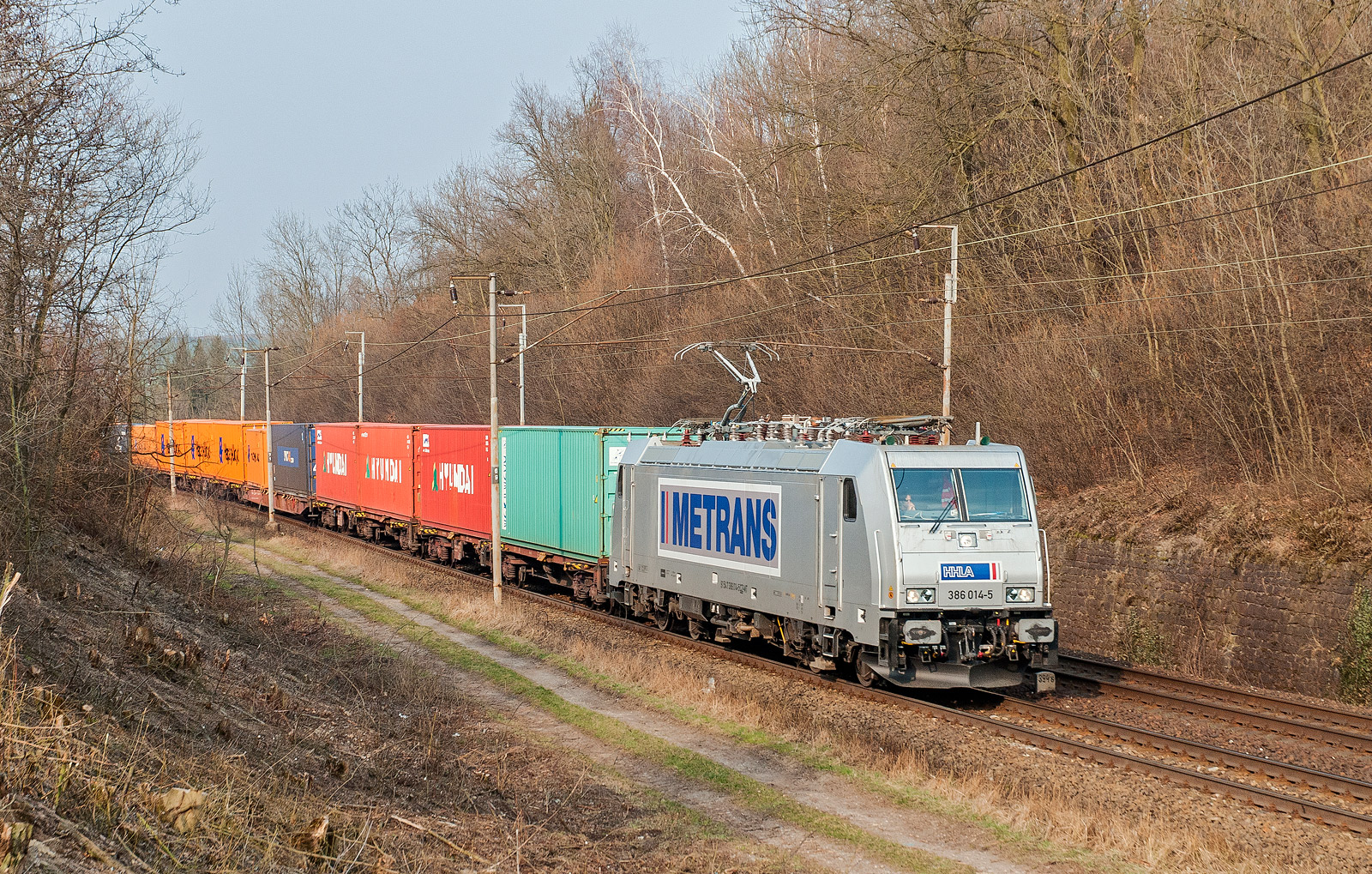
A Metrans freight service, hauled by a Bombardier Traxx locomotive, near Polepy, Czech Republic.

Metrans Rail was originally established under the name Railtrans by Petr Šimral and Radan Stift, a pair of locomotive drivers, in August 2003. At its commencement of operations, it concentrated on irregular freight movements, often running cross-border trains into neighbouring Germany. On 1 September 2004, Railtrans became the first Czech open access operator to offer regular passenger trains between the Czech city of Liberec and the German city of Zittau; this route was served using several Uerdingen railbuses.

During April 2006, Railtrans announced plans to compete with state-owned Czech Railways on the line Prague - Ostrava. Despite being scheduled to do so, it failed to start operations in December 2006 due to the selected Siemens ES64F4 electric locomotives having not received the necessary permissions. Siemens was able to attain approval in December 2011. Railtrans was refused access to Prague Main Station on account of the scheduled reconstruction of the line that had limited capacity to the station; the existing subsidised services of incumbent Czech Railways were given priority over new potential services. During September 2007, Railtrans announced its decision to abandon the project entirely.

In August 2009, Metrans acquired a 50 percent stake in Railtrans. During March 2011, Metrans increased its shareholding to 80 percent; three years later, it became the sole shareholder and the company was renamed Metrans Rail. It has since become a wholly owned subsidiary of the German logistics company HHLA.

On 6 May 2013, Metrans opened its new container terminal at Česká Třebova, Eastern Bohemia; built at a cost of €16.5 million, the facility became the second hub of the company's intermodal operations. Possessing six 630m-long electrified sidings and three gantry cranes, it had sufficient capacity to handle around 150 trains per week travelling to and from destinations such as Austria, Slovakia, and Hungary. By this point, its first terminal in Prague Uhřínĕves had become the largest intermodal facility in the Czech Republic.

By the early 2010s, Metrans has become the dominant intermodal operator in both the Czech Republic and neighboring Slovakia. It routinely operated its own independent trains to various major European ports, including Hamburg, Rotterdam, and Koper. By September 2014, Metrans was reportedly operating up to seven intermodal trains per day in both directions between the port of Hamburg and terminals in Prague and Ceska Trebova in the Czech Republic.

During the early 2020s, Metrans participated in the RailWatch project, a German government-funded scheme to that aims to make rail freight more efficient, cheaper, and safer through the use of data and artificial intelligence to automatically check many of the metrics of every freight wagon while on the move. In late March 2022, as a consequence of a cyber attack upon the IT systems of Ferrovie dello Stato Italiane that caused widespread disruption across Italy's railways, Metrans temporarily suspended all of its Italian operations.

== Rolling stock ==
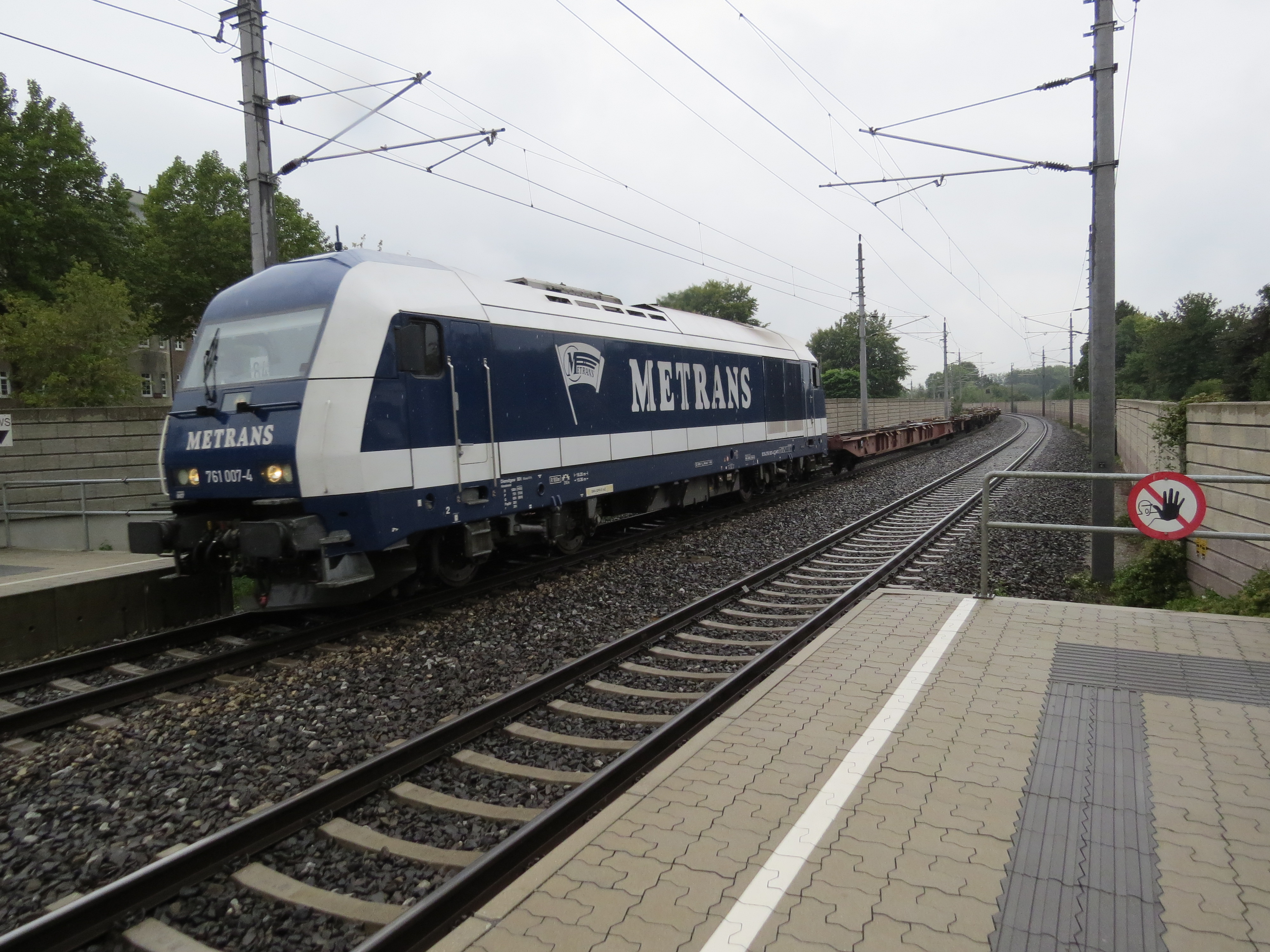
A Metrans train passing through Melk, Austria

During 2005, the company acquired a pair of V100 Ost diesel locomotives. By 2010, Metrans Rail was operating Bombardier Traxx F 140MS electric locomotives alongside Siemens ER20 diesel locomotives. During September 2012, Metrans ordered a further three Eurorunner locomotives from Siemens Mobility. During September 2014, the first of an order for 20 Traxx MS locomotives was delivered to Metrans by Bombardier Transportation; the new fleet was intended for use on its intermodal services from Hamburg and Bremerhaven to the Czech Republic, Slovakia and Hungary, and were envisioned as reducing the company's operating costs.

In February 2016, Metrans awarded Alstom a contract for two Prima H3 hybrid locomotives; they will be used for shunting and are expected operate between 50 and 75 percent of the time purely on battery power. In December 2017, Metrans ordered ten additional Traxx MS locomotives; by this point, the company reportedly owned 50 mainline locomotives and 17 shunters. During November 2019, Metrans Rail accepted delivery of the first of ten Siemens Vectron locomotives for its transnational freight services across central and eastern Europe; accordingly, they are certified to operate in Austria, the Czech Republic, Germany, Hungary, Poland, Slovakia and Slovenia with the corresponding national signalling apparatus in addition to ETCS equipment.
