= Railpool =

Rolling stock leasing company

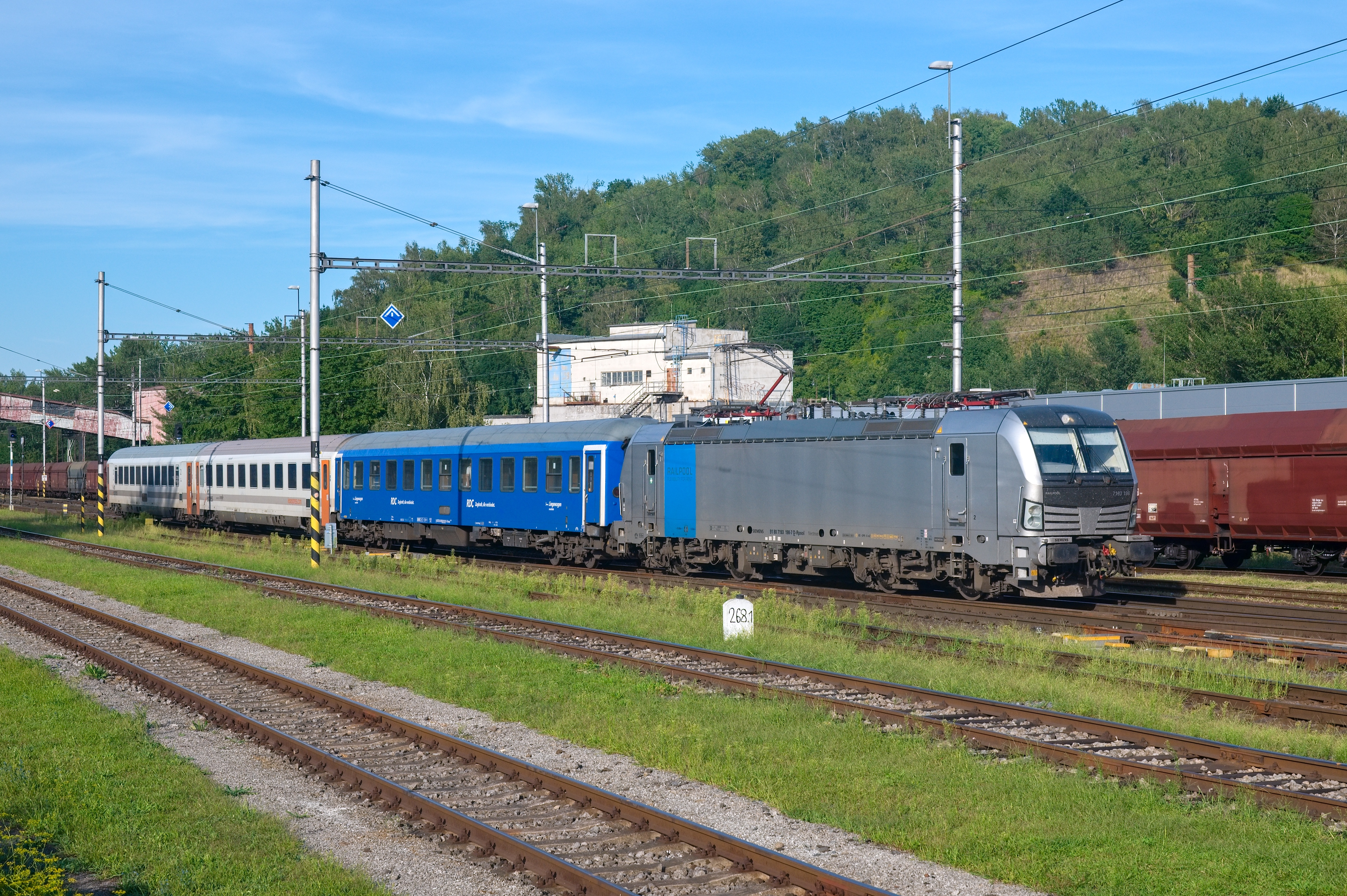
- Railpool Vectron in passenger service
- Industry: Rail transport leasing (Europe)
- Founded: 2008; 18 years ago
- Headquarters: Munich, Germany
- Area served: Europe
- Key people: CEO Torsten Lehnert, CFO Ingo Wurzer
- Owner: Oaktree Capital Management
- Number of employees: 300+
- Subsidiaries: Railpool Lokservice
- Website: railpool.eu

Railpool is a European rolling stock leasing company based in Germany, which owns over 500 locomotives and provides them to several train operators along with various services. Originally founded by two German banks to handle a Bombardier/DSB deal, since the 2010s Railpool is owned by Oaktree and GIC and is funded by loans from various European banks.

== History ==
During August 2008, Railpool was established as a joint venture between HSH Nordbank and KfW IPEX-Bank to offer passenger and freight locomotive and rolling stock financing and leasing, in addition to advice and other services, to the European rail market. In October of that year, Railpool entered the passenger rolling stock leasing market via a €75m order for 45 Bombardier double-deck coaches, which it arranged to lease to the Danish state railway DSB.

In September 2008, Railpool placed a €192m order for 58 Bombardier TRAXX with the multinational rolling stock manufacturer Bombardier Transportation. During August 2017, the company ordered 20 more TRAXX locomotives During December 2020, Railpool had taken delivery of the 200th TRAXX locomotive, the company being one of the largest TRAXX operators in the world by that time, having ordered nearly 10 per cent of the global TRAXX fleet. That same month, it was announced that Bombardier Transportation and Railpool have signed a contract for 73 of Railpool’s TRAXX MS2 locomotives to be outfitted with the European Train Control System (ETCS) Baseline 3 upgrade. In January 2022, 15 additional TRAXX locomotives were ordered, which are intended for use in Norway, Sweden and Italy.

During November 2012, Railpool took delivery of its first Siemens Vectron locomotive. In August 2021, the company agreed the purchase of 20 Vectron MS locomotives from Siemens Mobility, built for service in the countries of Germany, Austria, Poland, Croatia, Czechia, Slovakia, Slovenia, Hungary, Bulgaria, Romania and Serbia along the Eastern Corridor. Upon the completion of this order, the company had an inventory of 53 Siemens locomotives. In January 2022, Railpool and Siemens signed a framework agreement for the delivery of 100 locomotives of various types. These locomotives are intended for use on several European rail corridors (north-south and east-west), and thus have been designed to be operated in up to 18 countries, being fitted with the required national train control systems and the European Train Control System.

During May 2014, it was announced that Railpool was being acquired by the global asset management company Oaktree Capital Management from its former owners, HSH Nordbank and KfW IPEX-Bank. Two years later, the sovereign wealth fund of Singapore GIC took up a 49% stake in Railpool alongside Oaktree. During April 2019, a fund managed by Palladio Partners acquired a 25% stake in Railpool from Oaktree.

During April 2018, the Paribus Group sold its Northrail Technical Service locomotive maintenance division to Railpool. In March 2021, Railpool took over the Hamburg-based locomotive maintenance company Ajax Loktechnik; rebranded as the subsidiary Railpool Lokservice, it performs maintenance and overhaul for Railpool's own locomotives as well as for non-leasing customers at their facilities in Hamburg Billbrook and Altenwerder.. During July 2021, Railpool acquired the Duisburg-based maintenance company KTG Railservice, increasing Railpool's German-based workshops to three in the process.

During the late 2010s, Railpool adopted BE-terna's cloud-based enterprise resource planning solution Infor M3 to manage its service and rental processes. In November 2020, the firm established a new subsidiary to serve the Italian market.

In January 2021, it was announced that four banks, KfW IPEX-Bank, ABN AMRO Bank, Crédit Agricole Corporate and Investment Bank, and ING Bank, were providing a total of €150 million of financing towards Railpool's acquisition of new rolling stock; this was planned to be spent across a seven year timeframe. At the time of the announcement, the company had in excess of 400 electric locomotives, valued above €1 billion, already in its portfolio, and was established as one of the largest locomotive leasing providers in the European market. During May 2022, Railpool closed a new €1.07bn debt package from Crédit Agricole CIB, which includes a Green €500m European Private Placement (EuroPP) along with 12 year and 20 year amortizing notes to fund orders for rolling stock.

As of 2026, Railpool owned around 600 electric locomotives and had an outstanding order for up to 250 Siemens Vectron locomotives, including multisystem variants usable in 16 countries.

== Assets ==
600 electric locomotives, including:

- 36 x Bombardier TRAXX F140 MS electric locomotives
- 6 x Siemens Vectron electric locomotives - Railpool was the first buyer.
- 45 x Bombardier Double-deck Coaches (4th generation DB class) for DSB.

Configuration	Quantity	Class 185.2 Serials
D/A/HU	11	185 672–673, 676–677, 680, 681, 684,690-691,716-717
D/A/S/N	21	185 671,674-675,678-679,682-683,685-689,692-700
S/N	12	185 704-715

Configuration	Quantity	Class 186 Serials
D/A/B/NL	23	186 181–183, 187, 292–297, 421–428, 455–459
D/A/B/NL/CZ/SK	3	186 298-300
D/A/B/NL/CZ/SK/HU	3	186 182,289,291
D/A/CH/I/NL	11	186 001–010, 251
D/A/CH/I/B/NL	34	186 256–259, 445–454, 491–510
D/A/I	9	186 281–288, 290
D/A/PL	13	186 141–147, 271–276
D/A/PL/NL/CZ/SK/HU	14	186 438,530-540,551-552
D/B/F	4	186 252–255

Configuration	Quantity	Class 187 Serials
D/A/CH	9	187 001-009
D/A/HU/RO	22	187 300–316,340-344
S/N	8	187 400-407

Configuration	Quantity	Class 193 Serials
D/A	6	193 801-806
D/A/HU/RO	23	193 810–817,824-828,990-999

== See also ==
- European Locomotive Leasing
