= DBAG Class 145 and 146 =

Two related classes of German electric locomotives

DBAG Class 145 DBAG Class 146 also SBB Re481, MThB Re486
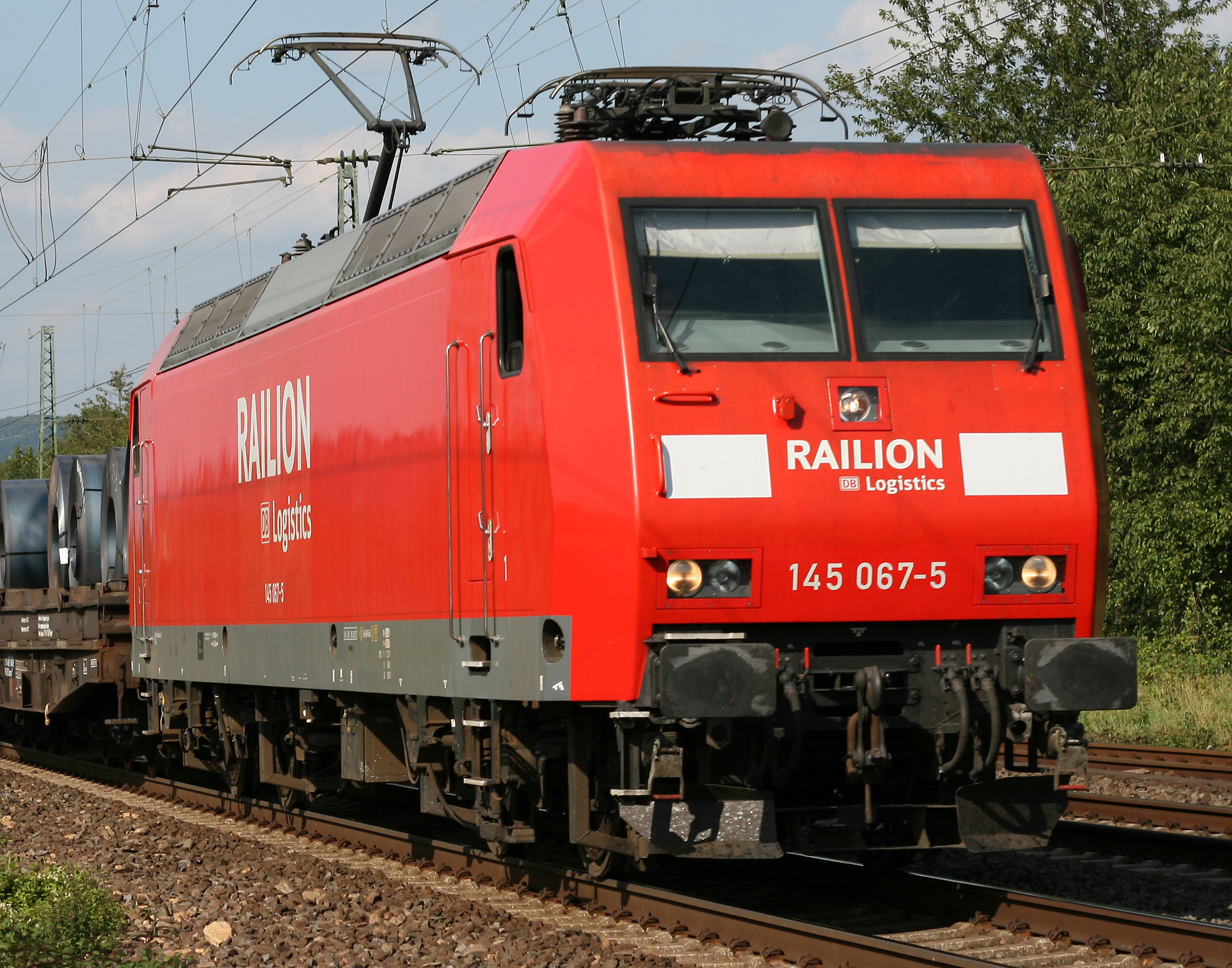
- DBAG Class 145, with Railion branding
Type and origin
- Power type: Electric
- Builder: Adtranz
- Serial number: Freight versions: Germany: DBAG Class 145 001 to 145 080 others - see text Switzerland: MThB Re486 651 to Re486 656 (up to 2002); SBB Cargo Re481 001 to Re481 006 (up to 2005) (Note: The locomotives were only fitted for operations in Germany, not Switzerland. They were replaced by SBB Re482 (Bombardier TRAXX) units between 2003-5 and sold to MRCE in 2005) Passenger versions: Germany: DBAG Class 146 001 to 146 031
- Build date: 1997-2002
- Total produced: Freight versions:103 Passenger versions:31
Specifications
- Configuration
  - UIC: Bo′Bo′
- Gauge: 1,435 mm (4 ft 8 1/2 in)
- Length: 18.900 m (62 ft 0.1 in)
- Loco weight: Freight version:80t Passenger version:82t
- Electric system/s: 15 kV AC Catenary
- Current pickup: Pantograph
- Traction motors: BAZu 8871/4i
Performance figures
- Maximum speed: Freight version: 140 km/h (87 mph); Passenger version: 160 km/h (99 mph)
- Power output: 4.2 MW (5,632 hp)
- Tractive effort: 300 kN (67,443 lb_{f})
- Brakeforce: 150 kN (33,721 lb_{f})

The DBAG Class 145 and DBAG Class 146 are Bo-Bo mainline electric locomotives built by Adtranz primarily for the Deutsche Bahn at the end of the 1990s. The Class 145 is the freight version for DB Cargo; the Class 146 is the passenger version for DB Regio. Additional freight machines were built for the former Swiss railway Mittelthurgaubahn as well as for various private operators and leasing companies.

The classes of locomotives are predecessors of the Bombardier TRAXX locomotives.

== Background and design ==
The AdTranz DBAG Class 145 derives from the prototype locomotive 128 001 (also known as 12X) (see DBAG Class 128) that was built by AEG and Henschel; like competitor Krauss-Maffei’s 127 001 (See EuroSprinter), it uses asynchronous electric motors to drive the locomotive: based on experiences gained from DB Class 120.

== Orders and operators ==
=== Freight versions ===
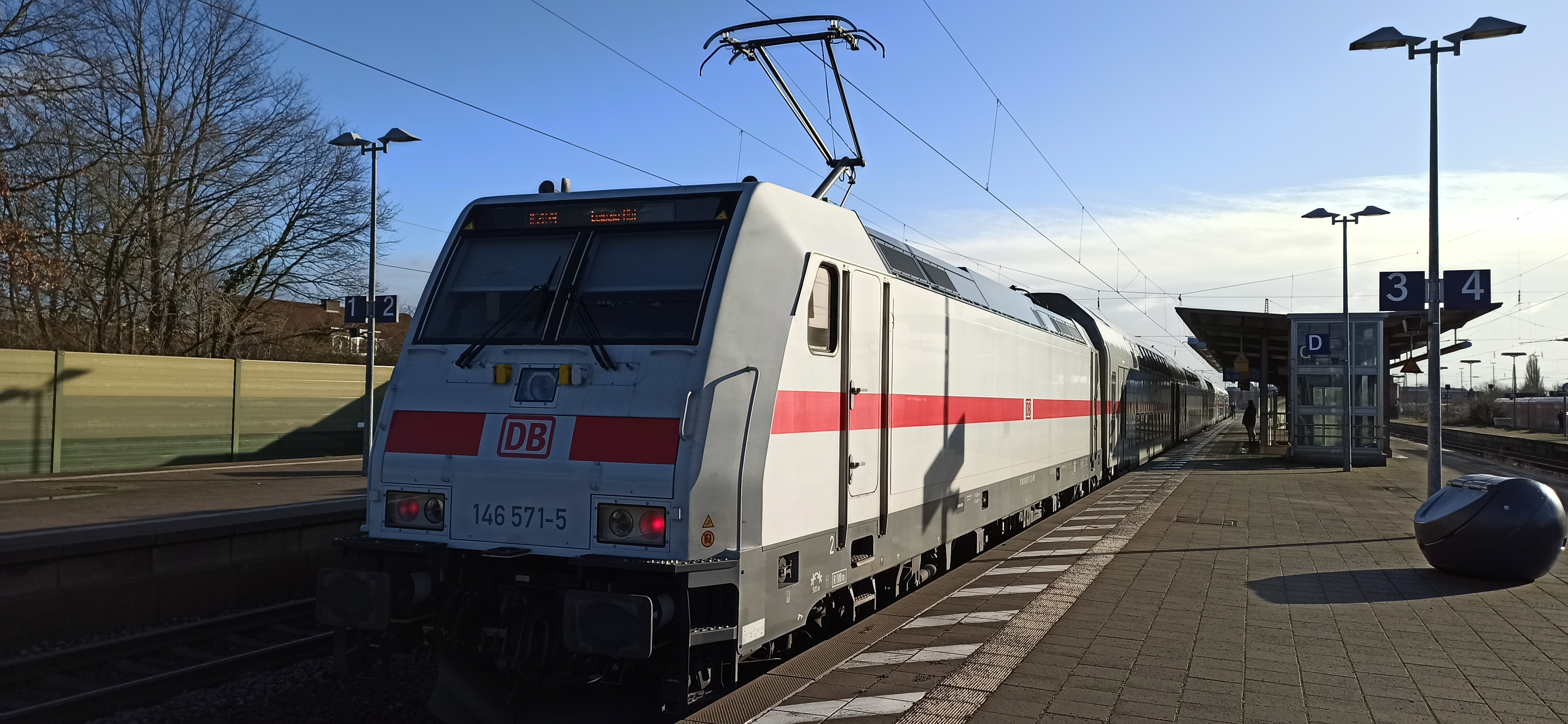
A DB Class 146 loco

The prototype resulted in an order from DB AG for eighty locomotives for medium-weight freight trains. These locomotives were delivered starting in 1997. By the end of production in 2000, 80 locomotives had been produced; built for DB Cargo. Later the locomotives were inherited by the successor organisations Railion followed by DB Schenker.

A further six units were built for the Swiss private railway the Mittelthurgaubahn in 2000 where they were designated Re 486; after the company's bankruptcy in 2002 the locomotives were sold to SBB Cargo, working as Re 481. The locomotives were not homologated for operations in Switzerland - only Germany - being operated by the Swiss federal railways' German subsidiary. This continued until 2005 when they were sold to the leasing company MRCE and subsequently operated for various private operators in Germany.

17 further units were produced between 1999 and 2001 for various private operators and leasing companies; including five for CBrail, six for Locomotion Capital (now Alpha Trains), two for Rail4chem (via leasing company Deutsche Leasing) and others.

=== Passenger versions ===
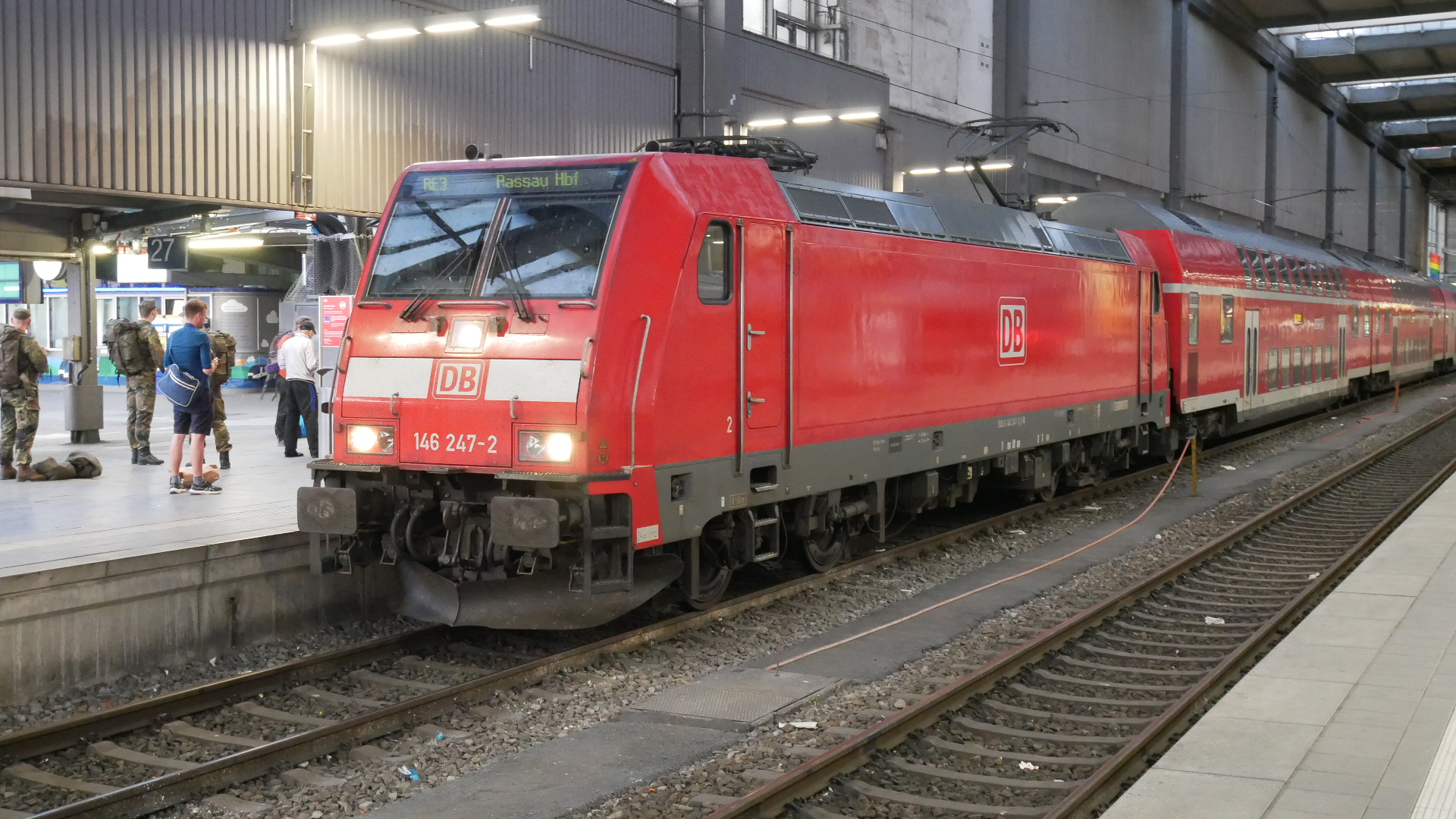
DB 146 247 departing Munich Hauptbahnhof with a Regional Express train

Between 2000 and 2001, a development for passenger trains with hollow shaft final drive replacing the axle hung drive and a higher top speed of 160 km/h (99 mph) was produced for DB Regio. These locomotives were given the designation DBAG Class 146. An additional 32 were ordered in August 2012.
