= Class 28 =

Class 28 may refer to:

- Belgian Railways Class 28 (Baume-Marpent), Belgian electric locomotive introduced in 1950
- Belgian Railways Class 28 (Bombardier), Belgian electric locomotive introduced in 2007
- British Rail Class 28 "Metrovick", British diesel-electric locomotive
- L&YR Class 28, British 0-6-0 steam locomotive
- Rio Grande class K-28

== See also ==
- Type 28 (disambiguation)
