= DBAG Class 128 =

DBAG Class 128 AEG/Adtranz/Bombardier 12X
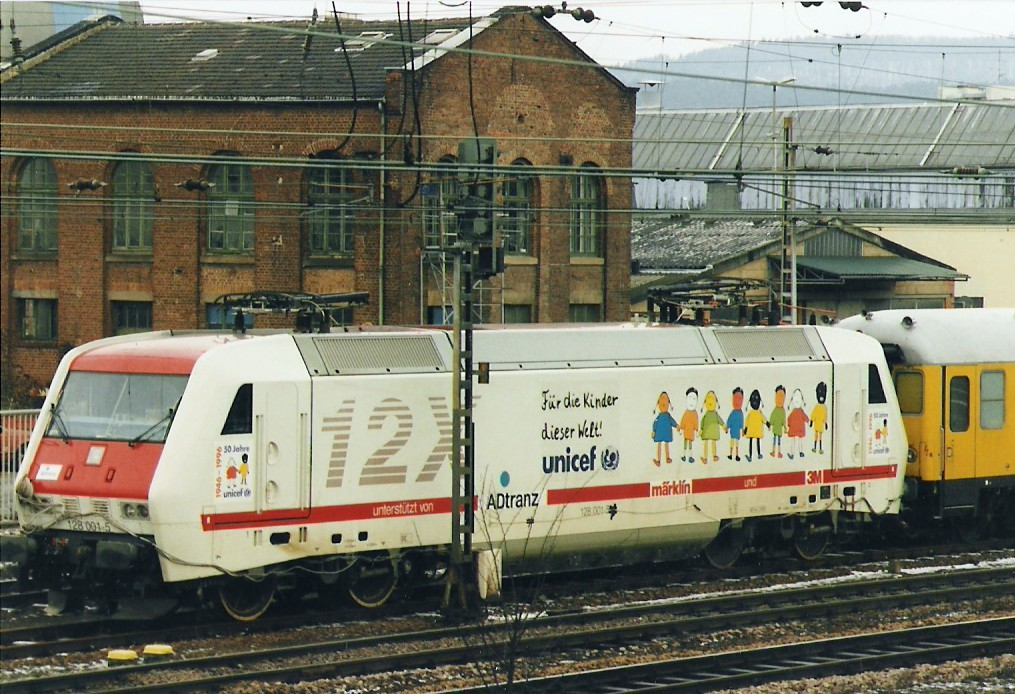
- 128 001 in UNICEF special livery in 1996.
Type and origin
- Power type: Electric
- Builder: AEG Schienenfahrzeuge
- Serial number: 22500
- Model: 12X
- Build date: 1994
- Total produced: 1
- Rebuilder: Adtranz
- Rebuild date: 1998
Specifications
- Configuration
  - UIC: Bo′Bo′
- Gauge: 1,435 mm (4 ft 8 1/2 in) standard gauge
- Wheel diameter: new: 1,250 mm (49.2 in) worn: 1,170 mm (46.1 in)
- Wheelbase: in bogie: 2,600 mm (102.4 in)
- Length: 19,500 mm (767.7 in)
- Axle load: 21 tonnes (23 short tons)
- Loco weight: 85.9 t (94.7 short tons)
- Electric system/s: original: 15 kV/16.7 Hz AC catenary after reconstruction: 15 kV/16.7 Hz and 25 kV/50 Hz AC catenary
- Current pickup: pantograph
- Traction motors: three-phase asynchronous induction motors type: AEG BAZu 8881/4 rating: 1,840 kW (2,470 hp)
- Loco brake: regenerative, wheel tread
Performance figures
- Maximum speed: achieved in tests: 283 km/h (176 mph) design: 250 km/h (155 mph) service: 220 km/h (137 mph)
- Power output: continuous: 6.4 MW (8,600 hp) short-term: 7.2 MW (9,700 hp)
- Tractive effort: starting: 300 kN (67,400 lbf) continuous up to 90 km/h (56 mph): 250 kN (56,200 lbf)
- Brakeforce: regenerative: 250 kN (56,200 lbf)
Career
- Operators: AEG, Deutsche Bahn (lease), Adtranz, BLS (lease), DB Cargo (lease), BASF (lease), Bombardier Transportation
- Class: 128 001-5
- Official name: 12X
- Current owner: Bombardier Transportation

128 001, as registered at Deutsche Bahn, or 12X, as named by its manufacturer AEG Schienenfahrzeuge and its successive owners ADtranz and Bombardier Transportation, is an experimental high-performance electric locomotive built in 1994, which was operated as testbed and test locomotive until 2010. The design of the locomotive featured several technological innovations, including power electronics using new types of semiconductors and water cooling, a new final drive concept, a new bogie concept, and protruding windflaps for improved aerodynamics that gave the locomotive a unique look.

The development of the locomotive was initiated in anticipation of a major tender for universal locomotives by German railways, but moved towards a modular design when the railways moved towards tendering different types of locomotives for different services. The 12X was the basis of a locomotive class for medium-weight freight trains, the DBAG Class 145, the further development of which ultimately led to Bombardier's TRAXX modular locomotive product platform.

== History ==
=== DB Class 121 development ===
DB Class 120 was the first locomotive class of West German federal railway Deutsche Bundesbahn (DB) with three-phase asynchronous AC induction motors, and also the first implementation of the concept of the universal locomotive, which is suited for freight, passenger and express service alike. DB received the five prototypes from 1979, and all Germany-based locomotive manufacturers were involved in the delivery of the 60 series locomotives from 1987. In 1991, DB requested bids for an initial 500 universal locomotives with an improved design and a continuous power increased from 5.6 to 6.4 MW (7,500 to 8,600 hp), the planned DB Class 121. Former East German state railways Deutsche Reichsbahn also considered purchasing 200 units.

The competitors for the DB Class 121 order developed components and from December 1991, tested them in the prototypes of the DB Class 120, which were reclassified as the experimental Class 752. AEG Westinghouse, a supplier of electrical components for rail vehicles that was part of Daimler-Benz at the time, began developing a new final drive concept, a water-cooled converter based on GTO thyristors, an auxiliary converter, and a microprocessor-based traction control system. In 1992, AEG took over former East German locomotive manufacturer LEW Hennigsdorf and made it a subsidiary under its AEG Bahnsysteme (AEG Rail Systems) business area as AEG Schienenfahrzeuge GmbH (AEG Rail Vehicles Ltd). LEW was already developing lightweight vehicle body construction, better aerodynamics, and high-speed running gear. AEG bundled and continued these development efforts with the aim to produce a complete locomotive. The newly developed GTO thyristor based converter was built into DBAG 752 002 in late 1992 and started testing in January next year, the prototype of the new AEG final drive was built into series locomotive DB 120 118 and also began testing in 1993.

=== Project 12x ===
In the meantime, in October 1992, DB cancelled the Class 121 tender due to the high price of the offers, which made government approval for the investment unlikely, and the changed organisational and operational situation. The upcoming merger of Deutsche Bundesbahn and Deutsche Reichsbahn into Deutsche Bahn in 1994 coincided with a railway reform, dividing the rolling stock of Deutsche Bahn between its regional passenger, long-distance passenger and freight business areas, making the universal locomotive plans obsolete. The freight branch of DB was concerned in particular that express trains would be given priority in the use of shared universal locomotives. From late 1993, the business areas of Deutsche Bahn and their predecessors called new bids for electric locomotives tailored for their specific needs.

Locomotive manufacturers responded to the changed situation by focusing on the modularity of their designs, allowing the derivation of different types of locomotives by removing or rearranging the components of a universal locomotive. After the cancellation of the DB Class 121 tender, AEG continued its development effort under the informal project name "12x", and decided to produce a prototype on its own. The decision was also motivated by further elements of the 1994 railway reform, which led to rail operators issuing tenders for complete vehicles rather than let manufacturers compete at the level of components, and the creation of an independent authority for vehicle approval. AEG spent 40 million Deutsche Mark (DM) on the 12x development programme, the construction of the locomotive itself cost another 8 million DM. AEG painted the experimental universal locomotive in the red and white company colours, named it 12X (with capital X), and held its rollout ceremony on 30 June 1994. Although owned by AEG, the 12X was designated 128 001 by DB.

=== Commissioning, reconstruction, test and lease operation ===
In September and October 1995, the 12X was tested on DB's rolling rig in Munich at simulated speeds of up to 330 km/h (205 mph). Following hauled trials and trials at standstill, the locomotive made its first run with own power at 140 km/h (87 mph) on 10 April 1995. By that time, AEG received an order for a lower-speed commercial derivative, the DBAG Class 145. For a test of components to be used in the Class 145 under service conditions, the 12X first completed trials for a preliminary commissioning for 160 km/h (99 mph), and hauled its first regular InterCity train on 22 August 1995, on lease Deutsche Bahn.

In January 1996, ABB and Daimler-Benz merged their railway business areas into a joint venture, ADtranz. On 31 January 1996, Adtranz presented 128 001 in a new, modified livery at the Nuremberg Toy Fair, with an advertisement for UNICEF and the logos of Adtranz and model train manufacturer Märklin, which sponsored the advertisement for a year. The locomotive continued its commissioning trials at speeds of up to 280 km/h (174 mph) in February, later achieving 283 km/h (176 mph), and received its approval for 220 km/h (137 mph) in the summer of 1996.

Adtranz used the 12X as test bed for even more advanced power electronics. In late 1997, the locomotive received new IGBT based converters, which were the first application of this technology in locomotives around the world. In early 1998, the traction control electronics was also replaced. The locomotive also received its final livery, with rainbow-coloured wave patterns on the sidewalls. After extensive trials and trial operation in BLS service on the Lötschberg Line in Switzerland, the locomotive returned to Hennigsdorf. In the following years, the locomotive alternated between test runs to test onboard systems, test locomotive service in the commissioning of new Adtranz models, and regular freight service on lease to DB's freight branch and BASF.

In May 2001, Bombardier Transportation acquired Adtranz. Bombardier continued to use the 12X as test locomotive, stationed at its facility in Oerlikon (Zürich), Switzerland. In July 2010, the locomotive returned to the Hennigsdorf plant.

== Technical details ==
The 12X design maintained the basic configuration of the Class 120: two bogies with two axles each, each axle powered by three-phase asynchronous motors, forced-air cooling of motors with cooling exhausts on the inclined roof edges, airtight machine room with closed walls and a central alley.

=== Electrical part ===
The main transformer is installed underfloor between the two bogies. It has six secondary windings for the traction circuits, one to supply the on-board auxiliary units and charge the batteries, and one more for the electric train supply. The auxiliary windings connect to two 120 kVA auxiliary converters.

The two traction converters, one per bogie, are directly above the transformer, on both sides of the central alley, to keep power cables as short as possible and for a symmetric weight distribution. The original converters were built from modules that include two water-cooled GTO thyristors each, which can be regulated, and thus allow the construction of control circuits with much fewer components than those built with normal thyristors. Three of the modules in each converter functioned as four-quadrant converters between one winding of the transformer each and a direct current (DC) intermediate circuit, two more modules functioned as inverters, providing three-phase variable voltage variable frequency supply to the two motors of a bogie, making individual axle control possible. A version of the module for use as DC chopper under DC catenary supply was also foreseen. For traction and power control, the locomotive was equipped with the GEATRAC II system, which consists of 32-bit microprocessors, allowing for hardware-independent software and updates. Following the upgrade of the locomotive by Adtranz, the GTO thyristor based converters were replaced by IGBT based converters which were suited for multi-voltage operation, and the control technology changed to Adtranz's then current MITRAC system.

=== Mechanical part ===
The 12X was equipped with newly developed GEALAIF final drives, where GEA refers to AEG, and LAIF stands for Lokomotiv-Antrieb mit integriertem Fahrmotor (locomotive final drive with integrated traction motor). The motor axle is connected to the pinion axle of the final drive by a diaphragm coupling that is rotationally and radially rigid but bends softly. The main innovation of the GEAALAIF concept is that the pinion axle is supported by bearings on both sides rather than just on the engine side. This solution reduces bending moments on both the pinion axle and the connected motor axle, thus allowing for the size and mass reduction of both. The integration of final drive and motor also included the reversion of the flow of the forced-air cooling, with the cold air passing down on the final drive side of the engine to cool the pinion, too. The final drive drives the wheelset by way of a Cardan shaft, forming a hollow shaft drive.

The bogie wheelbase is 2,600 mm (102.4 in), shorter than in similar locomotives, with the aim to reduce forces and wear in curves. Prior to tests, Deutsche Bahn's engineers were sceptical about the design, in light of problems with another short bogie, an ABB Flexifloat prototype with a wheelbase of 2,650 mm (104.3 in) that was built into 752 004. However, rolling rig tests and line tests showed stable running. The primary suspension uses metal coil springs, the secondary suspension uses Flexicoil suspension. Traction forces are transmitted between bogie and vehicle body by way of inclined drawbars.

The locomotive body is a lightweight construction, which was intended to make the 12X the lightest locomotive in its power class at 84 t (93 short tons). The actual mass of the finished locomotive was 85.9 t (94.7 short tons) in working order. The structure-bearing parts of the locomotive body are the underframe and the machine room sidewalls, and are made of steel. The roofs, drivers' cabins and the shroud below the underframe covering the transformer are made of plastics and composites, which were glued to the steel frame. The inclined roof edge transitions into the inclined ends of the side walls, which protrude beyond the fronts, forming windflaps designed to increase stability during tunnel crossings, train meetings and station passages.

=== Other general characteristics ===
Environmental sustainability was one of the principles of the 12X development. The cooling medium of the Voith-supplied cooling system of the power electronics uses tap water with glycol as anti-freeze, rather than oil or oil substitutes. For the external painting of the locomotive, water-soluble paints were used instead of two-component paints with a high proportion of organic solvents. Deviating from previous systems, for the air conditioning, a cooling medium without chlorine was chosen.

The components of the 12X were developed as modules that can be removed, replaced or reconfigured in series versions. AEG envisioned four basic vehicle configurations on the basis of the components of the 12X: a high-performance locomotive for express service in the original 12X configuration, a powerhead with driver's cab only at one end for high-speed electric multiple units (EMUs), a light locomotive for regional traffic, and a heavy-haul twin locomotive with driver's cab at one end of both halves. AEG also considered the use of 12X components in an EMU with the power electronics placed underfloor, and the enhancement of the converters for multiple voltage systems. The modularity was also intended to allow for the replacement of components with more modern components as technology advances over the lifespan of the vehicle.

== Derived types ==
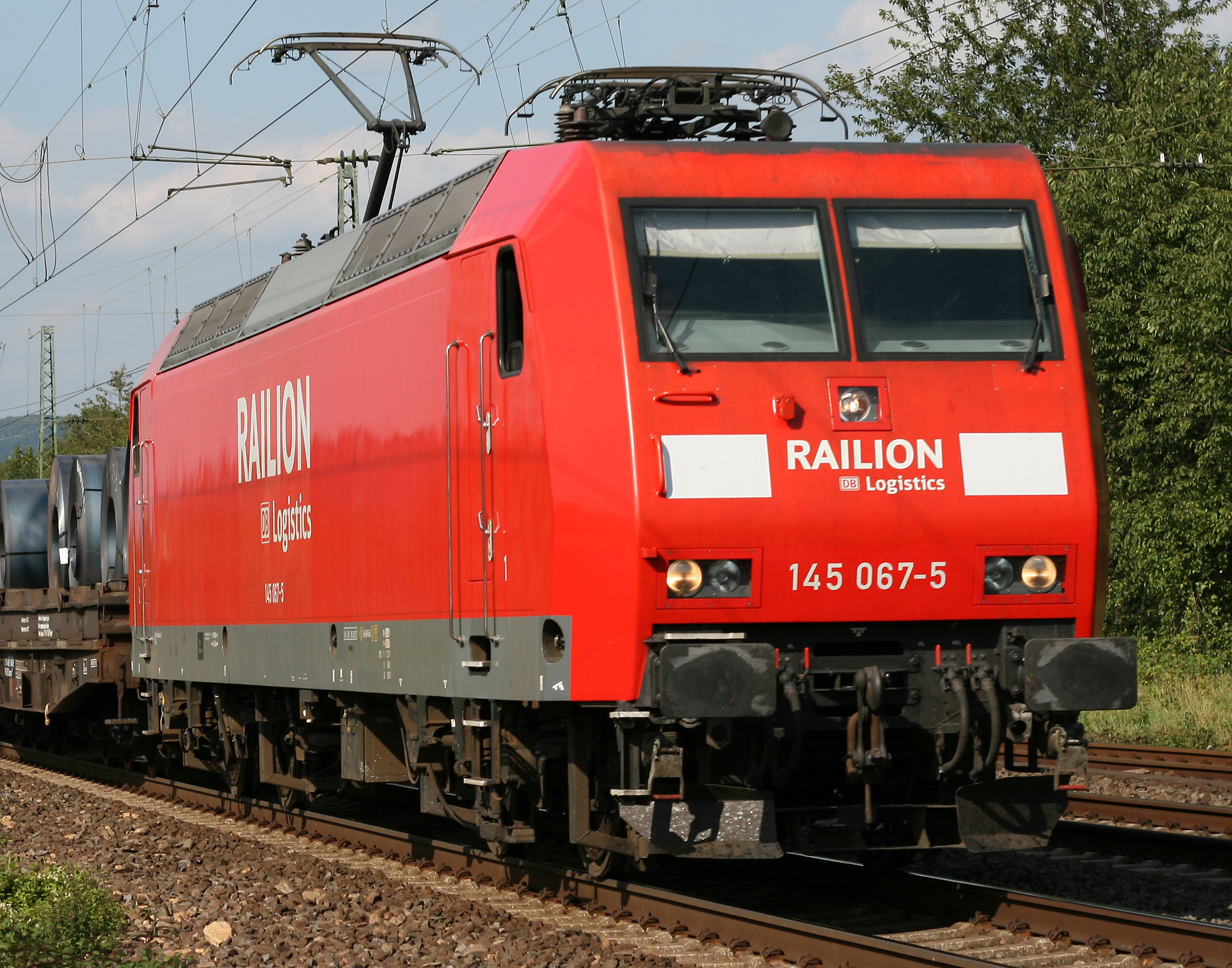
145 067 with the logo of DB Cargo successor and DB Schenker Rail predecessor Railion, in 2007

In November 1994, Deutsche Bahn chose AEG to supply DB's freight business area DB Cargo (today DB Schenker Rail) with eighty locomotives for medium-weight freight trains, the DBAG Class 145. The original Class 145 design was a cheaper derivative of the 12X, leaving away components for higher speeds, including hollow-shaft drives, which were replaced by simpler nose suspended drives. After the merger of AEG Bahnsysteme and ABB Transportation into Adtranz, the final design of the locomotive was adapted for more commonalities with the DBAG Class 101, an express locomotive originally ordered from ABB at the same time. In particular, the less advanced ester-cooled inverters with GTO thyristors and the also ester-cooled main transformer of the DBAG Class 145 was derived from those of the DBAG Class 101, and the bogie design was modified to fit into ABB's Flexicoil family, with wheelbase increased to 2,650 mm (104.3 in).

Later on, the Class 145 was a main basis for Adtranz's planned modular electric locomotive platform, announced in March 1998. Locomotive types derived from the DBAG Class 145 included a dual-voltage version for international traffic, the DBAG Class 185, ordered in July 1998. After Bombardier Transportation bought Adtranz in 2001, it fully implemented the modular locomotive platform idea on the basis of the DBAG Class 185, and named it TRAXX in 2003.

== See also ==
- EuroSprinter: rival product line of Siemens, demonstrator unit DBAG 127 001 was built in 1992
- Prima: rival product line of Alstom, in production from 2001
