= Belgian Railways Class 28 (Bombardier) =

NMBS/SNCB Class 28
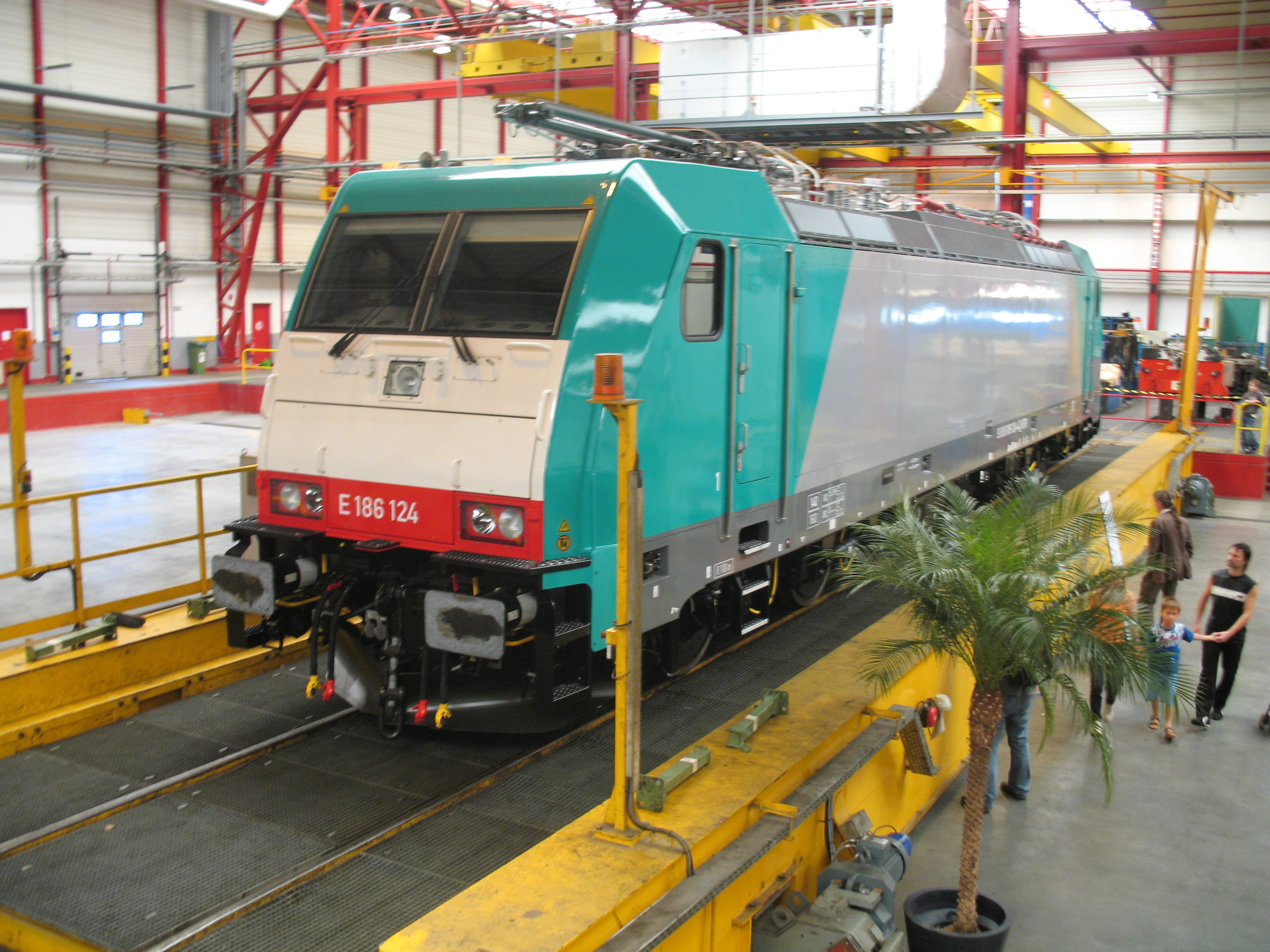
- Bombardier TRAXX locomotive E186 124 exhibited during the NMBS/SNCB open days at Antwerpen-Noord workshops. This locomotive is now renumbered to 2802.
Type and origin
- Power type: DC Electric
- Builder: Bombardier Transportation
- Model: TRAXX F140 MS2
- Build date: 2007-2009
- Total produced: 43
Specifications
- Configuration
  - UIC: Bo'Bo'
- Gauge: 1,435 mm (4 ft 8 1/2 in) standard gauge
- Bogies: Bo-Bo
- Length: 18,900 mm (62 ft 0 in)
- Width: 2,978 mm (9 ft 9.2 in)
- Axle load: 21.25 t (20.91 long tons; 23.42 short tons)
- Loco weight: 85 t (83.66 long tons; 93.70 short tons)
- Electric system/s: 1.5 kV DC; 3.0 kV DC; 25 kV 50 Hz AC; 15 kV 16 2/3 Hz AC
- Current pickup: Pantograph
- Transmission: Electric
- Loco brake: Air
- Train brakes: Air
- Safety systems: ETCS
Performance figures
- Maximum speed: 160 km/h (99 mph)
- Power output: 5,600 kW (7,500 hp)
- Tractive effort: 300 kN (67,000 lbf)
- Factor of adh.: 2.8 (35.7%)
Career
- Operators: B-Cargo
- Class: 28
- Number in class: 43
- Numbers: 2801-2843
- Delivered: 2007-2009
- Current owner: Alpha Trains
- Disposition: In service

The NMBS/SNCB Class 28 number series has been brought back into use for 43 Bombardier TRAXX locomotives which have been hired from Angel Trains Cargo for use with B-Cargo, the freight division of NMBS/SNCB, since renamed Lineas. They are numbered in two series - they carry their original numbers, E186 123 to E186 125, and E186 196 to E186 220, and have also been numbered into the NMBS/SNCB number series, 2801 to 2843.

It was planned that they would work passenger services between Amsterdam, Brecht, Brussels and Antwerp. Several are now running on push-pull Benelux trains, alongside NS Class 186 (NS TRAXX F140 MS). These trains have a locomotive at each end; some trains feature a Class 186 at one end and a Class 28 at the other one.

They also work on the heavy freight corridor between Aachen-West, Antwerp, and Zeebrugge.

The original Class 28 locomotives were produced by Baume-Marpent in 1949.

== Class 29 ==
5 TRAXX F140 MS locomotives especially prepared for operations into France were numbered 2901 to 2905.

- 2901 ex E 186 346-3
- 2902 ex E 186 347-1 (now with Fret SNCF)
- 2903 ex E 186 348-9
- 2904 ex E 186 349-7
- 2905 ex E 186 350-5

== 2861 & 2862 ==
During 2015 two additional TRAXX F140 MS locomotives were hired by NMBS/SNCB and numbered as 2861 & 2862.

- 2861 ex E 186 183-0
- 2862 ex E 186 181-4

They have been joined by E 186 424, covering for locomotives away for maintenance.

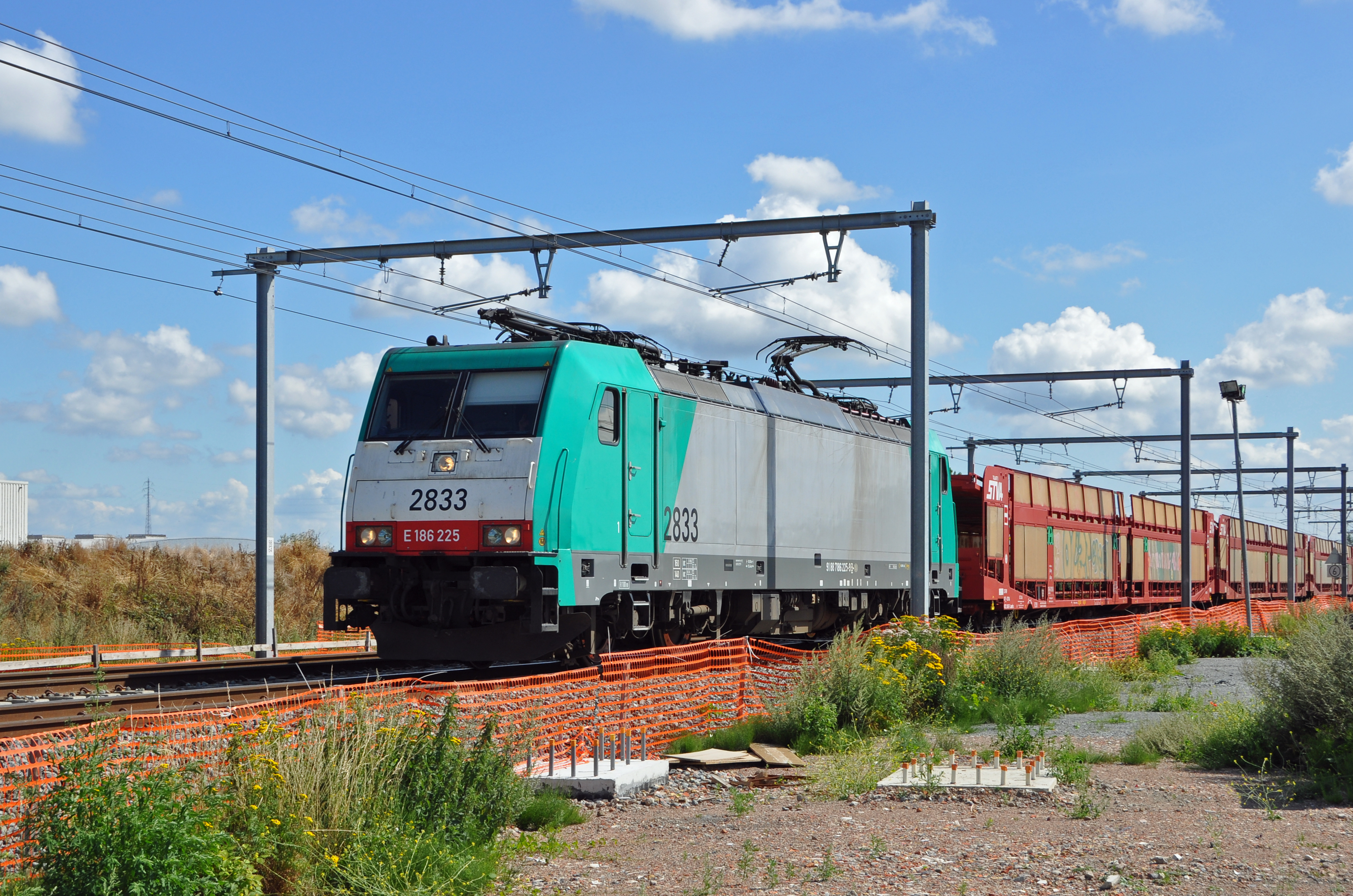
2833 on an empty automobile train.

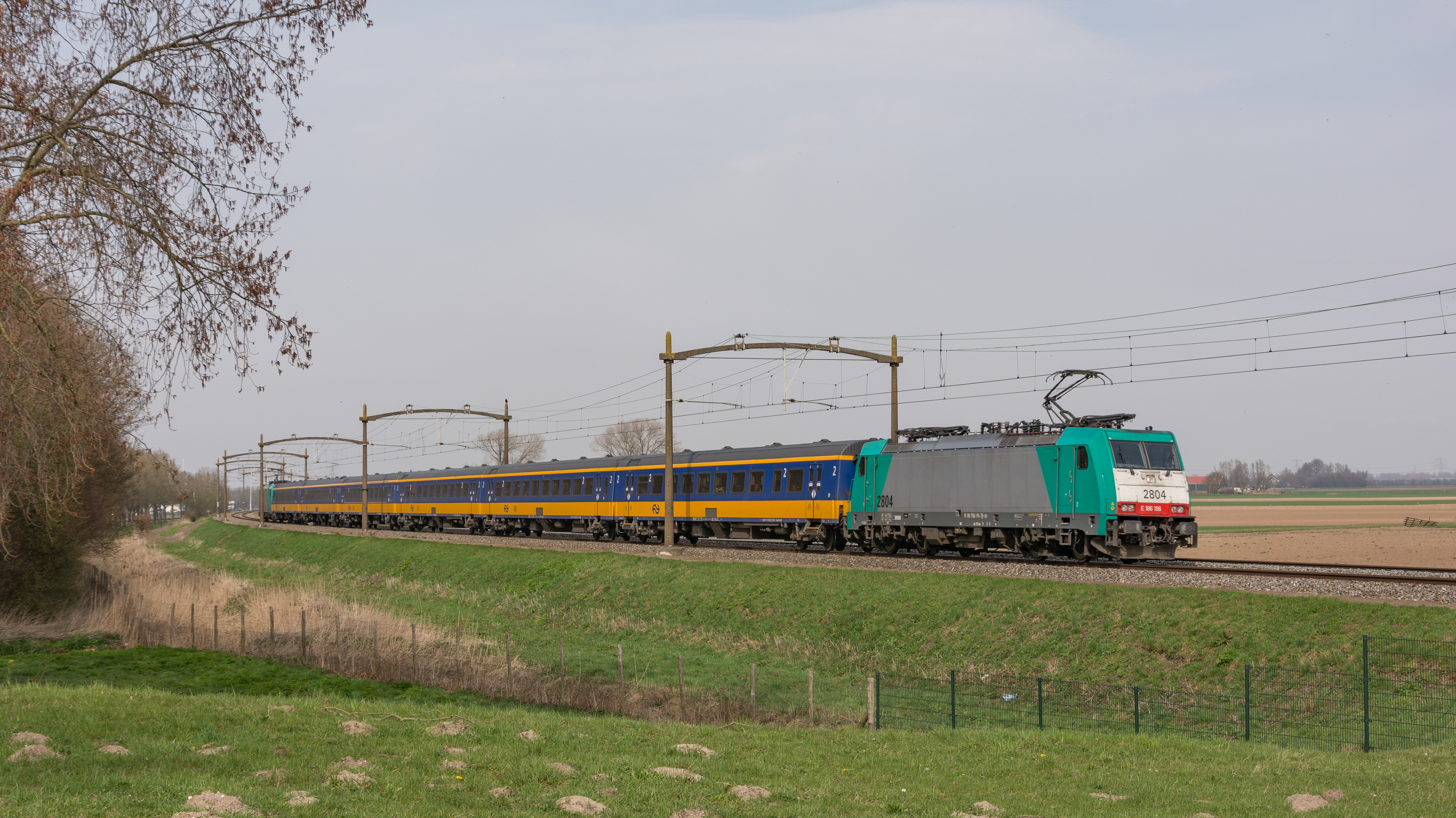
A pair of Class 28 hauling a Benelux train in the Netherlands.
