= NS Class 186 =

B-B electric locomotive

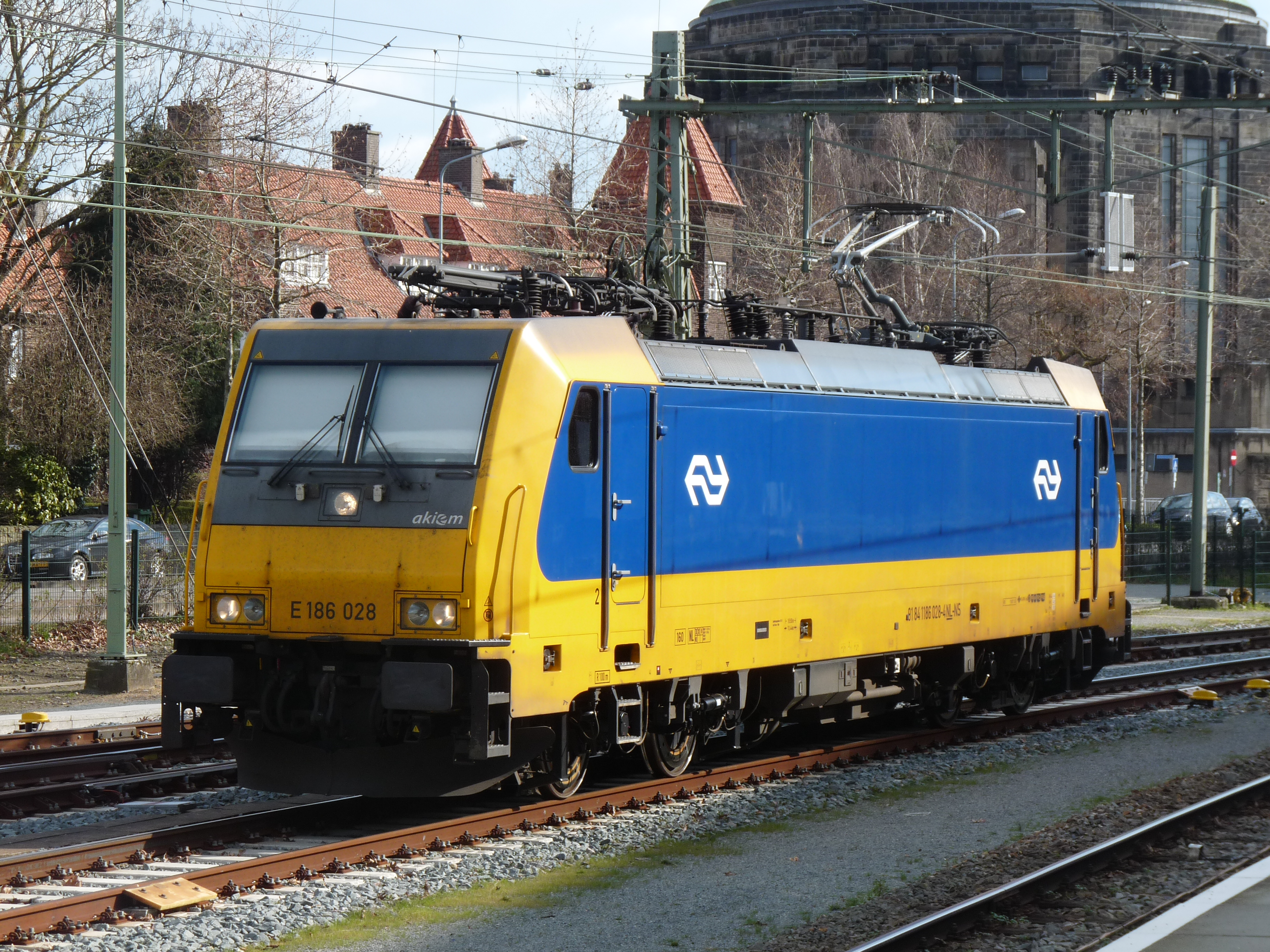
- 186 086 at Maastricht
Type and origin
- Power type: electric
- Builder: Bombardier Transportation
- Model: TRAXX F140 MS
- Build date: 2006-2008, 2014
- Total produced: 12 + 19 + 26
Specifications
- Configuration
  - AAR: B-B
  - UIC: Bo'Bo'
- Gauge: 1,435 mm (4 ft 8 1/2 in)
- Length: 18,900 mm (62 ft 1/8 in)
- Width: 2,980 mm (9 ft 9 3/8 in)
- Loco weight: 84 t (83 long tons; 93 short tons)
- Electric system/s: MS: 15 kV/16.7 Hz, 25 kV/50 Hz AC; DC, MS: 1.5 kV, 3 kV DC
- Current pickup: Pantograph
- Train brakes: Knorr brake (Disc brake), electric brakes
- Safety systems: ETCS ready Various European systems
Performance figures
- Maximum speed: 140 km/h (87 mph), 160 km/h (99 mph) (on HSL-Zuid)
- Power output: Electric: 5.6 MW (7,500 hp)
- Tractive effort: 300 kN (67,000 lb_{f})

The NS Class 186 is a type of B-B electric locomotive built by Bombardier Transportation between 2006 and 2014. It is a member of the Bombardier TRAXX family of locomotives, the Bombardier TRAXX F140 MS2 variant.

The locomotives are used for pulling passenger stock, formerly for NS Hispeed and now for NS International. They are a Multi-Systems variant of the TRAXX, a quadruple voltage locomotive, able to operate on most European electrification schemes: 1.5/3.0 kV DC and 15/25 kV AC.

The Class is formed of two batches, the first introduced in 2008 are leased locomotives. The second batch were introduced in 2014 and are owned by NS.

== History ==
=== HSA batch ===
The locomotives are built in Kassel, Germany. The first 12 locomotives were ordered from Alpha Trains by High Speed Alliance (HSA) in 2005. These arrived in 2008 and 2009 to operate services on the HSL-Zuid between Amsterdam and Breda. These trains have a maximum speed of 160 km/h. These locomotives were intended to be a temporary measure until the V250 high-speed sets entered service. The V250 entered service in 2012, but was taken out of service in early 2013 and these have since been sold back to the manufacturer. For this reason the NS ussed the TRAXX locomotives till the end of 2024.

The leased locomotives were delivered in a red livery with white fronts, but since 2015 are being repainted yellow-blue.

=== NS batch ===
On 18 December 2013 NS announced that 19 locomotives had been ordered in addition to the 12 leased TRAXX locomotives in service. These were delivered between August 2014 and January 2015. This batch are owned by NS and are in the company's yellow-blue livery.

On 17 June 2015 NS announced that a new batch of 26 locomotives had been ordered. The delivery started on 23 May 2016. The new locomotives will help the NS to drive each high-speed train in a so-called 'sandwich-formation' (locomotive + coaches + locomotive). Delivery was completed on 27 November 2016.

Sale to Akiem

Since NS plans to replace the push-pulls sets with high speed multiple units in the near future, the old coaching stock will be withdrawn while these comparatively new locomotives will be useless. In 2018, NS took a sale-and-leaseback agreement with Akiem for the entire Class 186 engines they own. NS will lease these engines from Akiem until the ICNG trainsets are delivered. The Class 186 would then find other purposes.

== Services ==
The locomotives operate Intercity Direct services between Amsterdam, Rotterdam and Breda and The Hague, Rotterdam, Breda and Eindhoven. These use the High Speed Line (HSL-Zuid) and are operated by Nederlandse Spoorwegen.

Some of them are used on push-pull Benelux trains between Amsterdam, Antwerp and Brussels along with SNCB class 28. Since classes 28 and 186 are both Traxx MS 140 fitted with push-pull equipment, some Benelux trains run with a class 28 at one end and a class 186 at the other end.

== Fleet ==
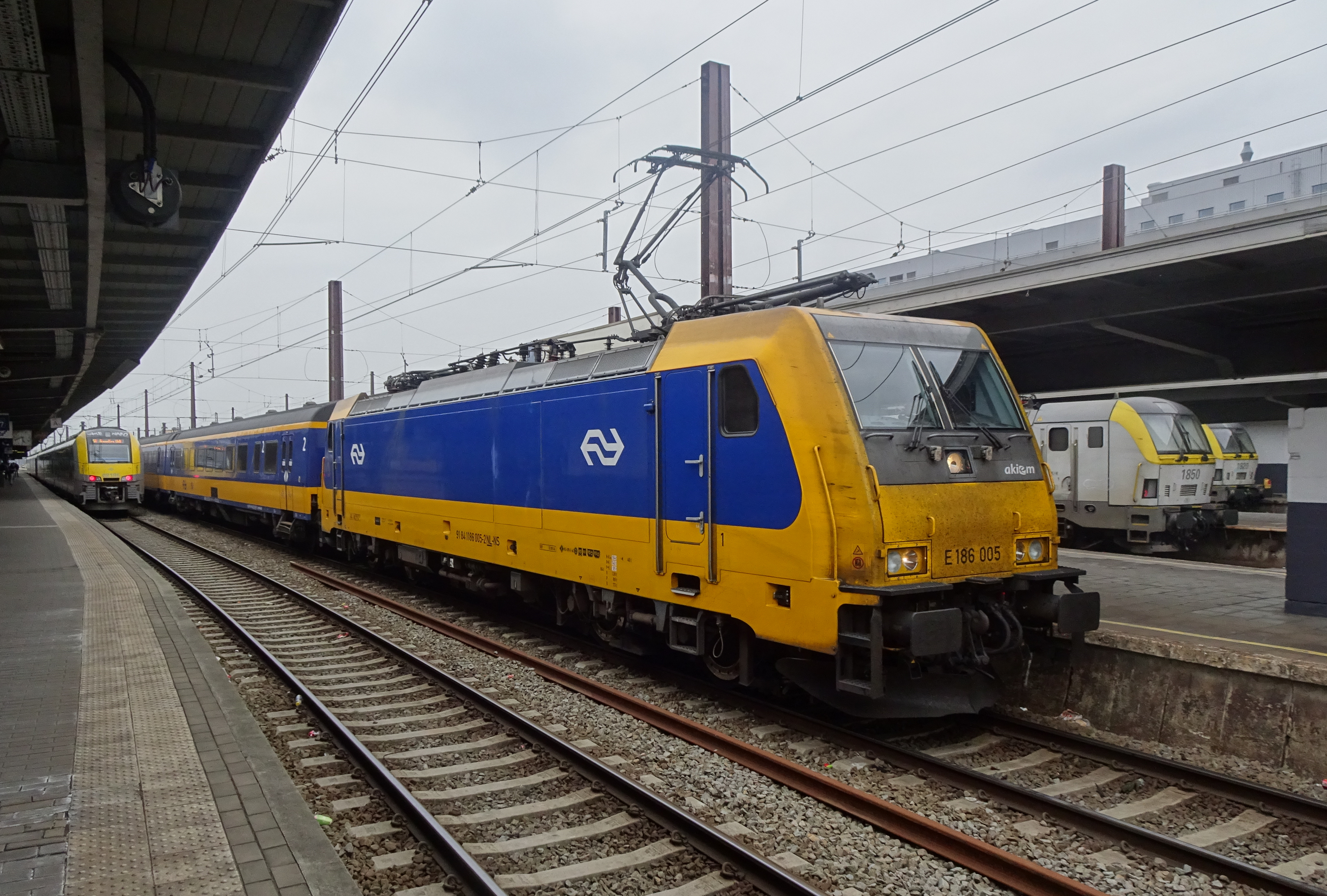
186 005 at Brussels South with a Benelux train.

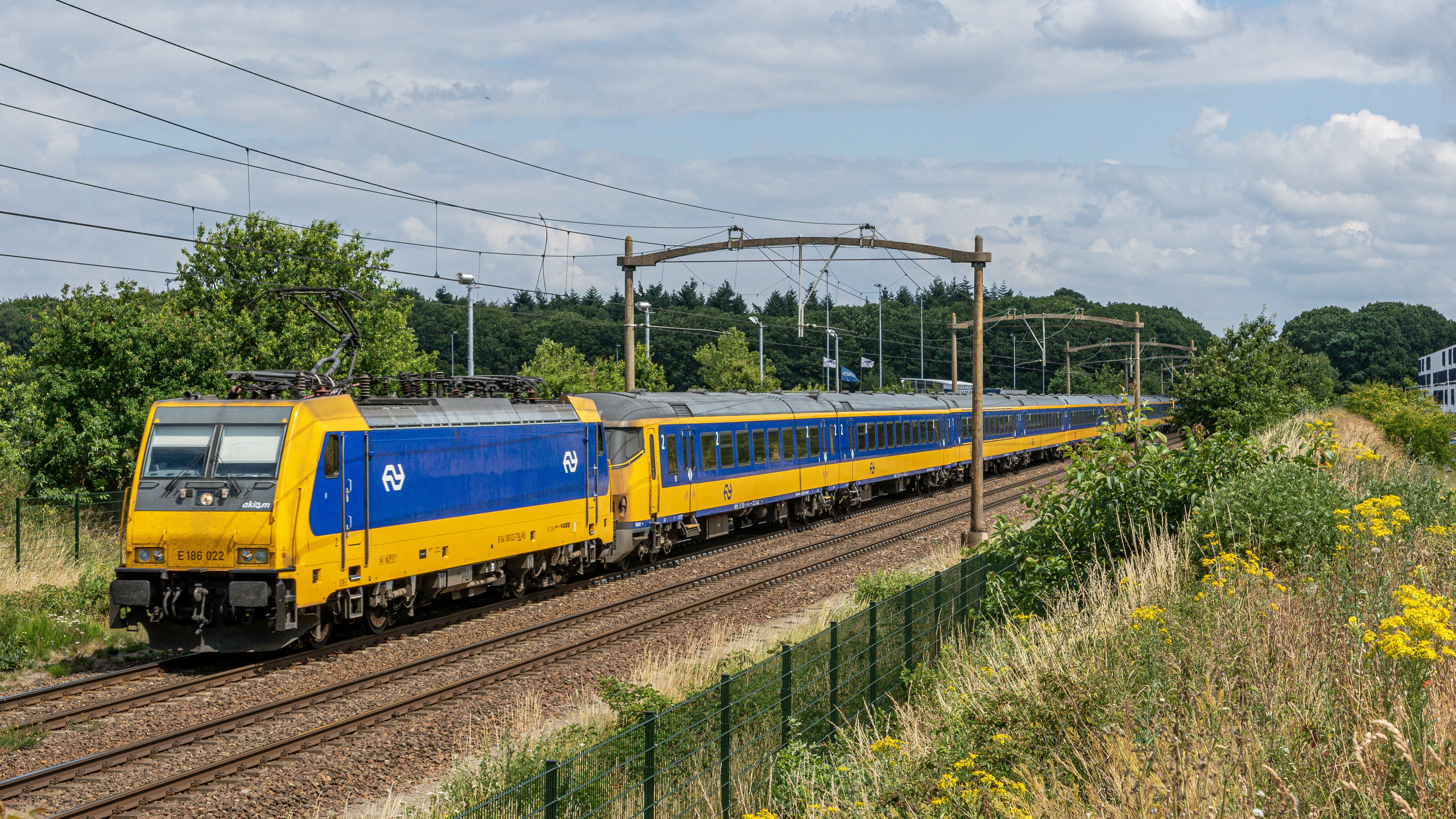
186 022 pulling Intercityrijtuig coaches

The NS Class 186 fleet comprises 45 yellow/blue locomotives leased from Akiem and 18 from Alpha Trains. Several more are leased without the yellow/blue scheme.

Number:	Name:	Built:	Owner:
186 001	-	2014	Akiem
186 002	-	2014	Akiem
186 003	-	2014	Akiem
186 004	-	2014	Akiem
186 005	-	2014	Akiem
186 006	-	2014	Akiem
186 007	-	2014	Akiem
186 008	-	2014	Akiem
186 009	-	2014	Akiem
186 010	-	2014	Akiem
186 011	-	2014	Akiem
186 012	-	2014	Akiem
186 013	-	2014	Akiem
186 014	-	2014	Akiem
186 015	-	2014	Akiem
186 016	-	2014	Akiem
186 017	-	2014	Akiem
186 018	-	2014	Akiem
186 019	-	2015	Akiem
186 020	-	2016	Akiem
186 021	-	2016	Akiem
186 022	-	2016	Akiem
186 023	-	2016	Akiem
186 024	-	2016	Akiem
186 025	-	2016	Akiem
186 026	-	2016	Akiem
186 027	-	2016	Akiem
186 028	-	2016	Akiem
186 029	-	2016	Akiem
186 030	-	2016	Akiem
186 031	-	2016	Akiem
186 032	-	2016	Akiem
186 033	-	2016	Akiem
186 034	-	2016	Akiem
186 035	-	2016	Akiem
186 036	-	2016	Akiem
186 037	-	2016	Akiem
186 038	-	2016	Akiem
186 039	-	2016	Akiem
186 040	-	2016	Akiem
186 041	-	2016	Akiem
186 042	-	2016	Akiem
186 043	-	2016	Akiem
186 044	-	2016	Akiem
186 045	-	2016	Akiem
186 111–1	Karin	2006	Alpha Trains
186 112–9	Erik Jan	2007	Alpha Trains
186 113–7	Mario	2007	Alpha Trains
186 114–5	-	2007	Alpha Trains
186 115–2	-	2007	Alpha Trains
186 116–0	Heleen	2007	Alpha Trains
186 117–8	-	2007	Alpha Trains
186 118–6	Martien	2007	Alpha Trains
186 119–4	-	2007	Alpha Trains
186 120–2	Milo	2007	Alpha Trains
186 121–0	Gabriël	2007	Alpha Trains
186 122–8	-	2007	Alpha Trains

== Livery ==
The Class 186 wears the Huisstijl blue and yellow livery. Since their sale to Akiem, they carry a small Akiem logo under the left windshield.
