= Ascendos Rail Leasing =

European rolling stock company

Ascendos Rail Leasing S.à r.l.
- Industry: Rail transport leasing (Europe)
- Predecessor: Porterbrook
- Founded: 2004 (as CBRail)
- Headquarters: Luxembourg
- Owner: Consortium of: Everest Babcock & Brown Opportunities Fund; Global Investments Limited; BOSSAF Rail Limited
- Website: www.ascendos.com

Ascendos Rail Leasing S.à r.l., formerly CBRail, was a European rolling stock leasing company based in Luxembourg. Its business activities were focused on Continental Europe, and had offices in Luxembourg, Germany and the United Kingdom.

It was formed as a subsidiary of the British rail leasing company Porterbrook to handle its European operations; during December 2004, its purchase by a joint venture between Babcock & Brown and Bank of Scotland Corporate Europe was announced. Throughout the rest of the decade, the company formed multiple deals to expand its inventory of rolling stock. By June 2008, the company had 118 locomotives, 785 freight wagons and 103 passenger vehicles either on lease or under construction. At the start of 2010, the company rebranded itself as Ascendos Rail Leasing, after being unable to adopt its preferred name of Eurorail.

In June 2016, it was announced that Beacon Rail Leasing, a competing Pan-European rolling stock lessor, was in the process of acquiring Ascendos Rail Leasing. The portfolio of the combined companies comprised 225 locomotives and over 1,000 freight wagons on lease across various European nations. The Ascendos Rail Leasing name ceased to be used following the company's integration into Beacon.

== Background ==
What would become CBRail originated as a wholly owned subsidiary of the British-based Porterbrook rail leasing company, which had created it to focus on the mainland European rail market. During December 2004, it was announced that Porterbrook had agreed terms for the acquisition of its European leasing operations by a joint venture between Babcock & Brown and Bank of Scotland Corporate Europe (a banking division of HBOS). At the time of the purchase, the subsidiary held leasing arrangements involving 28 locomotives and 67 coaches.

Following the acquisition, the company intended to use its new financial backing to build a significant market share within the European railway leasing business; accordingly, CBRail quickly decided to expand its rolling stock inventory. During February 2006, an $156 Million order was placed with the multinational rolling stock manufacturer Bombardier Transportation for 35 diesel and electric TRAXX locomotives, this arrangement also included an option for a further 70 locomotives. Further purchases of rolling stock, including freight wagons, were completed to expand CBRail's portfolio.

By June 2008, the company had 118 locomotives, 785 freight wagons and 103 passenger vehicles either on lease or under construction that was reportedly valued in excess of €450 million. These locomotives included EMD Class 66, Siemens Class ER20 and GE 311D diesels, Alstom Prima 3U15 electrics, as well as both electric and diesel Bombardier TRAXX units. The company's inventory also included Alstom Coradia LINT and Stadler FLIRT multiple units.

CBRail pursued a model of flexible leasing, targeting both private operators and state-owned railway entities. By the end of 2008, arrangements had been implemented with operators across France, Germany, Italy, Poland, the Netherlands, and Switzerland. The company had been organised into two principal subsidiaries, CBRail Sarl and CBRail Leasing Sarl, based in Luxemburg; the former handled the purchasing of new rolling stock from manufacturers, while the latter was responsible for the packaging of these longer term financing vehicles.

At the start of 2010, the company rebranded itself as Ascendos Rail Leasing. Reportedly, this had not been the first choice for bring renamed; however, the more favoured name of Eurorail was already a legally protected one, and thus unavailable for use. By the time of the rebranding, various subsidiaries had been established and were operating in various European nations.

Occasionally, the company would also sell portions of its rolling stock to other operators. During May 2014, it was announced that the Danish railway operator DSB had arranged to purchase 67 double-deck coaches that it had been previously leasing from Ascendos.

In June 2016, it was announced that Ascendos Rail Leasing was to be acquired by Beacon Rail Leasing, a competing Pan-European rolling stock lessor. The combined Beacon and Ascendos portfolio comprised 225 locomotives and over 1,000 freight wagons on lease in the UK, Scandinavia, Belgium, the Netherlands, Poland and Germany, 55 passenger train units on lease in the UK and Germany, and 13 sets of Mark 5 coaches which will be operated by TransPennine Express in the UK.

== See also ==
- Mitsui Rail Capital
- Alpha Trains
- Railpool
