= Type 28 =

Type 28 may refer to:

- Bristol Type 28, a British civil utility biplane
- Peugeot Type 28, an automobile made by Peugeot
- Nieuport Type 28, a French biplane fighter aircraft
- The Great 28, a greatest hits album by classic rock and roller Chuck Berry
- Twenty-Eight Teeth, the third album from Buck-O-Nine
- Type 28, a British hardened field defence of World War II

== See also ==
- 28 (disambiguation)
- Class 28 (disambiguation)
- T28 (disambiguation)
