= T28 =

T28 may refer to:

== Aircraft ==
- Enstrom T-28, an American helicopter
- North American T-28 Trojan, an American trainer
- Slingsby T.28, a British glider

== Armoured land vehicles ==
- T-28 (medium tank), a Soviet tank
- T28 super-heavy tank, an American experimental self-propelled gun
- T28 armored car, an American armored vehicle

== Naval vessels ==
- German torpedo boat T28
- HMS Locust (T28), a patrol boat of the Royal Navy

== Other uses ==
- T28 (wrestler) (born 1983), Japanese professional wrestler
- Abeno Station, in Abeno-ku, Osaka, Japan
- Ericsson T28, a mobile phone
- Takamatsu Station (Kagawa), in Japan

== See also ==
- Type 28 (disambiguation)
