= Belgian Railways Class 28 (Baume-Marpent) =

NMBS/SNCB Class 28
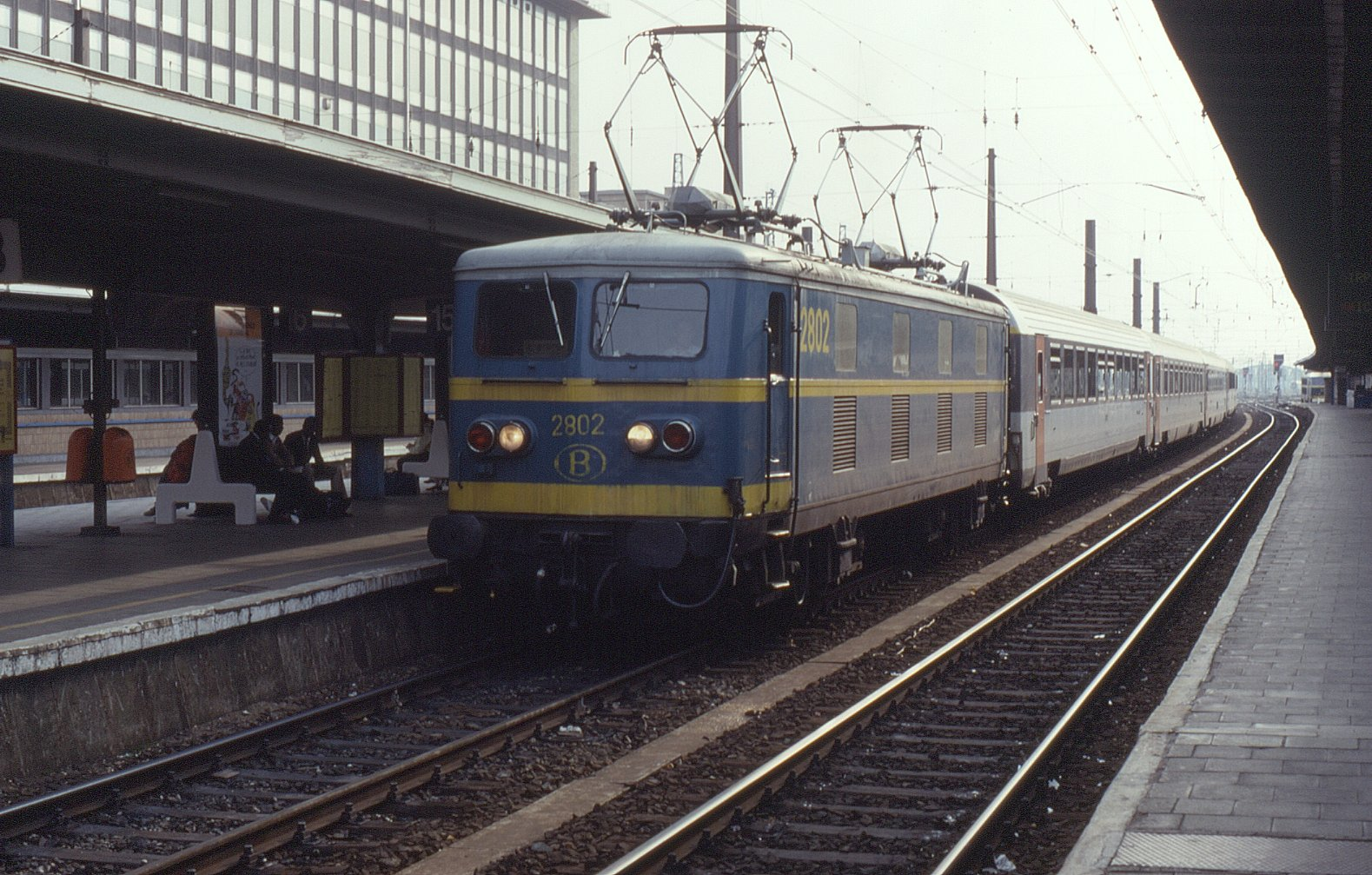
- 2802 at Brussels-South railway station
Type and origin
- Power type: DC Electric
- Builder: Baume-Marpent
- Build date: 1949
- Total produced: 3
Specifications
- Configuration
  - UIC: Bo'Bo'
- Gauge: 1,435 mm (4 ft 8 1/2 in) standard gauge
- Length: 17,180 mm (56 ft 4 in)
- Axle load: 21 t (20.67 long tons; 23.15 short tons)
- Loco weight: 84 t (82.67 long tons; 92.59 short tons)
- Electric system/s: 3000 V DC
- Current pickup: Pantograph
Performance figures
- Maximum speed: 130 km/h (81 mph)
- Power output: 1,620 kW (2,172 hp) continuous, 1,985 kW (2,662 hp) one hour
- Tractive effort: 196 kN (44,000 lbf)
Career
- Operators: NMBS/SNCB
- Class: 28
- Number in class: 3
- Numbers: 2801-2803
- Disposition: 2801 preserved, others scrapped.

The original NMBS/SNCB Class 28 locomotives were produced by Baume - Marpent _{(nl)} in 1949 and entered service in 1950. Three were built under the designation of Type 120. They were built as prototypes to help SNCB develop a standard electric locomotive for future electrification projects. They are in no way related to Type 101/Class 29 locomotives, which were an off the shelf design already in use as Class BB 300 by SNCF. They also had nothing in common with Type 121, another series of three prototypes that SNCB bought at the same time. Class 121 was designed in Switzerland and used a number of existing Swiss components but they were assembled in Belgium.

They were delivered in two tones of green. Later yellow safety bands were added across their fronts to increase visibility. This got replaced by all-over green with silver stripes as on later locomotives. The original numbering was 120.001, 120.002 and 120.003. In 1971 they became the original Class 20, numbered 2001, 2002 and 2003. When the order for the new six axle 7000 HP Class 20 was placed with BN in late in 1973, these three locos became 2801, 2802 and 2803. All three were painted blue some time after they became Class 28. They were and still are very popular with Belgian railfans.

2801 is preserved by SNCB at Haine-Saint-Pierre.

The Class 28 number series has been reused for leased Bombardier TRAXX locomotives, 2801 to 2843. There is also a second short series of five TRAXX locos called Class 29. They are numbered 2901 to 2905. They look the same as Class 28 but are technically different as they can operate in France while the Class 28 can not.
