= Alstom Traxx =

Family of locomotives manufactured by Alstom, originally by Bombardier

Alstom Traxx family (electric)
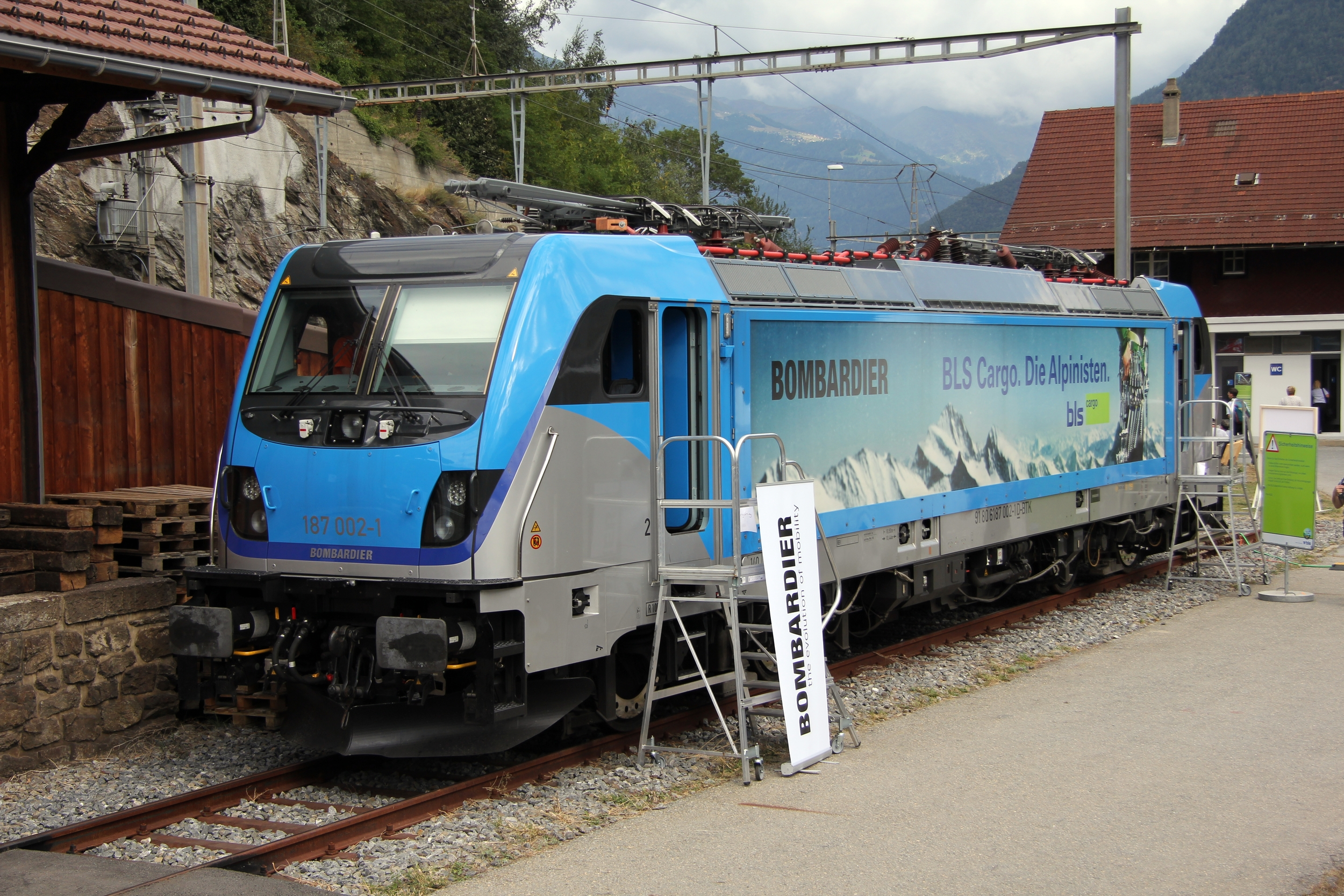
- Bombardier TRAXX Last Mile
Type and origin
- Power type: Electric
- Builder: Bombardier Transportation, Alstom (2021–)
- Model: TRAXX F140 AC; TRAXX P140 AC; TRAXX P160 AC; TRAXX P160 DE; TRAXX F140 AC2; TRAXX F140 MS; TRAXX P200 MS; TRAXX F140 DE
- Build date: 1996–present
- Total produced: 1,800 as of 2015
Specifications
- Configuration
  - AAR: B-B
  - UIC: Bo′Bo′
- Gauge: 1,435 mm (4 ft 8 1/2 in) standard gauge, 1,668 mm (5 ft 5 21/32 in) (Spain and Portugal)
- Length: 18,900 mm (62 ft 1/8 in)
- Width: 2,980 mm (9 ft 9 3/8 in)
- Loco weight: 80–85 t (79–84 long tons; 88–94 short tons) (84–88 t or 83–87 long tons or 93–97 short tons) (Note: Sources vary on the mass of the locomotives, with the builders documentation also giving contradictory data. The relative masses are constant -with the diesel and DC versions being the lightest, the AC version weighing more, and the AD/DC version being the heaviest)
- Electric system/s: AC, MS: 15 kV/16.7 Hz, 25 kV/50 Hz AC; DC, MS: 1.5 kV, 3 kV DC; DE: - Catenary
- Current pickup: Pantograph
- Train brakes: Knorr brake (Disc brake), electric brakes
- Safety systems: ETCS ready Various European systems
Performance figures
- Maximum speed: 140 km/h (87 mph) (freight versions), 160 km/h (99 mph) (passenger versions), 200 km/h (124 mph) version also available
- Power output: Electric: 5.6–6.4 MW (7,500–8,600 hp) (1.5 kV: 4.0 MW (5,400 hp)); Diesel: 2.2 MW (3,000 hp)
- Tractive effort: 270–340 kN (61,000–76,000 lb_{f})
Career
- Locale: Europe

Alstom Traxx (sold as Bombardier TRAXX before 2021) is a modular product platform of mainline diesel-electric and electric locomotives. It was produced originally by Bombardier Transportation and later Alstom, and was built in both freight and passenger variants. The first version was a dual-voltage AC locomotive built for German railways from the year 2000. Later types included DC versions, as well as quadruple-voltage machines, able to operate on all four electrification schemes commonly used in Europe. The family was expanded in 2006 to include diesel-powered versions. Elements common to all variants include steel bodyshells, two bogies with two powered axles each, three-phase asynchronous induction motors, cooling exhausts on the roof edges, and wheel disc brakes.

The TRAXX brand name itself was introduced in 2003. The acronym stands for Transnational Railway Applications with eXtreme fleXibility. With the takeover of Bombardier Transportation by Alstom in January 2021, the trademark rights were transferred to the new owner. In the summer of 2023, Alstom extended the use of the word mark to the entire range of locomotives and completely stopped using its own word mark Prima . At the same time, communication was switched to the journalistic spelling Traxx and additional word marks were registered.

Locomotives were primarily made for the railways of Germany, with orders coming from other countries including France, Israel, Switzerland, Sweden, Norway, Italy, Belgium, Luxembourg, Poland, Spain, Hungary, South Africa, the Netherlands and Romania.

The TRAXX locomotives were developed at Bombardier plants in Mannheim, Zürich Oerlikon in Switzerland and Vado Ligure in Italy. The final assembly of the vehicles takes place at Bombardier's locomotive production centres at Kassel in Germany and Vado Ligure (only the DC Variant).

== Development ==
=== AEG 12X, ABB Eco2000 platform ===
In the early 1990s, West German federal railway Deutsche Bundesbahn (DB) sought to replace its ageing electric locomotive fleet with a single type. In the previous decade, DB introduced its first universal locomotives with three-phase asynchronous induction motors and two bogies with two powered axles each, the DB Class 120, which had been successful. In 1991, DB requested bids for about 1000 more universal locomotives with an improved design and increased power, the planned DB Class 121. The railway industry began developing new locomotives, but in October 1992, DB cancelled the tender due to the high price of the offers and the changed situation. In 1994, Deutsche Bundesbahn merged with the former East German Deutsche Reichsbahn, creating Deutsche Bahn, bringing over 600 modern DR Class 243 locomotives into the joint locomotive fleet. In addition, the merger coincided with a railway reform, dividing the rolling stock of Deutsche Bahn between its regional passenger, long-distance passenger and freight business areas, making the universal locomotive plans obsolete. From late 1993, the business areas of Deutsche Bahn and their predecessors called new bids for electric locomotives tailored for their specific needs.

The competitors for the DB Class 121 included two of the forerunners of Bombardier Transportation: German locomotive manufacturer AEG Schienenfahrzeuge, a part of AEG which was controlled by Daimler-Benz at the time; and ABB Henschel, a German locomotive manufacturing branch of Swedish-Swiss company ABB. Components of both the AEG and ABB concepts were built into the prototypes of the DB Class 120 for trials from late 1991. AEG followed up its development effort by building an experimental universal locomotive, the 12X. This locomotive can be considered the predecessor of the TRAXX family. The 12X was delivered in June 1994 and, although owned by AEG, was designated Class 128 by DB. The 12X featured several innovations compared to the Class 120, including water-cooled inverters based on GTO thyristors, a new final drive concept with pivot axle bearings on both sides, and a new bogie concept with a short wheelbase of 2,600 mm (102.4 in). The locomotive also had a modular design, allowing the derivation of different versions for different operational needs, and thus it formed AEG's basis to compete for the new orders of Deutsche Bahn's business areas. Meanwhile, ABB developed its own design of a modular electric locomotive platform, the Eco2000 concept. ABB's concept included a version of its Flexifloat high-speed bogie family with a wheelbase of 2,650 mm (104.3 in); and biodegradable ester cooled inverters with GTO thyristors and an also ester cooled main transformer, which can be considered the origin of the inverters and transformer of the first generation of TRAXX locomotives.

The 12X was later used as testbed for new technologies, becoming the first locomotive in the world with IGBT based converters in 1997 and testing the MITRAC traction control electronics from 1998. Both of these technologies would later find their commercial application in TRAXX locomotives.

=== DBAG Class 145 family, Adtranz Octeon platform ===
In November 1994, Deutsche Bahn chose ABB and AEG for two of its orders: ABB was to deliver 145 express locomotives for DB's long-distance business area DB Fernverkehr, the DB Class 101, while AEG was to supply DB's freight business area DB Cargo with eighty locomotives for medium-weight freight trains, the DBAG Class 145.

The original Class 145 design was a cheaper derivative of the 12X, omitting components for higher speeds, including hollow-shaft drives, which were replaced by simpler axle hung drives. In January 1996, ABB and Daimler-Benz merged their railway business areas into a joint venture, ADtranz. The final design of the locomotive was adapted for more commonalities with the DBAG Class 101. The biodegradable ester cooled inverters with GTO thyristors and the also ester cooled main transformer of the DBAG Class 145 was derived from those of the DBAG Class 101, but with less components for the lower maximum power, providing for individual bogie control rather than individual axle control. The bogie design was also adapted and merged into the ABB-originated Flexifloat family, with wheelbase increased to 2,650 mm (104.3 in). Due to the shared features, the Class 145 was sometimes described as a member of the Eco2000 family.

Adtranz rolled out the first Class 145 in July 1997. In addition, 17 identical locomotives were built for lease to private railways. A further six locomotives were built for the Swiss railway MittelThurgauBahn.

In March 1998, Adtranz announced its intent to consolidate its product range into seven modular product platforms. The electric locomotive platform with the brand name "Octeon" was to be based on Adtranz's newest types for Germany (the Class 145 and Class 101). Adtranz originally intended to introduce Octeon types alongside existing products, and applied the name to its new products outside Germany at the end of the nineties, like the FS Class E464 or the heavy-haul locomotive Iore. The GTO thyristor based converters of these locomotives were from the water-cooled Camilla family, which was developed by ABB as successor for the oil-cooled converters in the SBB-CFF-FFS Re 460. The Octeon brand name did not catch on and was abandoned when Bombardier acquired Adtranz in 2001.

Between 2000 and 2002, a version of the DBAG Class 145 for passenger trains, with hollow shaft final drive and a higher top speed of 160 km/h, was produced for DB's regional business area DB Regio. The top of the front of the carbodies was modified to provide space for a flip-disc display. These locomotives were given the designation DBAG Class 146.0.

Although the production of the DBAG Class 145 ended by the time Bombardier bought Adtranz in 2001, and even the production of the Class 146.0 locomotives ended by the time the TRAXX brand name was introduced in 2003, in Bombardier's own publications, the Class 145 was included in the TRAXX F140 AC, the Class 146.0 in the TRAXX P160 AC type. The still in-production FS Class E464 got the designation TRAXX P160 DCP, while TRAXX H80 AC was applicable to the Iore class, however, these then still in production types were excluded from the TRAXX family in publications after 2007.

=== DBAG Class 185 family, Bombardier TRAXX platform ===
In July 1998, Adtranz received a follow-on order for 400 more locomotives for medium-weight freight trains, the DBAG Class 185. The double voltage Class 185 was meant for international operation, and was also dubbed Europalok. The basic concept of the running gear, the axle hung motors, the ester cooled inverters and transformer was maintained from the Class 145. In addition to the electronics for double voltage operation, modifications included the provision for the installation of the full variety of train protection systems in use in Europe, and the lowering of the roof by 105 mm to fit the vehicle in the international UIC 505-1 loading gauge.

In 2001 Bombardier bought Adtranz, thus acquiring locomotive building technology. Under Bombardier, the Class 185 was developed into a family like that of the Class 145, with private railway and passenger (DBAG Class 146.1) versions. In May 2003, Bombardier also received an order for a quadruple system version from the Swiss Federal Railways (SBB).

In September 2003, Bombardier gave the Class 185 family a brand name, TRAXX, intended to allude to the terms 'traction', 'track' and 'attraction'. The acronym stands for Transnational Railway Applications with eXtreme fleXibility. The first letter of TRAXX type designations provides for differentiation according to the area of application, with F for freight and P for passenger. The original system also tentatively included H for heavy-haul and S for high-speed, but no actual vehicles were delivered under this designation. The number following the first letter indicates the top speed of the locomotive in kilometers per hour. The next two letters indicate the supply system, with AC for alternating current electric locomotives, DC for direct current electric locomotives, MS for multi-system locomotives capable of operating both under AC and DC overhead wires, and DE was foreseen from the start for an eventual Diesel-electric version. An extra P letter at the end was to designate powerheads (traction heads), that is locomotives with one driving cabin for push-pull operation. An also optional number at the end designates different versions, later used for the designation of generations.

In the new system, the factory designation of the DBAG Class 185 and its sisters with other railways became TRAXX F140 AC, that of the DBAG Class 146.1 TRAXX P160 AC, and that of the planned quadruple voltage SBB locomotive TRAXX F140 MS.

When Bombardier introduced the first TRAXX 2 types, the original family was also designated TRAXX 1, and the number 1 was added at the end of the type designation of first-generation locomotives still in delivery.

=== TRAXX 2 and TRAXX 2E platforms ===
In 2004, the basic TRAXX design was subjected to a major overhaul, with the carbody and the front redesigned to suit current crashworthiness standards, and the replacement of GTO thyristor based inverters with IGBT based inverters. The option of individual axle control in place of individual bogie control was also introduced. The coolant of the inverters and the main transformer was also changed from ester to water. The carbody design was completely standardised, by default providing a space for the mounting of a flip-disc display above the windshield, which is covered by a non-structural hood in freight versions. The bogie frame was strengthened, to allow an increase of axle loads to 22 tons. This generation of the family is also referred to as the TRAXX 2 platform, and is sometimes also indicated with a number 2 at the end of the type designations.

The TRAXX carbody design and internal configuration was modified again in 2006 when the first actual Diesel-electric version was built, to provide the same layout for Diesel and electric versions. In the electric versions, the central location of the diesel engine was used for the AC transformer or the DC chokes. The weight of the component at the central location is supported on a horizontal mounting plate that fits onto the main frame using the same fixtures. This generation of the family is also referred to as the TRAXX 2E platform, the type designations themselves didn't change. The TRAXX 2E generation also included the first actual deliveries of the DC versions of the TRAXX platform. The AC version of the TRAXX 2 remained in production in parallel with the 2E versions of other types.

=== Traxx Africa ===
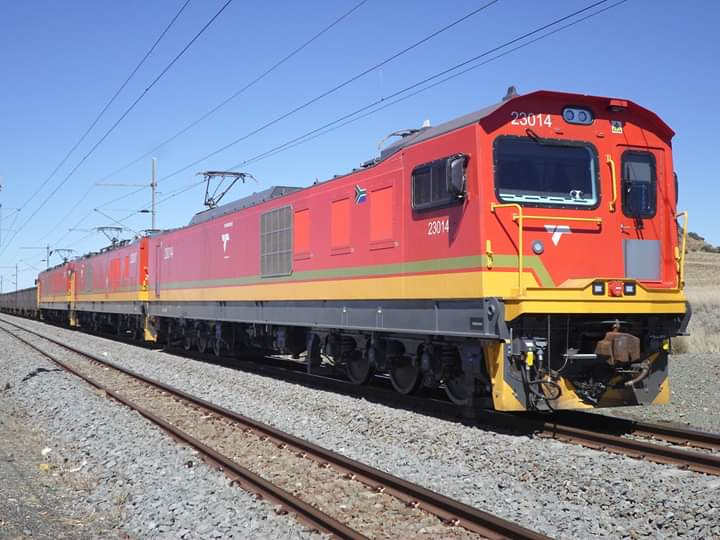
Traxx Africa, Transnet class 23E

In March 2014, Transnet ordered 240 dual-voltage 1,067 mm (3 ft 6 in) Traxx Africa locomotives, to be built in South Africa. The first locomotive was handed over to Transnet in December 2017, with revenue service planned to begin early in 2018. As of December 2020, Transnet has 56 Traxx Africa locomotives.

== Production ==
All Traxx locomotives are assembled and tested at Alstom's (originally Bombardier) plant in Kassel Germany, except the DC only versions which are assembled at Vado Ligure and some Renfe Class 253, which have been assembled by Renfe in its shop in Villaverde (Madrid).

The individual components are sourced from a variety of sites:

- Traction and auxiliary converters (inverters): Alstom, Mannheim, Trapaga Spain
- Bogies: Alstom, Siegen
- Driver desks: Alstom Hennigsdorf, Alstom Kassel
- Locomotive bodies and frames: Alstom, Wrocław (Poland)
- Cooling components: Behr GmbH & Co, Stuttgart
- Brakes: Knorr, Munich
- Transformer: ABB Sécheron, Geneva (Switzerland)
- Climate control systems (heating, humidity, etc.): Liebherr in Korneburg (Austria)

== TRAXX dual voltage AC versions ==
TRAXX F140 AC / P160 AC TRAXX F140 AC2
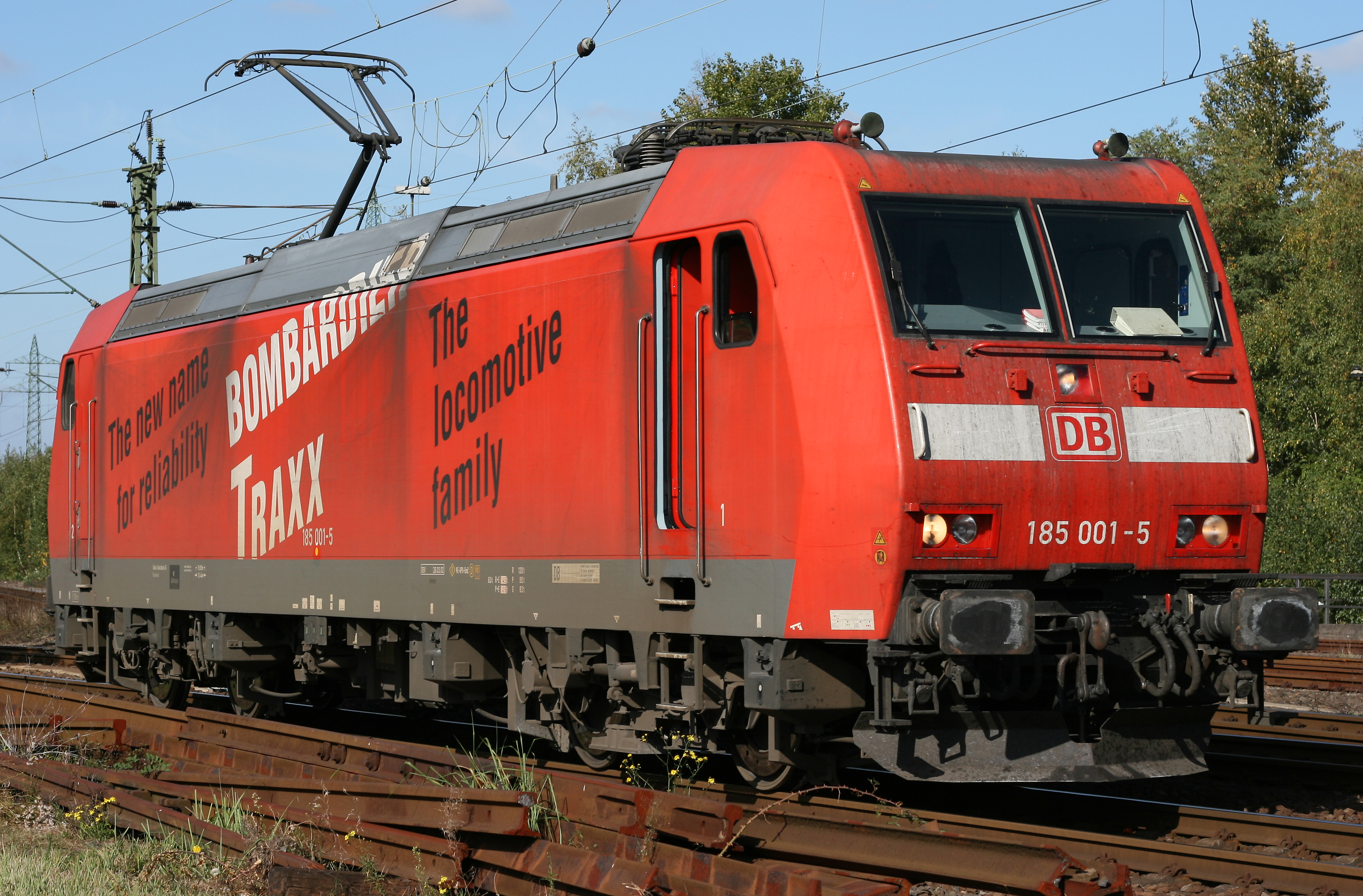
- TRAXX F140 AC, DB Class 185
Type and origin
- Power type: Electric
- Build date: F140 AC / P160 AC : 1999-January 2006; TRAXX F140 AC2 / P160 AC2 :
- Total produced: F140 AC1: 312; P140 AC1: 20; P160 AC1: 42; Total: 377; F140 AC2 : 300+ P160 AC2 : 68; Grand Total : 745+
Specifications
- Loco weight: 84 t (83 long tons; 93 short tons) (82 t or 81 long tons or 90 short tons)
- Electric system/s: 15 kV 16 2/3 Hz AC, 25 kV/50 Hz AC; Catenary
- Current pickup: Pantograph
Performance figures
- Maximum speed: F140 AC / F 140 AC2 : 140 km/h (87 mph); P160 AC : 160 km/h (99 mph); P140 AC (for CFL) : 140 km/h (87 mph)p140lux
- Tractive effort: 300 kN (67,000 lb_{f})
Career
- Power class: 5.6 MW (7,500 hp)

=== TRAXX F140 AC ===
The TRAXX F140 AC operates on AC overhead lines. They can work under both the 15 kV/16.7 Hz and the 25 kV/50 Hz AC systems. As built they are configured for future ETCS / ERTMS train control and safety systems.

The 200 units built between 2001 and 2003 for Deutsche Bahn were classified as DBAG Class 185, or DBAG Class 185.1 once production switched to the TRAXX F140 AC2 design. A further 57 units were built for various European leasing companies, and were classified in Germany as Class 185.5.

Another 35 units were produced for the freight business area of the Swiss Federal Railways, SBB Cargo (SBB Re482), and 20 units for Swiss private railway BLS AG (BLS Re485). The Swiss locomotives differ from the German versions in details such as pantographs (2 more, with smaller contacts for running under Swiss catenary (not because of tunnels)) and Switzerland specific safety systems in addition to the German systems.

=== TRAXX P140 AC ===
In Luxembourg CFL operates 20 locomotives.

=== TRAXX P160 AC ===
The TRAXX P160 AC is the passenger version of this class, with a correspondingly higher top speed of 160 km/h. A lower unsprung mass was achieved by using hollow shaft final drives instead of the axle hung motor arrangement of the 140 km/h maximum speed versions. The bogies and drive unit are the same as used in the DBAG Class 146.0.

In Germany, DB Regio acquired 32 units between 2003 and 2005, where they are designated DBAG Class 146.1.

Additionally, (Landesnahverkehrsgesellschaft Niedersachsen mbH (LVNG), (Hannover) ) has 10 units which are leased to the railway company metronom (operating as ME146).

=== TRAXX F140 AC2 ===
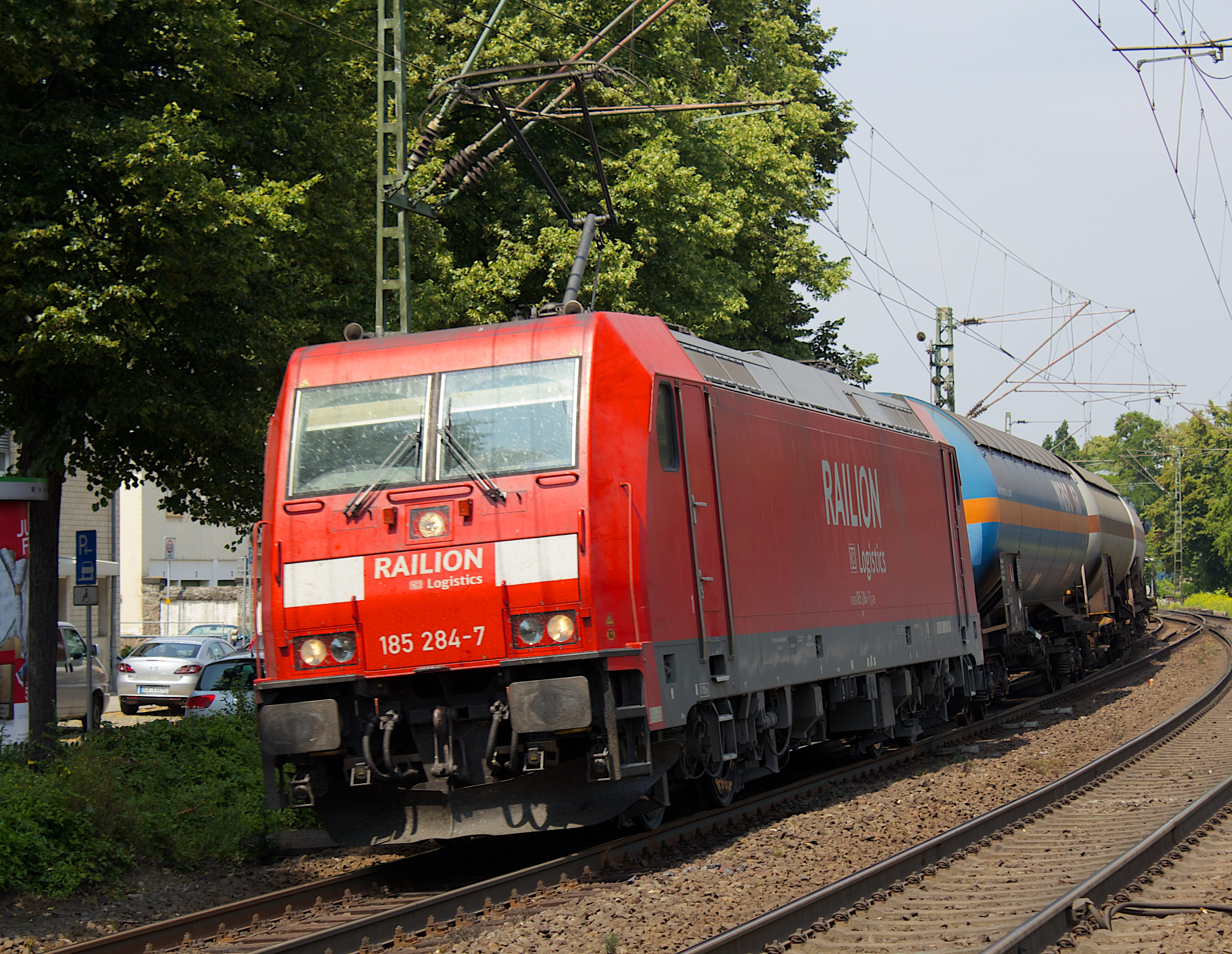
An F140 AC2 with a goods train near Königswinter, 2013.

The first AC member of the TRAXX 2 family, which featured carbodies with improved crashworthiness and water-cooled IGBT-based inverters, was the demonstrator loco 185 561, delivered in May 2004. It was produced ahead of the main tranche of TRAXX F140 AC2 locomotives for homologation of the class in Germany.

Another demonstrator TRAXX F140 AC2, 185 568 was used for tests on the then new HSL-Zuid in 2006. Subsequently, it was used for tests of the ETCS system.

Both demonstrator locomotives were eventually sold to private operators for normal use.

The remaining 200 of the 400 Class 185 freight locomotives ordered for DB Cargo were to be of this type, and the new versions were given the subclass designation DBAG Class 185.2. Since this large order represented the main body of production at Bombardier's Kassel plant, any further private orders for the AC locomotives would be included into the F140AC2 production line - thus the original F140 AC type effectively ceased production when the production of DB Cargo's (by then renamed Railion) Class 185.2 began.

The locomotives operated by SBB Cargo are designated Re482.2.

=== TRAXX P160 AC2 ===
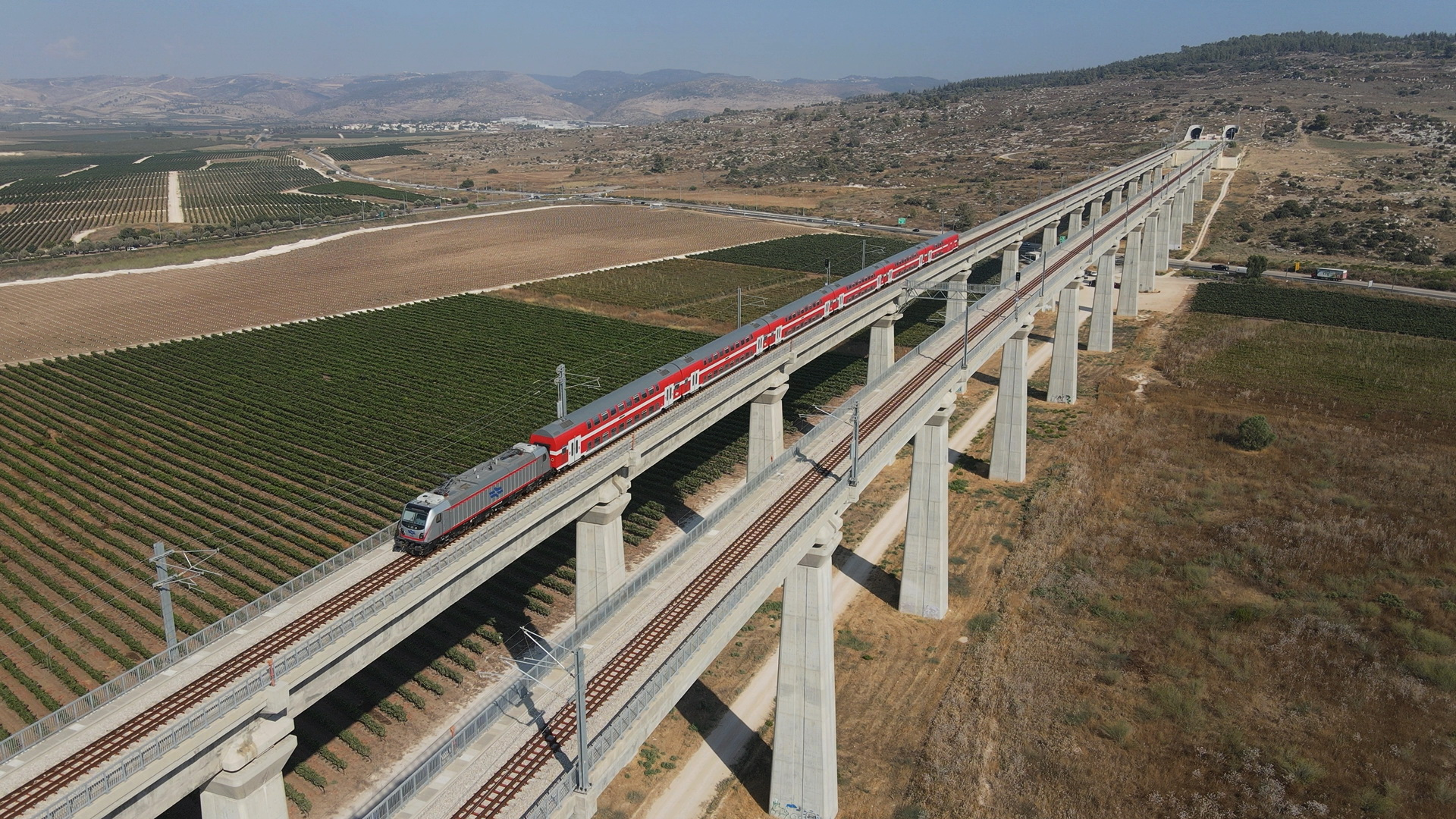
Train with TRAXX P160 AC3 passes Ayalon Valley, Israel

Alongside the F140 AC2 locomotives, the passenger versions received the same improvements. DB Regio received 47 units between 2005 and 2006; as with the freight version the '.2' subclass was used to distinguish these new versions - the Deutsche Bahn locomotives being classified as Class 146.2, following on from the Class 146. A number of smaller orders have been received, including more units for the metronom railway - procured via LNVG. DB Fernverkehr, the German Railways branch which operates Intercity services, ordered 27 more Class 146.2 locos on 12 January 2011. The locos will start service in December 2013.

=== TRAXX P160 AC3 ===
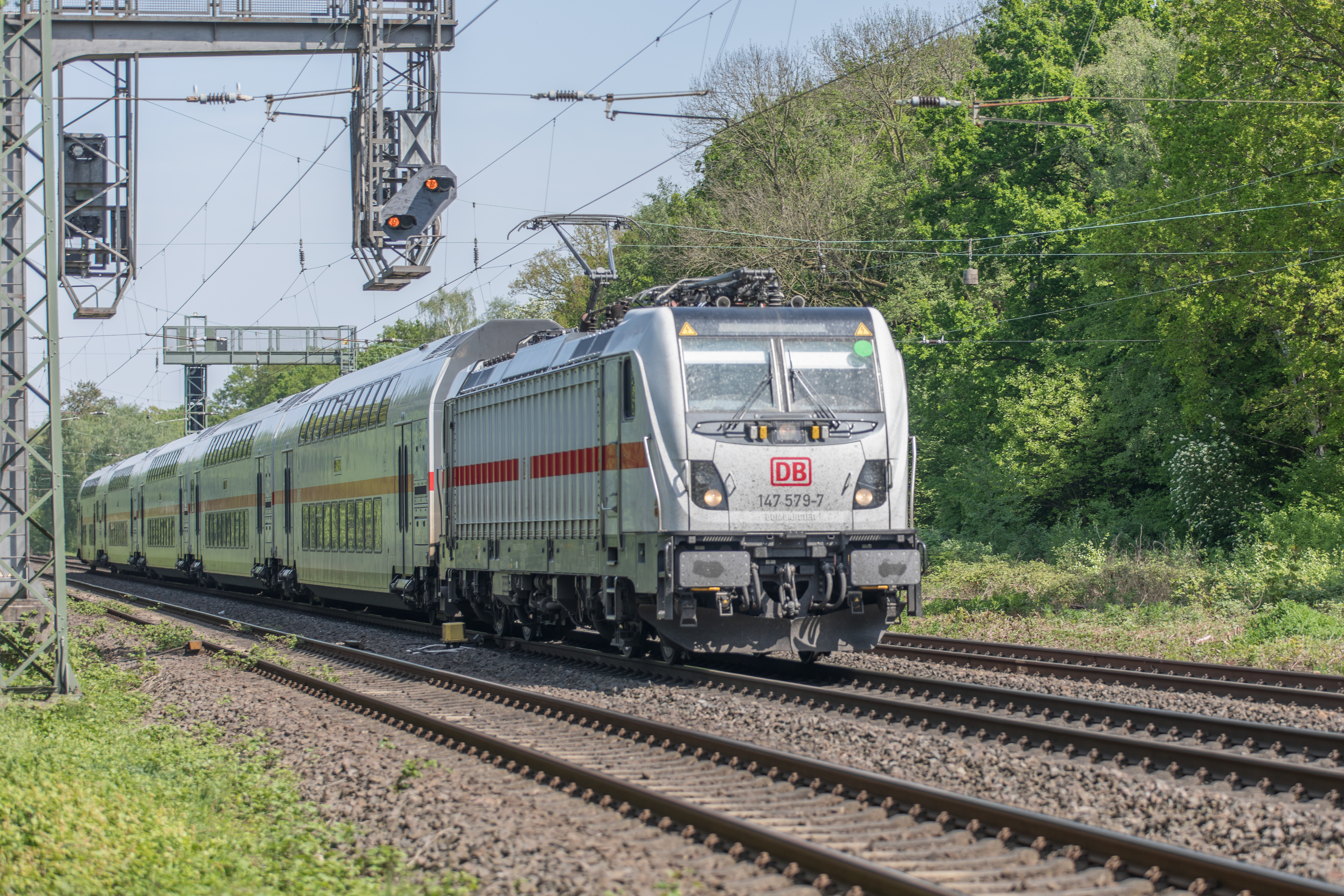
TRAXX P160 AC3 pulling an IC2 train, operated by DB Fernverkehr AG (DB AG Class 147.5)

In 2012, Bombardier presented the third generation TRAXX. Its exterior is different from previous generations. DB Fernverkehr took delivery of its first TRAXX AC3 locomotives (Class 147.5) in 2018 in a batch of 17. According to a January 2020 IRJ article, DB Fernverkehr refused to take delivery of the second batch of TRAXX AC3 locomotives in 2019 due to software-related issues. The rail-transport company uses its TRAXX AC3 locomotives for its IC2 trains (as seen in the photograph on the right). Models operated by DB Regio are classed as DB Class 147. The TRAXX AC3 has an installed power of 5.6 MW, and a top speed of 160 km/h.

=== Operators and leasing companies ===
As of 2010, production of the AC2 versions is still ongoing, with the DB Schenker order expected to be completed in late 2009. Along with German companies the AC locomotives have orders from Scandinavian countries and from Hungary – where the Hungarian State railways (MÁV) (Magyar Államvasutak) has placed an order for 25 (and optional 25) P160 AC2 machines.

Type	Operator	Number	Delivery date	Class	Notes
TRAXX F140 AC	DB Cargo (then Railion, inherited by DB Schenker)	200	2001–2003	185.1	Part of an order of 400, the second batch of 200 were produced as TRAXX F140 AC2 (DBAG Class 185.2) Parts of the class are fitted for operations into Switzerland/Austria/France
TRAXX F140 AC	SBB Cargo	35	2002–2003	Re482	
TRAXX F140 AC	BLS AG	20	2002-2004; 2006	Re485	10 ordered by BLS Lötschbergbahn AG, after merger with Regionalverkehr Mittelland AG (RM) to form BLS AG; a further 10 locomotives
TRAXX F140 AC	CB Rail	3		185.5	Leasing company, formerly Porterbrook All leased to Veolia Cargo Deutschland
TRAXX F140 AC	Alpha Trains	34		185.5	Leasing company
TRAXX F140 AC	MRCE	11		185.5	Leasing company Some equipped to operate in France
TRAXX F140 AC	Rail4Chem	8		185.5	
TRAXX F140 AC	ITL Eisenbahngesellschaft	1		185.5	
TRAXX P140 AC	CFL	20		4000	Units for passenger and freight work – top speed of 140 km/h, also fitted with the necessary equipment for passenger trains.
TRAXX P160 AC	DB Regio	32	2003–2005	146.1	
TRAXX P160 AC	LNVG	10		ME146	Leased to the railway company metronom
TRAXX F140 AC2	Railion since Sept. 2007; DB Schenker	199	2004-	185.2	From 185-205 onwards following locomotives were delivered with DB logistics logos, from 185-360 onwards locomotives were delivered in DB Schenker livery 185-321 to 185-337 fitted for work in Sweden via Denmark for subsidiary Railion Denmark
TRAXX F140 AC2	SBB Cargo	15	2006	Re482.2	For operations in Germany, Switzerland, and after September 2006, Austria. Order included second-hand former Bombardier demonstrator loco 185-561
TRAXX F140 AC2	MRCE	11	2005/6	185.2	For use in Germany, Austria and Switzerland
TRAXX F140 AC2	Alpha Trains	25+	2006-	185.2	Leasing company, customers include HGK. Most for work in Germany–Austria, also Switzerland, Hungary.
TRAXX F140 AC2	Alpha Trains	10	2009	CE119 or El 19	Leasing customer CargoNet, locomotive go in Norway and Sweden.
TRAXX F140 AC2	CBRail	16	2007–2009	241	Leasing/finance company. Customers include HGK
TRAXX F140 AC2	HectorRail	10	2007–2009	241	For operations in Sweden, Denmark and Germany. Fleet includes former ETCS test machine 185-568. Units also leased. 241-004 named R2-D2
TRAXX F140 AC2	ITL Eisenbahngesellschaft	1	2005	185.5	ITL 185–562, for use in Germany and Austria
TRAXX F140 AC2	Green Cargo	22	2010	Re	16 units for operation between central and northern Sweden, 6 for operation between Germany and Sweden through Denmark
TRAXX F140 AC2	Others (Orders still ongoing as of 2009)	17	2007-		hvle 2 units, Eurocom 2 units for Hungary as Class 481, Beacon Rail 12 units for leasing.
TRAXX P160 AC2	DB Regio	47	2005–2006	146.2	
TRAXX P160 AC2	DB Fernverkehr	27	2013–2014	146.2	
TRAXX P160 AC2	MÁV	25	2011–2012	480	001-025
TRAXX P160 AC2	LNVG	17	2005–2007	ME146/2	Acquired by LVNG for metronom railway company in Germany
TRAXX P160 AC2	Connex now Veolia	4	2006	146.5	Initially acquired for Nord-Ostsee-Bahn, since transferred to Veolia Deutschland and used by Regionalbahn Bitterfeld-Berlin and others including freight work for Veolia Cargo Deutschland
TRAXX P160 AC3	Israel Railways	62	2017		Ordered in 2015. 25 kV 50 Hz AC operation. 6 MW electric output. Initial delivery began in 2017.

== TRAXX AC/DC versions ==
TRAXX F140 MS
Type and origin
- Power type: Electric
- Build date: F140 MS : 2004-present
- Total produced: 220+
Specifications
- Loco weight: 85 t (84 long tons; 94 short tons)
- Electric system/s: 15 kV/16.7 Hz, 25 kV/50 Hz AC; 1.5 kV, 3 kV DC; Catenary
- Current pickup: Pantograph
Performance figures
- Maximum speed: F140 MS : 140 km/h (87 mph)
- Tractive effort: 300 kN (67,000 lb_{f})
Career
- Power class: 5.6 MW (7,500 hp) (4.0 MW or 5,400 hp on 1.5 kV supply)

=== TRAXX F140 MS ===
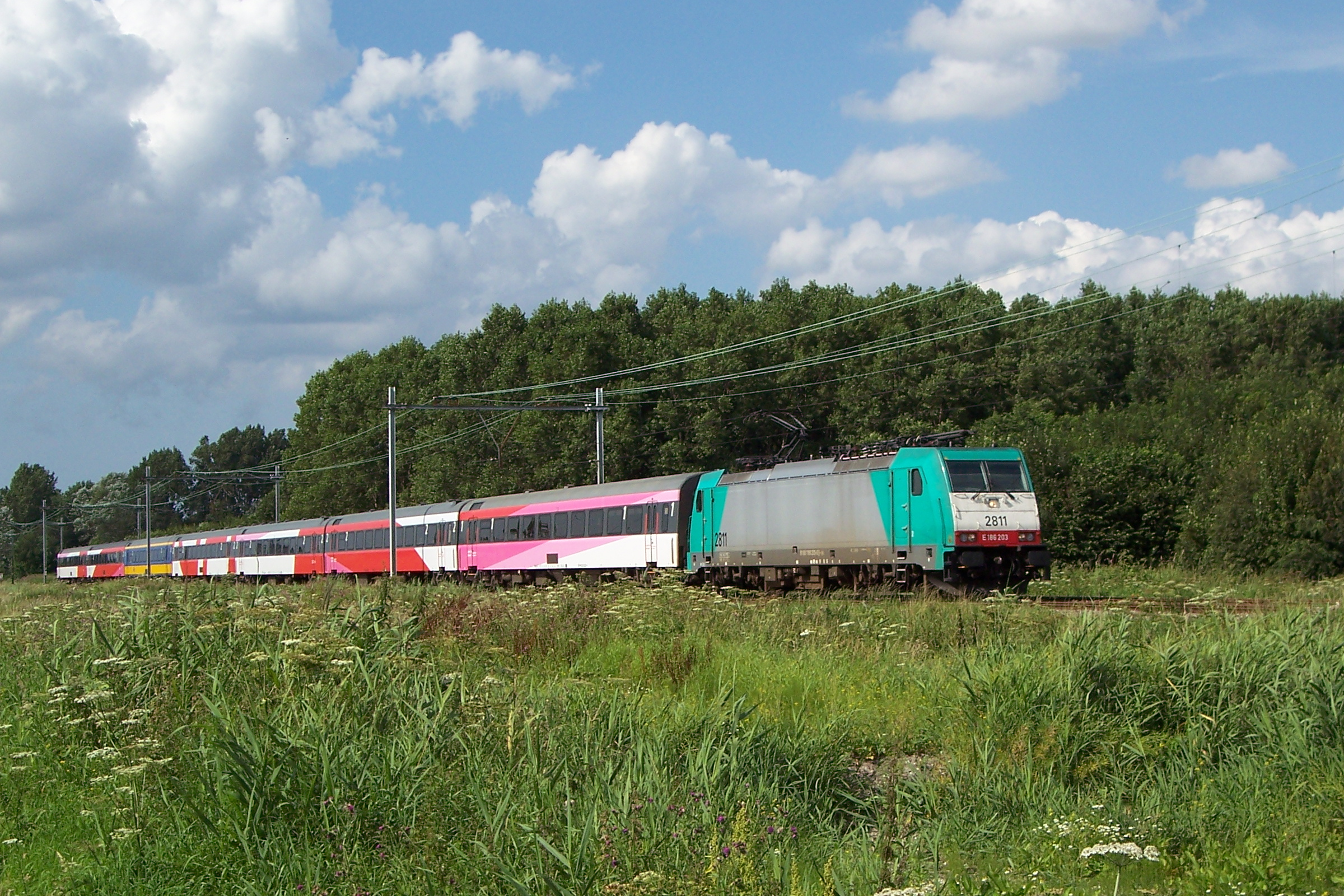
NMBS/SNCB Class 28 multi-system TRAXX with InterCity Amsterdam - Brussels

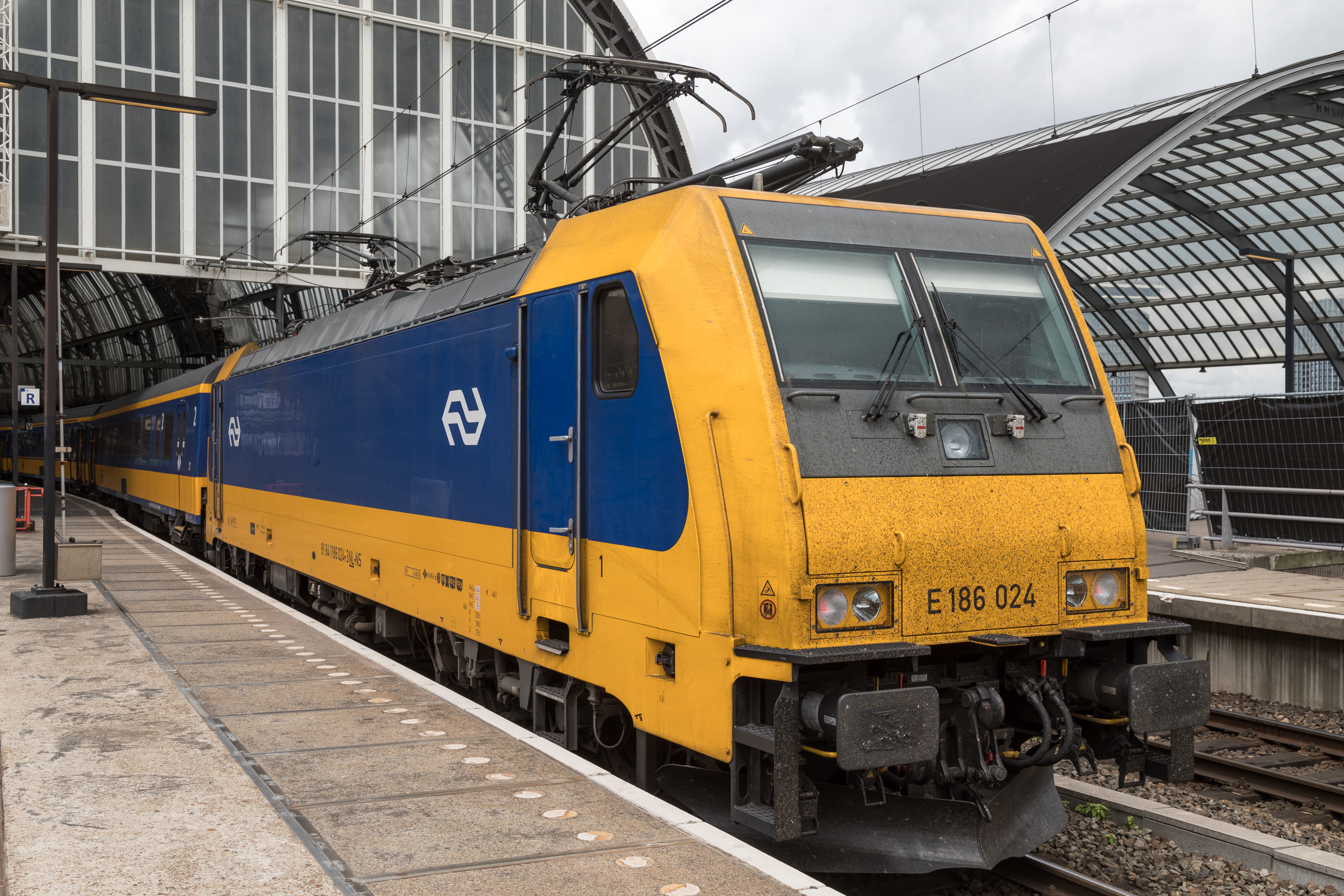
NS E 186 014 in Amsterdam CS

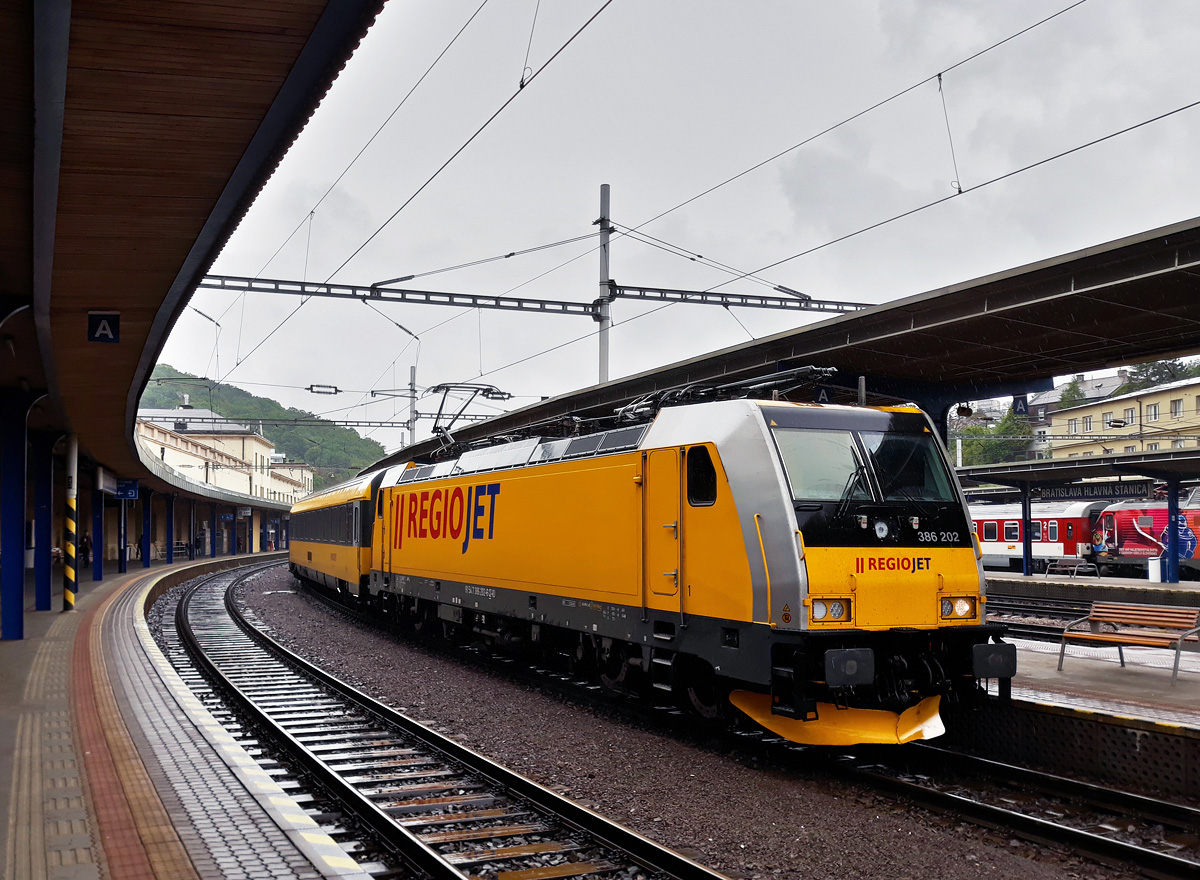
F140 MS2 as Czech class 386 with InterCity Prague - Bratislava private operator RegioJet in final station, 2019.

The first multi-system TRAXX unit that could operate under AC and DC electrified catenaries, SBB Re484 001, was introduced at the same time 185 561 was introduced as demonstrator locomotive for the F140 AC2 type. In addition to the 15 kV/16.7 Hz and 25 kV/50 Hz AC supplies, the new model could also be operated under 3 kV DC overhead electrification. Later models also supported a 1.5 kV DC supply. This locomotive for SBB was also the first TRAXX variant with individual axle control in place of individual bogie control. The general type name given by Bombardier was TRAXX F140 MS.

Apart from the different pantographs, electrical systems for DC operation, the F140 MS types are identical to the contemporary dual voltage versions. However, under 1.5 kV DC, the maximum available power is limited to 4.0 MW, although this does not affect the maximum tractive effort, which is limited by other factors. As a consequence of the additional equipment required, the locomotives weigh approximately 1 tonne more than their dual voltage relatives.

The locomotives are designed for cross border operations; the addition of 1.5 kV and 3 kV DC operability potentially allows the locomotives to operate in Poland and Italy. In practice the delivered locomotives were used for work into Switzerland and Italy, and equipped with either the Italian safety system SCMT or ETCS.

Post 2006 many more of these multi-system locomotives were produced, this time with some for use in the Benelux countries, as well as France and Poland, with further units being produced for Swiss/Italian traffic. In Poland, locomotives used by PKP Cargo have been designated as the EU43 class (this designation was originally meant for what is now known as the FS Class E.412, which was initially intended for Poland but now mainly operated by Italy). Units hired from Alpha Trains cargo to SNCB (Belgium) have also received the class number SNCB Class 28

In July 2018, Bombardier introduced the third generation of TRAXX multi-system locomotives, named the MS3, which in addition to carrying over compatibility with the four electrification systems introduced an onboard engine to enable travel over short distances of non-electrified track.

Type	Operator	Number	Delivery date	Class	Notes
TRAXX F140 MS	SBB Cargo	18+3	2004/6	Re484	First order for the multi-system locomotives. Units fitted with Swiss and Italian safety systems only. Initial units fitted with Integra, ZUB262, and RS4 Codici safety systems, later all fitted with ETCS and SCMT safety systems.
TRAXX F140 MS	MRCE	5	2006	Re484	Leasing company locomotives. Only homologated and fitted with safety systems for Italy and Switzerland. Numbered Re484.901 onwards.
TRAXX F140 MS2 (post 2006 version)	Alpha Trains	105	2006-	E 186 also EU43 (PL) and SNCB Class 28 (BE)	Leasing company. Locomotives delivered and certified for a variety of operations - some for (NL/DE/AT/CH/IT or DE/PL or DE/AT/NL/BE. Others certified for 160 km/h operations on HSL-Zuid. 6 on long-term lease to PKP Cargo (Poland) - designated as class EU43 numbers EU43 001 to EU43 006. Also as SNCB Class 28 in Belgium.
TRAXX F140 MS2 (post 2006 version)	CBrail	35	2007-	E 186	Leasing company. Version built for either operations via Germany to the Low countries, Poland, or Italy (trans-alpine)
TRAXX F140 MS2 (post 2006 version)	EuroCargoRail	20	2008-	E 186	For work in France, also to Germany via Belgium
TRAXX F140 MS2 (post 2006 version)	BLS Cargo	10	2008-	Re484	For transalpine routes via Italy/Austria/Switzerland/Germany
TRAXX F140 MS2 (post 2006 version)	Nederlandse Spoorwegen	45	2015-	E 186	For work in Netherlands (Intercity Service and HSL-Zuid (160 km/h)) and Belgium
TRAXX F140 MS2 (post 2006 version)	others	30+	2008/9+		ITL Eisenbahngesellschaft 2 units, Veolia 6 units, Railpool more than 20 on order
TRAXX MS3	TX Logistik	40			Ordered in July 2018, with options for 25 more
TRAXX MS3	Akiem	10			Ordered in July 2018
TRAXX MS3	ČD Cargo	10		Class 388	Ordered in August 2018, with options for 40 more
TRAXX MS3	RegioJet	13			Ordered in February 2023, when delivered, RegioJet will become the largest operator of TRAXX MS3 locomotives.

=== TRAXX P200 MS ===
Type	Operator	Number	Delivery date	Class	Notes
TRAXX MS3	NMBS/SNCB	24	2025–2027	Class 17	24 units ordered in February 2022 by the Belgian Railways, part of a framework agreement for up to 50 units.
TRAXX MS3	CFR Călători	16	2025–2026	Class 188	Ordered in January 2024 by the Romania’s Railway Reform Authority (ARF) for passenger services.

== TRAXX DC versions ==
TRAXX F140 DC and TRAXX F160 DC
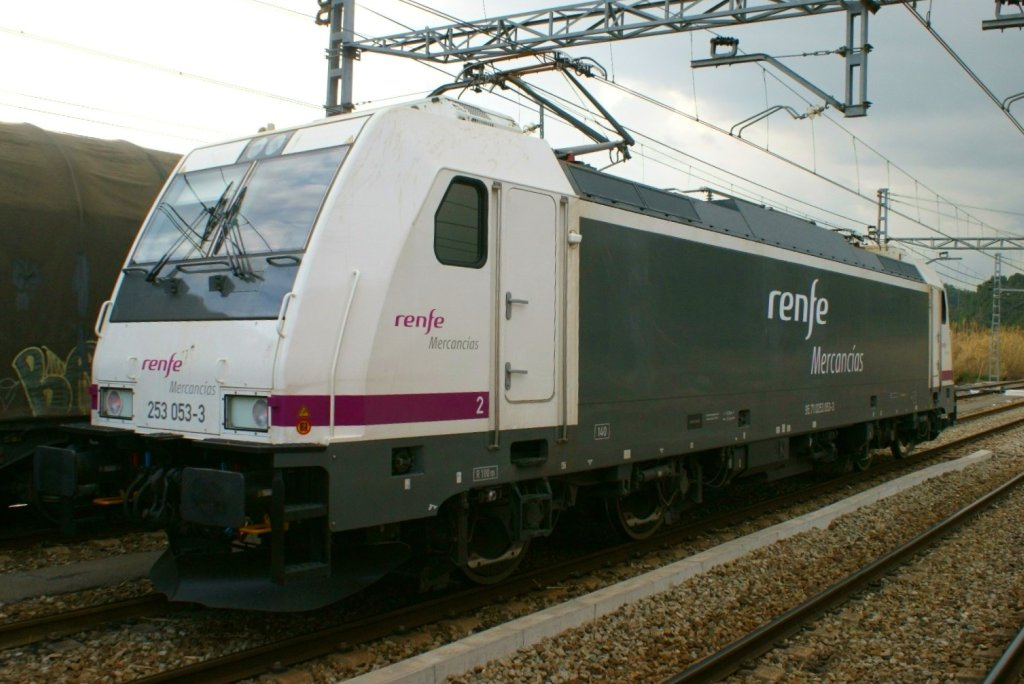
- Renfe 253.053 at Castellbisbal (Spain)
Type and origin
- Power type: Electric
Specifications
- Gauge: 1,435 mm (4 ft 8 1/2 in); 1,668 mm (5 ft 5 21/32 in) (Spain)
- Loco weight: 81 t (80 long tons; 89 short tons)
- Electric system/s: 3 kV DC Catenary
- Current pickup: Pantograph
Performance figures
- Power output: 5.6 MW (7,500 hp)
- Tractive effort: 300 kN (67,000 lb_{f})

Once Bombardier completed the first TRAXX F140 MS, a single-voltage version for DC overhead wires could be produced cost effectively by leaving away the AC equipment of a multi-system locomotive, and Bombardier began seeking a launch customer in 2004. In 2005, Angel Trains (today Alpha Trains) placed an order for 10 DC electric locomotives with Bombardier. The first machine, designated E483 001, was produced in August 2006 at Bombardier's plant in Kassel.

Later machines were built at Bombardier's plant in Vado Ligure in Italy, which has become the official site for production of DC versions of the TRAXX locomotives.

The weight of the TRAXX F140 DC is slightly reduced compared to the AC machines which require a particularly heavy high-voltage transformer for use with the low 16.7 Hz frequency of the 15 kV AC system. The machines are built to the same specifications as the rest of the TRAXX family, but only have equipment for 3 kV DC - making them suitable for internal work in Italy, Spain and Poland. If necessary the machines can be rebuilt for multi-system use.

Renfe Mercancías, the freight division of Renfe Operadora ordered 100 locomotives for freight use to be designated RENFE Class 253; these are the first TRAXX locomotives to be built to anything other than standard gauge.

Additionally Trenitalia has ordered 42 locomotives for freight use, which will be operated at up to 160 km/h.

Type	Operator	Number	Delivery date	Class	Notes
TRAXX F140 DC	Alpha Trains	10+10	2006-7; 2009	E483	Leasing company
TRAXX F140 DC	others	19	2008-2012	E 483 series	Nordcargo (DB Schenker Rail) (5+3 units), Ferrovia Emilia Romagna (FER) (2 units), Sistemi Territoriali (2 units), GTS (3+2 units), APS Savona (2 units). All for Italian operations.
TRAXX F140 DC; Iberian gauge	Renfe Operadora	100	2007–2010	Class 253	55 machines to be built at Vado Ligure, the remaining 45 to be assembled from parts at Villaverde (nr. Madrid). These machines have headlights above cab window and roof mounted air-conditioning.
TRAXX F140 DC; Iberian gauge	COMSA Rail Transport	3	2009	Class 253	In September 2009, these units were outshopped in Vado Ligure, Italy, and transported to Spain.
TRAXX F160 DC	Trenitalia (Mercitalia)	42	2017	E 483 series	Freight locomotives with top speed of 160 km/h.
TRAXX P160 DC	Masovian Railways	11	2011	E 583	For push&pull Bombardier Double-deck Coaches

== TRAXX diesel versions ==
TRAXX F140 DE, TRAXX P160 DE
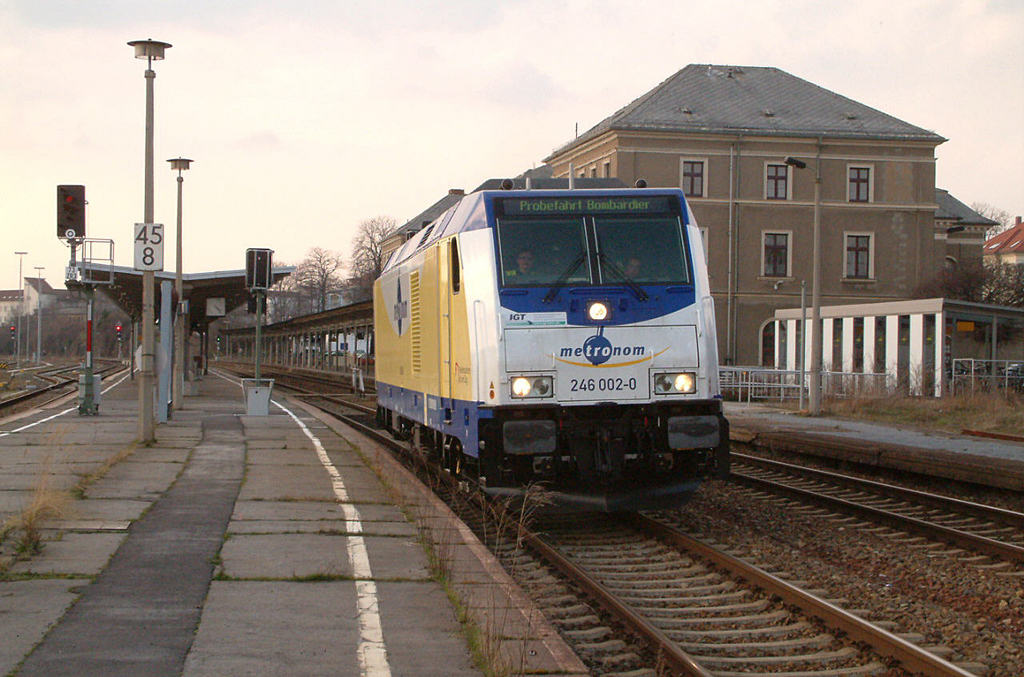
- metronom TRAXX P160 DE locomotive
Type and origin
- Power type: Diesel
- Build date: 2006–present
- Total produced: 21+
Specifications
- Loco weight: 80 t (79 long tons; 88 short tons)
- Fuel capacity: 4,000 L (880 imp gal; 1,100 US gal)
- Engine type: MTU 16V 4000 R41L
Performance figures
- Maximum speed: 140 or 160 or 200 km/h (87 or 99 or 124 mph) (depending on configuration)
- Power output: 2.2 MW (3,000 hp)
- Tractive effort: 270 kN (61,000 lb_{f})

The diesel version of the TRAXX platform was introduced with the 2E version of the TRAXX platform. In the diesel version, the fuel tank occupies the same space as the transformer in the electric versions, centrally and below the main frame members. Installed motor power is 2.2MW. The diesel and electric TRAXX locomotives share the same driver cabin and control desk, body, bogies, and drive system. The maximum tractive effort is slight reduced by 300 kN to 270 kN due to the lower power of the diesel engine.

The first order for the diesel passenger version (designated as Class 246, Bombardier's designation TRAXX P160 DE) came from metronom via the leasing company LNVG. The company already used TRAXX electric locomotives and required locomotives for the non-electrified Hamburg-Cuxhaven line. 11 locomotives were ordered in 2005, delivery would take place in 2007. The first three engines were built in 2006 for type certification, with one machine being presented officially at the InnoTrans 2006 railfair; they were in service by late 2007.

Leasing company CBrail was the first to order the freight version (as Class 285, Bombardier's designation TRAXX F140 DE) in 2006, the first locomotive was delivery in mid-2007, and had been certified for use by 2008. On 5 December 2008, SNCF Fret placed an order for 45 TRAXX F140 DE locomotives, the order being valued at 160 million Euros. The class are to be designated as SNCF Class BB 476000. The contract includes an option for a further 35 locomotives.

In April 2011 DB Regio awarded Bombardier a framework agreement for up to 200 Traxx DE Multi-Engine locomotives worth a total of €600m; an initial 20 locomotives will be delivered from mid-2013 at a cost of €62m. These genset locomotives will have four 540 kW (720 hp) diesel engines in place of one large engine, with the aim of reducing fuel consumption and exhaust emissions because the engines can be shut down when not needed.

Type	Operator	Number	Delivery date	Class	Notes
TRAXX P160 DE	LNVG	11	2007	246	Acquired by LNVG for use by metronom
TRAXX F140 DE	CBrail	10	2008	285	Leasing company, Operators include HVLE, ITL Eisenbahngesellschaft
TRAXX F140 DE	Akiem /SNCF	45		SNCF BB 476000	Order of 80, with last 35 as an option.
TRAXX DE ME	DB Regio	23	2013-	245	Options for total of 200
TRAXX DE ME	DB Fernverkehr	7	2016	245	As above.

== TRAXX dual-mode version ==
On 10 May 2011, Bombardier announced a new TRAXX electro-diesel model, dubbed the "Last Mile Diesel", that combined a standard AC propulsion system with a diesel engine to power the locomotive in light-duty applications such as operating on non-electrified sidings or yards. The design was based on Bombardier's experience with building the ALP-45DP. At the time the new model was introduced, a launch order for five units was announced by Railpool, which had signed the order in late 2010.

== See also ==
A number of other locomotives built by Bombardier have been derived from or share some technical features with the TRAXX platform:

- DBAG Class 101 - ABB-ordered, Adtranz-built express locomotive with electronics similar to that of early TRAXX locomotives except for individual axle control
- FS Class E412 - DC locomotive built at Vado Ligure works, first-delivered member of the Eco2000 family
- FS Class E464 - single cabin Italian locomotive also built at Vado Ligure
- Iore - twin section heavy-haul twin locomotive with three axles per bogie and a 30 t axle load
- AVE Class 102 - Spanish manufacturer Talgo's Talgo350 high-speed trains for Spanish railways Renfe, with powerheads made by a consortium led by Adtranz/Bombardier
- ALP-46 - built for New Jersey Transit, based on the DBAG Class 101
- ALP-46A - also being built for NJ Transit, based on the ALP-46 and the TRAXX 2E
- ALP-45DP electro-diesel locomotive - also being built for Montreal's AMT and New York-area commuter hauler NJ Transit, based on the ALP-46A
- List of České dráhy locomotive classes

== Sources ==
- Bombardier Transportation bombardier.com
