= Alpha Trains =

European rolling stock company

- Industry: Rolling stock leasing
- Predecessor: Angel Trains
- Founded: August 2008
- Headquarters: Luxembourg City, Luxembourg
- Area served: Europe
- Owner: Stichting Pensioenfonds ABP (41%); Arcus Infrastructure Partners; PGGM; Swiss Life Asset Managers
- Website: www.alphatrains.eu

Alpha Trains is a rolling stock leasing company operating in the European Union and European Free Trade Association (EFTA) regions of mainland Europe.

It was created as Angel Trains International as a spin-off from the British rolling stock leaser Angel Trains in August 2008; as such, its former continental European assets were reallocated to this newly created entity. In January 2010, the Alpha Trains branding was adopted by the company. Through the 2010s, the company expanded its presence with a series of acquisitions, buying up rolling stock of the Royal Bank of Scotland (RBS) and Société Générale. New-build locomotives and multiple units were also bought in from manufacturers such as Stadler Rail and Alstom, while existing assets were subject to retrofits to improve their capabilities.

Between 2019 and 2021, the ownership of Alpha Trains underwent a series of changes; while the Arcus European Infrastructure Fund and AMP Capital sold their shares to APG, the Public Sector Pension Investment Board also sold its stake to PGGM Infrastructure Fund. By December 2019, Alpha Trains' portfolio consisted of 363 locomotives and 432 trainsets.

== History ==
The origins of Alpha Trains can be traced back to the British rolling stock leasing company Angel Trains, which was formed in March 1994 as a subsidiary of British Rail in preparation for the privatisation of British Rail during the 1990s. The company developed a sizable portfolio of rolling stock in both the British and continental European markets. In June 2008, Angel Trains was acquired by a consortium of Babcock & Brown, AMP Capital, Arcus European Infrastructure Fund and Deutsche Bank at a reported cost of £3.6 billion.

The 2008 takeover promptly led to a major restructuring of the business' activities. It was under this initiative that all of its international operations and inventory were split out into the newly created subsidiary Angel Trains International. During January 2010, the entity was rebranded, adopting the Alpha Trains name.

Throughout the 2010s, Alpha Trains expanded its presence in the European market, making several large acquisitions towards this goal. In January 2014, it was announced that it had agreed to acquire 137 locomotives and 65 multiple units from the British banking group Royal Bank of Scotland (RBS). The deal reportedly increased Alpha Trains' portfolio to cover roughly 370 locomotives and 300 multiple units. During April 2016, the firm acquired 89 Alstom-built regional multiple units from subsidiaries of the French financial services firm Société Générale; this reportedly increased Alpha Train's passenger-orientated inventory by 25 percent, totalling 436 assets at the time.

In January 2017, Alpha Trains arranged a green private refinancing deal on accumulated debt from the acquisition of environmentally-friendly electric trains; this move was described as a world first for this type of company. In June 2018, it was announced that the launch customers for the Stadler Euro Dual electro-diesel locomotive were the French freight operator VFLI and Alpha Trains; at the time, a total of 30 of the preceding Stadler Euro series of locomotive were in Alpha Trains' inventory, being leased to Spanish and Portuguese rail freight operators.

During December 2019, the Dutch pension fund APG acquired a 41% shareholding in Alpha Trains from the Arcus European Infrastructure Fund. In January 2021, it was announced that AMP Capital had agreed to sell its stake in the firm to APG, while the Canadian Crown Corporation Public Sector Pension Investment Board was also selling its large stake in Alpha Trains to the Dutch pension administrator PGGM Infrastructure Fund; both had been long-term shareholders in the company since its 2008 establishment.

In May 2021, Alpha Trains confirmed a retrofit programme involving 77 locomotives, comprising 55 Bombardier Traxx 186 locomotives, along with eight Vossloh-G1206- and 14 Vossloh-G2000 locomotives; Alstom will upgrade them for compatibility with the European Train Control System Level 2 Baseline 3 Release 2, enabling their used under modern signalling. In May 2022, it was announced that Alpha Trains had signed an eight-year maintenance contract with Alstom for the latter to provide locomotive maintenance for 70 of the former's locomotives, based in Belgium, the Netherlands, Luxembourg and Germany. That same month, the firm launched its new AlphaNow customer portal, allowing operators to book individual locomotives via a live and transparent website.

== Assets ==
As of December 2019, Alpha Trains owned 363 locomotives and 432 trainsets that were leased to operators in 17 European countries.

- Passenger trains and locomotives
  - Stadler FLIRT and Stadler Regio-Shuttle RS1
  - Siemens Desiro
  - Bombardier Talent
  - Alstom Lint
  - Siemens ER20 and Bombardier Traxx locomotives
- Freight locomotives
  - Bombardier TRAXX AC and MS locomotives
  - Bombardier TRAXX DC locomotives
  - Vossloh G2000, G1700, G1206 and G1000
  - Vossloh Euro 4000 and EMD Class 66 locomotives
