= Mitsui Rail Capital =

MRCE Logo

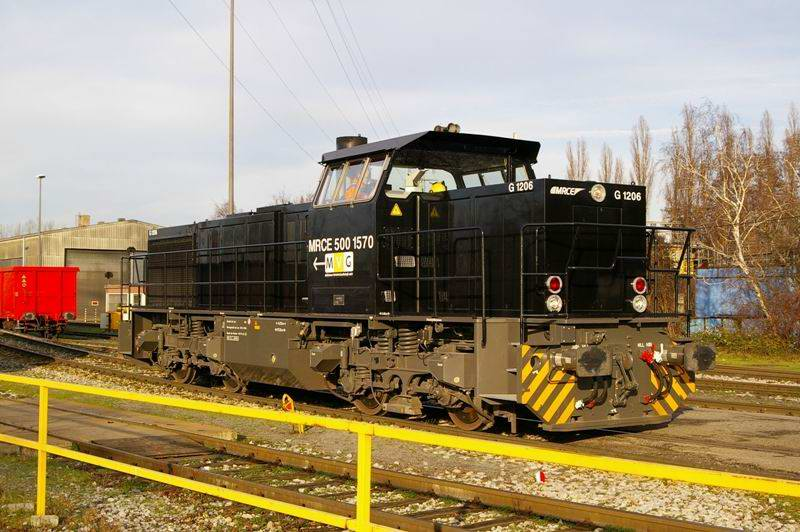
Vossloh G1206 locomotive in glossy black Mitsui (MRCE) livery

Mitsui Rail Capital (MRC) is a rolling stock leasing company. It was established by the Japanese conglomerate Mitsui & Co, the company's main activities have been the purchase, renting, and leasing of railway freight cars and locomotives.

MRC has been active in various parts of the globe; local subsidiaries such as Mitsui Rail Capital Latin America and Mitsui Rail Capital Europe BV (MRCE) were established to operate in the South American and European markets respectively. Rolling stock has typically been acquired directly from their manufacturers, however, other means of expanding the company's operations have been pursued on occasion, such as the acquisition of Siemens Dispolok in 2006. By 2022, MRC operated a fleet of 332 electric locomotives.

During 2023, Mitsui & Co were bought out of MRC's ownership and the company was rebranded as Modern Rail Capital to reflect this change. Later that same year, MRCE were sold to, and promptly integrated with, the British rolling stock leasor Beacon Rail. As a result, the company has undergone considerable restructuring during this time.

== Corporate affairs and ownership ==
In 2015, MRC was reorganised as a joint venture between Mitsue & Co and JA Mitsui Leasing Ltd. (JAML). During February 2021, it was announced that terms had been agreed with JAML to take full ownership of MRC, making it a wholly owned subsidiary of JAML; the new parent company stated that this move would help it expand its presence in the North American market. In July of that year, MRC's North American operations were rebranded as Modern Rail Capital.

In August 2023, MRC's European operations, branded as MRCE, begun to be transferred to the British rolling stock leasor Beacon Rail; three months later, operations of the two companies had been fully integrated ahead of schedule.

== Regional activities ==
=== Latin America ===
Mitsui Rail Capital Latin America (Mitsui Rail Capital Participacões Ltda.) (MRCLA) was established in São Paulo, Brazil, in November 2004.

MRCLA's main area of activity has been the rental of freight cars, particularly for iron ore and agricultural products. The company also has the intention of acquiring logistical hubs, in particular ports and related trans-shipment centres.

Its main customers are the Brazilian freight railway companies América Latina Logística (ALL), MRS Logística, and EFVM and EFC, both subsidiaries of Vale S.A. (the ex-Companhia Vale do Rio Doce Group Vale).

=== Europe ===
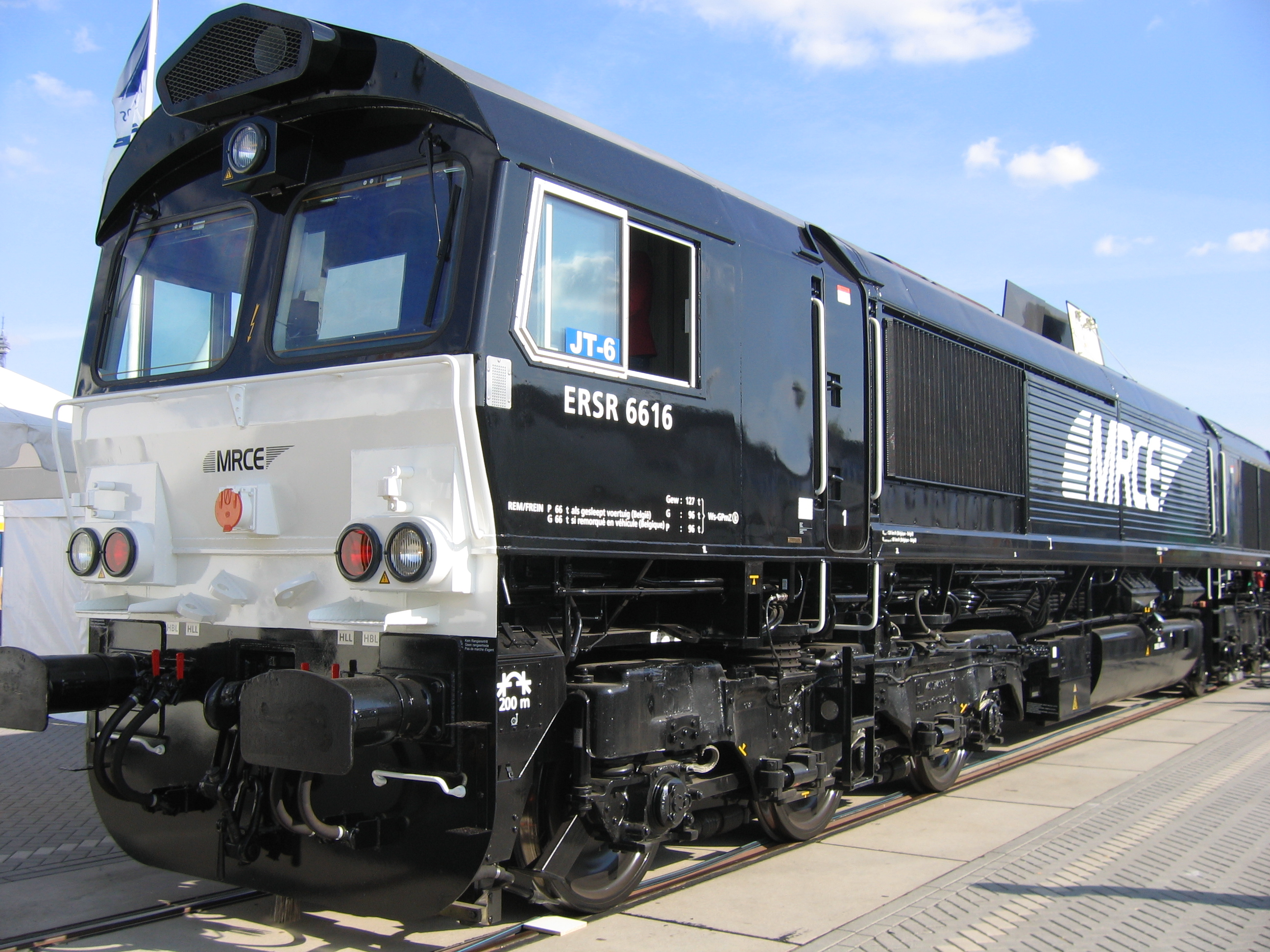
MRCE "Class 66" at Innotrans

Mitsui Rail Capital Europe BV (MRCE) was launched in October 2004 with the headquarters in Amsterdam in the Netherlands as a joint subsidiary of Mitsui & Co., Ltd.(Japan) and Mitsui & Co. Europe plc. (United Kingdom). MRCE's main activity was the leasing of locomotives in Europe for the now liberalised rail transport system - particularly to new private railway companies.

During September 2006, the company expanded its market presence via the acquisition of Siemens Dispolok, based in Munich, Germany. The two companies' operations were subsequently merged; accordingly, dispolok being renamed MRCE dispolok in 2008.

Throughout the 2010s and 2020s, MRCE opted to play an active role in the design and deployment of European Train Control System-compatible apparatus for their locomotive fleet; this activity has involved considerable time and capital outlay, but unlocks greater potential use for the fleet. During 2016, MRCE opened a new office in Milan, Italy. Three years later, the company, in partnership with Siemens Mobility, established a joint venture locomotive workshop in Rotterdam.

By 2023, MRCE leased its locomotives across 18 European countries, including Scandinavia and parts of the Balkans. Locomotives leased from the company typically carry a distinctive black gloss livery.

=== United States ===
Mitsui Rail Capital, LLC (MRC) was established in June 1996 in the U.S. state of Illinois and has business offices in Chicago (Illinois) and Des Moines (Iowa).

During 1997, Unitrain MRC, a specialist in coal transportation, was acquired by the company. A major sector of the firm's operations was the leasing of freight cars, particularly coal wagons. Furthermore, MRC was also involved in the management and maintenance of freight wagon fleets it operates including logistics services.

== Rolling stock ==
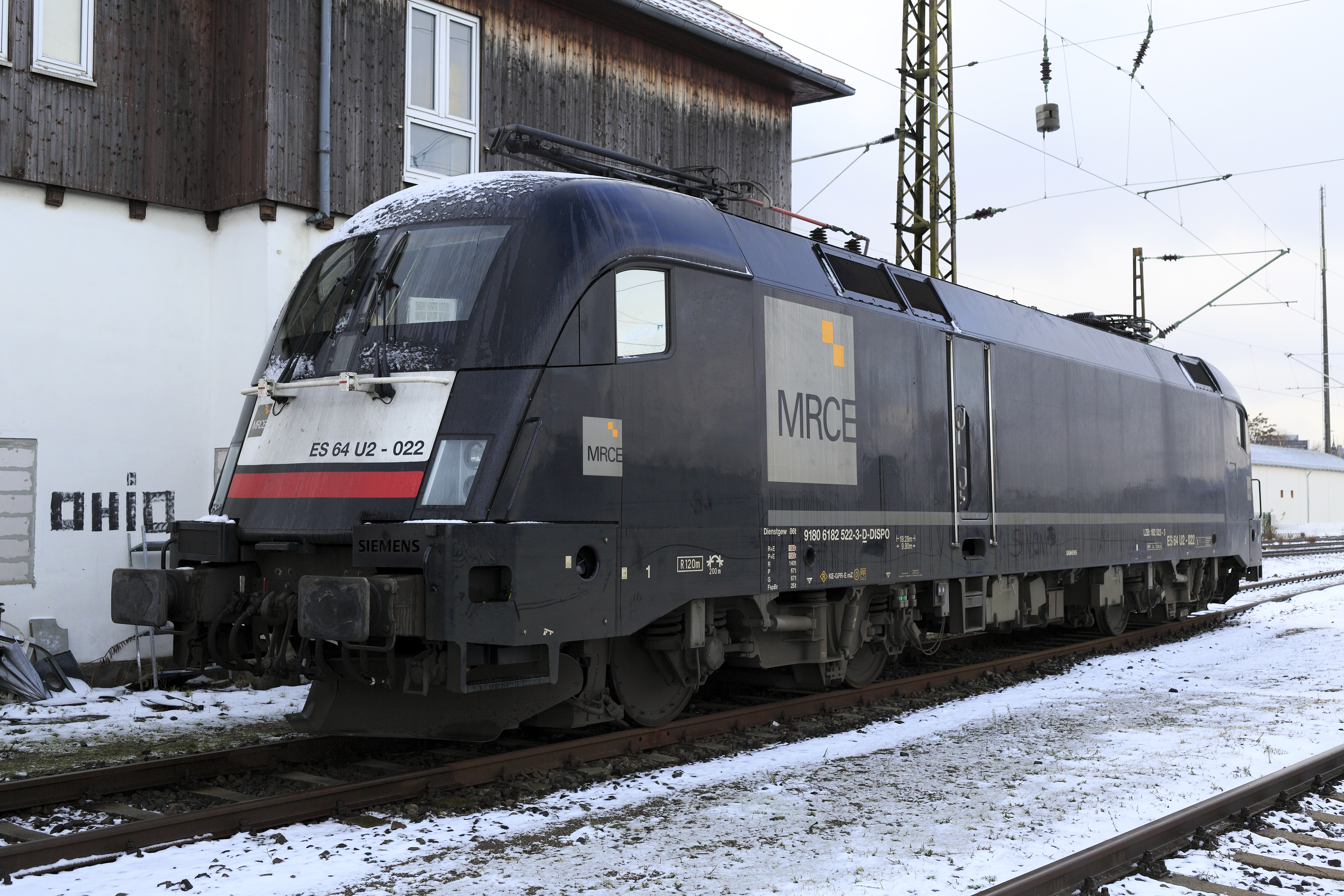
MRCE Taurus

In 2023, the company's inventory consisted of around 340 locomotives supplied by various manufacturers, including Bombardier Transportation, Siemens Mobility and Vossloh Locomotives. Many of these locomotives are fitted with multiple signalling systems, including the European Train Control System, as well as traction apparatus compatible with different power supply systems, so that the company's fleet can be operated across various different countries.

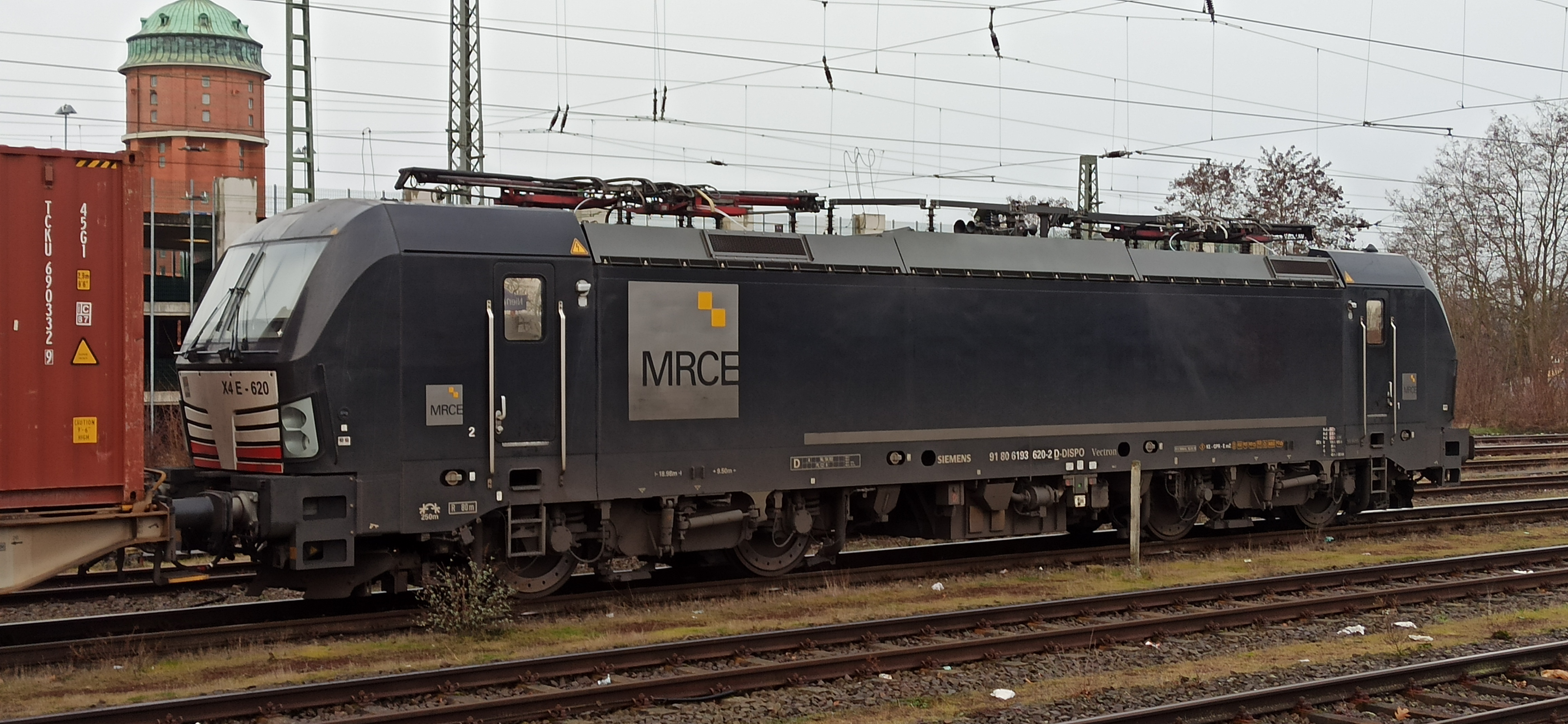
MRCE Vectron

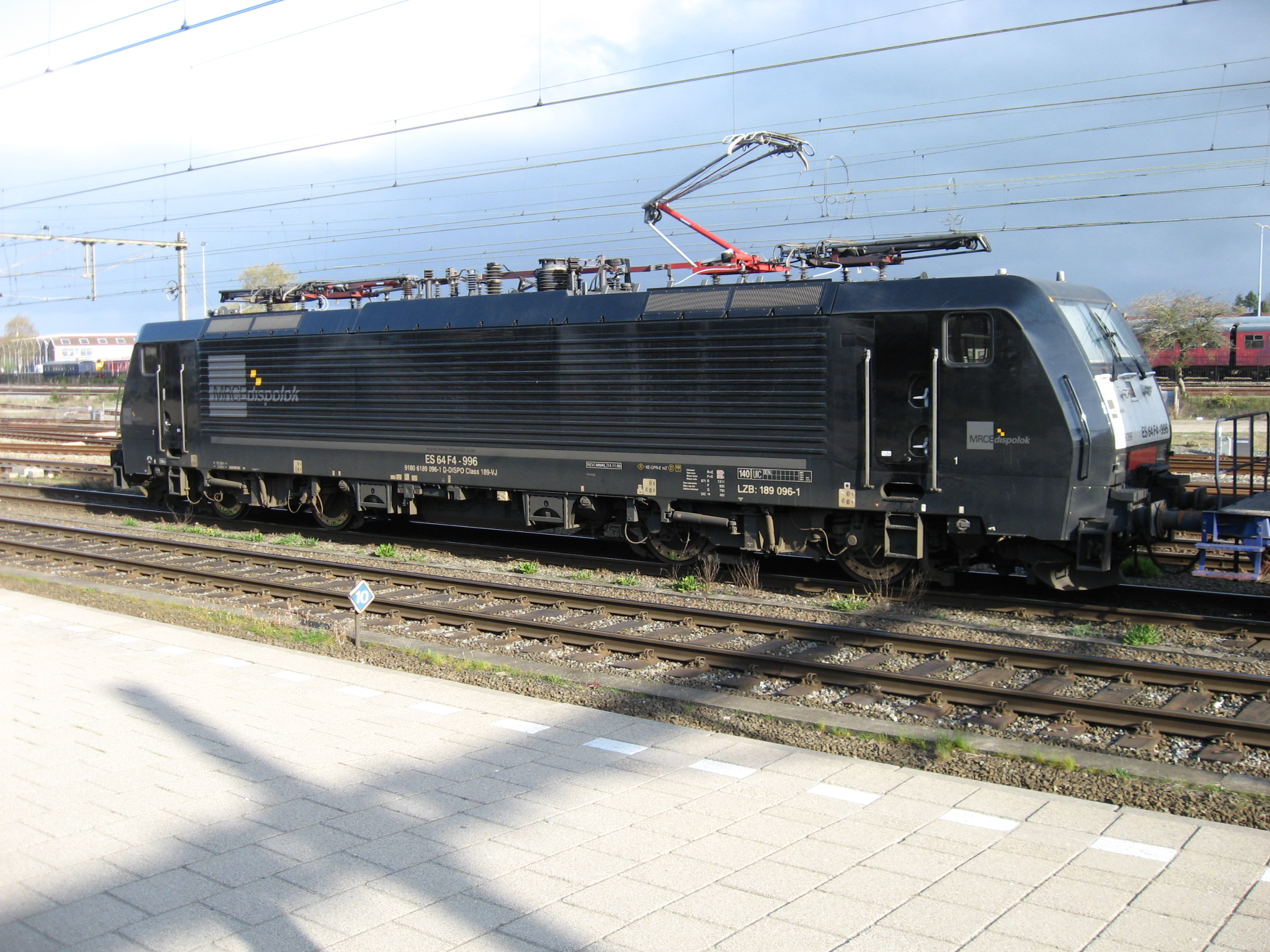
MRCE ES 64 F4

MRCE has developed close working relationships with various rolling stock manufacturers; in the case of Siemens Mobility, they have cooperated in performing fleet data analytics to improve service and maintenance efficiencies. By the end of 2017, across multiple orders, MRCE had arranged to acquire in excess of one hundred Siemens Vectron locomotives.

By 2022, MRC's locomotive inventory included 322 electric locomotives, comprising 29 Bombardier Traxx (BR 145, F140 AC, F140 AC2, F140 MS), 176 Siemens EuroSprinter (ES 64 F4, ES 64 U2), and 127 Siemens Vectron locomotives. It also has various diesel locomotives, including Vossloh G1000 BB, G1206, G1700, G2000, and EMD JT42CWR (also known as "Class 66") locomotives.
