= Cargolink =

Norwegian railway company

Cargolink AS
- Company type: Subsidiary
- Industry: Freight trains
- Founded: 27 March 2008
- Headquarters: Drammen, Norway
- Area served: Norway
- Parent: Autolink
- Website: www.cargolink.no

Cargolink AS is a Norwegian railway company. Owned by the automotive distribution company Autolink, Cargolink has operated both autorack and container trains since November 2008. Cargolink has a fleet of ten diesel locomotives, five shunters, 100 autoracks and 60 container cars. Combined autorack and container trains are operated up to five times per week along the Sørland-, Bergen-, Rauma-, Røros- and Nordland Lines, as well as services through Sweden.

Autolink, the largest distributor of automobiles in Norway, has traditionally bought train services from CargoNet. In 2007, they signed a contract with Ofotbanen, and at the same time bought 40% of the company. However, Ofotbanen was in financial difficulties, causing a dispute between the two owners. The result was that Autolink formally established Cargolink in March 2008, without the knowledge of Ofotbanen, and terminated the contract with Ofotbanen in July. Cargolink received an operating licence in September and service started in November.

== Operation ==
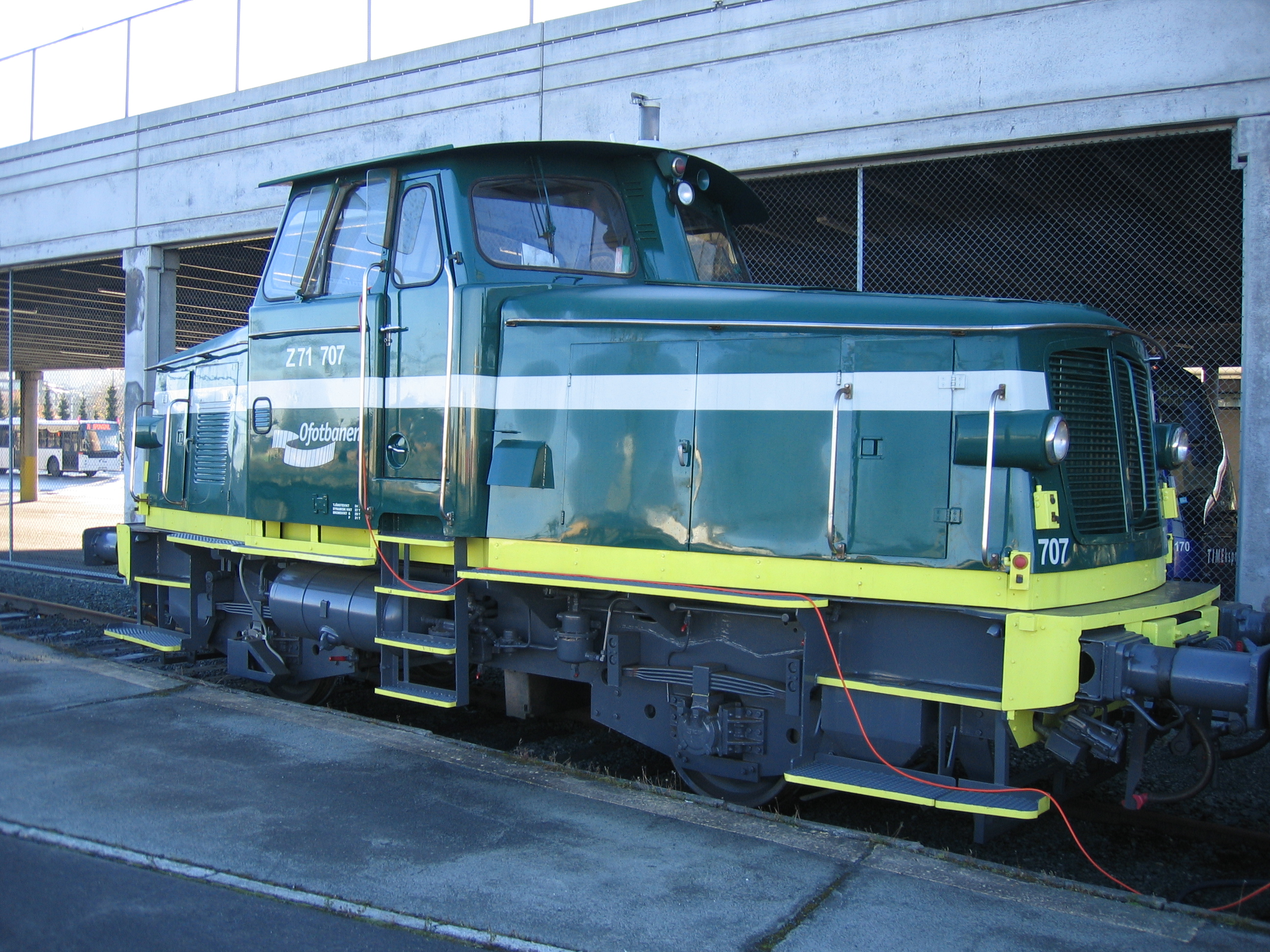
Cargolink has taken over five shunters from Ofotbanen

Cargolink has a fleet of five shunters at their port in Drammen, in addition to three Di 6 diesel locomotives and three TRAXX electric locomotives for main haulage. While the shunters are owned by Cargolink, the diesel locomotives are leased from Dispolok of Germany and the electric locomotives are leased from Hector Rail. It also has more than 100 closed autoracks for automobile transport, and 60 container cars. 70 new autoracks are under delivery from Sweden.

On contract from Autolink, Cargolink operates autorack trains throughout large portions of the Norwegian railway network, from the seaports in Drammen and Oslo. Services are provided along the Sørland Line to Stavanger, along the Bergen Line to Bergen, along the Dovre Line to Trondheim, along the Rauma Line to Åndalsnes, and along the Nordland Line to Mosjøen, Mo i Rana and Bodø. It also operates through Sweden to reach Narvik and Malmö Each route has up to five weekly departures in both directions with combined autorack and container trains. The company transports 55,000 cars annually on 600 trains, giving a revenue of 65 million kr. Autolink is responsible for about three-quarters of all new-car distribution in the country. On the weekly return trips from Northern Norway, Cargolink uses the empty cars to transport aluminum from Elkem Mosjøen.

== History ==
=== Autolink and Ofotbanen ===
Autolink has traditionally owned a large pool of autoracks. These have been operated by the Norwegian State Railways, and subsequently their subsidiary CargoNet. On 31 January 2007, Autolink bought 40% of the private railway company Ofotbanen, and at the same time signed a haulage contract with them. This made Autolink Ofotbanen's largest customer, and second largest owner. In March, Autolink ordered additional 70 new autoracks for NOK 175 million.

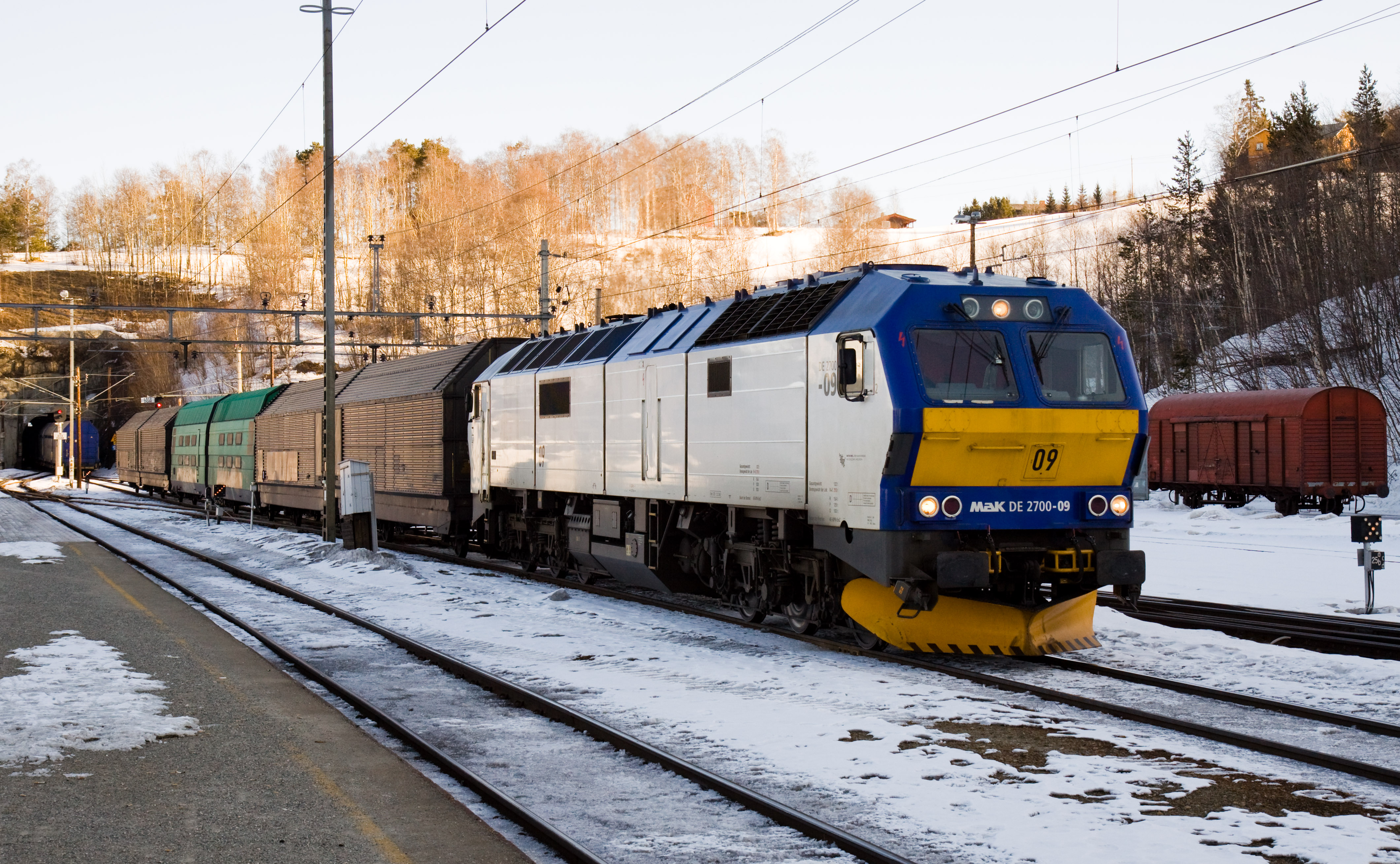
Cargolink Di 6 at Dombås Station on the Dovre Line

Ofotbanen have since their establishment had financial difficulties. The contract with Autolink had helped, but in July 2008, Autolink canceled their contract with Ofotbanen. Two weeks later, Autolink announced that they would establish their own railway company, which they had been working with since March. They stated that the deal with Ofotbanen was discontinued because the majority owner—Rail Management, in turn owned by Mons Bolin—would not allow additional private placements of capital, nor sell their shares to Autolink. From 29 July, all automotive trains stopped running, and no cars were transported for ten days. The same day, all board members in Ofotbanen representing Autolink withdrew from their positions.

The matter ended in court, with a case to determine whether Autolink should be allowed to take control of four train radios that were located in locomotives owned by Autolink, but operated by Ofotbanen. In a shareholder agreement between Autolink and Rail Management, the ownership of the train radios had been transferred to Autolink, but the agreement has clauses that specified that Autolink could not start a competing railway company. Stating that Autolink had been disloyal in regard to the contract, Ofoten District Court ruled on 17 July 2008 against Autolink's demand for an interim order to transfer the ownership of the radios to Autolink. The court ruled that an interim decision could not be made due to the complexity of the contracts, and that a normal lawsuit would have to be carried out to determine the matter. There was agreement that Autolink, on 13 February 2008, had bought five shunters from Ofotbanen for NOK 12 million, of which NOK 9.5 million was paid by Autolink deleting debt.

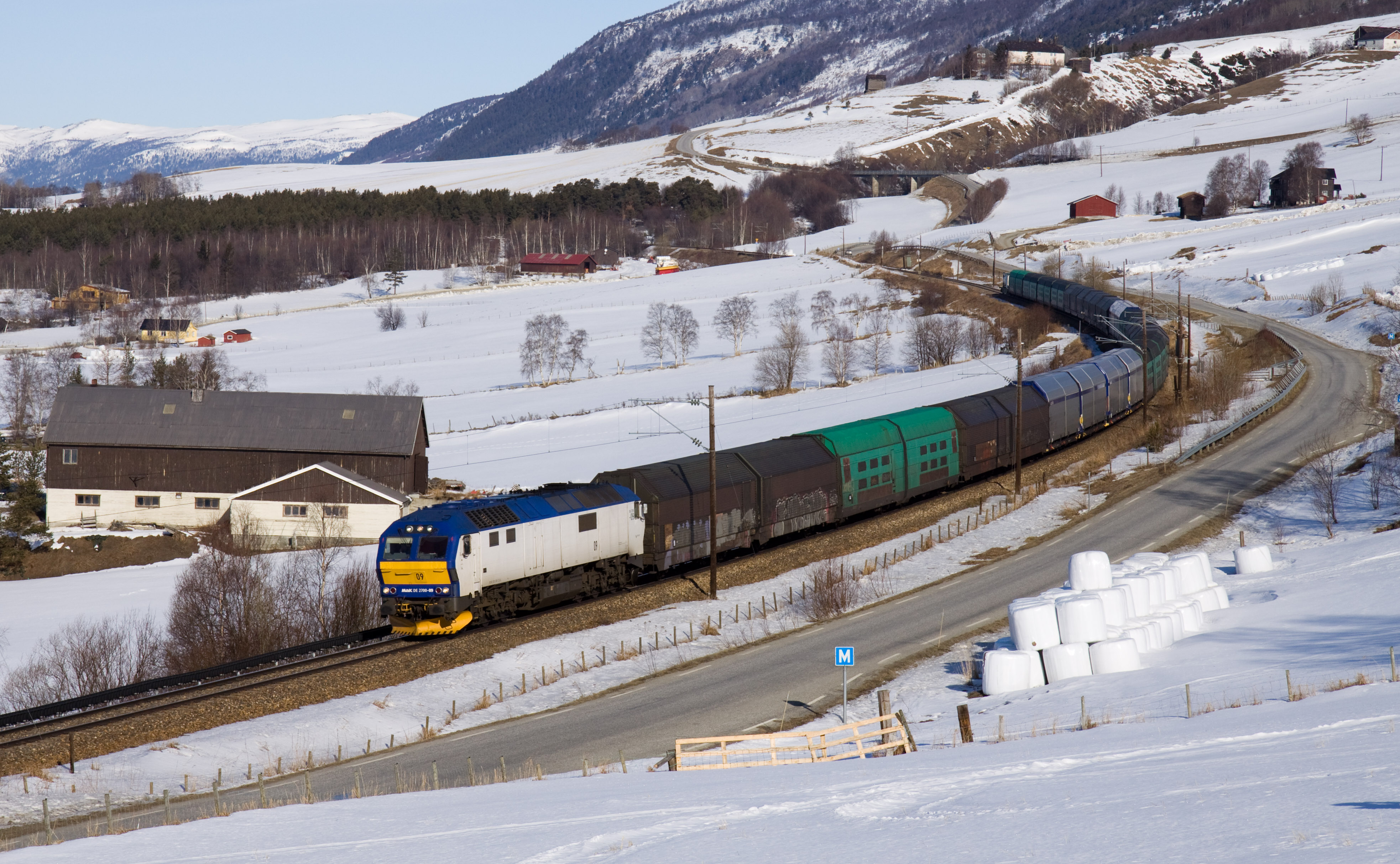
Cargolink autorack train on the Dovre Line

Ofotbanen lost their license from the Norwegian Railway Inspectorate on 7 October 2008. This was because Ofotbanen had not documented necessary accounts for 2007, nor provided evidence of necessary liquidity. On 24 October, the company was declared bankrupt. Rail Management subsequently established the new company Ofotbanen Drift, and stated that the cause of the bankruptcy was that Autolink had not let them make a private placement of NOK 10 million.

=== Establishment ===
Work on establishing the new company was initiated by Autolink in March 2008, with the company formally established on 27 March. It received an operating license from the Norwegian Railway Inspectorate on 18 September 2008. Five shunters that were operated by Ofotbanen, but owned by Autolink, were transferred to Cargolink. In addition, ten Di 6 diesel locomotives have been leased from Vossloh, with options for later purchase. Operations started on 2 November, with 22 engineers based in Drammen. Since the company has an all-diesel fleet, management is working to reroute trains to Trondheim and Northern Norway along the Røros Line instead of the Dovre Line. CargoNet and Ofotbanen had been using the Dovre Line because it is electrified, giving lower operating costs despite its elevation, 350 m (1,150 ft) higher than the Røros Line. After initial trial runs with only three locomotives, full service was introduced later in November.
