= DB Class 240 =

Class of German diesel-electric locomotives

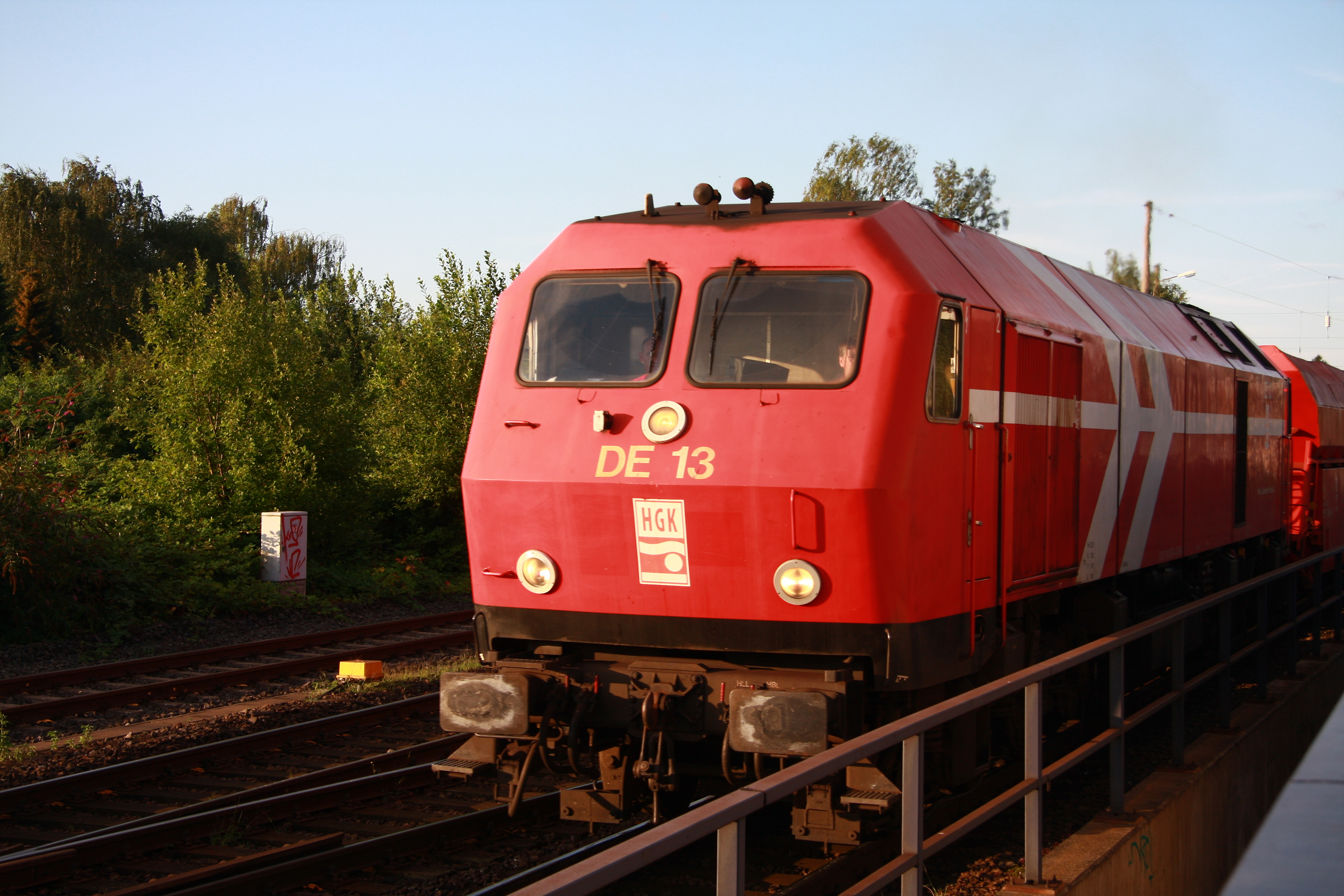
- The last operational DB Class 240, now owned by and in the livery of the Häfen und Güterverkehr Köln
Type and origin
- Power type: Diesel-electric
- Builder: MaK, Krupp, and ABB
- Model: DE 1024
- Build date: 1989
- Total produced: 3
Specifications
- Configuration
  - UIC: Co′Co′
- Gauge: 1,435 mm (4 ft 8 1/2 in)
- Length: 20.960 m (68 ft 9 in)
- Width: 4.175 m (13 ft 8 in)
- Height: 2.910 m (9 ft 7 in)
- Loco weight: 117 t (115 long tons; 129 short tons)
- Fuel type: Diesel fuel
- Fuel capacity: 5,000 L (1,100 imp gal; 1,300 US gal)
- Prime mover: MaK 12M282
- Alternator: WB630K8
- Traction motors: 6FRA3368, (6 of)
- Train heating: Electric
- Loco brake: Air
- Train brakes: Air
Performance figures
- Maximum speed: 160 km/h (99 mph)
- Power output: 2,650 kW (3,550 hp)
- Tractive effort: Starting: 405 kN (91,000 lbf)
Career
- Operators: Deutsche Bundesbahn, Häfen und Güterverkehr Köln
- Numbers: DB 240 001 to DB 240 003, HGK EN 11 to 13
- Disposition: 240 003: in service; 240 002: fire damaged, later rebuilt as electro-diesel Voith Futura; 240 001: retired and retained for spares

The DB Class 240 are a class of Co′Co′ diesel-electric locomotives which were produced in the 1980s by MaK in collaboration with Krupp and ABB as DE 1024 as prototypes/technology demonstrators for a possible future order from the Deutsche Bundesbahn.

Three units were made, but no orders arose, at least in part due to the Reunification of Germany making similarly specified DR Class 132s available in large numbers.

== History and background ==
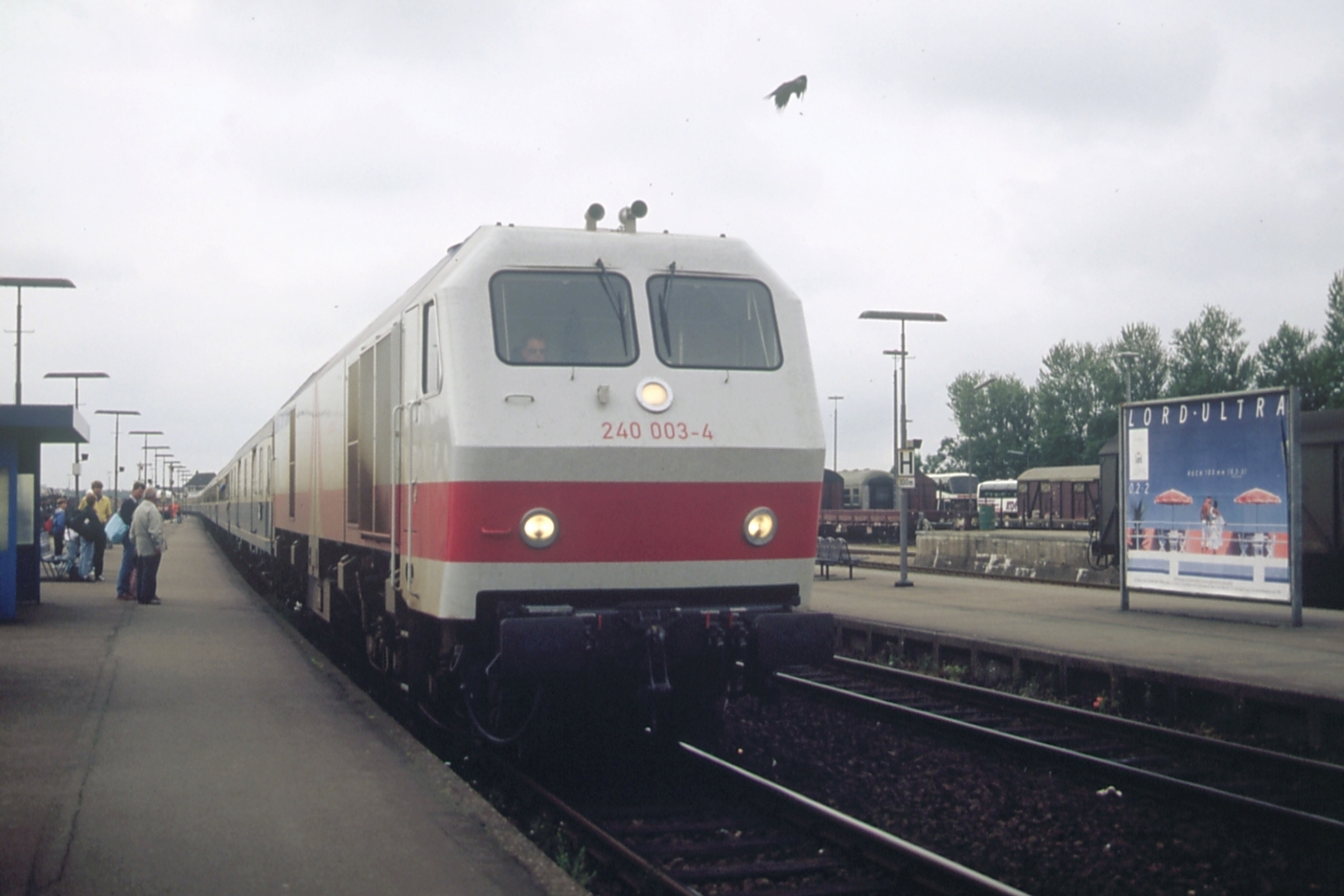
DB 240 003-4 at Niebüll station in 1990

In the late 1980s, at its own expense, MaK built three new prototypes designated as the DE 1024. They were designed as a universal high powered locomotive, capable of hauling both freight and passenger trains, for use on the non-electrified parts of the German rail network - which at that time included much of northern Germany. In October 1989 the machines were ready for use, and extensive testing took place, with the units being passed to DB for assessment. No orders from the Deutsche Bundesbahn came as a result of this - instead electrification of parts of the northern German rail network took place, the reunification of Germany put a nail in the coffin of the possibility of any orders from the home country; as large numbers of similar DR Class 132 locomotives became available.

In keeping with their northern German birth and operations the locomotives were named "Kiel", "Westerland" and "Lübeck" respectively.

== Design ==
Assembled at Kiel by MaK (and at the time the largest single engined diesel in Germany), the locomotives used an electrical power transmission system supplied by ABB with microprocessor control and GTO power electronics. In common with other MaK locomotives of that time (e.g. MaK G1206) the internal design was based around the idea of modular construction, with individual parts (engine, traction electronics etc.) being easily replaceable, and interchangeable with alternative units.

The engine was a twelve-cylinder MaK 12M282, with a power of ~2.5 MW at 1000 rpm which drove an alternator (type WB630K8) producing 3 phase AC at a maximum voltage of 2800 V. This electrical supply is then rectified to provide DC power to switching electronics controlled by a microprocessor, which in turn provide the electrical power supply for three phase asynchronous traction motors (of type 6FRA3368). Additional electrical supply of up to 700 kW could be provided for electrical train heating etc.

== Operations ==
After testing and the trial runs with DB the locomotives returned to MaK.

The three units were leased via Traffic Krupp GmbH whilst MaK was under Krupp ownership, being on hire to DBAG in the early 1990s. In 1994 MaK changed hands - becoming part of Siemens as Siemens Schienenfahrzeugtechnik, the locomotives were withdrawn from DB service in 1996, and were subsequently leased to Häfen und Güterverkehr Köln (HGK) and given the numbers EN 11, 12 and 13.

The first unit suffered a fire in one of the bogies in 2008, writing the locomotive off.

The second unit was damaged by an unexplained cab fire in 2005. It was however repaired between July 2009 and September 2010 by Voith Turbo, which rebuilt the locomotive as a dual power source electro-diesel locomotive. This locomotive will serve as a proof of concept for the CREAM-project, funded by the European Commission. The concept locomotive was baptised Voith Futura.

== Conclusions ==
The concept and design of these locomotives served as the basis for the NSB Di6 class, which have received negative headlines due to their rejection and return from the Norwegian railways. The locomotives can be considered forerunners of the modern diesel electric locomotives of the 2000s such as the Eurorunner, both for the inclusion of an electronically controlled power system, and the modular design plan.

Since only one locomotive remains in service, with no further machines expected the final example has an element of cult status amongst some diesel-electric train fans.

== References and notes ==
=== Sources ===
- DE 1024 loks-aus-kiel.de : Fleet history, technical specifications.
- Dieselelektrische Hochleistungslokomotive Baureihe 240 leo.org : Technical details and testing information
- BR 240 MaK-Diesselok DE 1024 bahntantchen.de : History, naming, and photo gallery.
- HGK Loks, MaK DE 1024, railrunner.de : History, technical, numbering, and schematic technical drawings.
