= NSB Di 6 =

Norwegian State Railways' class of twelve diesel-electric locomotives

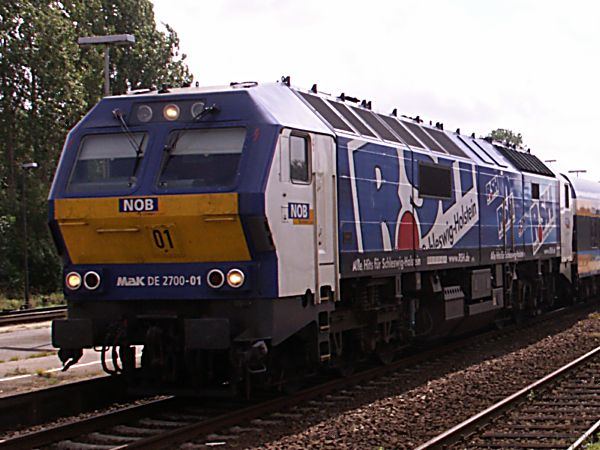
- Di 6 in service with Nord-Ostsee-Bahn of Germany
Type and origin
- Power type: Diesel-electric
- Builder: Siemens Schienenfahrzeugtechnik at Maschinenbau Kiel
- Build date: 1997
- Total produced: 12
Specifications
- Configuration
  - UIC: Co′Co′
- Gauge: 1,435 mm (4 ft 8 1/2 in) standard gauge
- Wheel diameter: 1,060 mm (41.73 in)
- Minimum curve: 100 m (328 ft)
- Wheelbase: 3.94 m (12 ft 11 1/8 in) (bogie outer axle distance); 11.75 m (38 ft 7 in) (bogie center distance)
- Length: 20.96 m (68 ft 9 1/4 in)
- Width: 3.00 m (9 ft 10 1/8 in)
- Height: 4.39 m (14 ft 4 7/8 in)
- Axle load: 20.6 t (20.3 long tons; 22.7 short tons)
- Loco weight: 122 t (120 long tons; 134 short tons)
- Fuel capacity: 5,000 L (1,100 imp gal; 1,300 US gal)
- Prime mover: MaK 12M282
- Engine type: V12
- Generator: VEM DREBZ 5620-8
- Cylinders: 12
- Transmission: Electric
Performance figures
- Maximum speed: 160 km/h (99 mph)
- Power output: 2,650 kW (3,550 hp) @ 1000 RPM
- Tractive effort: 400 kN (90,000 lb_{f})
Career
- Operators: Norwegian State Railways
- Number in class: 12
- Numbers: 6.661 – 6.672
- Current owner: Vossloh
- Disposition: Returned to Siemens (Dispolok) and sold to Vossloh
- Sources: except where noted

NSB Di 6, later designated ME 26 and DE 2700, is a class of twelve diesel-electric locomotives built by Siemens for the Norwegian State Railways (NSB). The prime mover provides a power output of 2,650 kilowatts (3,550 hp), a starting traction effort of 400 kilonewtons (90,000 lb_{f}) and a maximum speed of 160 kilometres per hour (99 mph). They have a Co′Co′ wheel arrangement. The bidirectional locomotives were designed for use with both passenger and freight trains.

The units were ordered by NSB in 1992 as replacements for the aging Di 3, and were particularly intended for use on the Nordland Line and to a lesser extent on the Røros Line. Construction was done by Maschinenbau Kiel (MaK) in Kiel, Germany, which was then part of Siemens Schienenfahrzeugtechnik. The class is largely based on the MaK-built DB Class 240, with each unit costing 32 million Norwegian krone (NOK). The first units were delivered in March 1996, one year after schedule, but were plagued with faults. By 1999, the entire order was terminated and the locomotives returned to Germany. They were taken over by locomotive lessor Dispolok and were used by various Germany railway companies. Ownership was taken over by Vossloh in 2003, after which most of the class were leased to German passenger train operator Nord-Ostsee-Bahn. In 2008, three units returned to Norway and are used by Cargolink for freight trains.

== History ==
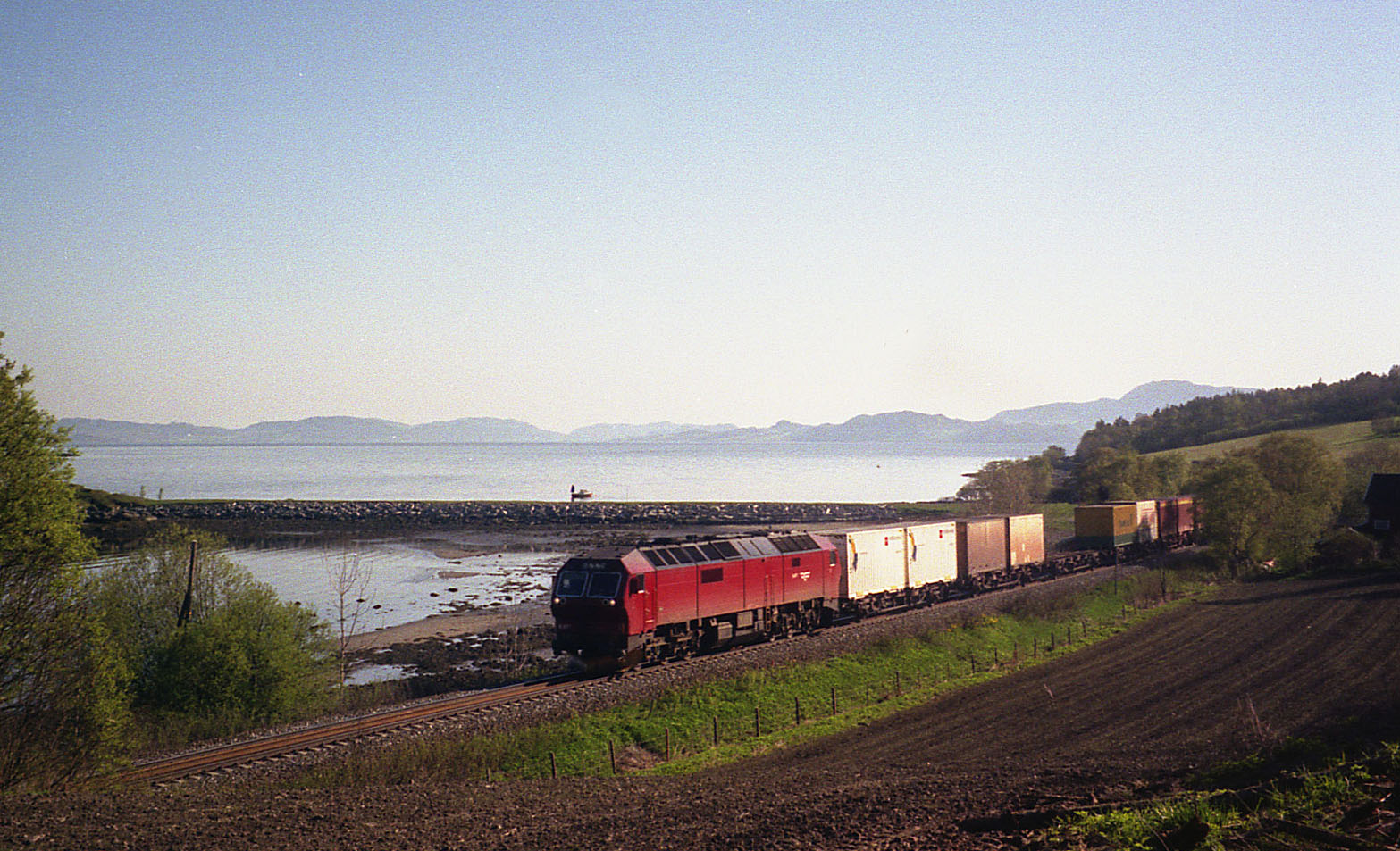
NSB Di 6 hauling a freight train near Trondheim on the Nordland Line in 1998

During the late 1980s, the Norwegian State Railways sought a new locomotive type to replace its aging fleet of Di 3 diesel-electric locomotives, which made up the back-bone of the dieselized operations. The new locomotives were planned for use as freight and passenger trains on the Nordland Line, and to a lesser extent on the Røros Line. In 1980, NSB had taken delivery of five Di 4 from Henschel. Originally there were plans to order additional Di 4 units, but this was discarded and instead a new class was pursued, as NSB wanted similar, but slightly more modern, locomotives.

A MaK-built DB Class 240 locomotive was test-run in Norway during 1990. On 23 November 1992, NSB's board decided to order ten similar units. The order was later expanded with another two units because NSB was offered a lower price than originally stipulated. The Di 6 would have motors from Siemens, who had bought MaK, and would be optimized for Norwegian conditions and standards. The contract was worth NOK 380 million, or NOK 32 million per unit. At the same time, NSB also made an order for 20 smaller diesel-electric locomotives from MaK, the Di 8. Between the two new classes, they were to replace all the Di 3s.

The contract for the Di 6 called for the first delivery in February 1995. Several components were to be manufactured by NSB, including the fuel tanks, sandboxes, engine frames, alternators and some components for the bogies. The first locomotive was delivered on 7 March 1996, but quickly proved to not meet the specifications in the contract. In particular, the locomotives had too high fuel consumption and the bogies had faults, as they had too high track forces. Both of these issues were difficult to solve. The Di 6 also had problems with overheating, in particular in the main alternators, the oil cooler and the brakes. The on-board computer failed when the outdoor temperature fell too low.

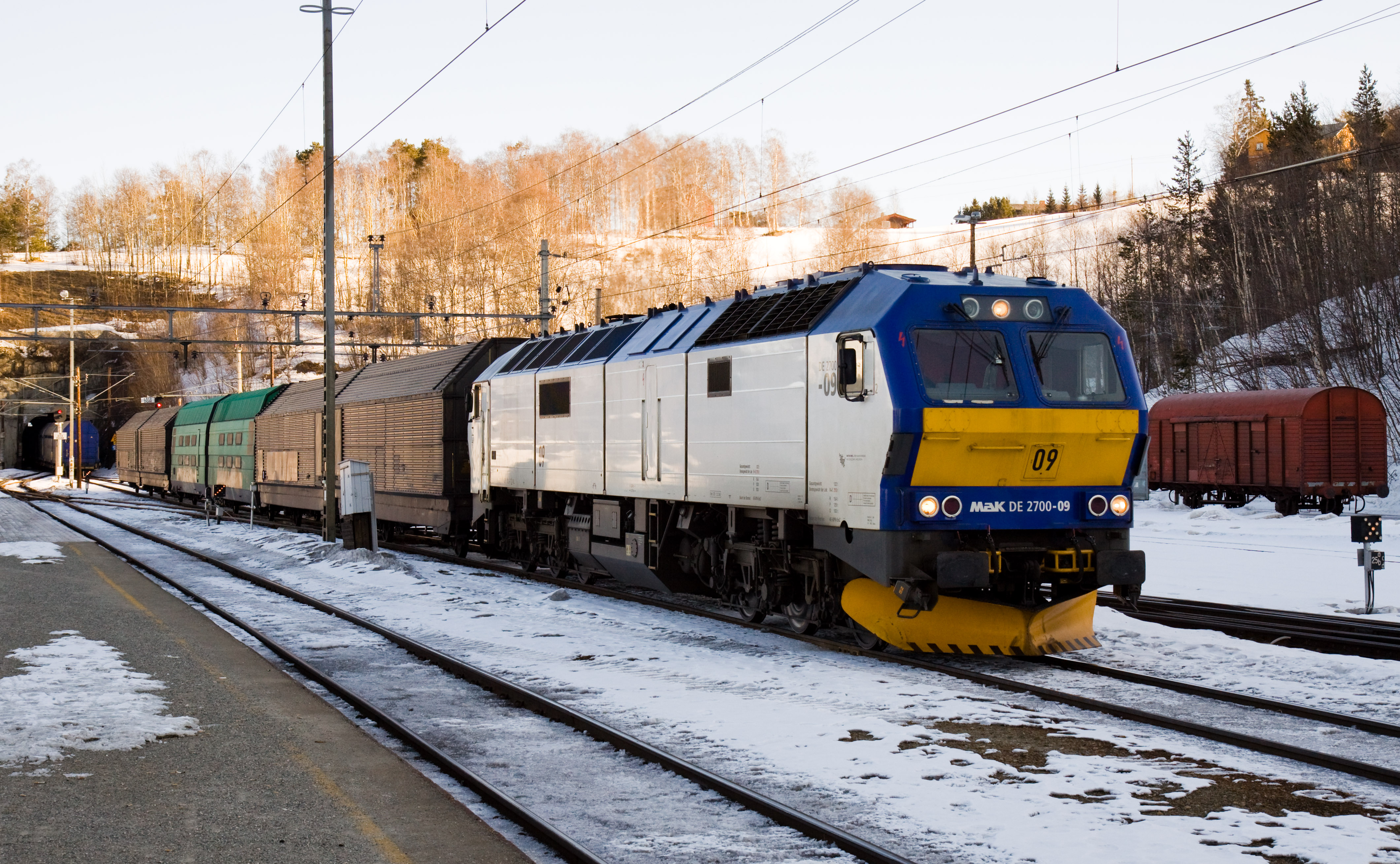
Cargolink Di 6 at Dombås Station on Norway's Dovre Line

On 23 September 1996, NSB's administration recommended that the purchase be terminated. However, this was put on hold by the board. Instead, a renegotiated contract was signed, whereby Siemens was obliged to deliver the locomotives, as specified, by mid-1997. If not, the two parties agreed that the contract would be terminated. By late 1996, five locomotives had been delivered, and these were returned to Kiel for upgrades. The first returned to Norway on 30 November 1996, after the ventilator motors had been upgraded, new oil coolers installed and other minor upgrades had been performed. From January 1997, they were put into regular use with freight trains on the Nordland Line. In mid-1997, number 664 was damaged in a fire caused by an incorrectly mounted exhaust system. In October 1997, cracks were found in the wheels, and all units were taken out of service while they were being fixed.

On 17 December 1997, NSB's board decided to purchase eleven of the locomotives, excluding number 664. This was based on an agreement whereby NSB would receive compensation for the incurred losses owing to late delivery and under-performance. Siemens guaranteed that ten of eleven locomotives would be operational at any time. All units were again grounded in January 1998, following two fires. Siemens had between 15 and 20 employees stationed in Trondheim to fix the issues. Regularity on the Nordland Line plummeted from 67 to 46 percent with the introduction of Di 6. NSB was forced to keep 15 Di 3s, which were up to 42 years old, in operational condition to keep services running. The extra costs of keeping the Di 3s running were about NOK 50 million per year. These costs would continue until NSB could take delivery of new locomotives, which could take up to three years from the time of order. One contributing factor was a 25 percent extra wage for engineers for having above-regulation noise levels in the Di 3 cabs. Two Di 3s were often run along with a Di 6 in a train as backup; should the Di 6 fail, the Di 3 would continue hauling the train.

On 28 April 1998, NSB officially announced to Siemens that they might terminate the purchase contract, describing the locomotives as having "fundamental construction faults" By July 1998, nine of the eleven units were out of service and one was returned to Germany for repairs after a fire. When the only operational unit broke down, NSB's board sent a bill for the purchase price plus interest to Siemens, stating that if it was not paid within a week, the issue would be brought to court.

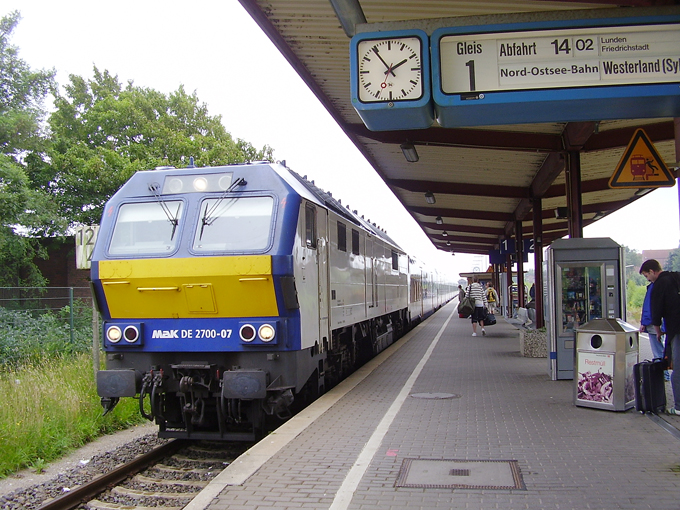
Nord-Ostsee-Bahn locomotive at Heide, Germany

Siemens stated that they would not be able to have the locomotives operational until mid-1999. By February 1999, Siemens had given up trying to fix the locomotives, although they had established that the main fault lay in the generators. The issue never reached the courts. On 5 May 1999, the companies announcement that they had reached an agreement for the trains to be returned to Siemens, and NOK 485 million be compensated to NSB. This was in addition to NOK 80 million which had already been given as discount. In addition to the purchase price, the compensation included interest and coverage for NSB's extra expenses. The locomotives were immediately dismounted of NSB-owned equipment and on 20 May sent by ship to Hamburg.

A major contributor to the faults lay in Siemen's 1992 take-over of MaK, in which a large number of veteran employees, who had the necessary competence to build diesel-locomotives, were retired. In 1998, Siemens sold the Kiel facilities to Vossloh. Following the return to Germany, the locomotives were modified to meet German standards and designed ME 26. They were made narrower by removing outside stairs and railings, and moving lights to meet International Union of Railways standards. There were also changes to the cab walls, with internal railings added and the toilets removed. The speed was also reduced to 140 km/h (87 mph), although this has later been reverted. Number 664 was rebuilt in Kiel, but because of the lack of capacity at MaK, the remaining units were rebuilt by DSB in Copenhagen. After the upgrades, ownership was transferred to Dispolok, a leasing pool originally owned by Siemens.

The first two units were leased to Denmark's Privatbanen Sønderjylland. Later lessees of one or more units included Cargolink, Chemins de Fer Luxembourgeois (CFL), CTL Logistics, Hoyer Railserv, HSL-Logistik, KEP Logistik, NetLog Netzwerklogistik, Neuss-Düsseldorfer Häfen, Norddeutsche Eisenbahngesellschaft, Osthavelländische Eisenbahn, the Port of Kiel, RSE Cargo, Regental Bahnbetriebs, Schneider & Schneider and Verkehrsbetriebe Peine-Salzgitter.

Six units were leased by CFL between 2000 and 2004. (Note: ex-Di6 numbers 662, 663, 664, 665, 668, 669, 672; see history sources) The Luxembourgian State Railways were in need of new diesel locomotives to overcome the three different electrification systems in use. Because of a three-year waiting time for new locomotives, CFL leased the Di 6 units for freight trains between Esch-sur-Alzette, Bettembourg and Mertert. In November 2003, the locomotives were sold to Vossloh and given the designation DE 2700. Since 2006, the main leaser is the Veolia Verkehr-owned Nord-Ostsee-Bahn, which operates passenger trains in Schleswig-Holstein, Germany. Eight locomotives are used to haul six to ten-car passengers trains on the route between Hamburg and Sylt. In 2008, three locomotives returned to Norway, when Cargolink leased them for their new autorack freight operations. In 2009, NOB transferred its ninth unit to HSL Logistik.

== Specifications ==
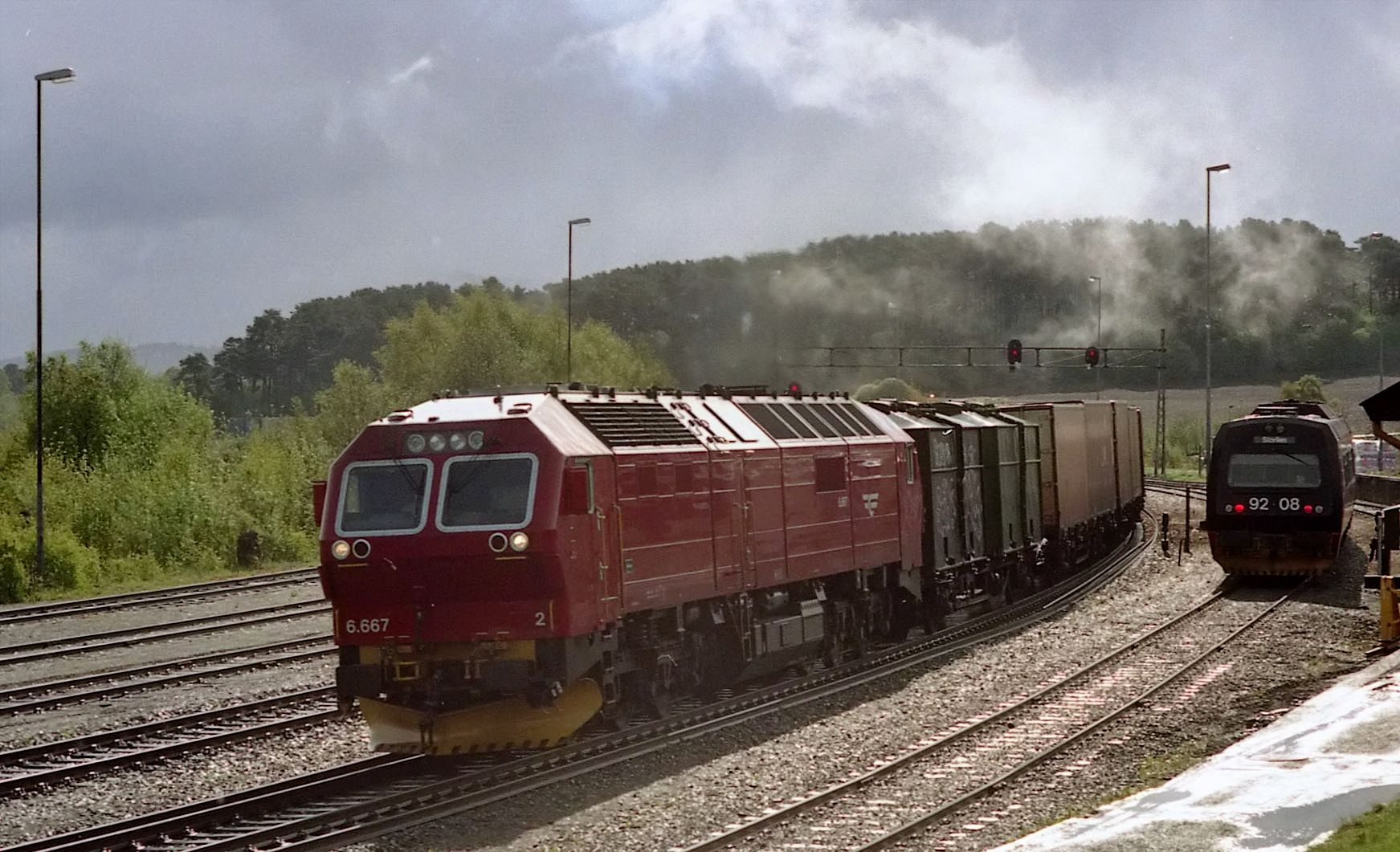
A NSB Di 6 locomotive hauling a freight train at Leangen Station on the Nordland Line in 1998

The diesel-electric locomotive has a MaK 12-cylinder 12M282 diesel prime mover which provides a power output of 2,650 kilowatts (3,550 hp) at 1000 revolutions per minute. Transmission of power is by Siemens-built bogie-mounted three phase asynchronous induction type double pole pair traction motors which power the wheels via reduction gear and a hollow quill drive connected to the wheels at both ends via resilient links. The six traction motors are supplied with three-phase electrical power by gate turn-off thyristor controlled inverters using pulse-width modulation controlled by a Siemens' Sibas-32 traction control electronics. The electronic inverters are cooled by evaporated fluid, the traction motors are air cooled by external fans.

The units have a starting traction effort of 400 kilonewtons (90,000 lb_{f}) and a continuous traction effort of 283 kilonewtons (64,000 lb_{f}). Maximum operating speed is 160 kilometers per hour (99 mph). The locomotives each have two bogies, each with three powered standard gauge axles, giving a Co′Co′ wheel arrangement. The bogies are equipped with two-stage suspension. The bogies have a wheelbase between the outer wheels of 3.940 meters (12.93 ft) and a distance between the bogie centers of 11.750 meters (38.55 ft). The wheels have a diameter of 1,060 millimeters (41.73 in) when new. The locomotive has a minimum curve radius of 100 meters (328 ft).

The bidirectional locomotives are 20.960 meters (68 ft 9.2 in) long, 3.000 meters (9 ft 10.1 in) wide, 4.385 meters (14 ft 4.6 in) tall and weigh 122 tonnes (120 long tons; 134 short tons). The fuel capacity is 5,000 liters (1,100 imp gal; 1,300 U.S. gal). The units were originally equipped with a galley and toilet for the engineer. The locomotive has head end power, allowing it to haul passenger trains in addition to freight trains. NSB's Di 3, Di 4, Di 6 and Di 8 can all be run with together with up to three locomotives in multiple.
