= Nord-Ostsee-Bahn =

German transport company

Nord-Ostsee-Bahn GmbH
- Company type: GmbH
- Founded: 2000
- Headquarters: Kiel, Germany
- Area served: Germany
- Services: Passenger transportation
- Parent: Transdev
- Website: www.nob.de

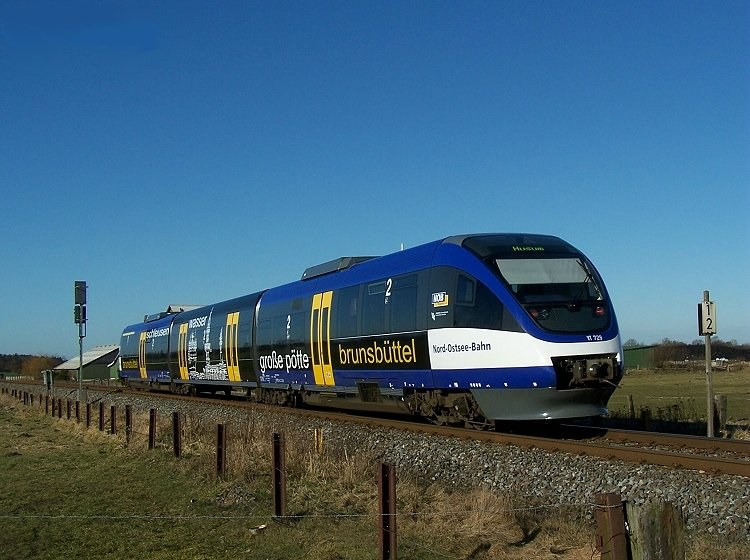
Bombardier Talent

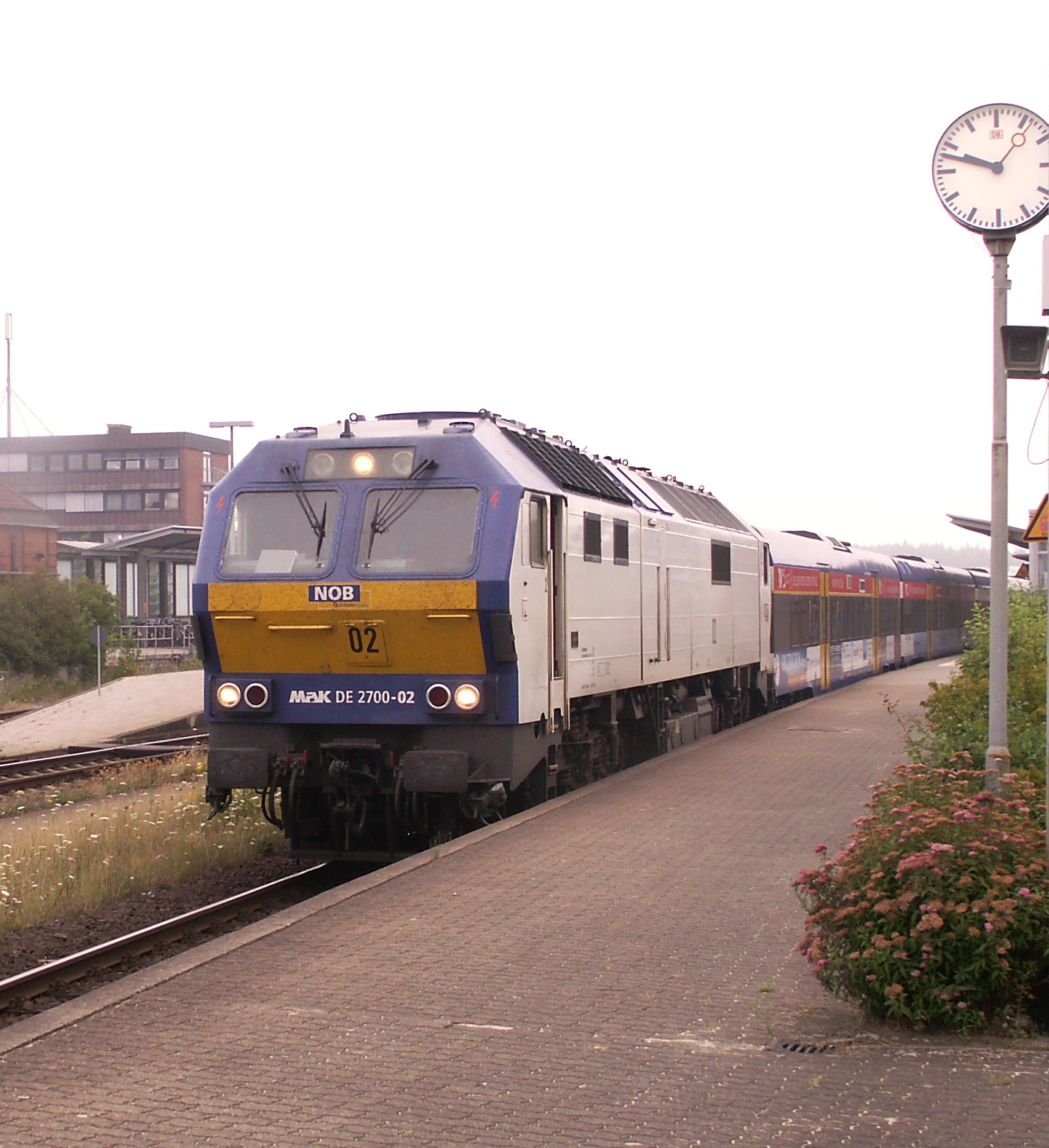
DE 2700

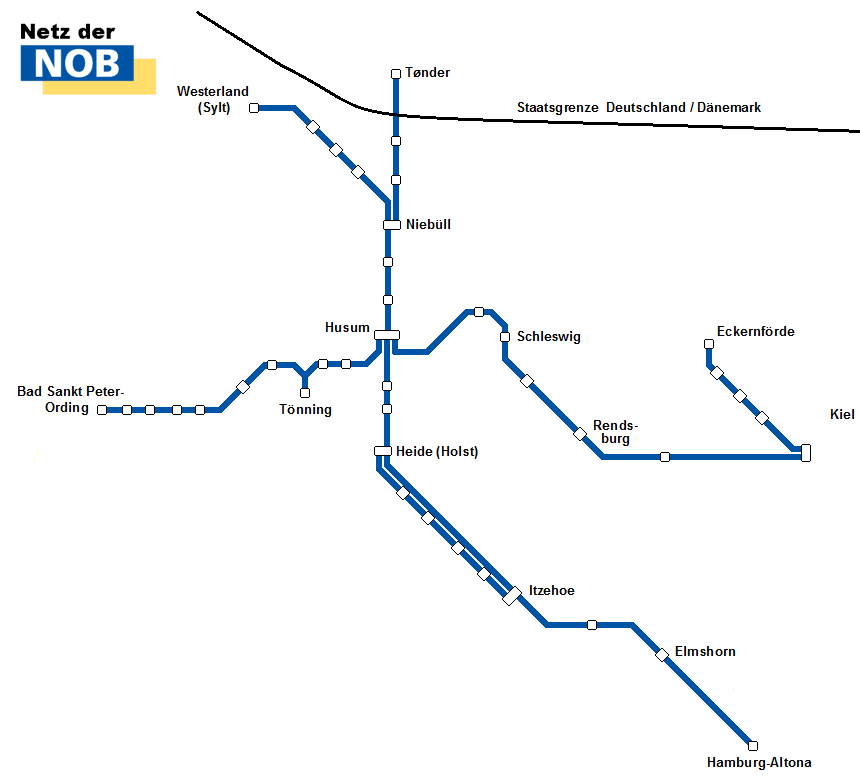
Network schematic

Nord-Ostsee-Bahn ("North Sea–Baltic Railway") or NOB is a transport company which operates buses in Schleswig-Holstein, Germany. Based in Kiel, the company was established in 2000 and is owned by Transdev. The company formerly operated the Marsh Railway between Hamburg and Westerland.

== Fleet ==
NOB operated two classes of diesel-electric locomotives, both on the section between Hamburg and Sylt: the Di 6 (DE 2700) and the Eurorunner (DE 2000). It used two classes of diesel multiple units: the Alstom Coradia LINT and the Bombardier Talent.
