= Dispolok =

MRCE Dispolok Logo

Dispolok was a locomotive leasing company founded by Siemens in 2001 offering locomotives for hire to European rail operators. In September 2006 it was bought by Mitsui Rail Capital Europe with the brand retired in January 2008.

== History ==
Due to technical problems with different locomotives, including the diesel electric Locomotive ME26 (see NSB Di 6) Siemens found itself with locomotives that had been returned from the original purchaser.

In order to avoid a total loss, and with the deregulation of rail transport in Europe taking place it was decided to offer these locomotives to private companies on a leased basis.

Since the new privately owned rail companies were almost all entirely new companies with no experience or infrastructure to deal with locomotive maintenance the leasing agreements included full servicing to be provided by Siemens (or its associates). In addition Siemens offer the leasers an option to buy the locomotives later if they so wished.

Since the concept of operation of the new company put it in competition with the main customers of Siemens Transportation Systems, Displok was created as an independent company with limited liability (see Gesellschaft mit beschränkter Haftung) in order to avoid possible legal conflicts.

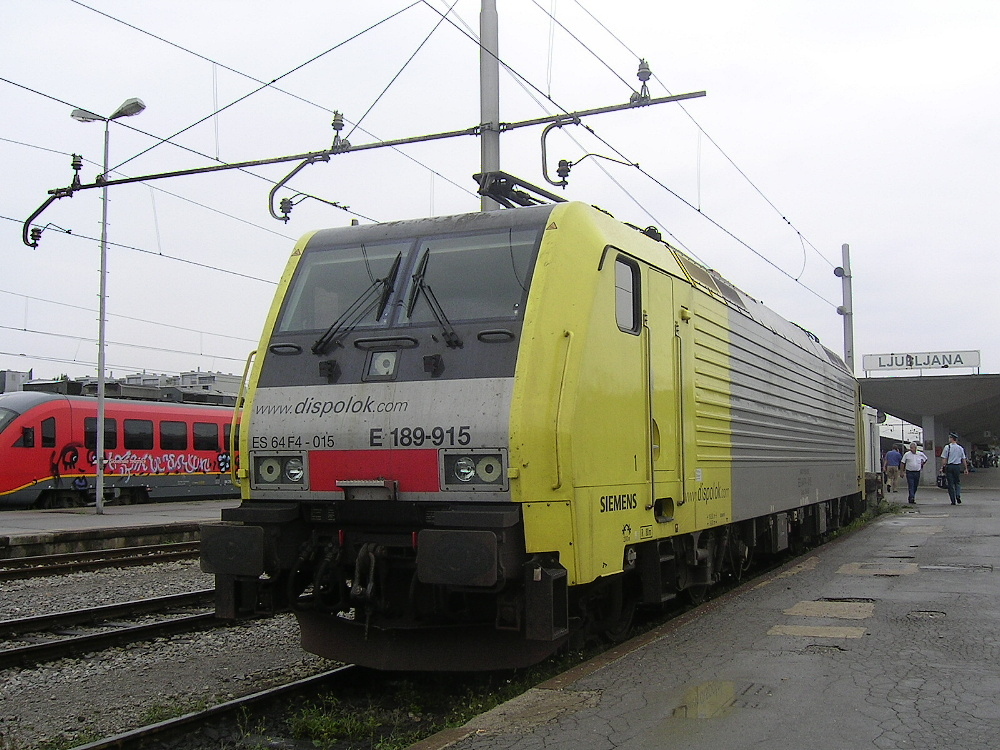
Siemens locomotive of type ES 64 F4 in yellow and silvery Dispolok livery

=== Mitsui acquisition and incorporation ===
Mitsui Rail Capital Europe (MRCE) purchased Dispolok in 2006, with the acquisition Mitsui committed itself to the purchase of 50 Siemens electric locomotives of the EuroSprinter type.

In January 2008, the company was renamed MRCE Dispolok. The integration was completed on 1 April 2008 with all the shares of the subsidiary acquired; with the takeover the livery of the Dispolok locomotives has changed from the yellow and silver of Siemens to black under Mitsui, with the new name "MRCE Dispolok" on the sides of the locomotives. In order to create more unity, the shareholders have made the decision on 7 March 2013, to rename the company to MRCE GmbH.

== Fleet ==
- ES64 P (ES64 EuroSprinter prototype; DBAG Series 127)
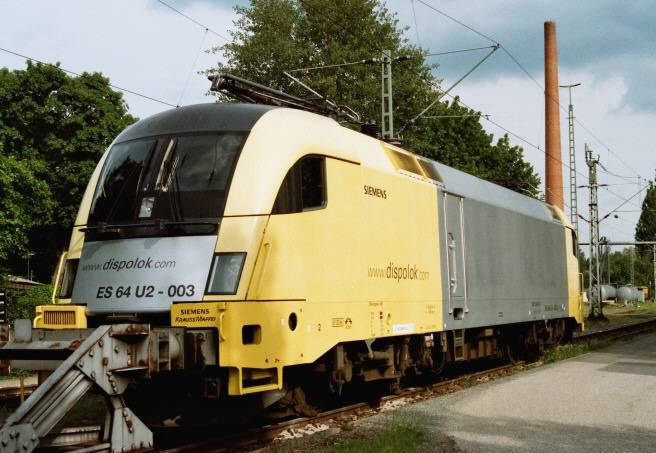
  Dispolok Taurus
- ES64 U2, (identical to DB Class 182, ÖBB 1016, 1116 (Taurus), MAV 1047)
- ES64 F4, (identical to DB Class 189, SBB Re 474)
- ER20 Euro Runner, (identical to ÖBB 2016)
- Former vehicles:
- ES64 F: sold to ITL in 2005 (identical to DB Class 152)
- ME26, sold in 2004, to Vossloh
