= EuroSprinter =

Family of electric locomotives

Eurosprinter
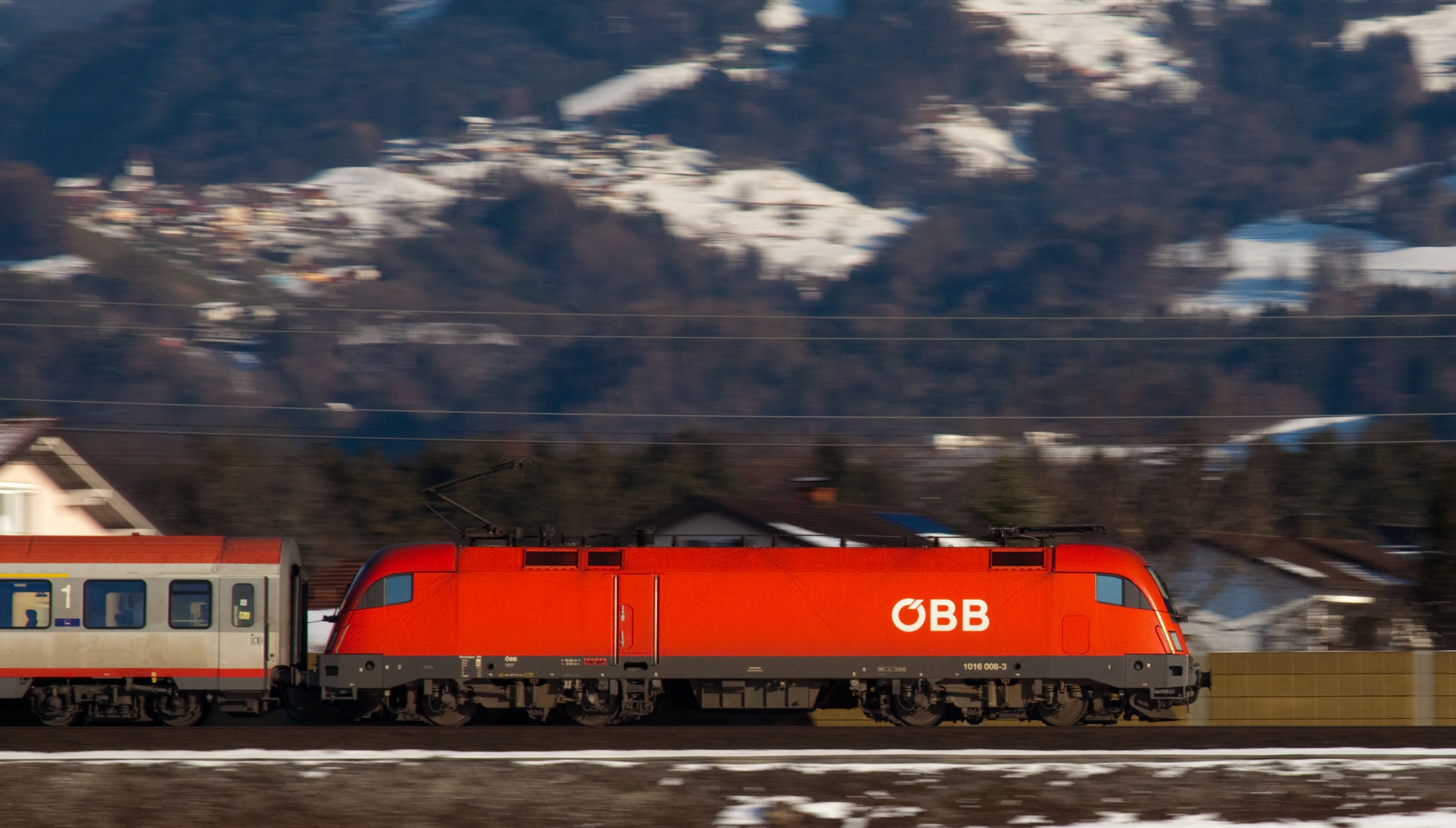
- ÖBB Class 1016 (ES 64 U) with EuroCity train
Type and origin
- Power type: Electric
- Builder: Krauss-Maffei, Siemens
- Model: ES 64 F ES 64 F4; ES 64 U
- Build date: F: 1996–2001; F4: 2003–present U: 2000–present
- Total produced: F: 170; F4: 100+ U: 360+
Specifications
- Configuration
  - AAR: B-B
  - UIC: Bo′Bo′
- Gauge: 1,435 mm (4 ft 8 1/2 in) standard gauge 1,668 mm (5 ft 5 21/32 in) (Portugal)
- Length: 19.58 m (64 ft 2 7/8 in)
- Loco weight: 86–87 tonnes (84.6–85.6 long tons; 94.8–95.9 short tons)
- Electric system/s: 25 kV 50 Hz AC, 15 kV AC, 3 kV DC
- Current pickup: Pantographs
- Traction motors: Four
- Transmission: Electric
- MU working: Yes
- Loco brake: Air and electric
- Train brakes: Air
- Safety systems: Sifa, PZB, ETCS, LZB, various
Performance figures
- Maximum speed: U: 230 km/h (143 mph); F/F4: 140 km/h (87 mph)
- Power output: 6,400 kW (8,580 hp)
- Tractive effort: 300 kN (67,400 lbf)

The EuroSprinter family of electric locomotives is a modular concept of locomotives for the European market built by Siemens Mobility. The internal Siemens product name is ES 64, with ES for EuroSprinter and the number 64 indicating the 6,400 kW power at rail.

Additional information is given in the name on the usage (U as universal, P as prototype and F as freight) and on the number of electric power systems supported (e. g. 2 as two types, 4 as all four systems commonly used in Europe).

== Development ==
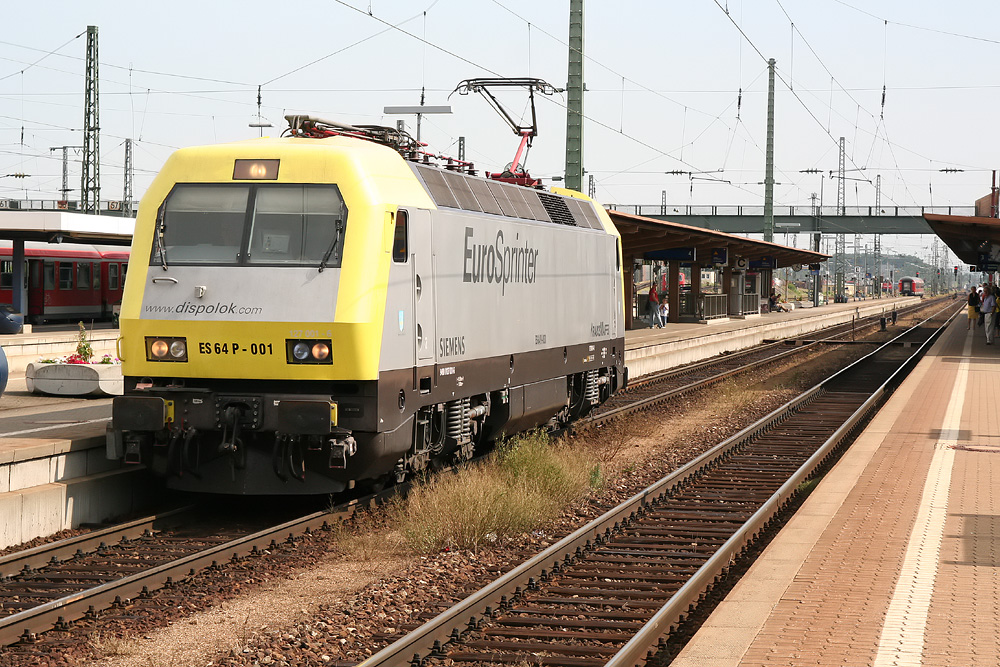
Locomotive of Class 127 in Ingolstadt

The first prototype ES 64 P was built in 1992, as Deutsche Bahn AG was expected to issue a large order of locomotives as a replacement for the ageing Einheits-Elektrolokomotiven. The external appearance was similar to the earlier Siemens/Krauss-Maffei made dual voltage Spanish RENFE Class 252, delivered in 1991, which in turn used three phase asynchronous drive technology introduced with the DB Class 120. The prototype was used for extensive tests in some countries in Europe (Norway, Spain, Portugal, Germany). The prototype was given the DB reporting name Class 127. It is still in service with Dispolok, a formerly Siemens-owned locomotive pool for on-hire use.

== Standard types ==
=== ES 64 F ===
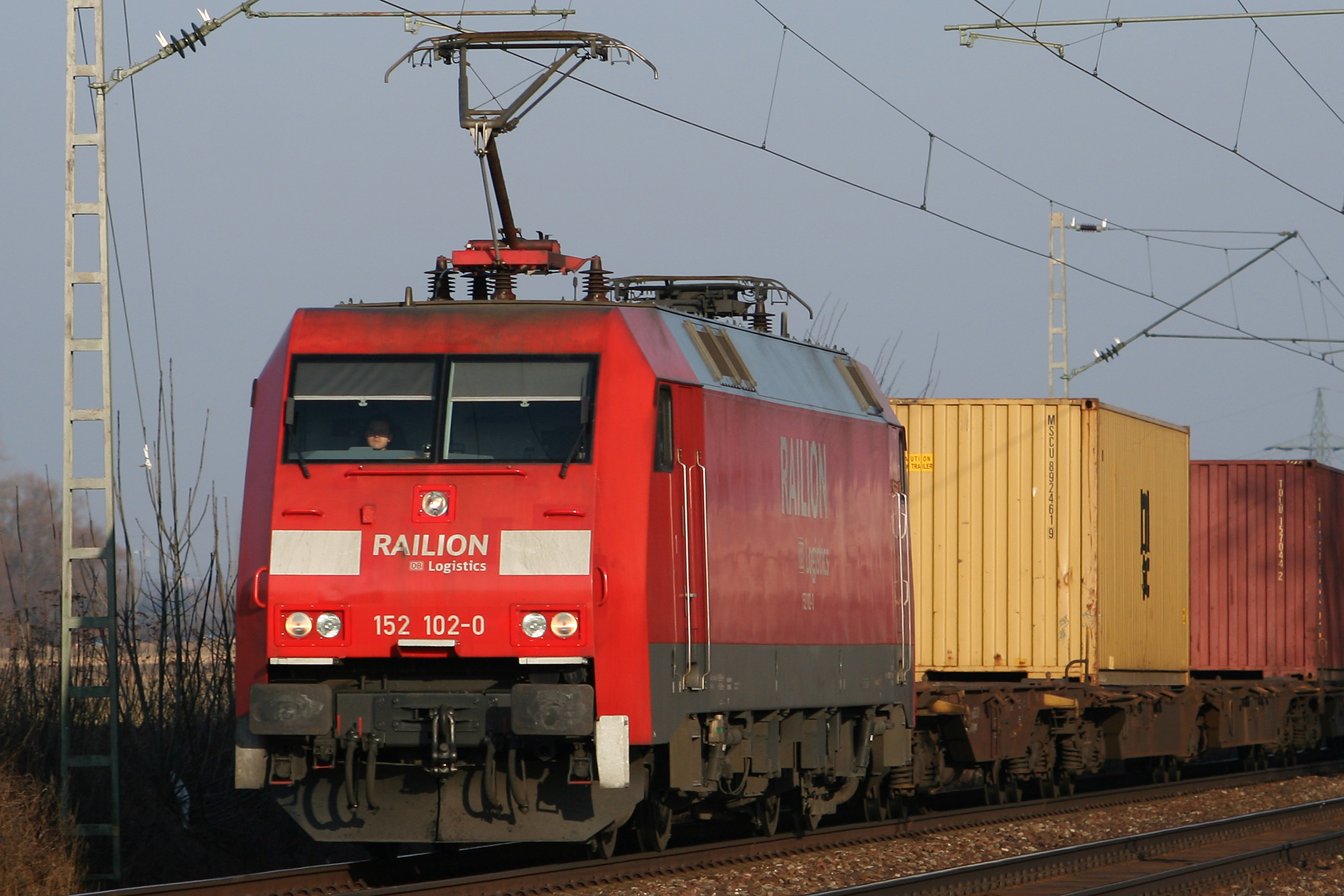
DB AG Class 152

The ES 64 F is an electric freight locomotive with 6,400 kW (8,600 hp) power and a top speed of 140 km/h (87 mph). Though it is equipped for passenger services, it is exclusively used for freight trains. It was introduced to Deutsche Bahn AG as Class 152 in 1996 and today is operated by DB Schenker Rail. Its main role is to replace the older Class 150 and Class 151 locomotives on heavy freight trains. The original German order of 195 units was reduced to 170, as the ÖBB decided that the track forces generated as a result of using nose-suspended traction motors exceeded standards and refused to certify them for use in Austria. Instead, DB AG changed the remaining 25 locomotives to Siemens model ES 64 U2 which were assigned as Class 182.

With Class 152 DB AG abandoned the CoCo wheel arrangement of the class 150 and 151; with the new digitally controlled anti wheel-slip control the tractive effort should be brought to bear more reliably: nonetheless, some engine drivers argue that in autumn, due to greater power and lighter weight, especially with slippery tracks, heavy trains are hard to accelerate.

=== ES 64 F4 ===
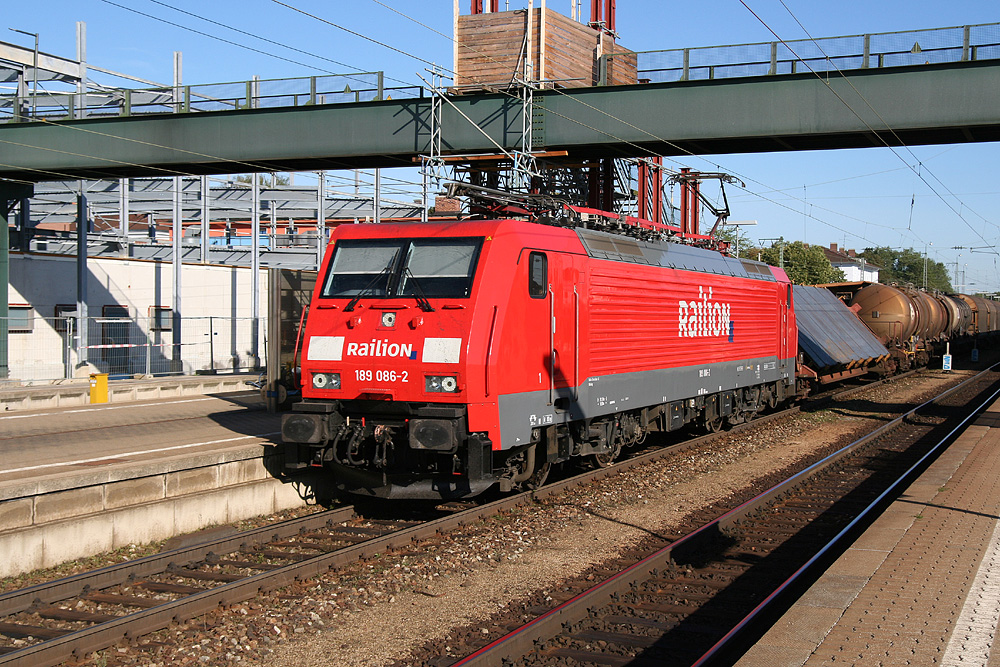
DB AG Class 189

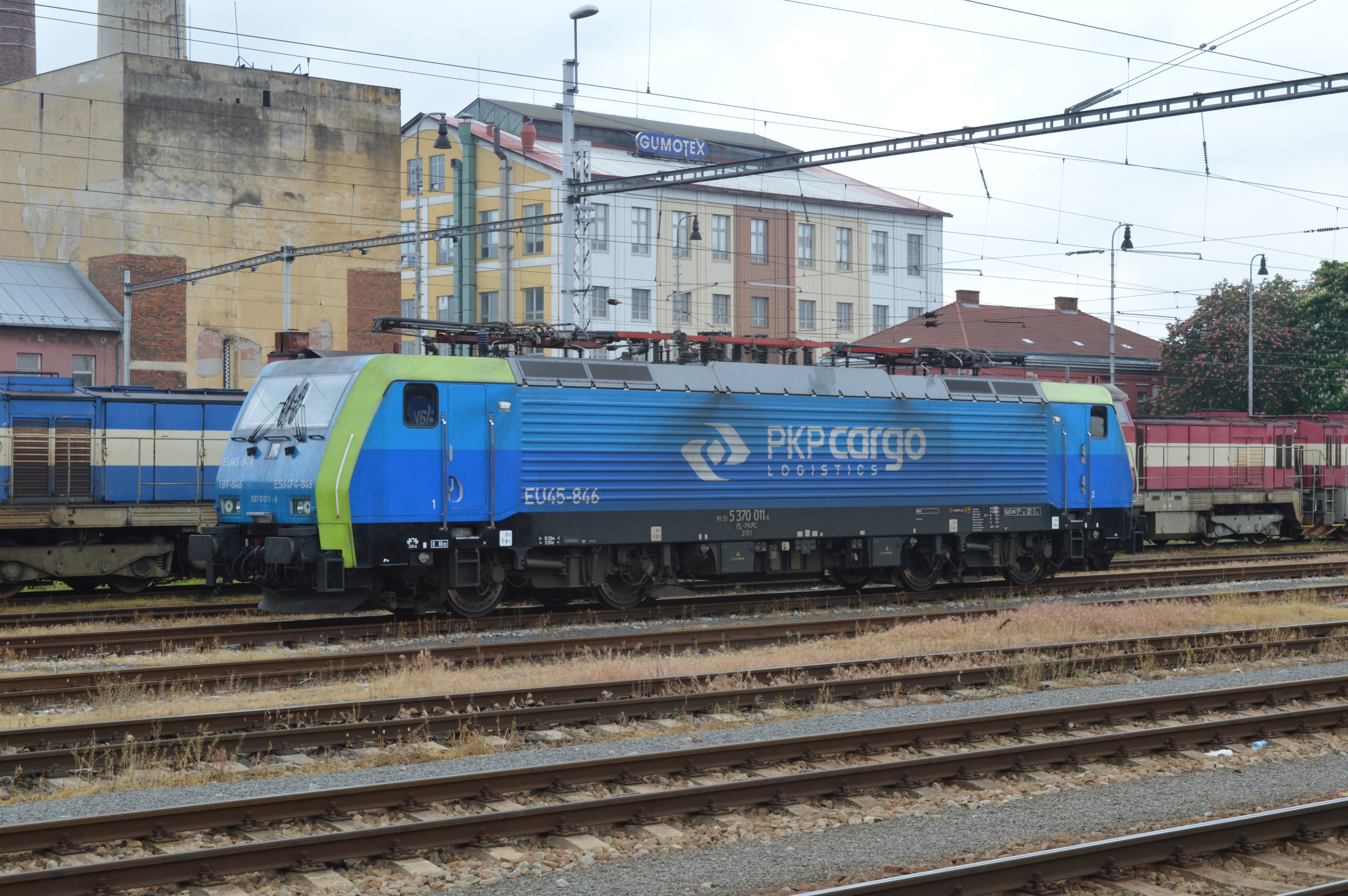
A PKP EU45 at Břeclav.

The ES 64 F4 is an electric freight locomotive with 6,400 kW (8,600 hp) power and a top speed of 140 km/h (87 mph), in Germany the reporting name is Class 189. It is also equipped for passenger service, but seldom used in that role. ES 64 F4 is equipped for all four electric systems commonly used in Europe (15 and 25 kV AC, 1.5 and 3 kV DC). Because limited space inhibits installation of all safety systems, Class 189 is equipped with various packages giving partial European coverage, e. g. Germany and Switzerland. The braking system includes an electrical energy recovery system.

As well as being in service with Deutsche Bahn AG as Class 189, it is also utilized by SBB as Class Re 474 and in service with PKP as class EU45. Some units are available to let from the Dispolok locomotive pool.

=== ES 64 U (Taurus) ===
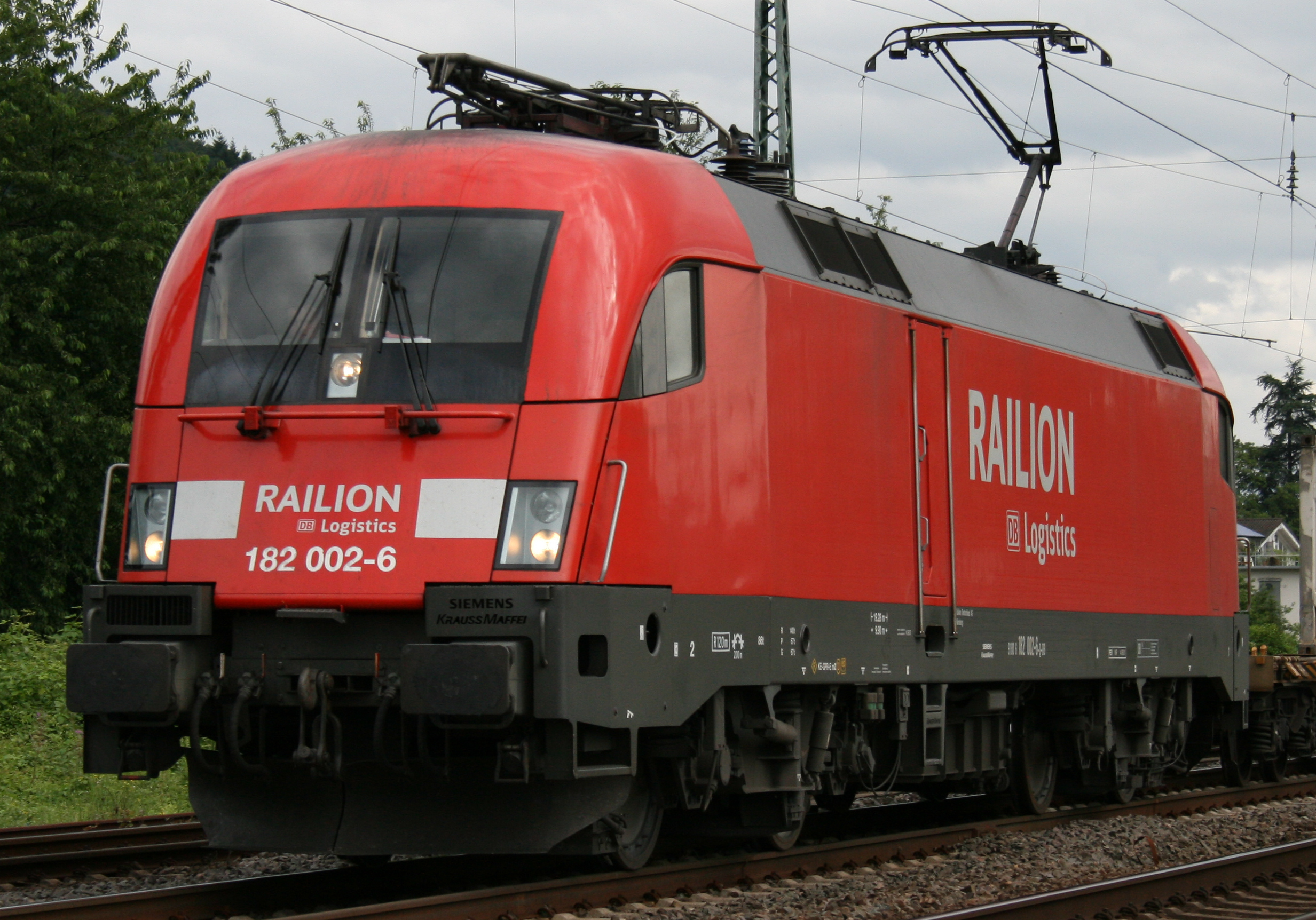
DB AG Class 182

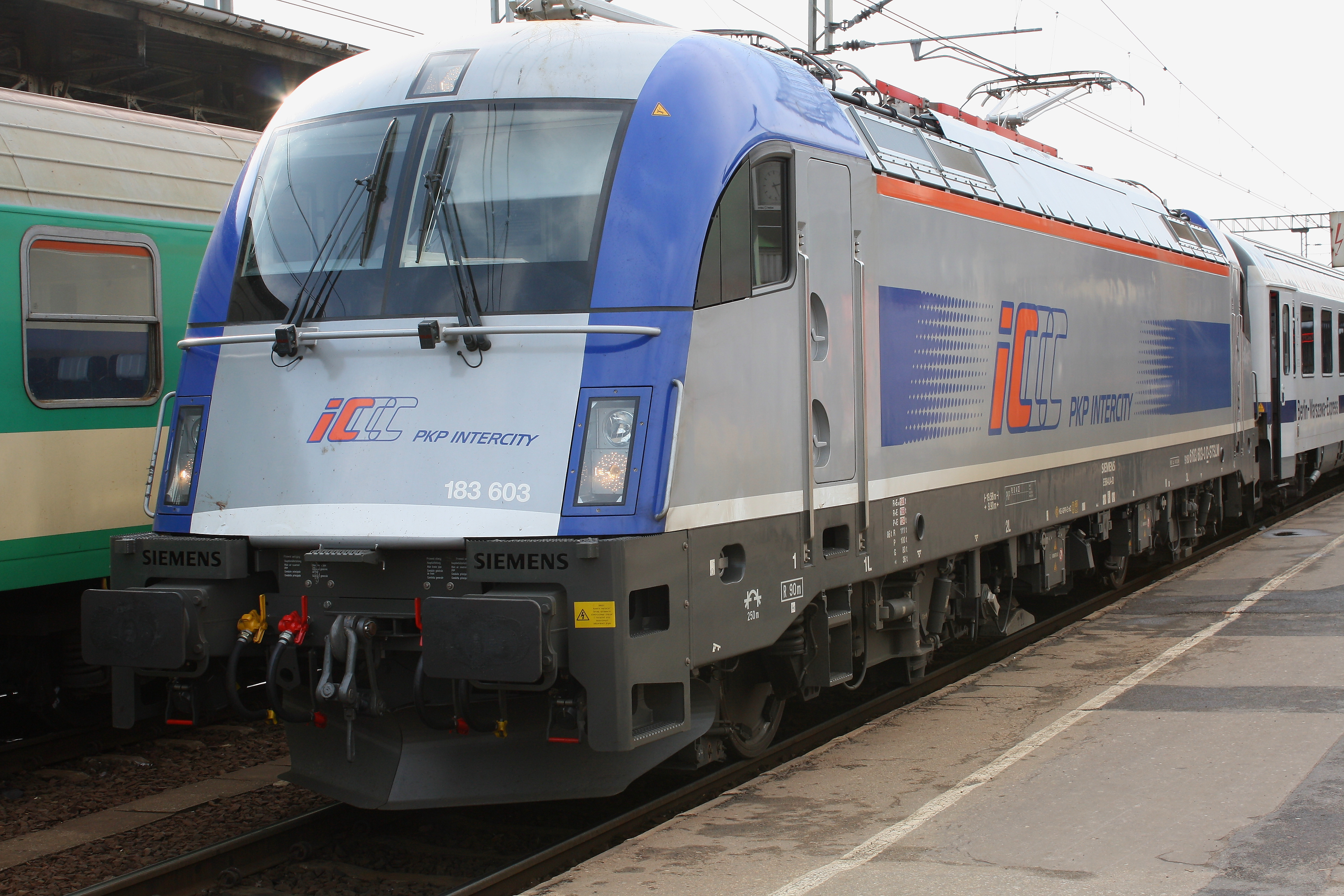
PKP Intercity Class EU44

Based on the Eurosprinter concept the ES 64 U was developed as a universal electric locomotive with a top speed of 230 km/h (140 mph). The series ES 64 U is only capable of operating on the 15 kV 16.7 Hz AC supply. It is in service in Austria with ÖBB as Class 1016. Unlike the F series, all U series are equipped with quill drive instead, thus reducing the track forces. The ÖBB assigned the protected name Taurus to Class 1016 (and later to the Classes 1116 and 1216); since then all ES 64 U+ series are widely known as 'Taurus' locos.

The ES 64 U2 can also operate on 25 kV 50 Hz AC. It is operated by ÖBB as Class 1116, by Deutsche Bahn AG as Class 182 and as well as by MÁV as Class 470 and as a hire locomotive from Dispolok. The Hungarian-Austrian company GySEV (Győr-Sopron-Ebenfurth Railway Corp) operates these units as Class 1047.

All four European electric systems can be used by the ES 64 U4. Its electric components are mostly identical to those of ES 64 F4. The four-system series (with the 1500 V capability disabled within the software) are currently used in Austria by ÖBB and the private operator Rail Traction Service as Class 1216, in Slovenia by Slovenske železnice (SŽ) as Class 541 and in Poland by PKP Intercity (PKP IC) as Class EU44 "Husarz". In Italy RFI assigns it the classification E 190.

Start-up sound of the ES 64 U2 (Taurus) locomotive.

ES64 U and ES 64 U2 locomotives have become notable for the musical-sounding notes, said to resemble an alto saxophone, produced when a train is moving off. The sound comes from the traction converters (German: Stromrichter) and its duration/speed is dependent on the selected acceleration. ES 64 U4 locomotives do not produce this sound.

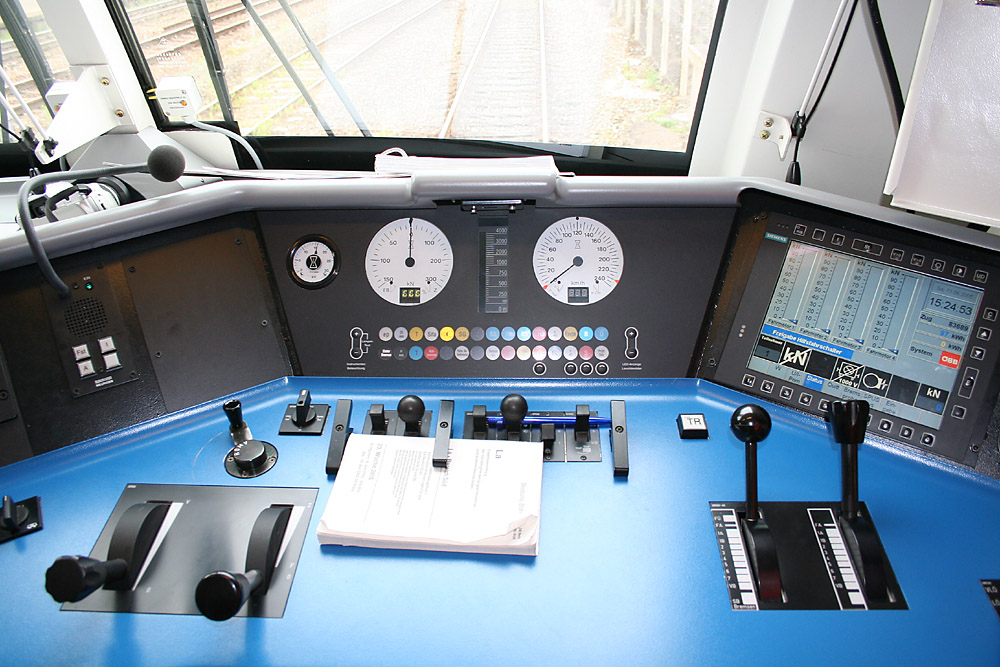
Driver's desk controls of ES 64 U2 of the ÖBB.

A version of the ES 64 U4 was delivered to the Vogtlandbahn of Germany with the designation Class 183. Although the body is the same as any other ES 64 U4 locomotive, it is dual supply and can only operate on the German 15 kV 16.7 Hz AC and the Czech 25 kV 50 Hz AC systems. Even though these locomotives are only equipped to operate under AC power supplies like the DB Class 182, they received a new class designation because they meet the revised EU Driver Protection Standards which required significant structural changes: these include the entrance doors, from one on each side nearer to the middle of the locomotive to two on each side directly into the locomotive cab.

On 2 September 2006 the locomotive 1216 025-5 (prior to delivery to ÖBB) set a new world record for conventional electric locomotives, when, during the trials near Nürnberg, it reached a top speed of 357 km/h (222 mph). The locomotive was not modified for the record. Since then, this type has become the fastest locomotive in the world.

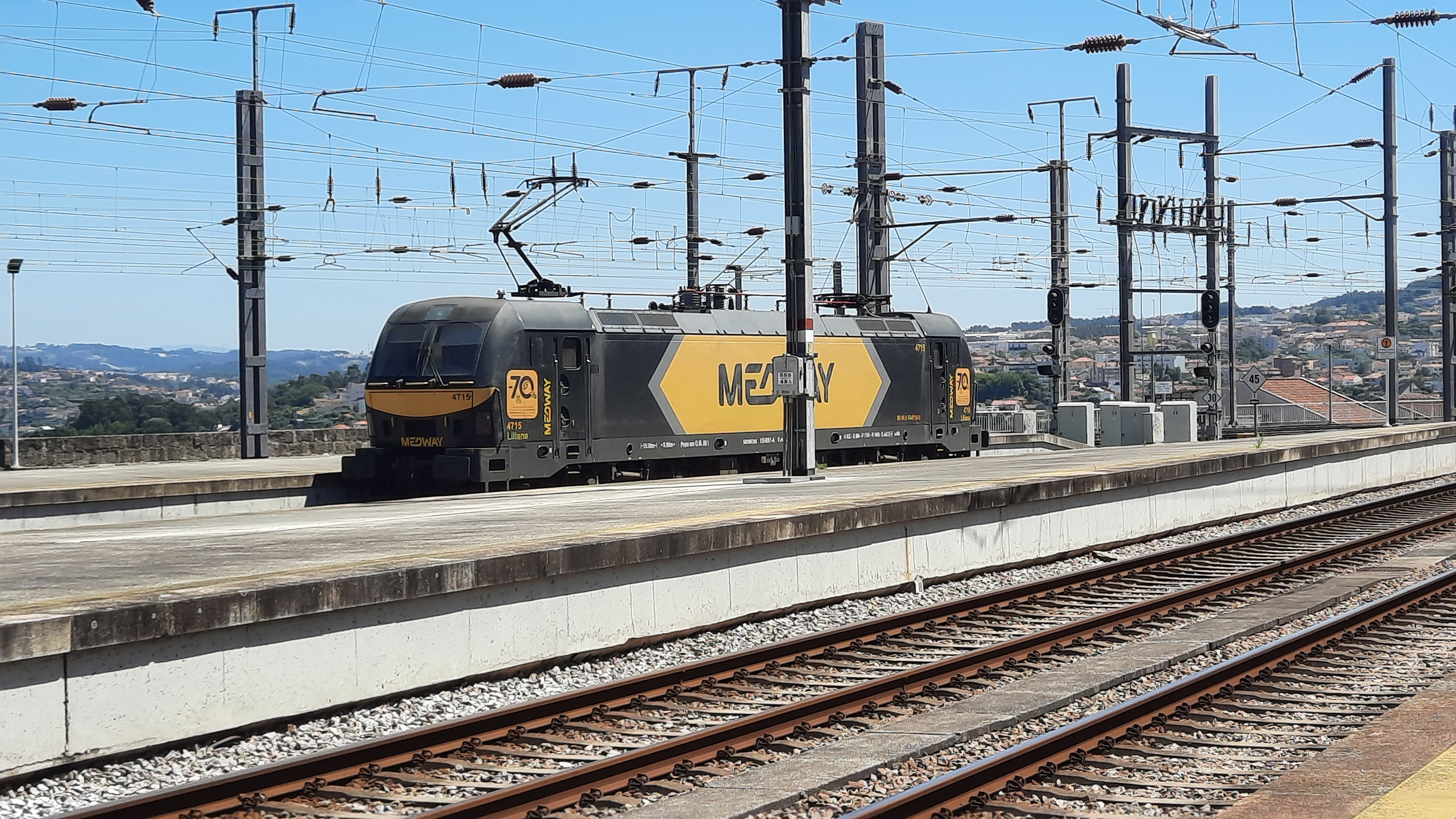
CP 4700 at Porto-Campanhã

== Derivatives ==
=== Portuguese CP Class 4700 ===
Also called EuroSprinter ES46B1 are rated at 4,700 kilowatts (6,300 hp); these 25 engines use the new Siemens safety cab (later used on Vectron). They are mostly used on freight trains.

=== Belgian SNCB/NMBS Class 18 ===
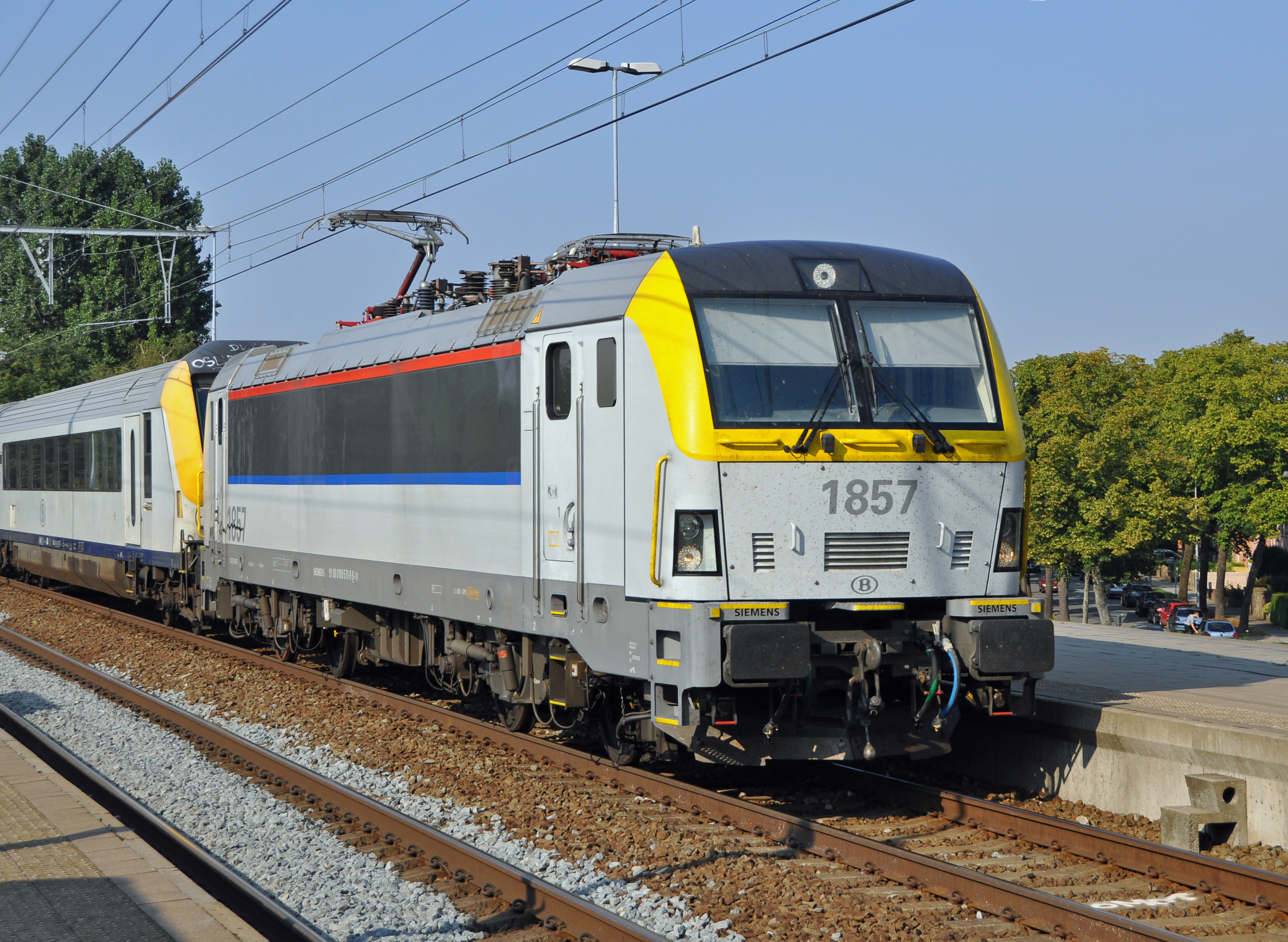
A SNCB Class 18

Also called EuroSprinter ES60U3, these 120 engines, also featuring the new Siemens safety cab are rated at 6,000 kilowatts (8,000 hp) instead of 6,400 due to the heavier cab, the high-speed bogies (200 kilometres per hour (120 mph)) and the multi-system equipment. They are used by NMBS/SNCB on passenger trains only. 24 of them, forming Class 19, are used in fixed consists on M6 rail cars with a GF automatic coupling in order to combine two sets together.

=== Danish Class EG ===
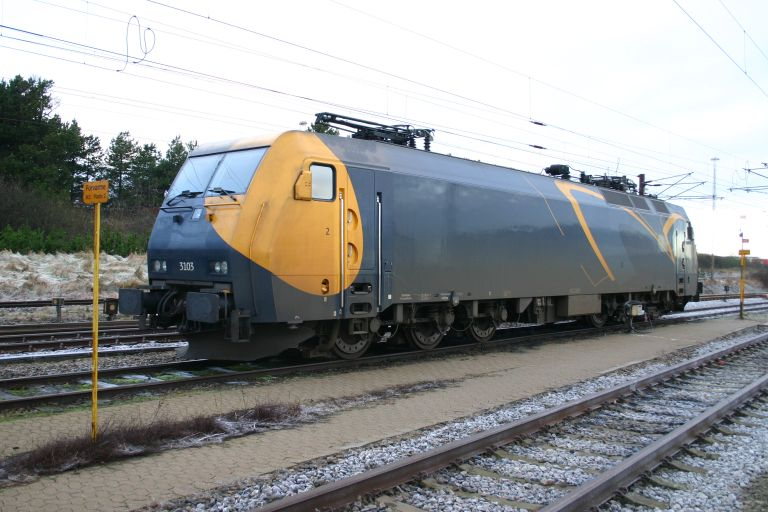
Class EG in the former DSB livery

For the newly built crossing of the Danish Straits (Great Belt Fixed Link) the Danske Statsbaner ordered 13 units of the Class EG which were delivered from 1999 to 2000. Based on the Eurosprinter concept, the wheel arrangement was modified to Co'Co' in order to ensure maximum tractive effort on the ramps. The tractive effort with this class is 400 kN (90,000 lbf) instead of the usual 300 kN (67,000 lbf), with an overall length of 20.95 m (68 ft 9 in). This type is closest in design to a second generation ES 64 F2, capable of operating under 15 kV and 25 kV AC.

=== Greek Class 120 ===
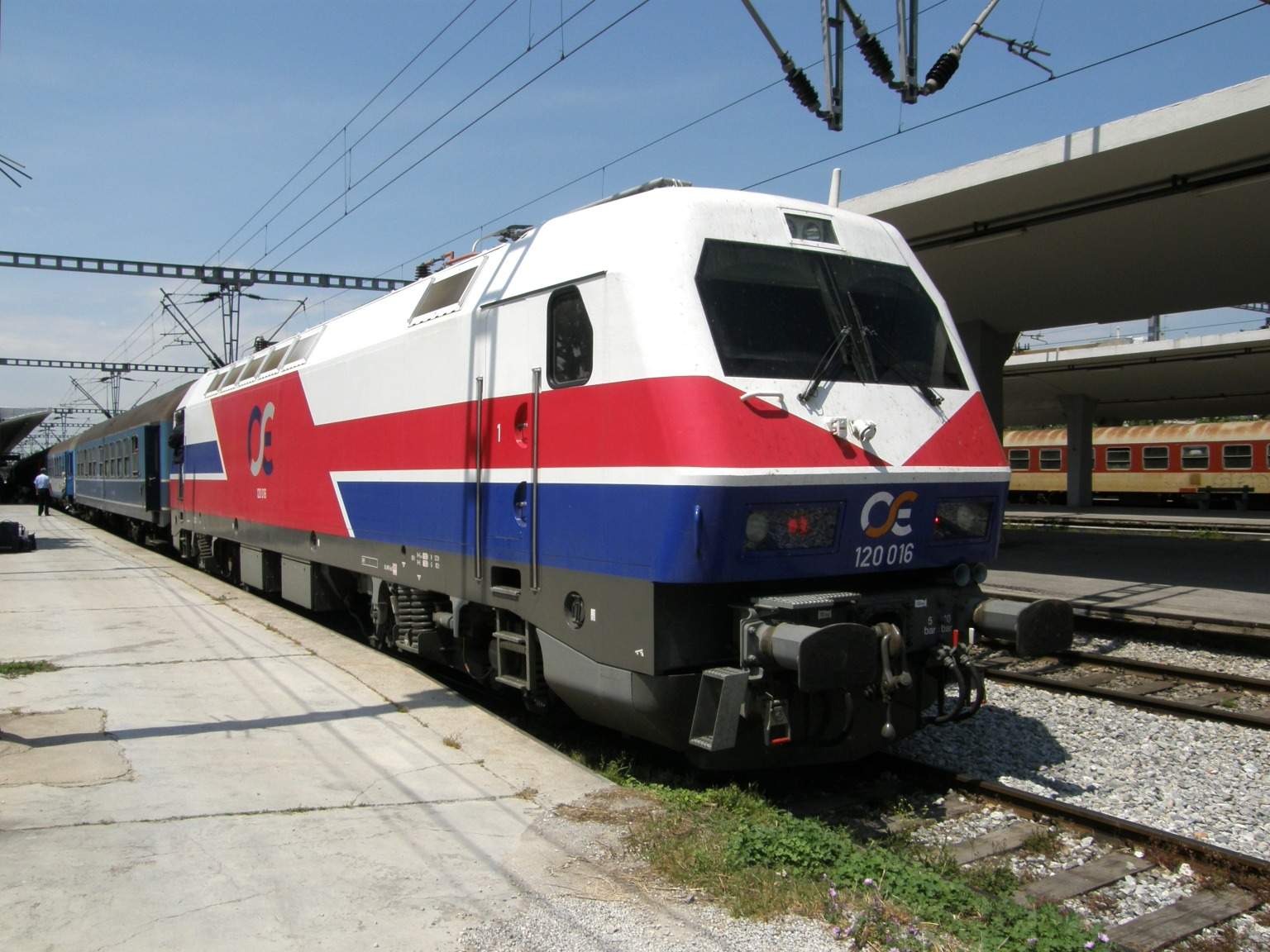
Greek HellasSprinter locomotive.

The OSE Class 120 is the first electric locomotives in service in Greece. From 1996 to 2001 a total of 30 class 120 were delivered. The concept is mostly identical the ES 64 P prototype, with changes to the power (5,000 kW or 6,700 hp) and the electric system (25 kV AC).

=== China Railways DJ1 ===
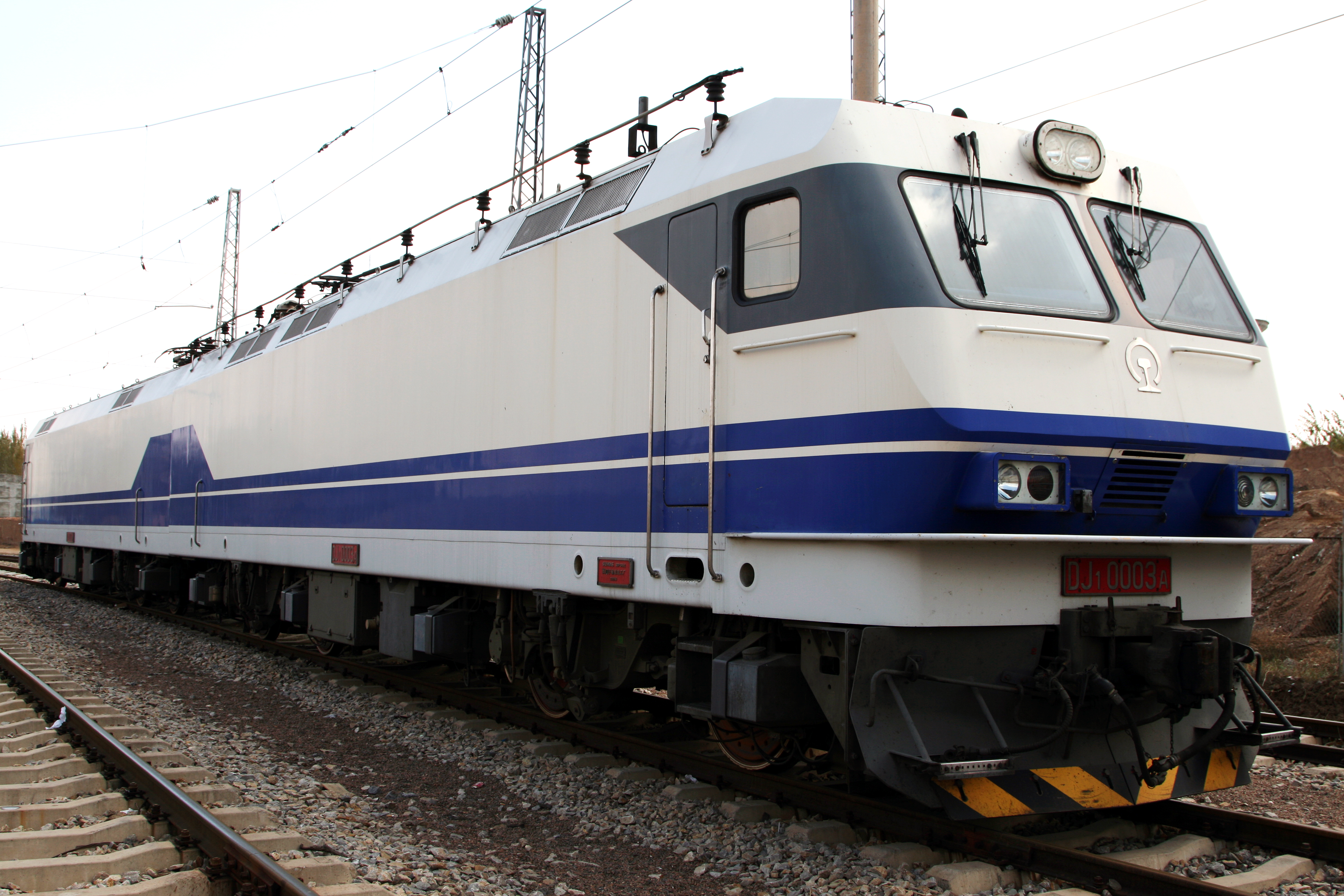
DJ1-0003 on Datong–Qinhuangdao railway

The Chinese Ministry of Railways purchased 20 units of type DJ1 freight locomotives, in which the design is based on second generation of EuroSprinter platform, from a joint venture formed by Siemens and Zhuzhou Electric Locomotive Works in 1997. Each 8 axle 2(Bo'Bo') locomotive consists of two coupled single cab 4 axle units.

=== China Railways HXD1 ===
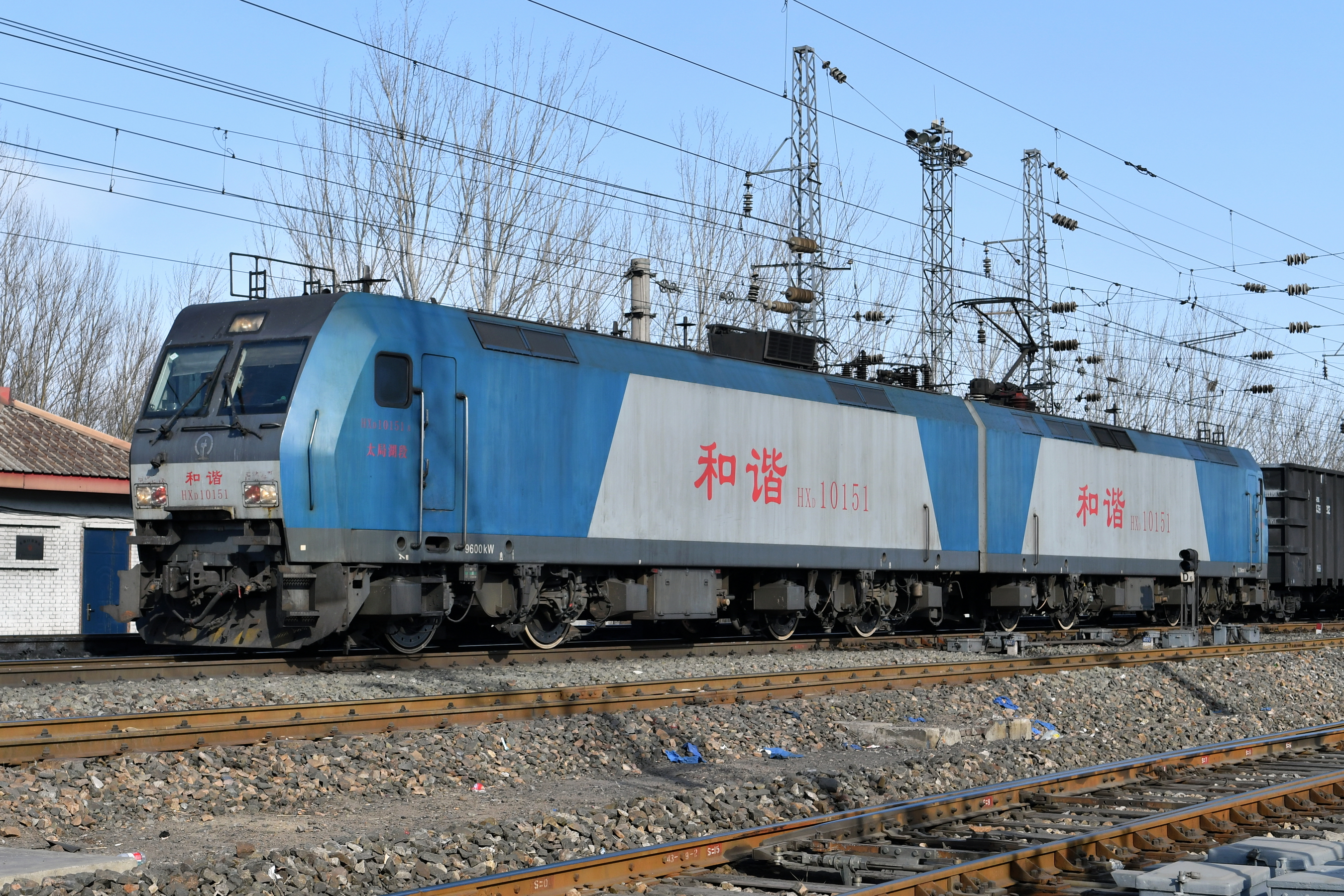
HXD10151 on Datong–Qinhuangdao railway

Initially named DJ4, successor of the DJ1, with more powerful traction motors, higher traction effort and IGBT traction inverters. These locomotives were mainly used for running freight schedules of the Daqin Railway.

=== China Railways HXD1B ===
On August 18, 2007, Siemens and Zhuzhou won a contract from the Ministry of Railways to build 500 Co'Co' EuroSprinter-based locomotives, at the time of production the locomotives are amongst the most powerful in the world in commercial production with a power of 9.6 MW (12,900 hp).

=== Korail 8100, 8200 ===
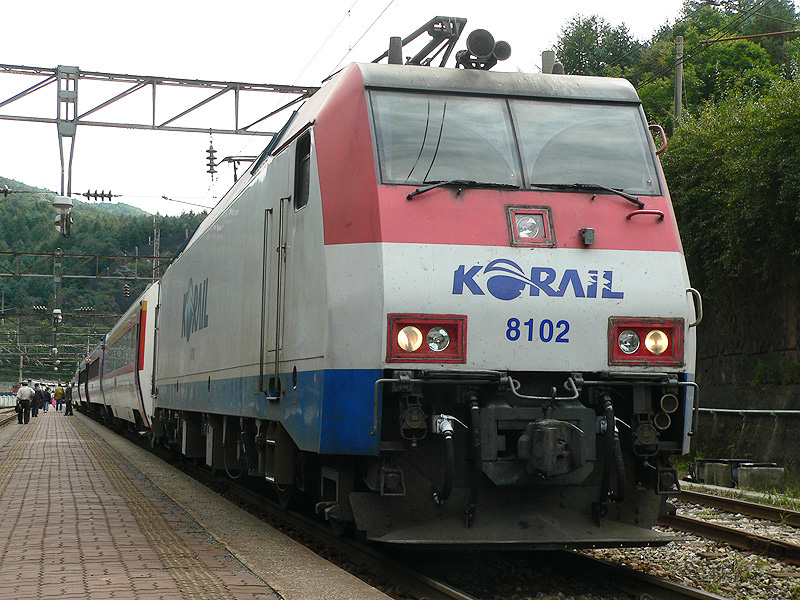
Korail 8100 locomotive

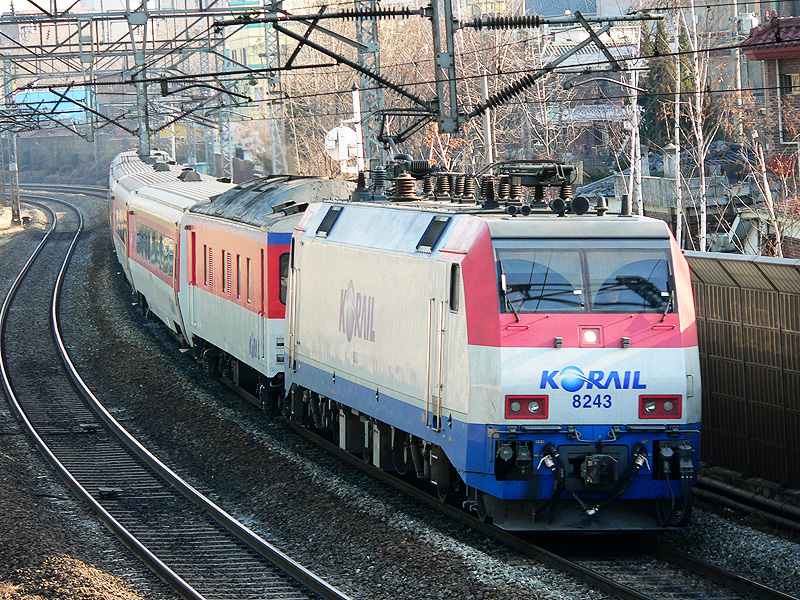
Korail 8200 locomotive

Since 2000, Korea Railroad Corporation (Korail) has continuously built ES64Fs to replace older class 8000 ELs. The Korail 8000 class electric locomotives are powerful but too slow (85 km/h or 53 mph maximum) to operate for general passenger train. Currently, 85 ES64F variants are built (2 of Class 8100 and 83 of Class 8200).

These new 8100s and 8200s are operating on major Korail lines, including Gyeongbu, Honam, and Jungang Line.

=== Amtrak Cities Sprinter (ACS-64) ===
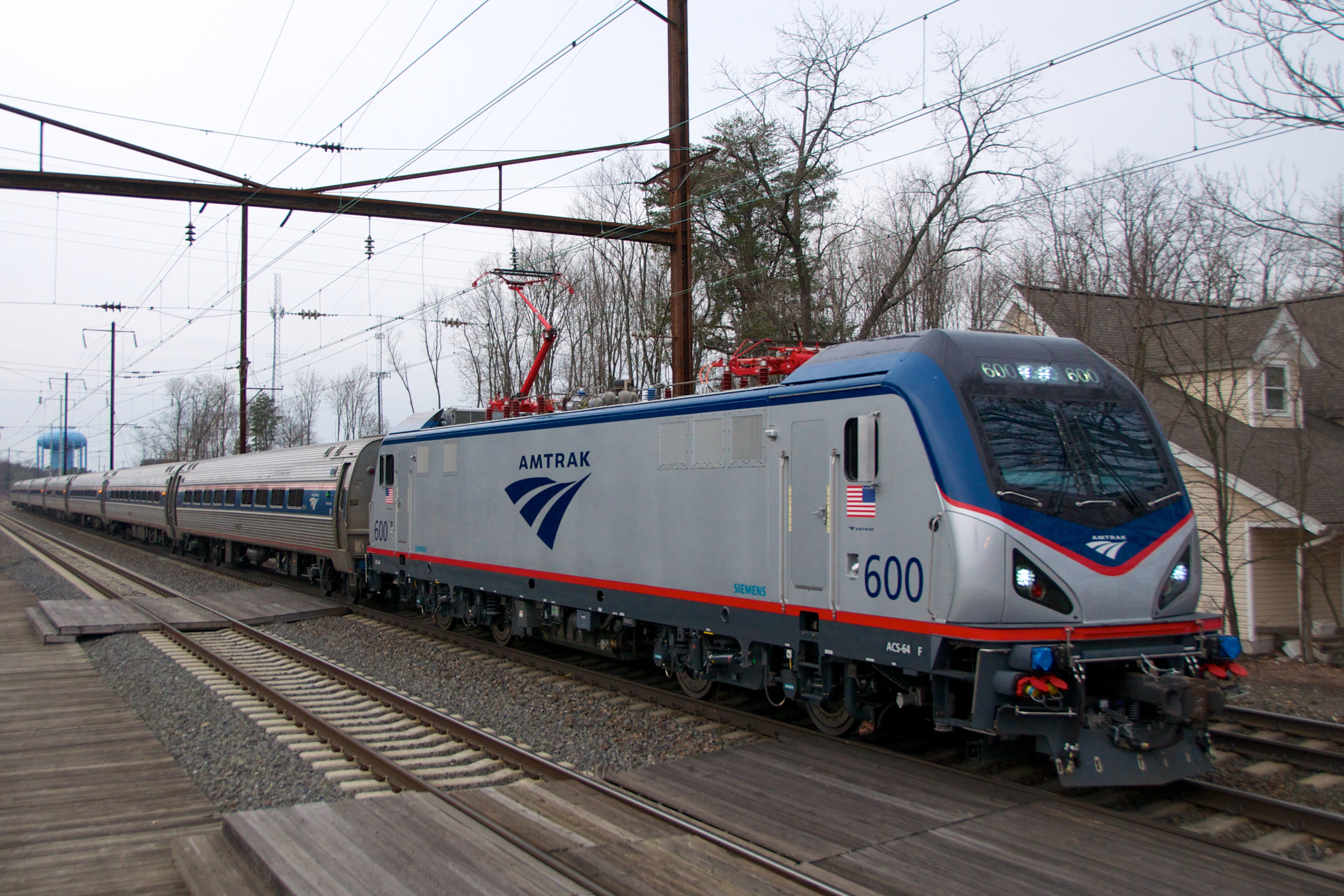
Amtrak ACS-64

The ACS-64 (Cities Sprinter) design is based on the EuroSprinter, but with substantial modifications to meet United States safety standards including crumple zones and an improved safety cage for the driver. It supports all three catenary voltages used in the northeast U.S. (Amtrak's 25 Hz Traction Power System, Amtrak's 60 Hz Traction Power System & Electrification of the New York, New Haven and Hartford Railroad), which is the only region with substantial intercity electrification.

== Successor ==
In 2010 Siemens announced a successor design, named 'Vectron' incorporating design features of both the Eurosprinter, and Eurorunner locomotives, initially available only in an electric version. The Eurosprinter design is to be continued to be offered by Siemens as well in the short term.

== Accidents and incidents ==
On 4 April 2023, a DBAG Class 189 locomotive was hauling a freight train that collided with a road-rail crane obstructing the line at Voorschoten, South Holland, Netherlands. The crane landed in the path of a passenger train operated by a NS VIRM unit. The passenger train was derailed. One person was killed and 30 were injured.

== See also ==
- Contemporaries and potential competitors in the European electric locomotive market:
  - Alstom (Formerly Bombardier) TRAXX
  - Škoda 109E
  - Alstom Prima
  - 'Lok 2000' family of locomotives produced by ABB/Adtranz for Swiss (SBB-CFF-FFS Re 460), Norwegian (NSB El 18) and Finnish Railways (VR Class Sr2)
- Contemporary Siemens locomotive products
  - Siemens Eurorunner
  - Siemens Asiarunner
  - Siemens ACS-64

== Sources ==
- Baur, Karl Gerhard (2003). TAURUS - Lokomotiven für Europa. Freiburg: Eisenbahn-Kurier-Verlag. ISBN 978-3-88255-182-2.
- Pedersen, Bo Oldrup; Jörgensen, Ole Aaboe; Pröll, Günther. Co'Co'-Zweifrequenzlokomotive EG 3100 für Danske Statsbaner. München: Oldenbourg.
- Inderst, Markus (2002). "Europalok auf Rampenstrecken. Neue DB-Baureihe 189". Lok Magazin. 41 (255): 28. ISSN 0458-1822.
- Koschinski, Konrad (January 2003). "Taurus & Hercules - DB-182, ÖBB-1016/1116, MAV-1047.0, GySEV-1047.5, Siemens-Dispolok, ÖBB-2016. Sonderausgabe". Eisenbahn Journal. ISSN 0720-051X.
