= BLS Cargo Nord =

Belgian rail freight company

- Formerly: Crossrail Benelux; Dillen & Le Jeune Cargo
- Type: Subsidiary
- Industry: Rail freight
- Founded: 2000
- Founder: Ronny Dillen; Jeroen Le Jeune
- Headquarters: Deurne, Belgium
- Area served: Port of Antwerp, Belgium
- Parent: BLS Cargo
- Website: www.blscargo.ch/en/blscargonord

BLS Cargo Nord, formerly Crossrail Benelux and Dillen & Le Jeune Cargo, is a Belgian rail freight company. It is a subsidiary of BLS Cargo.

== History ==
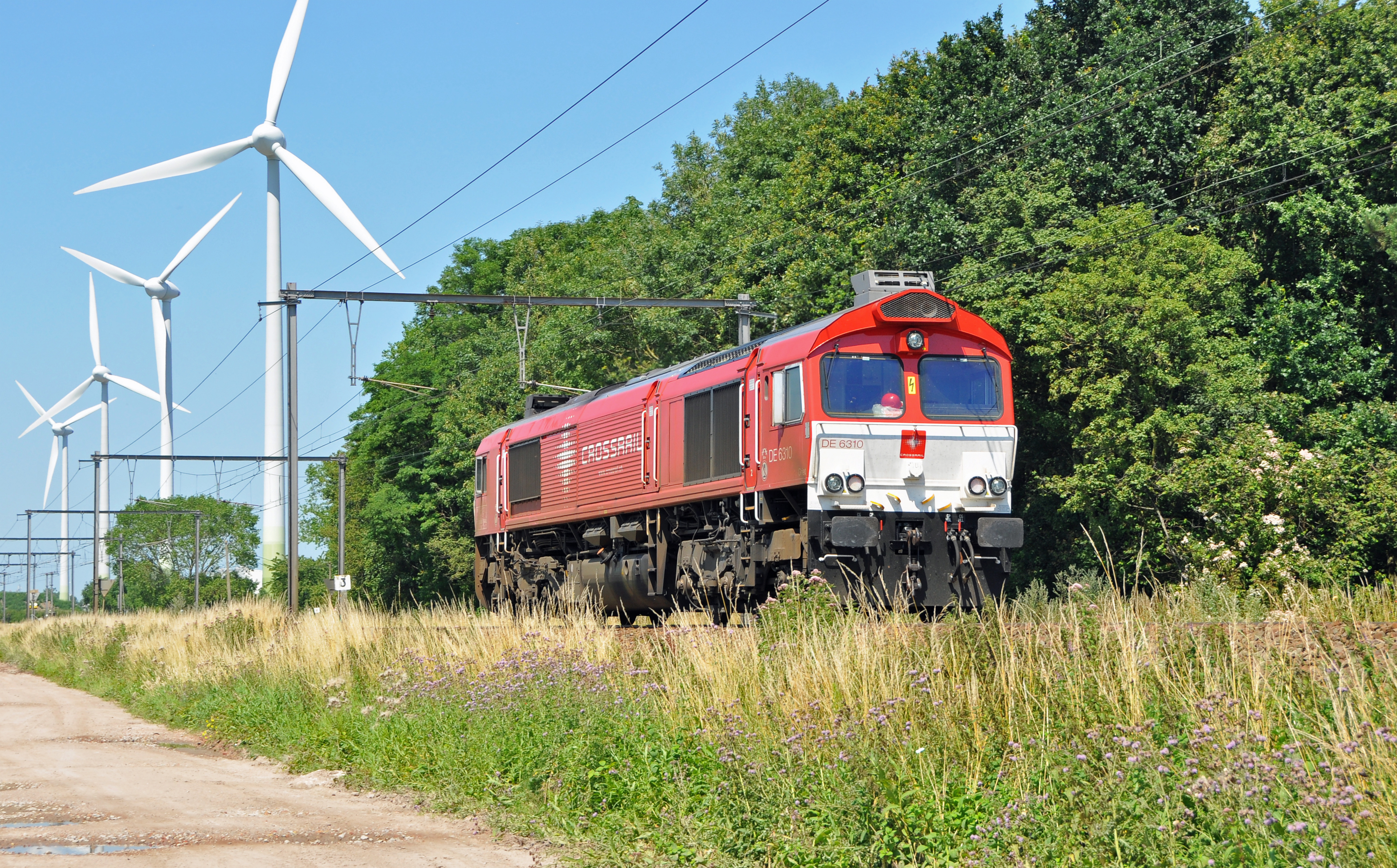
Crossrail Class 66 near Bruges in July 2012

Dillen & Le Jeune Cargo (DLC) was formed in 2000 by Ronny Dillen and Jeroen Le Jeune. It was the first private company to operate freight trains in Belgium. In October 2001, Hupac became a shareholder.

In April 2002, the first container train was hauled for MSC from Port of Antwerp to Aachen West station by a Class 66 locomotive and onwards to Schwandorf station with a Hupac hired electric locomotive, breaking the monopoly of state owned NMBS/SNCB.

A license to access the Dutch network was obtained at the beginning of 2003, with the first train hauled to Waalhaven on 31 January. Trains to and from the Zeelandic Flanders (a part of Netherlands which is not directly connected to the remainder of the Dutch rail network) became recurring traffic, with the Terneuzen based Bertschi container terminal as client.

In October 2007, DLC merged with Babcock & Brown owned Crossrail. Hupac sold its stake with Ronny Dillen and Jeroen Le Jeune each having 25.5% and Babcock & Brown 49%.

Problems between both founders resulted in August 2008 in Jeroen Le Jeune leaving the company for a few months. As Babcock & Brown was facing strong difficulties after the global credit crunch, Jeroen Le Jeune purchased its 49% shareholding in August 2009 along with Ronny Dillen's shares.

In September 2009, Crossrail successfully sued Belgian rail network manager Infrabel for having given full priority to passenger traffic instead of treating all rail operators equally during a strike.

As traffic grew, Le Jeune quickly faced liquidity problems and searched partners to refund the company: The first candidate was no newcomer. Hupac took a 25% participation on 24 August 2010. As of February 2012, two customers of the company, LKW Walter and Général Transport Service, acquired shareholdings of 25% and 10% respectively, with Le Jeune’s reduced to 40%. Two other customers, Bertschi and MSC, each acquired 10% shareholdings from Le Jeune in July 2012.

In April 2016, control of the company passed to Rhenus Group (75%) and LKW Walter (25%). The Swiss division was split off, sold and merged to Cargologic in 2018.

In March 2019, BLS Cargo acquired Crossrail Benelux, and in 2020 Crossrail Benelux became a full division of the BLS Cargo group, providing traction services in Germany and Belgium exclusively for BLS Cargo, and the customer contracts were transferred to BLS Cargo.

On 1 September 2025, Crossrail Benelux was rebranded BLS Cargo Nord. and continues under the BLS Cargo brand. The core business remains unchanged: BLS Cargo Nord operates BLS Cargo trains in Belgium, the Netherlands and Germany.
