= RAIL4CHEM =

- Type: mit beschränkter Haftung (mbH.)
- Industry: Rail freight
- Founded: 2000
- Founder: BASF, Hoyer Group, VTG AG, Bertschi
- Defunct: 2010
- Fate: Underperforming, absorbed
- Successor: Captrain deutschland
- Headquarters: Essen, Germany
- Area served: Europe : Germany, Switzerland, Benelux, Poland
- Key people: Sven Flore (COO); Thomas Kratzer (managing director); Mark Bertram (managing director)
- Number of employees: ~180 (2008)
- Subsidiaries: rail4chem Benelux B.V. rail4chem transalpin AG fer Polska S.A.
- Website: www.rail4chem.com

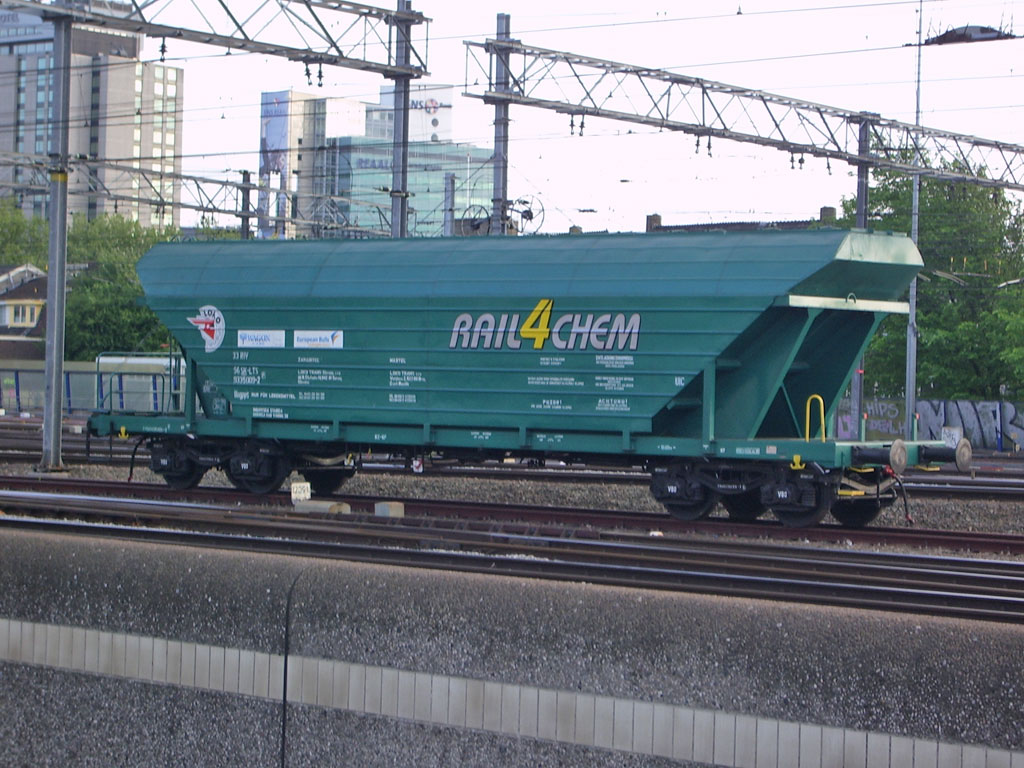
Goods wagon from Rail4Chem in Utrecht Centraal railway station, May 2006

RAIL4CHEM was a German rail freight transport company, and the parent company of a number of European subsidiary rail freight transport companies including rail4chem Benelux B.V. (Rotterdam), the rail4chem transalpin AG (Basel) and Fer Polska S.A. (Warsaw).

The business was acquired by Veolia Cargo in 2008, which was acquired by SNCF in 2009. In 2010 the company was grouped under SNCF's new freight train brand Captrain, and absorbed into the Captrain Deutschland subdivision, and became a provider to the division of long distance freight trains.

== History ==
In 2000 the railway company RAIL4CHEM was founded as a joint venture among three German companies: BASF (Ludwigshafen), Hoyer Group and VTG AG (both located in Hamburg) and one Swiss firm Bertschi; headquartered in Dürrenäsch. Hoyer merged its rail freight subsidiary (Hoyer Railserv, formed 2000 from RSE Cargo. (Note: Hoyer Railserv GmbH. was a rail freight subsidiary of Hoyer; formed in October 2000 by the acquisition (95%) and renaming of RSE Cargo GmbH. by Hoyer - Hoyer entered the rail freight market to obtain a more economical transportation cost than that offered by Deutsche Bahn. Hoyer Railserv primarily operated tank trains. Its initial freight flows were for transportation of chemicals between Hamburg, Dormagen, and Brunsbüttel. It later (2001) operated container trains between Bremerhaven and the chemical complex at Schkopau.)) into the company in 2002.

Initially the company was set up as a rail freight service for chemical companies. The organisation serves both national and international freight movements within Europe. Later the company took on non-chemical industry freight work.

Amongst the first workings were the movement of chemicals from the works at BASF Ludwigshafen to Aachen to be moved further by the Belgian state railway SNCB / NMBS.

In 2004 the company gained a safety certificate to operate in the Netherlands, and in Switzerland. In 2005 the founder companies increased the capital of the company by €4 million to €5 million to enable the purchase of multi-system electric locomotives. Safety certificate for operations in Belgium was acquired (by the subsidiary Rail4chem Benelux BV) in January 2006, and for operations in France in February 2006,

On 20 February 2008 it was announced that the business was to be sold to the French company Veolia Cargo for an undisclosed sum. Veolia Cargo was acquired by SNCF (and Eurotunnel), with Rail4chem becoming part of SNCF; it was reorganised into the Captrain railfreight operation division of SNCF. The business underperformed during the difficult market conditions of the Great Recession and was absorbed into the Captrain deutschland division in 2010.

RAIL4CHEM was a founder member of the European Bulls Rail Freight Alliance, a European consortium of European rail freight operating companies.

=== Subsidiaries ===
In late 2004, RAIL4CHEM established a new subsidiary company: Rail4Chem Benelux NV, after the acquiring and taking over the activities of Dutch private rail carrier ShortLines BV. (Note: ShortLines was the first private rail operator in the Netherlands, established in 1998. Liquidated in 2004 after acquisition by Rail4chem.)

Rail4Chem Benelux's main business was the transportation of containers from the Port of Rotterdam to Germany but also operated international tank trains to DSM in Geleen as well as intermodal trains via Amsterdam and cereal trains via Europoort.

== Operations ==
RAIL4CHEM was certified to operate in Germany, Netherlands, Switzerland, Belgium and France.

The trains known as 'mobile pipelines' are operated between the BASF operations in Antwerp and Ludwigshafen.

Up till the opening of the Betuweroute only diesel locomotives were used in the Netherlands.

== Rolling stock ==
In 2005 the electric locomotive fleet of RAIL4CHEM consisted of 14 locomotives of TRAXX type, and predecessors; the Adtranz built DBAG Class 145 (for work in Germany), and the Bombardier Transportation built DBAG Class 185 (for work in Germany, Austria, and Switzerland). Other locomotives such as the Siemens EuroSprinter ES 64 U2 have been used based on requirements, as well as older locomotives have also been used in Switzerland. The company leased Re 4/4I (Re 416 626), which had previously belonged to MThB and SBB to operate fuel trains on Swiss rails, as can be seen here:

For non-electrified lines in Germany, Netherlands and Belgium, locomotives of the diesel types EMD JT42CWR (Class 66), as well as Vossloh locomotives, primarily Vossloh G 2000 BB and MaK G 1206 types were used.

== See also ==
- List of German railway companies
