= OFP La Rochelle =

Rail Freight Company

OFP La Rochelle-Maritime Rail Services
- Company type: joint stock
- Industry: Logistics
- Founded: 12 October 2010
- Headquarters: La Rochelle, France
- Key people: Philippe Guillard (President)
- Owner: Euro Cargo Rail, Grand Port Maritime de La Rochelle

OFP La Rochelle is a rail freight company; a joint venture between Euro Cargo Rail and the port of La Rochelle. The company began operations in October 2010.

== History ==
In December 2009 the NaviRail Atlantique was formed as an Opérateur Ferroviaire de Proximité - a type of short line railway company - and port railway operator for the port of La Rochelle; the company was to be a joint venture between SNCF (49%) and the port (51%), however due to SNCF's doubts about the profitability of the enterprise formation the company was not finalised. Due to this the port authority sought an agreement with Euro Cargo Rail.

In 2010 OFP La Rochelle was formed as a joint stock company; (Note: "OFP" Opérateur ferroviaire de proximité (French Opérateur ferroviaire de proximité), a type of Shortline railroad) with Grand Port Maritime de La Rochelle contributing 75.1% of the share capital and Euro Cargo Rail 24.9%. It is responsible for short-haul freight operations around the port of La Rochelle. The first train, in October 2010, carried petroleum products to the Creuse.

At start up the company had a fleet of two Vossloh G1000 and four Class 77 locomotives. Potential traffic included cereal, forest and paper products, and petroleum; the company hoped to increase the modal share of traffic from the port from 7 to 10% by 2011.

After one year of operation the company had transported 100 kilotonnes of freight.
