= CD66 =

CD66 may refer to:

- Carcinoembryonic antigen, cluster of differentiation
- CargoNet CD66, a diesel locomotive
