= Lage Landen Lijn =

Proposed rail service

The Lage Landen Lijn (Low Countries Line) was a proposed international rail service between The Hague and Brussels, which was to be introduced on 15 December 2013.

== Plans ==
The initiative was a response by the municipality of The Hague to the scrapping of the hourly Beneluxtrein service in December 2012 in favour of the ill-fated Fyra V250, which in its brief life used the new HSL-Zuid line between Schiphol and Rotterdam and bypassed Den Haag HS, Dordrecht, Roosendaal and Mechelen. The proposed service would have run 16 times a day and would have offered the new features of starting at Den Haag Centraal and also serving Delft and Zaventem airport. The Hague pointed out that it is the Netherlands’ political centre and the home of many international organisations, and therefore needs a direct link with the EU institutions in Brussels.

It contacted various railway companies, and established the company The Hague Trains Holding B.V. to start negotiations with the Dutch and Belgian infrastructure companies ProRail and Infrabel respectively. The train paths requested would eventually be transferred to the operating company that won the contract. The municipality would commission feasibility studies and facilitate the project, but explicitly said that it had no intention to subsidise, guarantee or operate the service itself.

== Competition rules ==
Although public transport in the Netherlands and Belgium, in principle, should only be carried out by holders of a concession, the Dutch Passenger Transport Act 2000 makes an exception for cross-border rail services. EU directive 91/440 permits international trains to operate outside a concession, as long as they carry very few domestic passengers. The Netherlands applies this European directive very strictly. The Dutch passengers' organisation Rover objected to the European Commission about this restrictive application of the directive, and negotiations were held with Nederlandse Spoorwegen and the Dutch Ministry of Infrastructure and the Environment. The service would also have to obtain clearance in Belgium, where case law exists on this topic. DB Fernverkehr's ICE Cologne–Brussels service initially did not carry domestic passengers between Brussels and Liège. Later this was allowed with a separate ticket while domestic tickets from SNCB/NMBS were not valid on the ICE. Now this is possible with a surcharge.

== Status ==
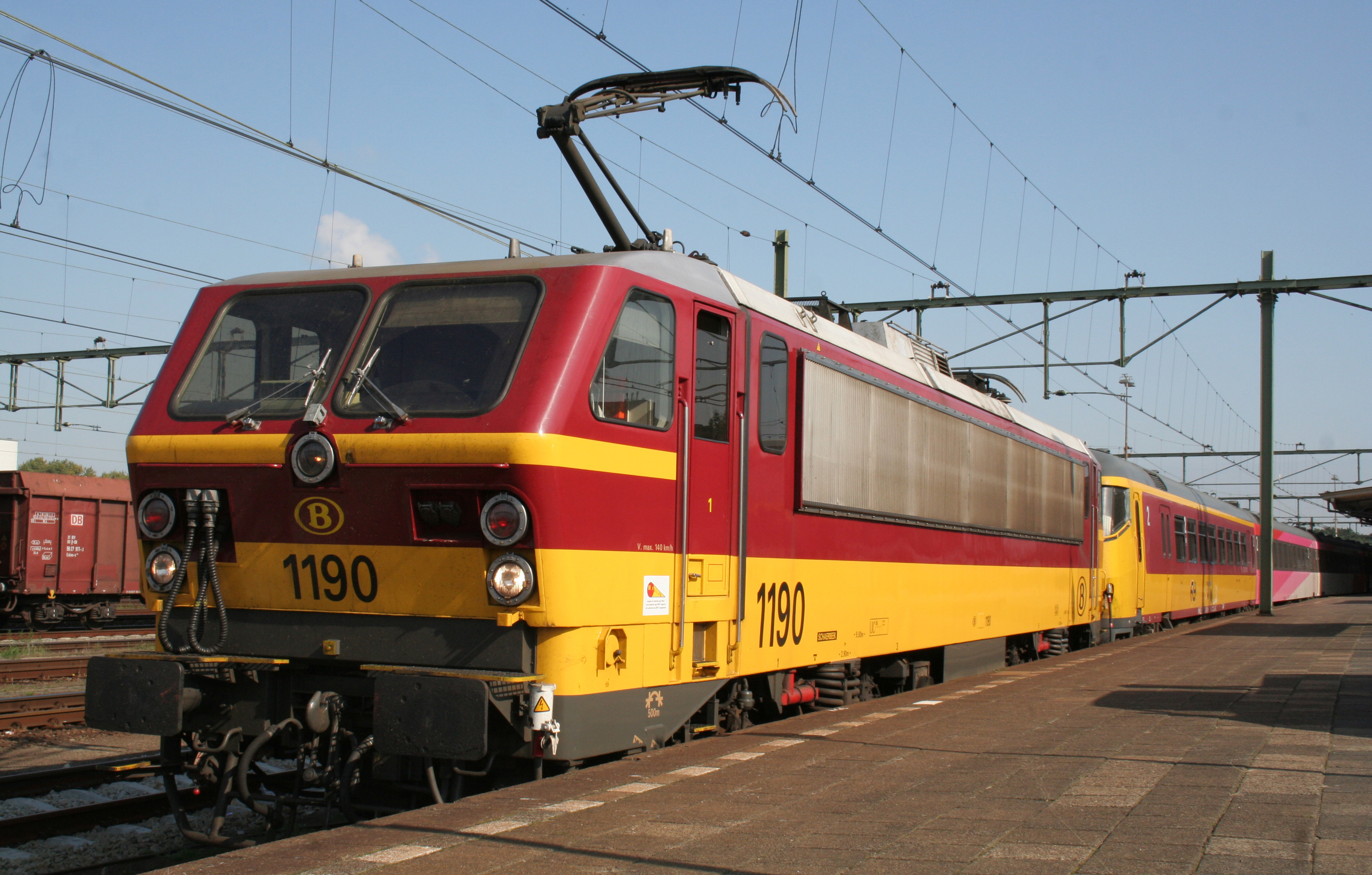
The old Beneluxtrein.

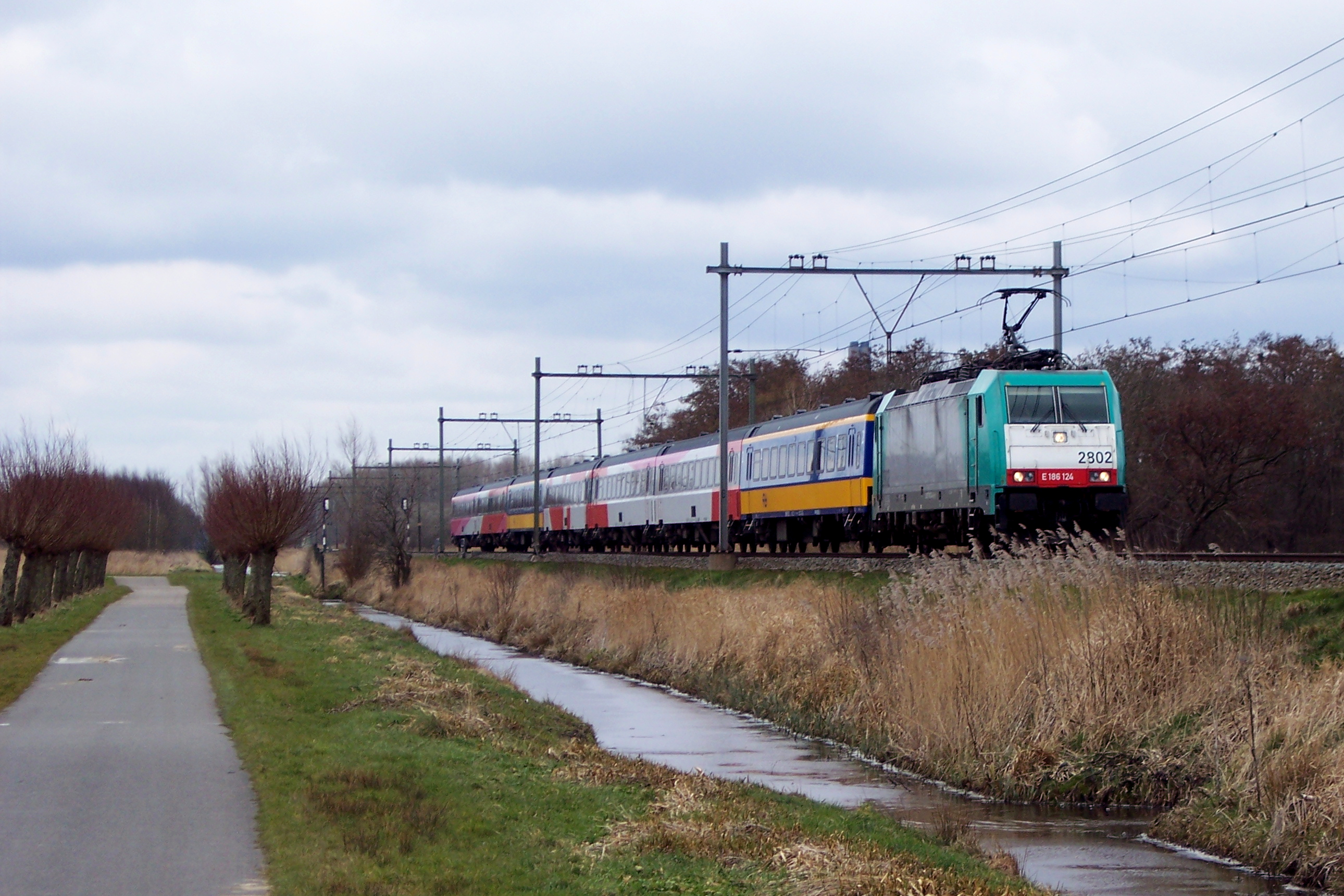
The temporary intercity train between The Hague and Brussels

The hourly Beneluxtrein ran between Brussels and The Hague (and on to Amsterdam) until 8 December 2012. After a period of chaos during which passengers had no option but to use the expensive Thalys or the ancient and unreliable stopping train from Antwerp to Roosendaal, a temporary intercity Brussels–The Hague service was re-established on 16 February 2013.

The Dutch Competition Authority accepted and published the plans on 27 February 2013, in order to give the existing concessionaires, concession grantors and administrator the opportunity to establish the objective of the proposal and whether it threatened the existing concessionaire's (the NS's) ‘economic balance’.

== Feasibility ==
The launch of the service depended not only on the outcome of the feasibility studies, but also on the resolution of the following issues:

- agreement with the Netherlands and Belgium (this is basically not needed because international rail travel is a free market, but there are limitations on the carrying of domestic travellers to protect the national railway concessions)
- the permits required
- legal and administrative procedures
- planning procedures of ProRail and Infrabel
- the appointment of an operator, after going to tender and resolving any appeals
- the purchase or lease of adequate trains
- the appointment and training of crew

The outcome of this process was that the service was not launched. Eventually the hourly Brussels-Amsterdam service via the Hague HS was restarted; it connects in Rotterdam with the high-speed Intercity Direct service to Amsterdam bypassing The Hague.
