= Belgian Railways =

Belgian Railways may refer to:

- Rail transport in Belgium
- National Railway Company of Belgium (SNCB/NMBS) (est. 1926), the national railway operator of Belgium
- Belgian State Railway (1834–1926), national railway operator, predecessor of SNCB/NMBS
- Infrabel, the national railway infrastructure company of Belgium
