= Vossloh G2000 BB =

Diesel-hydraulic locomotive

Vossloh G 2000 BB
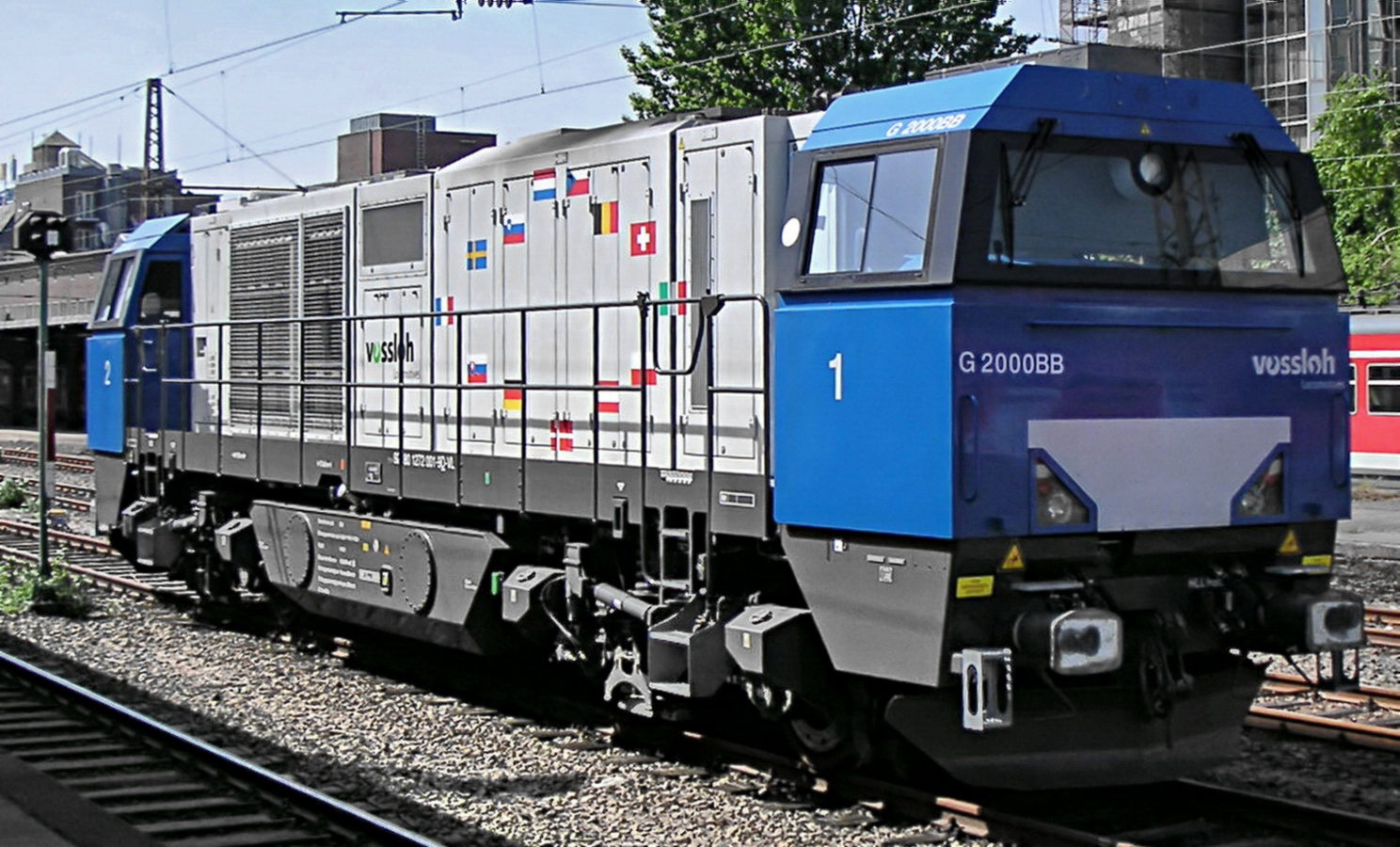
- A later version of the Vossloh G 2000 with the symmetric full width cab
Type and origin
- Power type: Diesel-hydraulic
- Builder: Vossloh
- Build date: G2000: 2000–2003; G2000-2: 2003; G2000-3: 2003; G2000-4: 2004; G2000-5: 2005
- Total produced: G2000: 20; G2000-2: 30; G2000-3: 16; G2000-4: 1 G2000-5: 1
Specifications
- Configuration
  - UIC: B′B′
- Gauge: 1,435 mm (4 ft 8 1/2 in) standard gauge
- Wheel diameter: 1,000 mm (39.37 in) / 920 mm (36.22 in) new/worn
- Length: 17.4 m (57 ft 1 in)
- Width: 3.08 m (10 ft 1 1/4 in)
- Height: G2000, G2000-2, G2000-3: 4.22 m (13 ft 10 1/8 in); G2000-4, G2000-5: 4.25 m (13 ft 11 3/8 in)
- Loco weight: G2000, G2000-2, G2000-3: 87.3 t (85.9 long tons; 96.2 short tons); G2000-4, G2000-5: 90 t (89 long tons; 99 short tons)
- Fuel type: Diesel fuel
- Fuel capacity: 5,000 L (1,100 imp gal; 1,300 US gal)
- Prime mover: G2000, G2000-2, G2000-3: Caterpillar 3516 B-HD; G2000-4, G2000-5: MTU 20V 4000 R42
- Transmission: Diesel-hydraulic: Voith L620reU2 (with KB 385 retarder for MTU engined variants)
- Loco brake: Air, Hydrodynamic brake
- Train brakes: Air
- Safety systems: ETCS
Performance figures
- Maximum speed: 120 km/h (75 mph)
- Power output: G2000, G2000-2, G2000-3: 2,240 kW (3,000 hp); G 2000-4, G2000-5: 2,700 kW (3,600 hp)
- Tractive effort: G2000, G2000-2, G2000-3: 282 kN (63,000 lb_{f}) at μ=0.33 (mass=87.3 t (85.9 long tons; 96.2 short tons)); G2000-4, G2000-5 :292 kN (66,000 lb_{f}) at μ=0.33 (mass=90 t (89 long tons; 99 short tons))
Career
- Locale: Germany, Switzerland, Italy, Netherlands, Belgium, France, Sweden, Denmark, Poland, Mexico

The G 2000 BB is a four axle heavy shunting and mainline locomotive, designed by German company Vossloh and built at the former MaK plant in Kiel. At the time of its introduction in 2000 it was the most powerful hydraulic transmission locomotive in Vossloh's range.

== History and design ==
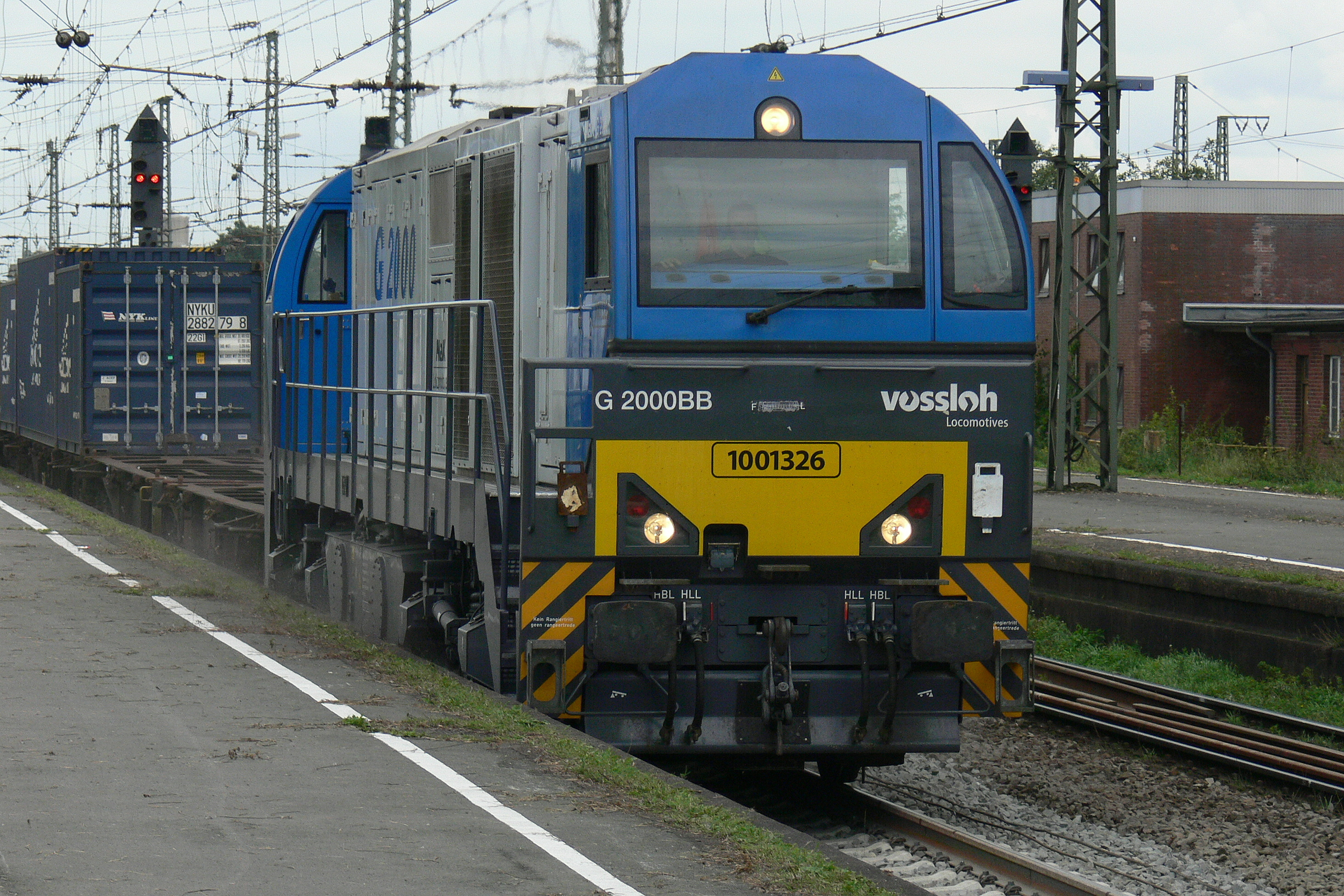
The asymmetric cab allows an external viewpoint at the front of the locomotive

The locomotive was unveiled at Innotrans in 2000. The initial model had an asymmetric cab (see image) with a walkway; the asymmetric cab design allows the walkway to extend all the way to each end of the locomotive; coupled with remote control operation this means that shunting can be done from an external viewpoint whilst still riding on the locomotive.

The design is modular with various components (engine, drive etc.) coming from different suppliers. External styling was by Tricon-Design.

A second variant was produced, this time with a symmetrical cab; two different versions of this model were produced - one for the Italian market (G 2000-2 BB) with left hand drive (trains in Italy generally keep to the left) and another (G 2000-3 BB) with right hand drive for Germany. The new cabs had seating for two operators, in other respects apart from the cab these two models are identical to the initial asymmetric offering.

Starting in 2004, two further sub designs were made: G 2000-4 BB with a MTU engine which increase the power to 2700 kW. This variant also included a hydrodynamic retarder (a type of braking system) as part of the Voith supplied transmission package.

The last variant is G 2000-5 BB which has the same upgrades as the fourth offering, it is designed for the Scandinavian market and as such has anti wheel slip technology, and can be equipped for service down to −40 °C (−40 °F).

== Operators and use ==
The locomotives are certified for use on the railways of Germany, Switzerland, Italy, Netherlands, Belgium, France, Sweden, Denmark and Poland.

The locomotives are operated by many companies, many of them on lease. Angel Trains and MRCE both act as leasing companies, with Angel Trains providing the vast majority of the leased locomotives. Other owners include Azienda Consorziale Trasporti (ACT) and SBB Cargo (as class SBB Am 840)

The machines find use in northern Italy and in the German Ruhr region as well as being used for cross border traffic in the Benelux region. Railion, Euro Cargo Rail, Rail4chem and others all use this locomotive. The locomotives are used for freight. In Italy, these are notably owned by TPER, which uses them in some of its cargo services under the operations of Dinazzano Po.

The Swedish rail company Hector Rail operates a G 2000-4 and a 2000-5 machine.

Additionally, in 2023, several G2000 units were exported to Mexico for use on the Tren Maya for construction work.

== See also ==
- List of Deutsche Bahn AG locomotives and railbuses

== Sources ==
- Detlef Eggers (2001), "Die Lokomotive G 2000 BB: Eine innovative dieselhydraulische Streckenlokomotive", Glasers Annalen (in German) (5): 173–182, ISSN 0941-0589
- "Магистральный тепловоз серии G 2000 BB с гидравлической передачей", Железные дороги мира (in Russian) (8), 2002, archived from the original on 2007-05-29
