= DB Cargo France =

French rail freight operator

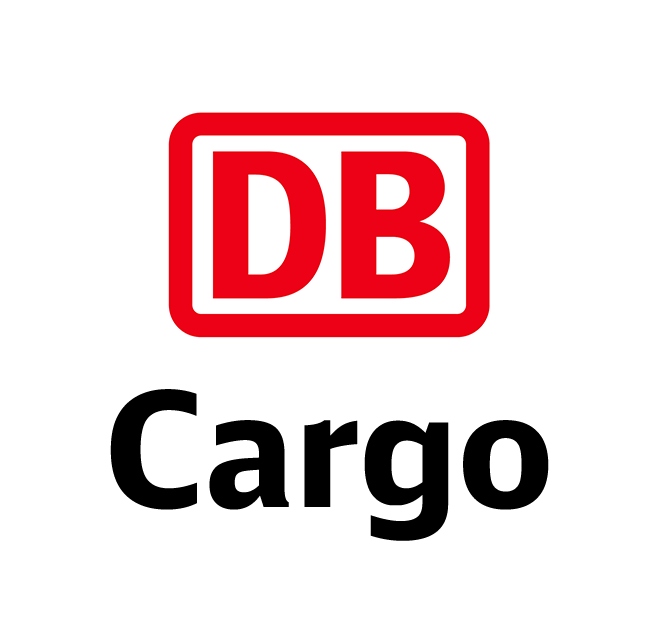

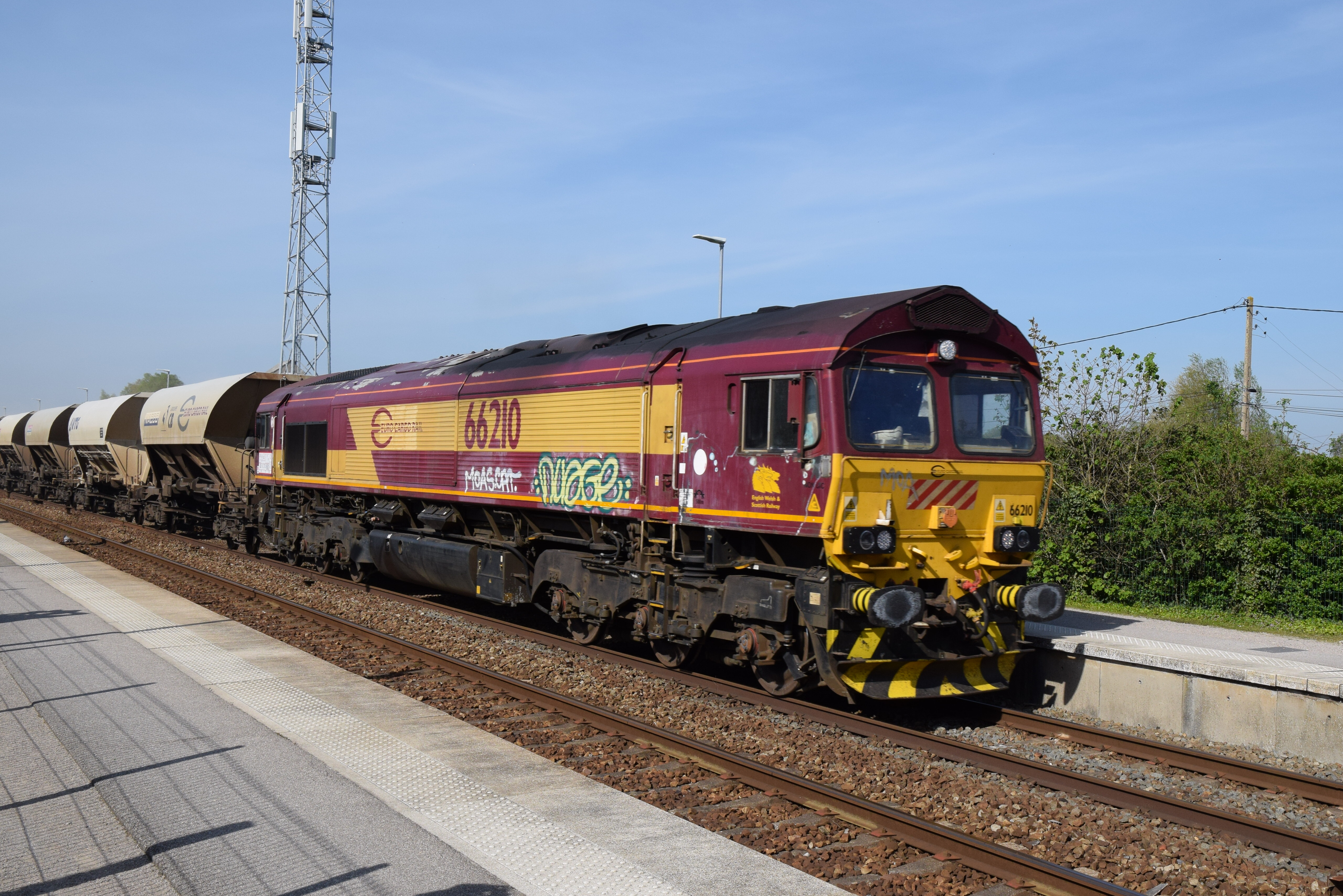
- Euro Cargo Rail Class 66
- Industry: freight rail transport
- Founded: 2005
- Headquarters: Paris, France
- Key people: Alexandre Gallo (CEO) 2021-
- Revenue: € 146 million (2018)
- Number of employees: 900 (2018)
- Parent: DB Cargo
- Website: fr.dbcargo.com

DB Cargo France is a French rail freight operator. It is presently a subsidiary of the German state-owned logistics company DB Cargo.

DB Cargo France was originally established as Euro Cargo Rail (ECR) in early 2005 by the British freight company English Welsh & Scottish Railway (EWS). The company had sought to expand its footprint in the continental European rail freight market; while one of its subsidiaries, EWS International, operated the trains, ECR was responsible for marketing and trading duties. EWS's application to operate open-access freight services in France was approved in November 2005, permitting the commencement of services in May 2006. Initially, operations were focused upon France's northern region and its borderlands; however, ECR had grand ambitions to expand across Europe, filing applications to operate in both Belgium and Germany during 2006.

During June 2007, EWS and ECR were both acquired by the German state railway company Deutsche Bahn (DB). By the following year, ECR had become the second largest rail freight company in France, after the traditional market leading state-owned operator SNCF. During October 2010, ECR formed a joint venture with the Port of La Rochelle, named OFP La Rochelle; seven years later, ECR sold its stake in the venture. While early rolling stock was typically leased, or transferred from EWS, the company was quickly able to place its own sizable orders for new-build locomotives, such as the TRAXX F140 MS and the EMD Series 66, although many of these deliveries would be received by DB Cargo rather than ECR itself. During May 2017, DB invested $150 million to recapitalise and restructure the company, resulting in the loss of one quarter of its staff. In late 2021, the company was rebranded as DB Cargo France.

== History ==
During January 2005, it was announced that English Welsh & Scottish Railway (EWS) had lodged an application for an operating licence to operate open-access freight services in France. At the time, EWS International, a subsidiary of EWS focused on continental European operations, was intended to actually operate the trains, while a newly created entity, Euro Cargo Rail (ECR), was established to perform the marketing and trading of these rail services. It was envisaged that initial operations would be focused upon northern France, specifically on those routes that ran close to or across the national borders of France. Furthermore, the company promoted itself as working to increase the amount of rail freight within France by pursuing operations that would be economically viable in comparison to road transportation.

In November 2005, EWS' application was approved and a safety certificate was granted by the French Minister for Transport; this outcome meant that ECR had become only the third freight operator in the country at that time. At the time, the commencement of freight services had been anticipated to occur sometime in that same winter. In actuality, ECR would not run any services until May 2006. In July 2006, it was announced that ECR had, as part of its ambitions to expand across western Europe, filed applications to operate freight services in neighbouring Belgium and Germany.

On 28 June 2007, EWS was wholly acquired by the German state railway company Deutsche Bahn (DB) in a deal that included ECR. On 7 November 2007, the European Commission (EC) issued its conditional approval of DB's takeover of EWS and ECR.

By 2008, ECR had become the second largest rail freight company in France, after the traditional market leading state-owned operator SNCF, holding a 5.3% market share. By 2010, the company's market share was estimated to have increased to 8%. That same year, a major dispute between DB and SNCF over access to France's railways had escalated to the level of government ministers in both countries intervening. Two years prior, ECR had been denied the train paths needed to operate aggregates trains on behalf of Lafarge on account of SNCF having booked all of the available paths. In December 2012, SNCF was fined €60.9m for exercising anti-competitive measures that sought to block open-access operators from using certain resources, such as renting wagons or using train paths, thus forcing them to use less optimal alternatives or to not run certain services at all.

During the summer of 2010, ECR became involved in the new French freight company OFP La Rochelle, which was structured as a joint venture between the company and the Port of La Rochelle. ECR held a 24.9% minority stake, while the port authorities held a 75.1% majority stake. In May 2017, it was announced that ECR had sold its stake in the venture, which continued to operate using new partners.

Starting in 2010, ECR participated in the Sustainable Iron and Steel Transport by European Railways project, which provided a door-to-door logistics service via two multi-client services ran per week between Turin, Italy and Sagunto, Spain, along with another two trains between Monza and Irun, via a newly opened cross-border link between Figueras and Perpignan. Specifically, ECR operated these freight trains while they were traversing the French rail network.

During May 2017, following ECR's recorded loss of €25.5 million, DB Cargo invested €150 million into the business with the aim of recapitalising and stabilising the company's operations within the space of one year; other measures were taken, including a restructuring that led to the loss of 300 jobs, which was roughly one quarter of ECR's workforce.

In June 2020, the company became a member of a new coalition of organisations across France’s rail freight sector, French Rail Freight of the Future, which sought to double the volume of rail freight in the nation by 2030. During late 2021, ECR was rebranded as DB Cargo France, bringing its identity into line with that of its corporate parent.

== Rolling stock ==
ECR's initial operations were carried out using a small leased fleet of four Vossloh G1206 diesel locomotives; the maintenance of these locomotives was carried out at EWS's Dollands Moor Freight Yard in England, thus the locomotives were given a TOPS classification number, Class 21.

Between 2007 and 2009, the company also acquired several Vossloh G1000 BB locomotives, and briefly leased three TRAXX F140 AC locomotives from Mitsui Rail Capital (MRCE) during 2007 these were returned to the leaser in August 2008.

Vossloh G2000 in 2008

In 2008-2009, ECR also opted to lease around ten Vossloh G2000 locomotives and five Vossloh Euro 4000 locomotives (1668mm gauge) from Angel Trains Cargo.

During 2008, a pair of TRAXX F140 MS locomotives operating in ECR livery were used for homologation of the type in France and Belgium; type certification was obtained in July 2009. The two locomotives formed part of an order of 20 units delivery between 2009 and 2010. In 2009, an additional 45 units were ordered, which were divided between DB Schenker (25 units) and ECR (20 units); these were delivered from 2010 onwards.

In January 2006, the first Class 66 was transferred from EWS to ECR; by November 2007, fifty locomotives had been transferred. During late 2007, the first of an order for 60 new EMD Series 66 locomotives were delivered. as the Class 77 from 77001 to 77060. However, only half of the order was ultimately delivered to ECR, while the balance was instead delivered to the parent company DB Cargo in Germany. Furthermore, all of ECR's Class 66s were gradually transferred to Germany, the last five locomotives being transferred during 2019.

SNCF Y8000 in 2011

In April 2009, a pair of Class 08 shunters were sent to France from England.

Starting in 2010, the company began leasing Alstom Prima electric locomotives (sub types BB 27000, and BB 37000 dual and triple voltage) from Akiem. The company also began hiring SNCF Y8000 type shunters from Akiem in the same year.

Alstom Prima (DB Cargo France) in 2024

By 2018, ECR reportedly operated 151 locomotives.

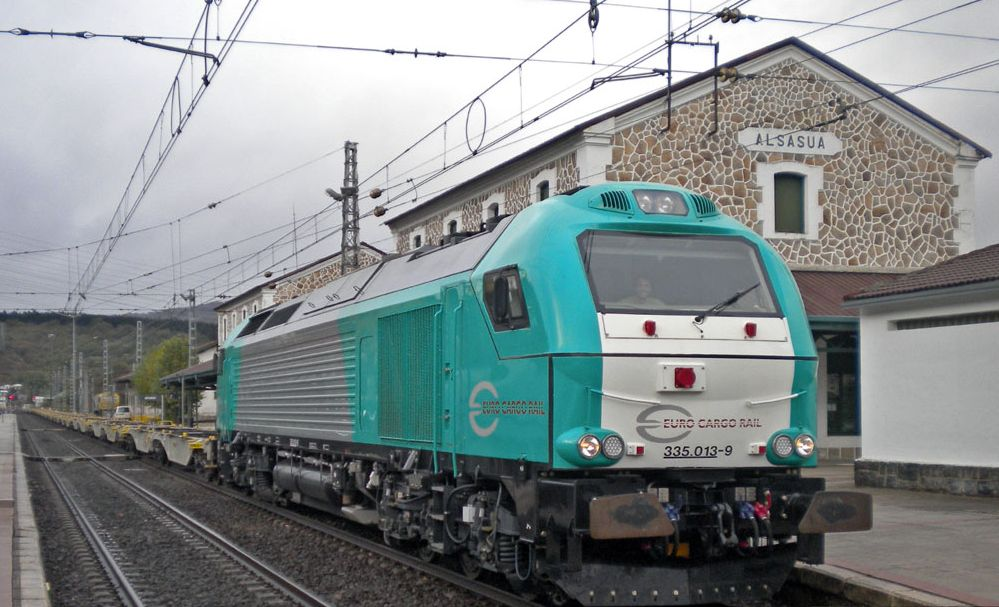
Euro 4000 in Alsasua, Spain (2009)

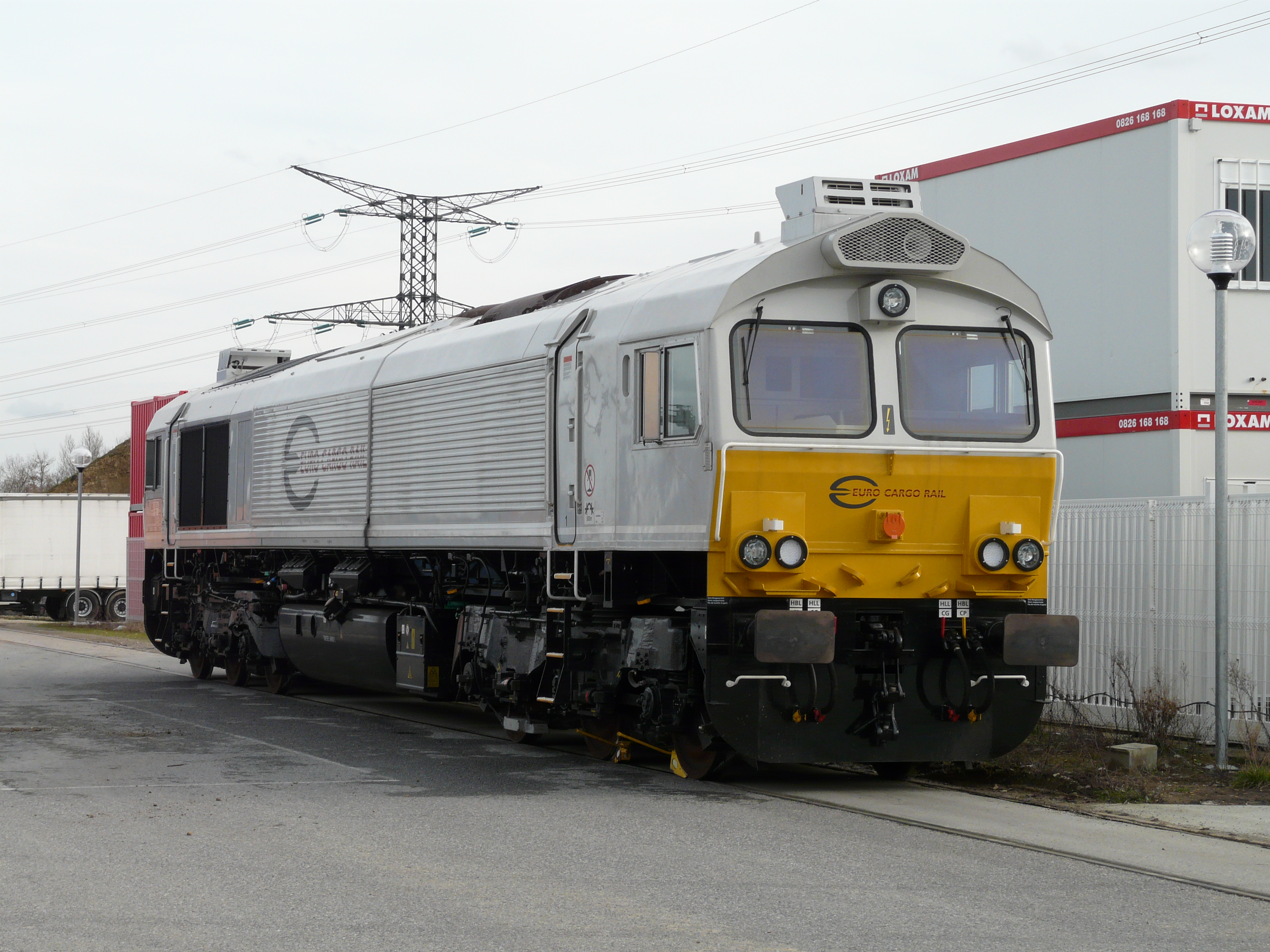
ECR Class 77 (2009)

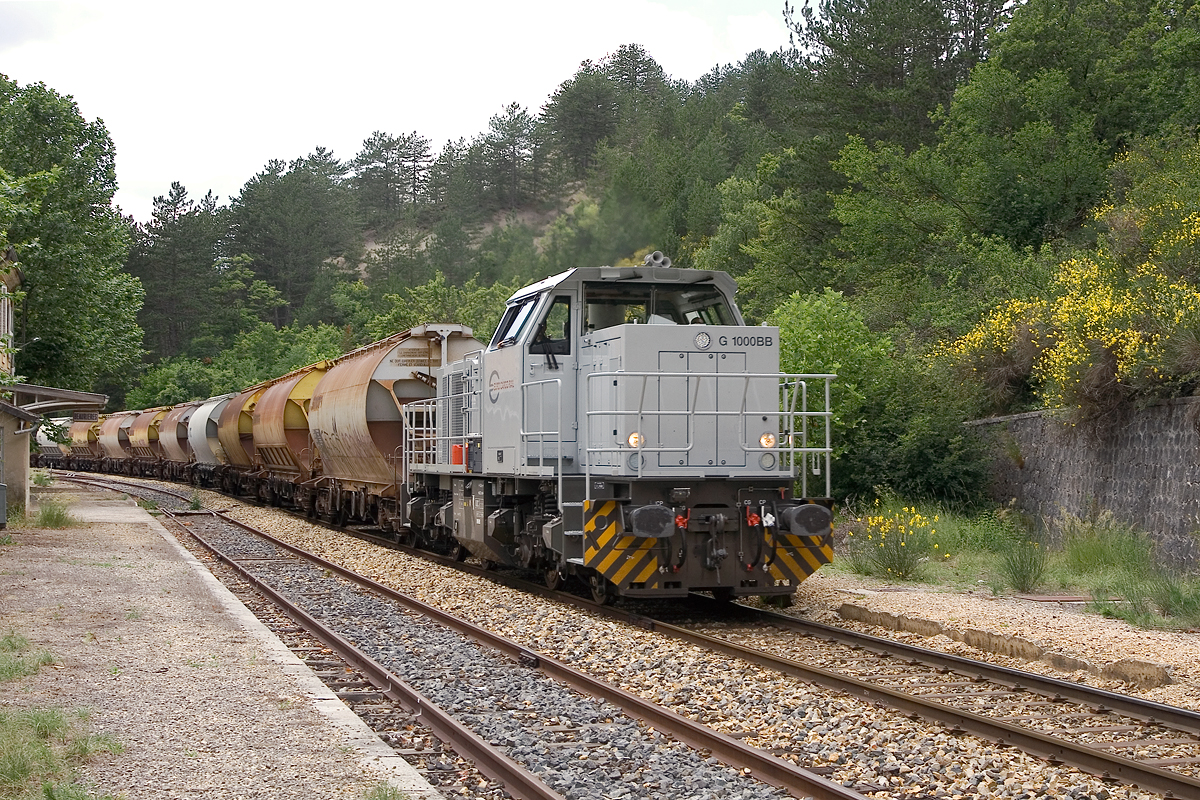
Vossloh G1000 with ECR gypsum train at Beaurières station (2008)

TRAXX F140 MS locomotive in Zwankendamme near Zeebrugge, Belgium (2015)

== See also ==
- Europorte
- SNCF Logistics
- Captrain France
