= Infrabel =

Belgian public limited company owned by the government

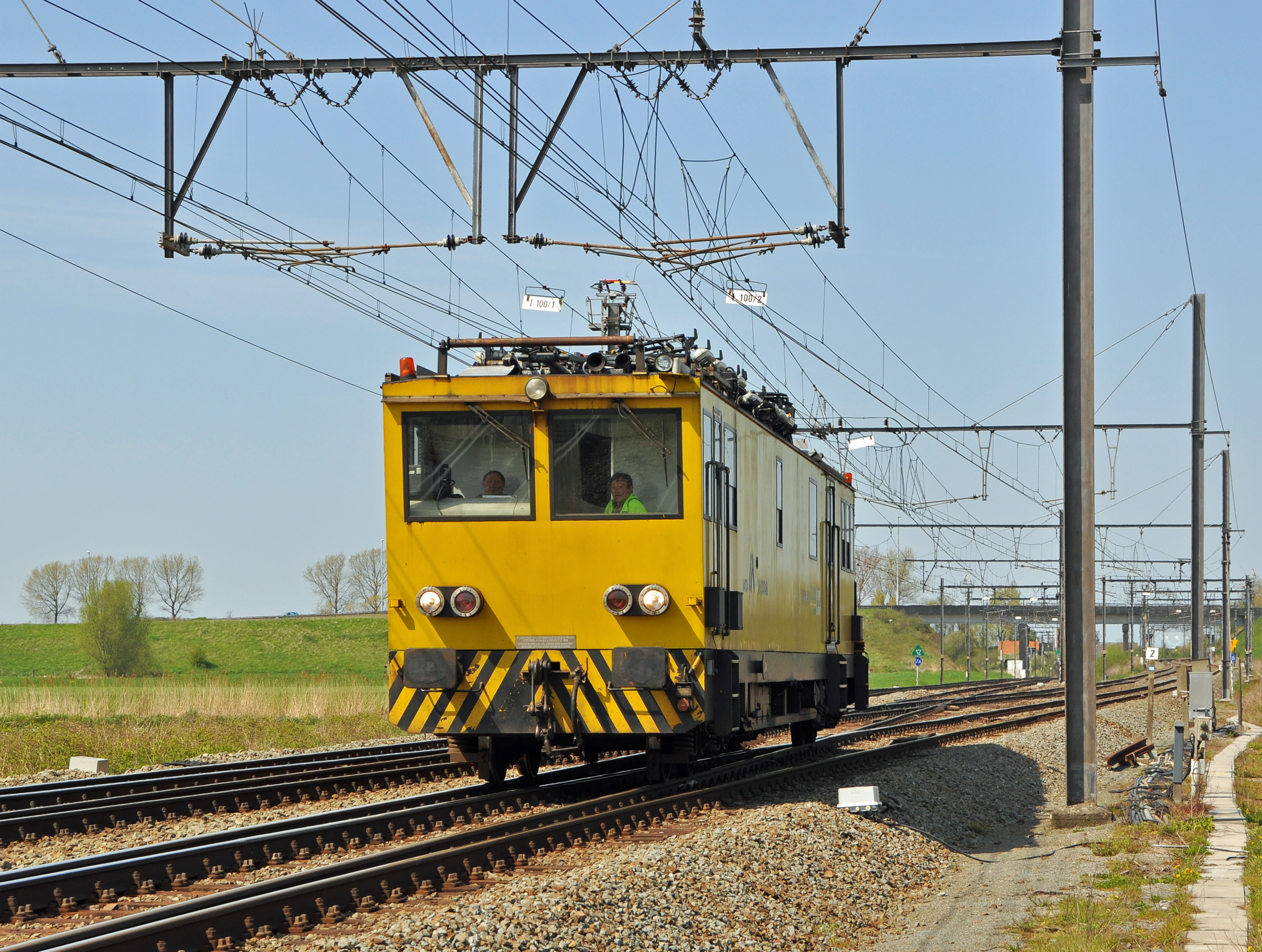
- Company type: State-owned enterprise
- Industry: Railroad
- Predecessor: SNCB
- Founded: 2005
- Headquarters: Brussels, Belgium
- Key people: Benoît Gilson
- Products: Railway Infrastructure
- Revenue: € 1.309 billion (2009)
- Operating income: € -252.16 million (2009)
- Net income: € 69.61 million (2009)
- Total assets: € 13.834 billion (2009)
- Number of employees: 12,875 (2009)
- Parent: SNCB-Holding (until 2013), state of Belgium
- Divisions: Infrastructure, network, network access
- Subsidiaries: TUC Rail, Brussels Creosote Centre
- Website: www.infrabel.be

Infrabel is a Belgian government-owned public limited company. It builds, owns, maintains and upgrades the Belgian railway network, makes its capacity available to railway operator companies, and handles train traffic control. The stations are still owned by SNCB/NMBS.

Infrabel was created on 1 January 2005 from the split of the once unitary National Railway Company of Belgium (SNCB/NMBS). By 31 December 2009, it had 12,875 employees, while the CEO was Benoît Gilson, who succeeded the long-serving Luc Lallemand in that role in 2020. Between its creation in 2005 up until 31 December 2013, 93.6% of stock was owned by SNCB-Holding, representing 20% of the voting rights minus one vote; the remainder, 80% of the voting rights (+ one vote) and 6.4% of stock had been controlled directly by the Belgian state, represented by the minister of the Civil Service and is a Public Companies and by the State Secretary for Mobility. EBITDA for fiscal year 2009 amounted to €55.01 million, EBT to €69.61 million. The balance sheet total as of 31 December 2009 was €13.8 billion.

By 31 December 2009, Infrabel oversaw 3,578 kilometres (2,223 mi) of railway lines, 12,218 switches, 1,913 level crossings (partly the road-side signalling), 223 railway signalling cabins, one traffic control centre, four workshops, 7,163 railway structures, and 339 unstaffed stops. Of the 11 railway undertakings certified to operation on the Belgian railway network, six customers effectively drove trains during 2009: National Railway Company of Belgium (SNCB), Crossrail Benelux, Veolia Cargo Nederland BV, SNCF Fret, TrainsporT AG and ERS Railways BV. In the following year, 492 freight and 4,132 passenger train paths per day were delivered by Infrabel. Since 1 January 2014, Infrabel has been an Autonomous Public Company and is no longer owned by SNCB-Holding. The company has two direct subsidiaries: TUC Rail NV/SA and the Brussels Creosote Centre (Creosoteer Centrum Van Brussel/Chantier de Creosotage de Bruxelles NV/SA). Additionally, Infrabel is a partner in the EuroCarex high-speed railway freight project.

== History ==
During the early to mid 2000s, the National Railway Company of Belgium (SNCB/NMBS) was substantially reorganised, partially in order to comply with relevant legislation set out by the European Union; the railway infrastructure management company Infrabel was created in January 2005 as one of several new railway companies established at this time. SNCB continued to exist as an operator of both passenger and freight trains upon the Belgian railway network, while Infrabel took on the construction, modernisation, maintenance, traffic management, and safe operation of the Belgium rail infrastructure. In addition to regular operations, the new entity was quick to involve itself in multiple public–private partnerships to bring about a variety of improvements. One early focus area for investment by Infrabel was the various ports across Belgium, such works were largely focused on electrification, new signalling systems, and the installation of additional tracks to better facilitate intermodal freight movements.

Between 2005 and 2007, the organisation's first two years of operations, Infrabel allocated 27 per cent of its €3.314 billion investment budget into maintenance activities, while 20 per cent was expended on infrastructure expansion. Modernisation efforts at this time included the renovation of existing signal boxes as well as ten separate major projects primarily aimed at capacity expansion. During late 2006, a new communication centre for Belgium's railways, simply referred to as Traffic Control, came into operation, integrating the former national and regional dispatching centres to guide trains through all lines of the Belgian rail network in real time; this involved the phased replacement of aging electromechanical apparatus with computer-controlled EBP-PLP (Elektronische Bedieningspost – Poste à Logique programmée) counterparts that has allowed for a drastic reduction in the number of signal boxes required, from 368 to 31 modern control centres.

In 2010, Infrabel CEO Luc Lallemand publicly voiced his support of new railway operations legislation produced by the European Commission that, amongst other aspects, sought to protect and bolster the independence of rail infrastructure companies from train operators, promote competitiveness, and address insufficient implementation of existing directives. Around this time, the company was stating its corporate strategy to be client-focused and looking towards an increasingly liberalised European railway market; specifically, that its investment in capacity expansion was typically targeted towards areas that clients sought to run additional services. By 2011, international passenger operators on the Belgian railway network included Eurostar, Thalys, and ICE, the latter being operated under licence from SNCB; furthermore, in excess of 200 private companies were using the network to move freight, much of which was going between major logistical hubs at ports.

One of Infrabel's earliest investment programmes was the Diabolo project, which involved the construction of a direct underground rail link to Brussels Airport. Started in September 2007, the new line, which was built by the private public partnership company Northern Diabolo NV, was completed in June 2012 at a reported cost of €540 million; the most challenging component of the project was the boring of two tunnel shafts over a distance of 1.07 kilometres (0.66 mi) while only 6.5 metres (21 ft) beneath surface level. Another multi-step project was conducted on behalf of the port of Antwerp; initially, €100 million was invested in expanding capacity and the building of 153 kilometres (95 mi) of additional tracks on the left bank of Antwerp. The centrepiece of this work was building a direct rail connection between the left and right banks via a pair of 16.2 kilometres (10.1 mi) single-track bores underneath the river, referred to as the Liefkenshoek connection. During January 2010, boring work commenced on the first of the two tunnels. On 9 December 2014, the completed link was officially opened. Separately, Infrabel also launched safety initiatives focused on the port of Antwerp, noting the high level of accidents involving heavy goods vehicles at level crossings.

During the late 2000s and 2010s, Infrabel undertook the necessary infrastructure work to facilitate the commencement of the Brussels Regional Express Network, a new suburban commuter rail service serving the capital; the project was financed via a separate budget to Infrabel's regular activities. Infrabel was also responsible for delivering the HSL 4 high-speed rail line running between Brussels and the country's northern border with the Netherlands to connect with HSL-Zuid, permitting international high speed train services to be operated between the two countries.

Throughout the 2010s, multiple broad programmes aimed at modernising railway infrastructure were enacted. Specifically, Belgium's overhead electrification, covering 3,024 kilometres (1,879 mi) (roughly 85 per cent) of the 3,592 kilometres (2,232 mi) of rail lines in the Belgian network, was progressive modernised, standardised, and (in some places) converted from 3kV direct current to 25kV (25,000 Volt) alternating current. Infrabel has also been deploying the European Train Control System (ETCS) along strategic corridors, replacing obsolete and less effective signalling apparatus in the process; in August 2015, a €510 million contract to install such equipment along 2,200 kilometres (1,400 mi) of track was issued to Siemens and Cofely-Fabricom. by 2016, the 429 kilometres (267 mi) Antwerp–Athus route has been fully converted, in the process commissioning the longest ETCS railway line on a conventional rail line in Europe. In 2016, it was announced that two additional tracks would be built to expand the capacity of the Brussels–Denderleeuw line, which was the busiest route in Belgium. Furthermore, where reasonable to do so, Infrabel has also been eliminating level crossings, often by building new roads, bridges, or tunnels, with the twin aims of reducing accident rates and improving punctuality.

== See also ==
- Belgian Railways (disambiguation)
- List of railway lines in Belgium
- National Railway Company of Belgium (NMBS/SNCB)
