= EMD Class 66 =

Co-Co diesel locomotive

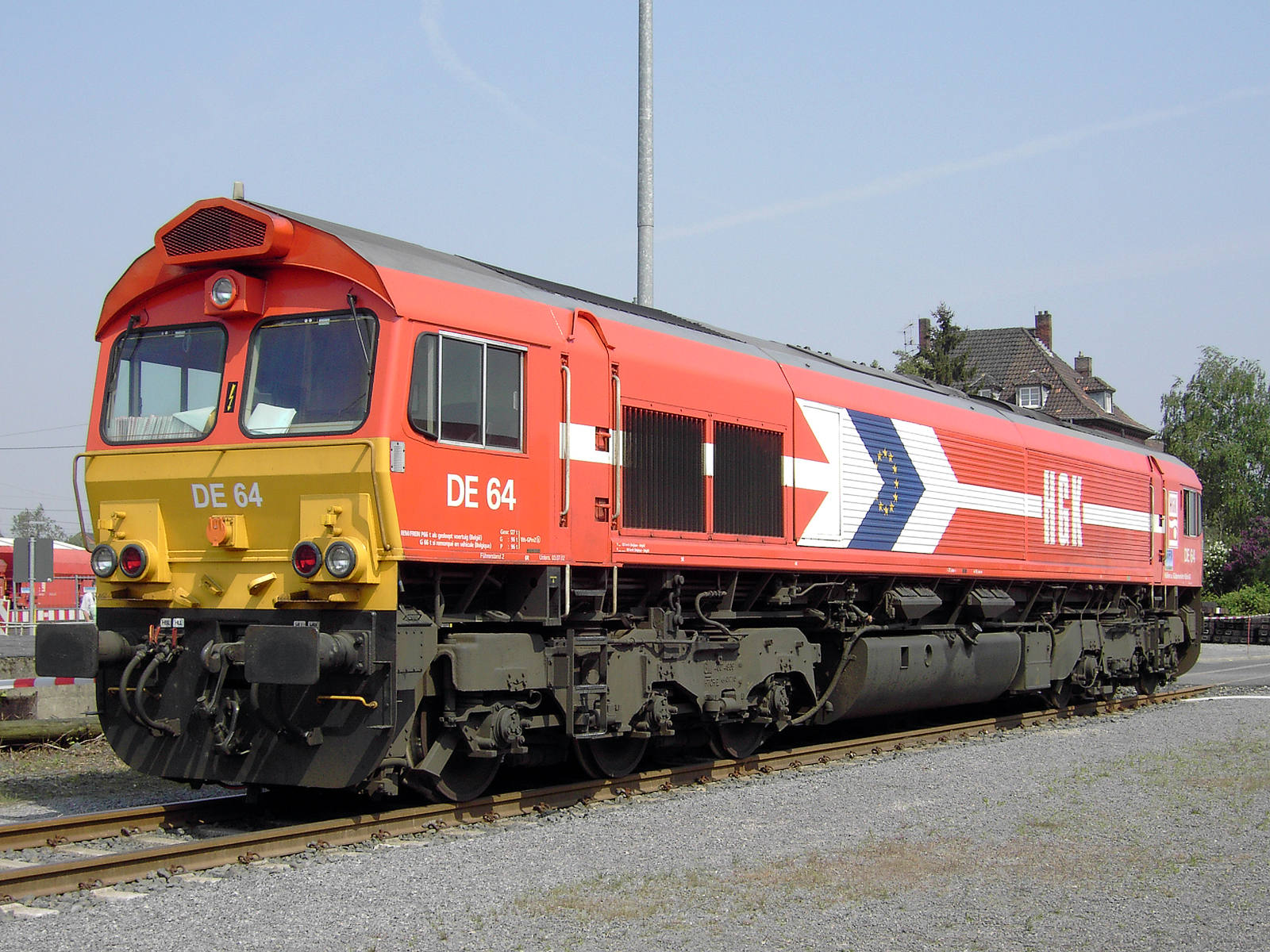
- HGK DE 64 at Godorf Hafen open day.
Type and origin
- Power type: Diesel-electric
- Builder: Electro-Motive Diesel
- Model: EMD JT42CWRM
- Build date: 1998-present
- Total produced: 651+(7)
Specifications
- Configuration
  - UIC: Co′Co′
- Gauge: 1,435 mm (4 ft 8 1/2 in) standard gauge
- Bogies: HTCR-E
- Length: 21.35 m (70 ft 1 in)
- Width: 2.64 m (8 ft 8 in)
- Height: 3.9 m (12 ft 10 in)
- Loco weight: 126.9 t (124.9 long tons; 139.9 short tons)
- Fuel type: Diesel
- Fuel capacity: 6,400 L (1,400 imp gal; 1,700 US gal)
- Prime mover: EMD 12N-710G3B-T2, 2,420 kW
- Engine type: V12 Two-stroke diesel
- Alternator: Main: General Motors AR8PHEH; Aux.: General Motors CA6B
- Traction motors: General Motors D43TR Axle Hung (6x)
- Cylinders: 12
- Transmission: Electric
- Loco brake: Air
Performance figures
- Power output: 2,420 kW (3,250 hp) (total); 2,268 kW (3,041 hp) (traction)
- Tractive effort: Starting: 409 kN (92,000 lb_{f}) except Freightliner 66/6: 467 kN (105,000 lb_{f}); Continuous: 260 kN (58,000 lb_{f}) @ 25.6 km/h (15.9 mph) except for Freightliner 66/6: 296 kN (67,000 lb_{f}) @ 22.5 km/h (14.0 mph)
Career
- Nicknames: 'Klaas 66' (NL) (Note: Klass 66: a play on the English word "class" and the Dutch boys' name "Klaas" and the word SantaKlaus (Dutch:'Sinterklaas'). The nickname came about because the first engine delivered to the Netherlands (HGK DE61) was painted red, a colour normally associated with Santa.) 'Scheune' (DE)
- Locale: Western Europe, Egypt and Gabon

The Electro-Motive Diesel (EMD) Class 66 (EMD JT42CWR) are Co-Co diesel locomotives built by EMD for the European heavy freight market. Designed for use in Great Britain as the British Rail Class 66, a development of the Class 59, they have been adapted and certified for use in other European countries. Outside Europe, 40 locomotives have been sold to Egyptian Railways for passenger operation.

A number of locomotives built for Euro Cargo Rail in France with roof-mounted air conditioning are classed Class 77. In Germany ECR units operated for DB Schenker were numbered as class 247, re-classified as class 266 by the Eisenbahn-Bundesamt to match other Class 66 locomotives operating in Germany.

== History ==
=== United Kingdom ===
The class was designed by General Motors-Electro Motive Division (Note: In 2005 General Motors sold its locomotive manufacturing division (EMD), the organisation is now named Electro Motive Diesel or EMD) for use in the UK, and 250 were sold to English Welsh & Scottish, with orders from Direct Rail Services, Fastline, Freightliner and GB Railfreight.

=== Mainland Europe ===
With the locomotives proving successful in the UK, interest came from railway operators in continental Europe. General Motors locomotives in mainland Europe had historically been produced under license by local manufacturers. The high haulage capacity and reliability of the Class 59 (JT26-CW-SS) had led to its use by the German company Häfen und Güterverkehr Köln (HGK). The first mainland Europe order also came from HGK, for two locomotives, followed by TGOJ Trafik (Trafikaktiebolaget Grängesberg-Oxelösunds Järnvägar) in Sweden. Subsequently, many European railway operators bought locomotives.

==== Class 77 ====
With a high number of orders, EMD modified the locomotive for European ECR operations, including:

- Powered by a 12-cylinder 710 engine that meets EU Stage IIIA emissions regulations, via latest EM2000 control system
- DC traction motors, rated at 3,300 horsepower (2,500 kW)
- Enhanced gear case, which increases tractive effort to 450 kN (100,000 lb_{f}), making the locomotive suitable for heavier European trains
- ECR Train Protection System allowing for immediate certification for operation in France, Germany and Belgium, but meaning that they cannot operate in Great Britain
- Additional driver facilities, including cab air conditioning; a microwave and fridge in one cab; additional noise cancelling insulation; a modified seat

Designated JT42CWRM-100 by EMD and registered in France as Class 77, over 100 locomotives have been purchased including 60 by DB Schenker subsidiary Euro Cargo Rail.

==== Class 66EU ====
In 2008 EMD announced plans to develop a new variant 'Class 66EU' designed for continental European operations, built within the UIC 505-1 loading gauge as opposed to the restrictive UK loading gauge. A range of European safety systems would be supported including ERTMS, and locomotives would be fitted with a dynamic brake and previous issues with driver comfort were to be addressed. The project was confirmed to be cancelled in 2011. A similar locomotive concept using EMD technology is the Vossloh Euro 4000 and has been delivered to operators in several countries including Norway, France, Spain, Portugal and Israel.

== Technical ==
The locomotive uses standard EMD components - an EMD 710 prime mover, D43 traction motors, radial (Note: The individual bogies are articulated rather than having two bogies connected with a Beugniot lever or equivalent) (self-steering) bogies of patented design, which reduce wheel surface and flange wear and are said to improve adhesion and reduce track load.

The class has undergone updates; other than the lower-geared class 66/6 produced for Freightliner, most of the updates have been in relation to conforming to specifications for exhaust particulate emissions.

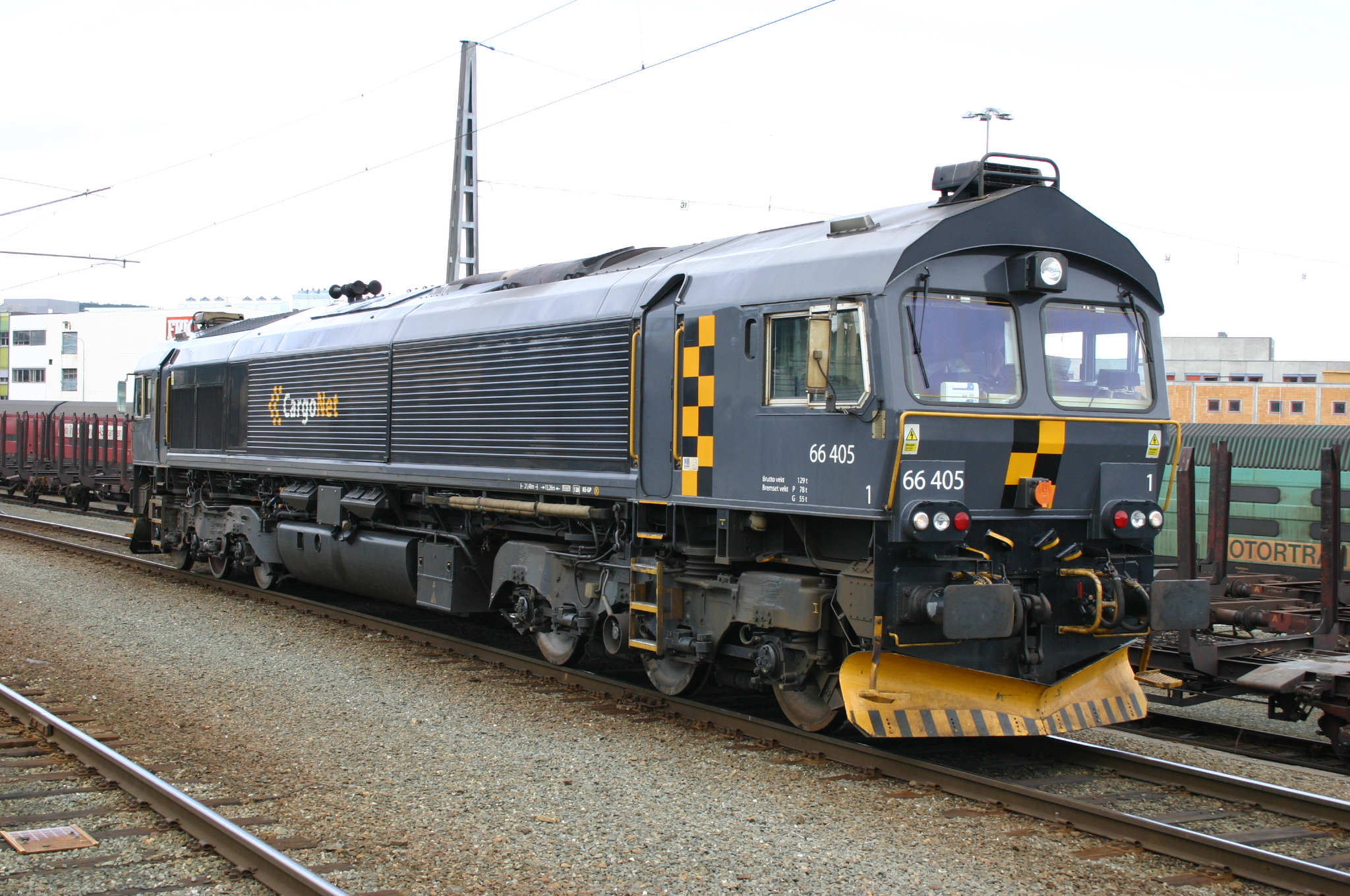
CD66 of CargoNet, the air conditioning unit is visible above the cab

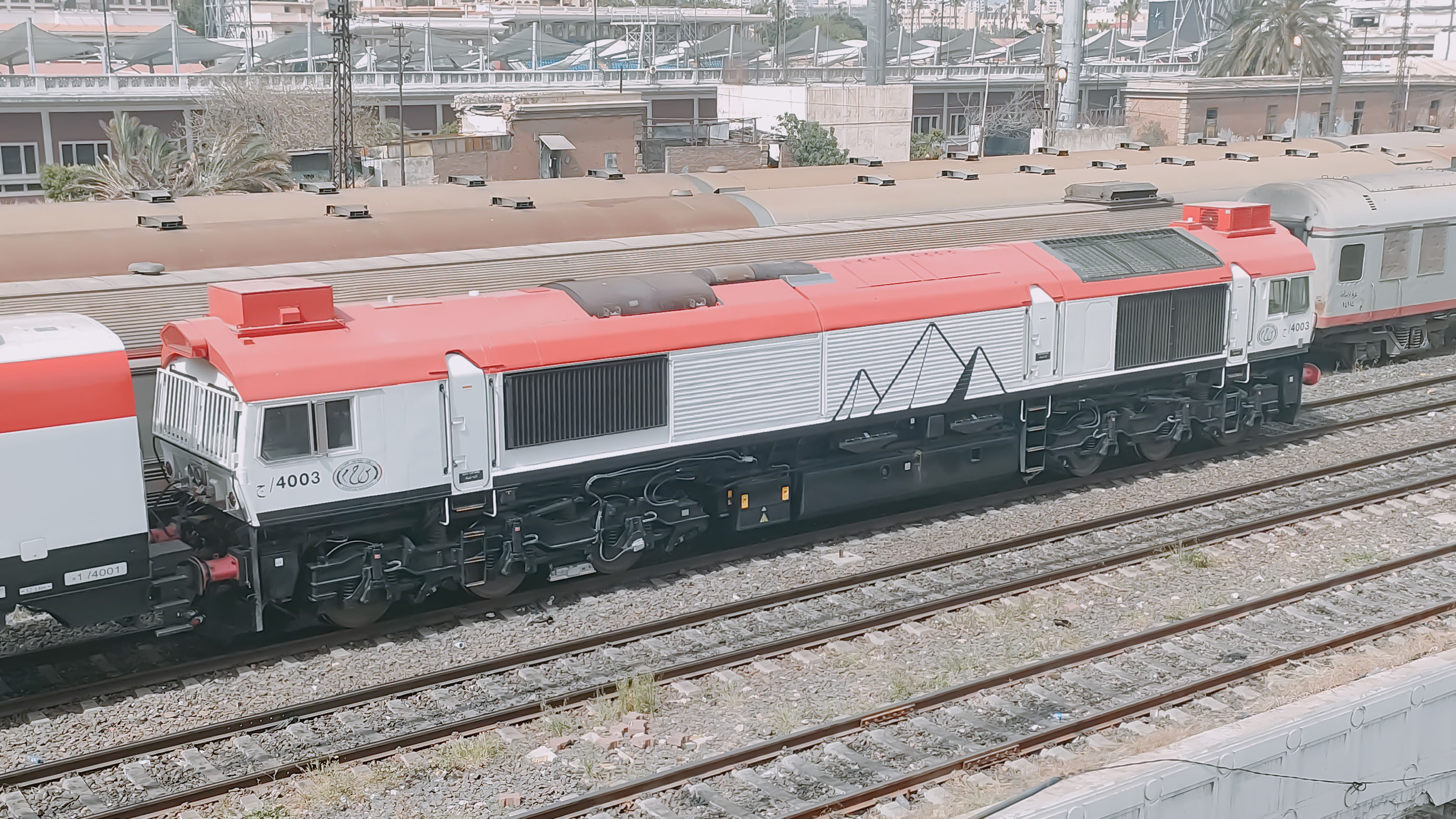
Egyptian Railways Class 66

Despite being popular with rail operators, especially due to its high reliability, the class has not been universally successful: one recurring problem has been driver comfort. In particular, noise levels (including noise from the cab horn), vibration, and excessive cab-temperatures in hot weather have brought serious complaints. The cab is not isolated from the main frame, causing engine noise to be the dominant background noise; notwithstanding the implications for safety (audibility of warning signals etc.), and the potential for hearing damage in the long term, the conditions drivers face led to threats of industrial action in the UK in 2007, and an agreement for increased pay for drivers using this type of locomotive (in Norway). By modifying using noise absorbing materials EMD succeeded in meeting TSI Noise Certification standards in 2008. Tests on retrofitted cooling systems and improved seating have been carried out on some UK locomotives.

=== ETCS Equipment ===
Between 2006 and 2010, 12 locomotives belonging to Mitsui Capital Rail Europe (MRCE), operating in the Netherlands and Germany, were equipped with ETCS, principally to allow them to work on the equipped Betuweroute, comprising the ETCS Level 1 "Havenspoorlijn" in the Rotterdam harbour area and the ETCS Level 2 "A15" route linking Rotterdam to the German border. (Note: Bombardier "EBICab2000" ETCS. Includes ATB-EG specific transmission module (STM) for conventional Dutch lines and the PZB STM for Germany. A separate "Memor" unit is installed for Belgian operation.). The MRCE locomotives were sold to Beacon Rail in 2015. Commencing in 2015, 15 locomotives owned by Ascendos Rail Leasing and 10 locomotives owned and operated by Crossrail Benelux were equipped with ETCS.

=== Idle reduction ===
As a fuel-saving and wear-reduction measure operator DB Schenker Rail UK is to fit ninety of its fleet with automatic engine stop start technology by the end of 2015. The modification is provided by ZTR Control Systems of London, Ontario and is expected to reduce engine running hours by about one-third.

== Operators ==
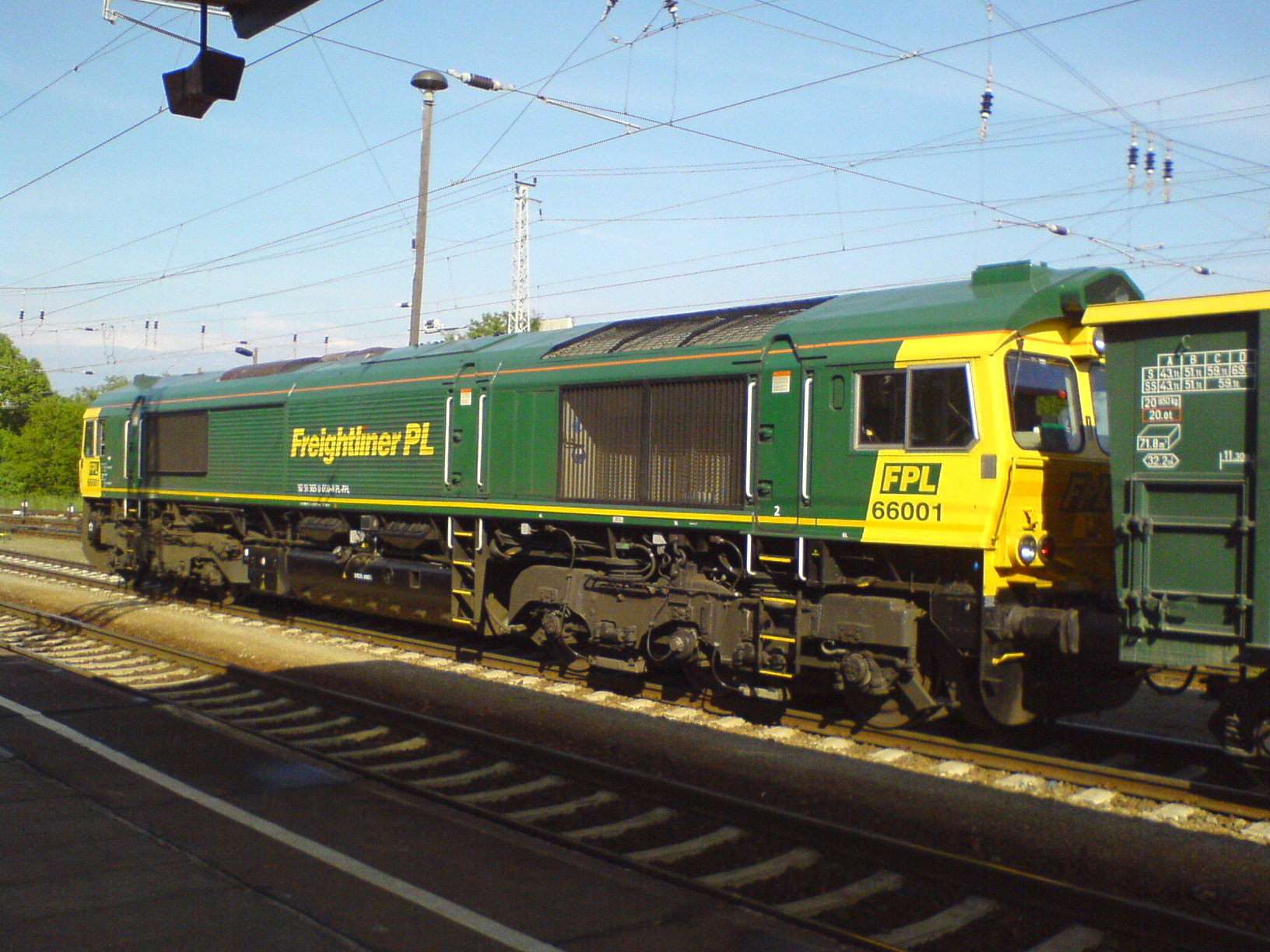
Freightliner PL EMD JT42CWRM #66001 at the station in Ruhland Germany (May 2008)

=== Europe ===
Certification (homologation) is needed for each country of operation. The locos were initially given a temporary certificate for use in France, (Note: Various modifications were required, including some additional to the fitment of the local train safety systems) and full certification came in 2009 (they had previously operated in France on some routes), Romanian certification came in 2007 The class is certified for operation in Germany, the Netherlands, Luxembourg, Belgium, Sweden, Norway, Poland and Denmark. As of 1 January 2009, certification for use in the Czech Republic and Slovakia was pending.

=== Africa ===
They are operated in Egypt by the Egyptian National Railways. They are operated on the Trans-Gabon Railway.

=== List of operators ===
Owner	Operator	Countries	Designation	Total	Comments
Beacon Rail (15); Halifax Asset Finance (33); Eversholt Rail Group (85); Porterbrook (60); Lloyds Bank (4)	Colas Rail; DB Cargo UK; Direct Rail Services; Freightliner; GB Railfreight	Great Britain	Class 66	455	See details in the British Rail Class 66 article
	Euro Cargo Rail	France	Class 66; Class 77	120	65 from parent company DB Cargo UK. 60 further locomotives during 2009 designated Class 77.
Alpha Trains	Freightliner PL (FPL)	Poland	Class 66	7	Part of Freightliner
CB Rail formerly Porterbrook	Rail4Chem Benelux (R4CB)	Benelux (Belgium, Netherlands & Luxembourg)		26	
CB Rail formerly Porterbrook	Heavy Haul Power International (HHPI)	Germany		26	
CB Rail formerly Porterbrook	BLS Cargo Nord	Belgium		26	
CB Rail formerly Porterbrook	Häfen und Güterverkehr Köln (HGK)	Germany	Class 266	26	
CB Rail formerly Porterbrook	ERS Railways (ERSR)	Netherlands		26	
CB Rail formerly Porterbrook	Railion Nederland (RN)	Netherlands		26	
Deutsche Leasing	Rail4Chem Benelux (R4CB)	Benelux (Belgium, Netherlands & Luxembourg)		1	
Egyptian National Railways (ENR)		Egypt	2120	40	First non-European customer, for passenger use.
GM/Opel leasing	Häfen und Güterverkehr Köln (HGK)	Germany	Class 266	2	
GM/GMAC leasing	Heavy Haul Power International (HHPI)	Germany		1	
Eversholt Rail Group	TGOJ Trafik (TGOJ)	Sweden	T66 713	1	Leased to IKEA rail AB, from 2012–07 to Rush Rail source
Eversholt Rail Group	CFL Cargo DK	Denmark	T66K 714 "Krudthornet"	1	Transferred to CFL Cargo DK in Padborg in 2010 (SE, DK ATC)
Eversholt Rail Group	CargoNet (CN)	Norway	CD66	6	Problems with driver cabin conditions (see above); Named Di9 as per Di series in procurement documents, in practice also called CD 66; To be replaced by Vossloh Euro 4000s on the Nordland Line
Eversholt Rail Group	Häfen und Güterverkehr Köln (HGK)	Germany	Class 266	5	
ERS Railways (ERSR)	Netherlands			5	
KBC lease group	BLS Cargo Nord	Belgium		4	
MRCE	BLS Cargo Nord	Belgium		~5	
MRCE	ERS Railways (ERSR)	Netherlands		~6	
MRCE	Häfen und Güterverkehr Köln (HGK)	Germany	Class 266	~2	
MRCE	Afzet Container Transport System (ACTS)	Netherlands		1	
MRCE	Dortmunder Eisenbahn (DE)	Germany		1	
MRCE	Veolia Cargo / Connex (VC)	Netherlands & France		1	
MRCE	Trainsport AG (TS)	Belgium		1	
MRCE	Rail4Chem (R4C)	Germany		1	
MRCE	NedTrain	Netherlands		1	
Setrag		Gabon		6	Two units built 2008, shipped July 2011. Four further units built and exported by 2012.

== See also ==
- Voith Maxima
- GE PowerHaul
- Vossloh Euro
- IE 201 Class
