= Bertschi AG =

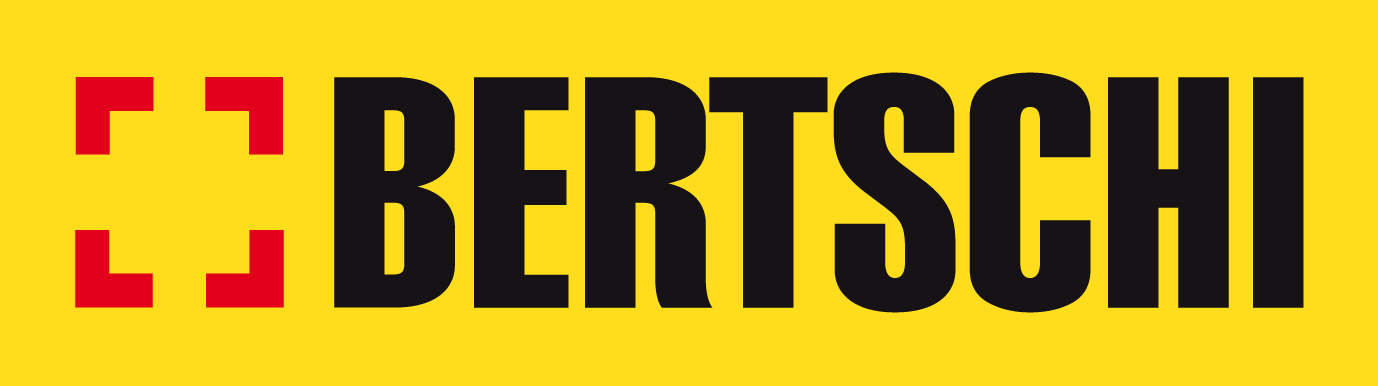
- Type: Private
- Founded: 1956; 70 years ago
- Founder: Hans Bertschi
- Headquarters: Dürrenäsch, Switzerland
- Number of locations: 64 (2023)
- Key people: Hans-Jörg Bertschi (Chairman); Jan Arnet (CEO); Michael Baechler (COO)
- Revenue: CHF 1.13 billion (2023)
- Number of employees: 3,210+ (2023)
- Website: bertschi.com

Bertschi AG (German pronunciation: ['bɛʁtʃiː]) is a Swiss multinational transportation company that primarily conducts logistics and transportation for the chemical industry. Founded in 1956, the company is headquartered in Dürrenäsch, Switzerland and has 64 locations globally (2023). Bertschi is a member of the European Chemical Transport Association.

== Operations ==
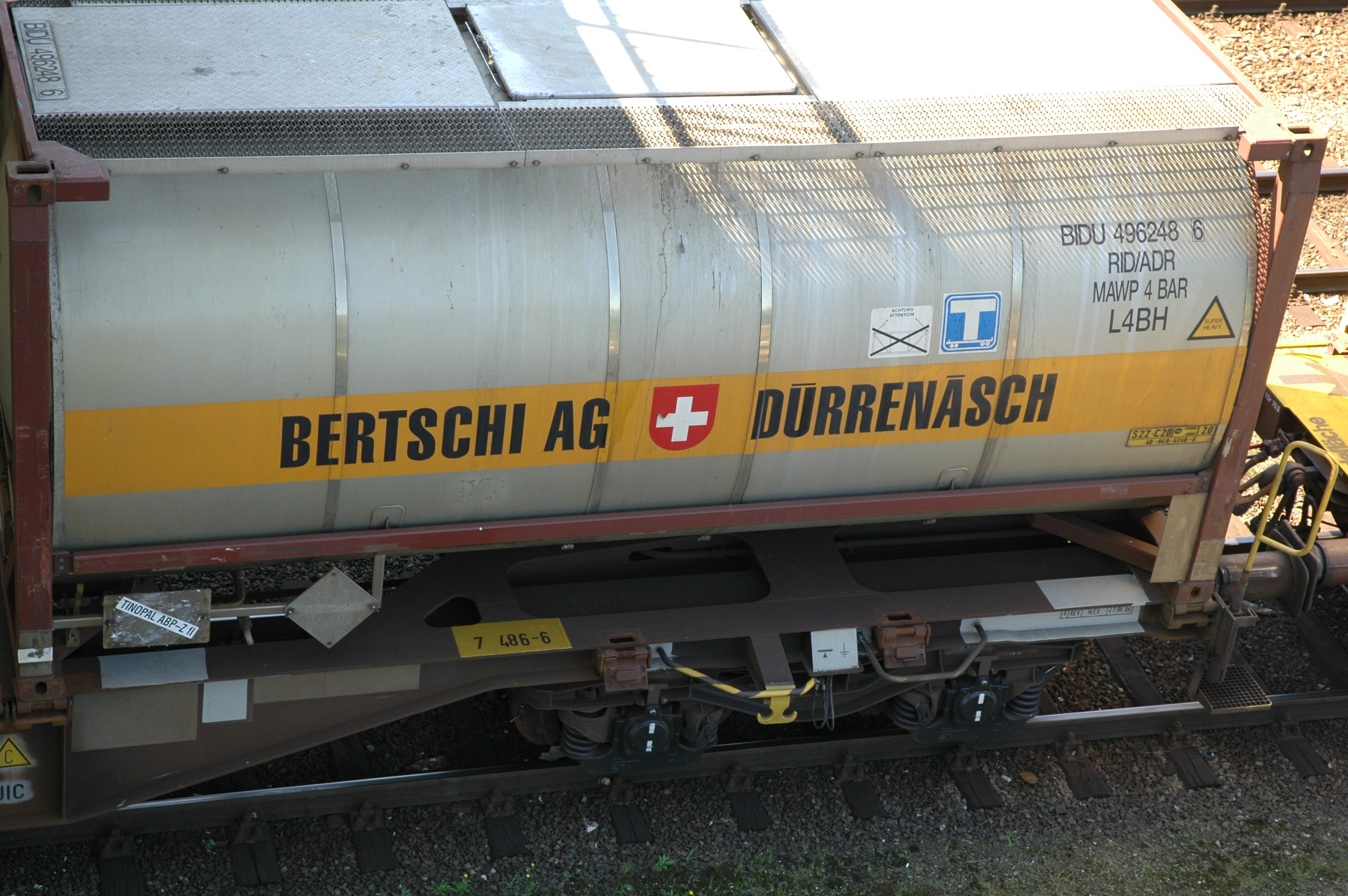
Bertschi intermodal tank container

Bertschi AG started operating a tank farm in 1998 at Chempark Leverkusen. The company purchased Swedish based Nordic Bulkers AB in 2005. Bertschi AG has subsidiaries throughout Europe, the Middle East, Russia, Singapore, Turkey, China and the United States. As of February 2018, the company employs 2,800 people in 38 countries with a total fleet of 32,000 tank and silo containers; 1,100 trucks; and 30 container terminals.

== History ==
Founded in 1956 by Hans Bertschi, of Dürrenäsch, as a sole proprietorship operating with one truck operating transports for instance steel from the Ruhr region to Switzerland. He was also a main supplier for the local cork industry. Bertschi AG (Bertschi Ltd.) was incorporated in 1964 and specialized in chemical goods. Later they became specialists for intermodal transportation and grew steadily under the second generation with Hans-Jörg Bertschi as president, he'd later become executive chairman.
