= Motorship (disambiguation) =

Motorship or motor ships, may refer to:

- Motor ship (motorship, M.S., M/S), a type of ship which uses an internal combustion engine to power its propulsion system
- The Motorship, a British shipping magazine established in 1920
- Motorships AS, a Norwegian shipping line

== See also ==
- Motorboat
- Motor vessel
- Motor (disambiguation)
- Ship (disambiguation)
- Motorboating (disambiguation)
