= Motorboating (disambiguation) =

Motorboating is travelling using a motorized boat.

Motorboating may also refer to:

- Motorboating (electronics), a specific type of radio interference
- Motorboating (sexual act), a form of breast fetishism

== See also ==
- Boating
- Motor boat
- Motorship (disambiguation)
- Motoring (disambiguation)
- Motor (disambiguation)
- Boat (disambiguation)
