= Motoring =

Motoring may refer to:

- Motoring (film), a 1927 British comedy film
- Motoring (TV series), a Canadian automotive television program (1988 to present)
- 310 Motoring, an automotive customization garage based in Los Angeles, California
- Motoring.co.uk, a UK website providing tools for motorists
- AA Motoring Trust
- Best Motoring International, Japanese automobile magazine
- Driving
- motoring hood, an item of clothing
- the song Sister Christian features the famous lyric "Motoring" in its chorus
- Motoring magazine, produced by the British Motor Company by in-house Nuffield Press

== See also ==
- Motor (disambiguation)
