= Ernst August Wagner =

German mass murderer (1874–1938)

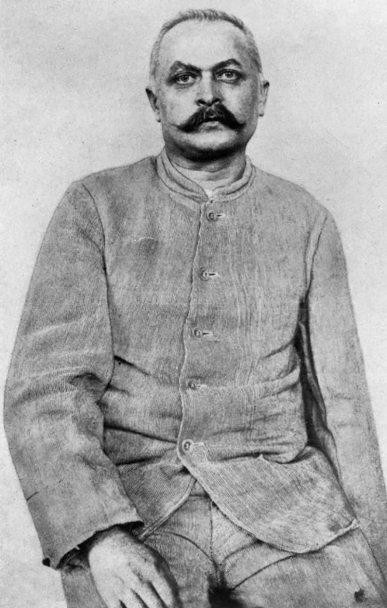
- Wagner in 1913
- Born: Ernst August Wagner; 22 September 1874; Eglosheim, Kingdom of Württemberg, German Empire
- Died: 27 April 1938 (aged 63); Winnenden, Gau Württemberg-Hohenzollern, Nazi Germany
- Occupation: Teacher
- Penalty: Involuntary commitment

Details
- Date: 4 September 1913
- Country: German Reich
- State: Württemberg
- Locations: Degerloch & Mühlhausen an der Enz
- Targets: Immediate family (Degerloch); Family-in-law and male residents (Mühlhausen)
- Killed: 14
- Injured: 11
- Weapons: Blackjack; Dagger; Two Mauser C96

Ernst August Wagner (22 September 1874 – 27 April 1938) was a German teacher and mass murderer. On 4 September 1913, Wagner fatally stabbed his wife and four children in Degerloch. He subsequently travelled to Mühlhausen an der Enz where he fatally shot nine people and wounded eleven others, before he was beaten unconscious by intervening villagers and left for dead.

Wagner cited his fear of being exposed as a zoophiliac as the primary motive. Despite widespread public calls for the death penalty, a team of psychiatrists, including Robert Gaupp, successfully argued that Wagner was not guilty by reason of insanity, the first such instance in Württemberg. He was brought to an asylum in Winnenden, where Wagner wrote several plays and dramas, none of which were ever performed. He died there of tuberculosis in 1938.

The case was of immediate interest due to Wagner's troubled personal life, marked by mental illness and familial issues, which was seen as having heavily contributed to the murders. Wagner's psychological profiling through Gaupp during his 25-year confinement at the asylum became one of his most prominent clinical patient studies. Wagner's case gained renewed attention in the 1990s within German academic spaces as an early example of a mass shooting and perceptions of societal collapse in the late German Empire.

== Early life and family ==
Ernst August Wagner was born on 22 September 1874 in Eglosheim near Ludwigsburg as the ninth of ten children to Luise Christiane Roth (also spelled Louise; 1838–1902) and Jakob Friedrich Wagner (1832–1876). He also had a half-brother and a half-sister. Most of Wagner's siblings died early and by 1913, only two sisters and one brother remained.

His maternal family was from Poppenweiler (now part of Ludwigsburg), while his paternal family was from Kleinbottwar (now part of Steinheim an der Murr). There were contradictory reports regarding the Roth family, which was noted to have had high rates of consanguine marriage through in its genealogy. An unnamed "expert" cited by Württembergische Zeitung claimed that the Roths were prone to "high nervous tension and haughtiness" while Enz-Bote described the family as being well-renowned, with several local officials amongst relatives. Wagner himself wrote that he and other relatives were affected by "Poppenweiler nervous illness", which he cited as a reason for "eradication" of the entire family.

The family first lived with Wagner's paternal grandfather before his father built a one-story house in the north of Eglosheim. Wagner's father was described as "conceited, unhappy, and work-averse", with alcoholic tendencies and known to blame his poor financial situation on others. He died on 21 September 1876, a day before Wagner's second birthday. His mother married Karl Baumhauer on February 1878, but divorced in 1880. Psychiatrist Robert Gaupp described Wagner's mother, whom he never met, as "abnormally sexually excited" and that she had several affairs, erroneously claiming that she remarried within five months of her husband's death rather than two years. On 18 April 1888, Wagner's mother sold the family's farm property to pay outstanding debts, running a small spice shop to provide for her children. Wagner's legal guardian was Ludwig Seyfang, a distance relative of his mother. Gaupp wrote that Wagner experienced depression and suicidal thoughts throughout his childhood due to his status as the "widow's boy".

Wagner attended the local one-room Volksschule in Egolsheim, located in St. Katharina church, graduating basic schooling in spring 1888, being considered the school's best student throughout his attendance. He also served as a sacristan and calcant at St. Katharina, having his confirmation in his last school year. He had his one-year preparatory seminar in Ludwigsburg, learning to play violin and piano for mandatory worship service. Following a medical checkup, which attested full health, he was cleared for training at the private preparatory school in Nürtingen for his aspirant exam. He completed his teacher studies in 1894 at the State Seminar for Didactics and Teacher Education Esslingen.

== Career ==
Between 1894 and 1913, Wagner worked permanent teaching positions in twelve school districts in thirteen towns throughout Württemberg. He also intermittently served his mandatory military service, training from August to October 1895 and participating in exercises in 1897, 1901, and 1904. Wagner was an assistant teacher in Renningen, Böblingen, Röthenbach, and Winzerhausen for one academic year each, then in Gerstetten and Oberreinbach between 1898 and 1899, and finally at Mittelschule I in Stuttgart, between 1899 and 1900. Between 1900 and 1901, Wagner was a Lehramtsverweser, a form of substitute teacher, in Heslach, Plieningen, and Oberweiler. While in Plieningen, Wagner only worked for three months before requesting six months of leave of absence on 12 April 1900, citing a doctor's certificate by his recently deceased primary care physician, which attested to "high-level nervosity, increased heart activity, and highly increased deep tendon reflexes". He was granted two months vacation, which he spent in Switzerland.

Upon his return to duty on 21 June 1900, he was assigned to Strümpfelbach, Schorndorf, and Lorch. In July 1901, he was assigned as Unterlehrer, a junior teaching position, in Mühlhausen an der Enz (now part of Mühlacker). He frequented the local Adler inn and according to Wagner, sometime in the summer of 1901, while on his way home from a night of drinking beer at the inn, he walked into the innkeeper's barn and sodomized a farm animal. Wagner never divulged the exact details of what happened, with several retrospective reports questioning whether he had invented the story. There were no witnesses and no one in Mühlhausen was aware of the incident, though his mother-in-law later told police that they did own a barn near the route from the inn to Wagner's residence. Regardless, Wagner felt "watched, followed, and mocked" by residents the day after, due to which he bought a revolver to evade a potential arrest. He carried the gun at all times, including at work in school along with 20 rounds of ammunition. That same year, Wagner began a sexual relationship 19-year-old Anna Friedericke Schlecht, the daughter of the Adler innkeeper. In November 1901, Wagner finished his second teaching exam.

In early 1902, Anna Schlecht became pregnant, which exposed their relationship as an unmarried couple. Wagner was solely interested in Anna based on physical attraction to her and consequently did not want to marry her, despite external pressure to do so. Due to the scandal, Wagner was suspended from work from 15 November to 2 December 1902 and transferred to Radelstetten, an isolated village of Lonsee, as a substitute teacher, which Wagner believed was a punitive measure. In early 1903, daughter Klara was born and in July 1903, Wagner was made Hauptlehrer to be the school's primary teacher. On 29 December 1903, Wagner married Anna in Ludwigsburg, partially because Klara was already ten months old. Wagner's belief that his apparent bestiality would be exposed still continued and he claimed that he attended the wedding with two revolvers, a dagger, and fifty rounds of ammunition.

Wagner admitted in his own writings that he viewed Anna as more of a servant than a partner, considering her intellectually inferior. Neighbours stated that Wagner treated his wife well, but that she regularly disagreed on his spending habits and hobby writing. Since age 23, Wagner had written poetry, first imitating the social commentary of Heinrich Heine out of admiration, though he later denounced him after realising he was Jewish. He again started writing in 1904, this time composing dramatic stage plays, which he paid to get published in local newspapers. Wagner wrote that he depicted excessive gore in the plays as a means of letting out his violent fantasies. While he did not gain success from his writings, Wagner often boasted about his literary skills while drunk at bars, comparing himself to William Shakespeare, Friedrich Schiller, and Johann Wolfgang von Goethe, sometimes demeaning the latter two and proclaiming himself "the greatest German poet" to other teachers. Besides his dramas, Wagner often discussed religion, espousing atheist views on the matter, and his support of free love. His diary contained "muddled things between delusions of grandeur and hatred of women", with references to Otto Weininger and Friedrich Nietzsche.

In the summer of 1904, he once again went to Switzerland, trying twice to commit suicide there, once by drowning himself and by jumping off a bridge, though both attempts failed. In the following years, his wife bore four more children, concluding in July 1909 with Rudolph Alfred. Wagner was said to have been unhappy about the births of his children and complained about the financial stress of feeding his family; he was seemingly indifferent to the interruption of his birthday in 1909 by infant Rudolph's death.

Some time in 1906 or 1907, thinking that the people from Mühlhausen had passed on their knowledge about his crime, the feelings of being ridiculed and watched by others returned, and as a consequence he began to make plans to take revenge on those whom he deemed to be the cause of his misery, the villagers, and especially the men, of Mühlhausen. In 1907 and 1909, Wagner bought two Mauser C96 pistols from a Mauser factory in Oberndorf for 100 mark each.

Between 1909 and 1911 he made several requests to be transferred to another school, which was granted, so that on 1 May 1912 he began his work at a school in Degerloch, a suburb of Stuttgart. At that time he also decided to go ahead with his plan, as even at his new workplace he saw hints of people "knowing", and initially chose the spring of 1913 to put it into practice, but determined the last days of the summer holidays to commit the murders. In the days leading to the murders he wrote several letters to explain his actions.

== 1913 murders ==
=== Family murders ===
List of victims

Killed:
- Degerloch:
  - Anna Wagner, 31-32 Wagner's wife
  - Klara Wagner, 10, his daughter
  - Elsa Wagner, 8, his daughter
  - Robert Wagner, 6, his son
  - Richard Wagner, 5, his son
- Mühlhausen an der Enz:
  - Marie Magdalena Bader, 10-11, student
  - Georg Friedrich Bauer, 64, fat goods trader
  - Johann Friedrich Geissinger, 60, farmer
  - Adolf Heinrich Knötzele, 52-53, farmer
  - Johann Jakob Knötzele, 50, cooper
  - Johann Georg Müller, 54, labourer
  - Jakob Franz Schmierer, 32 or 34, bricklayer
  - Christian Thomas Vogel, 65, bricklayer
  - Christian Widmayer, 68, shepherd

Injured:

- Katharine Bader, mother of Marie
- Tobias Bader, father of Marie
- Luise Bauer, 11, student, shot in the abdomen
- Karl Benz, 62, railway worker, shot in both arms
- Jakob Bopp, farmer
- Tobias Kientsch, 57, police officer, shot in the thigh
- Friedrich Nägele, 19, farmer, shot in the chest
- Frida Maier, 21-22, shot in the arm
- Johann Martini, tailor
- Fritz Müller, 17, farmer, shot in the thigh
- Unnamed woman

In the early morning hours of 4 September 1913, Wagner killed his wife Anna in their bedroom. According to Wagner's later testimony, he had memory gaps of the night's events, but believed that after going to sleep at around 21:00 the previous day, he awoke at least once to see if Anna was still asleep. He again got up at about 5 a.m. and retrieved a blackjack and dagger, which he may have hid under his pillow in advance. Wagner repeatedly hit Anna in the head and once he believed she was unconscious, he stabbed her numerous times in her throat and chest, cutting her carotid arteries and hitting her heart and lungs. Afterwards he successively entered the bedrooms of his two sons, Robert and Richard, and his daughters, Klara and Elsa, and stabbed each of them in their throat and chest. Wagner initially claimed that he had also hit his children with the blackjack, though later he was uncertain of this.

After covering his family members' bodies with blankets, Wagner got out of his blood-soaked nightshirt and washed himself, before packing a bag with three guns (two Mauser C96 pistols and a small revolver), 500 rounds of ammunition, a black veil from his wife and her handbag. He then left his home, leaving a note at his own door that the family was jaunting to Ludwigsburg, as well as another one at the door of his landlady, another teacher surnamed Stepper, ordering three litres of milk and leaving behind 35 pfennig as payment.

He cycled towards Stuttgart Hauptbahnhof, from where he took a train to Ludwigsburg. where he bought a backpack, before making his way to his brother's home in Eglosheim, arriving there at about 11 a.m. As his brother was not at home, Wagner chatted a while with his wife, telling her he wanted to spend the night at their home after fetching his children from Mühlhausen, and, as it could get late, the house should stay accessible to him during the night. In an unobserved moment, he hid 228 rounds of ammunition in a haystack in the garden. Wagner, accompanied by his nephew and niece, walked to the next train station, where he took a train to Bietigheim at about 1 p.m. From there, he took off towards Großsachsenheim.

Before setting off for Mühlhausen, he mailed letters to several people, among them some of his relatives, including one to his sister simply reading "Nimm Gift!" ("Rest assured!"; lit. 'Take poison!'), another addressed to theologist and philosopher Christoph Schrempf, as well as a newspaper. Subsequently, he returned to Bietigheim, where he had his bicycle checked by a mechanic and mailed two copies of his autobiography, one again to Christoph Schrempf. At about 7 p.m. he left for Mühlhausen an der Enz.

=== Spree shooting ===
Wagner reached the hills near Mühlhausen at about 11 p.m. His bicycle and the small revolver were later found hidden in a corn field. Wagner set out to cut the telephone lines to the village with a file, but as the poles looked too high to him and due to heavy rain that had set in by that time, he dropped that part of his plan. In Mühlhausen, where he set fire to four barns, targeting that of his family in-law, before walking through the streets and shooting residents. Wagner claimed that he was specifically targeting male villagers and that the female victims (two young girls, two elderly women, and a young adult woman) were accidentally hit. Apparently as a disguise, Wagner wore his wife's veil and a motoring hood. He also tied both of his handguns to his wrists with shoelaces to avoid losing them.

In total he spent about 80 rounds and shot 20 people, instantly killing eight of them, as well as two cattle. A ninth person, Jakob Knötzele, was mortally wounded and died a few hours after the shooting had ended. Five barn properties, belonging to six families, were burned down, including some stables and outbuildings, while the fire at the Adler inn of Wagner's in-laws was extinguished by a locally stationed military unity. After Wagner killed the last two victims, Friedrich Bauer and Georg Müller, outside the Adler inn, Wagner was having difficulty reloading his now empty weapons when his feet became entangled with the long string of the shoelaces he tied his guns to, due to which he ended up tripping, thus allowing two civilian men, Wilhelm Bürle and Christian Müller, as well as police officer Tobias Kientsch to strike him down with hoes and sabres. He suffered several wounds in his face and right hand, and his left hand was smashed and nearly cut off. Knocked unconscious, he was disarmed and left for dead, but at 2 a.m., local police chief Dirschinger found him lying on the street, still breathing.

Wagner was temporarily kept at the poorhouse of Mühlhausen. Landjäger gendarmes had to keep angry crowds from nearing the scene. Wagner was quickly identified by his brother-in-law. In the evening of 5 September 1913, Wagner, who uttered concerns that he might get ill if he had stayed too long in Mühlhausen, was brought to a hospital in Vaihingen, where his left forearm was amputated and his other wounds treated. The transport happened under strong security due to concerns that local residents might lynch Wagner if he stayed.

== Investigation ==
In custody, Wagner first refused to speak about his motive, but he eventually confessed to killing his family in Degerloch. He also stated that he wanted to kill himself and asked to be beheaded. On 6 September, while at the Vaihingen district hospital, Wagner gave his primary motive as revenge for supposed mockery by Mühlhausen residents for the 1901 bestiality incident and that the murder of his family was part of an extended suicide.

Amongst the documents sent out before the shootings, Wagner included a manifesto entitled "An mein Volk!" ("To my People!"), in which he justified the murders as both vengeance and as part of a greater plan to eradicate half of the population based on their "physical constitution". Psychiatrist Norbert Nedopil pointed out an earlier writing of Wagner from 1909, in which he proclaimed himself "the first National Socialist", before the term was used in Nazism. In the 1909 document, Wagner voiced a hatred of the "ill and weak" and wrote that he saw himself as the "executioner", saying he wanted to kill 25 million fellow Germans in order to maintain a "pure, healthy region". He excluded himself from this group as Wagner considered himself a "good person" if one were to "factor out sexuality". Wagner himself stated that he was motivated by shame for his past bestiality, telling court officials that he planned to murder everyone in Mühlhausen since he thought they might make fun of him, but maintained that he only killed his family out of "mercy" so they would not be affected by his later killings, also claiming that he had acted due to a coming doomsday event.

== Trial ==
Following his trial in Heilbronn, Wagner was the first person in Württemberg to be found not guilty by reason of insanity after several psychiatric assessments diagnosed him with delusions of paranoia.

== Asylum ==
Wagner was interned at Landesheilanstalt Winnental (now Klinikum Schloß Winnenden). He wrote a 300-page autobiography, in which Wagner claimed to have also planned to hijack a train for Ludwigsburg, with a stop in his hometown of Egolsheim to kill his brother's family, in order to break into the Ludwigsburg Palace to kill himself by self-immolation on the bed of Duchess Olga of Württemberg.

Having previously written plays under a pseudonym since 1904, Wagner continued writing verse drama until 1922. In 1918, he unsuccessfully submitted plays to the Staatstheater Stuttgart, the University of Tübingen, several newspapers, and the Schillerpreis literary competition, arguing that performing his work alone would be an honour for each institution. Knowledge of the plays remained limited to the asylum, which kept the scripts and advertisements Wagner printed at the asylum workshop, but Wagner nevertheless accused other writers of plagiarizing his work, at one point printing an antisemitic poster against Franz Werfel. By 1925, Wagner openly told his psychiatrists that he blamed Jews for all his problems.

In 1918, shortly before the end of World War I, Wagner wrote a letter to the government, requesting release to enlist in the Reichswehr and train as a machine gunner for deployment to the frontlines. The following year, Wagner wrote to his sister that he was certain that Germany would have won the war had he commanded the military. In 1930, with the rise of the Nazi Party, Wagner began calling himself "the first National Socialist in Winnental" in support and while he attempted to join the party via letter application, he received no responses. In 1938, Wagner told staff that he had actually killed his children due to his belief in eugenics in line with the Nazi government's racial hygiene policies, claiming they had inherited his disposition to bestiality.

Throughout his confinement, Wagner was the subject of several case studies, remaining known in forensic psychiatric literature as "Hauptlehrer Wagner" ("Headteacher Wagner"). Wagner was also recorded for a series of attempted suicides, believed to have been a means of attention seeking as these never resulted in serious injury. He contracted tuberculosis days after the final attempt and died as a result in 1938.

== Legacy ==
The funeral of the Mühlhausen victims was attended by over 5,000 people. The event was organised by the Württemberg branch of Deutscher Kriegerbund, as four of the victims, Christian Widmayer, Friedrich Geissinger, Jakob Knötzle and Christian Vogel, were military veterans. The funeral of the Wagner family the following day was also attended by several thousands, with several people being hospitalised for fainting out of grief during the remembrance march. The victims are memorialised with plaques at the cemetery.

Residents initially believed that the arson and shootings were part of a bandit attack. In part to this, Wagner was given the byname of the "Murder Arsonist" ("Mordbrenner"), after the character Karl Moor in The Robbers, who also set fire to a town. The murders were subject to sensationalist press reports across Europe. Wagner was seen in a unique light compared to other mass murderers, who typically had prior criminal histories or otherwise negative reputations, as those who examined him described Wagner as mild-mannered and polite. However, modern psychiatrists noted that colleagues of Wagner additionally described him as an arrogant and overly sensitive man with a superiority complex. Robert Gaupp used his experiences with Wagner to differentiate between paranoia as a symptom of schizophrenia and "real paranoia" without accompaniments such as hallucinations and with a lack of other cognitive impairments. Despite the initial extensive coverage, reports ceased almost entirely within two weeks.

Two of the men who stopped Wagner, Tobias Kientsch and Wilhelm Bürle, received silver Militärverdienstmedaille for their actions. In October 1913, a public dispute between Kientsch and Bürle arose, as Kientsch remained insistent that he hit Wagner first, with Bürle alleging that Kientsch and his wife harassed him and others who questioned his testimony. Kientsch stated that he encountered Wagner and tried to hide in a stable before Wagner found and shot him. Immediately after, Kientsch struck Wagner with his sabre, causing him two jump backwards and run away, hitting a fire truck and falling. Bürle claimed that he first hid in a stable after seeing Wagner heading in his direction. After Wagner killed Bauer and Müller, Wagner turned around and fired another five or six shots at an unseen target. After realising that Wagner was a stranger and acted alone, Bürle jumped on Wagner's back and hit him twice in the head with a hoe before falling off. Afterwards, Kientsch arrived and attacked Wagner, causing Wagner to tangle his feet in his shoelaces and fall at the spot. Administrators of Mühlhausen and other local government officials sided with Kientsch.

The 1919 novella Klein und Wagner by Hermann Hesse has Ernst Wagner as a recurring nightmare figure to protagonist Friedrich Klein, a bank employee who abandoned his family, an act which he likens in severity to Wagner's familicide. Klein imagines Wagner as a personifcation of his own violent urges and despite repeated goading into murder by Wagner, Klein eventually recognises his own failings that led to his current predicament and rather than lashing out at his surrounding, Klein kills himself as a means of finding redemption.

The house where Wagner killed his family remained open for rent, though it remained unused for several months before a diaconia worker moved in. As of 2019, the building was still in use.

The shooting in Mühlhausen led to calls for gun control, as firearm purchase and ownership were unrestricted in Württemberg at the time. A law change, Regelung des Verkehrs mit Waffen und Munition, was planned in 1913, but delayed due to World War I; the Weimar Republic government introduced gun permits in 1928. Wagner's bicycle is known to have remained in use by police officers for several years. Reports initially misidentified the guns as Browning pistols, partially due to a lack of knowledge, with the Browning being popularly depicted in contemporary detective novels and to associate the murders with foreign gun makers rather than domestic ones.

Der Tagesspiegel wrote, in light of the 2009 Winnenden and Wendlingen shootings and the 2011 Norway attacks, the former of which took place near the former Winnental clinic, Wagner's case can be seen as a precursor to modern mass killings in their extensive planning and desire for attention. Tim Kretschmer, the perpetrator in the Winnenden shootings, was reported to have held a fascination with the Mühlhausen shooting.

== See also ==
- Bremen school shooting, another German mass shooting by a teacher committed the same year

== Literature ==
- Foerster, Klaus (Hrsg.): Wahn und Massenmord. Perspektiven und Dokumente zum Fall Wagner. Verlag Sindlinger-Burchartz, Frickenhausen 1999, ISBN 978-3-928812-19-1.
- van Raden, Rolf: Patient Massenmörder. Der Fall Ernst Wagner und die biopolitischen Diskurse. Unrast-Verlag, Münster 2009, ISBN 978-3-89771-754-1 (Edition DISS Bd. 25)
- Blom, Philipp: Der taumelnde Kontinent – Europa 1900–1914. München: Carl Hanser-Verlag 2009, S. 421-452 (chapter: 1913 – Wagners Wahn).
