= Robert Gaupp =

German psychiatrist and neurologist

Robert Eugen Gaupp (3 October 1870 – 30 August 1953) was a German psychiatrist and neurologist who was a native of Neuenbürg, Württemberg.

Gaupp was an assistant to Carl Wernicke (1848–1905) and Karl Bonhoeffer (1868–1948) at the University of Breslau, and afterwards worked with Emil Kraepelin (1856–1926) at Heidelberg University and the Ludwig-Maximilians-Universität München. From 1908 to 1936, he was a professor of psychiatry at the University of Tübingen. One of his assistants was Ernst Kretschmer. Following World War II, he was departmental head of health and welfare for the city of Stuttgart (1945–48).

Gaupp performed numerous investigations of psychological disorders, and is remembered for his case studies of mass-murderer Ernst August Wagner (1874–1938). He was particularly interested in correlations between personality and psychosis, and was an advocate of "pastoral psychology". For a period of time, he was also editor of the Zentralblatt für Nervenheilkunde und Psychiatrie.

Sometime shortly after the passage by decree, on 15 September 1935, of the "Nuremberg Laws"(officially "Laws for the Protection of German Blood and Honor"), Gaupp came to the support of a local physician, Albrecht Schroeder (pictured at left in image below), a collegiate fraternity brother in a non-fighting order, die Igel (the Hedgehogs), to which Gaupp also belonged. With the passage of the Nuremberg Laws and the preemption of organizational authority to permit Jewish membership in non-dueling fraternal orders (Jews had never been permitted to join German dueling orders), Schroeder's status was made precarious because he was married to a Jew, née Felicia Rosenstein of Bad Cannstatt, an outer district of Stuttgart. At a meeting convened of the general membership to decide upon Schroeder's suitability for membership given Schroeder's marital status and his "Mischling" (mixed race) children, Gaupp, otherwise unaffiliated with Schroeder (Gaupp was 65 at the time, Schroeder 44; and the two had never before met), declared before those assembled: "Wenn der Schroeder raus muss, dann geh ich auch." (If Schroeder goes, then I go, too.) Schroeder withdrew his petition sometime before final disposition by the fraternity towards his case, and Gaupp himself left the organization voluntarily around the same time, as he had pledged doing on behalf of Schroeder. The two men remained close friends until Gaupp's death in 1953.

Schroeder and Gaupp, c. 1950

== Publications ==
- Psychologie des Kindes, Leipzig/Berlin, 1907
