= NSB El 13 =

Class of Norwegian electric locomotives

NSB class El 13
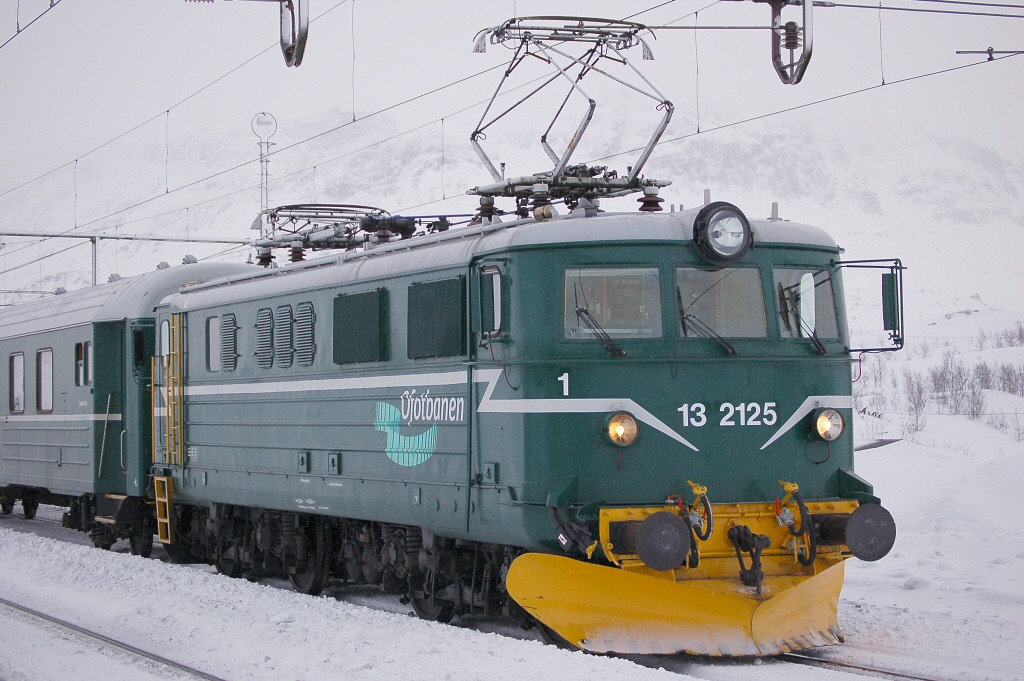
- An El 13 operated by Ofotbanen AS
Type and origin
- Power type: Electric
- Builder: Thunes Mekaniske Værksted A/S
- Build date: 1957–1966
Specifications
- Configuration
  - UIC: Bo'Bo'
- Gauge: 1,435 mm (4 ft 8 1/2 in) standard gauge
- Length: 15 m (49 ft 3 in)
- Loco weight: 72 t (71 long tons; 79 short tons)
- Electric system/s: 15 kV 16.7 Hz Catenary
- Current pickup: Pantograph
Performance figures
- Maximum speed: 100 km/h (62 mph)
- Power output: 2,648 kW (3,550 hp)
Career
- Operators: Norwegian State Railways
- Number in class: 37
- Numbers: 13 2121 – 13 2144; 13 2151 – 13 2163
- First run: 1957

NSB El 13 is a Norwegian electric locomotive which was used by Norwegian State Railways (NSB) for both passenger and freight trains.

The locomotive is a heavier and upgraded version of the NSB El 11 which was popular among its crew but unsuitable for journeys in heavy snow on lines such as the Bergen Line. Like the El 11, the El 13s were produced by Thune. The engines are very similar to the El 11, the main visual differences are that the El 13 is half a metre longer and has three, rather than four, windows at each end of the locomotive. The first of the 37 engines were built in 1957, the last in 1966. They were numbered 13 2121 to 13 2144 and 13 2151 to 13 2163.

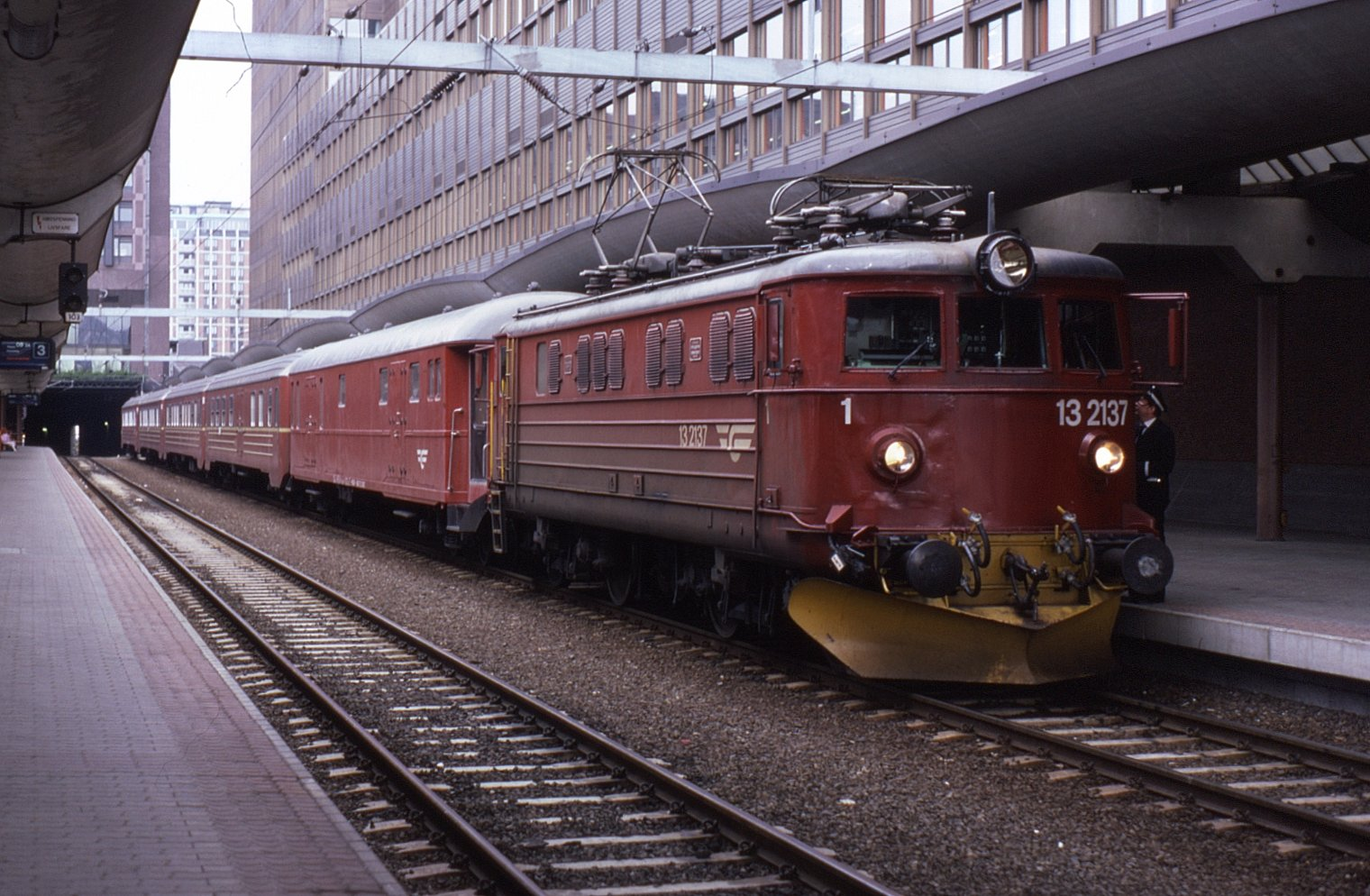
El 13 2137 at Oslo Central Station in 1986

The engines were withdrawn from service during the 1990s as several passenger trains were replaced with multiple units and the NSB El 18 took over the remaining locomotive hauled trains. As of 2005, There are still seven El 13s in service on the Ofoten Line. One of them, El 13 2142, was donated from CargoNet to the Norwegian Railway Museum in 2003 and so far, 2142 is the only El 13 in preservation.
