= Unionsexpressen =

Train service in Norway and Sweden

Unionsexpressen Scandinavian Railway AB
- Company type: Private
- Industry: Rail transport
- Founded: 2008
- Headquarters: Stockholm, Sweden
- Area served: Scandinavia
- Website: www.unionsexpressen.com

Unionsexpressen (lit. 'The Union Express') was an intercity train service provided between Oslo and Stockholm, the capitals of Norway and Sweden. The first-class only service was operated by company Unionsexpressen Scandinavian Railway AB, while haulage and Norwegian representation was operated by Ofotbanen.

In 2005, the state-owned SJ and Norges Statsbaner (NSB) cooperation Linx closed services on the Oslo–Stockholm route. The first trial runs of the Unionsexpressen started on 11 April 2008, with regular service commencing on 15 June. Operations were terminated on 7 October, following the bankruptcy of Ofotbanen.

== Service ==
Unionsexpressen was an all first-class intercity service which operates between Oslo and Stockholm. The express competes with the X2000 service provided by SJ. The latter has a somewhat longer travel time, since it makes more stops along the way. The Unionsexpressen trains were hauled by Ofotbanen-operated Rc-locomotives leased from SJ. Each train had four cars, of which three were open seating, and one was a dining car. The service had higher prices than the SJ service, but instead offers more luxury. The founders stated that the service is inspired by the Orient Express. With a full restaurant on board, fresh-made meals can be purchased, along with beverages. The seating compartments are newly renovated, with wooden interior, three-abreast seating and Wi-Fi.

On weekdays, there was a single daily round trip, leaving Oslo in the morning, and returning in the afternoon. On Saturdays, the line only operated from Oslo to Stockholm, and on Sundays only from Stockholm to Oslo. Stops were provided at Lillestrøm and Kongsvinger in Norway, and Karlstad, Hallsberg and Södertälje in Sweden. Travel time from Oslo to Stockholm was 5 hours and 25 minutes.

== History ==
With the termination of NSB's and SJ's cooperation Linx on the Oslo–Stockholm route in January 2005, Ofotbanen announced they would be willing to take over operation of the route from the summer. However, SJ and NSB held monopolies on non-subsidized passenger trains services in their respective countries, and it would not be possible for a private company to operate the route. In May 2007, Ofotbanen announced its plans for the Oslo–Stockholm train, after necessary permissions had been granted from Norwegian and Swedish authorities, who decided to allow free competition on international routes. By then, SJ had already reopened its route on the line. In March 2008, plans had been launched to start operations in April, but Ofotbanen did not meet the requirements to get a safety license from the inspectorates. The company rented rolling stock from SJ, including an Rc locomotives, and newly renovated cars from the 1960s.

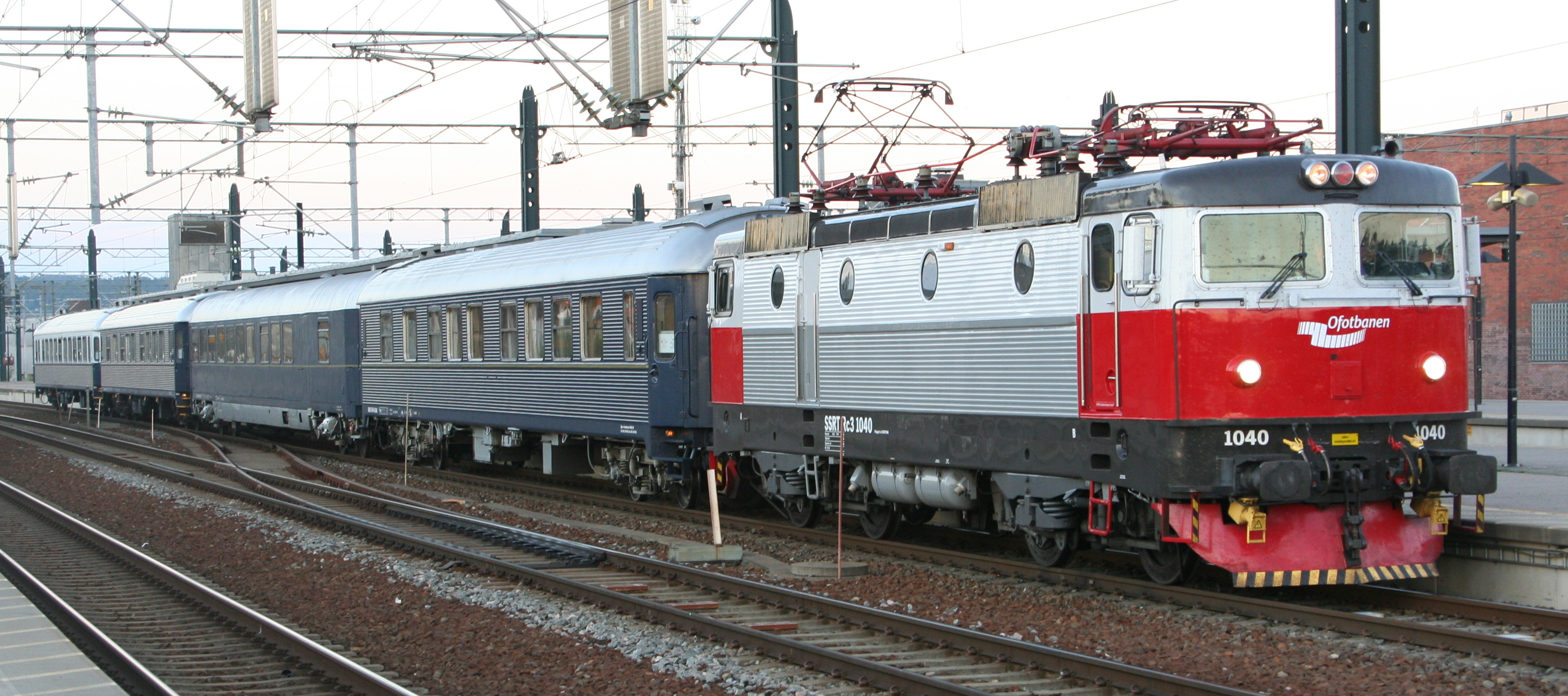
The Union Express at Lillestrøm

The necessary certificates were granted on 10 April, and the first trial run was made the following day. Ordinary service started on 25 April, though without the dining car. The initial price was 422 kr, and travel time was 5 hours 45 minutes. 0 From 15 June, full service was introduced, and the price increased to NOK 593. By July, Ofotbanen had still not found a locomotive for the second train, and was still operating only a single round service. Passenger numbers were at 35 per departure, far from the capacity of 84 and the necessary annual 100,000 needed to make a profit.

Following the bankruptcy in Ofotbanen on 7 October, all service was halted. The owners have reestablished Ofotbanen under the new entity Ofotbanen Drift, but SJ has withdrawn the leasing of the locomotive. The service was therefore never reestablished.
