= Ofotbanen (company) =

Norwegian rail transport company

Ofotbanen Drift AS
- Company type: Private
- Industry: Rail transport
- Predecessor: Ofotbanen AS
- Founded: 20 March 2001
- Defunct: May 2010
- Headquarters: Narvik, Norway
- Area served: Scandinavia
- Key people: Terje Østensen (CEO); Thor Ask Terkelsen (chair)
- Owner: Mons Bolin
- Parent: Rail Management
- Website: www.ofotbanen.no (out of service)

Ofotbanen Drift AS, trading as Ofotbanen, was a Norwegian passenger and freight railway company. The company operated a fleet of six locomotives, three multiple units, 22 passenger and 48 freight cars. The sole service was the passenger train Unionsexpressen between Oslo and Stockholm; it had previously offered freight haulage on contract.

The company was founded in 2001, and took over Norges Statsbaner's (NSB) passenger operation of the Ofoten Line in 2003. The following year it entered the freight market, in particular with timber trains for Norske Skog. It further expanded into other services, such as charter trips. In 2006, the company almost went bankrupt, and was taken over by Rail Management. In 2007, the automotive distributor Autolink started purchasing the autorack operations from Ofotbanen, and at the same time bought 40% of the company. 2008 saw a dramatic decline in operations, as both the Norske Skog, Autolink and passenger train services were terminated. In April the company started service with the Unionexpressen between Oslo and Stockholm. The company went bankrupt in October, but was immediately re-established as Ofotbanen Drift. In May 2010, the new company filed for bankruptcy.

== Operation ==
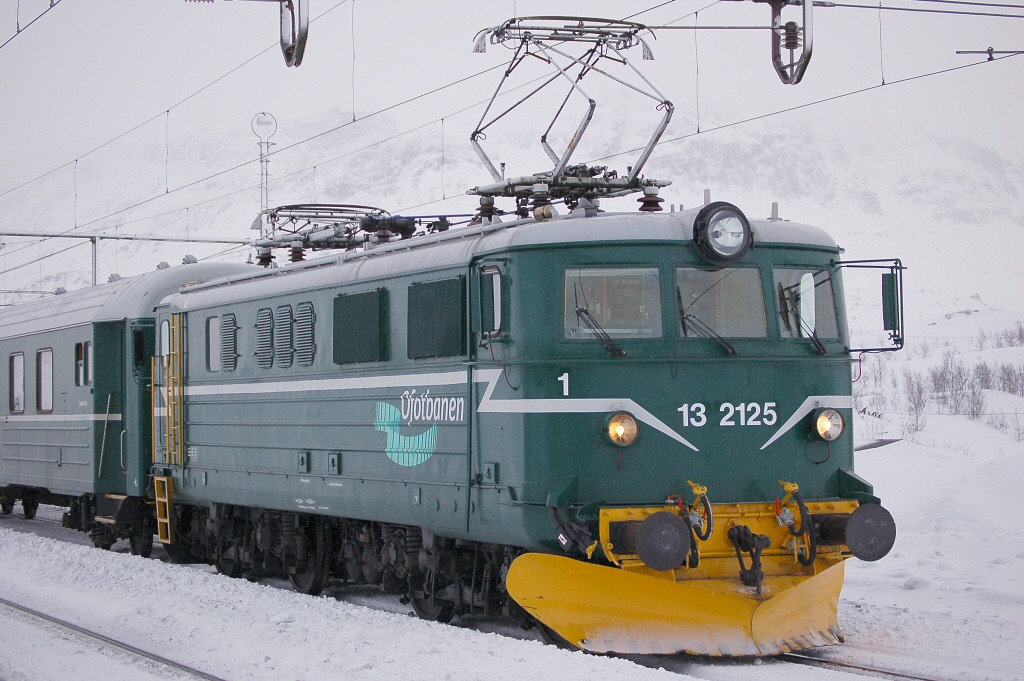
El 13 hauling a passenger train

The company was based in Narvik, a city that is only connected to the rest of the Norwegian railway network through Sweden. The company was led by CEO Terje Østensen and Chairman Thor Ask Terkelsen.

=== Unionsexpressen ===
The Union Express is a passenger train service between the Norwegian and Swedish capitals of Oslo and Stockholm. The service was a cooperation between Ofotbanen and the Swedish company Scandinavian Railway. In competition with SJ, it operates one daily round trip, in 5 hours 45 minutes, between Oslo and Stockholm, using renovated stock from the 1960s. While more expensive than SJ, the service aims at being more luxurious. One of the four cars is a traditional dining car, and the company markets the product as a first-class only service. Each train has a capacity of 84 riders, and provides perks such as Wi-Fi and 2+1 seating. The service has not operated since 7 October 2008, due to the bankruptcy in Ofotbanen, and SJ no longer being willing to rent out locomotives to the company.

=== Rolling stock ===
The company had five Di 3 diesel locomotives, and a single El 13 electric locomotive. Ofotbanen had 22 B3 passenger carriages, used for charter trains. These were supplemented by three two-car Class 68 electric multiple units. The 48 freight cars the company used were owned by Nord-Norsk Spedisjon. Of these, 19 were timber cars. All stock was painted dark green. All motorized stock was used stock that NSB has chosen to take out of service.

	Class	Type	Quantity	Built	Power	Speed	Notes
Di 3	Di 3	Diesel locomotive	5	1957–69	1,305 kW (1,750 hp)	105 km/h (65 mph)	
	El 13	Electric locomotive	1	1958	2,648 kW (3,551 hp)	100 km/h (62 mph)	
	Class 68	Electric multiple unit	3	1958–60	640 kW (860 hp)	100 km/h (62 mph)	
	Z71	Diesel shunter	5	1961–68	333 kW (447 hp)	70 km/h (43 mph)	Sold to Cargolink in 2008

== History ==
=== Establishment ===
Ofotbanen AS was founded on 20 March 2001. In November, it bought five used Di 3 for NOK 250,000 each, well under market price, from Norges Statsbaner (NSB). The purchase raised controversy, because the potential operator Banetransport had offered full market price for the trains. Also, NSB had to rent back several of the locomotives for six months, while six of eleven brand-new Class 93 trains were out of service. NSB paid the whole purchase price for the six-month rental.

In 2003, NSB announced that they wanted to discontinue their operations in Narvik, hoping they could leave operation of passenger trains on the Ofot Line to Ofotbanen. In May, NSB signed an agreement with Ofotbanen, where the latter would take over NSB's responsibilities to operate trains from Narvik to Riksgränsen along the Ofot Line. The initial contract would last until 2006, and NSB paid NOK 13 million for the service. From 15 June, Ofotbanen took over all passenger transport on the line, including employing all former NSB employees in Narvik. On the same day, Connex Tåg took over the operations on the Swedish side of the border after winning a public service obligation contract with the Swedish government, and dismissing SJ of the right to offer the service. An operating and security license was granted from the Norwegian Railway Inspectorate to Ofotbanen on 11 June.

=== Expansion ===
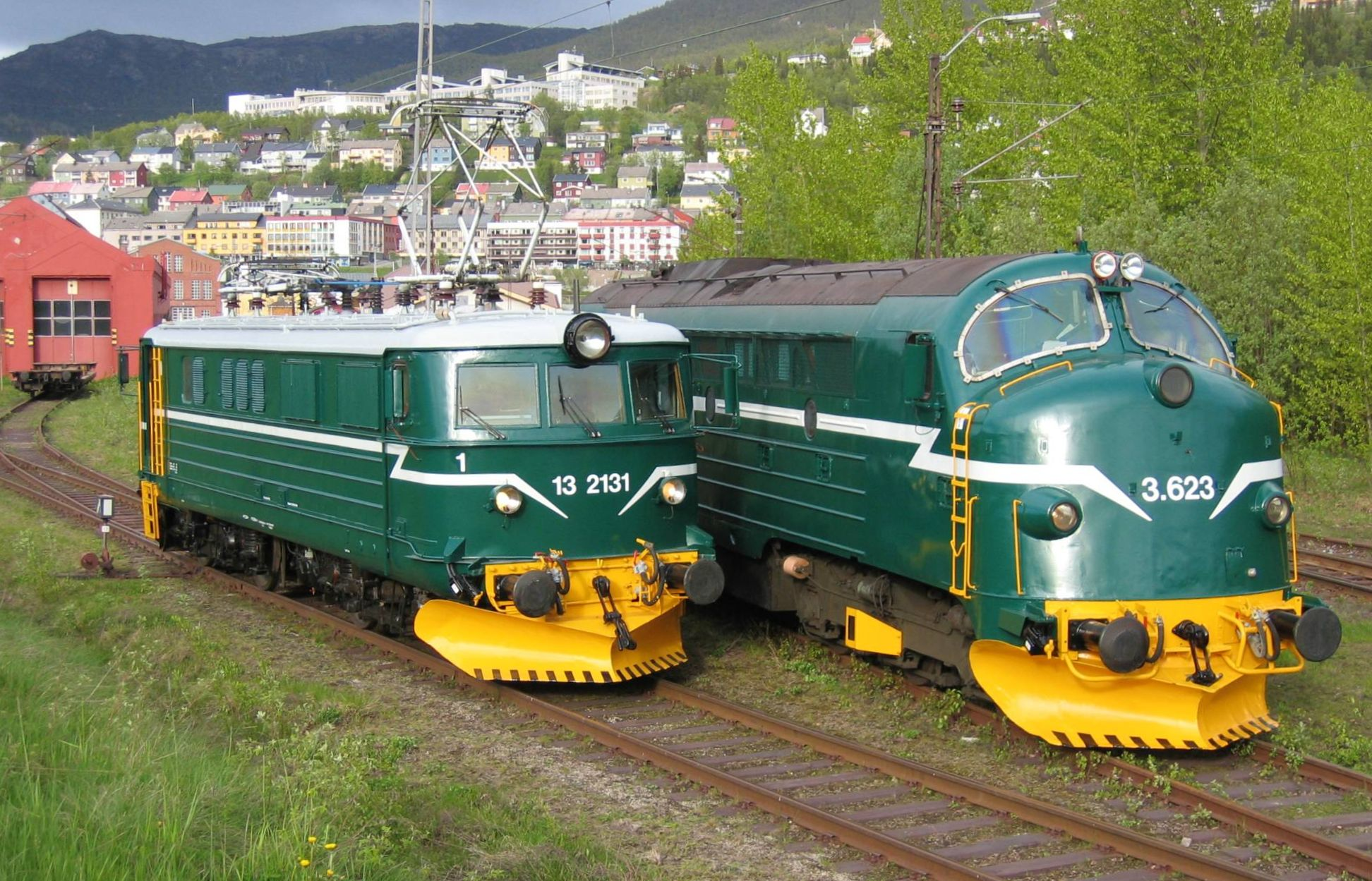
The El 13 and Di 3 are the haulage locomotives used by Ofotbanen.

In 2003, the company managed to cover it costs, and the company stated that it hoped to have a revenue of NOK 30 million the following year, through an ambitious expansion plan. A private offering for NOK 8 million was issued to allow this expansion. Among the purchasers was the Municipality of Narvik and Narvik Port Authority. In March, Chair Rune Arnøy was forced to withdraw after accusations of conflict of interest, since he was both chair of Ofotbanen and harbormaster at the Port of Narvik. CargoNet, a freight competitor of Ofotbanen, had felt that they were being unfairly treated by the port after the municipality had bought shares in Ofotbanen and appointed Arnøy as chair. The legality of the port's purchase of the shares was considered by the Norwegian Coastal Administration; though deemed legal, the port authority was required to sell the shares within three years. In April, Ofotbanen received a permit to operate in Sweden, and started offering charter trains between Narvik and Kiruna in Sweden, primarily for cruise ship passengers. It also announced that it was going to bid for the public service obligations for subsidized passenger railway transport that the government was planning to conduct in 2006. In June, Ofotbanen received permission to operate freight trains throughout the entire railway network in Norway. This was the first time such permission was granted to a different company than NSB or its subsidiaries.

In September, Ofotbanen was one of six companies prequalified to bid for the first public service obligation tender on the Gjøvik Line. However, the company chose to not submit a bid, and the contract was won by the NSB subsidiary NSB Anbud. In September, the mechanical company Narvik Sentralverksted, that had provided maintenance for the Norwegian National Rail Administration in Narvik since 1999, accused the municipality of illegally subsidizing Ofotbanen through providing the company with subsidized rent for their workshops. Ofotbanen had just won the public tender for the contract, and the company threatened to take the municipality to court for violation of competition laws. The matter was soon resolved, without the courts being involved. In December, the government granted permission for Ofotbanen to operate charter trains throughout the entire railway network.

By November 2004, the largest owners of Ofotbanen were Cargo Nor (26.1%), the Municipality of Narvik (12.5%), Narvik Port (12.5%) and Moe Media (8.5%). In addition, employees had bought shares for more than NOK 1 million. During a general meeting on 13 December 2004, a capital placement was initiated for NOK 5.2 million. An anonymous, British consortium named GB Group bought a 36% stake for NOK 2.5 million. In 2004, the company had a revenue of NOK 20 million. The following general assembly in December 2005, GB Group made a private placement of NOK 11.7 million in Ofotbanen, increasing the consortium's ownership to 52%.

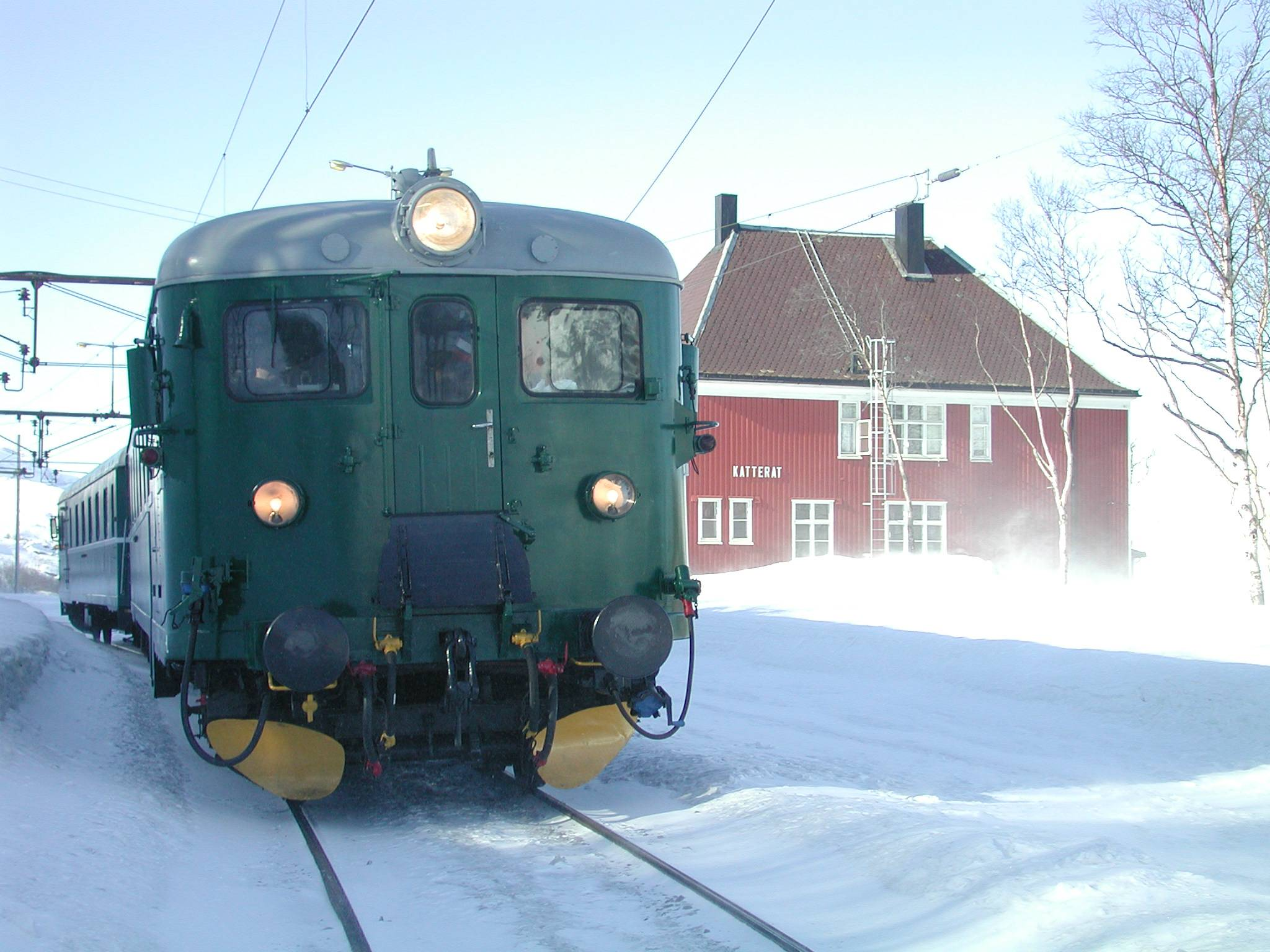
Ofotbanen has three Class 68 electric multiple units

Freight transport started in 2004, when an agreement with Norske Skog was made to transport timber along the Røros, Meråker and Nordland lines to the paper mill at Skogn. The activity was further increased in 2006, when a contract worth NOK 30 million was signed to transport 250,000 t (250,000 long tons; 280,000 short tons) of timber, including some to the other paper mill in Halden. The following year, Ofotbanen also entered the container freight market, with a train running from Narvik via Sweden to Oslo, both via the Meråker Line and via the Kongsvinger Line. The trains would continue to Drammen when necessary. Ofotbanen was also in negotiations about transporting 700 annual trains of ore for Rana Gruber, but the contract was instead awarded to CargoNet. By 2005, Ofotbanen only had a 50% utilization of their stock, but in March a contract for the rest of the year was signed securing full use of the equipment to transport timber in Southern Sweden, with two trains in continual traffic. The extraordinary traffic was needed to clean up after the Gudrun storm, and the contract gave a revenue of NOK 20 million.

=== Troubles ===
In April 2006, Ofotbanen declared that they were in severe financial difficulties. Accounts payable were giving liquidity problems, and Ofotbanen announced that they needed more capital, estimated at NOK 8 million. GB Group said they were not willing to invest more money in the railway company. Ofotbanen had then been losing money continually since the start-up in 2001; in 2004, it had a deficit of NOK 4 million of a NOK 20 million revenue. At the extraordinary general meeting on 4 September 2006, the company was sold for NOK 1 million to Rail Management, a holding company for the London-based shipping owner Mons Bolin. In November, the Norwegian Rail Inspectorate threatened to withdraw the company's safety license, since they had failed to show proper maintenance of the rolling stock.

On 31 January 2007, Autolink—Norway's largest distributor of automobiles—bought 40% of Ofotbanen, and transferred their train haulage contract to them. This made Autolink Ofotbanen's largest customer. In March, Autolink ordered an additional 70 new autoracks for NOK 175 million. In June 2007, a new report from the Rail Inspectorate showed that Ofotbanen had severe safety problems—the company was using engineers without necessary licenses, and was not performing safety analysis. Director of the inspectorate, Erik Ø. Johnsen, stated that the inspectorate did not believe that Ofotbanen was taking safety seriously. CEO of Ofotbanen, Terje Østensen, felt that the issues taken up by the inspectorate were mere formalities, and that it was difficult to make necessary documentation, stating that in his opinion, none of the procedures criticized actually influenced safety.

From the beginning of 2008, Ofotbanen lost two important contracts. All the timber contracts with Norske Skog were transferred to CargoNet and Hector Rail. At the same time, the public service obligation contract on the Ofot Line was won by SJ. This included a subsidy of NOK 3.0 million from the Norwegian Ministry of Transport and Communications for the 40 km (25 mi) section on the Norwegian side of the border. Therefore, SJ started operating trains all the way to Narvik, and Ofotbanen lost the contract of operating the trains on the Norwegian side of the border. Ofotbanen had been receiving NOK 4.5 million in subsidies from NSB for the operation from 15 June.

=== Unionsexpressen ===
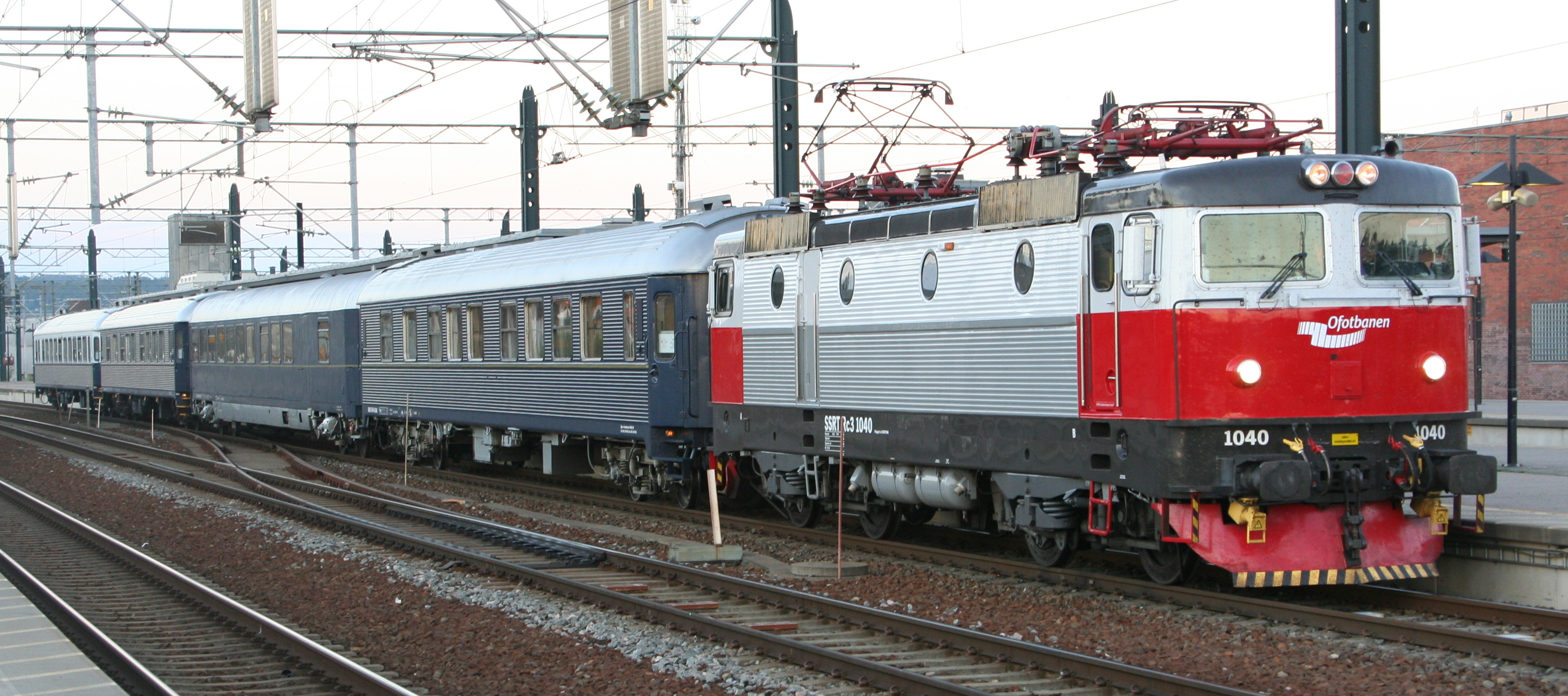
The Union Express at Lillestrøm

With the termination of NSB and SJ cooperation Linx on the Oslo–Stockholm route in January 2005, Ofotbanen announced they would be willing to take over operation of the route from the summer. However, SJ and NSB held monopolies on non-subsidized passenger trains services in their respective countries, and it would not be possible for a private company to operate the route. In May 2007, the company announced its plans for the Oslo–Stockholm train, after necessary permissions had been granted from Norwegian and Swedish authorities. By then, SJ had already reopened its route on the line. In March 2008, plans had been launched to start operations in April, but Ofotbanen had not met the requirements to get a safety licence from the inspectorate. The company rented rolling stock from SJ, including an Rc locomotives, and newly renovated cars from the 1960s. The service was a cooperation between Ofotbanen and the Swedish company Scandinavian Railway.

The necessary certificates were granted on 10 April, and the first trial run was made the following day. Ordinary service started on 25 April, though without the dining car. The initial price was NOK 422, and travel time was 5 hours 45 minutes. The trains have four cars, of which three are regular open seating, and one is a dining car. From 15 June, full service was introduced. The company stated that the service was meant to be more luxurious than with SJ, including wider seating (three instead of four abreast) and a wooden interior. The company markets the service as all first-class seating. The trains also had Wi-Fi. After the full service was introduced, the price increased to NOK 593. By July, Ofotbanen had still not found a locomotive for the second train, and was still operating only a single round service. Passenger numbers were at 35 per departure, not close to the capacity of 84, or the necessary annual 100,000 needed to make a profit.

=== Bankruptcy ===
In July 2008, Autolink canceled their contract with Ofotbanen. Two weeks later, Autolink announced that they would establish their own railway company, which they had been working with since March. They stated that the deal with Ofotbanen was discontinued because Rail Management would not allow additional private placements of capital, nor sell their shares to Autolink. From 29 July, all automotive trains stopped running, and no cars were transported for ten days. The same day, all board members in Ofotbanen representing Autolink withdrew from their positions.

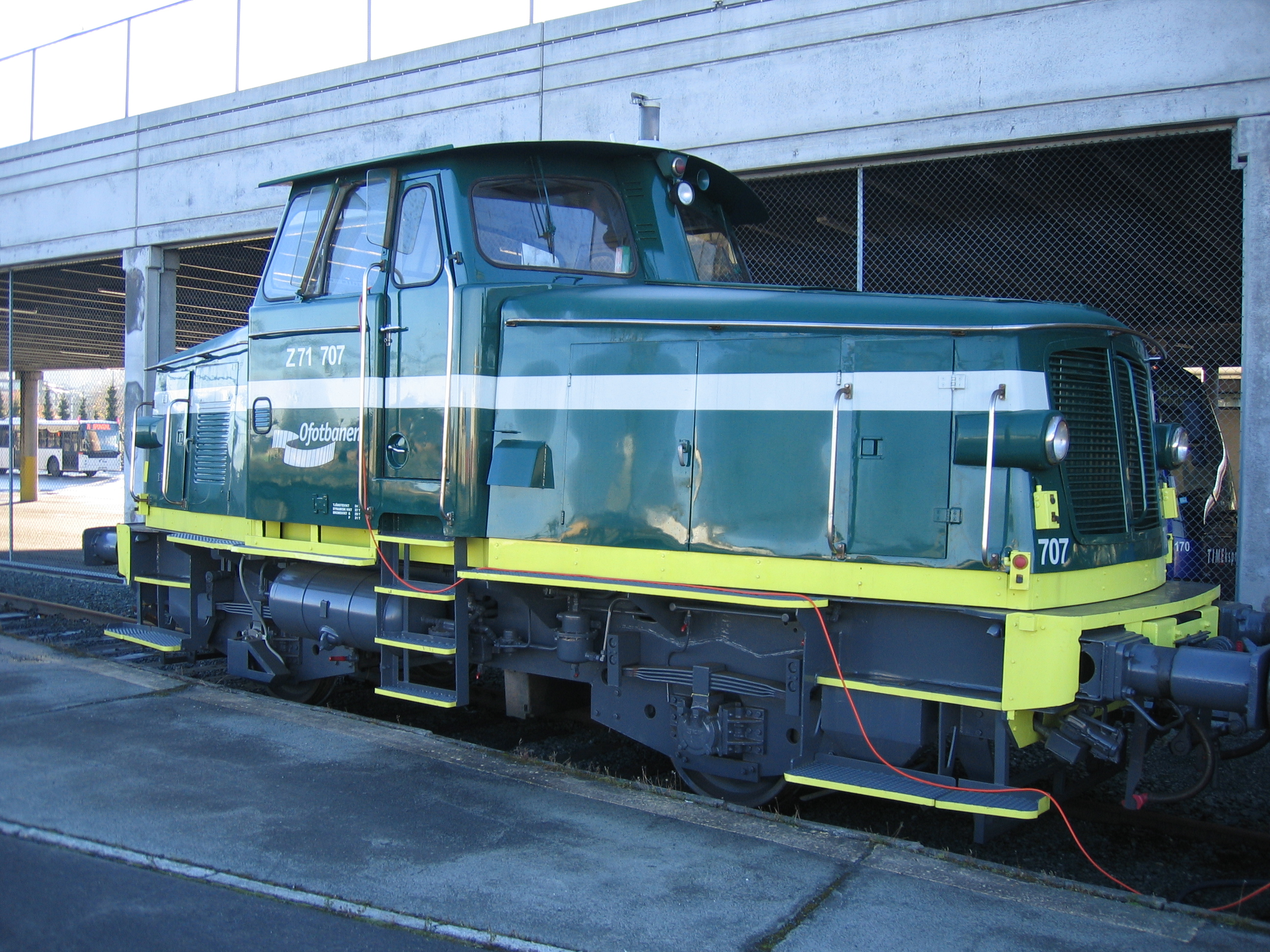
Cargolink has taken over five Z71 shunters from Ofotbanen

The matter ended in court, concerning if Autolink should be allowed to take control over four train radios that were located in locomotives owned by Autolink, but operated by Ofotbanen. In a shareholder agreement between Autolink and Rail Management, the ownership of the train radios had been transferred to Autolink, but the agreement has clauses that specified that Autolink could not start a competing railway company. Stating that Autolink had been disloyal with regard to the contract, Ofoten District Court ruled on 17 July 2008 against Autolink's demand for an interim order to transfer the possession of the radios to Autolink. The court ruled that an interim decision could not be made due to the complexity of the contracts, and that a normal lawsuit would have to be carried out to determine the matter. The parties agreed that Autolink, on 13 February 2008, had bought five shunters from Ofotbanen for NOK 12 million, of which NOK 9.5 million was paid by Autolink deleting debt. On 18 September, Autolink won the appeal in Hålogaland Court of Appeal, where Ofotbanen was convicted of stealing four radios.

Ofotbanen lost their license from the Norwegian Railway Inspectorate on 7 October 2008 at 12:00. This was because Ofotbanen had not documented necessary accounting for 2007, nor provided evidence of necessary liquidity. On 24 October, the company filed for bankruptcy.

Autolink had already founded their company Cargolink on 27 March, and received an operating and safety licence from the inspectorate on 18 September. They took control over the five shunters they owned, in addition to leasing ten Di 6 diesel locomotives. Operations started on 2 November, when all autorack trains were taken over by the new company.

=== Rebirth ===
Immediately after the bankruptcy, Rail Management established a new company, Ofotbanen Drift AS, to take over the estate in bankruptcy. They also stated that the cause of the bankruptcy was that Autolink had not let them make a private placement of NOK 10 million. The new company received an operation and safety licence from the inspectorate in January 2009, and plans to start operation again in February. On 9 April 2010, the Norwegian Railway Inspectorate withdrew Ofotbanen's operating certificate because it was not economically sound to operate. The company filed for bankruptcy in May, after the Norwegian Tax Administration could not claim NOK 700,000 in due taxes.
