= Autolink =

Norwegian distributor of automobiles

Autolink AS
- Type: Private
- Industry: Automobile distribution
- Headquarters: Paldiski, Estonia
- Area served: Northern Europe
- Website: www.autolink.ee

Autolink AS is an Estonian multimodal distributor of automobiles. With port facilities in Paldiski, Drammen, Oslo, and Malmö, Autolink prepares and redistributes to dealerships throughout the Baltic Sea region and Scandinavia, as well as distributes to other countries in Europe and Asia. The company has outsourcing agreements with many of the largest automotive importers in the area. It also owns the railway company Cargolink and the shipping company Motorships.

== Operations ==
Autolink has 200 employees and 430 million kr in revenue. Head offices are located in Paldiski South Harbour. In Sweden, Autolink has established itself in Malmö through the subsidiary Autolink Sweden AB. The Swedish division has 40 employees. The company imports 90,000 automobiles per year. The company was formerly known as Drammen Bilhavn, and is privately owned.

Transport from the factory, or from large, central ports in Europe to other ports is performed by the subsidiary Motorships using car carriers, with 150 annual calls. At the import terminal, all cars are quality controlled. The terminals in Drammen and Oslo have storage capacity for 11,000 vehicles. Autolink also offers a wide range of installation and customization services. Transport wax is removed on all cars.

Distribution is performed by autorack train from Drammen and Oslo. The subsidiary Cargolink operates ten Di 6 locomotives and more than 100 autoracks, and annually distributions 50,000 automobiles on 600 trains to terminals in Stavanger, Bergen, Åndalsnes, Trondheim, Mosjøen, Mo i Rana, Bodø and Narvik. At the terminals, Autolink redistributes the automobiles using 60 trucks to the dealerships.

=== Cargolink ===
Work with establishing the new company was initiated by Autolink in March 2008, with the company formally established on 27 March. It received an operating license from the Norwegian Railway Inspectorate on 18 September 2008. Five shunters that were operated by Ofotbanen, but owned by Autolink, were transferred to Cargolink. In addition, four Di 6 diesel locomotives have been leased from Vossloh, with options for later purchase. Operations started on 2 November.

== History ==
=== Ofotbanen ===
Traditionally, Autolink had used the Norwegian State Railways, and subsequently their subsidiary CargoNet, for operation of the autorack trains. On 31 January 2007, Autolink bought 40% of the private railway company Ofotbanen, and transferred the freight contract to them. This made Autolink Ofotbanen's largest customer. In March, Ofotbanen ordered additional 70 new autoracks for NOK 175 million.

Ofotbanen had since their establishment had economic problems. The contract with Autolink had helped, but in July 2008, Autolink cancelled their contract with Ofotbanen. Two weeks later, Autolink announced that they would establish their own railway company, which they had been working with since April. They stated that the deal with Ofotbanen was discontinued because the majority owner—Rail Management, owned by Michael Steimler—would not allow additional private placements of capital, nor sell their shares to Autolink. From 29 July all automotive trains stopped running, and no cars were transported for ten days. The same day, all board members in Ofotbanen from Autolink withdrew their positions.

The matter ended in court, regarding the matter of if Autolink should be allowed to take control over four train radios that were located in locomotives owned by Autolink, but operated by Ofotbanen. In a shareholder agreement between Autolink and Rail Management, the ownership of the train radios had been transferred to Autolink, but the agreement has clauses that specified that Autolink could not start a competing railway company. Stating that Autolink had behaved disloyal with regard to the contract, Ofoten District Court ruled on 17 July 2008 against Autolink's demand for an interim order to transfer the ownership to Autolink. The court ruled that an interim decision could not be made due to the complexity of the contracts, and that a normal lawsuit would have to be carried out to determine the matter. What was agreed upon was that Autolink on 13 February 2008 had bought five shunters from Ofotbanen for NOK 12 million, of which NOK 9.5 million was paid by Autolink deleting debt.

Ofotbanen lost their license from the Norwegian Railway Inspectorate on 7 October 2008 at 12:00. This was because Ofotbanen had not documented necessary accounts for 2007, nor provided evidence of necessary liquidity. On 24 October, the company was declared bankrupt. Rail Management subsequently established the new company Ofotbanen Drift, and stated that the cause of the bankruptcy was that Autolink had not let them make a private placement of NOK 10 million.
