= Psychologie des Kindes =

Book by German psychiatrist and neurologist Robert Gaupp

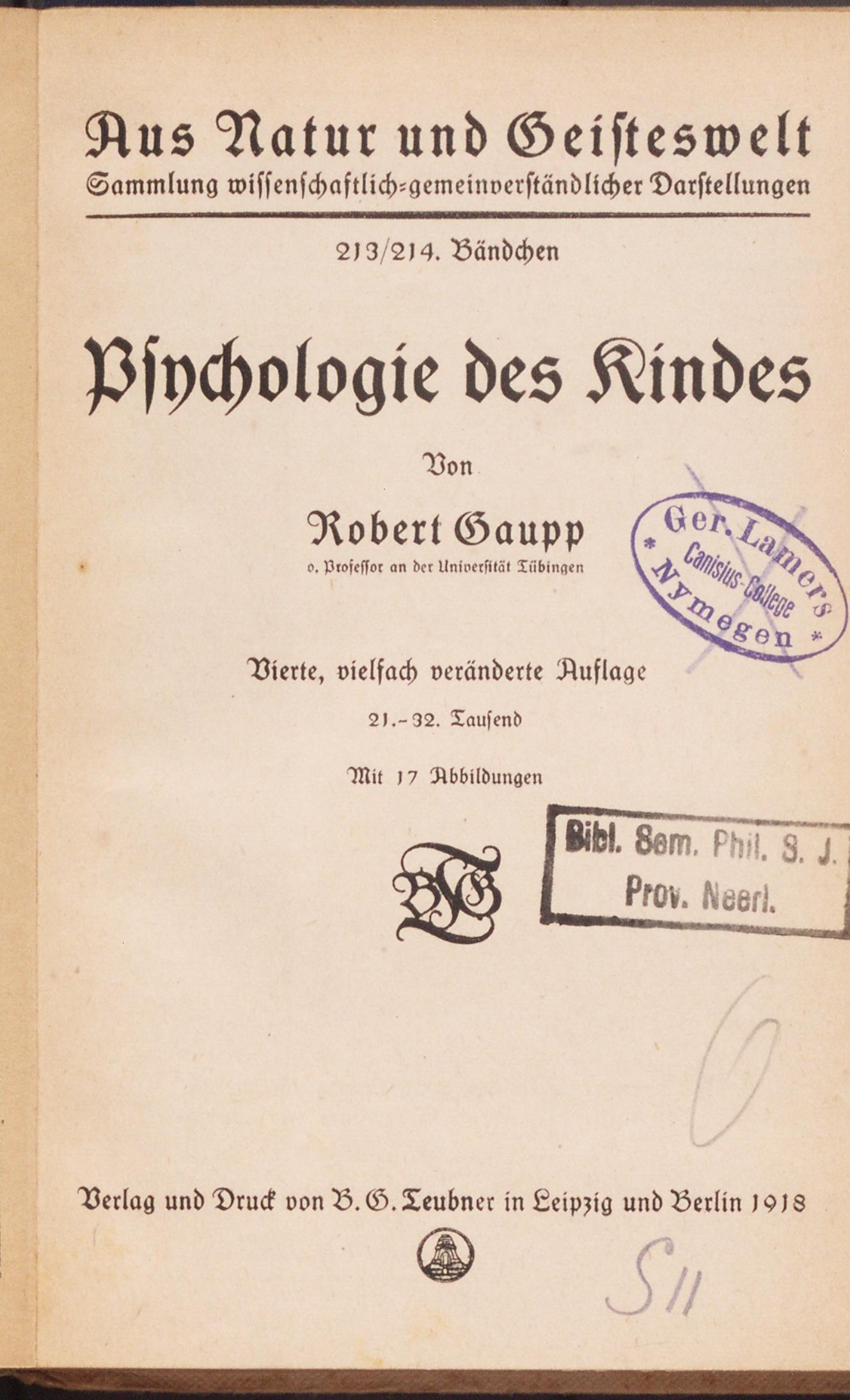
Title page

Psychologie des Kindes (in English: The Psychology of the Child) is a book written by the German psychiatrist and neurologist Robert Gaupp. It was first published in 1907 by the publishing house B.G. Teubner Leipzig Berlin. There were a total of four versions of the book, the last revised version appearing in print in 1917.

With this book, Gaupp aimed at providing an up-to-date overview of the main ideas and findings on developmental psychology of the time.

== Context ==
Robert Gaupp himself was a German psychiatrist and neurologist. In August 1904, he gave several lectures on the topic of child psychology in Heidelberg and was subsequently approached by the publishing house B.G. Teubner Leipzig Berlin asking him to publish a scientific book on this topic. The idea was to summarise the findings on child development of the time and to make the insights available to a broader audience of non-academic people. Since Gaupp himself was not a psychologist, he keeps appealing to other scientists such as Preyer and especially Stern and summarises their findings. He, however, also brings in his own ideas when it comes to neurological developments as well as his ideas on psychological "abnormal" children and the causes of those abnormalities. In that way, he combines insights from psychology, psychiatry and neurology.

To understand the creation as well as the meaningfulness of the book, it is important to know about the historical and societal developments specifically with regards to the changing view people had on children at the turn of the century.

=== Beginnings of developmental psychology ===
At the end of the 19th, beginning of the 20th century the societal view on children was changing. Before that time, the infant mortality due to diseases was so high, that parents did not emotionally invest in their children. People used to have many children knowing and accepting that many of them would not make it into adulthood. From the age of 7, children were already seen as adults and consequently were dressed like adults as well. Only once the infant and child mortality started to decrease in Europe and the United States, parents and also scientists became more interested in the children and in childhood as a developmental stage. From the end of the 19th century onwards, children were also required to go to school. During the Industrial Revolution, child labour rates had increased, but with the developing interest in children, the first laws were passed in Europe protecting children from child labour. In turn, throughout the latter half of the 19th century the fact that more researchers began to study children also let to more awareness of children's welfare. Consequently, more laws protecting children were passed and child education became mandatory in many Western countries.

The late 19th century also marks the beginning of psychology as a scientific discipline in general. One of the first scientists to study the relationship between different stimuli and mental responses was the physician Gustav Theodor Fechner. The first experimental lab for psychology was opened by Wilhelm Wundt in Leipzig in 1879, which marks the birth date of modern psychology. Both Fechner and Wundt understood the importance of empirical and methodical research. From then on, more scientist and psychologists recognised the importance of systematic observations and planned experiments in the field of psychology. This was also an important advancement for the subfield of developmental psychology as early developmental psychologists were likewise faced with the difficult task of finding appropriate methods to study children.

The first version of the book Psychologie des Kindes was written in the beginning of the 20th century. At that time that the field of child and developmental psychology was still in its infancy. One of the first documented systematic observations of children dates back to 1840 when Charles Darwin started to observe and note down the growth and development of his own children. This way of scientifically documenting the behaviour of children was in turn what inspired many European developmental psychologists. The birth of developmental psychology itself is often set to 1882. In that year, William Thierry Preyer published the first textbook on the development of children titled "the mind of the child". One of his successors is the German psychologist William Stern who contributed further to the newly formed discipline with his systematic observations on children.

=== View on mental illness ===
For most of ancient and medieval history, people suffering from mental illness were treated poorly and excluded from society, because it was often believed that they were possessed by demons. From the end of the 18th century, the societal view on those who are mentally ill was slowly changing. Now, they were placed in asylums, specifically created houses for people with psychological problems. Together with the development of the discipline of psychology in the 19th century, people become also newly interested in mental illness and its treatments. When Sigmund Freud published his ideas on psychoanalysis, he was one of the first to fully focus on treatment options and contributed to the field of psychiatry and therapy. The author of Psychologie des Kindes Robert Gaupp himself was specialised in the areas of mass murder and suicide and published several books on those topics. As a neurologist working at the psychiatric clinic in Breslau, he also looked at the possible relationships between bodily functions and mental illness, despite the fact that the field of neurology was still in its infancy.

The late 19th century also marks the time of the beginning of the eugenics movement. Based on the findings of Darwin and his publication of On the Origin of Species, the eugenics movement was interested in genetics, breeding and in improving the genetic quality of the population. Psychology played an important role in that movement, as ideas on mentally ill were spreading and test were developed to assess people's intelligence. Gaupp himself was a proponent of compulsory sterilisation of those who are mentally ill.

== Contents ==
=== Table of Contents ===
- Einleitung (Introduction)
- Erster Teil (Part I): Psychologie des kleinen Kindes (Psychology of the young child)
  - Zur Geschichte der Kinderpsychologie (About the history of developmental psychology)
  - Methoden der kinderpsychologischen Forschung (Scientific methods of developmental psychology)
  - Literatur über Kinderpsychologie (Literature on developmental psychology)
  - Einteilung der Kindheit (Classification of childhood)
  - Das seelische Leben des Säuglings (The mental life of the newborn)
  - Die Entwicklung des Kindes im ersten Lebensjahre (The development of the child during the first years of life)
  - Die Entwicklung der kindlichen Aufmerksamkeit (The development of the childlike attention)
  - Die sprachliche Entwicklung des Kindes (Language development of the child)
  - Das Gemütsleben des kleinen Kindes (The moods of the young child)
  - Die Entwicklung des kindlichen Willens (The development of the childlike will)
  - Die Entwicklung des Denkens beim Kinde (The development of thinking of the child)
  - Die kindliche Lüge (The childlike lie)
  - Die Triebe des Kindes (The drives of the child)
  - Das kindliche Spiel (The play of the child)
  - Der Unterschied der Geschlechter in der ersten Kindheit (The differentes between the two genders during childhood)
- Zweiter Teil (Part II): Psychologie des Schulkindes (Psychology of the schoolchild)
  - Allgemeines (General)
  - Die Vorstellungskraft des Kindes beim Eintritt in die Schule (The power of imagination of the child when first entering school)
  - Die Aufmerksamkeit des Schulkindes (Attention of the schoolchild)
  - Das Gedächtnis des Schulkindes (Memory functioning of the schoolchild)
  - Die geistige Leistungsfähigkeit des Schulkindes (Mental productivity of the schoolchild)
  - Die Lehre von der Ermüdung der Schulkinder (The teaching of the fatigue of schoolchildren)
  - Urteils- und Reaktionstypen. Psychisches Tempo (Types of judgement and reaction. Mental speed)
  - Die Handschrift des Kindes (The handwriting of the child)
  - Die schriftliche Ausdrucksfähigkeit des Kindes (The written articulateness of the child)
  - Das Kind und die Kunst (The child and the arts)
  - Der Abschluss der Kindheit. Die Geschlechtsreife (The end of childhood. Sexual maturity)
- Dritter Teil (Part III): Die seelisch abnormen Kinder (The mentally abnormal children)
  - Die Schwachsinnigen (Idiotic children)
  - Die moralisch Irren (Moral lunatics)
  - Die nervenkranken Kinder (Mentally disturbed children)
  - Die nervösen und entarteten Kinder (Nervous and degenerated children)
  - Die geisteskranken Kinder (Mentally ill children)
  - Anhang: Die mit Sinnesdefekten behafteten Kinder (Appendix: About children who have deficits in their senses)
  - Schluss (Final remarks)

The first version of the Psychologie des Kindes is divided into and introduction and three main parts. Gaupp starts by briefly explaining the history of developmental psychology as well as the methods that are used when observing children. He specifically stresses the difficulties one faces when trying to study children. The younger the child, the more problematic this gets. This is partly due to the fact that children do not have language yet, but also because as an adult one cannot remember the first years of life.

In the main part of the book, Gaupp first looks at different aspects of the development of the young child. Examples of topics are language development, attention, emotions, the lie of the child or the games of the child. Furthermore, he devoted a whole chapter on the differences of the two sexes at a young age.

The second part of the book takes a closer look at the further development of the child when it starts going to school. Topics include questions about mental development, memory capacities and art.

Finally, the last part of the Psychologie des Kindes is dedicated to mentally abnormal children. Gaupp distinguishes between different types of abnormalities and states his own ideas on what the causes for those illnesses may be as well as the typical symptoms.

== Reception ==
In the course of ten years, four versions of the Psychologie des Kindes were published. The book was thus brought and read by a lot of people considering the time of the first publication. In the preface of the second book, dating back to 1909, the author mentions that the first version sold so fast that after only two years a new edition had become necessary. The last version dates back to the year 1917. In the preface of the fourth version of the book, Gaupp explains that the literature on developmental psychology has expanded rapidly since the first publication of the book and he therefore had to restructure the entire book. He also mentions his concern that his book may not include every important finding of the recent years, because there were just too many .

Gaupp himself is mainly known for his contributions in the field of mass murder and paranoia but not as a developmental psychologist. Nevertheless, Psychologie des Kindes was cited by several articles and books published throughout the 20th and 21st century. This is also due to the fact that Psychologie des Kindes focused on so many different aspects of developmental psychology. For example, Gaupp had a chapter specifically devoted to how children play. Thus, he is cited by several authors who have specifically looked at elements of play in children. But also in the field of German (child) psychiatry, some articles and books refer to Psychologie des Kindes, as Gaupp after all was a psychiatrist and devotes a whole section to abnormal children in this book.

Early works in the field of developmental psychology such as Psychologie des Kindes stressed the importance of working empirically and laid the foundation for the developmental psychologists of the 20st century. Thereafter, the scientific field of developmental psychology progressed rapidly. During the early 20th century many developmental researchers were still mainly looking at children, but later on the development throughout adolescence and adulthood became more and more attention as well.

=== Gaupp´s view on mental illness and National Socialism ===
Robert Gaupp and many other leading psychiatrists of the time believed that mental illness was hereditary and promoted compulsory sterilisation thus. The aim was to prevent those who were mentally ill from reproduction. In the final part of Psychologie des Kindes where Gaupp looks in detail on mentally ill children, he also comes up with different theories on why those children are ill and what may be done about that. For example, it is hypothesied that an "entartetes" (English: degenerated) child also has abnormal parents. Thus, there must be a hereditary component to this illness. He also states his wish that in the future the psychological research methods should become better so that school doctors are able to distinguish the abnormal children from the rest. Gaupp states that it should be the goal to exclude those children from the normal school system as early as possible.

Gaupp was working and teaching at the University of Tübingen which was one of the central universities before and during the reign of the Nazi Party in Germany. From 1924 onwards a local group in Tübingen belonging to the German Society for "race hygiene" (Deutsche Gesellschaft für Rassenhygiene) were advocating sterilisation for those who are ill, which also included those who were mentally ill. One year later, Gaupp himself published another booked called Die Unfruchtbarmachung geistig und sittlich Kranker und Minderwertiger (English: Sterilisation of mentally sick and inferior). Even before the Nazis created a legal basis, the directors of the psychiatric clinic, at which Gaupp was working until 1936, were carrying out sterilisation. On July 14, 1933, the "Gesetzt zur Verhütung erbkranken Nachwuchses" (English: Law for the Prevention of Hereditarily Diseased Offspring) was enacted by Hitler, now legally justifying sterilising mentally ill people against their will. Under the Nazi regime also thousands of mentally ill children are murdered. Many of those children are exposed to medication, purposeful deprivation of food and cruel medical test before they pass away. Gaupp's writings on mental illness were used by the Nazis to support their ideology.
