= The Motorship =

Shipping magazine published in the United Kingdom

The Motorship is a shipping magazine published 11 times per year by Mercator Media, a specialist maritime publisher based in Fareham in the United Kingdom.

The magazine has an ABC audited and certified circulation. The November 2009 audited issue had an ABC certified average circulation of 7253, of which 62.2%, went to Europe, 24.2% to SouthEast Asia and 11.6% to the Americas.

== History ==
The Motor Ship was first launched in April 1920 to champion the cause of the then-novel large Diesel engine powered deep-sea ocean-going ships – i.e. motor ships - previously, marine engineering magazines had concentrated on steam power. A secondary role was to promote the British shipbuilding industry, then in a world-leading position, but coming under pressure from other nations including Germany.

It was published by Temple Press, based in Holborn, London, and grew out of the same publisher's The Motor Boat, having existed since at least 1912 as a weekly magazine, The Motor Ship and Motor Boat. After April 1920, the two publications – The Motor Ship and The Motor Boat - existed alongside each other serving their own markets; the former still exists as Motor Boat & Yachting published by IPC Media.

The Motor Ship and its sister titles became part of The International Publishing Corporation in 1963 which in turn became part of Reed International (later Reed Elsevier) and re-located to Sutton, Surrey. At the turn of the 21st century it was sold to part of Highbury House Communications and moved to nearby Cheam. Highbury House, which was experiencing difficulties sold it to Nexus Business Media, and when Nexus decided soon afterwards in 2006 to concentrate on a few key markets The Motor Ship, with sister magazine World Fishing and the Icefish exhibition, was acquired by Mercator Media in February 2007.

The new owner soon re-launched the magazine, with a minimum page count of 48 plus covers, and a new design corresponding to the change of title to The Motorship.

The magazine originally launched its online product in 2001, and this was completely relaunched in expanded and enhanced form in December 2009. A weekly e-mail newsletter is sent to registered recipients, and news headline entries are available through Twitter.

As of December 2018, its editor was Nick Edstrom, and its publisher is Andrew Webster. Industry contributors include Tom Todd (German shipbuilding and repair), Dag Pike (high speed and specialised vessels), Wendy Laursen, David Tinsley, Henrik Segercrantz, Eugene Gerden (Russia) Denzil Stuart and Jack Gaston (tugs and towage).

== Content ==
The Motorship’s target readership is technical directors, managers and superintendents in ship owning and ship technical management companies. It also has readers in shipbuilding, consultancy, ship design, and naval architecture firms as well as marine equipment suppliers, and is also widely read by marine engineer officers aboard merchant vessels. It concentrates on the ship itself, and its machinery and equipment, rather than general shipping, cargo, logistics and operational issues. It covers all types of deep-sea merchant vessel and short-sea (coastal) vessel in revenue-earning merchant service, and aims to cover new developments in the worldwide shipbuilding and ship machinery industry, with an emphasis on ship propulsion. Each issue has a combination of news, including machinery-related news, features, and opinion. The Motorship is published independently from professional associations and institutions.

== Conference ==
The Motorship Propulsion and Emissions Conference, originally known as The Marine Propulsion Conference, was first organised in 1979. The name changed after another magazine, Marine Propulsion and Auxiliary Machinery, (launched in 1985 by Argus Business Media as a competitor to The Motor Ship) took the title for its own conference. The 2012 event, held in Hamburg, Germany, was the 34th; the 2013 event will be in Copenhagen, Denmark. Under the present ownership more conferences associated with The Motorship are planned, the latest being Gas Fuelled Ships, held for the first time in October 2010 in Hamburg, and subsequently in Bergen. The 2013 conference will be held on board the gas-fuelled ferry 'Viking Grace'.
