= Regit =

UK automotive technology company

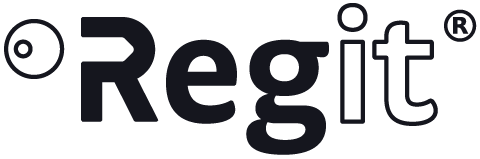
- Logo since 2022
- Type: Private company
- Industry: Automotive technology
- Founded: 2008
- Headquarters: Manchester, UK
- Area served: United Kingdom
- Key people: Chris Green, Stephen Brown, James Fawcett, John Caslin, Stuart Parkin, Steve Bell, Emma Green, Tom Gibson, Theo Young
- Website: www.regit.cars

Regit, formerly Motoring.co.uk, is an automotive technology firm that provides digital car management services for drivers based on their car's registration plate. It provides drivers with reminders such as MOT, Tax, Insurance and Recalls to keep drivers safe and legal. It also provides car news and content for its 2.5 million drivers. It is located in Greater Manchester's Northern Quarter.

Sir John Hegarty was appointed Creative Director in 2016 to lead the switch of brand to Regit from Motoring.co.uk.

== History ==
Motoring.co.uk

Screenshot of Motoring.co.uk's homepage

The company was founded in 2008 as Motoring.co.uk by Terry Hogan and Chris Green and provides various tools for motorists including free car valuations, car comparison and car reviews. As of 2015, it had two million registered users with over 850,000 monthly visits.

Initially Motoring.co.uk focused on providing classified adverts in the used car market and has since diversified significantly; providing a wide range of content, information and services for users across buying, selling and owning a car. It is known for offering a large array of free tools to both consumers and auto-enthusiasts.

In August 2014, Motoring.co.uk secured £500,000 from The Greater Manchester Loan Fund (GMLF), managed by Maven Capital Partners to accelerate the launch of its new platform, MyMotoring.co.uk.

In May 2017, it was announced that a rebrand would take place.

In February 2018, Regit launched a crowdfunding campaign to scale its user base from 1.4 to 6 million users.

== MyMotoring.co.uk ==
In September 2014 the company launched MyMotoring.co.uk, with the aim to support all motorists throughout their entire car owning life-cycle, by giving them regular updates and reminders. By April 2015, MyMotoring.co.uk had already attracted over 500,000 registered users. Meanwhile, this service was renamed into regit.cars/garage.
