= Motorships AS =

Norwegian shipping company

- Company type: Subsidiary
- Headquarters: Drammen, Norway
- Website: www.motorships.no

Motorships AS is a Norwegian shipping company that operates car carriers for its owner Autolink. The company makes 150 annual calls at Drammen, where it delivers cars from automotive manufactures throughout the world. Three quarters of all automotive imports to Norway operate through Autolink. The company has agency cooperation tasks with Wallenius Wilhelmsen Line, United European Car Carriers and NYK Car Carriers.
