= Motoring hood =

Type of headwear

A woman's motoring hood fitted with spectacles from the year 1905.

A motoring hood or driving hood was a women's fashion in the early 20th century whose purpose was to protect the wearer from dirt and dust while driving or riding in an automobile.
